= List of compositions for viola: A to B =

This article lists compositions written for the viola. The list includes works in which the viola is a featured instrument: viola solo, viola and piano, viola and orchestra, ensemble of violas, etc. Catalogue number, date of composition and publisher (for copyrighted works) are also included. Ordering is by composer surname.

This pages lists composers whose surname falls into the A to B alphabetic range. For others, see respective pages:

- List of compositions for viola: C to E
- List of compositions for viola: F to H
- List of compositions for viola: I to K
- List of compositions for viola: L to N
- List of compositions for viola: O to R
- List of compositions for viola: S
- List of compositions for viola: T to Z

== A ==
- Erkki Aaltonen (1910–1990)

Preludi ja allegro (Prelude and Allegro) for viola and piano (1983); Julkaisija Erkki Aaltone

- Walter Abendroth (1896–1973)

Concerto for viola and orchestra
Divertimento for flute and viola, Op. 5 (1928); Willy Müller Süddeutscher Musikverlag
Sonata No. 1 in G for viola and piano, Op. 21a (1956); Willy Müller Süddeutscher Musikverlag
Sonata No. 2 in C for viola and piano, Op. 21b (1957); Willy Müller Süddeutscher Musikverlag

- Hans Abrahamsen (b. 1952)

Hymne for cello or viola solo (1990); Edition Wilhelm Hansen

- Jean Absil (1893–1974)

Berceuse for cello or viola or alto saxophone and small orchestra (or piano) (1932); Gervan Édition Musicale; CeBeDeM
Concertino for viola and orchestra, Op. 122 (1964); CeBeDeM
Concerto for viola and orchestra, Op. 54 (1942); CeBeDeM
Sonatine en duo for violin and viola, Op. 112 (1962); CeBeDeM

- Joseph Achron (1886–1943)

2 Pieces for viola and piano, Op. 65 (1932); Israeli Music Publications

- Dieter Acker (1940–2006)

Arkaden II for viola and piano (1995)
Duo for viola and cello (1973); Bote & Bock; Boosey & Hawkes
Equale II for 2 violas (1987)
Musik for viola, harp and string orchestra (1992); Ries & Erler Musikverlag
Sonata for viola and harp (1987); Ries & Erler Musikverlag
Sonata for viola and piano (1985); Bote & Bock; Boosey & Hawkes
Trio for flute, viola and harp (or guitar) (1987)
Trio for clarinet, viola and piano (1992)

- Selman Ada (b. 1953)

2 Konser Prelüdü (2 Concert Preludes) for flute, viola and harp (2002); Strube Verlag

- Byron Adams (b. 1955)

Sonata for viola and piano (2010–2011); Editions Bim

- Murray Adaskin (1906–2002)

Concerto No. 1 for viola and orchestra (1991); AdLar Publications; Canadian Music Centre
Concerto No. 2 for viola and orchestra (1995); AdLar Publications; Canadian Music Centre
Duo for viola and guitar (1996); AdLar Publications; Canadian Music Centre
Duo for viola and piano (1999); AdLar Publications; Canadian Music Centre
Finki, Where Are You? for 2 violas (2000); AdLar Publications
Sonatine Baroque for solo viola (1952, 1999); AdLar Publications
Vocalise No. 1 for solo viola (1990); Canadian Music Centre
Vocalise No. 2 for solo viola (1996); Canadian Music Centre

- Thomas Adès (b. 1971)

Four Berceuses from The Exterminating Angel for clarinet, viola and piano (2021); Faber Music
Three Berceuses from The Exterminating Angel for viola and piano (2018); Faber Music

- Samuel Adler (b. 1928)

Canto XVI for viola solo (2004); Ludwig Music Publishing
Concerto for viola and orchestra (1999); Theodore Presser
Divertissement for viola and marimba (2002); Theodore Presser
Five Choral Scherzi for mixed chorus, viola and guitar (2007); Theodore Presser
Into the Radient [sic] Boundaries of Light for viola and guitar (1993); Theodore Presser
Sonata for viola and piano (1984); Theodore Presser
Song and Dance for viola and orchestra (1961); Oxford University Press
Triolet for flute, viola and harp (1989); C.F. Peters

- Bruce Adolphe (b. 1955)

Dreamsong for viola and piano (1989); American Composers Alliance
Duo for viola and piano (1980); American Composers Alliance
Hoodoo Duo for viola and double bass (1994); American Composers Alliance

- Julia Adolphe (b. 1988)

Unearth, Release, Concerto for viola and orchestra (2016)

- Milton Adolphus (1913–1988)

Bouncettino for viola and piano, Op. 78 (1944); American Composers Alliance
Improvisation for viola and piano, Op. 61 (1937); American Composers Alliance

- Ernani Aguiar (b. 1950)

Meloritmias No. 5 for viola solo (1987); Editora Novas Metas

- Miguel del Águila (b. 1957)

Concierto en Tango, Concerto for viola and orchestra (2014); Peermusic Classical
Silence for viola and piano (2016)
Submerged for flute, viola and harp (2015)

- Kalevi Aho (b. 1949)

Am Horizont for viola solo with voice (2020); Fennica Gehrman
Concerto for viola and chamber orchestra (2006); Fennica Gehrman
Lamento for 2 violas (2001); Modus Musiikki
Solo XII (In Memoriam Einojuhani Rautavaara) for viola solo (2016); Fennica Gehrman
Trio for clarinet, viola and piano (2006); Fennica Gehrman

- Joseph Ahrens (1904–1997)

Sonata for viola and organ (or positive organ) (1953); Willy Müller Süddeutscher Musikverlag

- Necil Kazım Akses (1908–1999)

Acıklı Ezgi (Canto Lamentoso): Hüzünlü Melodi (Sad Melody) for viola solo (1984)
Capriccio for viola solo (1977–1978); Devlet Konservatuvarı Yayınları
Concerto for viola and orchestra (1977); Devlet Konservatuvarı Yayınları

- Isaac Albéniz (1860–1909)

L'Automne from Les Saisons for viola and piano; original for piano; transcription by Paul-Louis Neuberth (1922); Éditions Costallat; Éditions Alphonse Leduc
Mallorca: Barcarola for viola and piano, Op. 202 (1892); original for piano; transcription by J. Amaz; Unión Musical Ediciones
Puerta de tierra: Bolero from Recuerdos de Viaje for viola and piano, Op. 71 (1887); original for piano; transcription by J. Amaz; Unión Musical Ediciones
Tango in D major from España for viola and piano, Op. 165 No. 2 (1890); original for piano; transcription by Watson Forbes (1962); Oxford University Press

- Karel Albert (1901–1987)

Werkstuk for viola and wind quintet or piano (1958); CeBeDeM

- Per Hjort Albertsen (1919–2015)

Pastorale for viola and piano (1955); original from Liten Suite for Strykeorkester (Little Suite) for string orchestra, Op. 14 (1955); Music Information Centre Norway
Sonatina for violin (or viola, or cello) and piano, Op. 50 (1985); Music Information Centre Norway

- Alexander Albrecht (1885–1958)

Čertík v rozprávke (The Villain of the Fairytale) for viola solo (1952)
Scherzo for violin and viola (1957)
Suite Concertante for viola and piano (1948); Slovenský hudobný fond
Trio for 2 violins and viola (1943); Opus Bratislava

- Johann Georg Albrechtsberger (1736–1809)

Duo in C major for viola and cello (1783)

- Mark Alburger (b. 1957)

Concerto "Felicitations" for viola and orchestra, Op. 119 (2004)
Duo Sonata No. 2 "Wasatch" for viola and percussion, Op. 31 (1986)

- Luna Alcalay (1928–2012)

Gyroskop for viola solo (1998); Edition HH; Music Information Centre Austria
un sogno à tre for flute, viola and harp (1990); Music Information Centre Austria

- Liana Alexandra (1947–2011)

Concerto for viola, flute and chamber orchestra, Op. 23 (1980); Editura Muzicală
Quasi Cadenza for violin or viola solo, Op. 27 (1983)

- Román Alís (1931–2006)

Balada de las cuatro cuerdas: pequeña pieza (Ballad on Four Strings: Little Piece) for viola and piano, Op. 116 (1977); Ópera Tres
Cuatro piezas (4 Pieces) for 2 violas, Op. 98 (1972)
Estudio (Study) for viola and piano, Op. 57 (1966)

- Charles-Valentin Alkan (1813–1888)

Sonate de Concert in E major for viola and piano, Op. 47 (1857); transcription by Casimir Ney (published 1858); original for cello and piano

- Claude Loyola Allgén (1920–1990)

Dialog (Dialogue) for violin and viola (1986); Swedish Music Information Centre
Drakdans av Béla Bartók for viola and piano (1955); Swedish Music Information Centre

- António Victorino d'Almeida (b. 1940)

Sonata for viola and piano, Op. 94 (1994); AvA Musical Editions
Rock and Roll for viola, double bass and piano, Op. 112 (1998)

- José Antônio de Almeida Prado (1943–2010)

Sertões (Backcountry) for viola solo (1978); Tonos Musikverlag
Sonata No. 1 for viola and piano (1983); Tonos Musikverlag

- Eduardo Alonso-Crespo (b. 1956)

Concerto for viola and string orchestra, Op. 17 (2002)
Double Concerto for violin, viola and string orchestra, Op. 41 (2022)

- Ruben Altunyan (1939–2021)

Concerto-Symphony (Կոնցերտ-Սիմֆոնիա; Концерт-Симфония) for violin, viola and orchestra (1966)

- William Alwyn (1905–1985)

Ballade for viola and piano (1939); Corda Music Publications
2 Folk Tunes for cello or viola and piano (or harp) (1936); Oxford University Press
Pastoral Fantasia for viola and string orchestra (1939); Corda Music Publications
Sonata Impromptu for violin and viola (1939); Corda Music Publications
Sonatina for viola and piano (1941, 1944); The William Alwyn Foundation

- Efraín Amaya (b. 1959)

Recuerdos (Memories) for viola solo (1982); Lafi Publishers

- Johan Amberg (1946–1914)

Fantaisiestücke (Fantasy Pieces) for clarinet, viola and piano, Op. 12 (1910); Wilhelm Hansen Musikforlag

- Claudio Ambrosini (b. 1948)

'Oh, mia Euridice'...a Fragment for clarinet and viola (1981)

- André Amellér (1912–1990)

L'arc-en-ciel (The Rainbow), 7 Easy Pieces for viola and piano, Op. 221 (1975); Éditions Gérard Billaudot
Hétérodoxes for solo string quartet and orchestra, Op. 181 (1970); Éditions Musicales Transatlantiques
Mon premier concert (My First Concert), 6 Easy Pieces for viola and piano, Op. 218 (1975); Éditions Combre
Petit nuage (Little Cloud) for viola and piano, Op. 308 (1983); Éditions Alphonse Leduc
Sarabande for viola solo, Op. 80 (1953)
Sonatina for viola or violin, Op. 357 (1984)
Sourire (Smile) for viola and piano, Op. 307 (1983); Éditions Alphonse Leduc
Speranza for viola or violin and piano, Op. 375 (1986); Éditions Alphonse Leduc
Trois pièces faciles (3 Easy Pieces) for viola and piano, Op. 208 (1973); Éditions Combre

- Fikret Amirov (1922–1984)

Elegy for cello (or viola) and piano (1948); Gosudarstvennoe muzykalnoe izdatelstvo (State Music Publishing House)

- Martin Amlin (b. 1953)

Encomium for viola and harp (2004); Theodore Presser
Kennel for viola and piano (2011); Theodore Presser
Sonata for viola and piano (1987); Theodore Presser
Violetta for viola and piano (2010); Theodore Presser

- Johann Andreas Amon (1763–1825).

3 Concertante Quartets for solo viola and string trio, Op. 15
Concerto No. 1 in A major for viola and orchestra, Op. 10 (1799)
Concerto No. 2 in E major for viola and orchestra
6 Duos for violin and viola, Op. 2 (1791)
Quartet for solo viola and string trio, Op. 18 No. 3 (1803)
Quintet for flute, viola and string trio, Op. 19 No. 3

- David Amram (b. 1930)

The Wind and the Rain for viola and piano (1964); based on movement II of Shakespearean Concerto; C. F. Peters

- Pierre Ancelin (1934–2001)

Lyriques, 3 Pieces for viola and piano (1984); Éditions Gérard Billaudot

- Carl-Olof Anderberg (1914–1972)

Concerto for viola and orchestra (1945); STIM; Swedish Music Information Centre

- Karl August Andersen (1903–1970)

En Spillemannstubb (Fiddler's Catch) for violin and viola (1955); Norsk Musikforlag

- Beth Anderson (b. 1950)

April Swale for viola and harpsichord (2000)
Little Trio for flute, viola and guitar (1983); American Composers Alliance
May Swale for viola solo (1997)
Nightsong for soprano, viola and piano (2005)

- Julian Anderson (b. 1967)

Prayer for viola solo (2009); Faber Music

- T. J. Anderson (b. 1928)

Variations on a Theme by Alban Berg for viola and piano (1977); American Composers Alliance
Vocalise for violin (or viola) and harp (1980); American Composers Alliance

- B. Tommy Andersson (b. 1964)

Allegro marcato in C minor for viola and double bass (1980)
Concertino for 8 violas (1982)
Concerto for viola and small orchestra (1983)
Divertimento for viola, trombone and cello (1983); Swedish Music Information Centre
Du som är... for women's chorus, solo viola and organ (1986); words by Dag Hammarsköld; Swedish Music Information Centre
Fantasia per viola sola (1979, 1987); based on Soloviolinfantasi for violin solo; Swedish Music Information Centre
Insieme for viola and percussion (1982)
Insieme II for flute and viola (1982)
Musik till Molières Don Juan (Incidental Music to Molière's Don Juan) for flute and viola (1983); Swedish Music Information Centre
Variationer över ett tema av Mozart (Variations on a Theme of Mozart) for 2 violas (1984); Swedish Music Information Centre

- Samuel Andreyev (b. 1981)

Bern Trio for oboe d'amore, viola and harp (2015)
Midnight Audition for viola solo (2013)
Moving for piccolo oboe (musette), viola and piano (2005–2006, revised 2015)

- Iosif Andriasov – Иосиф Аршакович Андриасов (1933–2000)

Meditation (Musical Sketch) in D♭ major for viola and string orchestra, Op. 30e (1981); IMMA Publishing
Musical Sketch in F major for viola and string orchestra, Op. 4a (1985, revised 1996); IMMA Publishing

- Hendrik Andriessen (1892–1981)

Sonata in F♯ minor for viola and piano (1967); Donemus
Sonatine in één deel (Sonatina in One Movement) in E♭ minor for viola and piano (1924); Broekmans & Van Poppel

- Jurriaan Andriessen (1925–1996)

Movimenti III for violin, viola, cello with wind instruments and percussion (1974); Donemus

- Louis Andriessen (1939–2021)

Tuin van Zink (Garden of Zinc) for viola and live electronics (1998)

- Paul Angerer (1927–2017)

Concerto for viola and brass sextet (3 trumpets, 2 trombones, tuba) (1950); Music Information Centre Austria
Concerto for viola and orchestra (1962, 1975); Verlag Doblinger
Concerto for viola, harpsichord and 5 winds (oboe, English horn, 2 bassoons, trumpet) (1946); Universal Edition
Concerto for viola, strings and brass (1947); Music Information Centre Austria
Duo for alto recorder and viola (1952); Music Information Centre Austria
Duo for viola and cello (1949); Verlag Doblinger
Duo for violin and viola (1951); Music Information Centre Austria
Exercitium Canonicum, 4 Canonic Pieces for 2 violas (1980); Verlag Doblinger
Musica ad impulsum et pulsum for violin, viola, cello and double bass soli, string orchestra and percussion (1955); Verlag Doblinger
Musik für Streichinstrumente VII, Trio for 2 violas and double bass (1950); Verlag Doblinger
Musik für Streichinstrumente IX for viola and string orchestra (1950); Music Information Centre Austria
Musik für Viola allein for viola solo (1948); Verlag Doblinger
Musik für Viola und Klavier for viola and piano (1945); Music Information Centre Austria
Musique pour alto et contrebasse for viola and double bass (1949); Music Information Centre Austria
Partita in E minor for viola and piano (1944); Music Information Centre Austria
Ruminatio for viola and piano (1953); Music Information Centre Austria

- Anna Amalia, Princess of Prussia (1723–1787)

Duet for violin and viola (c.1767); Ars Femina
Fugue for violin and viola (1776); Walter Wollenweber Verlag

- Anonymous

44 18th-Century Italian Viola Duets for 2 violas; Gems Music Publications

- Peter van Anrooy (1879–1954)

Romance in E minor for viola and piano (1900)

- Theodore Antoniou (1935–2018)

For Viola and Piano for viola and piano (1993); GunMar Music
Trio for flute, viola and cello, Op. 14 (1964); Edition Modern

- Jorge Antunes (b. 1942)

Mascaruncho for 2 violas (1977); Musicália, São Paulo
Microformóbiles I for viola and piano (1970); Edizioni Suvini Zerboni
Modinha para Mindinha (Tune for Mindinha) for 7 violas (1985); written for Arminda, wife of Heitor Villa-Lobos; Sistrum, Brasilia

- Georges Aperghis (b. 1945)

Crosswind for viola and saxophone quartet (1997); Éditions Durand
En un tournemain for viola solo (1987); Éditions Durand
Rasch for violin and viola (2001)
Volte-face for viola solo (1997); Éditions Durand

- Denis ApIvor (1916–2004)

Cinquefoil for flute, guitar and viola, Op. 79 (1984); British Music Information Centre
Sonatina for viola and piano, Op. 90 (1992); British Music Information Centre
String Abstract for violin, viola and cello soli with string orchestra, Op. 43 (1967); British Music Information Centre

- Edward Applebaum (1937–2020)

Concerto for viola and chamber orchestra (1967)
Foci for viola and piano (1973); J. & W. Chester; Edition Wilhelm Hansen

- Louis Applebaum (1918–2000)

Notions for violin or viola and piano (1990); Canadian Music Centre

- Atar Arad (b. 1945)

Chaconne for viola solo (2021)
6 Caprices for viola solo (2003)
12 Caprices for viola solo (2014); Friedrich Hofmeister Musikverlag
Concerto per la Viola for viola and small orchestra (2005)
Esther for violin and viola
Rondo for viola and cello
Sonata for viola solo (1992); Israel Music Institute
Tikvah for viola solo (2007)

- Chaya Arbel (1921–2007)

Intermezzo for viola and piano (1995); Israeli Music Center
Sonata for viola and piano (2002)

- Violet Archer (1913–2000)

Six Miniatures for viola and piano (1984); Canadian Music Centre
Sonata for viola, cello and piano (1986); Canadian Music Centre

- José Ardévol (1911–1981)

Sonata a tres, Sonata No. 2 for 2 flutes and viola (1943); Southern Music Publishing
Sonatina for viola and piano (1932)

- Bülent Arel (1919–1990)

Parça (Piece) for viola solo (1971); American Composers Alliance
Viyola için Müzik (Music for Viola; Musik für Viola) (1957); Impero-Verlag
Sonatina for viola and piano (1945)

- Nils-Göran Areskoug (b. 1951)

Itération – isometrique – rhythmique: Improvisation for viola and piano (1975); Swedish Music Information Centre

- Nick Ariondo

Fantasia for viola solo (2011)
Kalamatiano for viola and free-bass accordion (1986); Ricordi

- Attilio Ariosti (1666–1729)

Sonata No. 2 for viola d'amore or viola and piano (1715); original for viola da gamba and basso continuo; transcription by Louis van Waefelghem (1896)

- Rodolfo Arízaga (1926–1985)

Cantatas humanas for alto and viola, Op. 9
Ciaccona for viola solo (1969); Editorial Argentina de Música

- Marian Arkwright (1863–1922)

2 Concert Pieces for viola and piano (published 1908)
Rêveries for oboe, viola and piano
Trio for oboe, viola and piano

- Paul Arma (1905–1987)

Divertimento No. 6 for clarinet or viola and piano (1955); Henry Lemoine
Divertimento de concert No. 6 for clarinet or viola and string orchestra with xylophone (1955); Henry Lemoine
2 Improvisations for viola solo; Éditions Choudens
Sonata for viola solo; Éditions Choudens
3 Transparences for flute, oboe or violin and clarinet or viola (1961); Henry Lemoine

- Elinor Armer (b. 1939)

Taking the Waters on Oling Island for viola solo; The American Viola, J.B. Elkus & Son; MMB Music

- Craig Armstrong (b. 1959)

Seven Stations for viola, percussion and tape (1988); Scottish Music Centre

- Richard Arnest (b. 1950)

Epithalamion for viola solo (2004)
Sonata for viola and piano (2003)

- Richard Arnell (1917–2009)

Partita for unaccompanied viola, Op. 30 (1961); Hinrichsen Edition
Sinfonia Concertante for violin, viola and orchestra (1938)

- Blaž Arnič (1901–1970)

Concerto for viola and orchestra, Op. 75 (1967); Društvo Slovenskih Skladateljev

- Malcolm Arnold (1921–2006)

Concerto for viola and chamber orchestra, Op. 108 (1971); Faber Music; G. Schirmer Inc.
Duo for flute and viola, Op. 10 (1945); Faber Music; G. Schirmer Inc.
Trio for flute, viola and bassoon, Op. 6 (1942); Novello; Paterson's Publications
Sonata for viola and piano, Op. 17 (1947); Alfred Lengnick & Co.

- Ángel Arteaga (1928–1984)

Cuatro improvisaciónes (4 Improvisations) for viola and piano (1960); Editorial Alpuerto

- Eduard Artemyev (1937–2022)

Concerto in One Movement (Концерт (I часть) для альта с оркестром) for viola and orchestra (1960)

- Alexander Arutiunian (1920–2012)

"Retro" Sonata for viola and piano (1983); Zen-On Music Co.

- Boris Asafyev (1884–1949)

Sonata for viola solo (1938); Gosudarstvennoe muzykalnoe izdatelstvo (State Music Publishing House)
Variations on a Theme of Tchaikovsky (Вариации на тему Чайковского) for viola and piano

- Robert Ashley (1930–2014)

How Can I Tell the Difference? for violin or viola with electronics and tape (1974)

- Algernon Ashton (1859–1937)

Sonata in A minor for viola and piano, Op. 44 (1888); N. Simrock

- Daniel Asia (b. 1953)

Orange for viola solo (1979); Merion Music

- Peter Askim (b. 1971)

Concerto for viola and orchestra (2011)
Inner Voices for viola solo (2011)
Viola and Double Bass for viola and double bass (2009)

- Sergei Aslamazyan (1897–1978)

Melodie for viola and piano; Gosudarstvennoe muzykalnoe izdatelstvo (State Music Publishing House)

- Clarice Assad (b. 1978)

Metamorfose (Metamorphosis) for viola and piano (2017)

- Kurt Atterberg (1887–1974)

Sonata in B minor for cello (or violin, or viola, or horn) and piano, Op. 27 (1925); Musikaliska konstföreningen; AB Nordiska Musikförlaget
Suite No. 3 for violin, viola and string orchestra, Op. 19 No. 1 (1917); Eriks Musikhandel och Förlag

- Tony Aubin (1907–1981)

Passacaglia dell'addio for viola and piano (1977); Éditions Alphonse Leduc

- Lera Auerbach (b. 1973)

Dialogues on Stabat Mater after Pergolesi for violin, viola, vibraphone and string orchestra (continuo ad libitum) (2005); Hans Sikorski
Monologue for viola solo, Op. 38 (1997); Hans Sikorski

- Dorothea Austin (1921–2011)

Analogy for viola, cello and piano (1985)
Transformation for viola, piano and tape (1973)

- Elizabeth R. Austin (b. 1938)

B-A-C-Homage for viola and piano (2007); American Composers Alliance

- Larry Austin (1930–2018)

Catalogo Sonoro "Narciso" for viola and tape (1978); American Composers Alliance
Quadrants: Event/Complex 8 for viola and 4-channel tape (1973); American Composers Alliance

- Menachem Avidom (1908–1995)

Sonata for unaccompanied viola (1984); Israel Music Institute

- Tzvi Avni (b. 1927)

Phoenix (כעוף החול) for viola solo (2001); Israel Music Institute

- Gad Avrahami (b. 1952)

Dialogue for viola and piano (1998); Israeli Music Center

- Ana-Maria Avram (1961–2017)

Ananda Asur Ely II for clarinet and viola (2000)
Hyle II for 2 violas, ensemble and computer assisted sounds (2008)
Ikarus VI for viola and tape (1997)
Incantaţie (Incantatio) for viola and orchestra (2003)
Quinconce I for viola and computer assisted sounds (2002)
Quinconce II for viola and computer assisted sounds (2005)
Seven Romanian Folk Songs from Béla Bartók's Collections for viola and piano (2003), or viola and orchestra (2004)
Ten Romanian Folk Songs from Béla Bartók's Collections for viola, piano and string quartet (2010)

- David Avshalomov (b. 1946)

Torn Curtain, Suite for viola and piano (1991); Raven Music

- Jacob Avshalomov (1919–2013)

Arias for viola and chamber orchestra (2006); Howlett Press-Music
Evocations for clarinet or viola and piano (1994); Howlet Press-Music
The Most Triumphant Bird for mixed chorus, viola concertante and piano (1987); Howlet Press-Music
Poem-Fantasies for violin and viola (1994); Howlet Press-Music
Sonatina for viola and piano (1947); Howlet Press-Music

== B ==
=== Ba ===
- Vahram Babayan (born 1948)

Sonata for viola and piano, Op. 88 (1985)
Sonata for viola solo, Op. 127 (2000)

- Milton Babbitt (1916–2011)

Composition for viola and piano (1950); Associated Music Publishers Inc.
Mehr “Du” for soprano, viola and piano (1991); C. F. Peters
Play It Again, Sam for viola solo (1989); C. F. Peters
Soli e Duettini for violin and viola (1990); C. F. Peters
Triad for viola, clarinet and piano (1994); C. F. Peters

- Grażyna Bacewicz (1909–1969)

Concerto for viola and orchestra (1968); Polskie Wydawnictwo Muzyczne
Sonata for viola solo (1958); Polskie Wydawnictwo Muzyczne

- Carl Philipp Emanuel Bach (1714–1788)

Solfeggietto; transcription for viola and piano by William Primrose; Carl Fischer

- Jan Bach (born 1937)

Eisteddfod, Variations and Penillion on the Welsh folk tune "Ymadawiad y Brenin" for flute, viola and harp (1972); Highgate Press; Galaxy Music Corporation; ECS Publishing
Lullaby for soprano, 3 violas and cello (1966); words by James Agee; Meadow Music
The Viola from People of Note for tenor and viola (1993); words by Laurence McKinney

- Johann Christian Bach (1735–1782)

Concerto in C minor for viola and string orchestra (published 1947); misattributed to J. C. Bach, but actually composed by Henri Casadesus

- Johann Christoph Friedrich Bach (1732–1795).

Concerto in E♭ major for piano, viola and orchestra, BR C44

- Johann Sebastian Bach (1685–1750)

Brandenburg Concerto No. 6 in B♭ major for 2 violas, 2 violas da gamba, cello, violone and continuo, BWV 1051 (1721)
Fantasia Cromatica (Chromatic Fantasy) for solo viola, BWV 903; original for harpsichord; transcription by Zoltán Kodály; Boosey & Hawkes

- P. D. Q. Bach (1807–1742?); see also Peter Schickele

Sonata for Viola Four Hands and Harpsichord, S. 440; Theodore Presser Co. 1971

- Wilhelm Friedemann Bach (1710–1784).

3 Duos for 2 violas, F60-62
Sonata in C minor for viola and harpsichord

- Alfred Bachelet (1864–1944)

Barcarolle nocturne et Petite histoire, 2 Pièces inséparables for cello (or viola, or violin) and orchestra (1927); Éditions Durand; United Music Publishers

- Sven-Erik Bäck (1919–1994)

Elegi for viola (or alto saxophone, or clarinet) and piano (1952); Edition Wilhelm Hansen

- Johann Georg Heinrich Backofen (1768–1830?)

Concertante for harp, viola and continuo ad libitum, Op. 8

- Ernst Bacon (1898–1990)

Koschatiana for cello or viola and piano (1945); after a song by Thomas Koschat; Delkas Music; Ernst Bacon Society
Peterborough, N.H., Suite (2 versions) for viola and piano (1952); Ernst Bacon Society
Sonata for viola and piano (1987); Ernst Bacon Society

- Nicolas Bacri (born 1961)

Cantilènes, Trois Chants for violin or viola and orchestra, Op. 29b (1988–1989); Éditions Durand
Chaconne, Duo No. 3 for violin and viola, Op. 30c (1990); Éditions Durand
Concerto Tenebroso "L'hiver" for oboe (or violin), viola and string orchestra, Op. 80 No. 3 (2009); Le Chant du Monde
Croisements, Duo No. 1 for violin and viola, Op. 9 (1983–1984); Éditions Durand
Deux Duos for 2 violas, Op. 6; Éditions Durand
1. Épisodes nocturnes (1982)
2. Threnos, 2 pièces funèbres (1987–1994)
Deux Lieder for viola and piano, Op. 3 (1981); Éditions Calao, Paris
Deux Sonatines opposées for clarinet (or viola, or alto saxophone) and piano, Op. 108 (2008–2009); Éditions Alphonse Leduc
1. Sonatina lirica
2. Sonatina lapidaria
Élégie for violin (or viola, or cello) and piano, Op. 75b (2002); Peer Music Classical
Folia, Chaconne symphonique for viola or cello and string orchestra, Op. 30b (1990); Éditions Durand
Lyric Interlude (A Study in Pastoral Style) for English horn (or flute, or clarinet, or viola) and piano, Op. 110b (2008)
Notturno funèbre for viola and piano (1986); Collection Panorama: Œuvres Contemporaines, Volume 1 (1987); Éditions Gérard Billaudot
Petite musique de nuit for alto saxophone (or clarinet, or viola) and piano, Op. 111 (2008); Éditions Gérard Billaudot
Quasi Variazioni, Divertissement "In Memoriam Paul Hindemith" for cello or viola and piano, Op. 27 (1989); Éditions Durand
Quatre Intermezzi, Duo No. 2 for violin and viola, Op. 16 (1984–1990); Éditions Durand
Requiem "In Memoriam Dmitri Chostakovitch" for viola or cello and string orchestra with flute and harp, Op. 23 (1987–1988); Éditions Durand
Sérénade No. 2: Cinq Improvisations d'après Fernand Verhesen for viola solo, alto flute, harp and vibraphone (or viola and piano), Op. 10 (1983); Éditions Durand
Sonata Variata for viola solo, Op. 70 (2000–2001); Peermusic Classical
Sonata da Camera for viola and piano, Op. 67 (1977, 1997–2000); Peermusic Classical
Sonate-Méditation for violin-baritone (or violin, or viola, or cello) solo (2008); Éditions Durand
Une Prière for viola and orchestra, Op. 52 (1994–1997); Éditions Durand

- Conrad Baden (1908–1989)

Concerto for viola and orchestra, Op. 99 (1973); Music Information Centre Norway

- Henk Badings (1907–1987)

Cavatina for viola and piano (1952); Donemus
Concerto for viola and string orchestra (1965); Donemus
Concerto for violin, viola and orchestra (1965); Donemus
Double Concerto for violin, viola and orchestra (1964); Donemus
Quempas for viola and organ (1967); Donemus
Sonata for viola and piano (1951); Donemus; C.F. Peters
Sonata for violin and viola (1928); Donemus
Trio III for 2 violins and viola (1945); Donemus
Trio V for flute, violin and viola (1947); Donemus
Trio IX for flute, viola and guitar (1962); Donemus
Trio X for alto flute, viola and harp (1977); Donemus

- August Baeyens (1895–1966)

Concerto for viola and orchestra, Op. 54 (1956); Editions Metropolis; CeBeDeM

- Simon Bainbridge (1952–2021)

Birthday Fragment for 4 violas (2006); Novello & Co.
Concerto for viola and orchestra (1976); United Music Publishers
Mobile for viola, flute, 2 clarinets and harp (1991, 1994); original version for English horn and piano; Novello & Co.

- Edgar Bainton (1880–1956)

Sonata for viola and piano (1922)

- Tadeusz Baird (1928–1981)

Concerto Lugubre for viola and orchestra (1975); Polskie Wydawnictwo Muzyczne; H. Litolff's Verlag/C.F. Peters

- Vladimir Bakaleinikov (1885–1953)

Aria for viola and piano (1935); Boosey & Hawkes
Concerto for viola and orchestra (1937)
Gavotte for viola and piano (1937); Belwin
Minuetto for viola and piano (1937); Boosey & Hawkes

- Claude Baker (born 1948)

Three Phantasy Pieces for viola and percussion (2003, revised 2005); Hal Leonard

- David Baker (1931–2016)

Concert Piece for viola and orchestra (1989); MMB Music

- Michael Conway Baker (born 1937)

Counterplay for viola and string orchestra, Op. 16 (1971); Evocation Publishing
Counterplay for viola and piano, Op. 18 (1973); Evocation Publishing
Duo Concertante for violin, viola and string orchestra, Op. 39 (1976); Evocation Publishing
Duo Concertante for violin, viola and string orchestra, Op. 144 (2008); Evocation Publishing
Passacaglia for violin, viola and piano, Op. 112 (1996); Evocation Publishing
Point No Point for viola and string orchestra, Op. 33 (1975); Evocation Publishing

- Leonardo Balada (born 1933)

Concerto for viola and wind ensemble (2009–2010); Beteca Music

- Osvaldas Balakauskas (born 1937)

Corrente for flute, viola and piano (2005); Lithuanian Music Information and Publishing Centre
Do nata for cello or viola and tape (1982); Polskie Wydawnictwo Muzyczne
Duo concertante for viola and piano (2007)
Medis ir paukštė (The Tree and the Bird) for viola and piano (1976); Lithuanian Music Information and Publishing Centre
Trio concertante for flute, viola and piano (2008); Lithuanian Music Information and Publishing Centre

- Sándor Balassa (1935–2021)

Dimenziók (Dimensions; Dimensioni) for flute and viola, Op. 8 (1966); Editio Musica Budapest
Fűzérke (Little Garland) for flute, viola and harp, Op. 51 (1994)
Hárfástrio (Harp Trio), Trio for violin, viola and harp, Op. 19 (1971); Editio Musica Budapest
Üdvözlet Violának (Greetings to Viola) for viola solo, Op. 90 (2005)

- George Balint (1961–2019)

Înainte de rostire, Poem without Words for soprano, alto saxophone and viola (2008)
În faptul unei stări, Trio for oboe, viola and piano (2006)
Odată cu trecerea timpului, Trio for alto saxophone, viola and piano (2005)

- Claude Ballif (1924–2004)

Trio for flute, viola and harp, Op. 43 No. 1 (1969); Éditions Choudens
Solfeggietto for viola solo, Op. 36 No. 19 (1999); Éditions Durand

- Alain Bancquart (1934–2022)

Baroques for viola and orchestra (1973); Édition E.F.M.; United Music Publishers
Concerto for viola and orchestra (1965); Éditions Jobert
Duo for viola and harp (1985); Éditions Ricordi; United Music Publishers
Écorces I for violin and viola (published 1968); Éditions Jobert
Jeux pour lumière for violin, viola, cello and orchestra (1969); Éditions Jobert
Les Tarots d'Ulysse for soprano, tenor and baritone soloists, violin, viola and flute soli, children's chorus, percussion, synthesizers and tape (1984); Éditions Ricordi
Ma manière d'arbre II: Du lent sommeil des feuilles for viola and 10 instruments (1992); Éditions Ricordi; United Music Publishers
Pièce canonique en trio for viola and piano; Collection Panorama: Œuvres Contemporaines, Volume 1 (1987); Éditions Gérard Billaudot
Sonata for viola solo (1983); Éditions Ricordi

- Granville Bantock (1868–1946)

Sonata in F major "Colleen" for viola and piano (1919); J. & W. Chester
Sonata in B minor for viola and piano

- Seymour Barab (1921–2014)

Concertino for viola and string orchestra (1993); Seesaw Music
Concerto for viola and orchestra (1995); Seesaw Music
Duo for viola and cello (1993); Seesaw Music
Duo for viola and harp (2000); Seesaw Music
Duo for viola and orchestra; Seesaw Music
Duo [I] for viola and piano (1994); Seesaw Music
Duo II for viola and piano (1994); Seesaw Music
Duo III for viola and piano (1994); Seesaw Music
Duo for violin and viola (1994); Seesaw Music
Duo Concertante for 2 violas and woodwinds; Seesaw Music
Suite for clarinet, viola and piano (1994); Seesaw Music
Suite for viola, horn and piano (1994); Seesaw Music
Suite for flute, viola and piano (2000); Seesaw Music
Suite for viola and cello (1993); Seesaw Music
Trio for flute, viola and harp (1993); Seesaw Music

- İlhan Baran (born 1934)

Bir Bölümlü Sonatina (Sonatina in One Movement) for viola and piano (1965)

- George Barati (1913–1996)

Cantabile e Ritmico for viola and piano (1947); Peermusic
Duo I for flute and viola (1976); American Composers Alliance
Duo II for flute and viola (1977); American Composers Alliance
Spring Serenade for flute, viola and cello (1987); American Composers Alliance
Trio for flute, viola and guitar (1979?); American Composers Alliance
Trio Profundo for viola, cello and double bass (1990); American Composers Alliance

- Josef Bardanashvili – ברדנשווילי יוסף (born 1948)

Metamorphoses (מטמורפוזות) for viola and piano (1998); Israeli Music Center
Postludium (פוסטלודיום), Concerto for viola and chamber orchestra (2002); Israel Music Institute

- Vytautas Barkauskas (1931–2020)

Concerto for viola and chamber orchestra (1981); Sovetsky kompozitor; Schirmer Russian Music; Lithuanian Music Information and Publishing Centre
Duo Concertante for violin, viola and orchestra, Op. 122 (2004); Lithuanian Music Information and Publishing Centre
Duo Sonata for violin and viola (1984)
Eskizas (Sketch) for viola and piano (published 1988); Lithuanian Music Information and Publishing Centre
Toccamento No. 2 for viola solo, violin, cello and piano (1998); Lithuanian Music Information and Publishing Centre
Du monologai (Two Monologues) for viola solo, Op. 71 (1983, 2004); Lithuanian Music Information and Publishing Centre

- Michael Barkl (born 1958)

Coming Out, Fanfare for viola and double bass (1998); Australian Music Centre
Night Words for viola and piano (1977); Australian Music Centre

- Wayne Barlow (1912–1996)

Elegy for viola and piano (1967); L. Schwann
Intermezzo for viola and harp (1980)

- Milton Barnes (1931–2001)

Ballade for solo viola (1978); Canadian Music Centre
Canciones español for soprano, viola and piano (1997); Canadian Music Centre
Concerto for viola and orchestra (1977); Canadian Music Centre
Elizabethan Dances for viola and piano (1979); Canadian Music Centre
Harbord Street for flute, viola and harp (1991); Canadian Music Centre
Tango 99 for flute, viola and harp (2000); Canadian Music Centre
Classical Cat for flute, viola and harp (1999); Canadian Music Centre
Lament; Hymn Tune Pavane for viola and piano (1976); Canadian Music Centre
Lamentations of Jeremiah for viola solo (1959); Jaymar Music; Canadian Music Centre
Three Elizabethan Dances, Incidental Music for Romeo and Juliet for viola, guitar and percussion (1976); Canadian Music Centre
Vignette for Juliet, Incidental Music for Romeo and Juliet, Improvisation for viola, guitar and percussion (1976); Canadian Music Centre

- David Barnett (1907–1985)

Ballade for viola and piano, Op. 16 (1959); Oxford University Press

- Matthew Barnson (born 1979)

Nocturnes for viola, Hammond B3 organ and percussion (2002)
3 Pieces for viola solo (1997–1998)
Rounds for soprano and 2 violas (2006)
Seraph, Duo for violin and viola (2005)
4 Songs for voice and piano or viola (2004)
Tyger, Tyger for clarinet, viola and piano (2010)

- Bernard Barrell (1919–2005)

A Pageant of Pieces for viola and piano, Op. 100 (1982); Stainer & Bell
Partita for violin or viola solo, Op. 81 (1976); Barry Brunton Music Publishers
4 Party Pieces for viola and piano, Op. 114 (1987); Piper Publications
Soliloquy for cello (or violin, or viola, or clarinet) and piano, Op. 3 (1939)

- Joyce Howard Barrell (1917–1989)

Three Fours for viola and piano, Op. 45 (1986); Barry Brunton Music Publisher

- Richard Barrett (born 1959)

ecliptic for viola solo (2003); United Music Publishers
Nothing Elsewhere for viola solo (1987, revised 2005); United Music Publishers

- Odoardo Barri (1844–1920)

6 Morceaux de salon for violin or viola and piano (1890)

- Sergio Barroso (born 1946)

Concerto for viola and orchestra (1996); Canadian Music Centre
Sandunga for viola and tape (1998); Canadian Music Centre
Viola desnuda for viola solo (1995–1997); Canadian Music Centre
Viejas voces for viola and tape (1993–1994); Canadian Music Centre

- Gerald Barry (born 1952)

Concerto for viola and orchestra (2018–2019); Schott Music

- Jiří Bárta (1935–2012)

Concerto for viola, chamber string orchestra and piano (2001); Český Hudební Fond

- Lubor Bárta (1928–1972)

Concerto for viola and orchestra (1957); Český Hudební Fond

- Hans-Christian Bartel (1932–2014)

Concerto for viola and small orchestra (1963); Breitkopf und Härtel

- Pierre Bartholomée (born 1937)

Aria andante for viola, harp and piano (2010); Quindicesima Publishing
Et j'ai vu l'âme sur un fil...elle dansait for flute, viola and harp (2000); Quindicesima Publishing
Face à face for viola solo (2009); Quindicesima Publishing
Sonata for viola and piano (2003–2004); Quindicesima Publishing
Trois Pôles entrelacés for viola and harp soloists, English horn, bass clarinet, contrabassoon and 2 horns (1985); Éditions Salabert

- Béla Bartók (1881–1945)

Bagatelle for viola and piano, Op. 6 No. 2, Sz. 38 (1908); original for piano; transcription by Vadim Borisovsky
44 Duets for 2 violas, Sz. 98, BB104 (1931–1932); original for 2 violins; adaptation by William Primrose; Boosey & Hawkes
An Evening in the Village (Este a székelyekél) and Slovak Peasant's Dance (Tót legények tánca) for viola and piano (1924); transcription by Károly Váczi; Editio Musica Budapest
Concerto for viola and orchestra, Sz. 120, BB128 (1945); completed in 1949 by Tibor Serly

- Bruno Bartolozzi (1911–1980)

Andamenti for viola solo (1967); Edizioni Suvini Zerboni
Musica per Piero for 2 violas (1971); Edizioni Suvini Zerboni

- Jan Zdeněk Bartoš (1908–1981)

Concerto da camera for viola and string orchestra (1970); Bärenreiter-Verlag; Český Hudební Fond
Fantazie for viola solo (1980); Panton Praha; Český Hudební Fond
Koncert pro trio for violin, viola, cello and string orchestra (1975); Český Hudební Fond
Partita for viola solo, Op. 36 (1944); Pritomnosti; Český Hudební Fond
Sonatina for viola and piano, Op. 46 (1947); Orbis; Artia; Český Hudební Fond
Staří přátele (Old Friends), Concertante Suite for viola, double bass and 9 wind instruments (1964); Český Hudební Fond
Trio for violin, viola and harp (1961); Český Hudební Fond

- Carin Bartosch Edström (born 1965)

Happiness Is a G-String for viola solo (1996); Swedish Music Information Centre

- Leslie Bassett (1923–2016)

Sonata for viola and piano (1956); American Composers Alliance
Trio for clarinet, viola and piano (1953); American Composers Alliance

- Stanley Bate (1911–1959)

Concerto for viola and orchestra, Op. 46 (1944–1946); Edition Schott
Pastorale for viola and piano, Op. 57 (1947)

- Dennis Báthory-Kitsz (born 1949)

Binky Plays Marbles: A Bruckner Boulevand Dance for viola and double bass (1992); Frog Peak Music
Evasively Transcendental for viola solo (2007)
In het Donkere Bos (In the Dark Forest) for viola and bass clarinet (2007)
In Search of the Lightness of Horizon for viola solo (2007)
In Search of the Seven Blue Stars for viola solo (2007)

- Marion Bauer (1882–1955)

Sonata for viola and piano, Op. 22 (1932); Society for the Publication of American Music; G. Schirmer; Da Capo Press; Theodore Presser

- Ross Bauer (born 1951)

Chin Music for viola and piano (1989); C. F. Peters
Pulse for clarinet, viola and piano (1999); C. F. Peters

- Jürg Baur (1918–2010)

Concerto for viola and orchestra (1951); Breitkopf & Härtel
Polyphone Miniaturen for 4 violas (1998); Edition Dohr
Sonata for viola solo (1969); Breitkopf & Härtel

- Arnold Bax (1883–1953)

Concert Piece in C minor for viola and piano, GP 59 (1904); Corda Music Publications
Elegiac Trio for flute, viola and harp, GP 178 (1916); Chester Music
Fantasy Sonata in F♯ minor for viola and harp, GP 284 (1927); Chappell & Co.
Legend in E minor for viola and piano, GP 299 (1929); Chappell & Co.
Phantasy for viola and orchestra, GP 235 (1920); Murdoch, Murdoch
Sonata in G major for viola and piano, GP 251 (1921–1922); Chappell & Co.
Trio in One Movement in E major for violin, viola (or clarinet) and piano, Op. 4, GP 87 (1906); Charles Avison; Chester Music; Lauren Publications

- Christabel Baxendale (1886–?)

Plaintive Melody for violin or viola and piano (1951); Bosworth & Co.

- Paul Bazelaire (1886–1958)

Funérailles for viola and piano, Op. 120 (1946); Éditions Salabert
Morceau de Lecture for viola and piano; Médiathèque de Sedan

- Irwin Bazelon (1922–1995)

Concatenations for percussion quartet and viola (1976); Theodore Presser
Duo for viola and piano (1963, 1969–1970); Novello; Theodore Presser
Fairy Tale for solo viola and chamber ensemble (1989); Theodore Presser

=== Be ===
- Amy Beach (1867–1944)

Sonata for viola and piano, Op. 34 (1896); original for violin and piano; transcription by Roger Hannay (1978); Edition Peters

- Sally Beamish (born 1956)

Ariel for viola solo (2012)
Between Earth and Sea for flute, viola and harp (1997); Norsk Musikforlag
Bratchwork for 4 violas (2006)
Buzz for soprano and viola (1993)
Concerto No. 1 for viola and orchestra (1995, 1998)
Concerto No. 2 "The Seafarer" for viola and orchestra (2001); Norsk Musikforlag
Concerto No. 3 "Under the Wing of the Rock" for viola and string orchestra (2006)
Duet for Martin for viola and cello (1992)
Halbkreis for viola and piano (1982)
Little Variations for viola and piano (1986)
Pennillion for viola solo (1998)
Rhapsody on Themes from Hafez for harp, viola and string orchestra (2008)
Sonata for viola and piano (2001)
Sule Skerrie for viola and piano (1995)
That Recent Earth for viola solo (2003)

- Janet Beat (born 1937)

Circe for viola solo (1974); Bastet Productions; Furore Verlag
Equinox Rituals: Autumn for viola and piano (1996); Furore Verlag
Gedenkstück für Kaethe for clarinet and viola (2003); Furore Verlag
Piano Quintet: The Dream Magus for viola with 2 violins, cello and piano (2002); Furore Verlag

- Betty Beath (born 1932)

From a Quiet Place, 3 Pieces for viola and piano (1997); Keys Press; Wirripang; Australian Music Centre

- William Beauvais (born 1956)

Storm Dancer for soprano, viola and guitar (2003); Les Productions d'OZ

- Gustavo Becerra-Schmidt (1925–2010)

Concerto for viola and orchestra (2003)
Partita for viola solo (1961)
Rapsodia for viola solo (1985)
Sonata for viola and piano (1950)

- Conrad Beck (1901–1989)

Concerto for viola and orchestra (1949); Edition Schott
Duo for violin and viola (1934–1935); Edition Schott
Sonatina for viola and piano (1976–1977); Edition Schott

- Jeremy Beck (born 1960)

Adagio and Allegro for violin and 2 violas (1981–1982, 2001–2002)
Elegy for flute, viola and piano (1983)
Fantasy for viola and piano (1997, 1999)
Passages for viola solo (2013)
Third Delphic Hymn for viola solo (1980)

- John J. Becker (1886–1961)

Concerto for viola and orchestra (1937)

- John Beckwith (born 1927)

Peregrine for solo viola, solo percussion and chamber orchestra (1989); Canadian Music Centre

- David Bedford (1937–2011)

Jack of Shadows for viola and chamber ensemble (1973); Universal Edition
Spillihpnerak for viola solo (1972); Universal Edition

- Luke Bedford (born 1978)

Wonderful Two-Headed Nightingale for violin, viola and 15 players (2011); Universal Edition

- Norma Beecroft (born 1934)

Jeu II for flute, viola, tape and live electronics (1985); Canadian Music Centre
Troissonts for solo viola and 2 percussionists (1982); Canadian Music Centre

- Jack Beeson (1921–2010)

Sonata for viola and piano (1953); Theodore Presser

- Ludwig van Beethoven (1770–1827)

Duo "Mit zwei obligaten Augengläsern" ("With Eyeglasses Obligato") in E♭ major for viola and cello, WoO32 (1796)
Grand Duo in E♭ major for viola and piano (1796); transcription of the Septet, Op. 20, by Friedrich Hermann (1853)
Notturno in D major for viola and piano, Op. 42 (1803) after Serenade, String Trio No. 2 in D major, Op. 8 (1797)
Serenade in D major for flute, violin and viola, Op. 25 (1795–1796?)

- Karol Beffa (born 1973)

"Cortège des ombres", for clarinette, viola or cello and piano (2013); Éditions Gérard Billaudot
En Miroir for saxophone, viola and piano (2012)
Concerto for viola and string orchestra (2011)
De profundis, sur le psaume 130 du livre des psaumes for viola and mixed chorus (2011); Éditions Gérard Billaudot
Les ombres qui passent, Trio for violin, viola or cello and piano (2010); Éditions Gérard Billaudot
Café 2010, Quartet for violin, viola, cello and piano (2010); Éditions Gérard Billaudot
Manhattan for viola and piano (2009); Éditions Gérard Billaudot
Mes heures de fièvre for mezzo-soprano, viola and piano (2011); Éditions Gérard Billaudot
Paysages d'ombres for flute, viola and harp (2008); Éditions Gérard Billaudot
5 Pièces for violin or viola and piano (2008); Éditions Gérard Billaudot; United Music Publishers

- Jeanne Behrend (1911–1988)

Lamentation for viola and piano (1944); American Viola Society Publications

- Siegfried Behrend (1933–1990)

Scherzoso for viola and guitar; Wilhelm Zimmermann Musikverlag

- Sadao Bekku (1922–2012)

Concerto for viola and orchestra (1971); Zen-On Music Co.

- Louis-Noël Belaubre (1932–2017)

Quatre Bagatelles (Four Bagatelles) for violin and viola, Op. 70
Les Romances de Gai Savoir for flute, viola and harp, Op. 37
Symphonie Concertante No. 4 for violin, viola and orchestra, Op. 58
Variations sur un air anglais (Variations on an English Air) for viola and piano, Op. 63; Éditions Delatour

- Luca Belcastro (born 1964)

Mari for viola or cello solo, Op. 29 (1999)

- Alan Belkin (born 1951)

Sonata for viola and piano (2006); Canadian Music Centre

- William Henry Bell (1873–1946)

Arab Love Song for viola and piano
Cantilena for viola and piano
Rosa Mystica, Concerto for viola and orchestra (1916)
Sonata in D minor for clarinet (or viola) and piano (1926); Rosewood Publications

- Máté Bella (born 1985)

Hesperus for viola and ensemble (2017); Editio Musica Budapest

- Viktor Bely (1904–1983)

Poème (Поэма) for viola and piano (1921); Gosudarstvennoe muzykalnoe izdatelstvo (State Music Publishing House); Universal Edition

- Ofer Ben-Amots (born 1955)

Cantillations for clarinet and cello (or viola) (1997); Kallisti Music Press

- Jiří Antonín Benda (1722–1795).

Concerto in F major for viola and orchestra (c.1775); sometimes erroneously attributed to Friedrich Wilhelm Heinrich Benda

- Paul Ben-Haim (1897–1984)

Arabic Song (שיר אהבה ערבי; Arab Love Song) for viola and piano (1956); Israeli Music Publications
Chamber Music (מוסיקה קאמרית) for flute, viola and harp (1978); Israeli Music Publications
2 Landscapes (שתי תמונות נוף) for viola (or cello) and piano, Op. 27 (1939); Israeli Music Publications
3 Songs without Words (שלושה שירים ללא מילים) for viola and piano (1952); original for cello and piano; Israeli Music Publications; Leeds Music

- Arthur Benjamin (1893–1960)

Elegy, Waltz and Toccata, Sonata in E minor for viola and piano (1942); orchestrated as Concerto for Viola and Orchestra (1943); Boosey & Hawkes
From San Domingo for viola and piano (1945); transcription by William Primrose; Boosey & Hawkes
Jamaican Rumba for viola and piano (1937); transcription by William Primrose (1944); Boosey & Hawkes; Viola World Publications
2 Jamaican Street Songs for viola and piano (1944); original for 2 pianos; transcription by William Primrose
1. Mattie Rag
2. Cookie
Le Tombeau de Ravel for viola (or clarinet) and piano (1949); Boosey & Hawkes
Romantic Fantasy for violin, viola and orchestra (1936); Boosey & Hawkes

- George Benjamin (born 1960)

Viola, Viola for 2 violas (1996); Faber Music

- Ed Bennett (born 1975)

Excavation for viola and chamber ensemble (2004); Contemporary Music Centre Ireland
Strange Friction for viola and chamber ensemble (2011)

- Richard Rodney Bennett (1936–2012)

After Ariadne for viola and piano (1986); Novello & Co.
Concerto for viola and chamber orchestra (1973); Novello & Co.
3 Duets for 2 violas (teacher and pupil) (2011); Novello & Co.
Lady Caroline Lamb, Elegy for viola and orchestra (1972)
Rondel for viola solo (1996); Novello & Co.
6 Country Dances for viola and piano (2000); arranged for viola and piano by Veronica Leigh Jacobs; Novello & Co.
Sonata after Syrinx for flute, viola and harp (1985); Novello & Co.
Up Bow, Down Bow, Book 2 for viola and piano (1979); Novello & Co.

- William Sterndale Bennett (1816–1875)

Romanza for viola and piano (1872); movement III from Symphony in G minor, Op. 43

- Jørgen Bentzon (1897–1951)

Fabula for viola solo, Op. 42 (1939); Edition Wilhelm Hansen

- Niels Viggo Bentzon (1919–2000)

Duo for violin and viola, Op. 539 (1989); Edition Wilhelm Hansen
Sinfonia Concertante for violin, viola, cello, clarinet and orchestra, Op. 100
Concerto for viola and orchestra, Op. 303 (1972); Edition Wilhelm Hansen

- Esteban Benzecry (born 1970); Esteban Benzecry website

Adagio Fantastico for violin, viola and string orchestra (1993)

- Nicolai Berezowsky (1900–1953)

Concerto for viola and orchestra, Op. 28 (1941); Boosey & Hawkes
Duo for clarinet and viola, Op. 15; Sprague-Coleman

- Jean Berger (1909–2002)

4 Bagatelles for violin and viola (1983); Neil A. Kjos Music
Canticle of the Sun for mixed chorus, viola and small percussion (1987); words by Saint Francis of Assisi; J. Sheppard Music Press
3 Impromptus for violin and viola (1983); Neil A. Kjos Music
6 Rondeaux for low voice and viola (1968); words by Charles d'Orléans; J. Sheppard Music Press
Tres canciones for medium voice and piano (or viola and cello) (1968); anonymous poems from the court of Ferdinand and Isabella; J. Sheppard Music Press
Trio for flute, viola, cello (1986); J. Sheppard Music Press

- Wilhelm Georg Berger (1929–1993)

Ballata for viola and piano (1954); Editura Muzicală, Bucharest
Concerto for viola solo, Op. 94 (1990); Editura Muzicală, Bucharest
Concerto No. 1 for viola and orchestra, Op. 12 (1959); Editura Muzicală, Bucharest
Concerto No. 2 for viola and orchestra, Op. 16 (1961); Editura Muzicală, Bucharest
Concerto for violin, viola and orchestra (1978); Editura Muzicală, Bucharest
3 Sequences Miniaturales for viola solo (1966); Editura Muzicală, Bucharest
Sonata for flute, viola and cello, Op. 27 (1965); Editura Muzicală, Bucharest
Sonata for viola solo, Op. 35 (1968); Editura Muzicală, Bucharest
Sonata for viola and cello, Op. 18 (1962); Editura Muzicală, Bucharest
Sonata for viola and piano, Op. 3 (1957); Editura Muzicală, Bucharest
Sonata for violin and viola, Op. 55a (1967); Editura Muzicală, Bucharest
Sonata quasi una fantasia for viola and piano (1953); Editura Muzicală, Bucharest

- Erik Bergman (1911–2006)

Nu (Now) for viola and piano, Op. 126 (1994); Edition Fazer; Fennica Gehrman; Warner/Chappell Music Finland

- William Bergsma (1921–1994)

Fantastic Variations on a Theme from Tristan for viola and piano (1961); Galaxy Music Corporation; ECS Publishing
Night Piece and Dance Piece for viola and piano (1942)
Pastorale and Scherzo for recorder or flute and 2 violas (1945); Hargail Music Press; ECS Publishing

- Luciano Berio (1925–2003)

Alternatim for clarinet, viola and orchestra (1996–1997); Universal Edition
Chemins II for viola and 9 instruments (1967); Universal Edition
Chemins III for viola, 9 instruments and orchestra (1968); Universal Edition
Naturale for viola, percussion and recordings of Sicilian folk music (1985); Universal Edition
Sequenza VI for viola solo (1967); Universal Edition
Voci for viola and orchestra (1984); Universal Edition

- Lennox Berkeley (1903–1989)

3 Pieces for viola solo (1970s)
Sonata in D minor for viola and piano, Op. 22 (1945); Chester Music

- Michael Berkeley (born 1948)

Concerto for viola and orchestra (1994, revised 1996); Oxford University Press
Odd Man Out for viola solo (1994); Oxford University Press
Tristessa for English horn, viola and orchestra (2003); Oxford University Press
Variations on Greek Folk-Songs for viola solo (1976); Oxford University Press

- Sol Berkowitz (1922–2006)

Introduction and Scherzo (Blues and Dance) for viola and piano (1974); Theodore Presser

- Hector Berlioz (1803–1869)

Harold en Italie (Harold in Italy), Symphony for orchestra with viola obbligato, Op. 16, H. 68 (1834)

- Bart Berman (born 1938)

Duo in Mediterranean Style for violin and viola (1957)

- Derek Bermel (born 1967)

Soul Garden for viola and string quintet (2000); Faber Music; PeerMusic Classical

- Alain Bernaud (1932–2020)

Contrastes for viola and piano (1968); Éditions Rideau Rouge; United Music Publishers

- René Bernier (1905–1984)

Parabole for viola and piano (1980); CeBeDeM
Sonatine for violin and viola (1943); Edition Cranz; CeBeDeM

- Wallace Berry (1928–1991)

Canto lirico for viola and piano (1965); Carl Fischer; Canadian Music Centre

- Marc Berthomieu (1906–1991)

Florilège musical No. 3 for viola solo; Éditiopns Alphonse Leduc; United Music Publishers

- Moisès Bertran (born 1967)

Secretos Compartidos, Suite in 5 movements for violin and viola (2012)
Sonatina líquida for flute, viola and harp (2006); Clivis Publicacions

- Marco Betta (born 1964)

In ombra d'amore, Ballata for viola solo (1988); Ricordi
Ultimo canto: In memoria di Francesco Pennisi for viola solo (2001); Ricordi

- Bruno Bettinelli (1913–2004)

Due Movimenti (2 Movements) for viola and piano (1977); G. Zanibon

- Frank Michael Beyer (1928–2008)

Concerto "Notte di pasqua" for viola and orchestra (2003–2004, 2006); Bote & Bock
Melos I for viola solo (1983); Bote & Bock
Melos II for viola solo (1990); Bote & Bock
Mysteriensonate for orchestra with viola solo (1986); Bote & Bock
Sonata for viola and organ (1960); Bärenreiter Verlag
Trio for oboe, viola and harp (1980); Bote & Bock

=== Bi ===
- Günter Bialas (1907–1995)

Fünf Duette (5 Duets) for viola and cello (1988); Bärenreiter Verlag
Trauermusik (Funeral Music) for viola and orchestra (1994); Bärenreiter Verlag

- Valentin Bibik (1940–2003)

Concerto No. 1 for viola and chamber orchestra, Op. 53 (1984); Muzychna Ukraïna
Concerto No. 2 for viola and orchestra, Op. 104 (1994)
Concerto-Symphony (Концерт-Симфонія) for violin, viola and chamber orchestra, Op. 61 (1986)
Elegiac Music (Элегічна музика) for viola and piano soli and orchestra, Op. 77 (1990)
Out of the Calm... (Из тишины...) for violin, viola and cello, Op. 140 (2000)
2 Pieces (2 Пьесы) for viola and piano (1962)
Recitative (Речитатив) for viola solo (1998)
Sonata No. 1 for viola solo, Op. 31 (1977)
Sonata No. 2 for viola solo, Op. 136 (1999)
Sonata No. 1 for viola and piano, Op. 72 (1988)
Sonata No. 2 for viola and piano, Op. 137 (2000)
Sounds and Harmonies for viola and piano, Op. 143 (2001)
Triptych (Триптих) for viola and string orchestra with piano, Op. 35 (1978)

- Helmut Bieler (1940–2019)

Duo for viola and cello (1989, 1990–1991); original for clarinet and cello; Arends Musikverlag
Konzentration und Ausbrüche, Concerto for viola and orchestra (1995); Arends Musikverlag

- Eugène Bigot (1888–1965)

Malinconia for violin or viola
Thème et variations for viola and piano (1959); Éditions Durand

- Jerry Bilik (born 1933)

3 Movements for viola and piano (2007)

- Gonchigiin Birvaa (1916–2006)

Lyric Song (Лирическая песня) for viola and piano (published 1969); Sovetsky Kompozitor

- Chester Biscardi (born 1948)

The Viola Had Suddenly Become a Voice for viola and piano (2005); Biscardi Music Press

- Keith Bissell (1912–1992)

Theme, Variation, and Epilogue for soprano, mixed chorus, solo viola and string orchestra (1970); Canadian Music Centre

- Georges Bizet (1838–1875)

Adagietto from "L'Arlésienne" (1872); transcription for viola and piano by William Primrose

=== Bj ===
- Jens Bjerre (1903–1986)

Purgatorio for viola solo (1964); Edition Samfundet

=== Bl ===
- Boris Blacher (1903–1975)

4 Bagatelles for viola and piano
Concerto for viola and orchestra, Op. 48 (1954); Bote & Bock; Boosey & Hawkes

- Easley Blackwood (born 1933)

Sonata No. 1 for viola and piano, Op. 1 (1953); Elkan-Vogel
Sonata No. 2 for viola and piano, Op. 43 (2001)

- Benjamin Blake (1751–1827).

6 Duets for violin and viola, Op. 1 (1780)
Second Set of 6 Duets for violin and viola, Op. 2 (1781)
Third Set of 6 Duets for violin and viola, Op. 3 (1785)
3 Solos for viola with cello accompaniment, Op. 9 (c.1825)

- Howard Blake (born 1938)

Archangel's Lullaby, Suite for viola and piano, Op. 568 (2006); Highbridge Music
Aria for viola and piano, Op. 504 (1998); Highbridge Music
Benedictus, Dramatic Oratorio for tenor, speaker, chorus, solo viola and orchestra, Op. 282 (1980); Highbridge Music
Paean for viola solo, Op. 405 (1990); Highbridge Music
Pennillion, Theme and Variations for viola and piano, Op. 570 (2006); original work for violin and harp; Highbridge Music
Prelude from Benedictus for viola solo, Op. 402 (1980, 1989); Highbridge Music

- Adolphe Blanc (1828–1885)

Romance No. 2 for viola and piano, Op. 10 (1855)

- Allan Blank (1925–2013)

Duo for violin and viola (1972); American Composers Alliance
Five from Seven (En Petite Suite) for viola solo (1985, 2002); American Composers Alliance
Music for solo viola (2005); American Composers Alliance
A Set of Opposites for viola and piano (2000); American Composers Alliance
A Song of Ascents for solo viola (1968–1969); Okra Music; Seesaw Music
10 Studies for viola solo (2013); American Composers Alliance
Two Parables by Franz Kafka for voice, violin and viola (1964); American Composers Alliance
Unfoldings for clarinet, viola and cello (2006); American Composers Alliance
Variations for clarinet and viola (1959–1960); Okra Music

- Frédéric Blasius (1758–1829)

Duet for violin and viola (1784?)
6 Sonatas for clarinet with viola or bass accompaniment, Op. 55 (1805)

- Herbert Blendinger (1936–2020)

Concerto for viola and orchestra, Op. 38 (1982); Orlando-Musikverlag
Concerto for viola and string orchestra, Op. 16 No. 1 (1962); Orlando-Musikverlag
Dialog for viola and percussion, Op. 20 (1968); Orlando-Musikverlag
Introduktion und Chaconne for viola and organ, Op. 21; Orlando-Musikverlag
Partita for viola solo, Op. 25 (1974); Orlando-Musikverlag
Partita for viola and cello, Op. 27 (1972); Orlando-Musikverlag
Sonata for viola and harpsichord, Op. 13 (1959); Verlag Doblinger
Sonata for viola and piano, Op. 12 (1958); Verlag Doblinger
Sonatina for viola and piano (or guitar), Op. 2 No. 1 (1954)
Suite for flute and viola, Op. 7 (1955)
Suite for viola solo, Op. 40 (1982); Verlag Doblinger
Tre Impressioni (3 Impressions) for flute (bass flute), viola and harp, Op. 26 (1976); Orlando-Musikverlag

- Marc Bleuse (born 1937)

Alternative for viola and piano (1974); Éditions Heugel
Bairro Alto (Quartier Haut) for viola solo (1995); Éditions Gérard Billaudot
El Contador for viola solo (1981); Éditions Gérard Billaudot

- William Blezard (1921–2003)

Duetto for viola and cello soli with string orchestra (1951); Thames Publishing

- Arthur Bliss (1891–1975)

Intermezzo in E♭ major for viola and piano (1915); transcription by Watson Forbes from Piano Quartet in A major, F. 23; Oxford University Press
Sonata for viola and piano, F. 91 (1933); Oxford University Press
Two Nursery Rhymes for voice, clarinet (or viola) and piano, F. 165 (1920); Chester Music

- Ernest Bloch (1880–1959)

Concertino for flute, viola and string orchestra (or piano), B. 80 (1948, 1950); G. Schirmer
Meditation and Processional for viola and piano, B. 82 (1951); G. Schirmer
Suite for viola and piano or orchestra, B. 41 (1919–1920); G. Schirmer
Suite for viola solo, B. 101 (1958); Broude Brothers
Suite Hébraïque for viola and piano or orchestra, B. 83 (1951); G. Schirmer

- Karl-Birger Blomdahl (1916–1968)

Concerto for viola and orchestra (1941); STIM; Swedish Music Information Centre

- Joseph von Blumenthal (1782–1850)

Grand Caprice in F major for viola solo, Op. 79 (1838)
3 Grand duos concertantes (C major, D major, F major) for violin and viola, Op. 81 (1839)

- Theodor Blumer (1881–1964)

Sonata for viola and piano, Op. 17

- Marcus Blunt (1947–2022)

Sonata for viola and piano (1999, revised 2004); Modus Music

- Carey Blyton (1932–2002)

Elegy for viola and piano, Op. 12a (1952, revised 1960); Modus Music

=== Bo ===
- Leonid Bobylev (b. 1949)

Concerto for viola and string orchestra (1970)
Viennese Musical Box (Венская шкатулка), Concerto Grosso No. 3 for violin, viola, piano and string orchestra (2007); Editorial Periferia Música

- Luigi Boccherini (1743–1805)

Sonata in C major for viola with cello accompaniment, G. 17; Gems Music Publications
Sonata in C minor for viola with cello accompaniment, G. 18; Gems Music Publications

- Ruth Bodenstein-Hoyme (1924–2006)

Fünf Miniaturen (5 Miniatures) for violin and viola (1963); Friedrich Hofmeister Musikverlag

- Sylvie Bodorová (b. 1954)

Gila, Rome! Meditations for viola solo (1980); Panton Praha
Plankty (Passion Plays), Music for viola and orchestra (1982, revised 2013); Panton Praha
Silberwolke, Concerto for violin, viola and string orchestra (2005); ArcoDiva

- Jack Body (1944–2015)

Aeolian Harp for viola solo (1979, 1999); original version for violin solo; Waiteata Music Press
After Bach for 4 solo violas and 8-part massed violas; also for gamelan, 4 solo violas and massed violas (2001); Commissioned for the 29th International Viola Congress in Wellington, New Zealand; SOUNZ, Center for New Zealand Music
Three Love Songs for tenor, viola and cello (1968); SOUNZ, Center for New Zealand Music

- August de Boeck (1865–1937)

Deux esquisses (2 Sketches) for viola (or violin) and piano; Schott Frères, Bruxelles
Fantasia in G minor for viola and piano (1916); Schott Frères, Bruxelles
Feuillet d'album (Album Leaf) for viola and piano (c.1892); Schott Frères, Bruxelles

- Konrad Boehmer (1941–2014)

Nuba for flute, viola and harp (1998); Tonos

- Philippe Boesmans (1936–2022)

Surfing for viola and orchestra (1990); Éditions Jobert

- Georges Bœuf (1937–2020)

Noctua, Song for voice and viola, Op. 89 (2004); Symétrie
Ombres (Shadows) for viola and piano, Op. 94 (2007); Éditions Questions de tempéraments
Sonata for viola solo, Op. 79 (2002); Éditions Questions de tempéraments
Territoire des ombres for viola solo, ensemble, and real-time processing and spatialization, Op. 96 (2008)
Trio for viola, bass clarinet and piano, Op. 78 (2002)

- Emil Bohnke (1888–1928)

Sonata for viola solo, Op. 13 No. 2 (1921); N. Simrock

- Rob du Bois (1934–2013)

Drei traurige Tänze (Three Sad Dances) for alto voice and viola (1954); Donemus
Sonata for viola solo (1981); Donemus
Three Sad Dances for 2 violas (1954); Donemus
Ut Supra for viola and piano (1973); Donemus
Vladimir's Hyde-Away for viola and piano

- René de Boisdeffre (1838–1906)

Berceuse for viola and piano, Op. 34; Éditions Max Eschig
Mélodie in A major for viola and piano, Op. 6
Rêverie in D major for viola (or viola d'amore, or violin, or cello) and string orchestra with harp or piano, Op. 55 (1890?); J. Hamelle
Trois pièces (3 Pieces) for clarinet or viola and piano, Op. 40 (1873)

- Philippe Boivin (b. 1954)

Cadence for viola solo (1988); Éditions Salabert
Concerto for viola and chamber orchestra (1987); Éditions Salabert
Deux Esquisses (Two Sketches) for violin or viola (1992); Editions du Visage

- William Bolcom (b. 1938)

Fairytales from the Brothers Grimm for viola, cello and double bass (1987–1988); E.B. Marks Music; Theodore Presser
Fantasia Concertante for viola, cello and orchestra (1985); E.B. Marks Music; Theodore Presser
Let Evening Come for soprano, viola and piano (1994); poems by Maya Angelou, Emily Dickinson, Jane Kenyon; E.B. Marks Music; Hal Leonard
Session II for violin and viola (1966); Merion Music; Theodore Presser

- Victoria Bond (b. 1945)

Conversation Piece for viola and vibraphone (1975); Seesaw Music; Subito Music
Duet for flute and viola (1969); Seesaw Music; Subito Music
Insects for solo electric viola (1996); Protone Music
Jasmine Flower (茉莉花; Moli Hua) for viola solo (1999); Protone Music
Mirror, Mirror for soprano, flute and viola (1969); Seesaw Music; Subito Music
Seduction and Sanctification, Triple Concerto for flute, viola, harp and orchestra (2007); Protone Music
Woven for violin and viola (2005); also for 2 flutes or 2 violins; Protone Music

- Jacques Bondon (1927–2008)

Le Soleil multicolore for flute, viola and harp (1970); Éditions Max Eschig

- Joseph-Ermend Bonnal (1880–1944)

Petit poème (Little Poem) for violin, viola and piano, Op. 29 (1911)

- Adriaan Bonsel (1918–2011)

Elegie for viola solo (1961); Donemus

- Nimrod Borenstein (b. 1969)

Quasi una cadenza for viola solo, Op. 26b (2020)
Souvenirs for viola and piano, Op. 49 (2019)

- Luigi Borghi (c. 1745 – c. 1806)

6 Duetti for violin and cello or viola, Op. 5 (1786); also published as Op. 6

- Vadim Borisovsky (1900–1972)

Concert Etude (Концертный этюд) in A major for viola solo (published 1981); Pieces for Viola Solo, Volume 2 (Пьесы для альта соло, Выпуск 2), Sovetsky Kompozitor
Vulcan: Sicilian Tarantella (Сицилийская тарантелла “Вулкан”) for viola and piano (1962); Etudes and Virtuoso Pieces (Этюды и виртуозные пьесы), Muzgiz

- Pavel Bořkovec (1894–1972)

Sonata for viola solo, Op. 12 (1931); Hudební Matice Umělecké Besedy

- Alexander Borodin (1833–1887)

Nocturne from the String Quartet No. 2 (1881); transcription for viola and piano by William Primrose

- Teresa Borràs i Fornell (1923–2010)

Concerto for viola and orchestra, Op. 106 (1992)

- Siegfried Borris (1906–1987)

Canzona for viola and organ (or harpsichord), Op. 110; Sirius Verlag
Kleine Suite (Little Suite) for viola and piano; Sirius Verlag; Heinrichshofen's Verlag
Partita for viola and cello (or 2 cellos), Op. 4 (1928); Sirius Verlag; Heinrichshofen's Verlag
Sonata in F for viola and piano, Op. 51 (published 1950); Sirius Verlag; Heinrichshofen's Verlag

- Edith Borroff (1925–2019)

Five Pieces for viola and piano (1989); American Composers Alliance
Trio for viola, horn and piano (1999); American Composers Alliance
Voices in Exile: Three Canons for flute and viola (1962); American Composers Alliance

- John Borstlap (b. 1950)

Night Music for viola and piano (1993); Donemus

- Daniel Börtz (b. 1943)

Dialogo 2 for 2 violas (1978); Carl Gehrmans Musikförlag

- Axel Borup-Jørgensen (1924–2012)

Autumn Leaves Nr. 5 for viola and marimba, Op. 167 No. 5 (2003); SNYK
Duo for violin and viola, Op. 12 (1951); Edition A. Borup-Jørgensen; SNYK
Herbsttag, Paraphrase for viola solo (1996–1999); SNYK
Mobiler efter Alexander Calder for viola, marimba and piano, Op. 38 (1961); Edition Samfundet
Musik for slagtøj og bratsch (Music for Percussion and Viola), Op. 18 (1955–1956); Edition Samfundet
O Bäume Lebens for mezzo-soprano and viola, Op. 81 (1977); Edition Samfundet
Partita for viola solo, Op. 15 (1953–1954); Edition A. Borup-Jørgensen; SNYK
Rhapsodie for viola and piano, Op. 114 (1984–1985); version II (1994–1995); version III (1994–1996); Edition A. Borup-Jørgensen; SNYK
Sine Nomine "Lerchenborg-variation" for viola solo, Op. 139 No. 3 (1990); Edition A. Borup-Jørgensen; SNYK
Sonata for viola and piano, Op. 14 (1952–1953); Edition A. Borup-Jørgensen; SNYK
Sonata breve for viola and piano, Op. 33 (1959–1960); Edition A. Borup-Jørgensen; SNYK
Ur Baul sånger for soprano, flute and viola, Op. 5 (1949); Edition A. Borup-Jørgensen; SNYK

- Hans-Jürgen von Bose (b. 1953)

... vom Wege abkommen for viola solo (1981–1982); Ars Viva Verlag

- Jean-Yves Bosseur (b. 1947)

Alto molto for viola solo (1975, revised 1992); Tonos Musikverlags

- Marco Enrico Bossi (1861–1925)

Bénédiction nuptiale from Feuillets d'album for viola and piano (or organ), Op. 111 No. 1 (1897)
Romance in A♭ major for viola (or cello) and piano, Op. 89 (1894); Breitkopf & Härtel

- Will Gay Bottje (1925–2018)

Fantasy Sonata (Viola Sonata No. 1) for viola and piano (1959); American Composers Alliance
Mixed Bag for viola and piano; American Composers Alliance
Rhapsodic Variations for solo viola, piano and string orchestra (1962); American Composers Alliance
Sonata for violin and viola (2001); American Composers Alliance

- Linda Bouchard (b. 1957)

4LN for viola, percussion and electronics (2008)
Booming Sands, Concerto for viola and orchestra (1999); Canadian Music Centre
Bref for alto flute and viola (2014); Canadian Music Centre
Circus Faces for flute, viola and cello (1983); Canadian Music Centre
Possible Nudity for solo viola, cello, string bass, harp and percussion (1987); also for viola, cello and piano (1988); Canadian Music Centre
Pourtinade for viola and percussion (1983); Canadian Music Centre
Frisson, La Vie, Duo Concertante for flute, viola and string orchestra (1992); Canadian Music Centre

- Magdeleine Boucherit Le Faure (1879–1960)

Légende in G♭ major for violin and viola (1933); Éditions Salabert

- Derek Bourgeois (1941–2017)

Caprice for viola and piano, Op. 119a (1990); original version for alto saxophone and piano; Brass Wind Publications
Fantasy Duo for viola and double bass, Op. 88 (1983)
Fantasy Pieces for viola solo, Op. 133b (1993); original version for violin solo; Brass Wind Publications

- Jean-Maurice Bourges (1812–1881)

Sonata for viola and piano (c.1880)

- Roger Bourland (b. 1952)

A Slash of Blue for mezzo-soprano, viola and harp (1984); ECS Publishing; Yelton Rhodes Music
Three Arias for viola or cello and piano (1989); Yelton Rhodes Music
Portable Concerto for viola and electronics/tape (1989); ECS Publishing; Yelton Rhodes Music

- York Bowen (1884–1961)

Allegro de Concert in D minor for viola and piano, Op. 21 No. 2 (1906); original for cello and piano; Josef Weinberger Music Publishing
Concerto in C minor for viola and orchestra, Op. 25 (1906–1907); Josef Weinberger Music Publishing
Fantasia in F major for viola and organ (1903); Josef Weinberger Music Publishing
Fantasia ("Fantasie Quartet") in E minor for 4 violas, Op. 41 No. 1 (1907); Rarities for Strings Publications
Melody for the C-String in F major for viola and piano, Op. 51 No. 2 (1918); Josef Weinberger Music Publishing
Melody on the G-String in G♭ major for viola and piano, Op. 47 (1917); Josef Weinberger Music Publishing
Phantasy in F major for viola and piano, Op. 54 (1918); Josef Weinberger Music Publishing
Poem in G♭ major for viola, harp and organ, Op. 27 (1912); Josef Weinberger Music Publishing
Rhapsody in G minor for viola and piano, Op. 149 (1955); Josef Weinberger Music Publishing
Romance in A major for viola and piano, Op. 21 No. 1 (1908); original for cello and piano; Josef Weinberger Music Publishing
Romance in D♭ major for viola and piano (1900, 1904); original for violin and piano; Comus Edition
Sonata No. 1 in C minor for viola and piano, Op. 18 (1905); Edition Schott
Sonata No. 2 in F major for viola and piano, Op. 22 (1906); Edition Schott

- Anne Boyd (b. 1946)

Esgid mair for viola and percussion (2003); University of York Music Press; Australian Music Centre
Miaren mair for oboe d'amore, viola and harp (2004); University of York Music Press

- Rory Boyle (b. 1951)

4 Dance Preludes for viola and piano (1991); Scottish Music Centre
3 Islay Sketches for violin and viola (2006); Scottish Music Centre
Such Sweet Sorrow for viola solo (2009); Scottish Music Centre

- Eugène Bozza (1905–1991)

Concertino for viola and orchestra (1932); Éditions Paul Ricard
Concerto for violin, viola and cello soli, winds, harp and double bass (1955); Éditions Alphonse Leduc
Improvisation Burlesque for viola and piano (1968); Éditions Alphonse Leduc
Parthie for viola solo (1967); Éditions Alphonse Leduc
Sonatine for viola and cello (1976); Éditions Alphonse Leduc

- Philip Bračanin (b. 1942)

Concerto for viola and orchestra (1990); Australian Music Centre

- Merrill Bradshaw (1929–2000)

Homages, Concerto for viola and small orchestra (1979)
Love and Death: Four Elizabethan Lyrics for soprano, viola and string orchestra (1984)
Suite for viola solo (1956)
Three Sketches for viola solo (1963)

- Timothy Brady (b. 1956)

Concerto for viola and orchestra (2010–2012); Canadian Music Centre
Dark Matter (Primal Pulse) for viola solo and chamber ensemble (1998); Canadian Music Centre
Frame 4: Still for electric guitar and viola (2007); Canadian Music Centre
Short Conversation(s) with Jennifer T. for viola and marimba (2018) or for viola and piano (2020)
Struck Twice by Lightning for viola and sampler (or tape) (1999); Canadian Music Centre
Suddenly for viola and piano (2021)
Three or Four Days after the Death of Kurt Cobain for viola and piano (1994, 1999); Canadian Music Centre

- Edvard Fliflet Bræin (1924–1976)

Serenade for viola and orchestra (1947); Edition Harald Lyche

- Johannes Brahms (1833–1897)

Sonata No. 1 in F minor for viola and piano, Op. 120 No. 1 (1894)
Sonata No. 2 in E♭ major for viola and piano, Op. 120 No. 2 (1894)
2 Gesänge (2 Songs) for alto, viola and piano, Op. 91 (1884)
2 ungarische Tänze (2 Hungarian Dances) – No. 3 in F major and No. 1 in D minor for viola and piano (1869); transcription by Watson Forbes; Hinrichsen Edition; Peters Edition
Waltz in A major for viola and piano, Op. 39 No. 15 (1865); transcription by Vadim Borisovsky; Album of 6 Pieces, International Music Company
Wie Melodien zieht es mir (Soft Strains of Music Drifting) for viola and piano, Op. 105 No. 1 (1886); original for voice and piano; transcription by William Primrose; Carl Fischer
Wir wandelten (We Wandered) for viola and piano, Op. 96 No. 2 (1884); original for voice and piano; transcription by Lionel Tertis; Boosey & Hawkes

- Thüring Bräm (b. 1944)

"... Dass es nichts Neues gibt unter der Sonne ..." for soprano, viola and bassoon (1970); Schweizer Musikedition
Marginalien zu einem Anagramm (Marginalia to an Anagram) for violin and viola (1993)
Ombra for violin, viola and string orchestra (1990)
One in Two, 5 Pieces for shakuhachi and viola (1998)

- Johann Evangelist Brandl (1760–1837)

Notturno in E♭ major for 2 violas and cello, Op. 19 (c.1801)

- Theo Brandmüller (1948–2012)

Au revoir, Monsieur Croche...: Klangfabel nach einem Essay von Claude Debussy for viola and harpsichord (1988); Breitkopf und Härtel
Cis-Cantus II for viola, cello and double bass (1986); Breitkopf und Härtel
Imaginations for viola and chamber ensemble (1991); Breitkopf und Härtel
Konzert auf dem E-Zweig (nach einem Bild von Paul Klee) (Concerto on the "Serious" Branch (after a Painting by Paul Klee)) for viola solo (1991)
Und der Mond heftet ins Meer ein langes Horn aus Licht und Tanz: 5 kosmische Episoden nach Text-Ideen von F. G. Lorca for viola, cello, double bass and orchestra (1992–1993); Breitkopf und Härtel

- Yehezkel Braun (1922–2014)

Er'elei Ma'ala (אראלי מעלה; Angels on High; Heavenly Angels), Variations on an Old Tune for viola and piano (2000); Israel Music Institute
Kinat haShote (קינת השוטה; The Jester's Lament) for viola solo (1968); Israel Music Institute
Shirei Lilith (שירי לילית; Noctuae Carmina) for viola and piano (1979) or orchestra (1989); Israel Music Institute
Thirty-Six Progressive Pieces for Two and Three Violas (1995); Israel Music Institute

- Walter Braunfels (1882–1954)

Schottische Fantasie for viola and orchestra, Op. 47 (1932–1933)
Music (Sinfonia Concertante) for violin solo, viola solo, 2 horns and string orchestra, Op. 68 (1948)

- Reiner Bredemeyer (1929–1995)

Concerto for viola and chamber orchestra (1981)
fUEnfzig fUEr jUErg (Fifty for Jürg) for viola solo (1992)
Solo 3 for viola and J.K.F. (Jean Kurt Forest) (1975); Deutscher Verlag für Musik
Sonata for viola and piano (1995)
Sonata for violin, viola and piano (1967)
Triostücke for flute, viola and bass clarinet (1962)
Triostücke 3 in fünf Sätzen for viola, guitar and double bass (1983); Deutscher Verlag für Musik
Triostücke 4 for clarinet, viola and piano (1985); Deutscher Verlag für Musik
Varianten for viola, bassoon and piano (1960)

- Ilona Breģe (b. 1959)

Divi liriski intermeco (2 Lyrical Intermezzos) for viola and piano (1984)
Otrais Rīgas koncerts (Riga Concerto No. 2) for violin, viola and chamber orchestra (2007)

- Erling Brene (1896–1980)

Concerto for viola and orchestra (1948–1949); SNYK

- Thérèse Brenet (b. 1935)

Aeterno certamine for viola, cello, percussion and string orchestra (1990)
Anamnèse for female voice and viola (1982)
Anamnèse II for mezzo-soprano, viola and chamber ensemble (1996)
Les Chants du Sommeil et de la Mort for violin, viola and Celtic harp (1984)
Ophiucus V.P.8B for viola and guitar (1984)

- Cesar Bresgen (1913–1988)

Sonata No. 1 for viola and piano (1937); Willy Müller
Sonata No. 2 for viola and piano (1946); Willy Müller

- Jean-Baptiste Bréval (1753–1823)

6 Duets for violin and viola, Op. 15 (1784)

- Pierre de Bréville (1861–1949)

Prière (d'après le Cantique de Molière) for violin (or viola) and organ (1924); Rouart-Lerolle & Cie.
Sonata for viola and piano (1944); Éditions Max Eschig

- Luc Brewaeys (1959–2015)

Utopia for 4 violas (2003–2004)
Violacello for viola and cello (2000)

- Frank Bridge (1879–1941)

Allegro appassionato in B minor for viola and piano, H. 82 (1908); Stainer & Bell
2 Pieces for viola and piano, H. 53 (1905)
1. Pensiero in F minor; Stainer & Bell
2. Allegretto in A major; final bars left incomplete; completed by Paul Hindmarsh in 1980; Thames Publishing
2 Pieces for 2 violas, H. 101 (1911–1912)
1. Caprice in D major; incomplete
2. Lament in C minor; Thames Publishing
Sonata in D minor for viola and piano, H. 125 (1913–1917); transcription of the Cello Sonata by Veronica Leigh Jacobs; Thames Publishing
There Is a Willow Grows Aslant a Brook for viola and piano, H. 173 (1927); after Shakespeare’s Hamlet; transcription by Benjamin Britten (1932); Thames Publishing
3 Songs for voice, viola and piano, H. 76 (1906–1907); Thames Publishing

- Alexander Brincken (b. 1952)

Concerto Grosso for viola and string orchestra, Op. 15 (1991–1992)

- Benjamin Britten (1913–1976)

Double Concerto in B minor for violin, viola and orchestra (1932); Oxford University Press; Chester Music
Elegy for viola solo (1930); Faber Music
Etude for viola solo (1929)
Lachrymae – Reflections on a Song by John Dowland for viola and piano, Op. 48 (1950); for viola and string orchestra, Op. 48a (1976); Boosey & Hawkes
Reflection for viola and piano (1930); Faber Music
Two Portraits for strings: No. 2 ‘E.B.B.’ for viola and string orchestra (1930); Oxford University Press; Chester Music

- František Xaver Brixi (1732–1771)

Concerto in C major for viola and orchestra; Edition Schott

- Carolyn Waters Broe

Rebirth of the Goddess for flute, viola and harp (1992); Classics Unlimited Music
Tokudo, The Gate of Enlightenment for viola solo (1983); Classics Unlimited Music

- Dirk Brossé (b. 1960)

Black, White and in Between for violin or viola and string orchestra (1998)
Hope from Artesia for soprano, viola (or English horn) and piano (2006

- Salvador Brotons (b. 1959)

Ad Infinitum for flute, viola and harp (1976, revised 1991); Brotons & Mercadal Edicions Musicals; Clivis Publicacions
Concerto for viola and string orchestra, Op. 106 (2006); Brotons & Mercadal Edicions Musicals
Sonata for viola and piano, Op. 28 (1982); Brotons & Mercadal Edicions Musicals; Clivis Publicacions

- Alexander Brott (1915–2005)

Profundum praedictum for viola and string orchestra (1964); Canadian Music Centre

- Bruce Broughton (b. 1945)

The Fingerprints of Childhood, Trio for flute, violin and viola (2002); Brubel Music
There Is Always Something to Do (for Morelle) for flute, viola and harp (2011); Fatrock Ink
Timeline (1945 – ) for horn, viola and piano (2009); Brubel Music
Tyvek Wood, Trio for flute, viola and harp (1999); Fatrock Ink

- Margaret Brouwer (b. 1940)

Concerto for viola and orchestra (2009); Pembroke Music
Dream Drifts for viola (with tape delay) and piano (with percussion) (1983)
Rhapsodic Sonata for viola and piano (2009); published 2010; Brouwer New Music Publishing
Two Pieces for viola and piano (1989); Pembroke Music
1. X^{4} – 1 = 0
2. Chaconne^{2}

- Stephen Brown (b. 1948)

The Changeling, Trio for viola, cello and piano (2017)
6 Duets for 2 violas (1996); original for 2 violins
Takkakaw Falls, Suite for viola solo (2003, 2004)
There Was a Lady in the East, Suite for viola solo (2007)

- František Brož (1896–1962)

Jarní sonáta (Spring Sonata) for viola and piano, Op. 18 (1946); Orbis

- Max Bruch (1838–1920)

Canzone in B♭ major for viola and piano, Op. 55 (c.1891); original for cello and orchestra
Concerto in E minor for clarinet (or violin), viola and orchestra, Op. 88 (1911)
8 Stücke for clarinet, viola and piano, Op. 83 (1910)
Kol Nidrei for viola and orchestra, Op. 47 (1880); original for cello and orchestra
Romanze in F major for viola and orchestra, Op. 85 (1911)

- Gerard von Brucken Fock (1859–1935)

Sonata in B♭ minor for viola and piano, Op. 5 (1885); Breitkopf & Härtel

- Colin Brumby (1933–2018)

Abendlied for viola and piano (2001); Wirripang; Australian Music Centre
Arietta for viola and piano (2010); Wirripang; Australian Music Centre
Berceuse for trumpet (or viola) and piano (1995); Australian Music Centre
Chaconne for viola and piano; Australian Music Centre
Concertino for viola and string orchestra (1960); Australian Music Centre
Concerto Tre aspetti di Roma for viola and orchestra (1990); Australian Music Centre
Etude in C minor for viola solo; Australian Music Centre
Mediterranean Suite for viola quartet and double bass (1956); Australian Music Centre
Nocturne for viola and piano; Australian Music Centre
Passacaglia for viola ensemble (7 violas) and piano; Australian Music Centre
Sonatina for viola and piano (1982); Australian Music Centre

- Herbert Brün (1918–2000)

on stilts among ducks for viola and tape (1996); Smith Publications, Baltimore
Sonatina for viola alone, Op. 12 (1950); Smith Publications, Baltimore; Israeli Music Publications; Leeds Music

- Alfred Bruneau (1957–1934)

Romance in F major for horn (or viola, or cello) and orchestra or piano (1880)

- Gaetano Brunetti (1744–1798)

Sonata in D major for viola and basso continuo (1789); Amadeus Verlag

- Antonio Bartolomeo Bruni (1757–1821)

6 Duets for violin and viola, Op. 4
3 Duets for violin and viola, Op. 25
6 Duets for violin and viola, Op. posthumous
6 Duos for 2 violas (1787)
3 Sonatas for viola accompanied by viola (or cello), Op. 27 (c.1800)

- Victor Bruns (1904–1996)

Concerto for viola and orchestra, Op. 69 (1981); Breitkopf & Härtel
Sonata for viola and piano, Op. 60 (1977); Breitkopf & Härtel

- Mark Brunswick (1902–1971)

Fantasia for viola solo (1932); New Valley Music Press

- Bjarne Brustad (1895–1978)

Capricci for violin and viola (1931); Norsk Musikforlag
Concertino for viola and chamber orchestra (1932); Music Information Centre Norway
Norsk Suite (Norwegian Suite) for viola and piano (1926); Edition Harald Lyche
Partita for viola solo (1931, revised 1957); Music Information Centre Norway

- Joanna Bruzdowicz (1943–2021)

Fantasia Hermantica sur le Thème S-A-B-B-E for viola and piano (1979)

- Gavin Bryars (b. 1943)

Epilogue from Wonderlawn for solo viola, electric guitar, bass clarinet, 3 cellos and double bass (1994)
From Mina Harker's Journal for baritone and viola (1994)
Lauda (con Sordino) for cello or viola, piano and optional electric guitar (2002); Edition Schott
The North Shore for viola and piano (1993); Edition Schott
The Old Tower of Löbenicht for solo violin or viola and ensemble (1987); Edition Schott

- Benedikt Brydern (b. 1966)

Bebop for Beagles for violin and viola (2007)
From My Notebook, Volume 2 for violin and viola (2001)
Hollywood Nocturne for flute, viola and harp (2004); Fat Rock Ink
Pedestrian Crossing for 4 violas (1999); Gems Music Publications
Strings in Paradise for 4 violas, drums and bass (1998)
Strings on Vacation, Mini Tone Poem for 4 violas, clarinet and bassoon (1999)
Tales From The Bavarian Woods for 2 violins and viola (2002)

=== Bu ===
- Valentino Bucchi (1916–1976)

Concerto di Concerti for string orchestra with violin, viola, cello and double bass obligati (1974); Carisch, Milano
Soliloquios, Monodrama for viola solo (1976); Associazione Musicale Valentino Bucchi

- Thomas Buchholz (b. 1961)

Fluxion III "Letzte Wache" (Fluxion III "The Last Guard") for English horn, viola and bassoon (1994); Ebert Musik Verlag
Frühlingstrio (Spring Trio) for violin, viola and piano (1999); Ebert Musik Verlag
Lacrymæ, Concerto for viola and mixed chorus a cappella (2002); Verlag Neue Musik
Trio for violin, viola and organ (2004); original for violin, cello and organ; Ebert Musik Verlag
Zwei Rhapsodien (2 Rhapsodies) for viola and guitar (1990); Verlag Neue Musik

- Gunnar Bucht (b. 1927)

Concerto de Marle for viola and orchestra (1998); STIM; Swedish Music Information Centre
Sinfonia Concertante for flute, viola, harp and orchestra (1981–1982); STIM; Swedish Music Information Centre

- Linda Buckley (b. 1979)

do you remember the planets? for viola and tape (2004); Contemporary Music Centre Ireland

- Walter Buczynski (b. 1933)

Lyric VII for viola and orchestra (1991)
Sonata No. 2 for viola and piano (1982); Canadian Music Centre

- Antonio (Antonino) Buenaventura (1904–1996)

Sonata for viola and piano (1969)

- Glenn Buhr (b. 1954)

Cantilène elégiaque for viola and harp (1982); Canadian Music Centre
Concerto for viola and orchestra (1994); Canadian Music Centre
Variazioni for viola and piano (1989); Canadian Music Centre

- Zbigniew Bujarski (1933–2018)

Lęk ptaków (The Fear of Birds) for violin, viola and percussion (1993); Polskie Wydawnictwo Muzyczne

- Pyotr Bulakhov (1822–1885)

Barcarolle (Баркарола) for 2 violas and piano; transcription by Vadim Borisovsky (1950); Gosudarstvennoe muzykalnoe izdatelstvo (State Music Publishing House); Leeds Music
Canzonetta (Канцонетта) for viola and piano; transcription by Vadim Borisovsky (1946)

- Edvard Hagerup Bull (1922–2012)

Duo for viola and piano, Op. 44b (1973); Music Information Centre Norway
3 Morceaux Brefs for viola and orchestra (or piano), Op. 17b (1955); Music Information Centre Norway

- Kenji Bunch (b. 1973)

3 American Folk Hymn Settings for 2 violas (2001, 2008); original for 2 violins; Kenji Bunch Music Publishing
The 3 G's for solo viola (2005); Kenji Bunch Music Publishing
Common Tones for violin/viola, horn and piano (2000); Kenji Bunch Music Publishing
Cookbook for viola and piano (2004, 2006); original for clarinet and piano; Kenji Bunch Music Publishing
Crawl Space for viola solo (1996, 2004); original for cello solo; Kenji Bunch Music Publishing
The Devil's Box for viola and orchestra (2011); Kenji Bunch Music Publishing
Drift...an Eventual Lullaby for clarinet, viola, and piano (2006); Kenji Bunch Music Publishing
The Eternal Return for viola solo (2011); Kenji Bunch Music Publishing
From the Verdant Kingdom, Duo for viola and vibraphone (2009); Kenji Bunch Music Publishing
Ghost Reel for violin, viola (doubling jaw harp) and banjo (2006); Kenji Bunch Music Publishing
The Golden Apples of the Sun for viola and chamber orchestra (2006); Kenji Bunch Music Publishing
Hobgoblinry for viola and harpsichord (2002); Kenji Bunch Music Publishing
I Dream in Evergreen for viola and piano (2008); Kenji Bunch Music Publishing
laissez vibrer... for viola and celeste (1998); Kenji Bunch Music Publishing
Lost and Found for viola and percussion (2010); Kenji Bunch Music Publishing
Rise (and Shine) for viola ensemble (2016)
Suite for viola and piano (1998); Kenji Bunch Music Publishing
Until Next Time for viola solo (2010); Kenji Bunch Music Publishing
Verso for violin, viola, string orchestra and harpsichord (2010); Kenji Bunch Music Publishing

- Revol Bunin (1924–1976)

Concerto in G major for viola and orchestra, Op. 22 (1953); Gosudarstvennoe muzykalnoe izdatelstvo (State Music Publishing House)
Poem for viola and orchestra (1952)
Sonata in D minor for viola and piano, Op. 26 (1955); Sovetsky Kompozitor
Suite for viola and piano (1955)

- John Burge (b. 1961)

String Theory for viola and piano (2012); Canadian Music Centre

- Jarmil Burghauser (1921–1997)

Sonata for viola and piano (1985); Český Hudební Fond

- Geoffrey Burgon (1941–2010)

Concerto "Ghosts of the Dance" for viola and orchestra (2008); Chester Music
Six Studies for viola solo (1980, 2000); original for cello solo; Chester Music
Songs of Mary for mezzo-soprano, viola and piano (1970); Chester Music

- Caleb Burhans (b. 1980)

Going Home to Venus for viola solo (2002); Burning Hands Publishing
Keymaster for flute, viola and harp (2005); Burning Hands Publishing
On the Wings of Mercury for oboe and viola (2003); Burning Hands Publishing
Unspeakable Truths for viola and CD (2007); Burning Hands Publishing
You Could Hear It Touch the Viking for viola solo (2007); Burning Hands Publishing

- Willy Burkhard (1900–1955)

Concerto for viola and orchestra, Op. 93 (1953–1954); Bärenreiter Verlag
Kleine Serenade for violin and viola, Op. 15 (1927); Bärenreiter Verlag
Sonata for solo viola, Op. 59 (1939); Claves; Bärenreiter Verlag

- Willy Burmester (1869–1933)

Französisches Lied aus dem 18. Jahrhundert (French Air from the 18th Century) for viola and piano (1909); original for violin and piano; adaptation by Lionel Tertis; Edition Schott

- Diana Burrell (b. 1948)

Concerto “...calling, leaping, crying, dancing...” for viola and orchestra (1994); United Music Publishers
Songs for Harvey for viola solo (1988); United Music Publishers

- Benjamin Burrows (1891–1966)

Lament and Gigue for viola and piano (1927); Augener
On Shadowy Waters for viola and piano (1919); Augener
Sonata for viola and piano (1932–1933); British Music Information Centre

- Mervyn Burtch (1929–2015)

Duo for viola and harp; Welsh Music Information Centre
Phantasy for viola solo (1995); Welsh Music Information Centre
Sonata for viola and piano (2004); Welsh Music Information Centre

- Gerald Busby (b. 1935)

Viola, Aria from the Chamber Opera Orpheus in Love for mezzo-soprano and viola (1982); words by Craig Lucas

- Adolf Busch (1891–1952)

3 Lieder for high voice, viola, and piano, Op. 3a
3 Lieder for high voice, viola, and piano, Op. 23b (1917)
Suite in A minor for viola solo, Op. 16a; Amadeus Verlag

- Alan Bush (1900–1995)

Sonatina for viola and piano, Op. 88 (1978); N. Simrock
Three Contrapuntal Studies for violin and viola, Op. 13 (1929)
Two Melodies for viola and piano, Op. 47 (1957); Joseph Williams

- Ferruccio Busoni (1866–1924)

Albumblatt (Album Leaf) in E minor for viola and piano, BV 272 (1916); original for flute (or violin) and piano; adaptation by Paul Klengel; Breitkopf & Härtel

- Howard J. Buss (b. 1951)

Divergences for viola and clarinet (2020); Cimarron Music Press
Duo for viola and bassoon (1977)
Ocean Moods for flute, clarinet, violin, viola and cello (2014); Cimarron Music Press
Reverie for clarinet, viola and piano (1992); Cimarron Music Press
Spring Reverie for viola, cello, and bassoon (2023); Cimarron Music Press
Tennessee Suite for flute, viola and piano (2002); Cimarron Music Press
Three Character Sketches for Solo Viola (2014); Cimarron Music Press

- Henri Büsser (1872–1973)

Appassionato in C♯ minor for viola and piano, Op. 34 (1910); United Music Publishers
Catalane sur des airs populaires for viola and orchestra or piano, Op. 78 (1926); Henry Lemoine
Rhapsodie arménienne sur des thèmes populaire in B minor for viola and piano, Op. 81 (1930); Éditions Alphonse Leduc; United Music Publishers

- Sylvano Bussotti (1931–2021)

Culbianco e Capinera for viola solo (1986); G. Ricordi
Intermezzo for viola and orchestra (1984); first movement from Il Catalogo è questo III [Trittico]; G. Ricordi
Nudino for viola and piano (1937, 1984); G. Ricordi
Nudo disteso, Cadenza for viola solo (1980); G. Ricordi
Ping-pong-gemello for violin and viola (1992)

- Martin Butler (b. 1960)

Walden Snow for viola and piano (2004); Oxford University Press; Goodmusic Publishing

- Yuri Butsko (1938–2015)

Concerto No. 2 "Discourse on War and Peace" (Рассуждение о Войне и Мире) for viola and orchestra (2001); Muzyka Moscow
Sonata for viola and piano (1976); Sovetsky Kompozitor; Sikorski

- Nigel Butterley (1935–2022)

Forest I for viola and piano (1990); Australian Music Centre

- Arthur Butterworth (1923–2014)

Bubu for English horn, viola and harp, Op. 107 (1999)
Pastorale for viola and piano, Op. 112 (2002); Comus Edition
Sonata for viola and piano, Op. 78 (1986); Comus Edition
Suite for viola and cello, Op. 13 (1951); Hinrichsen Edition; Edition Peters
Concerto for viola and orchestra, Op. 82 (1988–1992); Comus Edition

=== By ===
- Garrett Byrnes (b. 1971)

Capriccio improvviso for viola and piano (2013); Musica Cosmopolita
Devil in Moscow for viola and harpsichord (2009); Musica Cosmopolita
Nanna's Lament for viola solo (1999); Musica Cosmopolita

- Britta Byström (b. 1977)

Dream Day for viola solo (2013); Edition Wilhelm Hansen
Four Walks for viola and double bass (2017); Edition Wilhelm Hansen
A Walk after Dark for viola and orchestra (2013); Edition Wilhelm Hansen
