= Brian Blyth Daubney =

English composer and educator (1929–2022)

Brian Blyth Daubney (10 July 1929 – 4 November 2022) was a song composer, pianist, conductor and music educator. He was born in Bardney, Lincolnshire and studied at Queen Elizabeth Grammar School, Horncastle, Lincolnshire, and from 1947 at the University of Leicester, graduating in 1951. His teachers were Dr Benjamin Burrows (in Leicester) and Kenneth Leighton (at the Royal Marines School of Music in Deal, Kent). Daubney completed an M. Phil thesis on Burrows in 1980, which he adapted and published as a book in 1991, and he was also pianist conductor on several recordings of the music of Burrows.

Returning to Lincolnshire in 1955 (after a year teaching at Woodstock Secondary Modern School) Daubney was appointed Head of Music at the Robert Pattinson (until 1960) and then North Kesteven Grammar Schools in North Hykeham. From 1962 Daubney was Principal Lecturer in Music at the Simon de Montfort University in Leicester. He retired in 1982, continuing work as a part time Examiner for the London College of Music until 1999. Daubney was also involved in theatre: he formed the Bardney Drama Group, was an actor, producer and musical director at the Little Theatre in Leicester, and for fifteen years a producer for Leicester Opera. He was Editor (1990-1993) and later Chairman (1992-1995) of the British Music Society.

After retirement Daubney concentrated on writing music and poetry. He composed over 200 songs, mainly for voice and piano. His chosen texts (such as Hardy, Housman and Yeats) often followed that of his models Ivor Gurney, John Ireland and Gerald Finzi, but he also struck out on his own, setting poems by his exact contemporary John Alan Davis, and by the American surrealist poet Theodora Goss (born 1968). A recording of thirty songs was issued by the British Music Society in 2006. Daubney also composed more extended theatre music and choral works for the church, including a Requiem, Six Psalms and a Stabat Mater for SATB choir and organ (2001).

He lived with his partner Bob Ford for over 50 years. In the late 1980s their address was Summerfields, 8 King Street in Twyford, where they would sometimes host concerts. They moved to Southrey in 1999. Ford died in 2008. Daubney died in November 1922, aged 93.

== Selected songs ==
- The Storm (William Barnes) C
- Wantage Bells (John Betjeman)
- Cradle Song (William Blake)
- On the Death of Anne Bronte (Charlotte Bronte)
- Boot and Saddle (Robert Browning) B
- John Anderson, my Jo (Robert Burns)
- She Walks in Beauty (Lord Byron)
- So We’ll Go No More A-roving (Lord Byron)
- We Two Parted (Lord Byron)
- Hidden Love (John Clare)
- Song’s Eternity (John Clare)
- Young Friend (Hartley Coleridge) A
- Hospital Grapes (John Alan Davis) A
- I must go and sleep (John Alan Davis) A
- Mother Redcap (John Alan Davis) A
- October Roses (John Alan Davis) A
- Resurection Spiritual (John Alan Davis)
- Because I could not stop for death (Emily Dickinson) B
- Autumn, The Fool (Theodora Goss) A
- Dirge for a Lady (Theodora Goss)
- Echo and Narcissus (Theodora Goss) A
- The Frost (Theodora Goss) A
- Goblin Song (Theodora Goss) A
- Helen in Sparta (Theodora Goss) A
- She hath an Art (Theodora Goss) A
- The Singer (Theodora Goss) A
- Severn Meadows (Ivor Gurney)
- Lyonnesse (Thomas Hardy)
- The Sigh (Thomas Hardy)
- Waiting Both (Thomas Hardy) B
- September (F. W. Harvey)
- If we return (F. W. Harvey)
- The curse (F. W. Harvey)
- Bredon Hill (A. E. Housman) B
- The Lent Lily (A. E. Housman) A
- The Land of Lost Content (A. E. Housman) D
- March (A. E. Houseman) A
- Shed No Tear (John Keats)
- The Ship of Rio (Walter de la Mare)
- Absence (Charlotte Mew) A
- Natura Naturans (Kathleen Raine)
- Songs for Children (Christina Rossetti)
  - 'Ferry Me Across the Water'
  - 'The Linnets' Song'
  - 'Winter is Cold-Hearted'
  - 'Holly Prickly Shining Holly'
  - 'Bride and Groom'
  - 'Sand'
  - 'Hope is Like a Harbell'
  - 'Windflowers'
- When I am dead, my dearest (Christina Rossetti)
- A Rose for Lidice (Randall Swingler) A
- There is sweet music here (Alfred, Lord Tennyson)
- The Dream-City (Humbert Wolfe) B
- The Cloths of Heaven (W. B. Yeats)
- The Fiddler of Dooney (W. B Yeats)
- The Folly of Being Comforted (W. B Yeats)
- Lake Isle of Innisfree (W. B Yeats)

=== Recordings ===
- A October Roses: Songs by Brian Blyth Daubney, British Music Society BMS 433CD (2009)
- B Sappho, Shropshire and Super-Tramp: A Collection of Modern English Art-Song, Divine Art DDA21230 (2018)
- C Songs of Dorset, Divine Art DDV24163 (2017)
- D Shropshire Lads: Songs to the Poems of AE Housman, Divine Art DDV24162 (2017)
