= Grace Burrows =

British musician (1893–1981)

- Genres: Classical
- Occupations: Musician; Music educator Orchestra conductor
- Instrument: Violin
- Spouse: Horace William Lee (1889–1976)

Grace Burrows (29 June 1893 – 1981) was an English violinist, violin teacher and orchestral conductor.

== Life and career ==
Grace Burrows was born in Leicester, the daughter of Dr. Benjamin Harper Burrows (1864–1915) who served as organist for a number of churches in the Leicester area. She was also the sister of composer Benjamin Burrows (1891–1966). In the early 1920s she played viola in an ensemble called The Birmingham Quartet. She was appointed as a lecturer in music at the University College, Leicester, in 1924. In 1922 she served as the founding leader of the Leicester Symphony Orchestra, and in 1934 she also conducted the British Women's Symphony Orchestra. She died at age 87. Notable students include Joyce Howard Barrell.

== Works ==
Although best known as a violinist, teacher and orchestra leader, Burrows also published didactic music for violin. Selected works include:

- Easy Exercises and Studies in the Third Position (1935)
