= F. W. Harvey =

English poet, 1888–1957

Frederick William Harvey
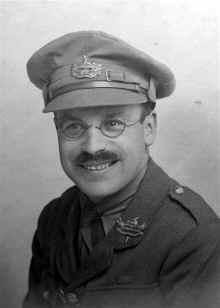
- Photograph of F. W. Harvey circa 1916.
- Born: 26 March 1888; Hartpury, Gloucestershire, England
- Died: 13 February 1957 (aged 68); Yorkley, Gloucestershire, England
- Resting place: Saint Peter's Church, Minsterworth, Gloucestershire
- Occupations: Poet, Soldier, Lawyer
- Spouse: Sarah Anne Kane
- Writing career
- Genres: Poetry, Autobiography, Radio
- Notable works: A Gloucestershire Lad at Home and Abroad, Gloucestershire Friends: Poems from a German Prison Camp, Ducks, and other Verses, Comrades in Captivity
- Notable awards: Distinguished Conduct Medal

Frederick William Harvey DCM (26 March 1888 – 13 February 1957), often known as Will Harvey, was an English poet, broadcaster and solicitor. His poetry became widely popular during and after World War I.

== Early life ==
Harvey was born in 1888 in Hartpury, Gloucestershire, and grew up in Minsterworth. He was educated at the King's School, Gloucester, where he formed a close friendship with Ivor Gurney, and then at Rossall School. Gurney and Herbert Howells, another local composer, later set a number of his poems to music.

He started on a legal career, which would always be somewhat tentative; and began to consider conversion to Roman Catholicism.

== World War I ==
On 8 August 1914, four days after the United Kingdom had declared war on Germany, Harvey joined the 5th Battalion, Gloucestershire Regiment as a private. Shortly afterwards, in November, he became a Roman Catholic. He was an adherent of the distributism movement, described as a "third way", in opposition to both socialism and capitalism; and he was influenced by the work of G. K. Chesterton and Hilaire Belloc.

His battalion was posted to France in March 1915, where he was promoted to lance corporal and awarded the Distinguished Conduct Medal. His citation for the DCM reads:

2371 Lance-Corpl. F. W. Harvey, 1/5th Gloucestershire R[egiment]. (T.F.) For conspicuous gallantry on the night of Aug. 3–4, 1915, near Hebuterne, when, with a patrol, he and another non-commissioned officer went out to reconnoitre in the direction of a suspected listening-post. In advancing they encountered the hostile post, evidently covering a working party in the rear. Corporal Knight at once shot one of the enemy, and, with Lance-Corporal Harvey, rushed the post, shooting two others, and, assistance arriving, the enemy fled. Lance-Corporal Harvey pursued, felling one of the retreating Germans with a bludgeon. He seized him, but, finding his revolver empty and the enemy having opened fire, he was called back by Corporal Knight, and the prisoner escaped. Three Germans were killed, and their rifles and a Mauser pistol were brought in. The patrol had no loss.

Harvey returned to England for officer training, but after being commissioned and returning to France he was captured on 17 August 1916 in the German front-line trench while carrying out a reconnaissance patrol. He spent the rest of the war in prisoner-of-war camps, including those at Gütersloh, Crefeld, Schwarmstedt, Holzminden, Bad Colberg, and Stralsund.

== Writing ==
Soon after his arrival in France, Harvey began to contribute to a trench newspaper, the Fifth Gloucester Gazette. His first volume of poems, A Gloucestershire Lad at Home and Abroad, was published in September 1916, shortly after his capture. He began to write more intensively in captivity, and poems were sent back to England for publication: his second collection, Gloucestershire Friends, appeared in 1917. His time in the camps is held to be his most productive period of writing. On returning from a spell of solitary confinement at Holzminden after a failed escape attempt, he saw that a fellow prisoner had drawn a picture over his bed in chalk of ducks in a pool of water. This inspired his most celebrated poem (and the title poem of his third collection, published in 1919), "Ducks".

== Post-war life ==
Harvey returned home in 1919, married in 1921, and returned to legal practice. He became a respected and loved figure in the Forest of Dean. He worked largely as a defence solicitor (his own captivity convincing him that incarceration was destructive and pointless), and became known as the "poor man's solicitor". His work was not financially successful, and in the 1930s he sold off his practice.

In 1920 he published a memoir of his prison-camp experiences, Comrades in Captivity; and in 1921 Farewell, an acknowledgement of his intention to remove himself from the literary world. He had a brief creative union with his great friend and collaborator, Ivor Gurney. Gurney had written "After-Glow" and "To His Love" for Harvey, on hearing of his supposed death in 1916; and "Ypres-Minsterworth" as a gesture of solidarity with him in his captivity. Their reunion was cut sadly short by Gurney's mental breakdown in 1922.

Harvey's gift for oration and his versatile voice and scripting led him to become a popular broadcaster at the BBC, Bristol, where he used his popularity to promote the Forest of Dean, its people and traditions. He furthered local choirs, musicians and young authors such as Leonard Clark. He was friends with Rutland Boughton and the local MP, Morgan Philips Price, who worked with him to promote the arts and the interests of Foresters.

== Later years ==
In later life Harvey craved the comradeship he had found in the trenches and was saddened that the new social order he had expected never appeared. His later poetry of remembrance captured those feelings, but retained the essential humour of his early work and included verse in local dialect.

He died in 1957 and was buried at Minsterworth.

== Personal life ==
In 1921 Harvey married Anne Kane, an Irish nurse. They had two children, Eileen Anne (born 1922) and Patrick (born 1925). He led a Bohemian lifestyle, rejecting material values, and often recklessly gave away his professional services and income.

== Reputation and legacy ==
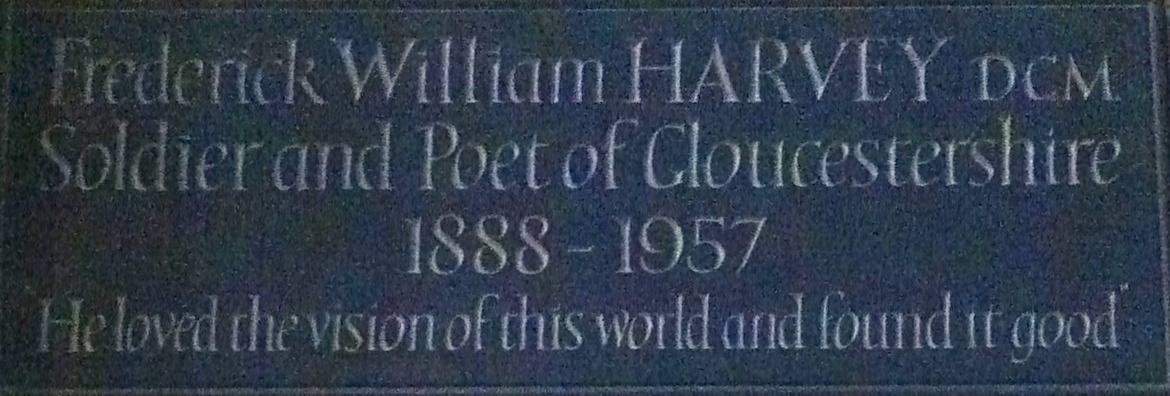
Memorial in Gloucester Cathedral

Harvey's poems published during and immediately after the First World War were acclaimed, and his status was acknowledged when a collection was published in 1926 in the Augustan Books of Modern Poetry series, edited by Edward Thompson.

The lyricism of his poetry led to it being set to music by his friends Ivor Gurney, Herbert Howells and Sir Herbert Brewer, and others, including post-Second World War composers such as Johnny Coppin and Brian Blyth Daubney. His work is noted particularly for its appreciation of the natural world and the landscape and traditions of West Gloucestershire.

Harvey was commemorated in 1980 by a slate memorial tablet in the south transept of Gloucester Cathedral. "Ducks", Harvey's best known verse, was voted one of the nation's 100 favourite poems in 1996 in a nationwide poll conducted by the BBC.

== Works ==
=== Poetry collections ===
- A Gloucestershire Lad at Home and Abroad. London: Sidgwick & Jackson. 1916.
- Gloucestershire Friends: Poems from a German Prison Camp. London: Sidgwick & Jackson. 1917.
- Ducks, and other Verses. London: Sidgwick & Jackson. 1919.
- Farewell. London: Sidgwick & Jackson. 1921.
- September and Other Poems. London: Sidgwick & Jackson. 1925.
- In Pillowell Woods. Lydney: Frank Harris. 1926.
- Gloucestershire: A Selection from the Poems of F. W. Harvey. Edinburgh: Oliver & Boyd. 1947.

=== Edited collections ===
- Thompson, Edward, ed. (1926). The Augustan Books of Modern Poetry: Frederick William Harvey. London: Ernest Benn.
- Forest Offering: A Selection from the Unpublished Poems of F. W. Harvey, 1888–1957. Frank Green. 1962.
- F. W. Harvey: Collected Poems 1912–1957. Coleford: Douglas McLean. 1983.
- Boden, Anthony; Thornton, R. K. R., eds. (2011). F. W. Harvey: Selected Poems. Coleford: Douglas McLean.

=== Novel ===
- Harvey, F. W. (2014). A War Romance. Stroud, Glos.: The History Press.

=== War memoirs ===
- Harvey, F. W. (1920). Comrades in Captivity: a Record of Life in Seven German Prison Camps. London: Sidgwick & Jackson.

== Bibliography ==
- Boden, Anthony (2011). F. W. Harvey: Soldier, Poet (revised & expanded ed.). Douglas McLean. ISBN 9780946252800.
- Childs, Peter (2011) [2004]. "Harvey, Frederick William (1888–1957)". Oxford Dictionary of National Biography (online ed.). Oxford University Press. doi:10.1093/ref:odnb/75642. (Subscription, Wikipedia Library access or UK public library membership required.)
- Clark, Leonard (1965). A Fool in the Forest. London: Dennis Dobson.
- Davies, Ross (2009). F. W. Harvey: Poet of Remembrance. The War Poets Series. London: Cecil Woolf. ISBN 978-1-897967-96-6.
- Harvey, F. W. (1920). Comrades in Captivity: a Record of Life in Seven German Prison Camps. London: Sidgwick & Jackson. ISBN 9781297529542.
- Tandy, Bill (1979). A Doctor in the Forest. Coleford: Douglas McLean. ISBN 0950592617.
- Townsend, Frances (1988). The Laureate of Gloucestershire. Bristol: Redcliffe Press. ISBN 0948265671.
- Waters, Brian (1951). The Forest of Dean. London: J.M. Dent.
