= Bernard Barrell =

English musician, music educator and composer

Bernard Clements Barrell
- Born: 15 August 1919; Sudbury, Suffolk, England
- Died: 2 January 2005 (aged 85)
- Education: Trinity College of Music
- Occupations: Composer, music educator, conductor
- Years active: 1940s–2000s
- Notable work: Chamber music, educational works
- Spouse: Joyce Howard Barrell

Bernard Clements Barrell (15 August 1919 – 2 January 2005) was an English musician, music educator and composer.

== Biography ==
Bernard Barrell was born in Sudbury, Suffolk, and studied at Trinity College of Music, London. He served in World War II and returned to England, where he took various teaching appointments in Hollesley Bay Borstal, Ipswich schools, the Suffolk Rural Music School and the Workers’ Educational Association. He served as conductor of the Woodbridge Orchestra and as an adjudicator for the British Federation of Musical Festivals. He married composer Joyce Howard Gedye.

== Selected works ==
=== Orchestra ===
- Hommage à Ravel, Suite for small orchestra, Op.1 (1938)
- Diversions on an Original Theme for string orchestra, Op.2 (1938)
- Sarabande for small orchestra, Op.4 (1939)
- Four Studies for string orchestra, Op.8 (1951)
- Fugue for string orchestra, Op.11 (1954)
- East Anglian Holiday Overture, Op.14 (1956)
- A Carol Prelude for string orchestra and 3 recorders, Op.17 (1958)
- Festival Voluntary for string orchestra and 3 recorders, Op.18 (1959)
- Meditation on an Old French Melody for small orchestra, Op.27 (1960)
- Two Christmas Preludes for recorders and string orchestra, Op.32 (1961)
- Overture "Suffolk Celebration", Op.44 (1965)
- Epitaph for Zoltán Kodály for string orchestra with glockenspiel and 2 recorders, Op.49 (1967)
- Symphony for Strings (in One Movement), Op.62 (1971)
- Sinfonia for chamber orchestra, Op.112 (1987)
- The Christchurch Variations for string orchestra, Op.116 (1988)
- Gala Day, Overture, Op.118 (1989, 1994)
- The Village Variations, Theme and Variations for school orchestra, Op.126 (1991)
- From the Waveney Valley, Symphonic Movement, Op.129 (1993)

=== Band ===
- Beckford Suite for brass band, Op.76 (1975)
- Fugal Flourish for brass band, Op.77 (1975)

=== Concertante ===
- Concerto Comodo for solo instrument and string orchestra, Op.29 (1961)
- A Little Concerto for descant recorder and string orchestra, Op.108 (1984)

=== Chamber music ===
- Soliloquy for cello (or violin, or viola, or clarinet) and piano, Op.3 (1939)
- Two Studies for clarinet and piano, Op.9 (1953)
- Music for Three for 3 recorders, Op.10 (1953)
- Music for Five for 5 recorders, Op.12 (1956)
- Music for Four for 4 recorders, Op.13 (1956)
- Recorder Trio for 3 recorders, Op.16 (1958)
- A Pentachord Suite for descant recorder and piano, Op.19 (1959)
- Suite for Brass for 2 trumpets and 2 trombones (or horn and trombone), Op.21 (1960)
- A Cambridge Suite for descant recorder and piano, Op.22 (1960)
- Conceits, Three Duets for 2 cellos, Op.30 (1961)
- Three Preludes for treble recorder and guitar, Op.31 (1961)
- Suite for cello ensemble (or 3 cellos), Op.33 (1962)
- Soliloquys for cello solo, Op.39 (1963)
- Five Dances for recorder and guitar, Op.40 (1964)
- String Quartet No.1, Op.42 (1965)
- Music for Two, 5 Pieces for 2 recorders (or alternate treble instruments), Op.43 (1965)
- A Present of Pieces for 2 recorders and cello, Op.47 (1966)
- For Harwood's Lute, 4 Pieces for solo lute, Op.51 (1967)
- Divertimento for solo oboe, Op.53 (1968)
- 2 Simple Suites for violin (or violin ensemble) and piano, Op.54 (1968)
- Music for Brass Trio for 2 trumpets and tenor trombone (or 3-part ensemble), Op.55 (1968)
- A Recital of Pieces for recorder and piano, Op.56 (1969)
- Suite for solo guitar, Op.57 (1969)
- Six Contrasts for 2 trumpets, Op.61 (1970)
- Four Pieces for E♭ trumpet and piano, Op.64 (1971)
- A Week of Pieces for trumpet and piano (or string orchestra), Op.65 (1971)
- Opening Gambit for double bass and piano, Op.67 (1972)
- Three Little Trios for 2 trumpets and trombone, Op.69 (1972)
- A Pocket of Pieces for double bass solo, Op.70 (1973)
- Theme and Variations for string trio, Op.72 (1973)
- Partita for violin (or viola) solo, Op.81 (1976)
- Pavan and Galliard for 2 guitars, Op.82 (1977)
- Sonatina for descant recorder and piano, Op.84 (1978)
- Fanfare and Fugato for Brass for 2 trumpets and 2 trombones (or horn and trombone), Op.85 (1978)
- Quartet for Clarinets for 3 clarinets and bass clarinet, Op.86 (1979)
- Three Fives for clarinet solo, Op.89 (1980)
- Five Tunes for treble recorder and piano, Op.93 (1980)
- Duets for Descants, 4 Pieces for 2 descant recorders (or alternative combination), Op.95 (1980)
- A Pageant of Pieces for viola and piano, Op.100 (1982)
- Quintet for Brass for 2 trumpets, horn, trombone and tuba, Op.109 (1984)
- 4 Party Pieces for viola and piano, Op.114 (1987)
- Partnerships, 4 Pieces for 2 violins, Op.122 (1990)
- Mostly Cannons for violins in 3 parts mostly! (or 2 or 1 optional), Op.128 (1991)
- String Quartet No.2, Op.132 (1995)
- Partita for Two, 5 Pieces for 2 recorders, Op.134 (1996)
- Partita for Three, 4 Pieces for 3 recorders, Op.135 (1996)
- Partita for "M" for recorder and piano, Op.136 (1996)

=== Keyboard ===
- Hommage à Ravel, Suite for piano, Op.1a (1938); original version for small orchestra
- Sarabande for piano, Op.4a (1939); original version for small orchestra
- Three Ostinato Studies "Salute to Stravinsky" for piano 4 hands, Op.34 (1962)
- Prelude and Fugue for organ, Op.36 (1962)
- Introduction and Fugue for harpsichord (or piano or clavichord), Op.45 (1966)
- Theme and Reflections for piano 4 hands, Op.48 (1967)
- Sonatina "Sonatina ostinata" for piano, Op.58 (1969)
- Three Portraits for piano, Op.59 (1969)
- Chorale for organ, Op.68 (1972)
- Five Bagatelles for piano, Op.87 (1979)
- The Southwold Railway Centenary Pieces, 7 Pieces for piano, Op.88 (1979)
- A Norfolk Sketchbook, 7 Pieces for piano, Op.90 (1980)
- A Suffolk Sketchbook, 7 Pieces for piano, Op.91 (1980)
- Four Musettes for organ, Op.96 (1981)
- Five Piano Pieces for One Hand, Op.98 (1981)
- Pentad, 5 Pieces for piano, Op.99 (1981)
- Suite for Feet, 4 Pedal-Pieces for organ, Op.105 (1983)
- Five Fancies for organ, Op.107 (1983)
- Left, Right and Centre, 3 Pieces for piano 6 hands, Op.113 (1987)
- Dodecamania for 2 pianos 12 hands, Op.117 (1988)
- Kleine Vorspiel und Fuge for piano, Op.123 (1990)
- Piano Duets, Op.125 (1991)
- 3 Hymn-tune Voluntaries for organ, Op.127 (1991)
- An Aberdeen Suite for carillon (or organ), Op.131 (1994)
- Sarabande and Fughetta for piano, Op.137 (2000)

=== Vocal ===
- Three Songs for tenor (or soprano) and piano, Op.5 (1946–1947); words by Robert Jones, Leigh Hunt, Ben Jonson
- Three Songs for tenor (or soprano) and guitar, Op.50 (1967); words by John Suckling and Robert Herrick
- 5 Shakespeare Songs for medium voice and guitar, Op.83 (1977); words by William Shakespeare
- Songs for Juniors for voice and piano, Op.101 (1982)
- Longfellow's Carol (I Heard the Bells on Christmas Day) for voice or unison voices and piano (or organ), Op.121 (1989)

=== Choral ===
- O God of Earth and Altar for mixed chorus (or unison voices) and string orchestra (or organ, or piano), Op.6 (1948); words by G. K. Chesterton
- I Sing of a Maiden and Lullay My Liking for soprano and mixed chorus a cappella, Op.7 (1948)
- A Hymn for the School for unison voices and piano (or organ), Op.15 (1957); words by Robert Hull
- Missa Brevis for unison voices and organ (or piano), Op.35 (1962)
- Since Singing Is So Good a Thing for female or male chorus a cappella, Op.38 (1963)
- Missa Brevis No.2 for mixed chorus a cappella, Op.41 (1964); Latin text
- Two Introits for unison treble voices and organ (or piano), Op.46 (1966); words from Psalm 139 and Psalm 95
- Two Motets for soprano, alto and tenor unaccompanied, Op.37 (1963)
- A Short Mass in English for mixed voices (3 parts a cappella), Op.52 (1967)
- Missa Brevis No.3 for mixed chorus a cappella, Op.60 (1970)
- Four Hymns for mixed chorus a cappella, Op.63 (1971); words by George Herbert, Charles Wesley and Norman Gale
- Two Carols for unaccompanied mixed voices, Op.66 (1971)
- Five Hymn-Tunes for mixed chorus (or unison voices), Op.71 (1973)
- How Far Is It to Bethlehem?, Carol for unison voices and piano, Op.73 (1973); words by Frances Chesterton
- Mass of Jesus and Mary for unison voices and organ, Op.74 (1974)
- Two 15th Century Carols for female, male or mixed chorus a cappella, Op.75 (1974)
- Three Hymn-Tunes for unison voices (or mixed chorus) and piano (or organ), Op.78 (1975)
- Nativity Music for unison voices and piano (with optional recorders, etc.), Op.80 (1976)
- Dunwich for mixed chorus and orchestra, Op.92 (1980); poem by Victor Allen
- Psalm 150 (O Praise God in His Holiness), Anthem for mixed chorus and organ, Op.94 (1980); words from Psalm 150
- A Round Dozen, 12 Rounds in 2 to 8 parts, Op.102 (1982)
- Two Short Anthems for mixed chorus and organ, Op.103 (1982)
- Three Hymn-Tunes for unison voices and organ (or piano), Op.104 (1982)
- Magnificat an Nunc Dimittis for mixed chorus (or soprano unison) and organ, Op.106 (1983)
- I Was Glad, Anthem for mixed chorus and organ, Op.111 (1986); words from Psalm 122
- A Choral Fanfare (Gloria in excelsis and Amen) for mixed chorus a cappella, Op.115 (1988)
- O Be Joyful in the Lord (Jubilate Deo) for mixed chorus a cappella, Op.119 (1989); words from Psalm 100
- Christemass, 3 Carols for mixed chorus a cappella, Op.120 (1989)
- My Soul There Is a Country, Anthem for mixed chorus and organ, Op.124 (1991)
- Show Yourselves Joyful unto the Lord, Anthem for female chorus and organ, Op.130 (1993); words from Psalm 98
- A Christmas Triptych for mixed chorus a cappella, Op.133 (1995)
