= Joyce Howard Barrell =

English composer

- Born: Joyce Howard Gedye; 26 November 1917; Salisbury, Wiltshire, England
- Died: 6 December 1989 (aged 72); Ipswich, England
- Education: University of Leicester
- Occupations: Composer, teacher, accompanist
- Years active: 1939–1985
- Notable work: Children's music, chamber music
- Spouse: Bernard Barrell

Joyce Howard Barrell (née Gedye; 26 November 1917 – 6 December 1989) was an English composer. She studied with Benjamin Burrows and Harold Craxton for piano and Grace Burrows for violin, and then worked as composer, as a guitar teacher and as a piano accompanist. She married composer Bernard Clements Barrell in 1945. She composed about ninety works, specialising in works for children and chamber music.

== Life ==
Barrell was born Joyce Howard Gedye, on Bouverie Avenue in Salisbury, Wiltshire, England in 1917. Her father was a bank manager for Lloyds Bank, and the family moved around to Bridgwater, Somerset in 1920, then Exeter in 1926 and lastly settled in Leicester. Barrell was educated at Leicester University, studying with Benjamin Burrows and Harold Craxton for piano and Grace Burrows for violin. After completing her studies, Barrell worked as composer and as a guitar teacher and piano accompanist until 1985. She married composer Bernard Clements Barrell in 1945, and they lived in Suffolk. From 1939 until her death she composed about ninety works. Barrell also worked to promote music, singing and music teaching throughout East Anglia with her husband. The couple were friends with Imogen Holst, Benjamin Britten and Peter Pears.

Barrell died in Ipswich, England on 6 December 1989. Her music was published by Anglian, MSM, Occumuse, and Schauer and May, among others. Her archives are held at Britten Pears Arts Archive.

== Selected works ==
Barrell composed mainly chamber music and music for children, but also include works for string quartet, and for soprano, clarinet and piano. Selected works include:

- Dialogues for flute and viola da gamba
- Three Fours for viola and piano, Op.45 (1986)
- The Hacheston Quintet for 2 violins, viola, cello and piano, Op.67a (1988)
- What am I?, 6 Songs for children's chorus and piano, Op.68
- Serenade for saxophones, Op.92
- Nightmare for soprano, clarinet and piano, Op.93; words by Stephen Coates
