= Benjamin Burrows =

British musician (1891–1966)

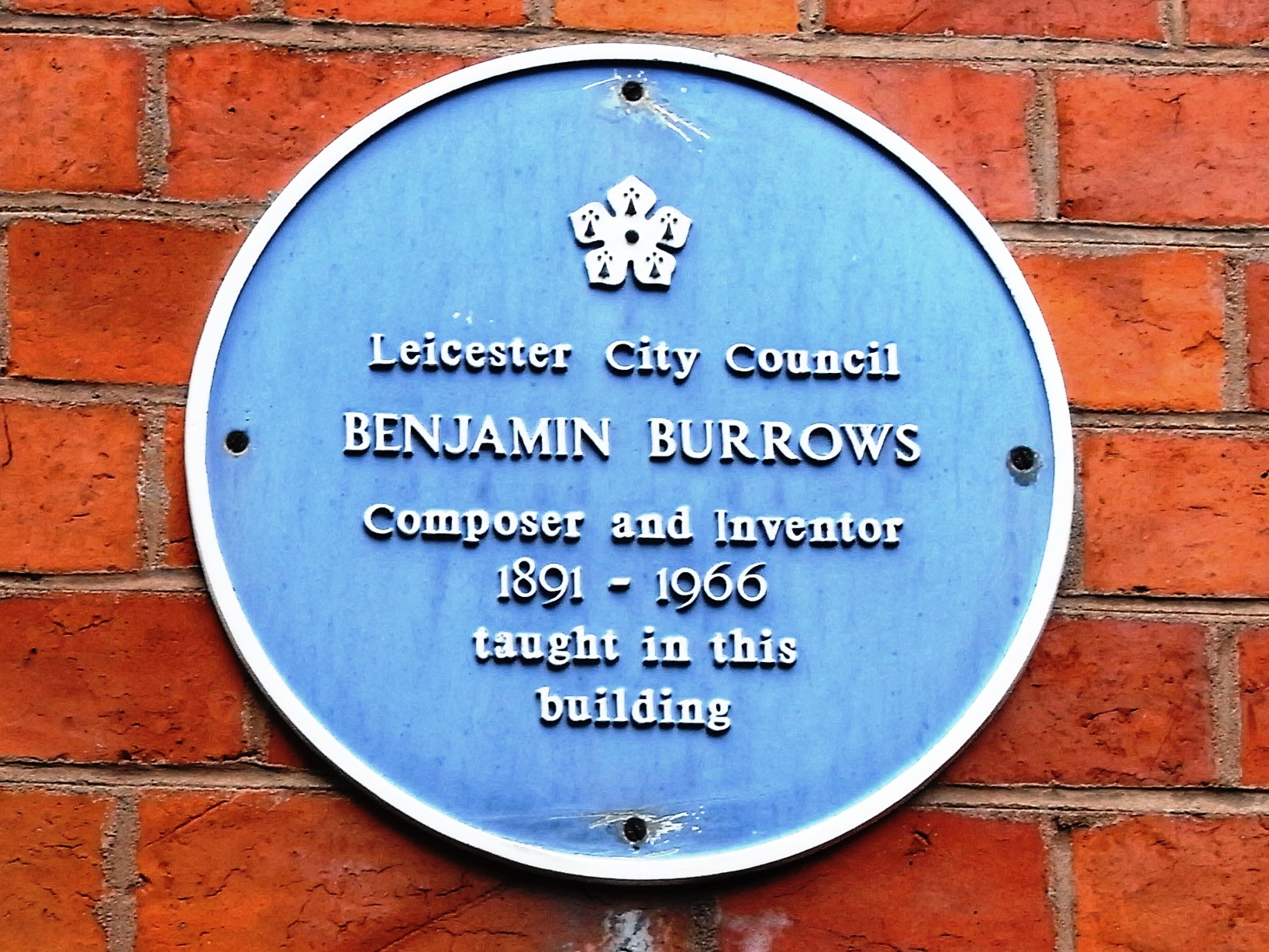
Blue plaque at his former studio at 2 University Road, Leicester

Dr Benjamin Burrows (20 October 1891 – 28 January 1915) in Leicester, England) was an English organist, pianist, music teacher, inventor, composer of art songs and instrumental music. He was known as a modest man and one of the finest teachers of his times.

== Biography ==
Burrows was born in Leicester, England. He was the son of Benjamin Harper Burrows (1864–1915), a scholar and teacher of some repute, who played violin, viola and later cello, and was closely involved with the Leicester Orchestral Union from 1884 until his death. His mother was Mary Elizabeth (born Gray 1867) who was an excellent pianist. His sister was violinist, teacher and orchestra conductor Grace Burrows. He was born at 12 College Street, Leicester and attended Alderman Newton's Boys School. He showed such a marked aptitude for science that he moved to a school specialising in this. Later he was tutored privately which was felt necessary due to a serious problem with his left eye. Music played a huge part in his upbringing and having chosen music as a career, Burrows studied organ with H. P. Ellis and music theory with Charles Kitson. In 1912 he graduated ARCO at the Royal College of Organists and soon afterwards becoming a fellow (FRCO). In both exams he won recognition for achieving top marks. By 1914 he had set up as a music teacher and was giving organ recitals in De Montfort Hall, Leicester. During WW1 he served as a Kite Balloonist at Orford Ness, Suffolk. He also met Doris Katharine Hayes who he married in 1921, the same year in which he was awarded his doctorate. Their only child, Benjamin Hayes Burrows was born in 1925. He served briefly as organist at Leicester Cathedral but in 1929 he was appointed organist at Victoria (now University) Road Church then a Baptist church, in line with his non-conformist principles. He remained there for 27 years.

He worked as music tutor at Leicester University from 1924. His sister Grace was appointed to the same department at the same time. He tutored students in organ and composition up to PhD level for 27 years. He was known to be generous, sympathetic and encouraging. He had many students from all parts of the world as shown by a crop of flags pinned to a map on his studio wall. They were prepared by correspondence which was unusual if not unique at the time. One was the song composer and educator Brian Blyth Daubney, who chose Burrows as the subject for his M. Phil thesis, later publishing it as a book. In teaching composition it seems Burrows had an encyclopaedic knowledge of the subject and had developed an almost computer like system for keeping all aspects of his craft at his fingertips. One student described Ben as, 'without peer in the teaching of musical theory throughout the country'. Another declared he, 'was a marvellous teacher, as his successes show. A few words from him verbally or scrawled on an exercise, were worth books of others!' The successes referred to are the qualifications earned by his pupils; 24 D Mus, 56 B Mus and 104 FRCO. Burrows is noted for his development of a system for music typography and founded his own publishing house, Bodnant Press, to publish his music and teaching monographs. He also had skills as a precision engineer and horologist. Among his prominent music students is the composer Joyce Howard Barrell. Ben's reputation as a major figure on the British music scene was recognised by Leicester City Council who honoured his life and work with a Blue Plaque outside his old studio at 2 University Road. It reads, 'Benjamin Burrows 1891-1966 Composer and Inventor taught in this building.'

== Music ==
Burrows is best known for his art songs. Under the influence and friendship of Jane Vowles, a soprano to whom he taught theory, he composed 93 songs in 21 months. After her parents insisted on her abandoning studies with him, Burrows wrote only one more song (in 1953). His songs have been compared with those by Ivor Gurney and Peter Warlock. They include settings of poetry by A. E. Housman, Rossetti, Herrick, de la Mare, Robert Frost, and Emily Dickinson, several of which have been recorded.

He also composed several instrumental works. Between 1929 and 1935 composed a string quartet and sonatas for violin, viola, violoncello, and piano., In later years he concentrated on church music, for his own use at Leicester church where he was organist from 1929 to 1955.

== Selected compositions ==
=== Orchestral ===
- In Praise of Music for chamber orchestra (1913)
- Lyric Piece No. 2 (1914)
- Lyric Piece No. 3 (1914)
- Dusk for chamber orchestra (1914)
- Dawn for chamber orchestra (1914)
- Poem (1914)
- Prelude (1915)
- Lady of Shalott (1915)
- Three Miniatures (1915)
- Two Valses-Caprices (1916); orchestration of Nos. 2 and 3 from Three Valses for piano
- Song of Darkness and Light for chamber orchestra (1921)
- Folk Song Settings for string orchestra (1943)
- Prelude for string orchestra (1945)

=== Chamber music ===
- Two Pieces for violin, cello and piano (1911)
- Three Trios for violin, cello and piano (1911)
- Variations on an Original Theme for string quartet (1912)
- Second Concert Piece for violin and piano (1918)
- On Shadowy Waters for violin or viola and piano (Augener, 1919)
- Lament and Gigue for viola and piano (Augener, 1927)
- Sonata for violin and piano (1929)
- Sonatina for cello and piano (1930)
- Sonata No. 2 for cello and piano (1931)
- Sonata No. 3 for cello and piano (1932); unfinished; movement III only
- String Quartet (1932)
- Two Movements (String Quartet No. 2) for string quartet (1932?)
- Sonata for viola and piano (1932–1933)
- Suite in C for descant recorder and piano (Schott, 1955)
- Quintet for flute, oboe, clarinet, horn and bassoon (1958)
- Theme, Variations and Finale for oboe and piano (1958)
- Three Pieces for cello and organ (1961)

=== Keyboard ===
- Variations on an Original Theme for organ and piano (1948)

Organ

- Prelude (1911)
- Seven Chorale Preludes (1912)
- Three Impressions (1916); arrangement of Three Easy Pieces for piano
- Prelude (1923)
- Elegy (1923)
- Pastorale (1923)
- Postlude (1923)
- Prelude in F (1925)
- Air (1932?)
- Seven Chorale Preludes
- Seven First Pieces (1948)

Piano

- 4 Pieces (1912)
- 3 Pieces (1912)
- Nocturne (1913)
- Two Picture-Pieces (1913?)

1. Twilight
2. By the Stream

- Sea (1913?)
- Four Pieces (1913)
- Six Compositions (1913)
- Legend (1913)
- Three Melodies (1913)

1. Stillness
2. June Night
3. Consolation

- Suite (1915)
- Valse 2, Dance Rhythms 1 (1916)
- Minuet, Dance Rhythms 2 (1916)
- Lyric (1916?)
- Four Lyrics (1916)
- Four Preludes (1916?)
- By the Fireside, 5 Pieces (1917)

1. The Day Is Done
2. Pleasant Visions
3. Night
4. Resignation
5. Lullaby

- Jig (1919)
- Twelve Studies in Style and Expression (1921)
- Country Idylls (1922)

1. The Close of Day
2. A Hidden Brook
3. Woodland Depths
4. Still Waters
5. The Brookside
6. Summer Night

- Among the Heather (1923)
- Summer Musings (1923)
- Prelude (1924)
- Intermezzo (1924)
- Romance (1924)
- Scherzo (1924)
- Pictures from The Fairy Queen (1925)
- Chimes (1925)
- Fancies, 5 Pieces (1925)
- Variations on Walsingham 16th c. (1926)
- Piano Sonata (1934)
- Valse in E flat (1946)
- Tango (1946)
- Folk Tune "A Young Serving-Man" (1946)
- Twelve Studies (1947)
- A Leicester Tune and Offshoots (Tune 1) (1948?)

Piano 4-hands

- Lady of Shalott (1915); arrangement of the orchestral work
- Under the Rose, Folk song Arrangements (1941)
- Piano Duets, Folk song Arrangements (1941)

2 Pianos

- Brigg Fair, Arrangement (1927)
- Rhapsody (1934)
- Intermezzo (1934)
- Rumba (1944)
- Folk Song Settings (1944–1950)

1. Under the Rose
2. The beggar Boy
3. Admiral Benbow
4. The Northumbrian Bagpipes
5. The Broom
6. Shropshire Round
7. I'm seventeen come Sunday
8. Banstead Down
9. The Banks of the Clyde
10. A Young Serving-Man
11. Gossip Joan
12. My Johnny was a Shoemaker (1945)
13. O Waly Waly (1946)
14. Shackley Hay (1946)
15. Cold Blows the Wind
16. Three Dukes (1947)
17. Captain Grant (1948)
18. Did you ever (from The Beggar's Opera) (1948)
19. Greensleeves (1949)
20. Peas, Beans, Oats and the Barley (1950)
21. The Trees They are So High (1950)
22. Eggs in Her Basket (1950)
23. The Thresherman and the Squire (1950)
24. The Spanish Lady (1950)

- Five Valses (1947–1948)
- Three Fugues (1951)
- Three Irish Airs (1952)
- Three Scottish Airs (1954)

=== Vocal ===
- Weep you no more, sad fountains for voice and piano (1908?)
- How Happy for the Wood Birds for voice and piano (1908)
- Turn Thy Face for voice and piano (1910?)
- Mellow Moon of Heaven for voice and piano (1910?); words by Alfred, Lord Tennyson
- Day Is Dawning for voice and piano (1910)
- White Rose for voice and piano (1910)
- Music, When Soft Voices Die for voice and piano (1914); words by Percy Bysshe Shelley
- Low Sighing Winds for voice and piano (1915)
- Oh, Many a Lover for voice and piano (1915); words by Alfred Noyes after Edmond Rostand
- Sweet and Low for voice and piano (1916)
- Three Songs for voice and piano (1917); words by Percy Bysshe Shelley and Alfred, Lord Tennyson

1. O Gentle Moon
2. There Is Sweet Music Here
3. O Happy Lark

- The Jane Vowles Songs, 93 Songs for voice and piano (or some with string quartet) (1927–1928)
  - Robin Goodfellow
  - Queen Djenira
  - The Bride Cometh
  - Lake Isle of Innisfree
  - Love Was True to Me
  - The Kiss
- O Peter Go Ring Dem Bells for voice and piano (1928)
- Deep River for voice and piano (1928)
- Green Willow for voice and piano (1928?)
- Cam' Ye By for 2 voices and piano (1929)
- Joseph and Mary for voice and piano (1929)
- Were I the Wind for voice and piano (1953); words by Welburn
- I'll Tell You of a Fellow for voice and 2 violins

Choral

- Hear my Prayer (1910?)
- Psalm 1 (1910)
- There Is Sweet Music Here (1911?); words from The Lotos-Eaters by Alfred, Lord Tennyson
- Magnificat and Nunc Dimittis for chorus and organ (1911)
- Three Partsongs (1911)

1. Fain Would I Change That Note; anonymous words
2. Take, O Take Those Lips Away; words by William Shakespeare
3. Music, When Soft Voices Die; words by Percy Bysshe Shelley

- Song of Darkness and Light for chorus and orchestra (1921)
- Come unto Me (1930)
- Six Anthems for chorus and organ (1930)
- Out of the Deep for chorus and organ (1930)
- Lord, unto us be Merciful (1932?)
- When all the Attic Fire was Fled (1932)
- Three Anthems (1933)
- Five Psalms for chorus and organ (1934–1936)
- Let my prayer come before Thee (1935)
- The Day draws on for chorus and organ (1936)
- Hear my Prayer (1936?)
- Three Hymns of Praise and Thanksgiving for chorus and organ (1937)
- Three Anthems for chorus and organ (1938)
- Music for the Communion Service (1939)
- Blessed be He
- Three in One and One in Three for chorus and organ
- Victoria Road, Hymn Tune
- Responses for Morning Service
- Two Anthems
- God that Madest Earth and Heaven for chorus and organ (1946)
- In This World (1948); words by Robert Herrick

== See also ==
- English Art Song
- Music engraving
