= Moisès Bertran =

Spanish composer

Moisès Bertran i Ventejo, in Spanish Moisés Bertrán (born Mataró, 1967) is a Catalan composer. He studied his Masters at the Hartt School of Music.

== Selected works ==
Bertran's scores are largely published by Clivis Publicacions, Editorial de Música Boileau, Tritó Distribucions and La Mà de Guido
Stage

- El último día de Francisco Pizarro, Opera (2006–2009)

Orchestral

- Introspecció for string orchestra (1990)
- Rondó (1992)
- Catalanesca (1994)
- Hartford, Fantasia for string orchestra (1999)
- Petita Simfonia for string orchestra (1998)
- Tres Momentos en Antioquia (2002)
- Variaciones Sinfónicas sobre un tema de Henry Eccles (Symphonic Variations on a Theme of Henry Eccles) (2005)

Concertante

- Concerto for piano and orchestra (2000)
- Esguards Silents for guitar and string orchestra (2003)
- Concertino for piano and string orchestra (2006)
- A Double Bass Fantasy, Fantasia for double bass and wind orchestra (2010)
- Concerto for violin and orchestra (2012–2013)

Chamber music

- Absència for violin and piano (1990)
- Piano Trio (1995)
- Sonatine pour Mykeko for flute and piano (1997)
- Quartet Ciutat Vella for flute, violin, viola and cello (1998)
- Trio for oboe, bassoon and piano (1998)
- Homenatge a J.S. Bach for violin and piano (2000)
- Suite for Wind Quintet (2000)
- Variacions i Fantasia sobre un tema de Salvador Pueyo for guitar and piano (2000)
- Suite para Elisza for clarinet and piano (2002)
- Sketch for 2 percussionists (2002)
- Miniatures per Gaudí for flute and guitar (2002)
- Adiós en Lima (Farwell in Lima), Prelude for double bass and piano (2004, 2010); original version for piano solo
- Perpetuum for double bass (2004)
- Preludio para Lima for guitar (2004)
- Sonatina líquida for flute, viola and harp (2006)
- Rapsodia for saxophone and piano (2011)
- Camins de vidre for violin and harp (or guitar, or piano) (2012)
- Secretos Compartidos, Suite in 5 movements for violin and viola (2012)

Piano

- Tema amb variacions (1988)
- Cinc petites peces (5 Small Pieces) (2000)
- A la memòria de Frederic Mompou (To the Memory of Federico Mompou) for piano 4-hands (2002)
- Blusing for Marcel (2004)
- Adiós en Lima (Farwell in Lima), Prelude (2004); also for double bass and piano
- Homenajes, Suite in 8 Movements and Epilogue for 22 pianos (2006)
- Sis Preludis (6 Preludes) (2011)
- Comiat a Elliot (Elliot's Farewell), Preludes (2012)
