= List of compositions for viola: L to N =

This article lists compositions written for the viola. The list includes works in which the viola is a featured instrument: viola solo, viola and piano, viola and orchestra, ensemble of violas, etc. Catalogue number, date of composition and publisher (for copyrighted works) are also included. Ordering is by composer surname.

This pages lists composers whose surname falls into the L to N alphabetic range. For others, see respective pages:

- List of compositions for viola: A to B
- List of compositions for viola: C to E
- List of compositions for viola: F to H
- List of compositions for viola: I to K
- List of compositions for viola: O to R
- List of compositions for viola: S
- List of compositions for viola: T to Z

== L ==
- Marcel Labey (1875–1968)

Sonata in C major for viola and piano, Op. 7 (1904); Éditions Max Eschig

- Joseph Labitzky (1802–1881)

L'adieu: Romance sans paroles in B♭ major for viola and piano, Op. 286 (1872)

- Osvaldo Lacerda (1927–2011)

Appassionato, cantilena e toccata for viola and piano (1977); Universidade de São Paulo; Academia Brasileira de Música
Choro seresteiro e fuga for clarinet and viola (1998); Academia Brasileira de Música
Fuga e postlúdio for violin and viola (1999); Academia Brasileira de Música
Sonata for viola and piano (1962)

- Piotr Lachert (1938–2018)

Katanick for viola and harpsichord (1986); CeBeDeM
Sonata No. 4 for viola and piano (1991); CeBeDeM

- Ignaz Lachner (1807–1895)

Trio No. 1 in B♭ major for violin, viola and piano, Op. 37 (1851)
Trio No. 2 in G major for violin, viola and piano, Op. 45 (1856)
Trio No. 3 in D major for violin, viola and piano, Op. 58 (1868)
Trio No. 4 in D minor for violin, viola and piano, Op. 89 (1879)
Trio No. 5 in E♭ major for violin, viola and piano, Op. 102 (1893)
Trio No. 6 in C major for violin, viola and piano, Op. 103 (1893)

- Paul Lacombe (1837–1927)

Morceau de fantaisie (Fantasy Piece) in D major for viola and piano, Op. 133 (1909)

- Ezra Laderman (1924–2015)

Concerto for viola and chamber orchestra (1977); G. Schirmer
Concerto for viola and orchestra (2001, 2007); G. Schirmer
Elegy for viola solo (1973); G. Schirmer
Fantasy for viola solo (1985); G. Schirmer

- Yehoshua Lakner (1924–2003)

Improvisation for viola solo (1952); Israeli Music Publications
Einwürfe for viola solo (1984)

- Marvin Lamb (b. 1946)

Fantasy for viola and piano (2011)
Grappelli Dreams for alto saxophone and viola (2008); Carl Fischer
House of Dawn for 4 violas (or viola ensemble) (2008)

- Ricard Lamote de Grignon (1899–1962)

Scherzino for viola and piano (1943); Clivis Publicacions

- John La Montaine (1920–2013)

Conversations for viola and piano, Op. 42 (1977); Fredonia Press

- Serge Lancen (1922–2005)

Lied (Song) for viola and piano (1970); Lido Mélodies; Éditions Alphonse Leduc; United Music Publishers
Si j'étais – (If I Were –) for cello or viola or bassoon and piano (1981); Lido Mélodies; United Music Publishers

- Jeanne Landry (1922–2011)

Trois poèmes (3 Poems) for viola and piano (1999); Doberman-Yppan

- Samuel de Lange (1840–1911)

Adagio for viola and organ, Op. 59 (1892); J. Rieter-Biedermann; Amadeus Verlag
Concerto for viola and orchestra (1900)
Geistliches Lied (Sacred Song) for soprano, viola and organ (1899)
Sonata No. 1 in A minor for viola and piano (1886, 1893)
Sonata No. 2 in A major for viola and piano (1911)

- Vanessa Lann (b. 1968)

In the Circumference of My Solitude for viola and double bass (scordatura) (1993); Donemus

- Pierre Lantier (1910–1998)

Diptyque for viola and piano (1971); Chappell Music; United Music Publishers
Sonata for viola and piano (1991); Editions Combre; United Music Publishers

- Raoul Laparra (1876–1943)

Suite ancienne en marge de Don Quichotte for violin or viola and piano (1921); Heugel

- Thomas Larcher (b. 1963)

Still for viola and chamber orchestra (2002, revised 2004); Schott Music

- Libby Larsen (b. 1950)

Bid Call for alto saxophone (or viola) and cello (2003); Oxford University Press
Black Birds, Red Hills, a Portrait of Six Paintings of Georgia O'Keeffe for clarinet, viola and piano (2005); Oxford University Press
Black Roller for solo viola, flute, oboe, clarinet, bassoon, violin, cello and piano (1981); ECS Publishing
In Such a Night for 2 violas and recorded voice (2010); text from The Merchant of Venice by William Shakespeare
Sifting through the Ruins for mezzo-soprano, viola and piano (2005)
Sonata for viola and piano (2001); Oxford University Press
Trio in Four Movements for flute, viola and harp (2005)

- Lars-Erik Larsson (1908–1986)

Concertino for viola and string orchestra, Op. 45 No. 9 (1956); Carl Gehrmans Musikförlag; Boosey & Hawkes

- Eduard Lassen (1830–1904)

Die Waldbrüder for voice, viola obbligato and piano, No. 4 from Fünf Lieder, Op. 46 (1874); words by Theodor Storm; Julius Hainauer; G. Schirmer

- Philip Lasser (b. 1963)

Sonata for viola solo (1986); Éditions Max Eschig
Vocalise for violin (or viola, or cello) and string quartet (2003)

- Faustas Latėnas (1956–2020)

Lipsi for viola and piano (1988)
Pasodoblis (Pasodoble) for viola and piano or string orchestra (1988); Lithuanian Music Information and Publishing Centre
Rondo Sonata for viola and piano (2018); Lithuanian Music Information and Publishing Centre

- Ferdinand Laub (1832–1875)

Trois Morceaux (3 Pieces) for viola and piano, Op. 14 (published 1883)

- Anne Lauber (b. 1943)

Concerto for string quartet and orchestra (1983); Canadian Music Centre
Mouvement for viola and piano (1980); Canadian Music Centre
Quatre pensées (Four Thoughts) for viola solo (1990); Canadian Music Centre

- Anna-Lena Laurin (b. 1962)

Danse joyeux de la ville blanche for viola and piano (2012)

- Elodie Lauten (1950–2014)

Prophecy for viola solo (1999)

- Mario Lavista (1943–2021)

Cuaderno de Viaje for viola solo (1989); Ediciones Mexicanas de Musica; Peer Music Classical

- Marc Lavry (1903–1967)

Concerto for viola and orchestra, Op. 247 (1953); The Marc Lavry Heritage Society
Suite concertante for flute, viola and harp, Op. 348 (1966)

- Henri Lazarof (1932–2013)

Anida, Duo Concertante for violin and viola (1998); Theodore Presser Company
Cadence II for viola and tape (1969); Bote and Bock
Concerto for viola and orchestra; Theodore Presser Company
Five Poems for viola solo (2004); Merion Music; Theodore Presser Company
Harp Trio "The Litomar" for flute, viola and harp (2004); Merion Music; Theodore Presser Company
Inventions for viola and piano (1962); Theodore Presser Company
Six Bagatelles for solo viola (1996); Theodore Presser Company
Rhapsody for viola and orchestra (1997); Theodore Presser Company
Ricercar for viola, piano and orchestra (1968); Associated Music Publishers
Volo (Tre Canti da Requiem) for viola and 2 string ensembles (1975); Theodore Presser Company

- Ramón Lazkano (b. 1968)

Chant II for viola and tape, or viola solo and 4 violas (1989); Éditions Le Chant du Monde
Hizpide for alto flute, viola and guitar (1995); Éditions Le Chant du Monde

- Victor Lazzarini (b. 1969)

Duas Danças (2 Dances) for viola and piano (1987–1988); Contemporary Music Centre Ireland

- Luise Adolpha Le Beau (1850–1927)

Drei Stücke (3 Pieces) for viola and piano, Op. 26 (1881)

- Lojze Lebič (b. 1934)

Meditacije za dva (Meditations for Two) for viola and cello (1965, revised 1972); Edicije Društva Slovenskih Skladateljev
Rubato per viola for viola solo (1989); Edicije Društva Slovenskih Skladateljev

- Fernand Le Borne (1862–1929)

Rêverie for viola and piano (or orchestra), Op. 55 (1910)

- Jean-Marie Leclair (1697–1764)

6 Sonatas for 2 violas, Op. 12 (1749); Edition Schott

- Brent Lee (b. 1964)

I Wait for You in the Gathering Light for viola solo (2001); Canadian Music Centre
More Fog for viola and percussion (1993); Canadian Music Centre

- Sebastian Lee (1805–1887)

Sept pièces mélodiques d'une difficulté modérée d'après les études mélodiques for cello or violin or viola and piano (1884)
Sous le balcon: Sérénade sur le Barbier de Séville de Rossini for cello or viola and piano, Op. 75 (1856)

- Stephen Leek (b. 1959)

Goombungee for viola (or violin, or cello) and piano (1989); Australian Music Centre

- Nicola LeFanu (b. 1947)

Songs for Jane for soprano and viola (2005); Maecenas Music; Edition Peters

- Charles-Édouard Lefebvre (1843–1917)

Cantabile for viola d'amore or viola and piano, Op. 82 (1892)
Caprice in A minor for viola and orchestra or piano, Op. 106b (1898, 1900)

- Victor Legley (1915–1994)

Ballade No. 2 for viola and piano, Op. 86 No. 2 (1975); CeBeDeM
Caractères (Characters) for viola and guitar, Op. 106 (1985); CeBeDeM
Elegisch Lied (English Song) for viola and piano, Op. 7 (1944); CeBeDeM
Poème du printemps (Poem of Spring) for viola and piano, Op. 51 No. 2 (1958); CeBeDeM
Sonata for viola and piano, Op. 13 (1943); CeBeDeM
Vier Miniaturen (4 Miniatures) for viola solo, Op. 118 No. 1 (1991); CeBeDeM
Concerto for viola and orchestra, Op. 78 (1971); CeBeDeM

- Hans Ulrich Lehmann (1937–2013)

Contradictions, Concertino for viola and chamber orchestra (2008); Edition Gamma
Duo for viola and double bass (2009); Edition Gamma
Magica for mezzo-soprano, flute and viola (2006); words by Donata Berra
Structures transparentes for clarinet, viola and piano (1960)
Studien (Studies) for viola solo (1966); Ars Viva Verlag; Edition Schott
viola in all moods and senses for viola solo (2003); Edition Gravis
Without Words (Ohne Worte), 7 Songs for viola and piano (2010–2011); Edition Gamma

- René Leibowitz (1913–1972)

Concertino for viola and chamber orchestra, Op. 35 (1954); Mobart Music
Sonatina for flute, viola and harp, Op. 69 (1966); Mobart Music

- Hugo Leichtentritt (1874–1951)

Sonata for viola and piano, Op. 13 (c.1910)

- Walter Leigh (1905–1942)

Sonatina for viola and piano (1930); Comus Edition

- Kenneth Leighton (1929–1988)

Concerto for viola and harp with string orchestra and timpani, Op. 15 (1952); Novello & Co.
Fantasia on the Name BACH for viola and piano, Op. 29 (1955); Novello & Co.

- Ernst Ludwig Leitner (b. 1943)

Chansons for viola and string orchestra (1993); Verlag Doblinger

- Édith Lejet (b. 1941)

Almost a Song for viola and guitar (1995); Éditions Max Eschig

- Vlastimil Lejsek (1927–2010)

Dvě skladby (2 Pieces) for viola and piano (1959)

- Aubert Lemeland (1932–2010)

Duo Variations for viola and guitar, Op. 77 (1982); Éditions Gérard Billaudot
Sonata for viola solo, Op. 7 (1966); Éditions Jean Jobert

- Kamilló Lendvay (1928–2016)

24 Duos for 2 violins or violin and viola (1985); Ayqu Music, Budapest; Editio Musica Budapest
Tanulmány (Study) for viola solo (1995); Ayqu Music, Budapest; Editio Musica Budapest

- Jacques Lenot (b. 1945)

De la mélancolie for viola solo (1987); Éditions Salabert
Échappée for viola and piano (1982); Éditions Salabert
Esquif for viola and piano (2002); L'Oiseau Prophète
Frammento per l'armonia della notte for viola and harp (1975); Éditions Salabert
Il meraviglioso, anzi (Titre de Alberto Arbasino) for viola solo (2005); L'Oiseau Prophète
Parmi les hiérarchies des anges for viola and organ soli and orchestra (1985); Éditions Salabert
Trois pièces for viola and piano (1995)
Utopia glossa seconda for viola solo (1982); Éditions Salabert

- James Lentini (b. 1958)

Big City Stomp for viola, baritone sax, and bayan (2006)
El Signo del Angel for viola and harp (2004)
Scenes from Sedona for viola and cello (1996); European American Music

- Georges Lentz (b. 1965)

Monh from Mysterium (Caeli enarrant... VII) for solo viola, orchestra and electronics (2001–2005); Universal Edition

- Tania León (b. 1943)

Hebras d' Luz (Threads of Light) for electric viola (2004)
Para Viola y Orquesta for viola and orchestra (1994); Southern Music Publishing; Peer Music Classical

- Fred Lerdahl (b. 1943)

Imitations (6 Études) for flute, viola and harp (1979); Mobart Music

- Terje Bjørn Lerstad (b. 1955)

6 Etyder for Bratsj-band (6 Etudes for Viola Band) for 6 violas, Op. 201b (1994); Music Information Centre Norway
Fantasi (Fantasy) for viola solo, Op. 15 (1983); Music Information Centre Norway

- Jonathan Leshnoff (b. 1973)

Double Concerto for violin, viola and orchestra (2007); Leshnoff Publishing
Three Minute Chaconne for viola solo (2011); also for violin or cello solo; Leshnoff Publishing

- John Lessard (1920–2003)

Concert duo for viola and guitar (1981); American Composers Alliance
Four Pieces for viola and percussion (1985?); American Composers Alliance
Movements for Trumpet and Various Instruments II for trumpet and viola (1978); American Composers Alliance

- Harold Levin (b. 1956)

Five Pieces for clarinet, viola and trumpet (2001); Jomar Press
Rhapsodie for viola and piano (1975)
Two Haiku Songs for soprano, viola and piano (1998); Jomar Press

- Zara Levina (1906–1976)

Poema (Поема) for viola and piano (1928); Muzsektor gosizdata; Universal Edition

- Michaël Lévinas (b. 1949)

Arcades for viola and piano (1982); Éditions Salabert; Éditions Henry Lemoine
Arcades II for viola and 12 instruments (1982); Éditions Henry Lemoine
Les Lettres enlacées II: Fragments d'une lettre for viola solo (2000); Éditions Henry Lemoine
Les Lettres enlacées V for 2 violas (2006); Éditions Henry Lemoine

- Yuri Levitin (1912–1993)

Variations for violin (or viola) solo, Op. 45 (c.1956); Sovetsky Kompozitor

- Ernst Levy (1895–1981)

Sonata for viola and piano (1979)
Suite for 2 violas (1963)
Suite [No. 1] for viola or cello solo (1956)
Suite No. 2 for viola solo (1971)
Trio for clarinet, viola and piano (1968); Seesaw Music
Threnodie for viola, cello and organ (1975)

- Frank Lewin (1925–2008)

Concerto Armonico for viola and orchestra (1960); revision of Concerto for Harmonica and Orchestra by Brett Deubner (2006); Notevole Music Publishing
Concerto on Silesian Tunes for viola and orchestra (1965); Notevole Music Publishing; American Composers Alliance

- Ulrich Leyendecker (1946–2018)

Concerto for viola and orchestra (2007–2008); Hans Sikorski
Etüde for viola solo (1989)
Sonata for flute, viola and harp (1988); Hans Sikorski
Trio for viola, bass clarinet and piano (1966, revised 2001); Hans Sikorski

- Fran Lhotka (1883–1962)

Sljepačka for viola and piano (1960); Muzička Naklada, Zagreb

- Lei Liang (b. 1972)

Feng for viola solo (1998); original for cello solo; Schott Music
Gobi Canticle for violin and viola (2005); original for violin and cello; Schott Music; Project Schott New York
Lakescape III for 2 violas, or viola solo (2014); Schott Music

- Andreas Lidel (c.1740–c.1789)

6 Duos for violin and viola, Op. 3 (c.1780); Amadeus Verlag; Bärenreiter Verlag

- Ingvar Lidholm (1921–2017)

Invention for viola and cello (1954); STIM; Swedish Music Information Centre

- José Lidón (1748–1827)

Sonata in D minor for viola and basso continuo (1806); Editorial de Música Boileau

- Lowell Liebermann (b. 1961)

Sonata for viola and piano, Op. 13 (1984); Theodore Presser Company
Two Pieces for violin and viola, Op. 4 (1978); Theodore Presser Company

- Peter Lieberson (1946–2011)

Concerto for viola and orchestra (1992); G. Schirmer
Rhapsody for viola and orchestra (1994); G. Schirmer
Rumble for viola, double bass and percussion (1994); G. Schirmer

- Max Lifchitz (b. 1948)

Yellow Ribbons No. 22 (Lamento) for viola and piano (1982)

- György Ligeti (1923–2006)

Sonata for viola solo (1991–1994); Edition Schott

- Douglas Lilburn (1915–2001)

Canzonetta No. 1 for violin and viola (1942); Centre for New Zealand Music
Canzonetta No. 2 for violin and viola (1943); Centre for New Zealand Music
Canzonetta No. 3 for violin and viola (1958); Centre for New Zealand Music
Piece for Solo Viola for viola solo; Centre for New Zealand Music
Suite for viola solo (1954, revised 1955); SOUNZ, Centre for New Zealand Music
Three Songs for baritone and viola (1958); SOUNZ, Centre for New Zealand Music

- Liza Lim (b. 1966)

Amulet for viola solo (1992); G. Ricordi London; Australian Music Centre

- Norbert Linke (1933–2020)

Elegie und Tanz (Elegy and Dance) for viola solo (1992); Verlag Neue Musik

- Malcolm Lipkin (1932–2017)

Pierrot Dances for viola and piano (1998)
Trio for flute, viola and harp (1982)

- Marijan Lipovšek (1910–1995)

Dva dua (Two Duos) for violin and viola (1959); Društvo Slovenskih Skladateljev

- David Liptak (b. 1949)

Concerto for viola and percussion (2005); Lauren Keiser Music Publishing
Duo for viola and piano (1996); MMB Music; Lauren Keiser Music Publishing
Melissa's Quilt for viola and marimba (1999); MMB Music; Lauren Keiser Music Publishing
The Play of Winds for viola solo (2000); MMB Music; Lauren Keiser Music Publishing
Pulse Music for mezzo-soprano, flute and viola (1984); American Composers Alliance
Serenade for alto saxophone or viola and string orchestra (2001)
Trio for viola, percussion and piano (2007); Lauren Keiser Music Publishing

- Franz Liszt (1811–1886)

Liebestraum, Notturno No. 3 in A♭ major for viola and piano, S. 541 (c.1850); original for piano; transcription by Lionel Tertis; Comus Edition
Romance oubliée for viola and piano, S. 132 (1880)

- Lino Liviabella (1902–1964)

Quattro brani nuziali (4 Wedding Songs) for viola and organ or harmonium (1961)
S. Francesco, Meditazione for viola, 2 violins, double bass and organ (1926)
Sette duetti miniatura (7 Miniature Duets) for violin and viola (1957)
Sonata No. 1 "in One Movement" (Prima Sonata in un tempo) for viola and piano (1950); original manuscript
Sonata No. 2 for viola and piano (1957)
Tre momenti (3 Moments) for viola and piano (1956)
Tre preghiere per la sera (Three Evening Prayers) for voice, viola and piano (1958); words by Lucio Liviabella

- Charles Harford Lloyd (1849–1919)

Duo Concertante for violin (or viola, or clarinet) and piano (1888); Novello
Suite in the Old Style for clarinet (or viola) and piano (1914); Boosey & Hawkes

- Jonathan Lloyd (b. 1948)

Between Us a River, before Us the Sea for violin or viola and CD (2002)
Concerto for viola and small orchestra (1979–1980); Boosey & Hawkes
Like Fallen Angels for flute, viola and harp (1986); Boosey & Hawkes

- William Lloyd Webber (1914–1982)

Sonatina for viola and piano (1951); Stainer & Bell

- Vasily Lobanov (b. 1947)

Concerto No. 1 for viola and string orchestra, Op. 53 (1989); Hans Sikorski
Concerto No. 2 for viola and string orchestra, Op. 71 (1998)
Kleine Suite im alten Stil (Little Suite in Old Style) for viola solo, Op. 63 (1992)
Sonata for viola and piano, Op. 58 (1990); Hans Sikorski
4 Stücke im strengen Stil (4 Pieces in a Strict Style) for clarinet or viola and piano, Op. 43 (1984); Hans Sikorski

- Dan Locklair (b. 1949)

Dream Steps, Dance Suite for flute, viola and harp (1993); Subito Music

- David Loeb (b. 1939)

Brugsegezichten (Faces of Bruges) for flute and viola
Duo Concertante for viola and cello (1984); Accentuate Music
Elegy for viola and double bass (1977); Accentuate Music
Entr'actes for 2 violins and viola
Fantasia for 2 violas (1984)
Fantasia Concertante for viola and string orchestra (1985)
Fantasia on a Tibetan Minstrel Song "Tasar Lung Gi Shokpa" for viola solo (1980); Harold Branch Publishing; Accentuate Music
Four Songs from "Leaves of Grass" for baritone and viola (1984); words by Walt Whitman; Accentuate Music
3 Litanies for violin and viola
Lyric Pieces for viola solo; Accentuate Music
Madrigaletti for oboe and viola
Nocturnes and Arias for violin and viola
Of Mountains and Rivers without End for solo viola
Preludes for Several Millennia for viola solo
Rhapsodic Miniatures for viola solo
Snowscapes for viola and percussion (1996)
Sonata for flute, viola and harp (1988)
Sonata No. 1 for viola solo
Sonata No. 2 for viola solo
Sonata No. 3 for viola solo (1963)
Sonata No. 4 for viola solo (published 1984); Accentuate Music
Sonata No. 5 for viola solo
Sonata No. 6 for viola solo
Sonata No. 1 for viola and cello
Sonata No. 2 for viola and cello (1979)
Sonata No. 1 for viola and piano; Harold Branch Publishing
Sonata No. 2 for viola and piano (1975)
Sonata No. 1 for violin and viola (1960)
Sonata No. 2 for violin and viola
Sonata No. 3 for violin and viola (1979); Harold Branch Publishing
Sonata No. 4 for violin and viola
Sonata No. 5 for violin and viola (1981)
Sonata No. 6 for violin and viola
Suite for clarinet and viola
Suite [No. 1] for viola solo (1980); Accentuate Music
Suite No. 2 for viola solo (1980)
Suite No. 3 for viola solo (1987)
Three Fantasias for 2 violas (1975)
Three Fantasias for violin and viola (1985)
Trois cansos for flute, viola and guitar (1984)
Two Intermezzi for viola solo; Harold Branch Publishing

- Charles Martin Loeffler (1861–1935)

Quatre Poèmes for medium voice, viola and piano, Op. 5; McGinnis & Marx
Deux Rhapsodies for oboe, viola and piano

- Theo Loevendie (b. 1930)

Sonata Coloniae for viola solo (1999); PeerMusic Classical

- Fred Lohse (1908–1987)

Sonata for viola and piano (1953); Editions Metropolis

- Luca Lombardi (b. 1945)

Bab for viola solo (2003); Rai Trade
Concerto for viola and orchestra (1995); Ricordi Milano
Geburtstagsgruß für Thomas und Bernhard for violin and viola (2003)
Rnnili for viola solo (1995); Ricordi Milano

- Ruth Lomon (1930–2017)

5 Songs after Poems by William Blake for alto and viola (1962); Arsis Press

- Alessandro Longo (1864–1945)

Suite for viola and piano, Op. 53 (1911); G. Ricordi; Prairie Dawg Press

- Paolo Longo (b. 1967)

Ammonizione for mezzo-soprano, viola, vibraphone
E già sono deserto – "Quasi un notturno" for viola and 5 instruments (2005)

- Georges Lonque (1900–1967)

Images d'orient for viola and piano, Op. 20 (1930); Éditions Alphonse Leduc; CeBeDeM

- Fernando Lopes-Graça (1906–1994)

Concertino for viola and orchestra, LG 72
Quatro peças em suite (Suite of Four Pieces) for viola and piano, LG 102 (1978)

- Carlos López Buchardo (1881–1948)

Dos piezas (2 Pieces) for viola and piano (1928); G. Ricordi

- Bernardo Lorenziti (1764–1813)

3 Sonatas for viola and basso (cello), Op. 39 (1800)

- Ivana Loudová (1941–2017)

Notturno for viola and string orchestra (1975); Český Hudební Fond

- Alexina Louie (b. 1949)

Winter Music, Chamber Concerto for viola and 11 instruments (1989); Canadian Music Centre

- Alain Louvier (b. 1945)

Concerto for viola and orchestra (1996); Editions Combre
Envols d'écailles for flute, viola and harp (1987); Éditions Alphonse Leduc
Sempre più alto for viola and piano (1981); Éditions Alphonse Leduc; United Music Publishers

- William Lovelock (1899–1986)

Concerto for viola and orchestra (1960)

- David Ludwig (b. 1974)

Flowers in the Desert for clarinet, viola and piano (2009)

- Raymond Luedeke (b. 1944)

Brief Encounters for viola and piano (1996); American Composers Alliance; Canadian Music Centre
My Secret Life for viola solo (1983); American Composers Alliance; Canadian Music Centre
Silence! for suitcase percussion and viola (1986); Canadian Music Centre
Sonata for viola and piano (1975); American Composers Alliance; Canadian Music Centre

- Otto Luening (1900–1996)

Duo for flute and viola (1985); American Composers Alliance
Duo for violin and viola, W194 (1976); Joshua Corporation; G. Schirmer
Eight Tone Poems for 2 violas, W223 (1972); Joshua Corporation; G. Schirmer
Fantasia for viola solo (1994); American Composers Alliance
Sonata for viola solo (1958); Highgate Press
Suite for viola and piano, W136 (1972); Highgate Press

- Enid Luff (1935–2022)

Viola Lullaby for viola solo (1996); Primavera; Welsh Music Information Centre

- Pál Lukács (1919–1981)

Fekvésváltó gyakorlatok mélyhegedűre, felső fokon (Exercises in Change of Position for Viola, Advanced Grade) (1959); Editio Musica Budapest; Zeneműkiado vállalat

- Zdeněk Lukáš (1928–2007)

Cantabile for viola and harpsichord, Op. 216 (1988)
Canto appassionato for viola and piano, Op. 308 (1999)
Concerto for viola and orchestra, Op. 185 (1983); Český Hudební Fond
Concerto for violin, viola and orchestra, Op. 58 (1968); Panton Praha; Český Hudební Fond
Divertimento for violin and viola, Op. 96 (1973); Arco Diva; Český Hudební Fond
Dolore ed amore for 4 violas, Op. 347
Hosprenglic, Duo for viola and harp, Op. 328 (2002); Český Hudební Fond
Hudba k vernisáži for viola and piano, Op. 68 (1970); Český Hudební Fond
Lode al canto for men's chorus, viola solo and orchestra, Op. 94 (1973); Český Hudební Fond
Meditace (Meditation) for viola and harpsichord, Op. 116 (1975); Český Hudební Fond
Meditace – Rondo (Meditation – Rondo) for viola and harpsichord, Op. 128 (1977); Český Hudební Fond
Rotlevův šlojíř, Trio for violin, viola and piano, Op. 354 (2007)
Sonata for viola solo, Op. 243 (1991); Arco Diva; Artesmon; Český Hudební Fond
Supplemento for viola and harpsichord, Op. 334

- John Lunn (b. 1956)

Music for viola and piano; Scottish Music Centre

- Roberto Lupi (1908–1971)

Varianti for viola and piano

- Witold Lutosławski (1913–1994)

Bukoliki (Bucolics) for viola and cello (1952, arranged 1962); Polskie Wydawnictwo Muzyczne

- Elisabeth Lutyens (1906–1983)

Echo of the Wind for viola solo, Op. 157 (1981); University of York Music Press
Kareniana for viola and chamber ensemble, Op. 99 (1974); University of York Music Press
The Singing Birds for speaker and viola, Op. 151 (1980); University of York Music Press
Sonata for viola solo, Op. 5 No. 4 (1938); Alfred Lengnick
Concerto for viola and orchestra, Op. 15 (1947); Alfred Lengnick

- Anatoly Lyadov (1855–1914)

Prelude, Op. 11 No. 1; original from 3 Morceaux, Op. 11 (1886) for piano; 1950 transcription by Vadim Borisovsky
Prelude in F major, Op. 57 No. 1; original for piano; transcription by Yevgeny Strakhov; Declaration of Love: Album of Popular Pieces for Viola and Piano (Страстное Признание: Альбом Популярных Пьес), Muzyka

- Sergei Lyapunov (1859–1924)

Gifts of the Terek (Дары Терека), Cantata for viola solo, chorus and orchestra (1883)

- Borys Lyatoshynsky (1895–1968)

2 Pieces: Nocturne and Scherzino (Дві п'єси: Нюктюрн і Скерцино) for viola and piano, Op. 65 (1963); Mistetstvo, Kiev

- Michel Lysight (b. 1958)

Chronographie VIII for viola (or cello) and piano (2004); Alain Van Kerckhoven Éditeur; CeBeDeM
Homage to Fibonacci for 2 violas (2004); Éditions Delatour; CeBeDeM
Meditation for viola and guitar (or harp, or harpsichord, or marimba, or piano) (2009); Alain Van Kerckhoven Éditeur
Samarkand for viola (or clarinet) and piano (or string quartet) (1992, 1995); Alain Van Kerckhoven Éditeur
Septentrion for viola (or clarinet) and piano, or string quartet, or string orchestra (2005); Éditions Delatour; CeBeDeM
Thrène for viola (or violin, or cello) and piano (1995); Alain Van Kerckhoven Éditeur
Trois Croquis for viola (or violin, or cello) and piano (1990); Alain Van Kerckhoven Éditeur

== M ==
- Ami Maayani (1936–2019)

Concerto for viola and orchestra (1974); Israeli Music Publications
Improvisation variée for flute, viola and harp (1966)
Trio for flute, viola and harp (1969); revision of Improvisation variée; Lyra Music

- Andrew Paul MacDonald (b. 1958)

The Great Square of Pegasus: "Algenib" for viola solo, Op. 42 (1997)
Hymenaeus for violin and viola, Op. 38 (1996); Canadian Music Centre
Pleiades Variations for flute, viola and harp, Op. 45 (1998); Canadian Music Centre
Tapestries for viola and string orchestra, Op. 66 (2004)

- Otmar Mácha (1922–2006)

Balada for viola and piano (1988); Český Hudební Fond
Balada a finále (Ballade and Finale) for viola, piano and string orchestra (2000–2001); Český Hudební Fond

- Peter Machajdík (b. 1961)

Behind the Waves for viola and string orchestra (2016)
Munk for viola and piano (2013)
Peroket for viola solo (1997, revised 2012)
Halleluya for viola and soprano (2018)

- Tod Machover (b. 1953)

Song of Penance for hyperviola, computer voice, and 17 instruments (1992)

- Steven Mackey (b. 1956)

Groundswell (also Ground Swell), Concerto for viola and chamber ensemble (2007); Boosey & Hawkes

- James MacMillan (b. 1959)

Concerto for viola and orchestra (2013); Boosey & Hawkes
So Deep for mixed chorus with optional oboe and viola solos (1992); words by Robert Burns; Boosey & Hawkes

- Elizabeth Maconchy (1907–1994)

Concerto for viola and orchestra (1937); Alfred Lengnick
Conversations for clarinet and viola (1967–1968)
3 Easy Duets for 2 violas (1972); Faber Music; G. Schirmer
3 Easy Pieces for violin and viola (1972); Faber Music; G. Schirmer
4 Easy Trios for 2 violins and viola or violin and 2 violas (1972); Faber Music
5 Pieces for viola solo (1937)
Romanza for viola and chamber ensemble (1979); Chester Music
5 Sketches for viola solo (1983); Chester Music
Sonata for viola and piano (1937–1938)

- Stuart MacRae (b. 1976)

Equilibrium for viola and ensemble (flute, clarinet, violin, cello, piano) (2008); Novello & Co.
fenodyree for viola solo (2015)
The City Inside for viola and piano (1997); Novello & Co.

- Bruno Maderna (1920–1973)

Viola for viola solo (1971); Ricordi
Ständchen für Tini (Serenade for Tini) for viola and violin (1972); Edizioni Suvini Zerboni

- Trygve Madsen (b. 1940)

Sonata for viola and piano, Op. 33 (1960s, published 1987); Musikk-Husets Forlag

- Jan Maegaard (1926–2012)

Elegia, Nocturne for viola and string orchestra, Op. 108 (1999)
Labirinto I for viola solo, Op. 77 (1986); Engstrøm & Sødring
Quasi una sonata for viola and piano, Op. 14 (1952)

- Jef Maes (1905–1996)

Andante rustique for viola and piano (1934); CeBeDeM
Concerto for viola and orchestra (1937, 1943); CeBeDeM
Divertimento for viola and piano (1966); CeBeDeM
Intermezzo for viola and piano (1935); CeBeDeM
Sonatine for flute and viola (1934); CeBeDeM
Trio for violin, viola and percussion (1964); CeBeDeM

- Quinto Maganini (1897–1974)

An Ancient Greek Melody for viola and piano (1945); Edition Musicus
Concert Album: 14 Works arranged for viola and piano (1954); Edition Musicus
Night Piece for viola and piano (1946); Edition Musicus
Song of a Chinese Fisherman for viola and piano (1944); Edition Musicus

- Mary Mageau (1934–2020)

Contrasts in Continuum for unaccompanied viola (1968); Australian Music Centre
Preludes for Patricia, 4 Short Pieces for 2 violas or solo viola with prerecorded tape (1996); Australian Music Centre
Statement and Variations for viola solo (1979); University of Michigan; Australian Music Centre

- Ester Mägi (1922–2021)

Serenaad (Serenade) for flute, violin and viola (1982); Eres Edition

- Frederik Magle (b. 1977)

Lament for viola and organ (2017)

- Ernst Mahle (b. 1929)

As melodias da Cecília (The Songs of Cecília) for viola and piano (1972); Irmãos Vitale
Concertino for viola and string orchestra (1978)
Duetos modais (Modal Duets) for 2 violas (1991)
Sonata for viola and piano (1968)
Sonatina for viola and piano (1976)
Sonatina for viola or cello and piano (1956)

- Claus-Steffen Mahnkopf (b. 1962)

memor sum for viola solo (1989); Bärenreiter Verlag
Trio basso for viola, cello and double bass (1995); Hans Sikorski

- Mesías Maiguashca (b. 1938)

Plainte: "...unvermindert weiter..." ("...con la misma intensidad...") for accordion and viola (1993); Edition Modern; Tre Media Musikverlage

- René Maillard (1931–2012)

Sonata No. 1 for viola and piano, Op. 5 (1952, revised 2009); Éditions Delatour
Sonata No. 2 for viola and piano, Op. 18 (2003); Éditions Delatour

- Teisutis Makačinas (b. 1938)

Dvi poemos (Two Poems) for flute, viola and string orchestra (1962); Muzyka
Tango "Krintanti žvaigždė" (Tango "Falling Star") for viola and piano (2004) or for 8 violas, double bass, piano and percussion (2005); Lithuanian Music Information and Publishing Centre

- Andreas Makris (1930–2005)

Concerto for viola and orchestra (1970)

- Maciej Małecki (b. 1940)

Andante i allegro (Andante and Allegro) for viola and string quintet (or string orchestra) (2005)

- Gian Francesco Malipiero (1882–1973)

Canto nell'infinito for viola and piano (1930); original for violin and piano; Éditions Alphonse Leduc
Dialogo No. 5 "Quasi Concerto" for viola and orchestra (1956); Ricordi

- Riccardo Malipiero (1914–2003)

Canti (Songs) for viola and orchestra (1978); Edizioni Suvini Zerboni
Ciaccona di Davide for viola and piano (1970); Edizioni Suvini Zerboni

- Ursula Mamlok (1923–2016)

From My Garden for viola solo (1965); C.F. Peters
Music for Viola and Harp (1965); American Composers Alliance

- Özkan Manav (b. 1967)

Partita for viola solo, Op. 4 (1991–1992, revised 2003)

- Joe Maneri (1927–2009)

Osanj for viola solo (2004)

- Philip Maneval (b. 1956)

Sonata for viola and piano, Op. 16
Sonata for violin and viola, Op. 25 (2009); Theodore Presser Company

- Robert Mann (1920–2018)

Invocation for violin and viola (1997); Merion Music; Theodore Presser Company

- Daan Manneke (b. 1939)

Archipel II for viola, cello and double bass (1985); Donemus
Quasi una fantasia a tre for flute, viola and harp (2004)

- Franco Mannino (1924–2005)

Suoni Astrali (Astral Sounds) for 8 violas, Op. 245 (1985); Edipan Musical Editions
Cinque romanze (Five Romances) for viola and orchestra, Op. 116 (1975); version for viola and string orchestra, Op. 116b (1999); Edizioni Curci
Piccola Sonata (Little Sonata) for viola and piano, Op. 44 (1966); Casa Musicale Sonzagno
Sonata for viola solo, Op. 64 (1970); Edizioni Curci
Three Pieces for Viola (1983); Boccaccini & Spada

1. Anxiety, Op. 234
2. Tumult, Op. 235
3. Peace, Op. 236

Tre pezzi (Three Pieces) for viola solo (1990); Edizioni Curci

1. Immagine, Op. 362
2. Visione (sogno o realtà?), Op. 363
3. Felicità, Op. 364

- Jeff Manookian (1953–2021)

Diversions for violin and viola (2021); Windsor Editions
Improvisations on Armenian Folk Songs for viola and orchestra (1999); Windsor Editions
Lamentum for viola and piano (2019); Windsor Editions
Nox for solo viola, harp and string orchestra (2014); Windsor Editions
Sonata for viola and piano (2014); Windsor Editions

- Philippe Manoury (b. 1952)

Partita I for viola and live electronics (2006)

- Tigran Mansurian (b. 1939)

3 Arias for viola and large orchestra (2008)
Concerto "...and then I was in time again..." for viola and 18 strings (1995); M.P. Belaïeff
Confessing with Faith for 4 male voices and viola (1998)
4 Hayrens for viola and piano (1967, 2007, revised 2010); original for mezzo-soprano and piano; M.P. Belaïeff
Lacrymae for soprano saxophone and viola (1999); M.P. Belaïeff
Lamento for viola solo (2002); M.P. Belaïeff
Lied und Gebilde for viola and percussion (1998, revised 2000 and 2010); M.P. Belaïeff
Ode an den Lotus (Ode to the Lotus) for viola solo (2012); commissioned work for the 2013 ARD International Music Competition; M.P. Belaïeff
Sonata for viola and piano (1962); Muzyka; Hans Sikorski

- Bruno Mantovani (b. 1974)

Concerto for 2 violas and orchestra (2009); Éditions Henry Lemoine
Da Roma for clarinet, viola and piano (2005); Éditions Henri Lemoine
Little Italy for viola solo (2005); Éditions Henri Lemoine
Quelques effervescences for viola and piano (2006); Éditions Henri Lemoine
Une autre incandescence for clarinet, viola and piano (1998); Éditions Henri Lemoine

- Giacomo Manzoni (b. 1932)

Improvvisazione for viola and piano (1958); G. Ricordi

- Marin Marais (1656–1728)

Chaconne for viola d'amore or viola and piano (1686); original for viola da gamba and basso continuo; transcription by Louis van Waefelghem (1893?)
Sarabande for viola d'amore or viola and piano (1686); original for viola da gamba and basso continuo; transcription by Louis van Waefelghem (1893?)

- Myriam Marbe (1931–1997)

Concerto for viola and orchestra (1977); Editura Muzicală
Paos for viola and clarinet (1995)
Sonata for viola and piano (1955)
Sonata (Prologo – Aria – Epilogo) for 2 violas (1966); Editura Muzicală; Breitkopf & Härtel
Sonata per due for flute and viola (1985)
Souvenir d'un paysage inconnu for flute and viola (1979)

- Erich Marckhl (1902–1980)

Musik (Music) for viola and piano (1941)
Sonata for viola solo (1948)
Sonata for viola and piano (1939)

- Tomás Marco (b. 1942)

Dúo concertante No. 4 for viola and piano (1980)
Trio concertante No. 2 for flute, violin and viola (1984)

- Henri Maréchal (1842–1924)

Élégie for viola and piano (published 1931); Éditions Maurice Senart

- Tera de Marez Oyens (1932–1996)

Möbius by Ear for viola and piano (1982); Donemus

- Alain Margoni (b. 1934)

3 Eaux-fortes (3 Etchings) for viola and piano (1982); Éditions Gérard Billaudot; United Music Publishers

- Pierrette Mari (b. 1929)

Ciel de bruyère (Sky of Heather) for viola and piano (1981); Éditions Gérard Billaudot; United Music Publishers

- Pierre Mariétan (b. 1935)

Caractères for flute, viola and double bass (1961)
Chamber Music No. 4: Traces, bribes et autres fragments for violin and viola (1981)
Ersatz for viola solo (1961)
Passages I–III for viola and cello (1961)

- Liviu Marinescu (b. 1970)

Quodlibet Sonata for cello or viola solo (1996)

- Alexandros Markeas (b. 1965)

5 Souvenirs involontaires (5 Involuntary Memories) for viola and cello (2004); Éditions Gérard Billaudot
Télégraphiques for viola solo (2000)

- Albert Markov (b. 1933)

Elegy for viola and piano (1994)

- Günther Marks (1897–1978)

Jesu, meine Freude, Partita for viola and organ (1970); Hänssler-Verlag
Mein schönste Zier und Kleinod bist, Partita for viola and organ (1977); Hänssler-Verlag

- Miklós Maros (b. 1943)

An Arty-and-crafty Lilt for alto, viola (or cello) and piano (1976); Swedish Music Information Centre
Claris for clarinet, viola and piano (1994); Swedish Music Information Centre
Confabulation for flute, viola and guitar (1997); Swedish Music Information Centre
Diptychon for viola and organ (1979); Svensk Musik; Swedish Music Information Centre
Glädjebud (Good Tidings) for trumpet, violin and viola (1971); Swedish Music Information Centre
Konzertmusik (Concert Music) for violin, viola and chamber ensemble (1992); Swedish Music Information Centre
Partite for viola and piano (1991); Svensk Musik; Swedish Music Information Centre
Violasonata for viola and live electronics (1970); Swedish Music Information Centre

- Wolfgang Marschner (1926–2020)

Concerto for viola and string orchestra (premiere 2004)
Deutsche Epigramme for 2 violas
Nocturne for violin and viola
Rhapsodie for viola solo

- Pamela J. Marshall (b. 1954)

Rising for viola solo (2009); Spindrift Music

- Henri Marteau (1874–1934)

Chaconne in C minor for viola and piano, Op. 8 (1905)
Feuillet d'Album (Album Leaf) in D minor for viola and piano, Op. 2 No. 2
Partita for flute and viola, Op. 42 No. 2
Fünf Schilflieder for baritone, viola and piano, Op. 31; words by Nikolaus Lenau

- Carlo Martelli (b. 1935)

Terzetto for 2 violins and viola, Op. 11 (1960); Alfred Lengnick

- Henri Martelli (1895–1980)

Concertstück (Concert Piece) for viola and piano, Op. 97 (1961); Éditions Ricordi
Sonata for viola and piano, Op. 93 (1959); Éditions Choudens

- Frank Martin (1890–1974)

Ballade for viola, winds, harp, harpsichord, timpani and percussion (1972); Universal Edition

- Jorge Martín (b. 1959)

Three Nocturnes for cello (or violin, or viola, or clarinet) and piano (1997)

- Philip Martin (b. 1947)

Aria and Moto Perpetuo for viola and piano (1992); Ireland Contemporary Music Centre
Fantasy "Footfalls Echo in the Memory" for flute, viola and harp (2008); Ireland Contemporary Music Centre

- Jean Paul Égide Martini (1741–1816)

Plaisir d'Amour (1780); transcription for viola d'amore or viola and piano by Louis van Waefelghem

- Donald Martino (1931–2005)

Three Dances for viola and piano, Op. 23 (1954); Dantalian
Three Sad Songs for viola and piano (1993); Dantalian

- Jean Martinon (1910–1976)

Concerto for viola and orchestra (1930s); Néocopie Musicale
Rapsodie 72 for viola and piano, Op. 60 (1972); Éditions Gérard Billaudot

- Rolf Martinsson (b. 1956)

Den hemliga liljan (The Secret Lily) for mezzo-soprano, viola and piano (1990); STIM; Swedish Music Information Centre
Rosen for mezzo-soprano and viola (1995); STIM; Swedish Music Information Centre
Tics for flute, viola and guitar, Op. 43 (1997); STIM; Swedish Music Information Centre
Trio for clarinet, viola and piano (1986)

- Bohuslav Martinů (1890–1959)

Concerto for string quartet and orchestra, H. 207 (1931); Panton; Schott Music
Divertimento (Serenade No. 4) for violin, viola and chamber orchestra, H. 215 (1932)
Duo No. 2 for violin and viola, H. 331 (1950); Éditions Max Eschig
Ptačí hody (The Bird Feast) for children's chorus and trumpet (or viola), H. 379 (1959); Panton; Schott Music
Rhapsódie-koncert (Rhapsody-Concerto) for viola and orchestra, H. 337 (1952); Bärenreiter-Verlag
Sonata No. 1 for viola and piano, H. 355 (1955); Associated Music Publishers
Tři madrigaly (Three Madrigals) [Duo No. 1] for violin and viola, H. 313 (1947); Boosey & Hawkes

- Karl Marx (1897–1985)

Concerto for viola and orchestra, Op. 10 (1930?); Bote & Bock

- David Maslanka (1943–2017)

Montana Music: Fantasy on a Chorale Tune for violin and viola (1993)
Trio No. 2 for viola, clarinet and piano (1973); C. Fischer

- Benedict Mason (b. 1954)

Concerto for the Viola Section, accompanied by the rest of the orchestra (1990); Chester Music

- Daniel Gregory Mason (1873–1953)

Pastorale in D major for violin, clarinet (or viola) and piano, Op. 8 (1909–1912); Éditions Salabert

- Gérard Masson (b. 1936)

Alto-tambour for violin, viola and 12 strings (1985)
Duo for 2 violas; United Music Publishers
Duo for violin and viola (1982)
Mélisande 1 mètre 60 de désespoir for viola and piano (1990)
W3A6M4 for violin, viola and chamber orchestra (1983); Éditions Salabert

- Piotr Maszyński (1855–1934)

Romans (Romance) in A major for violin or viola and piano, Op. 10

- Martín Matalon (b. 1958)

Formas de Arena for flute, viola and harp (2001); Gérard Billaudot
Traces II for viola solo and live electronics (2005); Gérard Billaudot
Trame VI for viola and chamber orchestra (2003); Gérard Billaudot

- Bruce Mather (b. 1939)

Barbaresco for viola, cello and double bass (1984); Canadian Music Centre
Dialogue pour Trio Basso et Orchestre for viola, cello, double bass and orchestra (1988); Canadian Music Centre
Gattinara for viola and percussion (1982); Canadian Music Centre
Viola Duet for 2 violas (1987); Canadian Music Centre

- William Mathias (1934–1992)

Divertimento for violin and viola, Op. 1 (1954, revised 1992); Oxford University Press
Zodiac Trio for flute, viola and harp, Op. 70 (1975); Oxford University Press

- Janez Matičič (1926–2022)

Deux poèmes (2 Poems) for viola and piano (1949); Društvo Slovenskih Skladateljev

- Wenzeslaus Matiegka (1773–1830)

Grand Trio for violin, viola and guitar, Op. 9
Grand Trio for violin, viola and guitar, Op. 24
Notturno in G major for flute, viola and guitar, Op. 21
Serenade in C major for flute, viola and guitar, Op. 26

- Colin Matthews (b. 1946)

3 Interludes for clarinet, viola and piano (1994); Faber Music
4 Moods for viola and piano (1999, 2006); Faber Music
1. Luminoso (2006)
2. Oscuro (1999)
3. Scorrevole (2006)
4. Calmo (1999)

- David Matthews (b. 1943)

Chant for solo viola (1997); Visible Music
Danny's Dance for violin and viola (1989)
Darkness Draws In for solo viola, Op. 102 (2005); Faber Music
Double Concerto for violin, viola and orchestra, Op. 122 (2013); Faber Music
Not Farewell for solo viola (2003); Visible Music
Fantasia for solo viola, Op. 5 No. 1 (1970); Visible Music
Winter Journey for solo viola, Op. 32a (1982–1983, 1999); Faber Music
Winter Remembered for viola and string orchestra, Op. 86 (2001); Faber Music.

- Michael Matthews (b. 1950)

and the sky caught for clarinet (bass clarinet), viola and piano (2012)
3 Duos (Book I) for violin and viola (2005)
Four Songs of Japan for soprano, viola and fortepiano (1991)
Wondering for viola solo (2001); Canadian Music Centre

- Siegfried Matthus (1934–2021)

Trio for flute, viola and harp (1971); Breitkopf & Härtel; Deutscher Verlag für Musik
Unruhige Zeit, Trio for baryton, viola and cello (1990); Breitkopf & Härtel; Deutscher Verlag für Musik
Wasserspiele for clarinet, viola and piano (2001); Breitkopf & Härtel; Deutscher Verlag für Musik

- Ludwig Wilhelm Maurer (1789–1878)

Divertimento for viola and string orchestra, Op. 85 (1861)

- William Mayer (1925–2017)

Twists for oboe and viola (2008); WillMayer Music

- Jacques Féréol Mazas (1782–1849)

3 Duets for 2 violas, Op. 71; original for 2 violins; adaptation by Louis Pagels; International Music
Élégie en ut (Elegy in C) for viola or cello and piano, Op. 73 (1838)
La Consolation, Élégie No. 2 in G major for viola and orchestra (or piano), Op. 29 (1831)
Le Songe (The Dream), Fantaisie on a Theme from Gaetano Donizetti's La favorite for viola or viola d'amore and piano, Op. 92 (c.1853)

- Jules Mazellier (1879–1959)

Nocturne et Rondeau for viola and piano (1934); Éditions Costallat; Éditions Gerard Billaudot

- Rytis Mažulis (b. 1961)

Canon perpetuus for 3 violas (2001); Lithuanian Music Information and Publishing Centre
Dragma for 2 viola and piano (1995); Lithuanian Music Information and Publishing Centre

- John McCabe (1939–2015)

Chamber Concerto for viola, cello and orchestra (1965); Novello
Concerto Funèbre for viola and chamber orchestra (1962, revised 2006); Novello
February Sonatina for viola solo (1990); Novello
Musica Notturna for violin, viola and piano (1964); Novello

- Daniel William McCarthy (b. 1955)

Chamber Suite for viola and chamber ensemble (2005); C. Alan Publications
Testament for viola and piano (2003); C. Alan Publications

- Cecilia McDowall (b. 1951)

Not Just a Place "dark memories from an old tango hall" for viola, double bass and piano (1999); McTier Music
Upstaged for violin and viola (1998); Gemini Publications

- John Blackwood McEwen (1868–1948)

Breath o' June for viola and piano (1913)
Concerto for viola and orchestra (1901); Scottish Music Information Centre
5 Preludes and a Fugue for violin and viola (1939, 1942); original version for 2 violins
Sonata in A minor for viola and piano (1941); Scottish Music Information Centre

- Mike McFerron (b. 1970)

Music for Viola and Piano (1996–1997); Red Earth Publishing

- Edward McGuire (b. 1948)

Concerto for viola and string orchestra (1998); British Music Information Centre
Divertimento for 20 solo violas (1979); British Music Information Centre
Fastpeace III for viola and guitar (1982); British Music Information Centre
Legend for viola and tape (1978); Scotus Music Publications; British Music Information Centre
Martyr for viola solo (1972); Scottish Music Publishing
Movement for flute, viola and harp (1979); British Music Information Centre
Prelude 6 for viola solo (1981); British Music Information Centre
Seven Modal Duets for viola and cello (1966, 1975); Scotus Music Publications; British Music Information Centre
5 Songs for mezzo-soprano, viola and piano (1982); Scottish Music Centre
Sounds Around for viola and percussion (1976, 1984); Scotus Music Publications; British Music Information Centre
Three Dialogues for viola and double bass (1987); British Music Information Centre

- Diana McIntosh (b. 1937)

Gut Reaction for viola and tape (1986); Canadian Music Centre
Nanuk: Inuit for White Bear for viola and piano (1991); Canadian Music Centre

- George Frederick McKay (1899–1970)

Ballade for viola
Suite for viola and piano (1948); G. F. McKay Music Publishing
Tlingit: Suite on Alaskan Indian Songs and Dances for viola and piano; original for violin and piano; McGinnis and Mark Music Publishers; Pietro Diero Publications

- Elliott Miles McKinley (b. 1969)

A Few (Very) Late Hours for viola and electric piano (2005)
Solo-Tude for viola solo (2005)
Sonata for viola and piano (1991)

- William Thomas McKinley (1938–2015)

Ancient Memories, Chamber Concerto for viola and chamber ensemble (1989)
Concerto No. 1 for viola and orchestra (1984)
Concerto No. 2 for viola and orchestra
Concerto No. 3 for viola and orchestra (1992); MMC Publications
Concerto Fantasy for viola and orchestra (1978)
Concert Variations for violin, viola and orchestra (1993)
Little Sonata for viola, clarinet and piano (1973)
Portraits for viola solo (1973)
Samba for viola and piano (1984)
Sonata No. 1 for viola and piano (1984)
Trio for 2 violins and viola (1971)
Trio Appassionato for clarinet, viola and piano (1982)
Waves, Study for viola solo (1973)

- John McLeod (1934–2022)

Canto Per Tre for mezzo-soprano, viola and piano (1972); Scottish Music Centre
2 Carols for mezzo-soprano, viola and piano (1975)

- Lansing McLoskey (b. 1964)

Wild Bells for viola and piano (1999); Odhecaton Z Music

- Gordon McPherson (b. 1965)

Haar for solo viola, string orchestra, harp and percussion (1986–1987); Oxford University Press

- Cindy McTee (b. 1953)

Circle Music I for viola and piano (1988); MMB Music; Lauren Keiser Music Publishing

- Tilo Medek (1940–2006)

Sonata for viola and piano (1981); Moeck Verlag
Variationen ohne Thema (Variations without Theme) for violin and viola (or cello) (2001–2002); Edition Tilo Medek

- Paul Méfano (1937–2020)

Instantanée for viola solo (2005); Éditions Musicales Européennes

- André Mehmari (b. 1977)

Sonata in C (Sonata em Dó) for viola and piano (2015)

- Jost Meier (1939–2022)

Variations for viola and chamber orchestra (1996); Editions Bim

- Chiel Meijering (b. 1954)

Ahnung des Endes for viola, chorus and orchestra (1985); Donemus
Amber and Cream for viola and accordion (2007)
Another Day Dies on a Gull's Cry for viola and guitar Trio (1989); Donemus
Bumelen Gehen for viola and accordion (2007)
Do You Want Me to Turn Your Floppy? for viola and harp (2006); Donemus
Dreamtime – No Rhyme No Reason, Part 3 for viola, guitar trio and tape (1987); Donemus
Handgeld for oboe (or flute), viola and guitar (1987, revised 1991); Donemus
Little Box of Serenity for flute, guitar and viola (1997); Donemus
Niet in de zon en droog bewaren for viola, double bass and accordion (1990); Donemus
Nini for viola and guitar (1986, revised 1987); Donemus
Pithycanthropus erectus for viola and piano (1994); Donemus
Ready to Go Again! for viola, double bass and accordion (1991); Donemus
Romantic Aberration for viola and harp (2006); Donemus
The Swing of the Thing for viola, double bass and accordion (1990); Donemus
Two Can Play for violin and viola (2003); Donemus
Variation on a Variation by Franz Liszt on a Waltz Tune of Anton Diabelli for violin and viola (2003); Donemus
Violaconcerto (Ahnung des Endes, Part 3) for viola, chorus and orchestra (1985); Donemus
Winds of Change – No Rhyme No Reason, Part 2 for viola and guitar trio (1987); Donemus

- John Melby (b. 1941)

Concerto No. 1 for viola and computer (1982); Merion Music; American Composers Alliance
Concerto No. 2 for viola and computer (2009); American Composers Alliance

- Wilfrid Mellers (1914–2008)

Sonata for viola and piano (1946); Alfred Lengnick
Songs of Sleep, Three Lullabies for tenor voice, viola and piano; Frog Peak Music

- Jacques de Menasce (1905–1960)

Sonate en un mouvement for viola and piano (1955); Éditions Durand; Elkan-Vogel

- Alfred Mendelssohn (1910–1966)

Concerto for viola and orchestra (1965); Uniunea, Bucharest
Petite Suite for viola solo (1933); Uniunea, Bucharest

- Felix Mendelssohn (1809–1847)

Canon in E♭ major for 2 violas, MWV Y 7 (1831); American Viola Society Publications
Sonata in C minor for viola and piano, MWV Q 14 (1823–1824)
Trio in C minor for violin, viola and piano, MWV Q 3 (1820)

- Gilberto Mendes (1922–2016)

Per sonar a tre for 2 violins and viola (1978); Editora Universidade de Brasília

- Max Méreaux (b. 1946)

Bella Donna for viola solo (2010); Éditions Armiane Fortin
Dualitude for viola and piano (2006); Éditions Pierre Lafitan
Heureux présage (Good Omen) for viola and piano (2003); Éditions Pierre Lafitan
Idylle for viola solo (2004); Editions Combre; United Music Publishers
Ikebana for viola and orchestra (2017); Éditions Fertile Plaine
Invocation for viola and piano (2002); Editions Combre; United Music Publishers
Le vieux château (The Old Castle) for viola and piano (2003); Éditions Pierre Lafitan
Préludes à trois légendes (Preludes to Three Legends) for viola solo (2006); Éditions Delatour France
Remember for viola and piano (2005); Éditions Pierre Lafitan
Rêverie for viola and piano (2005); Éditions Musicales Auguste Zurfluh

- Usko Meriläinen (1930–2004)

Trauerlied for viola solo (1962); Finnish Music Information Centre

- Pavle Merkù (1927–2014)

Alba, Monologue for viola solo (1986); Pizzicato-Verlag Helvetia

- Michel Merlet (b. 1939)

Ostinato for viola and piano, Op. 37 (1986); Collection Panorama: Œuvres Contemporaines, Volume 2 (1987); Éditions Gérard Billaudot

- Frank Merrick (1886–1981)

Sonata for viola and piano; British Music Information Centre

- Arthur Meulemans (1884–1966)

Concerto for viola and orchestra (1942); CeBeDeM
Sonata for flute, viola and harp (1948); CeBeDeM
Sonata for viola and piano (1953); CeBeDeM

- Ernst Hermann Meyer (1905–1988)

Concerto for viola and orchestra (1978); Edition Peters
Essay for viola solo (1983); Edition Peters
Poem for viola and orchestra (1961); Breitkopf & Härtel
Sonata for viola and piano (1979); Edition Peters

- Krzysztof Meyer (b. 1943)

Hommage à Nadia Boulanger for flute, viola and harp, Op. 17 (1967–1971, revised 1991); Wydawnictwo Muzyczne Agencji Autorskiej

- Max Meyer-Olbersleben (1850–1927)

Concerto in D major for viola and orchestra, Op. 112
Elegiac Sonata for viola, cello and piano, Op. 113
Sonata in C major for viola (viola alta) and piano, Op. 14 (1881)

- Carlos Micháns (b. 1950)

Rapsodía for viola solo (1983); Donemus
Sinfonia Concertante No. 4 for violin, viola and orchestra (2002); Donemus
Sonata for viola solo (1993); Donemus
Trois étoffes anciennes (3 Old Fabrics) for viola and piano (2003); Donemus

- Paul-Baudouin Michel (1930–2020)

Mystère-jeu for viola and piano (1976); CeBeDeM

- Michel Michelet – Михаил Исаакович Левин (1894–1995)

Eisenbach suite for violin and cello (or viola) (1950)
Poem for viola and piano (1951)
Sonata for viola and piano (1959)

- Peter Mieg (1906–1990)

Doris for viola solo (1977); Musik Verlag Nepomuk
Duo for flute and viola (1977); Amadeus Verlag

- Costin Miereanu (b. 1943)

Solo VII for viola solo (1995); Éditions Salabert

- Francisco Mignone (1897–1986)

Três Valsas Brasileiras (3 Brazilian Waltzes) for viola and piano (1968)

- Georges Migot (1891–1976)

Au bord de l'Eure, 5 Aquarelles for violin, viola and piano (1917); Édition Maurice Senart
Estampie for viola and piano (1925); Alphonse Leduc
Introduction for viola and piano (1928)
Sonata for viola solo (1958); Amis de l'œuvre et de la pensée de Georges Migot; SEDIM
Suite à deux for English horn (or clarinet, or viola) and cello (1963); Amis de l'œuvre et de la pensée de Georges Migot; SEDIM
Suite en trois mouvements for 2 recorders or violin and viola (1957); Bärenreiter-Verlag
Trio for violin, viola and piano (1918); Alphonse Leduc; Éditions Maurice Senart

- Marcel Mihalovici (1898–1985)

Sonata for viola and piano, Op. 47 (1948); Heugel
Sonata for viola solo, Op. 110 (1980); Éditions Salabert
Textes for viola and piano, Op. 104 (1975); Heugel

- András Mihály (1917–1993)

Brácsa-rapszódia (Viola Rhapsody) for viola and piano (1947); Magyar Kórus Budapest; Editio Musica Budapest
Musica per Viola for viola with piano accompaniment (1975); Editio Musica Budapest

- Yvar Mikhashoff (1941–1993)

Concerto for viola and orchestra (1968, revised 1976)

- Louis-Toussaint Milandre (18th century)

Andante et Menuet (1770); arrangement for viola d'amore or viola and piano by Louis van Waefelghem

- Ella Milch-Sheriff (b. 1954)

Duo for violin and viola (1976); Israel Music Institute
Longing (געגועים) for viola solo (2005)
4 Miniatures (ארבע מיניאטורות) for viola solo and 2 violas (2005); Israel Music Institute
Touches (נגיעות) for violin and viola (2007)

- Miroslav Miletić (1925–2018)

À Naruhito & Masako: Uspavanka (Komoriuta / 子守唄 / Lullaby) for viola and piano (2001); M. Miletić, Zagreb
Concerto for viola and chamber orchestra (1958); M. Miletić, Zagreb
Concerto Grosso iz ciklusa "Lijepa naša" (Concerto Grosso from the Cycle "Our Lovely Croatia") for viola and string orchestra (2005); Cantus Publishing
Duo for viola and cello (2010)
Epitaf za Pepina (Epitaph for Pepin; Epitaffio per Pepin) for viola and string orchestra (2008); M. Miletić, Zagreb
Fantazija na teme B. Brittena (Fantasia on Themes by Benjamin Britten) for viola and piano (1993); M. Miletić, Zagreb
Istarski način (In the Istrian Style), Trio for flute, clarinet and viola (1984); Društvo Skladatelja Hrvatske
Iz kajdanke A. Dobronića: prisjecánje na dječje zborove (From the Music Manuscript of Antun Dobronić: Reflections on Children's Choruses) for viola and piano (1997)
Kroateska (Croatesque) for viola solo (2001); M. Miletić, Zagreb
Lament for viola and electronic sounds (1963)
Male skladbe (Miniatures) for viola and piano; Z. Kolarić, Zagreb
Monodia for viola solo (1990); Bärenreiter
Monolog (Monologue) for viola and piano (1965); Edition Pax, Zagreb
Rapsodija (Rhapsodie) for viola and piano (1955); Edition Pax, Zagreb
Sonata for viola and piano (1981); Edition Pax, Zagreb

- Robin Milford (1903–1959)

Elegiac Meditation for viola and string orchestra, Op. 83 (1946–1947); Oxford University Press
Four Pieces for viola and piano, Op. 42 (1935)

Air; Oxford University Press

- Darius Milhaud (1892–1974)

Concertino d'été for viola and chamber orchestra, Op. 311 (1951); Heugel
Concerto [No. 1] for viola and orchestra of soloists, Op. 108 (1929); Universal Edition
Concerto No. 2 for viola and orchestra, Op. 240 (1954–1955); Heugel
Élégie pour Pierre for viola, timpani and 2 percussionists, Op. 416 (1965); Gems Music Publications
Quatre Visages for viola and piano, Op. 238 (1944); Heugel
1. La Californienne
2. The Wisconsonian
3. La Bruxelloise
4. La Parisienne
Sonata No. 1 for viola and piano, Op. 240 (1944); Heugel
Sonata No. 2 for viola and piano, Op. 244 (1944); Heugel
Sonatine for violin and viola, Op. 226 (1941); Mercury Music Corporation
Sonatine for viola and cello, Op. 378 (1959); Heugel
Suite for violin, viola and piano, Op. 157b (1936); Éditions Salabert

- Richard Mills (b. 1949)

Concerto for violin, viola and chamber orchestra (1993); Australian Music Centre

- Vlado Milošević (1901–1990)

Preludij i elegija (Prelude and Elegy) for viola solo (1970)
Sonata for viola and piano (1967); Udruzenje Kompozitora Bosne i Hercegovine

- İlhan Mimaroğlu (1926–2012)

Idols of Perversity for solo viola and string ensemble (1974); Seesaw Music
Monologlar (Monologue) for clarinet and viola (1997)

- Georgi Minchev (b. 1939)

Monodia and Concerto Grosso for viola, harpsichord, percussion and string orchestra (2006); Editions Bim
Monodia II for viola or cello solo (2006)

- Khayyam Mirzazade (1935–2018)

Genesis, Sonata for viola solo (1982); Sovetsky Kompozitor

- Marco Misciagna (b. 1984)

Three Flamenco Caprices for viola solo;
Introduction and Variations on 'Mer Hayrenik' (Armenian National Anthem) for viola solo;
Morricone Film Suite for viola solo (Suite in 8 movements, homage to Ennio Morricone);
Viola Blues for viola solo;
Six Jazz Viola Preludes for viola solo (1-Ragtime, 2-Cafè Concerto, 3-Ragtime Boogie, 4-Ballade, 5-J.S.Bach Joke, 6-Jazz Viola Prelude);
Jerusalem Fantasy for viola solo;
Samba for viola solo;
Star Wars Suite for viola solo (homage to John Williams);
Jazz Caprices for viola solo;
3 Pieces, Homage to Charlie Byrd for viola solo(1-Swing'59, 2-Blues for Felix, 3-Spanish Viola Blues);

- Eric Moe (b. 1954)

And Life Like Froth Doth Throb for viola and cello (1997); Dead Elf Music; Subito Music
Preamble & Dreamsong from the 4–5 a.m. REM Stage for alto flute or viola and piano (2003)

- Albert Moeschinger (1897–1985)

Introduzione e scherzo for 2 violins and viola (1933)
Portrait of Emmy, Trio for 2 violins and viola (1967); Müller & Schade

- Robert Moevs (1920–2007)

Variazioni sopra una melodia (Variations on a Melody) for viola and cello (1961); Piedmont Music

- Roderich Mojsisovics von Mojsvár (1877–1953)

Sonata in C minor for viola (or violin) and piano, Op. 74 (1927); Musikverlag Ludwig Krenn

- Roberto Molinelli (b. 1963)

Chanson antique for flute, viola and harp (1986)
Elegia per Manhattan (Elegy for Manhattan) for viola, cello and string orchestra (2001)
Milonga para Astor for viola, cello and string orchestra (1988)
Montessoriana, Cantata for soprano, narrator, viola, children's chorus and orchestra (2000); words by Paolo Peretti
Movie Concerto: Scene scritte in forma di colonna sonora, Divertissement-Concerto for viola and orchestra (1999)
Once upon a Memory for viola, piano, percussion and string orchestra (2007)
Tosca: "Tu a me una vita... io a te chieggo un istante!", Fantasia-Story on the opera Tosca by Giacomo Puccini for viola and string orchestra (1997)

- Francesco Molino (1768–1847)

3 Trios for flute, viola and guitar, Op. 4 (1812)
Grand Trio Concertant for flute (or violin), viola and guitar, Op. 30
Grand Trio Concertant for flute (or violin), viola and guitar, Op. 45

- Simon Molitor (1766–1848)

Trio for violin (or flute), viola and guitar, Op. 6 (1806)

- Carl Christian Møller (1823–1893)

Lykkelig for viola (or cello) and orchestra

- Henry Mollicone (1946–2022)

Chaunt for viola solo (1972); E.C. Schirmer Music
Two Love Songs for tenor and viola (1969); ECS Publishing; American Composers Alliance

- Fred Momotenko (b. 1970)

Eneato for viola (or violin) solo (2003)

- José Pablo Moncayo (1912–1958)

Sonata for viola and piano (1934); Ediciones Mexicanas de Música

- Barbara Monk Feldman (b. 1953)

Movement for solo viola (1979); Canadian Music Centre

- Marc Monnet (b. 1947)

Fantasia Bruta for viola solo (1982); Ricordi

- Stephen Montague (b. 1943)

Facing the Fire for violin and viola (2004); United Music Publishers

- Pierre Monteux (1875–1964)

Arabesque in D major for viola and piano (1920); Éditions Salabert
Mélodie for viola and piano; Éditions Salabert

- Xavier Montsalvatge (1912–2002)

Pregària a Santiago for viola and piano (1999); Tritó

- Ivan Moody (b. 1964)

Klama for viola and double bass (1996)
Vigil of the Angels for viola and string orchestra (1992)

- Dorothy Rudd Moore (1940–2022)

Moods for viola and cello (1969); American Composers Alliance

- Arie Van de Moortel (1918–1976)

Fantasia sopra la canzone "All voll" (Fantasy on the Song "All voll") for viola (or cello, or double bass) and orchestra (or piano), Op. 44 (1970); J. Maurer Edition Musicale; CeBeDeM
Faust et Don Juan for viola and piano, Op. 29 (1965); CeBeDeM
Loin des torches de Prague (Far from the Torches of Prague) for narrator, viola and piano, Op. 48 (1973); CeBeDeM
Nocturne for viola and orchestra (or piano), Op. 18 (1956); J. Maurer Edition Musicale; CeBeDeM
Sonata for viola and piano, Op. 14 (1955); J. Maurer Edition Musicale; CeBeDeM

- Guy Morançon (1927–2025)

Salicornes for viola and piano; Le Chant du Monde

- Oskar Morawetz (1917–2007)

Sonata for harp and viola (1985); Canadian Music Centre

- Norbert Moret (1921–1998)

Veni Sancte Spititus for viola and organ (1990); Edition Norbert Moret

- Saburō Moroi (1903–1977)

Sonata for viola and piano, Op. 11 (1935)

- Andrea Morricone (b. 1964)

Nello Sguardo for viola and string orchestra (2012)

- Ennio Morricone (1928–2020)

Il sogno di un uomo ridicolo for violin, viola (or 2 violas) and speaker (1997); Edizioni Suvini Zerboni
Ombra di lontana presenza for viola, string orchestra and tape (1997); Edizioni Suvini Zerboni
Scie for vibraphone, viola and tape
Suoni per Dino for viola and 2 magnetophones (1969); Éditions Salabert

- Robert Morris (b. 1943)

Entanglements for viola and computer-generated sounds (1998); Morris Music
The Rest Stop for viola solo (2001); Morris Music

- Virgilio Mortari (1902–1993)

Concerto dell'osservanza for viola and orchestra (1965); Ricordi
Meditazione for oboe, viola and harp (1992); Rugginenti

- Lodewijk Mortelmans (1868–1952)

Romanza for viola and piano (1935); original for violin and piano; CeBeDeM

- Finn Mortensen (1922–1983)

Sonatina for viola solo, Op. 14 (1958); Music Information Centre Norway
Sonatina for viola and piano, Op. 18 (1959); Music Information Centre Norway

- Luca Mosca (b. 1957)

Sinfonia Concertante for violin, viola and string orchestra, Op. 64 (1993); Edizioni Suvini Zerboni

- Alexander Mosolov (1900–1973)

3 Lyric Pieces (Три лирические пьесы) for viola and piano, Op. 2 (1922–1923); also published as 3 Esquisses
Sonata for viola solo, Op. 21a (c.1925)

- David Moule-Evans (1905–1988)

Moto Perpetuo for viola and piano (1938); Joseph Williams; Mills Music

- Wolfgang Amadeus Mozart (1756–1791)

Duo No. 1 in G major for violin and viola, K. 423 (1783)
Duo No. 2 in B♭ major for violin and viola, K. 424 (1783)
Sinfonia Concertante in E♭ major for violin, viola and orchestra, K. 364 (K. 320d) (1779)
"Kegelstatt" Trio in E♭ major for clarinet, viola and piano, K. 498 (1786)

- Marjan Mozetich (b. 1948)

Baroque Diversions for viola solo (1985); Jaymar Publications; Canadian Music Centre
Dancing Strings, Suite of 6 Pieces for viola and piano (1980, revised 2005); Canadian Music Centre
Disturbances for viola solo (1974); Canadian Music Centre
Goodbye My Friend, Triptych for flute, viola and harp (2000); Canadian Music Centre
Survival for viola solo (1979); Canadian Music Centre
Trio in Jest for clarinet, viola and piano (1983); Canadian Music Centre
A Veiled Dream for flute, viola and harp (1977); Canadian Music Centre
Water Music for flute, viola and cello (1979); Canadian Music Centre

- Geraldine Mucha (1917–2012)

Sonatina for viola (1945)

- Nico Muhly (b. 1981)

Concerto for viola and orchestra (2014); St. Rose Music Publishing
Drones and Viola for viola and piano (2011); St. Rose Music Publishing
Duet No 1: Chorale Pointing Downwards for viola and cello (2003); St. Rose Music Publishing
Keep in Touch for viola solo and electronics (2004); St. Rose Music Publishing
Three Etudes for Viola for viola and tape; St. Rose Music Publishing

- August Eberhard Müller (1767–1817)

Romance pathétique for viola and piano; transcription by Louis Pagels (1895); Louis Oertel

- Fabian Müller (b. 1964)

The Mysterious Mr. Harley Quin for violin, viola and piano (2011)
Sonata for viola and piano (2012)
Suite for viola and string orchestra (or piano) (2004)

- Thomas Müller (b. 1939)

Maqam for oboe (English horn) and viola (1987); Verlag Neue Musik

- Detlev Müller-Siemens (b. 1957)

Concerto for viola and orchestra (1983–1984); Ars Viva Verlag; Schott Musik International
distant traces for violin, viola and piano (2007); Schott Musik International
Doppelkonzert (Double Concerto) for violin, viola and orchestra (1992); Ars Viva Verlag; Schott Musik International

- Jan Müller-Wieland (b. 1966)

Himmelfahrt for viola solo (2003); Hans Sikorski

- Florentine Mulsant (b. 1962)

Sonata for viola and piano, Op. 20 (1999); Furore Verlag
Thème et variations (Theme and Variations) for viola solo, Op. 62 (2016); Furore Verlag
Vocalise for viola solo, Op. 53 (2014); Furore Verlag

- Jeffrey Mumford (b. 1955)

the clarity of remembered springs for solo viola (1992–1993); Theodore Presser Company
eight aspects of appreciation for violin and viola (1996, revised 2000); Theodore Presser Company
revisiting variazioni elegiaci for solo viola (2001); Theodore Presser Company
wending for solo viola (2001); Theodore Presser Company

- Gerhart Münch (1907–1988)

Tacambarenses III for viola and piano (1961); Ediciones Coral Moreliana, Morelia, Mexico
Tessellata Tacambarensia No. 8 (Emanationes Tacambarenses) for English horn, viola and vibraphone (1974); Ediciones Coral Moreliana, Morelia, Mexico

- Isabel Mundry (b. 1963)

Vent contraire for 2 violas (1999); Breitkopf & Härtel

- Tristan Murail (b. 1947)

C'est un jardin secret, ma sœur, ma fiancée, une fontaine close, une source scellée... for viola solo (1976); Éditions Musicales Transatlantiques
La Dérive des continents for viola and string orchestra (1973); Éditions Henry Lemoine
Où tremblent les contours for 2 violas (1970); Rideau Rouge; Éditions Henry Lemoine

- Herbert Murrill (1909–1952)

Four French Nursery Songs (Jeux de nourrices) for viola and piano (1942); Chester Music

- Thea Musgrave (b. 1928)

Concerto for viola and orchestra (1973); Novello & Co.
Elegy for viola and cello (1970); Novello & Co.
From One to Another I for viola and tape (1970); Novello & Co.
From One to Another II for viola and string orchestra (1970); Novello & Co.
In the Still of the Night for viola solo (1997); Novello & Co.
Lamenting with Ariadne for chamber orchestra (with viola solo) (1999); Novello & Co.

- Modest Mussorgsky (1839–1881)

Hopak (Гопак) from the opera The Fair at Sorochyntsi (1874–1880); 1944 transcription for viola and piano by Vadim Borisovsky; Declaration of Love: Album of Popular Pieces for Viola and Piano (Страстное Признание: Альбом Популярных Пьес), Muzyka

- Emanuele Muzio (1821–1890)

Andante e Rondoletto for viola and piano (1858)

== N ==
- Šarūnas Nakas (b. 1962)

Arcanum for viola and organ (1987) or viola with flute, violin, cello and synthesizer (1996); Lithuanian Music Information and Publishing Centre

- Émile Naoumoff (b. 1962)

Petite suite for viola and piano (1984); Edition Schott
Sonata for viola and piano (2001, revised 2009); Edition Schott

- Jacopo Napoli (1911–1994)

Ricercare for viola solo; Edizioni Curci

- Onutė Narbutaitė (b. 1956)

Aštuonstygė (The Eight-String) for violin and viola (1986); Lithuanian Music Information and Publishing Centre

- Masakazu Natsuda (b. 1968)

Lonc tans me sui tenu de chanter, mes... (長いこと私は歌わずにやってきた、しかし...) for alto flute and viola (2008)
2 Pièces (2つの小品) for horn and viola (2008)

- Jérôme Naulais (b. 1951)

À l'aube... for viola and piano; Éditions Robert Martin
La-Mi calmant for viola and piano; Éditions Robert Martin
Sur le ton de la confidence for viola and piano (2004); Éditions Robert Martin
Un rayon de lumière for viola and piano (2004); Éditions Pierre Lafitan

- Ernst Naumann (1832–1910)

Drei Fantasie-Stücke (3 Fantasy Pieces) for cello (or viola) and piano, Op. 4 (1861)
Drei Fantasie-Stücke (3 Fantasy Pieces) for viola and piano, Op. 5 (1861)
Sonata in G minor for viola and piano, Op. 1 (1854)
Trio in F minor for violin, viola and piano, Op. 7 (1863)

- Lior Navok (b. 1971)

Dripping Minutes - Frozen Years, for viola and piano (2017)

- Oskar Nedbal (1874–1930)

Romantisches Stück (Romantic Piece) for viola and piano, Op. 18 (1910); original for cello and piano, arrangement by the composer; Verlag Doblinger

- Marc Neikrug (b. 1946)

Concerto for viola and orchestra (1974); Chester Music

- Václav Nelhýbel (1919–1996)

Concerto for viola and orchestra (1981); Barta Music
Counterpoint No. 3 for viola and double bass (1979); Barta Music; Ludwig Music Publishing
Variations on a Slovak Folk Song for 2 violas (1974); E.C. Kerby; Alliance Publications

- Daniel Nelson (b. 1965)

Romantatronic for solo viola, string orchestra, celesta and percussion (2000); Swedish Music Information Centre

- Octavian Nemescu (1940–2020)

Cumpana porţii (Le chadouf de la porte) for viola (or double bass), percussion and tape (1976)
Metabizantinirikon for viola and tape (1984)
A T for saxophones, viola and tape (2008)

- Jon Øivind Ness (b. 1968)

Gust for viola and double bass (2006); Music Information Centre Norway
Snowblind for viola and chamber orchestra (2008); Music Information Centre Norway

- Josef Nešvera (1842–1914)

Lipnická "ukolébavka" for viola (or violin) and piano (published 1907); Adolf Švarc v Kutné Hoře

- Franz Christoph Neubauer (c.1760–1795)

4 Duos for violin and viola, Op. 5
3 Duos for violin and viola, Op. 10
3 Sonatas for violin and viola

- Olga Neuwirth (b. 1968)

Remnants of Songs ... an Amphigory for viola and orchestra (2009); Boosey & Hawkes

- Maria Newman (b. 1962)

Dances for Deliverance for viola solo (1993)
Hansen Suite, Four Hymns for viola choir (1999, revised 2006)

- Sidney Newman (1906–1971)

A Song of Sleep for tenor and viola, Op. 7 (1929); words by W. H. Davies; Scottish Music Centre

- George Newson (b. 1932)

From the New Divan for viola, mixed chorus and orchestra (1982, 1993); words by Edwin Morgan; Alfred Lengnick

- Casimir Ney (1801–1877)

Fantaisie brillante for viola and piano, Op. 12
Fantaisie sur la Sicilienne de A. Gouffé for violin or viola and piano, Op. 25 (1856)
Polka brillante et facile for 2 violas (1860)
24 Préludes dans les 24 tons de la gamme (24 Preludes in All Keys) for viola solo, Op. 22 (published c.1849–1853)
1^{er} Quadrille brillant for flute or viola and piano (1842)
Voir Callaunt, Pièce de salon for violin or viola and piano (1856)

- Dimitri Nicolau (1946–2008)

In Singing and Complaint (... nel canto e nel lamento) for viola solo, Op. 62 (1986); Edipan Musical Editions
Nyctes for viola solo and chamber ensemble, Op. 97 (1991); J. Trekel Musikverlag
Sehnsuchtkonzert for viola and large orchestra, Op. 122
Single with Variations for viola solo, Op. 152; Mnemes
Sonata for viola and harp, Op. 252
Strassenmusik Nr. 4 (Street Music No. 4) for viola soloist equipped with bass drum and hit hat, Op. 51 No. 4
Strassenmusik Nr. 6 (Street Music No. 6) for viola, cello and referee whistle, Op. 51 No. 6
Volti Mediterranei with viola concertante and chamber orchestra, Op. 266

- Carl Nielsen (1865–1931)

Tro og håb spiller (Faith and Hope Are Playing) from Moderen for flute and viola, Op. 41, FS 94 (1920); Edition Wilhelm Hansen

- Tage Nielsen (1929–2003)

Salon for flute, viola and harp (1984); Edition Samfundet
A Sentimental Journey for percussion and viola (2002); Edition Samfundet

- Lewis Nielson (b. 1950)

An die Ferne for solo viola (1980); American Composers Alliance
Concerto for viola and orchestra (1980); American Composers Alliance
Lizard Blizzard for solo viola (2002); American Composers Alliance
Music for viola and piano (1982); American Composers Alliance

- Serge Nigg (1924–2008)

Concerto No. 1 for viola and orchestra (1987–1988); Éditions Gérard Billaudot
Concerto No. 2 for viola and orchestra (2000); Éditions Gérard Billaudot

- Phil Nimmons (1923–2024)

Interlude for viola and piano (1951); Canadian Music Centre

- Joaquín Nin (1879–1949)

Chants d'espagne for viola and piano (1986); arrangement for viola and piano by David Dalton; Éditions Max Eschig

- Akira Nishimura (b. 1953)

Canon Waves (波のカノン) for viola quartet (1994)
Concerto "Flame and Shadow" (焔と影) for viola and orchestra (1996); Zen-On Music Company
Concerto for viola and string orchestra (2002); Zen-On Music Company
Fantasia on "Song of the Birds" (「鳥の歌」による幻想曲) for viola solo (2005); Zen-On Music Company
Sakura (桜) for 8 violas (2011); Schott Japan
Sonata I "Whirl Dance" (無伴奏ヴィオラ･ソナタ第1番〈旋回舞踊〉) for viola solo (2005); Zen-On Music Company
Sonata II "Mantra on the C-String" (無伴奏ヴィオラ･ソナタ第2番〈C線のマントラ〉) for viola solo (2007); Zen-On Music Company

- Roger Nixon (1921–2009)

Concerto for viola and orchestra (1969); Carl Fischer
Elegiac Rhapsody for viola and orchestra
Four Duos for violin (or flute, or oboe) and viola (published 1966); Theodore Presser Company

- Marlos Nobre (b. 1939)

Desafio I (Challenge I) for viola and string orchestra, Op. 31 No. 1 (1968); Tonos International
Poema II for viola and piano, Op. 94 No. 2 (2002)
Sonata for viola solo, Op. 11 (1963); Tonos Musikverlage

- David Noon (b. 1946)

Duo for 2 violas, Op. 19 (1968); Carl Fischer

- Erik Nordgren (1913–1992)

Arioso for solo viola and Orchestra, Op. 2 (1942); STIM; Swedish Music Information Centre
Medley of Swedish Folk Tunes for viola and piano (1949); STIM; Swedish Music Information Centre

- Pehr Henrik Nordgren (1944–2008)

Concerto No. 1 for viola and orchestra, Op. 12 (1970); Finnish Music Information Centre
Concerto No. 2 for viola and orchestra, Op. 48 (1979); Finnish Music Information Centre
Concerto No. 3 for viola and chamber orchestra, Op. 68 (1986); Finnish Music Information Centre
Concerto for viola, double bass and chamber orchestra, Op. 87 (1993); Finnish Music Information Centre

- Arne Nordheim (1931–2010)

Brudd (Fracture) for viola solo (2001); Edition Wilhelm Hansen
Duplex for violin and viola (1990); Edition Wilhelm Hansen
Partita for viola, harpsichord and percussion (1963); Edition Wilhelm Hansen
Tenebrae for cello (or viola) and chamber orchestra (1981–1982, 2001); Edition Wilhelm Hansen

- Jesper Nordin (b. 1971)

El pajaro con la quijada de burro (The Bird with the Donkey Jawbone) for violin, viola and tape (1999–2000); Pizzicato Verlag Helvetia; Swedish Music Information Centre
Ma-Xia (馬夏) for viola solo (1997); STIM; Swedish Music Information Centre

- Per Nørgård (1932–2025)

Billet Doux à Madame C. for alto flute, viola and harp (2005); Edition Wilhelm Hansen
Hedda Gabler Suite for viola, harp and piano (1993); Edition Wilhelm Hansen
Libro Per Nobuko for viola solo (1992); Edition Wilhelm Hansen
Remembering Child for viola and chamber orchestra (1986); Edition Wilhelm Hansen
The Rosy-Fingered Dawn for viola, flute and guitar (1998); Edition Wilhelm Hansen

- Andrew Norman (b. 1979)

Sabina for viola solo (2008); Andrew Norman Music; Edition Schott; Project Schott New York

- Ludvig Norman (1831–1885)

Sonata in G minor for viola and piano, Op. 32 (published 1875)

- Christopher Norton (b. 1953)

Microjazz, 13 Pieces for viola and piano (1985–1989); Boosey & Hawkes

- Jan Novák (1921–1984)

Sonata da chiesa I for viola and organ (1981); Český Hudební Fond

- Emmanuel Nunes (1941–2012)

Einspielung III for viola solo (1981); Éditions Jobert
Impromptu pour un voyage II for flute, viola and harp (1974–1975); Éditions Jobert
Improvisation II: Portrait for viola solo (2002); G. Ricordi, München
La Main noire for 3 violas (2006–2007); after the opera Das Märchen; G. Ricordi, München
Versus III for alto flute and viola (1987–1990); G. Ricordi, München

- Michael Nyman (b. 1944)

Drowning by Numbers for violin, viola and chamber orchestra (1998); Chester Music
I'll Stake My Cremona to a Jew's Trump for electric violin and viola (1983); Chester Music
Trysting Fields (from Drowning by Numbers) for violin, viola, string orchestra and harp (1992); Chester Music
Viola and Piano for viola and piano (1995); Chester Music

- Gösta Nystroem (1890–1966)

Concerto "Hommage à la France" for viola and orchestra (1940); Edition Suecia
