= Gilardi =

Gilardi is an Italian surname. Notable people with the surname include:

- Domenico Gilardi (1785–1845), Italian architect
- Enrico Gilardi (born 1957), Italian basketball player
- Fabrizio Gilardi (born 1975), Swiss political scientist
- Gianpietro Gilardi (born 1938), Italian rower
- Gilardo Gilardi (1889–1963), Argentine composer, pianist and conductor
  - Gilardo Gilardi Conservatory of Music
- Juan Ignacio Gilardi (born 1981). Argentine field hockey player
- Luigi Gilardi (1897–1989), Italian cyclist
- Mauro Gilardi (born 1982), Italian footballer
- Max Gilardi (born 1988), American animator
- Miguel Ángel Gilardi, Argentine orchestra conductor
- Pier Celestino Gilardi (1837–1905), Italian painter
- Piero Gilardi (1942–2023), Italian artist
- Thierry Gilardi (1958–2008), French football commentator

== See also ==
- Ghilardi
- Ghirardi
