= Juan Carlos Paz =

Argentine composer (1897–1972)

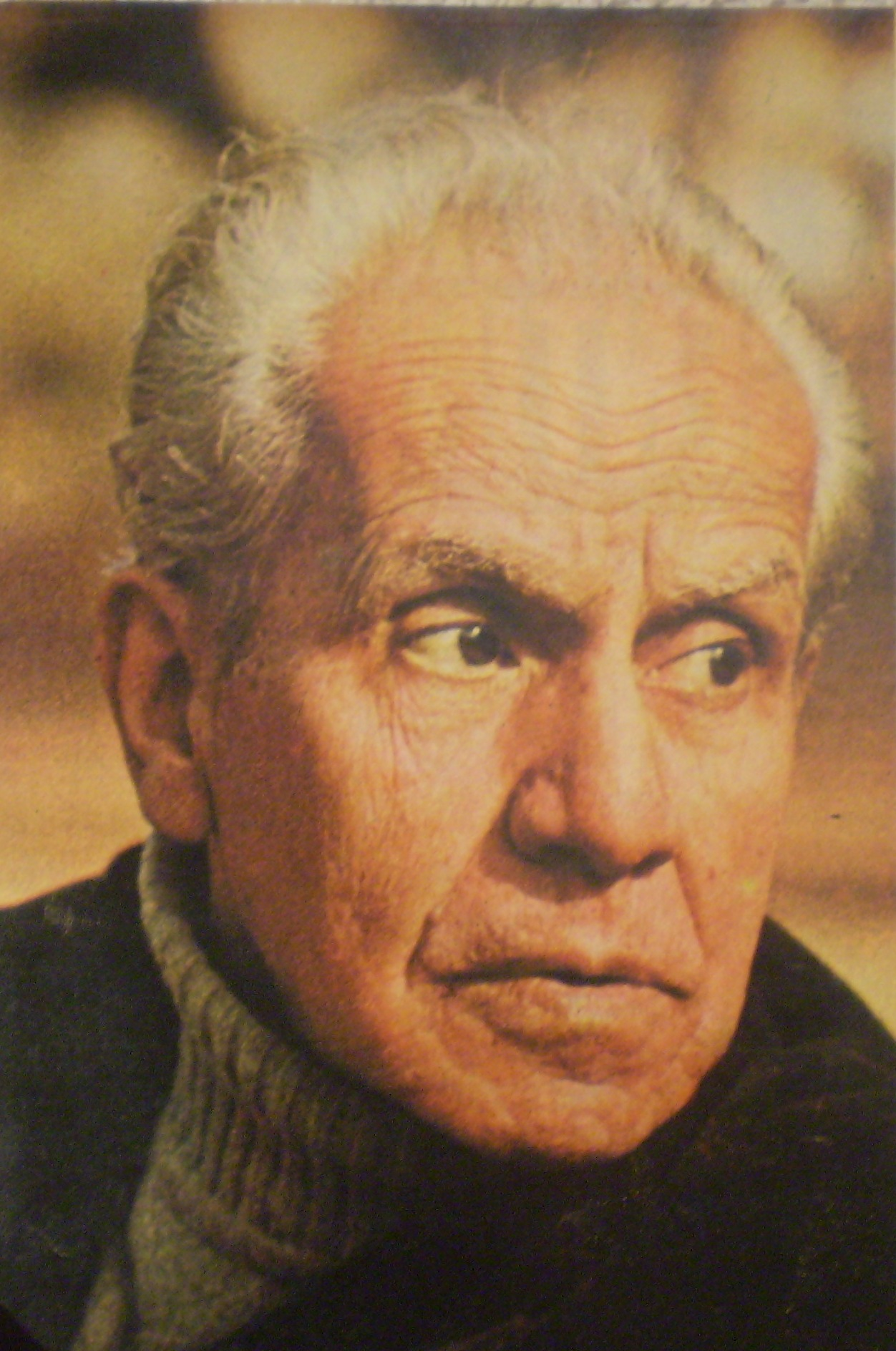
Juan Carlos Paz

Juan Carlos Paz (5 August 1897 – 26 August 1972) was an Argentine composer and music theorist.

== Early life and education ==
Paz was born in Buenos Aires, where he studied piano with Roberto Nery and composition with Constantino Gaito and Eduardo Fornarini. He also studied organ with Jules Beyer, and then travelled to Paris to work with Vincent d'Indy at the Schola Cantorum.

== Career ==
On 22 October 1929, a shared enthusiasm for new musical developments caused him, together with Juan José Castro and José María Castro, Gilardo Gilardi, and Jacobo Ficher, to form the Grupo renovación, with the aim of promoting the cause of modern music in Argentina. In 1936, Paz left the group to found his own concert series, the Conciertos de la Nueva Música.

Paz was firmly opposed to the folkloristic approach to music that was widespread in Latin America in the 1930s and 1940s. Opinions differ about his earliest compositional styles. According to one authority, in the 1920s and early 1930s, his music was post-Romantic, with influences from César Franck and Richard Strauss; another writer describes this same period (1920–27) as characterized by neoclassical polyphony. The former author regards Igor Stravinsky's neoclassicism and jazz as Paz's focus in the 1930s, whereas the latter describes his second period (1927–1934) as "marked by atonal melodic idiom and polytonal harmony". Both authors agree that in the 1930s he was investing the diverse styles and techniques prevalent worldwide at that time, and particularly Arnold Schoenberg's twelve-tone technique, which Paz introduced to Argentina. He was particularly attracted by Anton Webern's music, and from 1934 adopted twelve-tone writing, which he continued to use until 1950. Though he continued to maintain that Schoenberg's methods deserved to be better-known and understood, publishing in 1954 a book Arnold Schoenberg, o el fin de la era tonal, he abandoned the technique in his own compositions, evolving a new experimental, highly structured idiom. In the mid-1960s, however, he gave up composing altogether.

Paz's pupils included Susana Baron Supervielle and Francisco Kröpfl who, amongst others like him, was a member of the Agrupación Nueva Música.
