= Anida =

Anida may refer to:

- Anida(Lakhavad), a village in Palitana (Vidhan Sabha constituency), Bhavnagar, Gujarat, India
- Anida (album), a 1996 album by Diana Haddad
- Anida Yoeu Ali (born 1974), Cambodian-American artist
- Siti Anida Lestari Quryantin, Indonesian badminton winner in the 2010 Giraldilla International
- Anida, a village in Dhari (Vidhan Sabha constituency), Amreli, Gujarat, India
- Anida, a village in Gadhada (Vidhan Sabha constituency), Botad, Gujarat, India
- Anida, a 1998 composition for viola by Henri Lazarof
- "Anida", song by Diana Haddad from the 1997 album Ahl Al Esheg
