= Moscardini =

Moscardini is an Italian surname. Notable people with the surname include:

- Carlos Moscardini (born 1959), Argentine composer and guitarist
- Giovanni Moscardini (1897–1985), Italian-Scottish footballer
- Lauro Moscardini (born 1961), Italian astrophysicist and cosmologist

== See also ==
- Moscardi
