= Ghirardi =

Ghirardi is a surname. It may refer to:

- Giovanni Battista Pinello di Ghirardi (c. 1544–1587), Italian music composer and Kapellmeister of the Italian Renaissance
- Giancarlo Ghirardi (1935–2018), Italian physicist and emeritus professor of theoretical physics
- Lea Ghirardi (born 1974), French tennis player
- Tommaso Ghirardi (born 1975), Italian businessman in the mechanics industry. Also known for having served as chairman (of BoD) and owner of Italian association football club Parma F.C. from January 2007 to December 2014.

== See also ==
- Ghirardi–Rimini–Weber theory (GRW; also known as spontaneous collapse theory), a collapse theory in quantum mechanics
- Orto Botanico "G.E. Ghirardi", aka Giardino Botanico sperimentale "E. Ghirardi" and the Orto botanico di Toscolano Maderno, a botanical garden operated by the University of Milan, and located on Via Religione, Toscolano-Maderno on the western shore of Lake Garda, province of Brescia, Lombardy, Italy.
- Nature Reserve of Ghirardi, nature reserve located in the province of Parma, Emilia-Romagna, Italy
- Gherardi
- Gilardi
- Ghilardi
