= Arturo Berutti =

Argentine composer

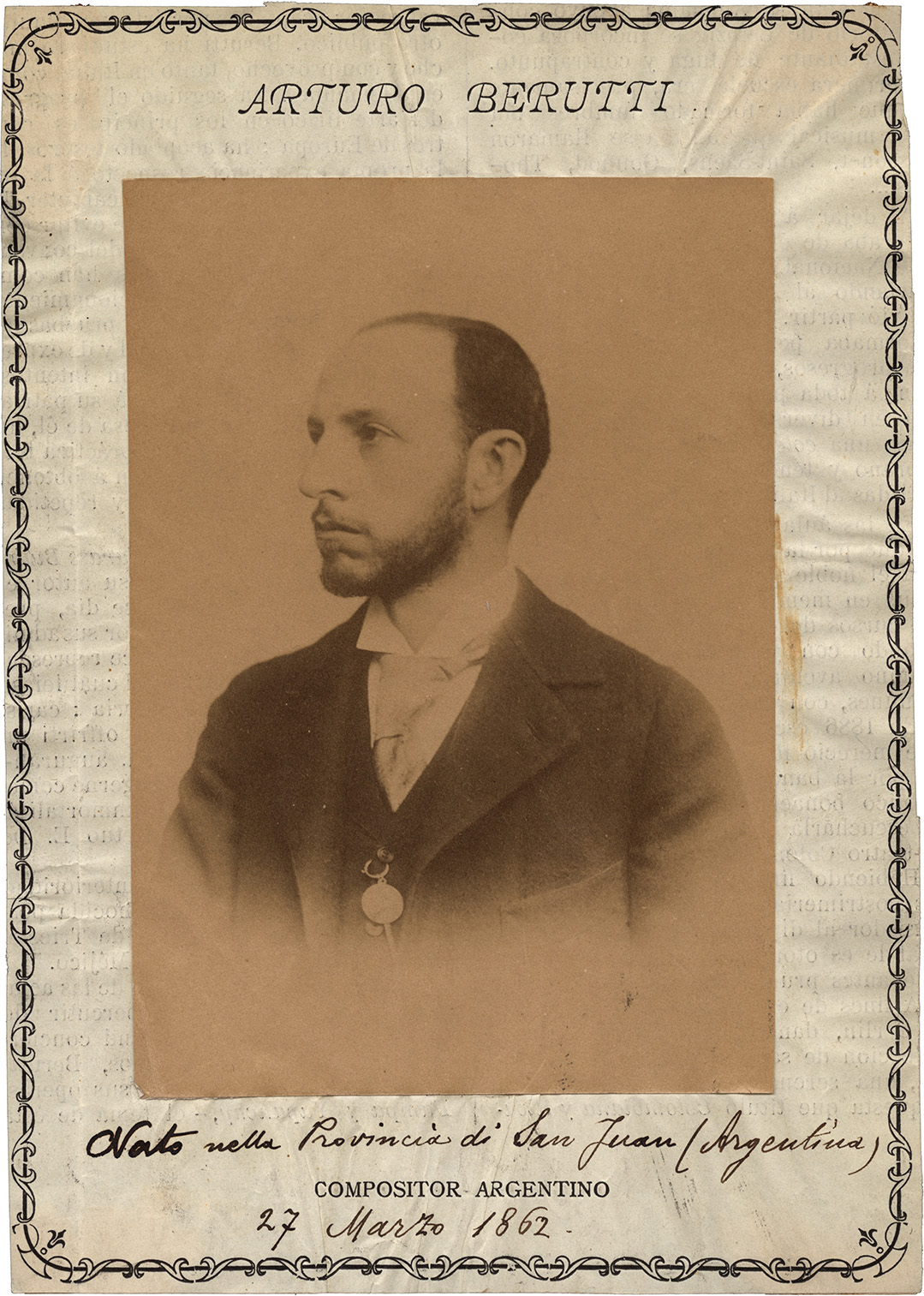
Arturo Berutti

Arturo Berutti (c. 27 March 1862 – 3 January 1938) was an Argentine composer of classical music and librettos. He was best known for his notable theme Pampa (1897). The opera was based on the life of Juan Moreira. One of the influential Argentine opera composers of the late 19th and early 20th century and his music was influenced by the Italian opera. In 1895, he composed the opera Taras Bulba inspired on the novel by Nikolai Gogol.

== Life ==
He was born on 14 March 1858 or on 27 March 1862 in San Juan, Argentina. (Note: Many sources give 1858, but his birth registration was also given as 27 March 1862.) Berutti studied law in Buenos Aires. Thanks to his winning talent in 1884, with scholarship at the music stadium and he was able to study in Europe. He began his education at the Leipzig Conservatory with Carl Reinecke and Salomon Jadassohn and later studied in Paris, France, in 1889 and Milan, Italy, by 1890, where he was interested with the lyrics in Italian and in 1892, he composed his first classical operas Vendetta and Evangelina. He returned to his native Argentina in 1896 to focus on his composition work of writing various operas, the mostly on under his South American libretto issues. He was a pioneer of Argentine lyrics. He was also a music professor of Gilardo Gilardi Conservatory of Music, where he studied with him in Buenos Aires. He was also of his predominant production lyrics, what in much cases combined issues of Argentine folklore music. Berutti composed including with symphony, sonata and songs. Between his script highlights the treaty translation of the harmony of Salomon Jadassohn. Berutti died on 3 January 1938, aged 76 or 80, in Buenos Aires.

Felipe Boero was one of his students.

== Works ==
- Vendetta, opera, 1892.
- Evangelina, opera based on the novel by Henry Wadsworth Longfellow, 1893.
- Taras Bulba, opera based on the novel by Nikolai Gogol, 1895.
- Pampa, opera about Juan Moreira, by Eduardo Gutiérrez, 1897.
- Yupanki, opera on by Vicente Fidel López, 1899.
- Khrysé, opera with libretto based on the novel by Pierre Louÿs Afrodita, 1902.
- Nox horrida, opera, 1908.
- Gli Eroi, opera with libretto by Vicente Fidel López, 1919.
