= Roberto García Morillo =

Argentine composer (1911–2003)

Roberto García Morillo (January 22, 1911 – October 26, 2003) was an Argentine composer, musicologist, music professor and music critic.

== Biography ==
García Morillo was born in Buenos Aires, Argentina, where he studied at the Conservatorio Nacional de Música "Carlos López Buchardo" (with José André, Floro M. Ugarte, José Gil, and Constantino Gaito), and in Paris studied piano with Yves Nat (Salgado 2001).

Morillo died on October 26, 2003.

He worked as a music critic for the newspaper La Nación starting in 1938, and subsequently published in many Argentine and North American periodicals. He was appointed to joint positions as professor of composition in both the national and the municipal conservatories in Buenos Aires in 1942 (Salgado 2001).

Curriculum:

- Director of the Conservatorio Nacional de Música "Carlos López Buchardo" (1972–79)
- Professor of Composition at the Conservatorio Municipal de Música and at the Antiguo Conservatorio "Beethoven"
- Music critic of the newspaper La Nación (1938–79)
- Member of the Comisión de Música Sinfónica y de Cámara de SADAIC
- Vicepresident of the Asociación Argentina de Compositores (AAC)
- President of the Unión Compositores de la Argentina (CUDA)
- Member of the Senato Académico del Centro Internazionale di Studi Musicali (Rome), Sociedad Internacional de Musicología and Internationale Gesellschaft für Urheberrecht (INTERCU) of Munich
- Jury member of several national and international competitions (Rio de Janeiro, Taormina, Montevideo, etc.).

Morillo's pupils included Regina Benavente (Ficher, Furman Schleifer, and Furman 2002, 17–)

== Works ==
His compositional style was never nationalistic, though most of his works from 1939 onward display the influence of Spanish culture (Salgado 2001). He received awards from the Comisión Nacional de Cultura, Municipalidad de la Ciudad de Buenos Aires, Asociación Wagneriana, SADAIC, Rotary Club, and the Dante Alighieri Scholarship (1952).

His works have been commissioned by:

- Radio Nacional Argentina
- Asociación de Conciertos de Cámara
- Asociación Amigos de la Música
- Festival de Música de Tucumán
- Asociación "El Piano"
- Asociación Argentina de Compositores (AAC)
- Fabien Scvitzky (Tchaikowsky Festival, 1959)
- Municipalidad de la Ciudad de Buenos Aires
- Teatro Colón
- Yacimientos Petrolíferos Fiscales (YOF)
- Asociación Amigos del Coro Nacional de Niños
- IV Festival Interamericano de Música (Washington).

== Sources ==
- Ficher, Miguel, Martha Furman Schleifer, and John M. Furman. 2002. Latin American Classical Composers: A Biographical Dictionary. Lanham, MD: Scarecrow Press. ISBN 978-1-4616-6911-1.
- Salgado, Susana. 2001. "García Morillo, Roberto". The New Grove Dictionary of Music and Musicians, second edition, edited by Stanley Sadie and John Tyrrell. London: Macmillan Publishers.
