= Julia Stilman-Lasansky =

Argentine composer

Ada Julia Stilman-Lasansky (February 3, 1935 – March 29, 2007) was an Argentine composer who moved to the United States in 1964.

Stilman-Lasansky was born in Buenos Aires, where she studied piano with Roberto Castro and composition with Gilardo Gilardi. After moving to the United States, she earned a M.M. and D.M.A. at the University of Maryland, then pursued further studies at Yale University. Stilman-Lasansky’s teachers included Leon Kirchner, Lawrence Moss, Krysztof Penderecki, and Morton Subotnick.

Stilman-Lasansky received a Phi Kappa Phi award in 1972 and a grant from the National Endowment for the Arts (NEA) in 1974. The NEA commissioned her Cantata No. 4. Stilman-Lasansky was a member of the American Society of University Composers. She lived in Maryland for many years, and died in Paris in 2007.

Stilman-Lasansky’s compositions included:

== Chamber ==
- Cello Quartet
- Cuadrados y Angulos (trumpet, sax, piano and timpani; text by Alfonsina Storni)
- Etudes (string quatrtet)
- Etudes (woodwind quintet)

== Orchestral and Choral ==
- The Facets of Diamond Love (cycle of 5 cantatas)
  - Cantata No. 1 El Oro Intio (bass and orchestra; text by Amado Nervo)
  - Cantata No. 2 Cantares de la Madre Joven (seven female soloists and orchestra; text by Rabindranath Tagore)
  - Cantata No. 3 Barcarola (chorus and orchestra; text by Pablo Neruda)
  - Cantata No. 4 Magic Rituals of the Golden Dawn (text by William Butler Yeats)
  - Cantata No. 5 Magic Rituals (circa 1997) (setting of "A deep sworn vow" by William Butler Yeats and the first strophe of the Old French "Le lai des amants")

== Piano ==
- Sonata Visiones Primera

== Solo vocal ==
- songs
