= Lawrence Moss =

American composer (1927–2022)

Lawrence Kenneth Moss (November 18, 1927 – June 24, 2022) was an American composer of contemporary classical music. He was born in Los Angeles.

He held a B.A. degree from the University of California, Los Angeles, an M.A. from the Eastman School of Music, and a Ph.D. in music composition from the University of Southern California, where his instructors included Leon Kirchner and Ingolf Dahl.

He taught at Mills College, Yale University (1960-1968), and the University of Maryland, College Park (1969-2014). His notable students include Jeffrey Mumford, Liviu Marinescu, Julia Stilman-Lasansky, and Susan Cohn Lackman.

He received two Guggenheim Fellowships (1959 and 1968), a Fulbright Scholarship, and four grants from the National Endowment for the Arts.

Moss composed operatic, instrumental, and electronic music. His music is published by Theodore Presser, Association for the Promotion of New Music (A.P.N.M.), McGinnis & Marx, Alfred Publishing Co., Roncorp Inc., Northeastern Music Programs, and Seesaw Music Corp.

His music has been recorded on the CRI, Desto, Opus One, Albany, Capstone, Orion, EMF, Spectrum, Advance, and AmCam labels.

Moss died in Silver Spring, Maryland on June 24, 2022, aged 94.
