= Ghilardi =

Ghilardi (pronounced [ɡiˈlardi]) is an Italian surname. Notable people with the surname include:

- Alberto Ghilardi (1909–1971), Italian cyclist
- Aline Ghilardi (born 1986), Brazilian biologist and palaeontologist
- Daniele Ghilardi (born 2003), Italian footballer
- Luigi Ghilardi (1805–1864), Italian general
- Rebecca Ghilardi (born 1999), Italian pair skater

== See also ==
- Gilardi
- Ghirardi
- Ghilardotti
- Ghilarducci
