= Susana Baron Supervielle =

Argentine composer (1910–2004)

Susana Baron Supervielle de Tresca (1910 – 17 May 2004) was an Argentine composer.

Born in Buenos Aires, in 1910, Supervielle began her musical education under Gilardo Gilardi and Juan Carlos Paz. In 1945, interested in the avant-garde concrete music that Pierre Schaeffer was experimenting with in Paris, she moved there and joined the newly formed Groupe de Recherche de Musique Concrète at his direction. At the same time, she studied with Nadia Boulanger and later, in São Paulo, with Hans-Joachim Koellreutter. She authored several works for piano and instrumental chamber ensembles, but is best known for her vocal pieces with piano accompaniment, with some sixty compositions.

She married Jorge Tresca and settled in Brazil where she continued her studies in musicology and composition, where she died on 17 May 2004, aged 94.
