= Regina Benavente =

Argentine composer

Regina Benavente (born January 21, 1932) is an Argentinian composer.

== Biography ==
Born in Buenos Aires, Benavente was the daughter of Manuel José Benavente, with whom she had her first music lessons. She then entered the Conservatorio Nacional Superior de Música, where she studied harmony, counterpoint, piano, and music history. Her instructors there included Abraham Jurafsky, Roberto García Morillo, Pedro Sáenz Amadeo, Gilardo Gilardi, and Rafael González. She also took lessons from Alberto Ginastera, and in 1967 and 1968 was a pupil at the Centro Latinoamericano de Altos Estudios Musicales.

During her career, she has taught harmony and counterpoint at the Conservatorio Nacional Superior de Música and at the Santa Ana Institute in Buenos Aires. As a composer, Benavente has produced a number of works for orchestra; she has also composed for chamber forces, for piano, for voice, and for chorus, and has been active in the realm of electronic music as well.
