= Moscardi =

Moscardi is an Italian surname. Notable people with the surname include:

- Alessandro Moscardi (born 1969), Italian former rugby union player
- Matteo Moscardi, Italian rugby union player

== See also ==
- Moscardini
