= Carlos Moscardini =

Argentine composer and guitarist

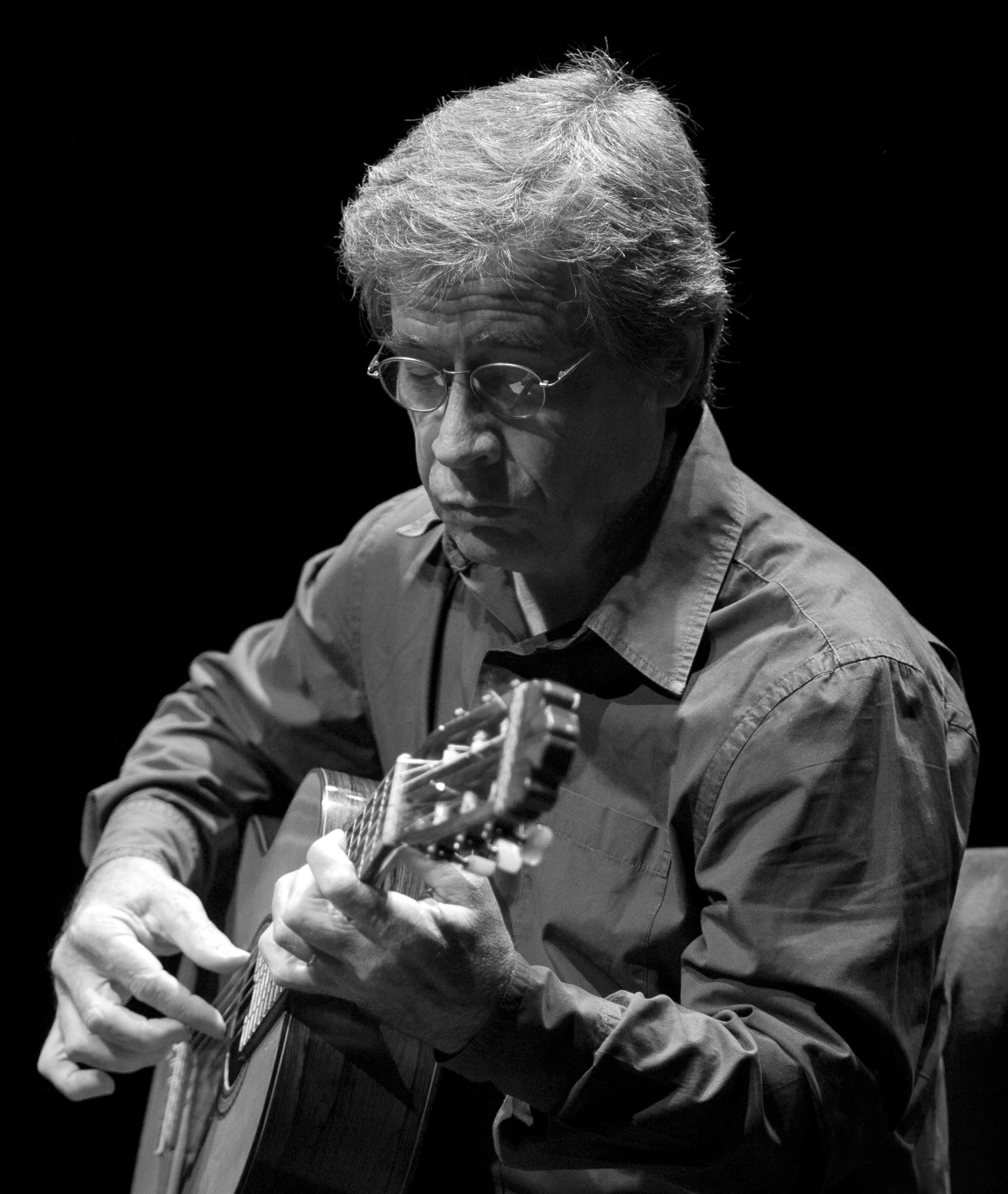

Carlos Moscardini (born 1959) is an Argentine composer and guitarist. He is professor of guitar at the Gilardo Gilardi Conservatory of Music and Manuel de Falla Conservatory of Music in Buenos Aires.

Moscardini was born in Lomas de Zamora, in the Gran Buenos Aires metropolitan area.

After winning the Soloist Prize for guitar at the first New Popular Music Meeting in his province, he recorded his first solo album, El corazon manda, on Epsa records. The album features compositions of his own and arrangements of famous Argentine folk music. His work won him the public admiration of the guitarist Juan Falù. Then he recorded the CDs "Buenos Aires de Raíz" ^{—} "Silencios del Suburbio" - "Maldita Huella" with Luciana Jury (Epsa Music, Argentina) — "Horizonte Infinito" (Winter & Winter, Germany) - "Manos" (Hummock Label, Japan) and "En Vivo en la Usina" with Juan Falú (Alfiz Producciones, Argentina). In 2015, he received the "National Music Prize" awarded by the Ministry of Culture of his country.

Carlos Moscardini has performed in Argentina and more than 20 countries around the world. He has played with the band Nan at the Montreal Jazz Festival. In Japan, he performed over 50 concerts as The History of the Tango. The Buenos Aires Teatro San Martin appointed him composer and arranger. He has lectured on the interpretation of Argentine music at the Norges Musikhögskole in Oslo, at the Royal Danish Academy of Music in Copenhagen, and at the Académie de musique in Ghent.
