= Georges Lonque =

Belgian conductor and musicologist

Georges Lonque (Ghent, 8 November 1900 – Brussels, 3 March 1967) was a Belgian composer, music teacher, conductor and violinist. His father was Séraphin Lonque and his younger brother was Armand Lonque. All three of them composed music.

== Life ==
Lonque received his first music teachings from his father, who taught the viola at the Royal Conservatory of Ghent. At the age of 11, he began his studies at this Conservatory, where he studied solfège (Oscar Roels), violin (Johan Smit), chamber music (Albert Zimmer), harmony (Léon Moeremans), counterpoint (Emile Mathieu) and fugue (Martin Lunssens). He won the Emile Mathieu prize in 1927 with his Sonate in Fis majeur for violin and piano. In 1927 and 1929, he competed in the Prix de Rome and won a second prize for his cantata Antigone.

Thanks to a grant by the Belgian government Lonque was able to travel through Germany, Austria and France to study music. During these travels he met composers such as Richard Strauss, Robert Heger and Gabriel Perné.

Lonque played the violin at the orchestra of the Royal Opera of Ghent (1914-1932). In 1935, he found the Foyer de la Musique de Chambre. He also conducted the Ghent Opera Concerts during the Second World War.

Lonque worked at the Royal Conservatory of Ghent (1924-1965). He also succeeded Karel De Sutter as director of the Music Academy of Ronse between 1938 and 1965.

He gained several prices for his musical output, among which a golden medal by the city of Paris for his activities in France.

== Compositions ==
=== Works for orchestra ===
- 1926 Impressions d'Hemelryck, op. 5
- 1926 La danse au clair de lune, for violin and orchestra, op. 7
- 1930 Aura, symphonic poem, op. 13
- 1933 Wiener Walzer, op. 17
- 1934 Poème de la Mer, for orchestra, op. 19
- 1935 Images d'Orient, for alto saxophone and orchestra, op. 20
- 1939 Porcelaines de Saxe, op. 25
- 1943 Prélude e Aria, for cello and orchestra, op. 30
- 1944 Estrella, for violin and orchestra, op. 37
- 1948 Concert in b mineur, for violin and orchestra, op. 40

=== Masses and liturgical music ===
- 1941 Missa pro Pace, for tenor, male choir and orchestra (or organ)
- 1941 Benedictus Deus, for tenor, mixed choir (ad libitum) and organ, op. 27

=== Vocal music ===
==== Cantatas ====
- 1927 Le Rossignol, for solo voices, mixed choir and orchestra, op. 8
- 1929 Antigone, for solo voices, mixed choir and orchestra, op. 12

==== Songs ====
- 1924 Je n'ai pas oublié, for soprano and piano, op. 2 - text: Charles Baudelaire
- 1924 Vos yeux, for soprano and piano, op. 3 - text: Charles Le Goffic
- 1932 Au gré des vents, for voice and piano, op. 16 - text: Andrée Dupont
- 1933 Dernières feuilles, for contra-alto (or bariton) and piano, op. 18 - text: Armand Silvestre
- 1933 Faune, for soprano and piano, op. 21 - text: Georges Marlow
- 1957 La question, for soprano and piano, op. 46 - text: Jacques Bastian
- 1957 Portrait, for voice and piano, op. 47 - text: Jacques Bastian

=== Chamber music ===
- 1925 Sonate in Fis majeur, for violin and piano
- 1930 Caprice, for violin and piano, op. 14
- 1930 Images d'orient, for alto saxophone (or viola) and piano
- 1937 Strijkkwartet in f mineur, op. 24
- 1943 Prélude et aria, for cello and piano, op. 30
- 1950 Afgoden - Idoles, for clarinet and piano, op. 41
- Poème de la mer, for violin and piano, op. 19

=== Piano music ===
- 1924 Chanson à bercer, op. 1
- 1929 Danse espagnole - Spaanse dans, op. 10
- 1929 Nuits d'automne - Herfstnacht, op. 11
- 1939 Sonatine in D majeur, op. 32
- 1942 Danse mauresque - Moorse dans, op. 29
- 1945 Sonatine in G majeur, op. 36
- 1947 Capitaine Pimpol, op. 39
- 1952 Voilier - Zeilboot, op. 42
- 1955 Nocturne, op. 45
- 1952 Tableaux d'une chambre bleue, op. 43

== Sources ==
- Flavie Roquet: Lexicon: Vlaamse componisten geboren na 1800, Roeselare, Roularta Books, 2007, 946 p., ISBN 978-90-8679-090-6.
- Thierry Levaux: Dictionnaire des compositeurs de Belgique du moyen âge à nos jours, Ohain-Lasne: Éditions Art in Belgium sprl, 2006. 736 p., ISBN 2-930338-37-7.
