= Jeffrey Mumford =

American classical composer

Jeffrey Mumford (born June 22, 1955) is a U.S. composer whose orchestral works have been performed by the National Symphony Orchestra, Minnesota Orchestra, Atlanta Symphony Orchestra, Cleveland Orchestra, Saint Paul Chamber Orchestra, Cincinnati Symphony Orchestra and American Composers Orchestra. His music has been especially praised by The New York Times as being "a philosophy of music making that embraced both raw passion and a gentle imagistic poetry." Mumford's compositions, though thoroughly modern, are evocative, exploring the sensuous and tactile nature of sound in subtle and sophisticated ways.

Mumford was born in Washington, D.C., and holds degrees from the University of California, Irvine (B.A., 1977) and the University of California, San Diego (M.A., 1981). He was a student of Elliott Carter and Lawrence Moss.

Mumford, along with poet Bruce Weigl, holds the rank of Distinguished Professor in the Division of Arts and Humanities at Lorain County Community College in Ohio. Formerly he taught at the Washington Conservatory of Music (1989–99), served as Artist-in-Residence at Bowling Green State University (1999-00), and served as assistant professor of composition and Composer-in-Residence at the Oberlin College Conservatory of Music.

He has received grants from the Guggenheim Foundation, American Music Center, Ohio Arts Council, and ASCAP Foundation, and has been awarded seven Meet the Composer grants. His works have been recorded by the CRI label, and on Albany CDs, and his scores are published by Theodore Presser.
