= Gilardo Gilardi =

Argentine composer, pianist, and conductor (1889–1963)

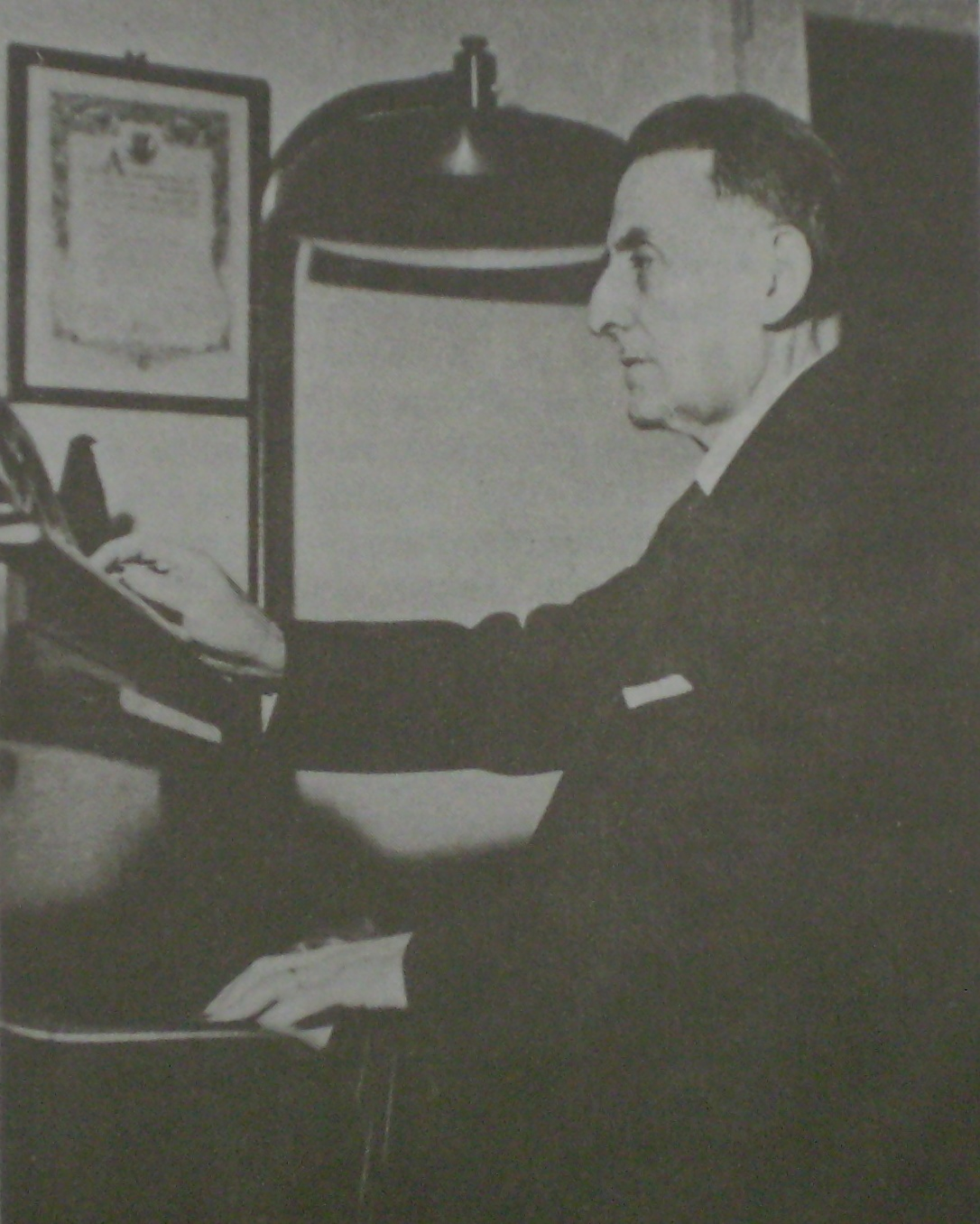

Gilardo Gilardi (May 25, 1889 – January 16, 1963) was an Argentine composer, pianist, and conductor who was the eponym of the Gilardo Gilardi Conservatory of Music in La Plata, Buenos Aires.

He was born in San Fernando, Argentina and first learned music from his father before studying with the composer Arturo Berutti in Buenos Aires. He began composing as a teenager and he premiered his first opera, Ilse, at Teatro Colón opera house, aged 23. He co-founded the group Renovación (Renovation) in 1929, but left three years later, in 1932. He was professor at the University of La Plata and wrote an elementary course on harmony. Gilardi experimented with the pentatonic scale and Americas' Indigenous music. Some of their works are the operas Ilse (1923) and La leyenda del Urutaú (The legend of the Urutaú) (1935), Primera serie argentina, (First Argentine series), Evocación quechua, Gaucho con botas nuevas (Gaucho with new boots) (1938, orchestra), a symphonic poem which won a national prize in 1939. Among his religious music Réquiem (1933) and Misa de Gloria (Glory Mass) (1936) are particularly esteemed. He also composed chamber music pieces: Sonata for violin and piano, Songs for voice and piano, Argentine popular Sonata for violin and piano and various piano pieces.

Gilardi's pupils included Regina Benavente, Ana Serrano Redonnet, Julia Stilman-Lasansky, and Susana Baron Supervielle. His son Miguel Angel Gilardi is orchestra conductor.

== Works ==
- Ilse, opera based on a Libretto of Cosimo Giogeri Contri, 1919, UA 13 July 1923
- La leyenda del urutaú, opera based on a Libretto of José Oliva Nogueira, 1929, UA 25 October 1934
- Primera serie argentina
- Evocación quechua
- Réquiem, 1933
- Misa de Gloria, 1936
- Gaucho con botas nuevas, symphonic poem, 1938
- Ollantay, incidental music for the play of Ricardo Rojas, 1939
- Sonata para violín y piano
- Canciones para canto y piano
- Sonata popular argentina para violín y piano
