= Liviu Marinescu =

Romanian composer (born 1970)

Liviu Marinescu (born February 12, 1970, in Bucharest) is a Romanian composer of orchestral and chamber music. He teaches at California State University, Northridge.

== Early life ==
He studied music composition at the National University of Music Bucharest with Adrian Iorgulescu, and Cleveland State University with Edwin London. In 2000 he completed his Doctor of Musical Arts degree at University of Maryland, where he worked with Lawrence Moss.

== Career ==
His music has been recorded and released by Capstone Records, Centaur Records, Navona Records and has been performed by the Cleveland Chamber Symphony, Orchestra 2001, Bohuslav Martinu Symphony, as well as the National Chamber Radio Orchestra and the Bucharest Music Academy Symphony in Romania.

In 2002 he was awarded a prize and commission by the Fromm Foundation at Harvard University.

In 1994 began working as a professor. Marinescu taught at Concordia College, West Chester University, University of Maryland and Cleveland State University, and lectured at universities across Europe, including Trondheim Conservatory in Norway, Palacky University in the Czech Republic and the National University of Music in Bucharest.

== Compositions ==
- Bent (2015) — piano and electronics
- Bounce (2014) — trumpet and electronics
- Sway (2013) — percussion and electronics
- Shadows (2012) — piano and electronics
- Shifting Sands (2011) — chamber ensemble
- Harmonic Fields (2010) — fl/cl/perc/pno/vn/cello (1st version) fl/cl/sopr.sax/pno (2nd version) fl/ob/cl/pno (3rd version)
- Echoes (2009) — flute and pre-recorded sound
- Focus (2008) — chamber orchestra
- Instant (2008) — chamber orchestra
- Resonance (2008) — ob/cl/pno
- Morphing (2007) — chamber orchestra
- Moto Perpetuo (2007) — ob/bass cl/perc/vla (1st version) fl/vn/cello/pno (2nd version) ob/cl/bsn/perc/pno/vn/cello (3rd version)
- Duo Perpetuo (2006) — bass clarinet and percussion
- Ostinato (2005) — cello solo and chamber orchestra
- Homage Collage (2004) — clarinet and piano
- Mirage (2003) — large orchestra
- Pastiche (2003) — guitar solo
- Cadenza (2003) — clarinet solo
- Über Alles (2002) — cl/vn/cello/pno/perc
- Bach Variations (2002) — alto sax and pre-recorded sound
- Deja Vu (2001) — chamber orchestra
- Mozamorphosis (2000) — fl/vn/cl
- A-gain (1999) — fl/cl/hn/perc/pno/vn/vc/cb (1st version) ob/cl/bn/perc/pno/vn/vc (2nd version)
- Quodlibet Sonata (1996) — cello (1st version) viola (2nd version)
- Gulag (1996) — chamber orchestra
- A Piacere (1996) — fl/ob/tp/perc/pno
- Ars Nova (1996) — organ
- Spirals (1995) — chamber orchestra
- Equillibrium (1994) — large orchestra
- Chamber Concerto (1993) — string orchestra
- Points, Lines, Spheres (1992) — fl/cl/bn/vn/cello/pno/perc
- 40% Obscurité (1992) — vn/vla/cello/cbass/pno/2 perc
- Sequences (1991) — cl/pno
- 0.001 (1990) — piano
- String Quartet No.1 (1990) — 2 vlns/vla/cello
