= Epsa =

- Company type: Incorporated
- Founded: 1924
- Headquarters: Pilio, Greece
- Products: Soft drinks
- Number of employees: 100 (2012)
- Website: epsa.gr

Epsa (Greek: ΕΨΑ) is the name of a Greek non-alcoholic beverage company based in the city of Volos. It was founded in 1924.

Initially based on lemonades, today it produces various beverages and natural juices. It is one of the most historical beverage companies of Greece.

== Sources ==
- EPSA bio
- Soft drinks in Greece
- Epsa
- Official site
