= Pierrette Mari =

French composer and musicologist

Pierrette Mari (born 1929) is a French composer and musicologist.

== Life and career ==
Pierrette Mari was born in Nice and studied music at the Conservatory of Nice from 1943 to 1946. She entered the Paris Conservatory in 1950, where she studied with Noël Gallon, Tony Aubin and Olivier Messiaen. She won first prize in counterpoint in 1953 and first prize in fugue in 1954. In 1956, she received a scholarship to attend the Music and Theatre Conference in Salzburg. After completing her studies, Mari wrote as a critic for newspapers and music magazines. She also published biographies of notable musicians, including Olivier Messiaen, Béla Bartók and Henri Dutilleux. In 1977 Mari became a lecturer at the University of Paris, Sorbonne.

== Awards ==
- 1946: Prize of the City of Nice
- 1961: First Prize in French melody, the National Union of Arts

== Works ==
Selected music compositions include:

- Psaumes for narrator and orchestra (1954)
- Divertissement for flute and orchestra (1954)
- Le Sous-Préfet aux champs (1956)
- Trois Mouvements for strings
- Concerto for guitar (1971)
- Les Travaux d'Hercule (1973)
- Dialogue avec Louise Labé for voice and strings (1979)
- Ciel de bruyère (Sky of Heather) for viola and piano (1981)
- Escalades sur un piano for piano, dedicated to Maurice Herzog
- Hommage à Jacques Toja, for orchestra (2003)
- Dans l'espace figé, melody on a poem by Andrée Brunin (2012)

Literary works include:

- Olivier Messiaen, 1965
- Béla Bartók, 1970
- Henri Dutilleux, 1974
