= Nature Reserve of Ghirardi =

Nature reserve in Italy

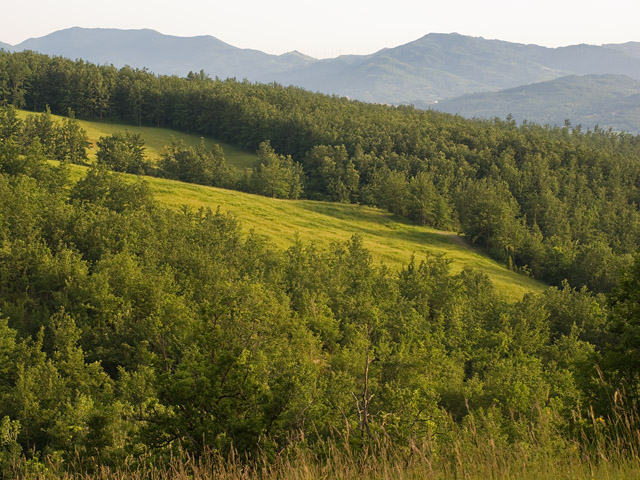
- View of the Nature Reserve of Ghirardi
- Interactive map of Nature Reserve of Ghirardi
- Location: Borgo Val di Taro and Albareto, Emilia-Romagna, Province of Parma, Italy
- Coordinates: 44°31′00″N 9°43′22″E
- Area: 370 ha (910 acres)
- Established: 2010
- Governing body: WWF

The Nature Reserve of Ghirardi is a 370-hectare (910-acre) nature reserve located in the Province of Parma, Emilia-Romagna, Italy. It was established in 2010.

== History ==
Until the 1960s, an extension of 600 ha (1,500 acres) of the area around Case Ghirardi was occupied by a game preserve, the property of Marchini-Camia. When the 1979 Hunting Law allowed the creation of a faunal oasis and it became a protected zone of the faune, supervised the Province of Parma. The Galasso Law 431/85 added to the protection of the faune the protection of the landscape which was then confirmed by the 1993 Piano Territoriale Paesistico Regionale which made it a natural protected zone ex.art.25. In 1996, it began to be part of the Oasis System and of the Reservation of the Italian WWF World Wide Fund for Nature. In 2006, a part of the territory was integrated in Rete Natura 2000 in Emilia Romagna and it became General Regional Reserve on 21 December 2010.

== Territory ==
The nature reserve of Ghirardi is located in the southwestern part of the Province of Parma (Emilia-Romagna Italy, between the towns of Albareto and of Borgo Val di Taro. The area dates back to the Jurassic period. During sedimentation there were frequent tectonic upheavals, for which the area is characterized by folds and faults (among which, the most noticeable is situated along the river Rizzone). The formations that we can find in the oasis are: - Palombini clays; - Ranzano sandstones; -marls of the mount Piano. The Reserve covers an area of 370 ha (910 acres) of wooded hills, hay fields and uncultivated open lands. The woods occupy half of the surface, with turkey oak woods, chestnut groves, and pine plantations. The annual average temperature of the area, varies between 15 and 17 °C (59 and 63 °F). The climate is characterized by dry summers and heavy rainfall in the month of November.

== Flora ==
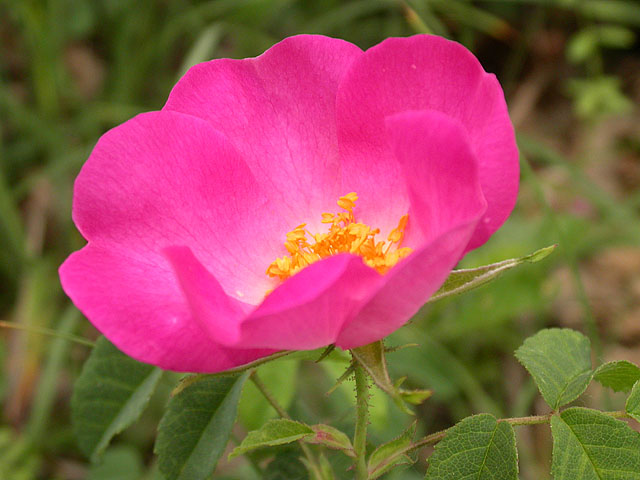
Gallic rose

The vegetation is mainly composed of trees but it also comprehends a percentage of flowers as Lilium bulbiferum, squill, gentians, crocus, dogtooth violet, and rose hips. Moreover, it is possible to see some rare species such as orchids (over 30 species are present). In the Reserve there are different kinds of wood: from turkey copses and abandoned chestnut woods to parts of more rare woodlands like oak woods with sessile oaks, turkey oaks and english oaks. Because of the extremely varied morphology there are many species of vegetation: linden and gentians, typical of the cold climates, and Mediterranean plants such as tree heath, service tree, whitebeam, Pyrus pyraster, hawthorn, sea buckthorn, laburnum and blackthorn. Even undergrowth plants can appear on this territory, including Malus florentina, Sorbus torminalis, medlar, hazelnuts and white alder.

In the groves there are downy oak, hornbeam, sessile oak, english oak, European hornbeam, Italian alder, wild cherry, hawthorn, privets and cornel, along with the rare Malus florentina. In the reserve there are numerous small rivers along which dogwoods, aspens, black poplar and willows grow. The areas used for agricultural purposes that can be found in the reserve contain some downy oaks which are over one hundred years old. Recently, in the most northern part of the Apennines, a colony of Scots pine has grown spontaneously. Another woodland habitat is occupied by the Italian maple, linden with heart-shaped leaves and oaks, while some zones are full of small-leaved lime, Italian maple, European hornbeam and Ostrya carpinifolia.

== Fauna ==
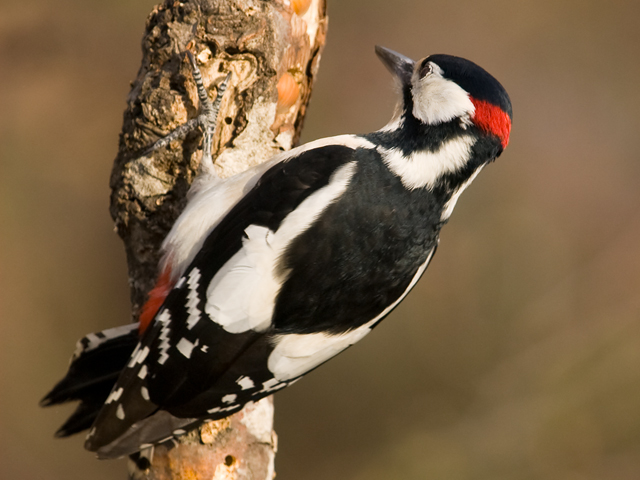
Great spotted woodpecker

This nature reserve hosts many species of birds and mammals, this thanks to its variegated landscape, which is composed of fields, meadows, hedgerows, shrublands and woods. In this area bird of prey (like short-toed snake eagle, northern goshawk, and hobby)live undisturbed; there are also fallow deer, roe deer and wild boar. The presence of these species helped to reintegrate the wolf. There is a particular interest in the study of bats, with Rhinolophus hipposideros, invertebrates and amphibians including the Italian crested newt, and some fishes like trout, and Telestes muticellus are studied.
