= Miguel Ángel Gilardi =

Argentine conductor (born 1949)

Miguel Ángel Gilardi (Buenos Aires, 1949) is an Argentine orchestra conductor. He has conducted throughout the world, recorded many concerts and received several awards, including the 2010 Premio Bicentenario.

== Education ==
Gilardi is the son of composer Gilardo Gilardi and María Lucrecia Madariaga. He completed his musical studies at the Manuel de Falla Superior Conservatory of Buenos Aires, from which he graduated with the gold medal. After becoming a stable member of the "Orquesta Estable del Teatro Colón" and the Buenos Aires Philharmonic Orquestra he was awarded a scholarship by Germany to study at the Superior School of Music in Cologne and the Rhin Conservatory and then by the "Mozarteum Argentino" to study at the academy and Conservatory of Saint Cecily of Rome.

== Trayectory ==
He has been Main Conductor of the following symphonic orchestras: "Tucumán" (Estable y de la UNT) "Rosario", "Nacional de Música Argentina", "Banda Sinfónica municipal de Buenos Aires", of the "Festival Internacional de Cascabel" in Brasil and the CCPA of Asunción del Paraguay. He has performed as Guest Conductor with the most important Argentine symphonic orchestras among them and in several occasions with the "Orquesta Sinfónica Nacional", the "Filarmónica de Buenos Aires" and the orchestra and choir "Estables del Teatro Argentino de La Plata".

He has also conducted in Germany, Austria, Brazil, Chile, Spain, the United States, Finland, France, Italy, Israel, Moldavia, Paraguay and Venezuela.

He has accompanied international soloists such as Boris Belkin, Rudolf Firkusny, Ruggiero Ricci, Barry Tuckwell among other and important Argentine soloists.

Linked to the Paris Sinfonietta since 1994 he has conducted several concerts in that city and the rest of France; specially symphonic-choral works such as Beethoven's Ninth Symphony, Requiem and great Mass in C by Mozart, Stabat Mater by Poulenc and Pergolesi, Fauré's Requiem and also premiered several works, mostly of Latin American and Argentine composers.

He has conducted opera and ballet with works by Menotti, Mozart, Pergolesi, Puccini, Purcell, Verdi, Delibes, Tchaikowski, Richard Strauss among others.

Professor specialized in Orchestra Conducting he dictates courses and seminars at universities in Argentina, Brazil, Paraguay and Venezuela. He is titular professor of Orchestra Conducting at the "Conservatorio Superior Manuel de Falla" of Buenos Aires and Main Conductor of said institute since 1984.

== Awards and distinctions ==
Among the awards he has received are: the "Municipalidad de Buenos Aires", "Joven Sobresaliente de la Argentina", Medal of the Pontificate of the Vatican City, Peire Foundation of Jerusalem, Rotary International, "Fondo Nacional de las Artes (Argentina)" and from the municipalities of Asunción in Paraguay, Cascabel in Brazil and Caracas in Venezuela. He received the "Premio Bicentenario" in the year 2010 from the city of Buenos Aires along with the soprano Gabriela Guzzo as performers of Argentine music with works by Alberto Ginastera.

== Discography and recordings ==
- Concert for violin and orchestra by Luis Szaran, vihn Phan on violin and the Paris Sinfonietta.
- Concert for violin and orchestra by Florentin Gimenez, Miguel Angel Echeverría on violin and the "Orquesta Sinfónica de Asunción del Paraguay".
- Mbocapú by Luis Szaran, "Orquesta Sinfónica de la Universidad Nacional de Tucumán".
- "Música latinoamericana para percusión", percussion ensemble of the "Conservatorio Manuel de Falla", Buenos Aires.
- He has made recordings for video, radio and television for Argentina, Brazil (the nine Beethoven symphonies for Curitiba TV), WDR of Germany, RAI of Rome and Sicily with the Moldavia National Orchestra, Helsinki National Radio and the Mikkeli Orchestra among the most distinguished ones.
