= Gilardo Gilardi Conservatory of Music =

Coordinates: 34.899°S 57.984°W

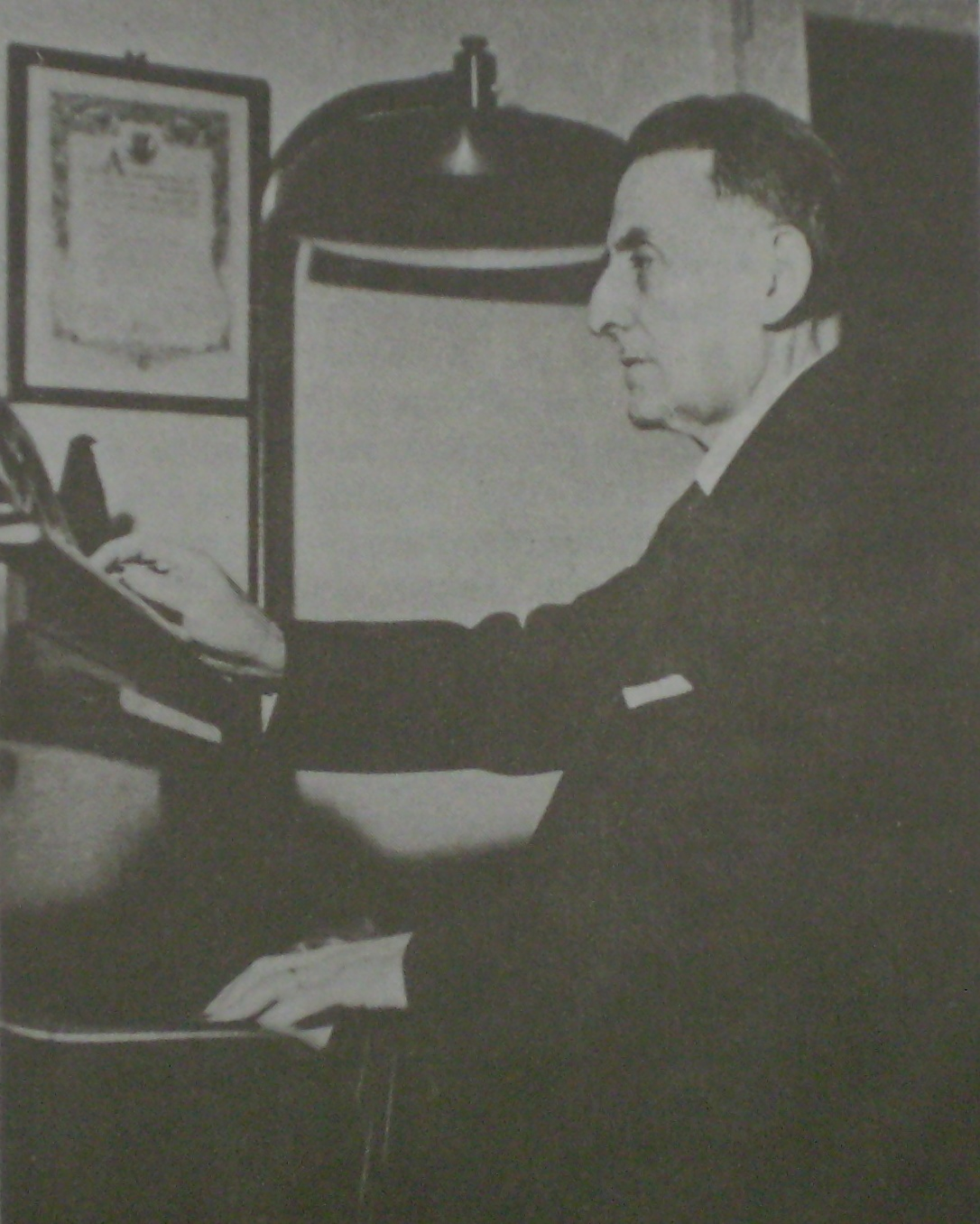
Gilardo Gilardi (1899—1963)

Gilardo Gilardi Conservarory of Music (Conservatorio de Música Gilardo Gilardi) is a music conservatory in La Plata, Argentina.

Founded as Conservatorio de Música y Arte Escénico (Conservatory of Music and Scenic Art) on 18 May 1949, this tertiary educational institution was the brainchild of the Argentine composer Alberto Ginastera. He envisaged a modern academy of musical studies that addressed both the professional and the artistic aspects of a musician's development. Argentine law 5322, approved on 29 October 1948 and promulgated on 23 November 1948, authorised its establishment and Ginastera became its first director. In 1960 it was suggested that the conservatory should be named in Ginastera's honour but convention was against honouring a living person. Consequently, when Gilardo Gilardi died in 1967, his name was adopted by the Conservatory.

Departments reflect every speciality of the orchestra. Courses are also offered through the faculties of pianoforte, guitar, singing, organ, conducting and music education. Diplomas are awarded for all levels of teaching in the educational system of Argentina.

== Facilities ==
Located in the city of La Plata near Buenos Aires the Conservatory is based in the Palacio Servente, designed by the architect Reynaldo Olivieri for Sociedad Femenil Italiana (the Italian Women's Society) as an orphanage. In 1999 the orphanage closed after 65 years because it failed to meet the requirements of United Nations' international Convention on the Rights of the Child.

The restored building is on three floors with forty classrooms, a 150-seat auditorium, a recording studio, a sound laboratory, an orchestra hall, a library, a reading room, and a cafeteria. The basement contains 19 of the classrooms including the percussion department, a cloakroom, maintenance workshops, the boiler, an archive and the general office. The ground floor is the main access level with a chapel converted for the performance of chamber music, the cafeteria, two recital rooms, the library, more classrooms and the audiovisual studio. The upper floor houses the auditorium, the sound laboratory (equipped with computers, synthesizer and digital piano), recording studio, multimedia control room, more offices, a kitchen, a hall for the wind and strings orchestras, access to the terrace, and six classrooms.

== Staff ==
- Director: Doctor Gerardo Guzmán
- Vice Director: Professor Silvia Lobato
- Studios Regent: Professor Diana di Giácomo
- Area Head: Professor Raúl Luis Zerbino
- Area Head: Professor Mónica Opanski
- Secretary: Professor Gastón Garrido
- Head of Tango: Professor Carlos Moscardini
