= List of compositions for viola: C to E =

This article lists compositions written for the viola. The list includes works in which the viola is a featured instrument: viola solo, viola and piano, viola and orchestra, ensemble of violas, etc. Catalogue number, date of composition and publisher (for copyrighted works) are also included. Ordering is by composer surname.

This pages lists composers whose surname falls into the C to E alphabetic range. For others, see respective pages:

- List of compositions for viola: A to B
- List of compositions for viola: F to H
- List of compositions for viola: I to K
- List of compositions for viola: L to N
- List of compositions for viola: O to R
- List of compositions for viola: S
- List of compositions for viola: T to Z

== C ==
- John Cage (1912–1992)

26'1.1499" for viola solo (1959); Henmar Press
59½ Seconds for viola solo (1953); Henmar Press
Dream for viola solo and ensemble of 4 violas (1948); Edition Peters

- Louis Calabro (1926–1991)

Double Concerto for viola, cello and orchestra (1986)
Ten Short Pieces (in First Position) for violin and viola; Elkan-Vogel; Theodore Presser Company
Variations for viola solo (1990)

- Leonhard von Call (1767?–1815)

Serenade in G major for flute, viola and guitar, Op. 14
Serenade in D major for flute, viola and guitar, Op. 30
Serenade in F major for flute, viola and guitar, Op. 47
Serenade in A minor for flute, viola and guitar, Op. 50
Serenade in C major for flute, viola and guitar, Op. 66
Serenade in A major for flute, viola and guitar, Op. 75
Serenade in C major for flute, viola and guitar, Op. 80
Serenade in A major for flute, viola and guitar, Op. 82
Serenade in G major for flute, viola and guitar, Op. 142

- Ann Callaway (b. 1949)

Chorale for viola solo (1993); J.B. Elkus Music; Subito Music

- Sergio Calligaris (b. 1941)

Sonata for viola and piano, Op. 39 (1997–1998); Carisch

- Ronald Caltabiano (b. 1959)

Character Sketch for viola solo (2002); Theodore Presser Company
Lyric Duo for viola and harp (1979); Theodore Presser Company

- Giuseppe Cambini (1746–1825)

Concerto in D major for viola and orchestra
6 Duos for flute and viola, Op. 4 (c.1775)
12 Duos concertants for 2 violas (1788); Gems Music Publications
6 Trios for flute, violin and viola, Op. 26

- Bartolomeo Campagnoli (1751–1827)

41 Caprices for viola solo, Op. 22 (c.1815)
12 Duets for 2 violas
6 Fugues for viola solo, Op. 10; arranged from violin solo by Giuseppe Alessandri
L'illusion de la viole d'amour: Sonate notturne for violin and viola, Op. 16 (1811)
6 Solos (Sonatas) for violin and cello or viola, Op. 6

- Conrado del Campo (1878–1953)

Pequeña pieza for viola and piano, Op. 6 (1906); Editorial de Música Española Contemporanea
Poema de los loores de María, Symphonic Poem for solo viola and orchestra (1944)
Romanza in F major for viola and piano, Op. 5 (1901); Editorial de Música Española Contemporanea
Suite for viola and small orchestra (1940)

- Frank Campo (b. 1927)

Canto Notturno for viola and percussion, Op. 69 (1984); Mitchell Peters
Elegy for viola and orchestra, Op. 112 (2002); Dario Music
Paesaggio for clarinet, viola and piano, Op. 95 (1994); Dario Music

- Nicola Campogrande (b. 1969)

Istruzioni per il cielo for clarinet, viola and piano (2010)
Ludwig van Gotlibovich for viola solo (2011)

- Christian Cannabich (1731–1798)

6 Duettos for violin and viola (1779)

- Pierre Capdevielle (1906–1969)

Sonata for viola and piano
Sonatina pastorale for flute and viola (1964); Éditions Françaises de Musique

- Lucien Capet (1873–1928)

Aria in A minor for violin, viola and piano, Op. 5 (1908)

- Mauro Cardi (b. 1955)

Al di sopra del lago è il vento for viola and piano (1993); Edizioni Nuova Fonit Cetra, Ricordi
La Follia for viola (and viola d'amore) and string orchestra (2017)
Lettura di un'onda for viola and guitar (1991); Edizioni Ricordi

- Robert Carl (b. 1954)

Excavating the Perfect Farewell for viola and piano (2003); American Composers Alliance
A Sampler of the Senses for viola, cello and piano (1994); American Composers Alliance

- David Carlson (b. 1952)

True Divided Light for viola and piano (2005); Carl Fischer; United Music Publishers

- Mark Carlson (b. 1952)

On the Coming of War, Sonata for viola and piano (2003); Pacific Serenades

- Edwin Carr (1926–2003)

Two Dances for viola and piano (1963); Australian Music Centre

- Paul Carr (b. 1961)

Viola Air for viola and string orchestra (2007); Goodmusic

- Richard Carrick (b. 1971)

Shadow Flow for viola solo (2007); Schott Music; Project Schott New York
Shadow Fragments for viola solo (2006)

- Julián Carrillo (1875–1965)

Capricho en 4°, 8° y 16° de tono (Capriccio in 1/4, 1/8 and 1/16 Tones) for viola solo; Ediciones Mexicanas de Música
Concurso for viola and piano (1908)
Cuatro casi sonatas para viola sola (Almost Four Sonatas) for viola solo (1961)
Tres sonatas para viola en cuartos de tono (Three Sonatas in Quarter Tones) for viola solo (1930)

- Adam Carse (1878–1958)

Bourree in C for 2 violins and viola
A Breezy Story in G major for viola and piano (published 1932); Stainer & Bell
Calm Reflection in G major for viola and piano (published 1932); Stainer & Bell
Gently Swaying for viola and piano
Heartache in A minor for viola and piano (published 1932); Stainer & Bell
Thoughtfulness in C major for viola and piano (published 1932); Augener

- Elliott Carter (1908–2012)

Au Quai for bassoon and viola (2002); Boosey & Hawkes
Elegy for viola and piano (1943, revised 1961); Peer Music
Figment IV for viola solo (2007); Boosey & Hawkes
Pastoral for viola and piano (1945); Merion Music

- Ferdinando Carulli (1770–1841)

2 Duetti for viola and guitar, Op. 137

- Benet Casablancas (b. 1956)

Peça... De música d'un ballet for viola solo (1980); Clivis Publicacions
Poema for viola (or clarinet) and piano (1996); La Mà de Guido

- Henri Casadesus (1879–1947)

Concerto in B minor "in the Style of George Frideric Handel" for viola and orchestra (published 1924)
Concerto in C minor "in the Style of Johann Christian Bach" for viola and orchestra (published 1947)

- Robert Casadesus (1899–1972)

Sonata for viola and piano, Op. 12 (1928); International Music Company

- Philip Cashian (b. 1963)

The Dark Horsemen and Other Tales for soprano and viola (1996); British Music Information Centre
The Devil's Box for clarinet, viola and piano (1999); British Music Information Centre
Jarl for viola solo (2002); British Music Information Centre

- John Casken (b. 1949)

Farness for soprano, solo viola and chamber orchestra (2006); Schott Music

- Joseph Castaldo (1927–2000)

Chamber Sonata for violin and viola; manuscript
Concerto for viola and orchestra (1988–1989)
1. Lament
2. Canticle-Celebration

- Mario Castelnuovo-Tedesco (1895–1968)

Sonata in C minor for viola and cello, Op. 144 (1950); Affiliated Musicians
Sonata for violin and viola, Op. 127 (1945); Theodore Presser Company
Suite 508: Greeting Cards for viola and piano, Op. 170 No. 21 (1960)

- Jacques Castérède (1926–2014)

Sonata for viola and piano (1968); Éditions Choudens
Les Heures Calmes, 3 Pieces for 1, 2 and 3 violas (1987); Éditions JM Fuzeau

- Eugenio Cavallini (1806–1881)

Divertimento in G major for viola solo and string quartet (or string orchestra) (1829)
Guida per lo studio della viola (Viola Method), Book II: 24 Studi in tuoni minori (24 Studies in Minor Keys) for viola solo (c.1845)
Guida per lo studio della viola (Viola Method), Book III: Concert Pieces for viola and piano (c.1845)
1. Fantasia
2. Souvenir
3. Fantasia originale (a.k.a. Fantasia) for viola and piano (or 2 violas, 2 cellos and double bass)
4. Tema con Variazioni
5. Polacca
6. Fantasia originale
7. Tema Variato (Theme and Variations) in E♭ major
8. Adagio Variato dell'Opera Poliuto
9. Serenata
Riminiscenze di Santa Cristina, Fantasy for solo viola, 2 violas, 2 cellos and double bass (published c.1860)

- Jeremy Cavaterra (b. 1971)

Sonata for violin and viola (2007)
Trio for flute, viola and harp (2012)

- Norman Cazden (1914–1980)

Chamber Sonata No. 2 for viola solo, Op. 17 No. 2 (1938)
Chamber Sonata No. 3 for clarinet and viola, Op. 17 No. 3 (1938)
Concerto for viola and orchestra, Op. 103a (1972); MCA; Belwin Mills
The Lass of Glenshee from Three Ballads from the Catskills for viola and chamber orchestra, Op. 52 (1956); Composers Facsimile Edition; MCA; Belwin Mills
Sonata for viola and piano, Op. 104a (1974); Andrews Music House, Bangor
Three Recitations for cello (or viola) and piano, Op. 24 (1941); Andrews Music House, Bangor; Composers Facsimile Edition

- Monic Cecconi-Botella (b. 1936)

Cérémonie for viola and piano; Collection Panorama: Œuvres Contemporaines, Volume 3; Éditions Gérard Billaudot

- Alexandre Eugène Cellier (1883–1968)

Sonate en sol bémol majeur (Sonata in G♭ Major) for viola and piano (1923); Éditions M. Senart

- Friedrich Cerha (1926–2023)

Alles Licht for tenor and viola (1988–1989); Doblinger
Concerto for viola and orchestra (1993); Universal Edition
Sonata for viola and guitar (or lute) (1951); Doblinger
Sonata for viola and piano (1951); Doblinger

- Jordi Cervelló (1935–2022)

Cant nocturn for viola and orchestra (1991); Catalana d'Edicions Musicals
Entre deux for viola and cello (2011); Editorial de Música Boileau
Íscor for violin and viola (1999); Editorial de Música Boileau
Llegenda for viola solo (2000); Editorial de Música Boileau
Souvenir for viola solo (2000); Editorial de Música Boileau
Sonata per a viola (Sonata for Viola) (2000); Editorial de música española contemporanea
Tertis Sonata for viola and piano (2012); Editorial de Música Boileau
Tre pensieri for viola and piano (2009); Editorial de Música Boileau

- Jacques Chailley (1910–1999)

Improvisation à deux for violin and viola (1949); Éditions Alphonse Leduc
Prélude et allegro for viola and cello (1977); Éditions Alphonse Leduc
Premiers concerts: 12 morceaux faciles d'après les "Exercices divertissants" de Marie-Thérèse Chailley (First Concerts: 12 Easy Pieces after "Exercices Divertissants" by Marie-Thérèse Chailley) for violin (or viola) and piano (1974); Éditions Alphonse Leduc
Sonata for viola and piano (1939–1941); Éditions Alphonse Leduc

- Henri Challan (1910–1977)

Diptyque for viola and piano (1961); Éditions Alphonse Leduc

- Ka Nin Chan (b. 1949)

The Charmer for viola solo and 2 percussion (1994)
Gibora, Concerto for viola and orchestra (1997)
Musical Offering for 2 violas (1994)
Soulmate for solo viola (2001); Canadian Music Centre

- Chan Wing-wah (b. 1954)

Scherzo for viola and piano (1978)
Summer Day (夏日) for oboe, viola and cello (2000)

- Agustí Charles (b. 1960)

Cielo de Ceniza for mezzo-soprano, viola and chamber ensemble (1995); words by Federico García Lorca
Laments for alto, viola and chamber ensemble (1991); words by Federico García Lorca
Lointain intérieur, Double Concerto for violin and viola with 6 female voices and orchestra (1991–1992)

- Jacques Charpentier (1933–2017)

Chant bref for viola and piano; Collection Panorama: Œuvres Contemporaines, Volume 3 (1989); Éditions Gérard Billaudot
Couleurs pour une sonate imaginaire (Colors for an Imaginary Sonata) for viola and piano (1991); Éditions Alphonse Leduc; United Music Publishers

- Stephen Chatman (b. 1950)

Northern Drones for viola and off-stage percussion (1976); Canadian Music Centre
Varley Suite for viola solo (2005); Highgate Press; ECS Publishing; Canadian Music Centre

- Ernest Chausson (1855–1899)

Pièce for viola and piano, Op. 39 (1897); Éditions Salabert

- Carlos Chávez (1899–1978)

Madrigal for viola and piano (1921); Carlanita Music Company; G. Schirmer
Soli III for bassoon, trumpet, viola, timpani and orchestra (1965); Mills Music

- Charles Chaynes (1925–2016)

Alternances for viola and piano (1966); Alphonse Leduc

- Shih-Hui Chen (b. 1962)

Remembrance (思想起中提琴協奏曲 Shu Shon Key) for viola and chamber orchestra or chamber ensemble (2006); Trigon Music Press

- Chen Yi (b. 1953)

Happy Tune (欢乐歌) for violin and viola (2018); Theodore Presser
Memory (思念) for viola solo (2010); original for violin solo; Theodore Presser
Xian Shi (弦诗, "String Poem"), Tone Poem for viola and orchestra (1983); Theodore Presser Company

- Brian Cherney (b. 1942)

Beyond the Seventh Palace for viola and percussion (1982); Canadian Music Centre
Chamber Concerto for viola and 10 players (1975); Canadian Music Centre
In Stillness Ascending for viola and piano (1986); McGill; Canadian Music Centre
Music for a Summer Wedding for flute, viola and harp (2000–2002); Canadian Music Centre
Seven Miniatures in the Form of a Mobile for viola solo (1978); Canadian Music Centre
Shekhinah for viola solo (1988); Doberman-Yppan
Trois petites pièces désséchées... En forme de sandwich for viola and piano (1979); Brian Cherney

- Luciano Chessa (b. 1971)

Cinabro for viola and piano (2006)

- Camille Chevillard (1859–1923)

Introduction et marche for viola and piano, Op. 22 (published 1905); Costallat & Cie.
Quatre pièces (4 Pieces) for viola and piano, Op. 4 (1887); Enoch & Compagnie

- Hideki Chihara (b. 1957)

Saimon (祭文; Eulogy) for viola and piano

- Paul Chihara (b. 1938)

Concerto "JFK: Requiescat in pace" for viola and orchestra (1963)
Duo Concertante for violin and viola (1989); Henmar Press; C.F. Peters
Redwood for viola and percussion (1968); Protone Music; C.F. Peters
Sonata "De Profundis" for viola and piano (1994, 2009); C.F. Peters
Songs of Love and Loss for solo viola and choir (2001); C.F. Peters
Tree Music for 3 violas and 3 trombones (1966)
When Soft Voices Die, Concerto for viola and orchestra (2008); C.F. Peters

- Barney Childs (1926–2000)

The Day Sequence: 1 for viola and piano (1969); American Composers Alliance
Interbalances II for viola and another instrument (1961); American Composers Alliance
Music for One Player (1967); American Composers Alliance
Sonata for solo viola (1956); American Composers Alliance

- Erik Chisholm (1904–1965)

Sonata for viola solo; Scottish Music Centre

- Geghuni Chitchyan (b. 1929)

Sonata for viola and piano (1986); Sovetsky Kompozitor

- Gian Paolo Chiti (b. 1939)

Rime for medium voice, viola and piano (1998)
Sur le bois oubliés for viola solo, Op. 100 (1995); Musik Fabrik France
Viorgan for viola and organ (2007); Musik Fabrik France

- Osvald Chlubna (1893–1971)

Fantasie in C minor for viola and orchestra, Op. 44 (1936); Český Hudební Fond
Fantasie for violin and viola, Op. 71 (1949)
Invence (Invention) for viola solo (1962); Panton
Sonatina for viola and piano, Op. 119; Český Hudební Fond

- Fabio Cifariello Ciardi (b. 1960)

Pa(e/s)saggi for viola, live electronics and multi-track tape (2000)

- Maia Ciobanu (b. 1952)

Decor IV for clarinet and viola (2003)
NR.273,16: Intersecţii (Crossroads) for saxophone, viola and live electronics (2007)

- Seán Clancy (b. 1984)

Jórvík, Lines Linking Disparate Sites, Lines of Information for violin and viola (2008)
Ursatz, Music by Numbers II for viola solo (2010); Contemporary Music Centre Ireland

- F. R. C. Clarke (1931–2009)

My Beloved Spake, Song for alto, viola and piano (1985); Canadian Music Centre
Reverie and Rondo for clarinet, viola and piano (1993); Canadian Music Centre
Sonata for viola and piano (1988); Canadian Music Centre
Suite for violin and viola (1982, 1987); original version for flute and clarinet; Canadian Music Centre

- James Clarke (b. 1957)

Isolation for violin or viola solo (1997)

- Nigel Clarke (b. 1960)

Flashpoint for viola solo, Op. 8 (1990, revised 2009); Maecenas Music; Edition Peters
Rain Dance for viola solo, Op. 7 (1990, revised 2009); Edition Peters

- Rebecca Clarke (1886–1979)

Dumka, Duo Concertante for violin, viola and piano (1940–1941); Oxford University Press
I'll Bid My Heart Be Still (Old Scotch Border Melody) for viola and piano (1944); Oxford University Press
Lullaby for viola and piano (1909); Oxford University Press
Lullaby (An Arrangement of an Ancient Irish Tune) for viola and piano (1913); Oxford University Press
Morpheus for viola and piano (1917–1918); Oxford University Press
Passacaglia on an Old English Tune for viola and piano (1941?); Oxford University Press
Prelude, Allegro and Pastorale for clarinet and viola (1941); Oxford University Press
Sonata for viola and piano (1919); Chester Music
Two Pieces (Lullaby and Grotesque) for viola and cello (1916?); Oxford University Press

- Rhona Clarke (b. 1958)

The Waterford Suite: Jealous Pursuit for viola and piano (1997); Contemporary Music Centre Ireland

- Ann Cleare (b. 1983)

Dysmorphia for viola and cello (2008); Contemporary Music Centre Ireland
IRK for viola and optional live electronics (2006); also for violin; Contemporary Music Centre Ireland

- Andrea Clearfield (b. 1960)

…and low to the lake falls home for flute, viola and harp (2009); Angelfire Press
Convergence for viola and piano (2008); Angelfire Press

- Aldo Clementi (1925–2011)

Variazioni (Variations) for viola solo (1979); Edizioni Suvini Zerboni
Capriccio for viola and 24 instruments (1979–1980); Edizioni Suvini Zerboni

- Eric Coates (1886–1957)

Ballad in G major for viola and piano, Op. 13 (1906); published in A Second Lionel Tertis Album; Josef Weinberger
First Meeting, Souvenir for viola and piano (1941); Chappell Music; Josef Weinberger (A Lionel Tertis Album)

- Gloria Coates 1938–2023)

In the Mt. Tremper Zen Monastery for percussion, harp and viola (1992)
Lichtsplitter for flute, viola and harp (1988); also a version for flute, viola, harp and percussion
Phantasie über "Wie schön leuchtet der Morgenstern" (Fantasy on "May the Morningstar Rise" ["How Lovely Shines the Morningstar"]) for amplified viola and organ (1974)

- Bob Cobert (1924–2020)

Concert Piece for viola and small orchestra (1992)
Contrasts for viola and cello (2001)
Music for Only One Lonely Viola for viola solo (2003); American Viola Society Publications
Three Moods for Two Violas for 2 violas (2001); American Viola Society Publications

- Robert Cogan (1930–2021)

Events Dancing, Open-ended Folio for viola and piano (1989); Sonic Design
Sonata for viola and piano (1953); Independent Music Publishers

- Gerald Cohen (b. 1960)

Aria and Scherzo for violin and viola (1994); Oxford University Press
Trio for viola, cello and piano (1999); Oxford University Press
Yedid nefesh, Trio for clarinet, viola and piano (2007)

- James Cohn (1928–2021)

Duo in C for violin and viola (1952)
Sonata for viola and piano (1987)

- Reine Colaço Osorio-Swaab (1881–1971)

Sonata No. 3 for viola and piano (1952); Donemus
Tsaddiék, Intermezzo for viola and piano (1953); Donemus

- Jonathan Cole (b. 1970)

Brood for clarinet and viola (2002); G. Ricordi London
Simulacrum for viola solo (2008)

- Dan Coleman (b. 1972)

Dezembrum for viola and cello (1992)
Poem at Night for viola and piano (1992)
Summer for viola and piano (2003)

- Paul Coletti (b. 1959)

"D" luscious for viola solo (2008, revised 2016)
Fantasia for viola solo (2015)
Journey for 2 violas (2006)
3 Pieces for viola and piano (1993–2002); Oxford University Press
Requiem for viola solo (2016)
Voyage for viola solo (2003, revised 2016)

- Michael Colgrass (1932–2019)

Chaconne for viola and orchestra (1984); Carl Fischer
New People, 7 Songs for mezzo-soprano, viola and piano (1969); MCA Music; Carl Fischer
Strangers: Irreconcilable Variations for clarinet, viola and piano (1986); Carl Fischer
Variations for Four Drums and Viola (1957); Music for Percussion

- Johannes Colizzi (c.1742–1808)

3 Sonatas for viola and harpsichord or piano, Op. 4 (1778)

- Henri Collet (1885–1951)

Rapsodie Castillane for viola and orchestra, Op. 73 No. 2 (1923); Éditions Maurice Senart

- Anthony Collins (1893–1963)

Romney Marsh for viola and orchestra (1944); Novello & Co.

- Guillaume Connesson (b. 1970)

Constellation de la Couronne australe (Constellation Corona Australis) for viola and orchestra (or piano) (2008); Éditions Gérard Billaudot
Constellation de la Couronne boréale (Constellation Corona Borealis) for viola and piano (2005); Éditions Gérard Billaudot; United Music Publishers
Constellations, Concerto for viola and orchestra (2009); Éditions Gérard Billaudot

- Justin Connolly (1933–2020)

Anima for viola and orchestra, Op. 27 (1974); Novello & Co.
Celebratio super Ter in lyris Leo for 3 violas and accordion, Op. 29/II (1994–1995); Novello & Co.
Celebratio per viola sola, Op. 29/IV (2005); Novello & Co.
Poems of Wallace Stevens IV for mezzo-soprano, viola and piano, Op. 38 (1992); Novello & Co.
Triad I for trumpet, viola and piano, Op. 2 (1964); Novello & Co.
Triad III for oboe, viola and cello, Op. 8 (1966); Novello & Co.
Triad VI for viola, piano and tape, Op. 21 (1974); lost

- Marius Constant (1925–2004)

Recitativo for viola solo (1983); Éditions Salabert

- Paul Constantinescu (1909–1963)

Sonata bizantină for viola or cello solo (1943); Editura Muzicală, Bucharest

- Dinos Constantinides (1929–2021)

At the Village for oboe (or clarinet or viola) and piano (1980); Magni Publications
Fantasia for viola solo (1982); Conners Publications
Fantasia for Stelios and Yiannis for violin and viola (2009); Magni Publications
Four Interludes for viola solo (1991); Conners Publications
Grecian Variations for viola and string orchestra (1987) or piano (1991); Magni Publications
Greek Dance, Trio for flute, viola and guitar (or for 2 violins and viola) (1970); Cimarron Music and Reproductions (Whaling Music Publishers)
Reflections II for voice and viola (1982); words by Elizabeth Barrett Browning; Magni Publications
Sonata for viola and piano (1971); Seesaw Music Corporation

- Sylvia Constantinidis (b. 1962)

Sunrise for viola and piano, Op. 22 (2002)

- Barry Conyngham (b. 1944)

Streams for flute, viola and harp (1988); Australian Music Centre
Viola for viola solo (1981); Universal Edition; Australian Music Centre
Waterways for viola and orchestra (1990); Universal Edition; Australian Music Centre

- Arnold Cooke (1906–2005)

Duo for violin and viola (1935); Anglo-American Music Publishers
Little Suite for flute and viola (1957); Anglo-American Music Publishers
Sonata in F major for viola and piano (1936–1937); Oxford University Press; Anglo-American Music Publishers

- Carlton Cooley (1898–1981)

Aria and Dance for viola and orchestra (1965?)
Concertino for viola and orchestra (1937); Dimit Edition; Henri Elkan Music Publishers
Etude Suite for viola solo (1962); Henri Elkan Music Publishers
Scale Studies for Viola (1964); Henri Elkan Music Publishers
A Song and Dance for viola and piano (1927); Éditions Maurice Senart

- Carson Cooman (b. 1982)

Aquarius Chaconnes (Birthday Music for Marisa) for viola and organ, Op. 471 (2002); Parsonage Press; Subito Music Corporation
Cavatina for viola and piano, Op. 776 (2008); Musik Fabrik
2 Lullabies for viola and trombone (or cello), Op. 654 (2005); Musik Fabrik
Planctus for viola solo, Op. 665 (2005); Musik Fabrik
Showings of Divine Love, Dramatic Sacred Tableaux for viola and organ, Op. 459 (2002); Parsonage Press; Subito Music Corporation

- Paul Cooper (1926–1996)

Canons d'Amour for violin and viola (1981); G. Schirmer
Canti for viola and piano (1981); G. Schirmer
Descants for viola and orchestra (1975); G. Schirmer
Double Concerto for violin, viola and orchestra (1985); G. Schirmer
Homage for flute, trumpet, viola and orchestra (1976); G. Schirmer
A Shenandoah for Charles Ives's Birthday for flute, trumpet, viola and orchestra (1974); G. Schirmer
Symphony No. 4 "Landscape" for flute, trumpet, viola and orchestra (1973); G. Schirmer
Variants II for viola and piano (1972); Chester Music; G. Schirmer
Verses for violin and viola (1991); G. Schirmer

- Aaron Copland (1900–1990)

Alone for voice, viola and piano (1921)
Elegies for violin and viola (1932)

- Claude Coppens (b. 1936)

Une Semaine de Bonté for viola solo (1985); CeBeDeM

- Giampaolo Coral (1944–2011)

Huldigung (Homage) for viola and cello (1983); Edizioni Curci

- Frank Corcoran (b. 1944)

Quasi Variations on 'A Mháirín de Bharra' for viola solo (2004); Contemporary Music Centre Ireland

- Roque Cordero (1917–2008)

Concertino for viola and string orchestra (1968)
Tres Mensajes Breves (3 Brief Messages) for viola and piano (1970); Peer Music Classical

- Azio Corghi (1937–2022)

Actus II for viola and piano (1976); Edizioni Suvini Zerboni
Tang'jok(her) for viola solo (2008); G. Ricordi Milan

- John Corigliano (b. 1938)

Fancy on a Bach Air for viola solo (1996); G. Schirmer

- Michel Corrette (1707–1795)

Sonata in B♭ major for viola and basso continuo (1773)

- Eleanor Cory (b. 1943)

Interviews for viola and piano (1996); American Composers Alliance

- Mónica Cosachov (b. 1946)

Juegos for viola and piano (1980)
Ganas de tango for viola and piano (1982)

- Jean Coulthard (1908–2000)

The Bird of Dawning Singeth All Night Long for flute, viola and guitar (1983); Canadian Music Centre
Meditation and Three Dances for viola and string orchestra (1988); Canadian Music Centre
Music for Midsummer, Trios for soprano, viola and piano (1970); Canadian Music Centre
Sonata Rhapsody for viola and piano (1962); Canadian Music Centre
Songs of a Dreamer for soprano and viola (1982); Canadian Music Centre
Symphonic Ode for viola and orchestra (1977); Canadian Music Centre
When Music Sounds for viola and piano (1986); Canadian Music Centre

- François Couperin (1668–1733)

La Bandoline from Pièces de clavecin, 1er livre (published 1713); transcription for viola and piano by Tibor Serly (1947)

- Henry Cowell (1897–1965)

Hymn and Fuguing Tune No. 7 for viola and piano, HC 710 (1946); Peermusic Classical
Variations on Thirds for 2 violas and string orchestra, HC 882 (1960); Edition Peters
Viola Song for viola and piano (1918–1919)

- Cindy Cox (b. 1961)

Turner for viola and piano (2008); World a Tuning Fork Press

- Jean Cras (1879–1932)

L'âme (The Soul), Second Sonata for viola and piano (1900)

- John Craton (b. 1953)

Mongolian Folk Songs for viola and chamber orchestra (2003); Wolfhead Music
Six Easy Pieces for viola (in first position) and piano (2013); Wolfhead Music

- Paul Creston (1906–1985)

Suite for viola and piano, Op. 13 (1938); Shawnee Press
Homage for viola and string orchestra, Op. 41 (1947); Shawnee Press
Suite for flute, viola and piano, Op. 56 (1953); Shawnee Press

- Gordon Crosse (1937–2021)

Concerto for viola and string orchestra with horn (2009)

- Stephen Crowe (b. 1979)

Shirtless Buff Swan, Viola Concerto (2014)
Toffee Cock for viola solo (2013)

- Adrian Cruft (1921–1987)

Impromptu in B♭ major for viola (or clarinet) and piano, Op. 22 (published 1957); Joseph Williams; Chappell Music; Joad Press
Romance for viola and piano, Op. 13 (published 1957); Joseph Williams; Joad Press

- George Crumb (1929–2022)

Sonata for viola and piano (1953)

- Zulema de la Cruz (b. 1958)

Danzas Galegas (Galician Dances) for viola solo (2003); Editorial Alpuerto

- Robert Cuckson (b. 1942)

Adagio for viola and piano (1961); Australian Music Centre
Ayre for viola
Quetzalcoatl for flute and viola (1970); Australian Music Centre

- Dimitrie Cuclin (1885–1978)

Etude-Sonata for 2 violas (1960); Uniunea Bucharest

- Edric Cundell (1893–1961)

Rhapsody for viola (or cello) and piano (c.1920); W. Paxton & Co.

- Douglas J. Cuomo (b. 1958)

A Far Playground for viola and piano (2009); Schott Helicon Music; Project Schott New York

- Henrique de Curitiba (1934–2008)

Cornell Impressions, 4 Short Pieces for viola and piano (1979)

- Sebastian Currier (b. 1959)

Pulse for viola and guitar (2002)
Uncertainties for viola and piano (1993); C. Fischer

- Joe Cutler (b. 1968)

Concerto for viola and string orchestra (2008)
Five Mobiles after Alexander Calder for soprano saxophone (or clarinet), viola and piano (2000); British Music Information Centre
Gaïa for viola solo (1993); British Music Information Centre
Music for Sunflowers for viola and string orchestra (2009)

- Benjamin Cutter (1857–1910)

Eine Liebes-Novelle (A Love Story), 5 Bagatelles for viola and piano, Op. 20 (1894); Arthur P. Schmidt, Boston; American Viola Society Publications

== D ==
- Jean Daetwyler (1907–1994)

Concerto for viola and orchestra (1979)

- Jörgen Dafgård (b. 1964)

For the Sleeping: Dream Sonata for viola and tape (1997–1998)
Frames and Flow, 6 Duets for violin, viola and cello (1988–2000); Nos. 1 and 3 for viola and cello; Nos. 2 and 5 for violin and viola; STIM; Swedish Music Information Centre

- Roland Dahinden (b. 1962)

broken lines for viola and electronics (2004)
the leaf for female voice, viola and electronics (2005)
lichtung kiel for viola and live electronics (1999)

- Ingolf Dahl (1912–1970)

Divertimento for viola and piano (1948); Theodore Presser Company

- Marc-André Dalbavie (b. 1961)

Diadèmes for viola solo, instrumental ensemble and electronic ensemble (1986); Éditions Jobert
Petit interlude for viola and piano (1992); Éditions Gérard Billaudot

- Martin Dalby (1942–2018)

Scotch Rhapsody for viola and piano (1983); Novello & Co.
Concerto for viola and orchestra (1974); Novello & Co.

- Benjamin Dale (1885–1943)

Come Away, Death in D♭ major for low voice, viola and piano; No. 2 from Two Songs from Shakespeare, Op. 9 (1919); words from William Shakespeare's Twelfth Night
English Dance for viola and piano (1916); arranged for viola and piano by York Bowen; Comus Edition
Introduction and Andante for 6 violas, Op. 5 (1911, revised 1913); Corda Music Publications
Phantasy in D minor for viola and piano, Op. 4 (1909); Edition Schott
Suite in D major for viola and piano, Op. 2 (1906); Novello & Co.
1. Maestoso – Allegretto espressivo
2. Romance (also for viola and orchestra)
3. Allegro (also for viola and orchestra)

- Fridolin Dallinger (1933–2020)

Sonata for viola and piano (1965); Verlag Doblinger

- Jean-Michel Damase (1928–2013)

Aria for cello (or viola) and piano, Op. 7 (1949); Éditions Salabert; United Music Publishers
Concerto for viola, harp and string orchestra (1990); Éditions Henry Lemoine
Épigraphe for viola and piano (1991); Éditions Gérard Billaudot; United Music Publishers
Hallucinations for viola and harp; Harposphère
Intermède for viola and piano (1990); Editions Combre; United Music Publishers
Ostinato for viola and piano (1991); Éditions Gérard Billaudot; United Music Publishers
Trio for flute, viola and harp (1947); Éditions Henry Lemoine

- Leopold Damrosch (1832–1885)

Liebesgesang (Love Song), Notturno for viola and piano (published 1888); transcription by Hermann Ritter

- Jules Danbé (1840–1905)

Villanelle in C minor for viola and piano, Op. 14b (1874, 1877); original for violin and piano

- Richard Danielpour (b. 1956)

Come Up from the Fields Father for baritone, viola and piano (2008); words by Walt Whitman; Lean Kat Music

- Franz Danzi (1763–1826)

3 Duos for viola and cello (Book 1)
3 Duos for viola and cello (Book 2), Op. 9

- Jean-Luc Darbellay (b. 1946)

À Deux (For Two) for horn or bassethorn and viola (1999)
Asia for flute, viola and harp (2008); Tre Media Musikverlage
BACH for viola solo (2008); Tre Media Musikverlage
Chant d'adieux (Song of Farewell) for violin and viola (2000); Tre Media Musikverlage
Dos Olivos for singing violinist and viola (2001)
Questions pour un millénaire (Questions for a Millennium) for violin and viola (also recitating) (2001)

- Alexander Dargomyzhsky (1813–1869)

Elegy (Элегия) for viola and piano (1844); transcription by Vadim Borisovsky (1949); original Не спрашивай, зачем: Элегия (Do Not Ask Why) for voice and piano with words by Alexander Pushkin; Muzgiz; Gosudarstvennoe muzykalnoe izdatelstvo (State Music Publishing House)
She Is Coming (Она придёт: Элегиа), Elegy for voice, viola (or cello) and piano (1843); words by Nikolay Yazykov

- Christian Darnton (1905–1981)

Concerto for viola and string orchestra (1933–1935)

- Vladimir Dashkevich (b. 1934)

Concerto No. 1 (Альтовый концерт №1) for viola and orchestra (2007)
Concerto No. 2 (Альтовый концерт №2) for viola and orchestra (2007)
Sonata in Three Movements (Соната в трех частях) for viola and piano (2004)

- Michael Daugherty (b. 1954)

Diamond in the Rough for violin, viola and percussion (2006); Boosey & Hawkes
Viola Zombie for 2 violas (1991); Peermusic Classical

- Félicien-César David (1810–1876)

La Nuit, Thème de l'ode-symphonie "Le désert" for viola and piano (1844); transcription of "Hymne à la nuit" by Henri Vieuxtemps (c.1846); original for tenor and orchestra

- Ferdinand David (1810–1873)

Concertino in B♭ major for bassoon or viola and orchestra, Op. 12 (published 1840)

- Gyula Dávid (1913–1977)

A rózsalángolás (The Burning Rose), Chamber Music for female voice, flute and viola (1966); words by István Vas; Editio Musica Budapest
Concerto for viola and orchestra (1950); Editio Musica Budapest
Pezzo (Piece) for viola and piano (1974); Editio Musica Budapest
Sonatina for viola and piano (1969); Editio Musica Budapest

- Johann Nepomuk David (1895–1977)

Melancholia for viola and chamber orchestra, Op. 53 (1958); Breitkopf und Härtel
Sonata in B♭ major for clarinet and viola, Op. 32 No. 4 (1948); Breitkopf und Härtel
Sonata for flute and viola, Op. 32 No. 1 (1943); Breitkopf und Härtel
Sonata for viola solo, Op. 31 No. 3 (1947); Breitkopf und Härtel

- Thomas Christian David (1925–2006)

Concerto Grosso for 2 violas, cello and double bass with string orchestra (1978)
Duo-Sonata No. 1 for violin and viola (1980); Verlag Doblinger
Sonata for cello (or viola) and guitar (1980); Verlag Doblinger
Sonatina for flute and viola (1958); Verlag Doblinger
Variationen über ein deutsches Volkslied (Variations on a German Folk Song) for viola and positive organ (1966); Verlag Doblinger

- Brent Michael Davids (b. 1959)

Viola Jokes for tenor and viola (2005)

- Robert Davidson (b. 1965)

Adeney cycle for violin and viola (1990); Australian Music Centre
Arch, Canon for 3 violas or solo viola with prerecorded accompaniment (1992); Australian Music Centre
Lento for viola and piano (1997); Australian Music Centre
Message ground, Canon for 2 violas or solo viola and digital delay with accompaniment (1996); Australian Music Centre
Spiral, Canon for 3 violas or volo viola with digital delay or prerecorded accompaniment (2000); Australian Music Centre

- Peter Maxwell Davies (1934–2016)

Birthday Music for John for flute, viola and cello, Op. 109 (1983); Chester Music
The Door of the Sun for viola solo, J. 132, Op. 64 (1975); Boosey & Hawkes
Midhouse Air for violin and viola, Op. 180a (1996); Chester Music
6 Sorano Variants for viola solo, Op. 320 (2012); Boosey & Hawkes
Strathclyde Concerto No. 5 for violin, viola and string orchestra, J. 245, Op. 151 (1991); Boosey & Hawkes

- Tansy Davies (b. 1973)

Small Black Stone for viola and piano (2000); British Music Information Centre
Trio for clarinet, viola and piano (2002); British Music Information Centre

- Donald R. Davis (b. 1957)

No Exit (Huis Clos) for flute, viola and harp (1996); Fatrock Ink

- Jon Deak (b. 1943)

Eyeore Has a Birthday for viola, double bass and piano (1991); Carl Fischer
Metaphor for viola solo/narrator (1980, 1991); original for cello solo/narrator; Carl Fischer
The Snow Queen for narrator, viola, double bass and orchestra (1991); story by Hans Christian Andersen; Carl Fischer

- Brett Dean (b. 1961)

Concerto for viola and orchestra (2004); Bote & Bock; Boosey & Hawkes
Intimate Decisions for solo viola (1996); Bote & Bock; Boosey & Hawkes
Night Window, Music for clarinet, viola and piano (1993); Bote & Bock; Boosey & Hawkes
One of a Kind for viola and tape (1998, 2012); Bote & Bock; Boosey & Hawkes
Skizzen für Siegbert (Sketches for Siegbert) for viola solo (2011); Bote & Bock; Boosey & Hawkes
some birthday... for 2 violas and cello (1992); Bote & Bock; Boosey & Hawkes
Testament for 12 violas (2002); Bote & Bock; Boosey & Hawkes
Wendezeit (Homage to F.C.) for 5 violas (1988); Bote & Bock; Boosey & Hawkes

- Raymond Deane (b. 1953)

A Baroque Session (with Carolan and Friends) for violin, viola, cello and string orchestra (2009); Ireland Contemporary Music Centre
Brève for viola solo (2003); Ireland Contemporary Music Centre
Concursus for violin, viola and string orchestra (2004); Ireland Contemporary Music Centre
Hungarian Jewish Melodies for violin, viola, cello and string orchestra (2007); Ireland Contemporary Music Centre
So Quiet Now... for soprano, viola and piano (1996); Ireland Contemporary Music Centre
Two Songs for Paris for mezzo-soprano, viola and piano (1995); Ireland Contemporary Music Centre

- Jerome de Bromhead (b. 1945)

Fright Fight or Flight for viola solo (2009); Ireland Contemporary Music Centre
Prelude for viola and piano (1977); Ireland Contemporary Music Centre

- Claude Debussy (1862–1918)

Sonata for flute, viola and harp, L. 137 (1915)

- Michel Decoust (b. 1936)

Les Galeries de pierres for viola solo (1984); Éditions Salabert
Sun for solo viola and 12 string instruments (1971); Éditions Durand

- Fernande Decruck (1896–1954)

Sonate en ut dièse (Sonata in C♯) for alto saxophone or viola and orchestra (or piano) (1930s?; published 1943); Éditions Costallat; Éditions Gérard Billaudot

- Jean-Michel Defaye (1932–2025)

Amplitude for viola and piano (1980); Éditions Max Eschig

- Helmut Degen (1911–1995)

Sonata for flute and viola (1963); N. Simrock
Sonata for viola and piano (1940); Willy Müller, Süddeutscher Musikverlag
Stück from Die grosse Reihe for viola solo (1954); Willy Müller, Süddeutscher Musikverlag
10 Stücke (10 Pieces) for violin and viola; Willy Müller, Süddeutscher Musikverlag
Unisono-Stücke 1950 for violin, or viola, or cello solo, or unison ensemble (1950); Heinrichshofen's Verlag

- Adam de la Cour (b. 1979)

Block for viola solo (2012)

- Marcel Delannoy (1898–1962)

Le Dernier chant de la Sulamite, Cantata for alto, viola and piano, Op. 63 (1961); words by Gérard Murail; Éditions Musicales Transatlantiques

- Jack Delano (1914–1997)

Ofrenda Musical (Musical Offering) for viola, horn and string orchestra (1959); Peer Music Classical
Sonata in A minor for viola and piano (1953)

- Lex van Delden (1919–1988)

Concerto for violin, viola, double bass and orchestra, Op. 88 (1965); Donemus
Suite for viola and piano, Op. 4 (1939); Donemus; C.F. Peters

- Frederick Delius (1862–1934)

Caprice and Elegy for viola and piano (1930); original for cello and orchestra; adaptation by Lionel Tertis; Boosey and Hawkes
Serenade from the Drama Hassan (1920–1923); transcription by Lionel Tertis; Boosey and Hawkes
Sonata No. 2 for viola and piano (1923); original for violin and piano; 1929 adaptation by Lionel Tertis; Boosey and Hawkes
Sonata No. 3 for viola and piano (1930); original for violin and piano; 1932 adaptation by Lionel Tertis; Boosey and Hawkes

- Norman Dello Joio (1913–2008)

Lyric Fantasies for viola and string orchestra (1975); Associated Music Publishers

- Thomas Demenga (b. 1954)

Duo? o, du– for viola and cello (1985); Müller & Schade
Musik für leere Saiten und Solo for solo viola and viola ensemble (1997)

- Norman Demuth (1898–1968)

Concerto for viola and orchestra (1951)
Suite for viola solo; Hinrichsen Edition

- Michael Denhoff (b. 1955)

Champs de Mars, Inventions after Marc Chagall for viola and piano, Op. 9 (1975); Breitkopf & Härtel
Moment Musical for viola and piano (1973)
Silence, et puis for alto voice and viola, Op. 101 (2006); Edition Gravis
Since Atwain (II) for viola and cello, Op. 66b (1992); Edition Gravis
Sounds and Shadows for viola, string quartet and piano, Op. 86 (1999); Edition Gravis
Tenebrae for viola and piano, Op. 82 (1997); Edition Gravis
To and Fro in Shadow, "Nebenweg IV" for viola and piano, Op. 83d (1998–1999); Edition Gravis
Two Once So One for viola, cello and string quartet, Op. 66 (1992); Edition Gravis
Zwei Stücke (Two Pieces) for viola and cello (2007)

- Edison Denisov (1929–1996)

Chamber Music for viola, harpsichord and string orchestra (1982); Hans Sikorski
Concerto for 2 violas, harpsichord and string orchestra (1984); Boosey & Hawkes
Concerto for viola and orchestra (1986); Hans Sikorski
Duo for flute and viola (1989); Éditions Alphonse Leduc; United Music Publishers
Es ist genug (It Is Enough), Variations on "Es ist genug", theme of Bach's Choral for viola and piano (1984); for viola and flute, oboe, celeste and string quintet (1986); Boosey & Hawkes
Three Pictures after Paul Klee (Три картины Пауля Клее; Trois Tableaux de Paul Klee; Drei Bilder nach Paul Klee) for viola and ensemble (1984–1985); VEB Deutscher Verlag für Musik
1. Diana in the Autumn Wind (Диана в осеннем ветре; Diane dans le vent d'automne; Diana im Herbstwind) for viola, piano, vibraphone and double bass (1984)
2. Senecio (Сенечо) for viola solo (1985)
3. A Child on the Platform (Ребёнок на перроне; L'enfant sur le perron; Kind an der Freitreppe) for viola, oboe, horn, piano, vibraphone and double bass (1985)

- Frank Denyer (b. 1943)

Marine Residua for shell trumpets, viola and 2 percussionists (1986)
Stalks for shakuhachi, bass recorder and viola (1986)
Woman, Viola and Crow for female violist (viola, voice and percussion sounds) (2004)

- Fabrizio De Rossi Re (b. 1960)

Erato, amore mio (Erato, My Love) for viola and piano (2001)
Krono e gli altri dèmoni e dèi (Cronus and the Other Demons and Gods) for clarinet and viola (1987)
Palus Epidemiarum for viola, cello and double bass (1988)

- Manuel De Sica (1949–2014)

Adagio for viola or clarinet and piano (1999); Edizioni Sugar Music
Solo for viola (1973)
Una breve vacanza (A Brief Vacation) for viola and string orchestra (1973); Edizioni Sugar Music

- Paul Dessau (1894–1979)

Bagatelles for viola and piano (1975)
Sonatine for viola and piano (1929); Dresdner Verlag

- François Devienne (1759–1803)

6 Duos Concertants for flute and viola, Op. 5 (c.1780); Amadeus Verlag

- Frédéric Devreese (1929–2020)

Benvenuta, Suite for viola and piano (1983–2001); CeBeDeM
Canti for cello or viola and piano (2000); CeBeDeM
Circles for viola and piano (2007); CeBeDeM

- David Diamond (1915–2005)

Vocalises for high voice and viola (1935, revised 1956); Southern Music Publishing

- Gustavo Díaz-Jerez (b. 1970)

Sonata for viola and piano (2003); Editorial Periferia Música

- Emma Lou Diemer (b. 1927)

Homage to Paderewski for viola and piano (1997); Seesaw Music
Lovely Song for viola and violin (one player) with piano (1993); Seesaw Music

- Caspar Diethelm (1926–1997)

Apfel des Paris (Apple of Paris), Concerto da Camera for violin, viola, piano, string orchestra and percussion, Op. 313 (1995)
Betruf for viola solo, Op. 317 (1995)
Capoliade: in memoriam Petrus Sebastianus de Capol for viola and harpsichord (or piano), Op. 162 (1979)
Concerto for viola and chamber orchestra, Op. 19 (1955)
Concerto diletto No. 3 for 3 violins, viola and string orchestra, Op. 158 (1979, 1991)
Die goldene Selket, Hymn for viola, string orchestra and vibraphone, Op. 295 (1993)
Duet "Dialogus auctoris atque editoris" for viola and bass clarinet, Op. 168 (1979); Amadeus Verlag
Duo for viola and cello, Op. 107 (1972); Amadeus Verlag
Duo for viola and double bass, Op. 188 (1981)
Jadis, Ballet Suite for flute, viola and harp, Op. 297 (1993)
Pirouette, Trio for flute, viola and double bass, Op. 311 (1994)
Sonata for viola and piano, Op. 105 (1972)
Sonata I for viola solo, Op. 118 (1974); Amadeus Verlag
Sonata II for viola solo, Op. 121 (1974); Amadeus Verlag

- James Dillon (b. 1950)

Siorram (In an Enchanted Dream) for viola solo (1992); Edition Peters
Time Lag Zero for female voice and viola (1982); Edition Peters

- Lawrence Dillon (b. 1959)

Bacchus Chaconne for 2 violins, or violin and viola (1990); American Composers Alliance
Still Point for mezzo-soprano, viola and piano (2007); American Composers Alliance

- Violeta Dinescu (b. 1953)

Dialogo for flute (or clarinet) and viola (1980)
Din cimpoiu for viola solo (1984); Astoria Verlag
Euraculos for clarinet and viola (1982)
L'étranger (The Stranger) for viola and zither (1995)
Ostrov I for viola solo (1987)
Rand for clarinet and viola (1996)
Sonata for viola and piano (1975)

- Renato Dionisi (1910–2000)

Sonatina for viola and piano (1983); Edizioni Suvini Zerboni
Tre movimenti (3 Movements) for viola and string orchestra (1966); Edizioni Musicali G. Zanibon

- Carl Ditters von Dittersdorf (1739–1799)

Concerto in F major for viola and orchestra, K. 168 (1776–1777)
Duo in E♭ major for viola and cello, K. 218
Sinfonia Concertante in D major for viola, double bass and orchestra, K. 127 (1766)
Sonata in E♭ major for viola and double bass
Sonata in E♭ major for viola and piano
6 Sonatas for 2 violins and viola, Op. 2

- Paul-Heinz Dittrich (1930–2020)

Un coup d'aile, 13 Fragments for viola solo (1996); Deutscher Verlag für Musik

- Michael Djupstrom (b. 1980)

Walimai for alto saxophone (or viola) and piano (2005); winner of the 2012 Maurice Gardner Composition Competition sponsored by the American Viola Society

- Václav Dobiáš (1909–1978)

Balada (Ballad) for viola and piano (1944)

- Antun Dobronić (1878–1955)

Priče iz mog zavičaja (Stories from My Homeland) for 4 violas
Ugođaji (Vibes) for 4 violas (published 2005); Muzički Informativni Centar

- Charles Dodge (b. 1942)

Viola Elegy for viola and tape (1987); North Cape Music; Frog Peak Music

- Stephen Dodgson (1924–2013)

Caprice after Puck for viola solo (1978); British Music Information Centre
Echoes of Autumn for viola and guitar (1998); British Music Information Centre
Four Fancies for viola and piano (1964); Chappell Music
Seven Miniatures for viola and piano (1964); Associated Board of the Royal Schools of Music; British Music Information Centre
Sonata for viola and piano (1952)

- Samuel Dolin (1917–2002)

Kinesis I and Kinesis II for viola (or cello, or trombone, or tuba) and piano (1981); Canadian Music Centre

- František Domažlický (1913–1997)

Concerto for viola and orchestra, Op. 36 (1965–1966); Český Hudební Fond; Schott Music Panton
Hudba pro housle a violu (Music for Violin and Viola), Op. 78 (1993); Český Hudební Fond
Pět bagatel (Five Bagatelles) for viola and piano, Op. 41 (1969); Český Hudební Fond

- Gerd Domhardt (1945–1997)

Concerto for viola and orchestra; Breitkopf und Härtel

- Franco Donatoni (1927–2000)

Ali, 2 Pieces for viola solo (1977); Ricordi
Small II for flute, viola and harp (1993); Ricordi
Sonata for viola solo (1952); Edizioni Drago; Edizioni Musicali G. Zanibon

- Josef Friedrich Doppelbauer (1918–1989)

Concerto for viola and small orchestra (1953, revised 1968); Verlag Doblinger
Sonata for viola solo (1977); Verlag Doblinger

- Cornelis Dopper (1870–1939)

Nocturne in F major for viola and orchestra (or organ) (1937)

- Antal Doráti (1906–1988)

Adagio for viola and piano (1987); Müller & Schade

- Daniel Dorff (b. 1956)

Deep Funk, Part 2, Dance Sonata for viola solo (2002); Theodore Presser Company
Spark for viola solo (2009)

- Friedrich Dotzauer (1783–1860)

Concertino in A major for viola and orchestra, Op. 89 (c.1825); N. Simrock

- Jaroslav Doubrava (1909–1960)

Sonata for viola solo (1945)

- Demetrius Constantine Dounis (1886–1954)

Specific Technical Exercises for Viola (Left Hand – Bow Arm), Op. 25 (1941)

- Daniel Doura (b. 1957)

Archi for violin and viola (1985)
Animas Trio for flute, viola and harp (1987)

- Felix Draeseke (1835–1913)

Sonata No. 1 in C minor for viola (viola alta) and piano, WoO 21 (1892)
Sonata No. 2 in F major for viola (viola alta) and piano, WoO 26 (1901–1902)

- Dimitris Dragatakis (1914–2001)

Adagio for solo viola, string orchestra and piano (1969)
Concerto (Κοντσέρτο για βιόλα και ορχήστρα) for viola and orchestra (1992)
Duo (Ντούο για βιόλα και πιάνο) for viola and piano (1984); Philippos Nakas Music House
Music for Three (Μουσική για τρεις) for viola, horn, piano (1969)
Trio (Τρίο για 2 βιολιά και βιόλα) for 2 violins and viola (1960)

- Oliver Drechsel (b. 1973)

Sonatina serena for viola and clarinet, Op. 26 (1997); Edition Dohr

- Erwin Dressel (1909–1972)

Partita for alto saxophone (or clarinet, or viola) and piano (1965); Ries & Erler Musikverlag

- George Dreyfus (b. 1928)

Sonata for violin and viola (1989); Australian Music Centre
Symphonie Concertante for bassoon, violin, viola, cello and string orchestra (1978); Australian Music Centre

- Felix Dreyschock (1860–1906)

Andante religioso in D major for viola and piano, Op. 28 (1894); Otto Junne; Elibron Classics

- Johannes Driessler (1921–1998)

Concerto for string trio and orchestra, Op. 54 (1963)
Fünf Stücke (5 Pieces) for viola and piano, Op. 24 No. 3b (1952); Bärenreiter-Verlag
Sonata for viola solo, Op. 3 No. 1 (1946); Hinnenthal Verlag; Bärenreiter-Verlag
Tripartita for viola and harpsichord, Op. 58 No. 3 (1966)

- Riccardo Drigo (1846–1930)

Meditazione in C major for viola, cello and string orchestra (or piano)

- Duncan Druce (1939–2015)

Chiasmata for 2 violas (1972)
Jugalbundi for clarinet and viola (1968)

- Jacob Druckman (1928–1996)

Concerto for viola and orchestra (1978); Boosey & Hawkes

- Jiří Družecký (Georg Druschetzky) (1745–1819)

Concerto in D major for viola and orchestra (published 1962); N. Simrock

- Fyodor Druzhinin (1932–2007)

Fantasia for viola and orchestra (1980)
Sinfonia a due, Duet for 2 violas (published 2003); Kompozitor
Sonata for viola solo (1959); Kompozitor; Sikorski
Variations for viola solo (1968); Kompozitor

- Pierre Max Dubois (1930–1995)

Suite de dances for viola and string orchestra with harp ad libitum (1960); Éditions Alphonse Leduc

- Théodore Dubois (1837–1924)

Cantabile (or Andante Cantabile) in G major for viola (or cello) and piano (1886)
Terzettino in E♭ major for flute, viola and harp (1905); Éditions Heugel; Ut Orpheus Edizioni

- Denis Dufour (b. 1953)

Altitude for viola solo, Op. 136 (2006)
En sursaut for soprano and viola, Op. 2 (1977)
Jeu délicieux for tenor and viola, Op. 56 (1989)
Le crin s'ébruite for viola and percussion, Op. 3 (1977); Maison Ona

- Hugues Dufourt (b. 1943)

Le Cyprès blanc (The White Cypress) for viola and large orchestra (2003–2004); Éditions Henry Lemoine

- Antoine Duhamel (1925–2014)

Lamento-Mémoire: Récitation concertante for viola and chamber orchestra (1996); Éditions Alphonse Leduc; United Music Publishers

- Maurice Duhamel (1884–1940)

Soniou an dous, Engagement Songs for cello or viola and piano (1911); Rouart, Lerolle & Cie

- John Woods Duke (1899–1984)

Melody in E♭ for viola and piano (1946); Elkan-Vogel
Narrative for viola and piano (1942)
Suite for Viola Alone (1933); The Valley Music Press; American Viola Society Publications
Three Sonnets by Edna St. Vincent Millay for voice, viola and piano (1959); Independent Music Publishers

- Iancu Dumitrescu (b. 1944)

Holzwege for Ioan-Marius Lacraru for viola solo (or 2 violas) (1987)
Movemur III for viola solo (1978)
Soliloquium for Vladimir Mendelsohn for viola solo (1978)

- Thomas Dunhill (1877–1946)

4 Pieces for viola and piano (1928); Stainer & Bell; J. Williams
1. In Courtly Company
2. Alla Sarabanda
3. The Willow Brook
4. Meditation on a Study by Schumann
Phantasy-Trio in E♭ major for violin, viola and piano, Op. 36 (1911); Stainer & Bell; A.P. Schmidt; Prairie Dawg Press
Pleasantries for 2 violins and viola, Op. 63 (1925); J.B. Cramer
Triptych, 3 Impressions for viola and orchestra, Op. 99 (1942); Oxford University Press

- Hubert du Plessis (1922–2011)

Sonata for viola and piano, Op. 43 (1977)

- Albert Dupuis (1877–1967)

Aria for viola and piano or orchestra
Chanson affectueuse for viola and piano
Chant d'adieu for viola and piano (1932)
Chant du retour for viola and piano
Chopin for viola and piano
Evocation d'orient for viola (or violin) and piano
Grieg for viola and piano
La jeune fille au rouet for viola and piano
Méditation for viola and piano
Mendelssohn for viola and piano (1933)
Petite Variation for viola and piano
Schumann for viola and piano

- Joël-François Durand (b. 1954)

Cinq Duos (5 Duos) for violin and viola (1999); Éditions Durand
La Mesure des choses III: La Mesure de la terre et du feu for oboe and viola (1999); Éditions Durand
Le Tombeau de Rameau for flute, viola and harp (2008); Éditions Musicales Européennes

- Louis Durey (1888–1979)

5 Duos (from 10 Inventions) for violin and viola, Op. 35b (1924–1927, revised 1964); Billaudot; E.F.M. Technisonor

- Frédéric Durieux (b. 1959)

Strophe en Marge for viola and piano (1986); Collection Panorama: Œuvres Contemporaines, Volume 3 (1989); Éditions Gérard Billaudot; United Music Publishers

- Zsolt Durkó (1934–1997)

Varianti for viola and piano (1974); Editio Musica Budapest

- Lucien Durosoir (1878–1955)

Poème for violin, viola and orchestra (1920); Symétrie; Éditions M.e.G.e.P.
Vitrail (Stained-glass Window) for viola and piano (1934); Symétrie; Éditions M.e.G.e.P.

- Matthias Durst (1815–1875)

Adagio for 4 violas (c.1870); American Viola Society Publications

- Maurice Duruflé (1902–1986)

Prélude, Récitatif et Variations for flute, viola and piano, Op. 3 (1928); Éditions Durand

- Pascal Dusapin (b. 1955)

In Nomine for viola solo (2000); Éditions Salabert
Inside for viola solo (1980); Éditions Salabert
Ohimé, Duo No. 1 for violin and viola (1992); Éditions Salabert

- Alphonse Duvernoy (1842–1907)

Lied in A minor for viola and piano, Op. 47 (1901); J. Hamelle

- Balys Dvarionas (1904–1972)

Tema su variacijomis (Theme and Variations) for viola and piano (1946); original for bassoon and piano; Gosudarstvennoe muzykalnoe izdatelstvo (State Music Publishing House)

- George Dyson (1883–1964)

Prelude, Fantasy and Chaconne for cello (or viola) and small orchestra (or piano) (1935); Novello & Co.

== E ==
- John Eaton (1935–2015)

Study for Viola and Two Tape Recorders (1970)
Overture for the Dedication of a House for mezzo-soprano, boy soprano, viola and synthesizer (1990)

- Otto Ebel von Sosen (1899–1974)

Arioso im alten Stil (Arioso in the Old Style) for clarinet (or viola) and string orchestra, Op. 15 (1922); Henry Litolff's Verlag; Edition Peters

- Petr Eben (1929–2007)

Písně nelaskavé (Unkind Songs) for alto and viola (1963); Panton Praha
Rorate coeli, Fantasy for viola and organ (1982); Universal Edition

- Sophie Carmen Eckhardt-Gramatté (1899–1974)

Duo for viola and cello, E. 109 (1944); Canadian Music Centre
Lagrime for viola (or cello) and piano, E. 61 (1928); Canadian Music Centre

- Helmut Eder (1916–2005)

Concertino for viola, winds and percussion, Op. 124 (2002); Doblinger
Concerto "Der reisende Schatten" for viola and orchestra, Op. 116 (1999); Doblinger
Jeu parti for viola and piano, Op. 102 (1993); Doblinger
3 Sätze (3 Movements) for viola, double bass and piano, Op. 73 No. 3 (1983); Doblinger
Sonatina for viola and piano, Op. 34 No. 2 (1963); Doblinger

- Ross Edwards (b. 1943)

Ecstatic Dance II for 2 violas, or viola and cello (1990); G. Ricordi London; Australian Music Centre
Enyato II for viola solo (1994); G. Ricordi London; Australian Music Centre

- René Eespere (b. 1953)

Concerto for viola and orchestra (1996, 1998); Edition 49

- Cecil Effinger (1914–1990)

Divertimento for violin, viola and piano, Op. 51 (1950)
Melody for clarinet or viola and piano, Op. 43 No. 1 (1947); Theodore Presser Compan

- Klaus Egge (1906–1979)

Duo Concertante for violin and viola, Op. 23 (1950); Harald Lyche Musikkforlag

- Abel Ehrlich (1915–2003)

About Different Jugs, 3 Pieces for violin and viola (1991); Israeli Music Center
And All Traces of Him Were Lost, Music for viola and piano (1998); Israeli Music Center
And I'm Looking Down on Earth for 2 violins and viola (1999); Israeli Music Center
Batri lishnayim! for viola and clarinet, (Cycle I. Frances No. 2) (1991); Israeli Music Center
A Being of Sound for viola and 5 singers (1998); Israeli Music Center
Bin allein unter vielen Leuten for viola and piano (1997); Israeli Music Center
Bridge for soprano, viola and trombone (1998); Israeli Music Center
Bülbul for female choir, violin and viola (1991); Israeli Music Center
Dance of the Macabre Mice for tenor, flute and viola (1995); Israeli Music Center
Dans le vieux parc (Evoqué le passé I) for violin and viola (1995); Israeli Music Center
Die Memel for viola solo (1998); Israeli Music Center
A Dissociated Abundance of Being for violin and viola (1996); Israeli Music Center
Drawing Bust of a Child for oboe and 3 violas (1999); Israeli Music Center
Ein ernster Augenbuck for violin and viola (2001); Israeli Music Center
El Ciego for violin and viola (1991); Israeli Music Center
Être dans l'enchantement for flute, viola and piano (2000); Israeli Music Center
Exercise in Calmness for flute, viola and harp (1998); Israeli Music Center
From the Diary of a Gravitational-Waves-Scientist, for viola and piano (1995); Israeli Music Center
From This You May Learn for flute, viola and piano (1955); Israeli Music Center
Für Kolja: Psalm LXIII for violin and viola (1997); Israeli Music Center
A Geological Layer for clarinet and viola (1988); Israeli Music Center
Greetings From 11.1.1991 for viola and piano (1991); Israeli Music Center
Greetings From 13.1.1991 for viola and piano (1991); Israeli Music Center
Greetings From 14.1.1991 for viola and piano (1991); Israeli Music Center
Greetings From 15.1.1991 for viola and piano (1991); Israeli Music Center
Hatsclavio for trumpet, clarinet and viola (1988); Israeli Music Center
He Thinks He Is at Rest for alto, clarinet and viola (1998); Israeli Music Center
He Who Is Always Alone for 4 violas (2001); Israeli Music Center
Honey Out of the Hive for violin, viola and piano (1990); Israeli Music Center
I Told My Ways for guitar and viola (1997); Israeli Music Center
In 1500 Columbus for violin and viola (1990); Israeli Music Center
In Memory of Dan Pagis for violin and viola (1996); Israeli Music Center
Let Tears Toll for the Dead for viola and piano (2007); Israeli Music Center
Let's Presume No. 2 for viola and cello (1991); Israeli Music Center
A Man Draws a Figure on a Wall for violin and viola (1998); Israeli Music Center
May There Be Abundant Peace for viola and guitar (1993); Israeli Music Center
Movement for Trio for viola, horn and piano (2000); Israeli Music Center
Movilna mane for violin and viola (1990); Israeli Music Center
Music for Flute and Viola (1964); Israeli Music Center
Music for Viola and Double Bass (1998); Israeli Music Center
Nimusin for mixed choir, violin and viola (1990); Israeli Music Center
On Seeing the Elgin Marbles for tenor and viola (1997); Israeli Music Center
On the Other Hand for viola and piano (1998); Israeli Music Center
On the Road Home for alto, tenor and viola (1995); Israeli Music Center
Overshadowed for clarinet, violin and viola (1998); Israeli Music Center
Papo's Love Song for tenor, viola and clarinet (1991); Israeli Music Center
Process for violin and viola (1988); Israeli Music Center
Prosa 1917 for 2 tenors and 1 viola (1995); Israeli Music Center
Psalm 129 for viola solo (1995); Israeli Music Center
Reactions for violin and viola (2001); Israeli Music Center
Registered Letter for clarinet, viola and double bass (1993); Israeli Music Center
Released and Compensated for viola and piano (1990); Israeli Music Center
Rosen schreiten for soprano and viola (1990); Israeli Music Center
Sand-Glass for viola and string orchestra (1997); Israeli Music Center
September 1998 for viola, cello and double bass (1998); Israeli Music Center
Suite for horn, viola and guitar (1996); Israeli Music Center
Suspicious Object for tenor and viola (1996); Israeli Music Center
Takes a Hint for viola and cello (2000); Israeli Music Center
That's in the Air for high voice, viola and cello (2001); Israeli Music Center
The Cry of Ibn Saruk for 4 violas (2002); Israeli Music Center
The Hawk for tenor, viola and trombone (1997); Israeli Music Center
The Night of the Owl for tenor and viola (2000); Israeli Music Center
This Year Too (גם השנה) for baritone, clarinet and viola (1993); Israeli Music Center
Three Dialogues for violin and viola (1997); Israeli Music Center
Three Gloomy Fates for viola, horn and bass clarinet (1993); Israeli Music Center
Three Movements for Trio for clarinet, viola and bassoon (1992); Israeli Music Center
Three Poems for Three Instruments for flute, violin and viola (1998); Israeli Music Center
To Be Abandoned for violin and viola (1997); Israeli Music Center
Trio for 2 violins and viola (1998); Israeli Music Center
Trio in 3 Movements for viola, clarinet and piano (2001); Israeli Music Center
Viola & Tape for viola and live electronics (1993); Israeli Music Center
Vorschlag zu einer Gebrauchsanweisung for reciter, clarinet and viola (1999); Israeli Music Center
What is the Advantage II for viola solo (1995); Israeli Music Center
Within the Prism for flute and viola (2001); Israeli Music Center

- Ernst Eichner (1740–1777)

Sechs Duette (6 Duets) for violin and viola, Op. 10

- Ludovico Einaudi (b. 1955)

5 Duetti for violin and viola (1988); Ricordi

- Gottfried von Einem (1918–1996)

Solo Sonata for viola, Op. 60 (1980); Edition Schott

- Maija Einfelde (b. 1939)

Maestoso for viola and piano
Pirms saules rieta (Before Sunset) for clarinet, viola and piano (1994); Musica Baltica
Prelūdija (Prelude) for oboe and viola (1999); Musica Baltica
Sonāte meditācija (Sonata-Meditation) for viola and piano (1982); Musica Baltica

- Karólína Eiríksdóttir (b. 1951)

Na Carenza for mezzo-soprano, oboe and viola (1993); Íslenzk Tónverkamiðstöð
Strenglag (String Tune) for viola and piano (2002); Íslenzk Tónverkamiðstöð

- Will Eisenmann (1906–1992)

Marienlegende for high voice, viola and piano, Op. 50 (1950); words by Klabund
Musik for viola and piano, Op. 60 (1957)
Sänge eines fahrenden Spielmanns for alto, viola and piano, Op. 56 (1954); words by Stefan George

- Edward Elgar (1857–1934)

Canto Popolare for viola and piano (1904); transcription by the composer from the concert-overture In the South (Alassio), Op. 50 (1903–1904); Novello & Co.
Concerto in E minor for viola and orchestra, Op. 85 (1918–1919); 1929 adaptation of the Cello Concerto by Lionel Tertis; Novello & Co.

- Brian Elias (b. 1948)

But When I Sleep ... for viola solo (1987); Chester Music

- Manuel de Elías (b. 1939)

Concierto de cámara for viola, percussion and string orchestra (1992)
Elegía for viola and piano (1962)
Preludio (Pieza de cámara No. 1) for viola solo (1962)
Preludio for viola solo (1976)

- Anders Eliasson (1947–2013)

Concerto for violin, viola and chamber orchestra (2009); Gehrmans Musikförlag

- Heino Eller (1887–1970)

Moderato sostenuto in D minor for voice, viola and piano (1921)

- Paul Elwood (b. 1958)

Capricious Apparitions for 2 violas and bowed banjo (2009)

- Ivo van Emmerik (b. 1961)

((( ))), 5 Pieces for Various Instruments: No. 1 for viola solo (1988)
(((O))) for viola solo (1991)
(((O)))2 for viola solo (1993)

- František Gregor Emmert (1940–2015)

Concerto for viola and orchestra (1965); Český Hudební Fond
Magnificat na francouzský text (Magnificat on French Text) for mezzo-soprano, clarinet, viola and piano (2002); Český Hudební Fond
Sonata for viola solo (1998); Český Hudební Fond
Trio for clarinet, viola and piano (1981); Český Hudební Fond

- George Enescu (1881–1955)

Doină for baritone, viola and cello (1905); Editura Muzicală, Bucharest; Éditions Salabert
Piesă de concert (Concertpiece) for viola and piano (1906)

- Mark Engebretson (b. 1964)

Where Does Love Go? for viola and live electronics (2003); Effiny Music

- Manuel Enríquez (1926–1994)

Cuatro Piezas (4 Pieces) for viola and piano (1962)
Tres Invenciones (3 Inventions) for flute and viola (1964)

- Péter Eötvös (b. 1944)

désaccord for 2 violas (2001); Edition Ricordi München
Replica for viola and orchestra (1998); Edition Ricordi München

- David Epstein (1930–2002)

Fantasy Variations for viola solo (1963); MCA Music

- Donald Erb (1927–2008)

Harold's Trip to the Sky, Trio for viola, prepared piano and percussion (1972); Merion Music; Theodore Presser Company

- Heimo Erbse (1924–2005)

4 lyrische Stücke (4 Lyrical Pieces) for viola and piano, Op. 39c (1978); original for bassoon and piano; Verlag Doblinger

- Dietrich Erdmann (1917–2009)

Concertino for viola (or English horn or clarinet) and ensemble of plucked instruments (1986); Volksmusikverlag Joachim Trekel
Prisma for viola and piano (1982–1983); Breitkopf & Härtel

- Hans-Ola Ericsson (b. 1958)

Musik för en sjuk värld (Niemandsland II) (Music for a Sick World) for solo viola and chamber orchestra (1980–1981); STIM; Swedish Music Information Centre

- Iván Erőd (1936–2019)

Concerto for viola and orchestra, Op. 30 (1979–1980); Ludwig Doblinger Musikverlag
Verseny-fantázia (Fantasy Concertante; Konzertante Fantasie) for viola and string orchestra, Op. 35 (1980–1981); Ludwig Doblinger Musikverlag
Virágcsendélet (Flower Piece; Blumenstück) for viola solo, Op. 62 (1994); Ludwig Doblinger Musikverlag

- Pozzi Escot (b. 1933)

Bels dous amics for soprano, oboe and viola (1993); Publication Contact International
Mirabilis I for viola and electronic tape (1990); Publication Contact International

- Andrei Eshpai (1925–2015)

Concerto for viola and orchestra (1987); Muzyka

- Michele Esposito (1855–1929)

2 Pieces for viola and piano, Op. 22 (1881)

- Julio Estrada (b. 1943)

Yuunohui'ome for viola solo, E. 18b (1990); Éditions Salabert

- Alvin Etler (1913–1973)

Duo for oboe (or flute, or violin) and viola (or clarinet) (1945); New Valley Music Press
Sonata for oboe, clarinet and viola (1947); The Valley Music Press
Sonata for viola and harpsichord (1959); Continuo Music Press; Associated Music Publishers

- Pierre Even (b. 1946)

Concertino for viola and string orchestra, Op. 11 (1970, 2004)

- Victor Ewald (1860–1935)

Romance in D major for cello or viola and piano, Op. 2 (1894)

- Eric Ewazen (b. 1954)

Two Look at Two for high voice, viola and piano (1988)
Scenarios from a Mixed Landscape for high voice, viola and harp (1993)
Sonata for viola and piano (1991)

- Ernest van der Eyken (1913–2010)

Ballata for viola and piano (1981); CeBeDeM
Sonata for viola solo (1996); CeBeDeM
Twee melodieën (2 Melodies) for viola and piano (1942); Editions Metropolis; CeBeDeM
