= Tamara Brooks =

American conductor (1941–2012)

- Born: 11 September 1941
- Died: 24 May 2012 (aged 70)
- Occupation: Conductor

Tamara Brooks (11 September 1941 – 19 May 2012) was an American choral conductor.

== Biography ==
Brooks studied at the Juilliard School of Music, where she received degrees in piano (studying under Eduard Steuermann) and in conducting. She went on to have an extremely varied career, of which choral conducting was merely a part.

Brooks conducted concerts in many countries throughout the world (Austria, Cyprus, Denmark, England, France, Germany, Greece, the Netherlands, Israel, Italy, Japan, Poland, Russia, Taiwan, Turkey, Wales). Her positions included principal guest conductor of the Istanbul Symphony, conductor of the Cyprus Broadcast Orchestra, and guest conductor of the Mozarteum Orchestra Salzburg. She also prepared choruses for such conductors as Abbado, Frühbeck de Burgos, Giulini, Leinsdorf, Mehta, Muti, Ormandy, Rostropovich, Rozhdestvensky, Tennstedt, and Tilson Thomas.

Brooks was a champion of contemporary music, commissioning and/or performing works by composers such as Adams, Cage, Caltabiano, Cogan, Druckman, Escot, Golijov, Earl Kim, Liang, Ligeti, Lutoslawski, Navok, Persichetti, Schuller, Sessions, Sur, Takemitsu, and Tippett.

Prior to her arrival in Boston, Brooks was the music director of the Mendelssohn Club of Philadelphia for eleven years. With this ensemble she made a Grammy-nominated recording of choral works of Vincent Persichetti, who was a mentor and close personal friend. At that time, she was also director of the Bi-College Orchestra at Haverford and Bryn Mawr Colleges, where she met Dean David Potter (now retired from Syracuse), whom she later married. While at Bryn Mawr and Haverford, she served as mentor to Elizabeth Schulze, now the conductor of the Maryland Symphony.

Brooks was director of choral activities at New England Conservatory from 1989 to 2000, succeeding Lorna Cooke deVaron. During that time she led many highly praised performances, in particular a 1992 Verdi Requiem that received a glowing review in the Boston Globe, surpassing the reception to the Boston Symphony Orchestra's performance of the Requiem that same year. In addition to New England Conservatory, Brooks held numerous other important academic positions.

In 1998, Hankus Netsky invited Brooks to take part in a PBS television program entitled Taste of Passover. It was there that she met Theodore Bikel. Ten years later she married Bikel, with whom she toured the world in acclaimed concerts of folk music.

Netsky wrote:

"Tamara was incredibly dynamic, charismatic, energetic, a vortex of passion, love, and talent. When she got excited about something, there was no stopping her. And she got excited about a lot of things. When that happened, she was 100% there and never imagined that her students or others might not be as excited about a project as she was."

Brooks died suddenly of a heart attack in Houston on 19 May 2012.
