= List of compositions by Rebecca Clarke =

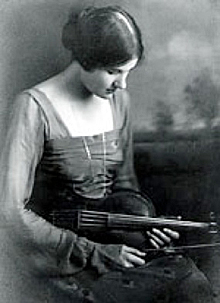
Clarke with a Viola

The following is a sortable list of compositions by Rebecca Clarke, drawn largely from the lists found on the website of the Rebecca Clarke Society.

The works are categorized and sortable by genre, date of composition, and title.

Genre	Date	Title	Scoring	Notes	Publisher / owner
Orchestral	1941	Combined Carols	for string orchestra	original for 2 violins, viola and cello	
Chamber music	1907–1908	Danse bizarre	for 2 violins and piano	once believed lost; found in the Rebecca Clarke estate; premiered in 2003	Rebecca Clarke Estate
Chamber music	1907–1908	Prelude	for 2 violins and piano	once believed lost; found in the Rebecca Clarke estate; premiered in 2003	Rebecca Clarke Estate
Chamber music	1907–1908	Nocturne	for 2 violins and piano	once believed lost; found in the Rebecca Clarke estate; premiered in 2003	Rebecca Clarke Estate
Chamber music	1907–1908	Finale	for 2 violins and piano	incomplete	Rebecca Clarke Estate
Chamber music	1907–1909	Sonata	for violin and piano	in one movement	Rebecca Clarke Estate
Chamber music	1908–1909	Sonata	for violin and piano		Rebecca Clarke Estate
Chamber music	1909	Lullaby	for viola and piano		Oxford University Press
Chamber music	1913	Lullaby (on an ancient Irish tune)	for viola and piano		Oxford University Press
Chamber music	ca. 1916	2 Pieces: 1. Lullaby; 2. Grotesque	for viola (or violin) and cello		Oxford University Press
Chamber music	1917-1918	Untitled movement	for viola and piano		Oxford University Press
Chamber music	1917–1918	Morpheus	for viola and piano	composed under the pseudonym "Anthony Trent"; Morpheus is the Greek god of dreams.	Oxford University Press
Chamber music	1917–1918	Untitled Work	for viola and piano		Oxford University Press
Chamber music	1918	Lullaby	for viola and piano		Oxford University Press
Chamber music	1919	Sonata	for viola (or cello) and piano		Chester Music; DaCapo Press; Hildegard Publishing
Chamber music	1921	Chinese Puzzle	for violin (or viola) and piano		Oxford University Press
Chamber music	1921, 1925	Chinese Puzzle	for flute, violin, viola and cello	original for violin and piano	Oxford University Press
Chamber music	?1921	Epilogue	for cello and piano		Oxford University Press
Chamber music	1921	Trio	for violin, cello and piano		Winthrop Rogers; DaCapo Press; Boosey & Hawkes
Chamber music	1923	Rhapsody	for cello and piano		Library of Congress
Chamber music	1924	Comodo et amabile	for 2 violins, viola and cello		Oxford University Press
Chamber music	1924	Midsummer Moon	for violin and piano		Oxford University Press
Chamber music	1926	Poem	for 2 violins, viola and cello		Oxford University Press
Chamber music	ca. 1940	Untitled Works	for 2 instruments: 1. for 2 treble instruments 2. for treble and bass instruments	2 compositional studies; unfinished	
Chamber music	1941	Combined Carols	for 2 violins, viola and cello	also arranged for string orchestra	Rebecca Clarke Estate
Chamber music	?1940–1941	Passacaglia (on an Old English Tune, attributed to Tallis) in C minor	for viola (or cello) and piano	tune attributed to Thomas Tallis	G. Schirmer; Chappell Music; Hildegard Publishing
Chamber music	1941	Prelude, Allegro and Pastorale	for viola and clarinet		Oxford University Press
Chamber music	?1941	Dumka	for violin, viola and piano		Oxford University Press
Chamber music	1944	I'll bid my heart be still (Old Scottish border melody)	for viola and piano		Oxford University Press
Piano	1907–1908	Theme and Variations	for piano	once believed lost; found in the Rebecca Clarke estate; premiered in 2003	
Piano	?1930	Cortège	for piano	revised 1970s	
Chamber music	ca. 1940	Untitled, 2 pieces for two instruments: 1. One with two treble clef parts 2. one with treble and bass clef parts	for compositional studies		Oxford University Press
Choral	ca. 1906	Now Fie on Love	for male chorus	words by anonymous	Oxford University Press
Choral	1907	Music, When Soft Voices Die	for mixed chorus	words by Percy Bysshe Shelley	Oxford University Press
Choral	ca. 1908	A Lover's Dirge	for mixed chorus	words from Twelfth Night by William Shakespeare	Oxford University Press
Choral	ca. 1909	The Owl (When Cats Run Home and Light Is Come)	for mixed chorus	words by Alfred, Lord Tennyson	
Choral	ca. 1911–1912	Come, O come, my life's delight	for mixed chorus	words by Thomas Campion; also for voice and piano	Oxford University Press
Choral	ca. 1911–1912	My Spirit Like a Charmed Bark Doth Float	for mixed chorus	words by Percy Bysshe Shelley	Oxford University Press
Choral	ca. 1911–1912	Weep You No More Sad Fountains	for mixed chorus	words by anonymous (John Dowland?); also for voice and piano	
Choral	ca. 1914	Philomela	for mixed chorus	words by Sir Philip Sidney	Oxford University Press
Choral	1921	He That Dwelleth in the Secret Place (Psalm 91)	for SATB soloists and mixed chorus		
Choral	1928	There Is No Rose of Such Virtue	for baritone solo and alto, tenor, baritone, bass chorus	after a 15th-century English carol	Oxford University Press
Choral	ca. 1937	Ave Maria	for female chorus		
Choral	ca. 1943	Chorus from Hellas	for female chorus	words from Hellas by Percy Bysshe Shelley	Oxford University Press
Vocal	ca. 1903	Wandrers Nachtlied	for voice and piano	words by Johann Wolfgang von Goethe	
Vocal	1904	Ah, for the Red Spring Rose	for voice and piano		
Vocal	1904	Aufblick	for voice and piano	words by Richard Dehmel	
Vocal	1904	Shiv and the Grasshopper	for voice and piano	words from The Jungle Book by Rudyard Kipling	
Vocal	ca. 1904	Chanson	for voice and piano	words by Maurice Maeterlinck	
Vocal	ca. 1904	Klage	for voice and piano	words by Richard Dehmel	
Vocal	ca. 1904	O Welt	for voice and piano		
Vocal	ca. 1904	Stimme im Dunkeln	for voice and piano	words by Richard Dehmel	
Vocal	1905	Du	for voice and piano	words by Richard von Schaukal	
Vocal	ca. 1905	The Moving Finger Writes	for voice and piano	words from The Rubáiyát of Omar Khayyám translated by Edward FitzGerald	
Vocal	ca. 1905	Oh, Dreaming World	for voice and piano		
Vocal	ca. 1905	Wiegenlied	for voice, violin and piano	words by Detlev von Liliencron	
Vocal	1906	Durch die Nacht	for voice and piano	words by Richard Dehmel	
Vocal	ca. 1906	Nach einem Regen	for voice and piano	words by Richard Dehmel	
Vocal	ca. 1907	Das Ideal	for voice and piano	words by Richard Dehmel	
Vocal	1907	Magna est veritas	for voice and piano	words by Coventry Patmore	
Vocal	1907	Manche Nacht	for voice and piano	words by Richard Dehmel	
Vocal	1907	Nacht für Nacht	for 2 voices and piano	words by Richard Dehmel	
Vocal	1907	Vergissmeinnicht	for voice and piano	words by Richard Dehmel	
Vocal	ca. 1909	Spirits	for 2 high voices and piano	words by Robert Bridges	
Vocal	ca. 1910	The Color of Life	for voice and piano	words from traditional Chinese writings	
Vocal	ca. 1910	Return of Spring	for voice and piano	words from traditional Chinese writings	
Vocal	ca. 1910	Tears	for voice and piano	words from traditional Chinese writings	
Vocal	ca. 1911	The Folly of Being Comforted	for voice and piano	words by William Butler Yeats	
Vocal	ca. 1911–1912; 1926	Come, Oh Come, My Life's Delight	for voice and piano	words by Thomas Campion; original version for mixed chorus	
Vocal	ca. 1912	The Cloths of Heaven	for voice and piano	words by William Butler Yeats	
Vocal	ca. 1912	Shy One	for voice and piano	words by William Butler Yeats	
Vocal	ca. 1912	Weep You No More Sad Fountains	for voice and piano	words by anonymous (John Dowland?); also for mixed chorus	Oxford University Press
Vocal	ca. 1912–1913	Away Delights	for 2 voices and piano	words by John Fletcher	
Vocal	ca. 1912–1913	Hymn to Pan	for tenor, baritone and piano	words by John Fletcher	
Vocal	ca. 1913	Infant Joy	for voice and piano	words by William Blake	
Vocal	1919	Down by the Salley Gardens	for voice and piano	words by William Butler Yeats; also for voice and violin	
Vocal	1920	Psalm 63	for voice and piano		
Vocal	1922	The Seal Man	for voice and piano	words by John Masefield	Winthrop Rogers; Boosey & Hawkes
Vocal	1924	Three Old English Songs: 1. It Was a Lover and His Lass; 2. Phyllis on the New Mown Hay; 3. The Tailor and His Mouse	for voice and violin	1. words by William Shakespeare	Boosey & Hawkes
Vocal	1925	June Twilight	for voice and piano	words by John Masefield	
Vocal	1926	A Dream	for voice and piano	words by William Butler Yeats	
Vocal	1926	Poem (Adagio)	for voice and string quartet		Oxford University Press
Vocal	1926	Sleep	for tenor, baritone and piano	words by John Fletcher; 2 versions	
Vocal	1926	Sleep [version II]	for tenor, baritone and piano	words by John Fletcher; 2 versions	
Vocal	1926	Three Irish Country Songs: 1. I Know My Love; 2. I Know Where I'm Goin; 3. As I Was Goin to Ballynure	for voice and violin		
Vocal	ca. 1926	Take, O Take Those Lips Away	for tenor, baritone and piano	words from Measure for Measure by William Shakespeare	
Vocal	1927	The Cherry-blossom Wand	for voice and piano	words by Anna Wickham	Oxford University Press
Vocal	1927	Eight O'clock	for voice and piano	words by A. E. Housman	
Vocal	ca. 1928	Greeting	for voice and piano	words by Ella Young	
Vocal	1929	The Aspidistra	for voice and piano	words by Claude Flight	
Vocal	1929	Cradle Song	for voice and piano	words by William Blake	Oxford University Press
Vocal	1929–1933	The Tiger (Tiger, Tiger)	for voice and piano	words by William Blake	
Vocal	ca. 1940	Binnorie	for voice and piano	words after a traditional ballad The Twa Sisters	
Vocal	ca. 1940	Daybreak	for voice and string quartet	words by John Donne	Prairie Dawg Press
Vocal	1941	Lethe	for voice and piano	words by Edna St. Vincent Millay	
Vocal	1942	The Donkey	for voice and piano	words by G. K. Chesterton	
Vocal	1919, 1950s	Down by the Salley Gardens	for voice and violin	words by William Butler Yeats; original for voice and violin	
Vocal	1954	God Made a Tree	for voice and piano	words by Katherine Kendall	
Vocal	ca. 1907	Up-Hill	for voice and piano	words by Christina Rossetti	
