= Matthew Jones (musician) =

British violist, violinist and composer (born 1974)

- Born: 1974 (age 51–52); Swansea, Wales
- Occupations: Violist; Violinist; Academic teacher
- Organizations: Guildhall School of Music and Drama
- Website: matt-jones.com

Matthew Jones (born 1974) is a British violist, violinist and composer primarily known for his international performance work as a soloist, recitalist and chamber musician. He is also a professor of viola and head of chamber music at Guildhall School of Music and Drama, and runs an in-demand performance health consultancy practice. He is fluent in Italian.

== Biography ==
Jones was born in Swansea, Wales, and began studying violin at the age of five. After graduating with a first class degree in mathematics from the University of Warwick, he studied violin at the Royal College of Music in London and viola privately with violist Rivka Golani.

== Performing career ==
Hailed by The Strad magazine as "a worthy successor to Lionel Tertis" and winner of the prize for the most promising British entrant at the 2003 Lionel Tertis International Viola Competition, Jones is violist of the Bridge Duo (viola and piano), the Debussy Ensemble (flute, viola and harp) and violinist with Ensemble MidtVest (an innovative ten-piece ensemble based in Denmark). He can frequently be seen performing in major international concert venues such as the Royal Festival Hall, the Royal Albert Hall and Wigmore Hall in London, Forbidden City Concert Hall in Beijing and Carnegie Hall where he made his critically acclaimed US recital debut in 2008.

Jones has commissioned numerous works and given many world and European premieres, and champions neglected viola works through recitals and recordings. He is in demand as a concerto soloist, performing with such orchestras as the RTÉ National Symphony Orchestra.

Jones was the only British-based violist to be invited to perform at the 2010 International Viola Congress in Cincinnati, and was also a member of the Badke String Quartet when they won the 2007 Melbourne International Chamber Music Competition.

== Pedagogy ==
Jones is Professor of Viola and in August 2017 was appointed Head of Chamber Music at Guildhall School of Music and Drama. He has given masterclasses in the US at institutions such as Indiana University and Cincinnati College-Conservatory of Music, and in Malaysia, Australia, Japan and throughout Europe and the UK.

Jones was the inaugural recipient of the RWCMD's William Walton Fellowship. In addition he is passionate about musical education for younger students through his work with Pro Corda and Aldeburgh Young Musicians.

== Performance wellness ==
Inspired by his recovery from a career-threatening repetitive strain injury at the age of 23, Jones developed a keen interest in performers' well-being and trained as a teacher of the Alexander Technique, Kundalini Yoga and Performance Wellness. Jones now works worldwide as a consultant to musicians on enhancing performance using these and other methods. His students of the Alexander Technique have included world-renowned conductors and soloists, world champion athletes and several orchestras including the European Union Youth Orchestra. He has presented workshops and seminars on healthy practice for musicians and techniques for enhancing performance at conservatoires in the UK, Europe and the US.

== Charitable associations ==
Through his long-term involvement with the Live Music Now! and Lost Chord schemes in the UK, Jones is committed to outreach and community work.

== Compositions ==
Jones' work as a composer, transcriber and arranger include:

- String Quartet No.1 Deletia (1995, revised 2004)
- Slingshot!, a musical in two acts (book/lyrics by Bethan Jones) premiered by Music Theatre Warwick (1999)
- William Walton: Sonata for Viola and Piano (transcribed from Sonata for Violin and Piano) (2008)
- Fantasia on "Roma nun fa' la stupida stasera" for solo violin (2005)
- Fantasia on "My Welsh Home" for viola solo (2002)

== Discography ==
- Phantasy: English Music for Viola and Piano – The Bridge Duo: Matthew Jones, viola; Michael Hampton, piano; London Independent Records (2006)

Arthur Bliss – Sonata for viola and piano (1933)
Frank Bridge – Gondoliera for viola and piano, H. 80 (1907)
Frank Bridge – Meditation for viola and piano, H. 103 (1912)
Frank Bridge – Allegro appassionato for viola and piano, H. 82 (1908)
Rebecca Clarke – Morpheus for viola and piano (1917–1918)
York Bowen – Phantasy in F major for viola and piano, Op. 54 (1918)

- Metamorphoses: The Chamber Music of Hafliði Hallgrímsson; Fidelio Trio (Darragh Morgan, violin; Robin Michael, cello; Mary Dullea, piano); Matthew Jones, viola; Delphian Records (2008)

Notes from a Diary for viola and piano, Op. 33 (2005)

- 'ongs of the Cotton Grass: The Chamber Music of Hilary Tann; Matthew Jones (viola and violin) and ensemble; Deux-Elles Records (2008)

The Walls of Morlais Castle for oboe, viola and cello (1998, 2000)
Songs of the Cotton Grass for soprano and viola (1999–2005)
The Cresset Stone, Meditation for solo viola (1993)
From the Song of Amergin for flute, viola and harp (1995)
Duo for oboe and viola (1981)
Nothing Forgotten for violin, cello and piano (1997)

- Sergei Prokofiev – Romeo and Juliet, world premiere recording of the complete transcriptions for viola and piano by Vadim Borisovsky, Grunes and Jones; Matthew Jones, viola; Rivka Golani, viola; Michael Hampton, piano; Naxos (2010)
- English Music for Viola – Matthew Jones, viola; Michael Hampton, piano; Naxos 8.572579 (2011)

Arnold Bax – Legend for viola and piano (1929)
Arthur Bliss – Intermezzo: Tempo di mazurka for viola and piano; arranged by Watson Forbes from Piano Quartet in A minor (1915)
Frank Bridge – 4 Pieces for viola and piano; arrangements by Veronica Leigh Jacobs

Berceuse, H. 8 (1901)
Sérénade, H. 23 (1903)
Élégie, H. 47 (1904)
Cradle Song, H. 96 (1910)

Rebecca Clarke – Viola Sonata (1919)
Theodore Holland (1878–1947) – Suite in D for viola and piano (1935)
Ralph Vaughan Williams – Romance for viola and piano (ca.1914)
William Walton – 2 Pieces (Canzonetta and Scherzetto) for viola and piano (1948, 1950); original for violin and piano; arranged by Matthew Jones

- Composers of Wales, premiere recordings of works for violin/viola by Andrew Wilson-Dickson, Enid Luff, Peter Reynolds, Stephanie Power, Gareth Glyn and Michael Parkin; Composers of Wales (2011)
- Chamber Music by Vagn Holmboe, Ensemble MidtVest; (2011)
- "Terzetti" – Trios for Flute, Viola and Harp. Debussy Ensemble (Susan Milan, flute; Matthew Jones, viola; Ieuan Jones, harp); Divine Art DDA25099 (2012)

Arnold Bax – Elegiac Trio
Claude Debussy – Sonate en Trio
Maurice Ravel – Sonatine en Trio (arr. Carlos Salzedo)
William Mathias – Zodiac Trio, Op. 70
Theodore Dubois – Terzettino

- York Bowen – Viola Sonatas Nos. 1 and 2 / Phantasy, Op. 54, Bridge Duo: Matthew Jones, viola; Michael Hampton, piano; Naxos 8.572580 (2011)

Sonata No. 1 in C minor for viola and piano, Op. 18 (1905)
Sonata No. 2 in F major for viola and piano, Op. 22 (1906)
Phantasy in F major for viola and piano, Op. 54 (1918)

- Mixed Doubles – Gordon Crosse: Concerto for viola and string orchestra with horn (2009); Matthew Jones, viola; Timothy Reynish, conductor; Manchester Sinfonia; Métier MSV 77201 (2013)
- Benjamin Britten – Britten: Reflections, Matthew Jones, viola; Annabel Thwaite, piano; Naxos 8.573136 (2013)

Etude for viola solo (1929)
Elegy for viola solo (1930)
Reflection for viola and piano (1930)
Lachrymae: Reflections on a Song by John Dowland for viola and piano, Op. 48 (1950)
Frank Bridge – There Is a Willow Grows Aslant a Brook for viola and piano, H. 173 (1927); 1932 transcription by Britten
