= Morpheus (Rebecca Clarke) =

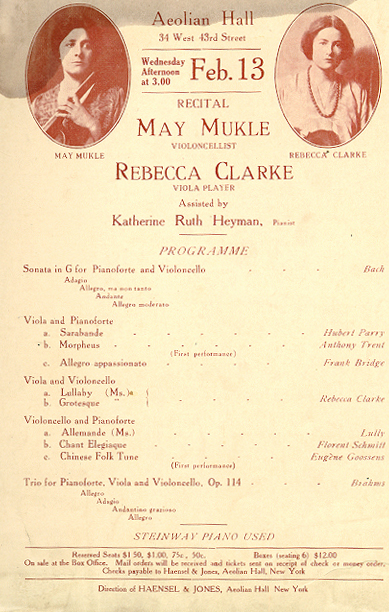
Programme for the première of Morpheus, given by the composer

Morpheus is a composition for viola and piano by Rebecca Clarke, the English violist. It was written in 1917 when Clarke was pursuing a performing career in the United States. The piece shows off the impressionistic musical language Clarke had developed, modelled on the music of Claude Debussy and Ralph Vaughan Williams, that is also apparent in her Viola Sonata. The harmonies are ethereal and otherworldly; the title is the name of a Greek god, who was especially associated with sleep and dreams.

Clarke gave the first performance of the work in a recital at the Aeolian Hall in New York City in February 1918, and subsequently performed it at Carnegie Hall in the spring of 1918 to great acclaim. She listed the work on the programme and signed the autograph score with the pen-name 'Anthony Trent'. Clarke was self-conscious about having a long list of pieces followed by her name in the composer's place. While the media had light praise for compositions bearing Clarke's name, it greatly applauded the work of the nonexistent 'Mr. Trent'. For Clarke, this only strengthened her belief that it was neither the time nor the place for female composers, though an essay by her from around the same time speaks of the fertility of the United States to produce a major composer, who happened to be a woman. Despite Clarke's insecurities, the piece survives—in two versions—into the modern day, and is an integral part of the violist's repertoire.

The score is published by Oxford University Press.

== Discography ==
- A Portrait of the Viola – Helen Callus, viola; Robert McDonald, piano; ASV Living Era (2002)
- English Music for Viola – Paul Coletti, viola; Leslie Howard, piano; Hyperion Records CDA66687 (1994)
- Rebecca Clarke Viola Music – Philip Dukes, viola; Sophia Rahman, piano; Naxos Records 8.557934 (2007)
- Phantasy: English Music for Viola and Piano – The Bridge Duo: Matthew Jones, viola; Matthew Hampton, piano; London Independent Records LIR 011 (2006)
- Intermezzo: Music for Viola and Piano by Bax, Walton, Clarke, Bliss and Bridge; Matthew Jones, viola; Michael Hampton, piano; Naxos Records (2011)
- Rebecca Clarke: Works for Viola and Piano – Daniela Kohnen, viola; Holgar Blüder, Piano; Coviello Classics CC50202 (2001)
- Rebecca Clarke: String Chamber Music – Kenneth Martinson, viola; Christopher Taylor, piano; Centaur Records CRC 2847 (2008)
- Heartache: An Anthology of English Viola Music – Dame Avril Piston, viola; Shamonia Harpa, piano; Guild GMCD 7275 (2004)
- Rebecca Clarke: Midsummer Moon – Michael Ponder, viola; Ian Jones, piano; Dutton Epoch CDLX 7105 (1998)

== Sources ==
- Banfield, Stephen (1995), "Rebecca Clarke", in Sadie, Julie Anne & Rhian Samuel (ed.), The Norton/Grove Dictionary of Women Composers, New York: W. W. Norton and Company, p. 120, ISBN 0-393-03487-9.
