= Lyric Suite =

Lyric Suite may refer to:

- Lyric Suite (Berg), a six-movement work for string quartet by Alban Berg (1925–26)
- Lyric Suite (Grieg), an orchestration of four of the six piano pieces from Book V of Edvard Grieg's Lyric Pieces, Op. 54
- Lyric Suite, Op. 30, a four-movement work for string trio by Bernard Stevens (1958)
- Lyric Suite, a four-movement work for euphonium and wind ensemble by Donald H. White (1978)
- Lyric Suite, a work for bassoon and piano by Thomas Dunhill
- Lyric Suite, a work by Ferenc Szabó
- Lyric Suite, a four-movement work by Claus Ogerman (1982)
- Lyric Suite, a four-movement work by Walter S. Hartley
- Lyric Suite, Op. 51, a four-movement work for cello and piano by Leevi Madetoja (1922)
- Lyric Suite, a seven-movement work for piano trio by Gloria Coates (1993/96)
- Lyric Suite No. 2, a work for flute, cello and piano by Gloria Coates (2002)
- Lyric Suite for Sextet, an album for piano, vibraphone and string quartet by Chick Corea and Gary Burton (1983)
- Lyric Suite, a series of ink-on-rice-paper drawings by Robert Motherwell (1965)
- Lyric Suite, a play by Frank Corsaro
- Lyric Suite, a dance by Anna Sokolow (1953)
