= Robert Cogan =

American composer (1930–2021)

Robert Cogan (February 2, 1930 – August 19, 2021) was an American music theorist, composer and teacher.

== Career ==
He studied at the University of Michigan (B.M., 1951; M.M., 1952); Princeton University (M.F.A., 1956); Royal Conservatory of Brussels; Berkshire Music Center, Tanglewood; and the Staatliche Hochschule für Musik und Theater, Hamburg. His principal teachers included Nadia Boulanger, Aaron Copland, Ross Lee Finney, Philipp Jarnach and Roger Sessions.

For more than three decades Cogan was Chair of Graduate Theoretical Studies and Professor of Composition at New England Conservatory, Boston. He also was a visiting professor at the Berkshire Music Center; at State University of New York at Purchase; at the Central Conservatory of Music, Beijing, and Shanghai Conservatory; and at IBM Research.

As speaker and/or composer Cogan was programmed in Belgium, Brazil, Canada (Banff Festival), China, France (IRCAM), Paris; Avignon and Nice Festivals), Germany (Darmstadt International Summer Courses for New Music); North and West German Radios; Zinzig Festival; Bielefeld University), Great Britain (Universities of Edinburgh, London, and Southampton), Italy (Gubbio and Prix Italia festivals; Italian Society for Musical Analysis; Rockefeller Bellagio Study Center), Korea (Seoul Arts Olympics), the Netherlands (International Computer Music Association), Russia, Sweden (Swedish Institute for Electronic Music), Switzerland (Montanea Festival), and Yugoslavia (Belgrade Radio-Television). In the United States he appeared under the auspices of the American Society for Aesthetics; College Music Society; Ford, Morse, Rockefeller, and Rothschild Foundations; International Association for Semiotics; League of Composers; Music Educators National Conference; Music Teachers National Association; Society of Composers; Society for Ethnomusicology; and Society for Music Theory; as well as in universities throughout North America.

Performers of Cogan's works include the conductors Tamara Brooks, Lorna Cooke deVaron, John Heiss, Jacques-Louis Monod, Fredrick Prausnitz, Gunther Schuller, and Leopold Stokowski; the Cleveland Orchestra, Norddeutscher Rundfunk, and RIAS Berlin orchestras; pianists Geoffrey Burleson, Marilyn Crispell, David Del Tredici, David Hagan, Robert Henry, and Ellen Polansky; instrumentalists Esther Lamneck, Alexei Ludewig, and Stephanie Key; and singers Jan DeGaetani, Elizabeth Keusch, Joan Heller, Jane Bryden, and Maria Tegzes. His music appears on the Delos, Golden Crest, Leo, Music and Arts, Neuma, and Spectrum recording labels.

Cogan resided in Cambridge, Massachusetts, with his partner, composer and theorist Pozzi Escot.

== Selected compositions ==
Orchestral

- Fantasia for Orchestra (1951)
- Gulf Coast Bound, a multi-movement work for big band (1987)

Chamber music

- Sonata for viola and piano (1953)
- Two Compositions for String Trio (1960)
- Spaces and Cries for five brass instruments (1963)
- Soliloquy for saxophone and two percussionists (1987)
- Fierce Singleness for solo clarinet (1988)
- America Is for string quartet
- Events Dancing, Open-ended Folio for viola and piano (1989)
- Aflame in Flight for solo violin with text by William Carlos Williams (1999)

Organ

- No Attack of Organic Metals for organ (1973)

Piano

- Sou Nos & Variants for solo piano (1961)
- Contexts/Memories for piano (1982)
- Pemungkah for two acoustic and two electric pianos (1983)
- Costellar Pulsations for two pianists (1985)
- Algebra & Piano (1981–2000)

Vocal

- Whirl DS IS III: Mysterium Fragment for mixed chorus with two solo sopranos, oboe, clarinet, bassoon & cello (1969)
- Polyutterances for two solo voices, one of which may be pre-recorded (1989)
- Eight Poems of William Bronk for voice and piano (1998)

== Publications ==
- Cogan, Robert (1984): New Images of Musical Sound, Cambridge, Massachusetts: Harvard University Press
- Cogan, Robert and Escot, Pozzi: Sonic Design: The Nature of Sound and Music, Prentice Hall
- Cogan, Robert and Escot, Pozzi: Sonic Design: Practice and Problems, Publication Contact International (This won the Society for Music Theory's "Distinguished Publication Award" in 1987.)

He also published in numerous journals including College Music Symposium, Interface, Journal of Music Theory, The Musical Quarterly, Perspectives of New Music, and Sonus.
