= Gordon Bryan (pianist) =

British pianist and music examiner

- Born: 22 February 1895; London, England
- Died: 19 November 1957 (aged 62); London, England
- Occupation: Pianist

Gordon Bryan (22 February 1895 – 19 November 1957) was a British pianist, occasional composer and international music examiner.

Born in London, Bryan studied piano with Percy Grainger and Oscar Beringer. He was a frequent early broadcaster for the BBC at Savoy Hill. Bryan made his London debut as a pianist at the Royal Albert Hall in 1919. In 1924 he was a founding member of the Aeolian Players, with Joseph Slater (flute), Antonio Brosa (violin) and Rebecca Clarke (viola). Constance Izard took over as violinist in 1926. In October 1928 and again in 1929 he organized and performed in two all Ravel concerts at the Aeolian Hall in London with the composer present and participating.

His first performances included the Concerto for piano, strings, tenor and percussion by Arthur Bliss in 1923, E J Moeran's Bank Holiday at a South Place Sunday Concert in 1925, Lennox Berkeley's Clarinet Sonatine (with Frederick Thurston) in 1928, the premiere of Constant Lambert's Piano Sonata in 1929, and the first British performance of Ernest Schelling's Fantastic Suite for piano and orchestra in 1930. He composed a Suite for violin and piano, op. 1 (1922), two piano concertos, and also made numerous orchestral arrangements of keyboard sonatas by Handel and Domenico Scarlatti, including the Scarlattiana Suite for piano, strings and percussion.

Enjoying travel he toured widely at home and abroad, and from 1925 was a frequent examiner for the Associated Board - a job that took him to Australia, New Zealand, Canada, India and South Africa. On multiple trips to Scandinavia from the late 1940s he met Sibelius and became an authority on his piano music.

Bryan was unmarried and lived in Bournemouth (at 14, Marlborough Road) and he often performed there under the baton of Dan Godfrey. He was an amateur photographer and collector of musical portraits and objets d'art gathered on his travels. Taken ill in Singapore during an examining tour he was returned to London, where he died, aged 62.
