= Donald H. White =

American composer (1921–2016)

Donald H. White (February 28, 1921 – October 4, 2016) was a 20th-century American composer.

White was born in Narberth, Pennsylvania, in 1921. He studied music education at Temple University in Philadelphia and composition with Persichetti at the Philadelphia Conservatory of Music (1946) and with Bernard Rogers and Howard Hanson at the Eastman School of Music (1952). In 1947, he joined the faculty of DePauw University in Greencastle, Indiana, where he was chairman of composition and theory studies (1948–81). He was the director of the school of music at Depauw from 1974 to 1978. He became the chairman of the music department at Central Washington University in Ellensburg, Washington, in 1980.

White died at the age of 95 on October 4, 2016, and was interred at West Laurel Hill Cemetery in Bala Cynwyd, Pennsylvania.

== Compositions ==
He was best known for his Euphonium Suite, Trombone Sonata and Tetra Ergon, for bass trombone.

- Orchestra: Sagan, overture 1946; Kennebec Suite 1947; Overture 1951; Cello Concerto 1952; Divertimento No. 2 for Strings 1968
- Band: Ambrosian Hymn variants 1963; Terpsimetrics 1968; Concerto for Timpani winds and percussion 1973; Lyric suite for Euphonium and Wind Ensemble 1978; 4 Bagatelles 1989
- Chamber: Trumpet sonata 1946; 3 for 5 Woodwind quintet 1964; Serenade No. 3 for Brass Quintet 1965; Trombone Sonata 1966; Tetra Ergon, for Bass Trombone and Piano 1973; Tuba Sonata 1978; Quintet for Brass 1980
- Vocal: Song for Mankind for Soloists, Chorus and Orchestra 1970; From the Navajo Children for Chorus and Wind Ensemble 1978
