= Reflection (Britten) =

1947 composition by Benjamin Britten

- Chamber music by Benjamin Britten
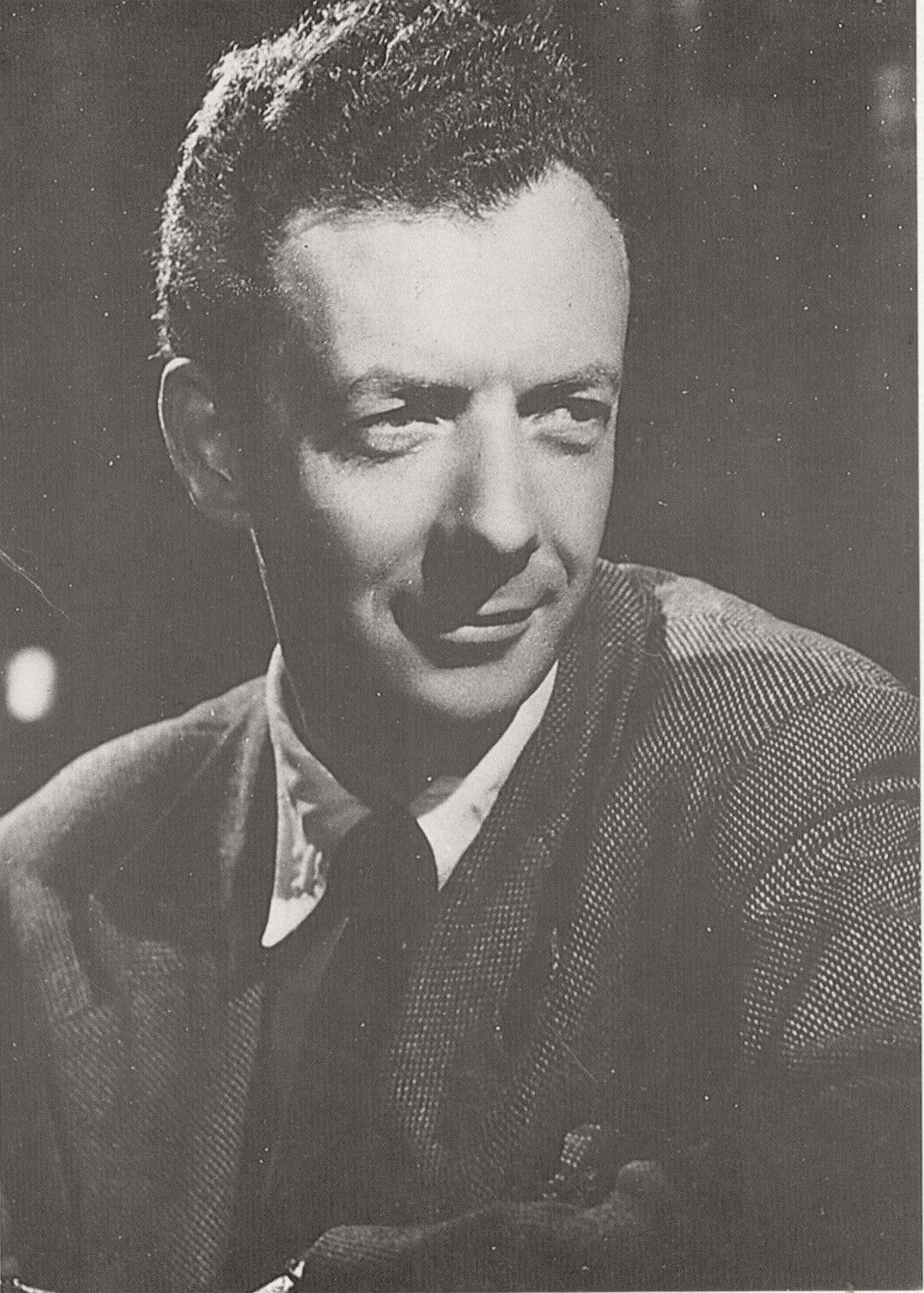
- Benjamin Britten in the 1940s
- Composed: 1930
- Performed: 28 November 1995
- Duration: 4 minutes
- Scoring: viola; piano

Reflection is a composition for viola and piano by Benjamin Britten, composed in 1930. It was published by Faber & Faber.

== Background and history ==
Britten was a competent player of both viola and piano, and his composition teacher Frank Bridge was also a professional violist. Britten composed Reflection as a work in a single movement on 1 October 1930. It was published by Faber & Faber.

Reflction was performed as part of a BBC broadcast by Philip Dukes and Sophia Rahman on 28 November 1995, and first performed on stage on 24 October 1996 at the Kleine Zaal of the Concertgebouw, Amsterdam, by Nobuko Imai and Ellen Corver. The duration is given as 4 minutes.

== Recordings ==
Reflection was recorded in 2013 in a collection Reflections of mostly youthful music by Britten for violin and viola, played by violist Matthew Jones and pianist Annabel Thwaite by Naxos Records. It was recorded also by violist Martinu Outram (viola) and pianist Julian Rolton in a collection, also named Reflections of viola music by Britten and his composition teacher Frank Bridge.
