= Helen Callus =

British violist

- Genres: classical music
- Occupation: violist
- Instrument: viola
- Website: Helen Callus's website

Helen Callus is a British violist who teaches at Northwestern University.

Callus studied with Ian Jewel at the Royal Academy of Music in London, earning an Honorary ARAM (Associate of the RAM). She then continued her studies at the Peabody Conservatory, where she served as the teaching assistant to Paul Coletti. At age 26, she was appointed to the faculty of the University of Washington, where she taught for seven years before accepting a position at UCSB. In 2016, she accepted the position of Professor of Viola at Northwestern University's Bienen School of Music.

Callus served as the President of the American Viola Society from 2005–2008. She has also served as the Viola Forum Editor for the American String Teachers Association Journal, and she founded BRATS (Bratsche Resources And Teaching in the Schools), an educational outreach organization.

== Recordings ==
Callus has made recordings with several labels, including ASV, Analekta, and Dutton Epoch.

- A Portrait of the Viola with Robert McDonald, piano (2002)
- ...Is But a Dream with Rebecca Henderson, oboe and Timothy Lovelace, piano (2004)
- In L'Istesso Tempo as a member of the Frank Bridge Ensemble with Gidon Kremer, violin; featuring music by Giya Kancheli (2005)
- Walton Viola Concerto with the New Zealand Symphony Orchestra (2006)
- Prokofiev: Romeo and Juliet with Philip Bush, piano (2007)
- Gordon Jacob: Complete Music for Viola & Orchestra with the BBC Concert Orchestra (2011)
- J.S. Bach: Six Cello Suites on Viola (2011)
- Bach - Krebs - Abel (2015)

== Sources ==
1. Northwestern University: Helen Callus named Professor of Viola
2. Biography: Helen Callus’s official website
3. Helen Callus: University of California, Santa Barbara
