= Ormandy =

Ormandy is a surname. Notable people with the surname include:

- Eugene Ormandy (1899–1985), Hungarian-American conductor and violinist
- Jack Ormandy (1912–1997), British footballer
- Neil Ormandy, British musician, songwriter and producer
- Tavis Ormandy, British computer programmer
