= Sonus (journal) =

- Discipline: Music composition, history, pedagogy, theory, journalism
- Language: English
- Edited by: Pozzi Escot

Publication details
- History: 1980–2019
- Publisher: Pozzi Escot
- Frequency: Biannually

Standard abbreviations
- ISO 4: Sonus

Indexing
- ISSN: 0739-229X
- LCCN: 84642989
- OCLC no.: 8289018

Links
- Journal homepage; Online table of contents

Sonus: Journal of Investigation Into Global Musical Possibilities is a peer-reviewed academic journal that covers musicology, music education, composition, theory, journalism, ethnomusicology, and other areas of the music and performing arts. It was co-founded in the fall of 1980 by American composers and music theoristsPozzi (Olga) Escot, Robert Cogan, Shirish Korde and Thomas DeLio. Escot became its editor-in-chief.
