= Pozzi Escot =

Peruvian-born American composer

Olga Pozzi-Escot Zapata (born 1 October 1933) is a Peruvian-born American composer, music theorist, and faculty member at the New England Conservatory in Boston, Massachusetts.

== Life ==
Pozzi Escot was born in Lima, Peru. Her father, Marius Emmanuel Pozzi Escot, was a French professor at the University of San Marcos in Lima, Peru; her mother was Lucía María Zapata Hurtado. After living in Peru, she went to France.

Back in Peru, between 1949 and 1953 she studied at the Academy of Music Sas-Rosay (Lima).

At the end of 1953, she emigrated to the United States to attend Reed College in Portland, Oregon, becoming a citizen three years later. Between 1954 and 1957 she studied at the Juilliard School (in New York), where she graduated with a degree in composition (1956) and Bachelor in Arts (1957).

She is a graduate of the Hochschule für Musik und Theater Hamburg.

She is author of The Poetics of Simple Mathematics in Music, co-author of Sonic Design: The Nature of Sound and Music and since 1980, Editor-in-Chief of the self-published music journal Sonus. She has written over thirty articles (mostly published in her own journal) developing and discussing the relationship between music and mathematics. Her works are recorded on Delos, Neuma, Spectrum, Leo, Music & Arts and Centaur labels and published by Publication Contact International.

Pozzi Escot resided in Cambridge, Massachusetts with her partner, composer and theorist Robert Cogan (1930–2021).
