= Persichetti =

Persichetti is a surname. Notable people with the surname include:

- Bob Persichetti (born 1970), American filmmaker, animator, and storyboard artist
- Vincent Persichetti (1915–1987), American composer, teacher, and pianist
