= Rebecca Clarke (composer) =

English composer and violist (1886–1979)

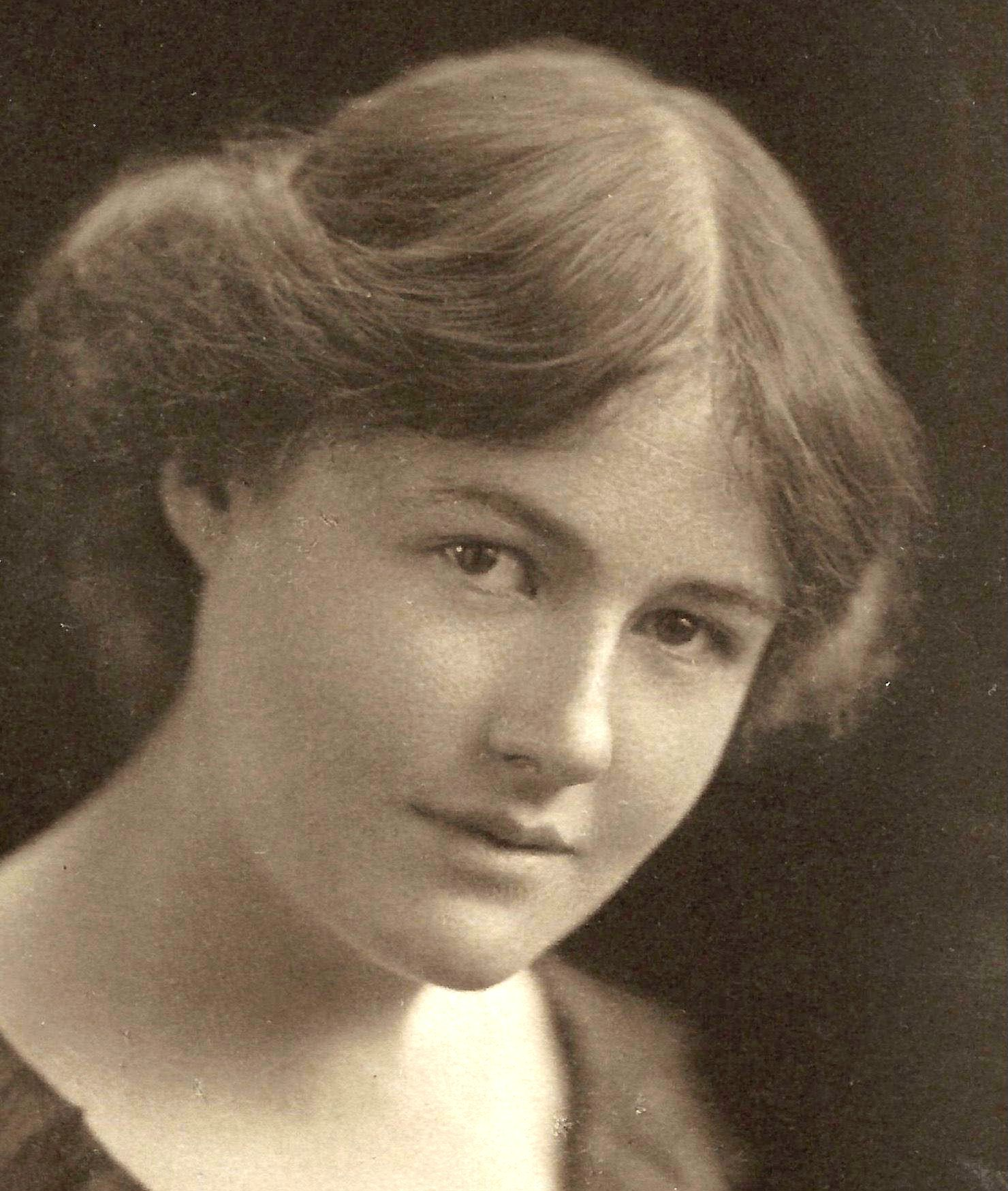
- Clarke, c. 1911
- Born: 27 August 1886; Harrow, England
- Died: 13 October 1979 (aged 93); New York City, US
- Occupations: Composer; violist
- Works: List of compositions
- Spouse: James Friskin (m. 1944; died 1967)

Rebecca Helferich Clarke (27 August 1886 – 13 October 1979) was a British classical composer and violist. Internationally renowned as a viola virtuoso, she also became one of the first female professional orchestral players in London.

Clarke had a German mother and an American father, and spent substantial periods of her life in the United States, where she permanently settled after World War II. She was born in Harrow and studied at the Royal Academy of Music and Royal College of Music in London. Stranded in the United States at the outbreak of World War II, she married composer and pianist James Friskin in 1944. Clarke died at her home in New York at the age of 93.

Although Clarke's output was not large, her work was recognised for its compositional skill and artistic power. Some of her works have yet to be published; those that were published in her lifetime were largely forgotten after she stopped composing. Scholarship and interest in her compositions revived in 1976. The Rebecca Clarke Society was established in 2000 to promote the study and performance of her music.

== Early life ==
Clarke was born in Harrow, England, to Joseph Thacher Clarke, an American, and his German wife, Agnes Paulina Marie Amalie Helferich. Her father was interested in music, and Clarke started on violin after sitting in on lessons that were being given to her brother, Hans Thacher Clarke, who was 15 months her junior. There was a family string quartet: Joseph playing cello, and Agnes, who was a pianist, playing viola, with Hans and Rebecca. Her father was abusive, often hitting her with a steel ruler over infractions such as biting her nails.

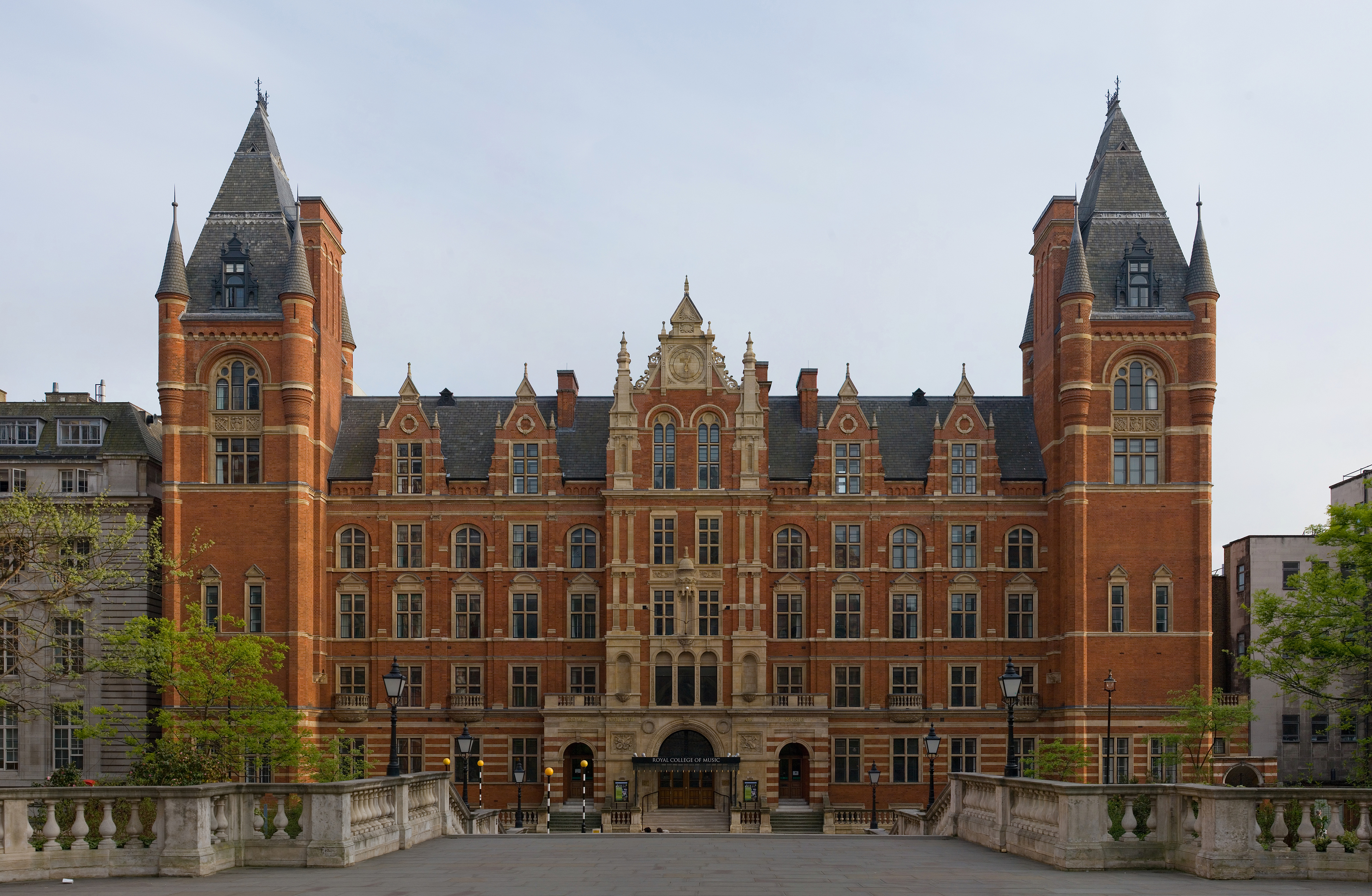
London's Royal College of Music, where Clarke studied from 1907 to 1910

Clarke started composing at an early age and began formal studies at the Royal Academy of Music in 1903, as a violin pupil of Hans Wessely. She did not enjoy the teaching, as she said in an interview at the end of her life, which involved the "book under the arm" method for correct bowing: already at the time it was considered an "old fashioned German" style of tuition. She was withdrawn by her father in 1905, after her harmony teacher Percy Hilder Miles proposed to her. Miles later left his Stradivarius violin to Clarke in his will.

Shortly after leaving the Royal Academy, Clarke made the first of many visits to the United States. She then attended the Royal College of Music, becoming Sir Charles Villiers Stanford's first female composition student. Her substantial Theme and Variations for piano dates from this period. At Stanford's urging she shifted her focus from the violin to the viola, just as the latter was coming to be seen as a legitimate solo instrument. She studied with Lionel Tertis, who was considered by some the greatest violist of the day. In 1910 she composed "Tears", a setting of Chinese poetry, in collaboration with a group of fellow students at RCM.

Clarke also sang under the direction of Ralph Vaughan Williams in a student ensemble called the Palestrina Society, which she organised with another student, the pianist Beryl Reeves. Reeves, the daughter of William Pember Reeves and Maud Pember Reeves, married Clarke's brother Eric in 1919.

== Orchestral musician and chamber ensembles in London ==
Following her criticism of his extra-marital affairs, Clarke's father turned her out of the house and cut off her funds. She had to leave the Royal College in 1910 and supported herself through her viola playing. Clarke, along with Jessie Grimson on violin, became one of the first female professional orchestral musicians in London when she was selected by Sir Henry Wood to play in the Queen's Hall Orchestra in 1913. She also participated in chamber groups during this period, including Nora Clench's female quartet.

Clarke was sought after as a violist, and was invited to the at-home chamber music recitals of Paul and Muriel Draper in Lisson Grove from 1911 to 1914; Paul Draper was an American tenor studying in London with Raimund von zur-Mühlen. Clarke played with Artur Schnabel, Pablo Casals, Jascha Heifetz, Jacques Thibaud, Guilhermina Suggia, Arthur Rubinstein, Pierre Monteux, and George Szell, among others.

== Touring 1916–1923 ==
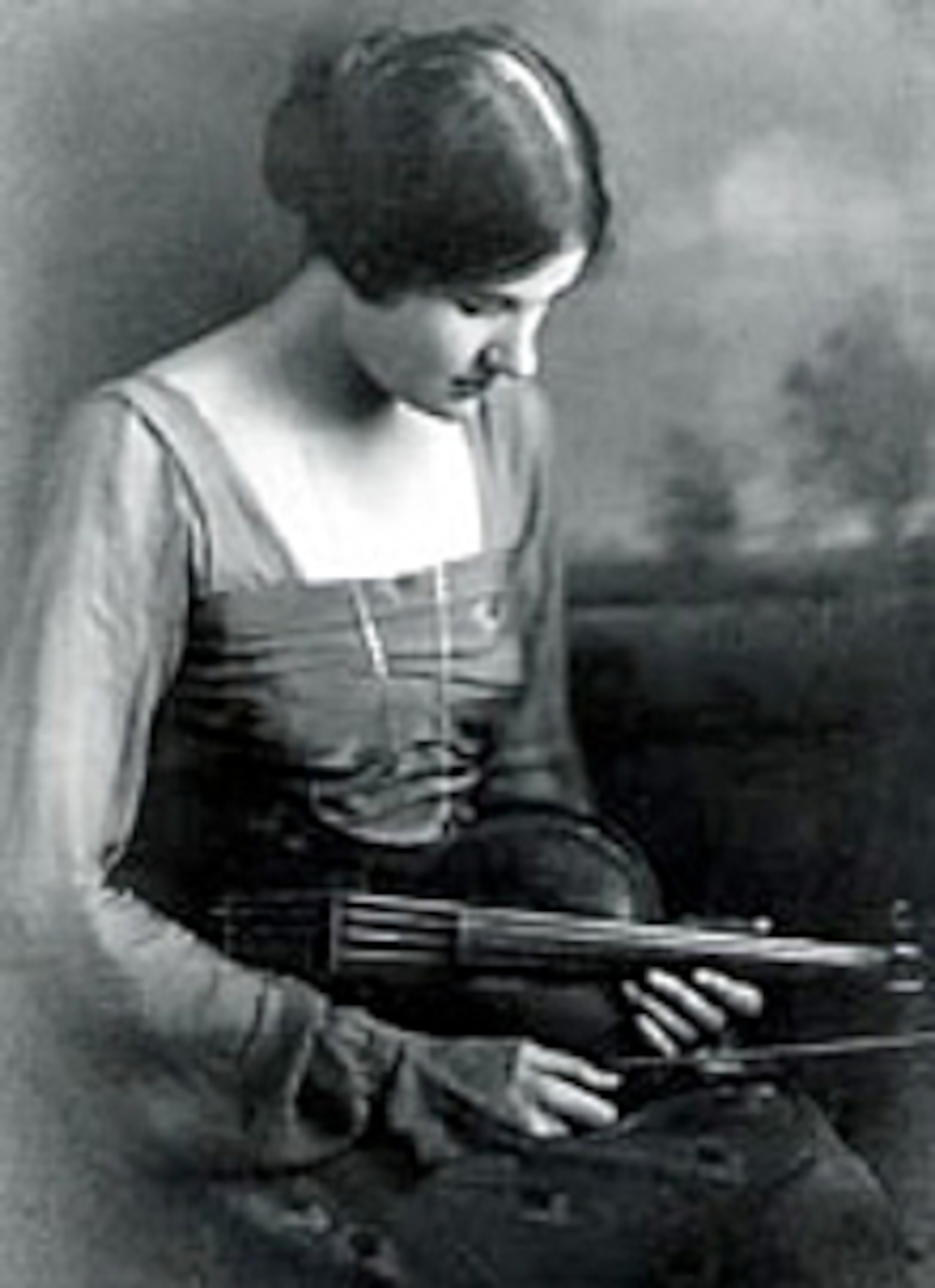
Clarke with a viola, c. 1919

In 1916 Clarke visited the United States, where some of her songs had been performed by Gervase Elwes. On this trip, she met Elizabeth Sprague Coolidge, a music patron. Marin Jacobson has suggested that the contact was through the pianist Gertrude Watson, a friend of Coolidge who had studied under Theodor Leschetizky, and who had toured with Clarke and the cellist May Mukle for the benefit of war relief. In 1918, Clarke premiered her short, lyrical piece for viola and piano titled Morpheus, composed under the pseudonym "Anthony Trent", at a joint recital with May Mukle in New York City. Reviewers praised Morpheus, if largely ignoring Clarke's other works.

Clarke continued to perform with May Mukle, in Hawaii in 1918 and 1919, and on a tour of the British colonies in 1923. Mukle was a good friend, and with Kathleen Long and Marjorie Hayward they later made up the English Ensemble piano quartet.

=== Compositions 1919 to mid-1920s ===
Clarke's compositional career peaked in a brief period, beginning with the viola sonata she entered in a 1919 competition sponsored by Elizabeth Sprague Coolidge. In a field of 72 entrants, Clarke's sonata tied for first place with a composition by Ernest Bloch; Coolidge gave Bloch her casting vote. Reporters speculated that "Rebecca Clarke" was a pseudonym for Bloch himself. The sonata was well received and had its first performance at the Berkshire music festival in 1919. In 1921 Clarke again made a good showing in Coolidge's competition with her piano trio. A 1923 rhapsody for cello and piano followed, sponsored by Coolidge, making Clarke the sole woman to receive Coolidge's patronage. These three works represent the height of Clarke's compositional career.

== Later life ==
Clarke, after completing a world tour in 1922–23, embarked upon a career as a solo and ensemble performer in London. In 1924 she became a founding member of the Aeolian Players. She was one of the Aeolian Hall ensemble conducted in October 1928 by Maurice Ravel, in a concert of his own works, with Gordon Bryan, Gwendolen Mason and others.

Clarke performed on several recordings in the 1920s and 1930s, and participated in BBC music broadcasts. Her compositional output greatly decreased during this period. However, she continued to perform, participating in the Paris Colonial Exhibition in 1931 as part of the English Ensemble. Between 1927 and 1933 she was romantically involved with the British baritone John Goss, who was eight years her junior and married at the time. He had premiered several of her mature songs, two of which were dedicated to him, "June Twilight" and "The Seal Man". Her "Tiger, Tiger", finished at the time the relationship was ending, proved to be her last composition for solo voice until the early 1940s.

In 1936 Clarke sold the Stradivarius she had been bequeathed to a dealer in New York. At the outbreak of World War II, Clarke was in the US visiting her two brothers, and was unable to obtain a visa to return to Britain. She lived for a while with her brothers' families and then in 1942 took a position as a governess for a family in Connecticut. She composed 10 works between 1939 and 1942, including her Passacaglia on an Old English Tune. She had first met James Friskin, a composer, concert pianist, and founding member of the Juilliard School faculty, and later to become her husband, when they were both students at the Royal College of Music. They renewed their friendship after a chance meeting on a Manhattan street in 1944 and married in September of that year when both were in their late 50s. According to the musicologist Liane Curtis, Friskin was "a man who gave [Clarke] a sense of deep satisfaction and equilibrium."

=== Later compositions ===
Clarke has been described by Stephen Banfield as the most distinguished British female composer of the inter-war generation. She is now established as one of the most important 'women composers' of her generation. However, as she told a journalist, "I would sooner be regarded as a 16th-rate composer than be judged as if there were one kind of musical art for men and another for women." However, her later output was sporadic. It has been suggested by Liane Curtis that Clarke had dysthymia, a chronic form of depression; the lack of encouragement—sometimes outright discouragement—she received for her work also made her reluctant to compose. Clarke did not consider herself able to balance her personal life and the demands of composition: "I can't do it unless it's the first thing I think of every morning when I wake and the last thing I think of every night before I go to sleep." After her marriage, she stopped composing, despite the encouragement of her husband, although she continued working on arrangements until shortly before her death. She also stopped performing.

== Last years and death ==
In 1963 Clarke helped establish the May Mukle prize at the Royal Academy of Music. It is awarded annually to an outstanding cellist.

After her husband's death in 1967, Clarke began writing a memoir, titled I Had a Father Too (or the Mustard Spoon); it was completed in 1973 but never published. In it she describes her early life, marked by frequent beatings from her father and strained family relations which affected her perceptions of her proper place in life. She had stopped performing after her marriage. In the 1970s, as interest rose in her music, tonal compositions and in women composers, she gave a few more performances in New York.

Clarke died on 13 October 1979 at her home in New York City at the age of 93, and was cremated.

== Compositions ==
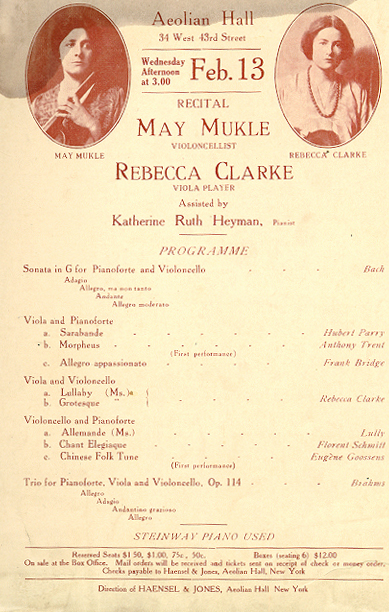
A 1918 program showcasing Clarke's work. Here, her duet Morpheus is credited to the pseudonym "Anthony Trent".

A large portion of Clarke's music features the viola, as she was a professional performer for many years. Much of her output was written for herself and the all-female chamber ensembles she played in, including the Norah Clench Quartet, the English Ensemble, and the d'Aranyi Sisters. She also toured worldwide, particularly with cellist May Mukle. Several trends in 20th-century classical music strongly influenced her works. Clarke also knew many leading composers of the day, including Bloch and Ravel, with whom her work has been compared.

The impressionism of Debussy is often mentioned in connection with Clarke's work, particularly its lush textures and modernistic harmonies. The Viola Sonata (published in the same year as the Bloch and the Hindemith Viola Sonata) is an example of this, with its pentatonic opening theme, thick harmonies, emotionally intense nature, and dense, rhythmically complex texture. The Sonata remains a part of the standard repertoire for the viola. Morpheus, composed a year earlier, was her first expansive work, after over a decade of songs and miniatures. The Rhapsody that Coolidge sponsored is Clarke's most ambitious work: it is roughly 23 minutes long, with complex musical ideas and ambiguous tonalities contributing to the varying moods of the piece. In contrast, "Midsummer Moon", written the following year, is a light miniature, with a flutter-like solo violin line.

In addition to her chamber music for strings, Clarke wrote many songs. Nearly all of Clarke's early pieces are for solo voice and piano. Her 1933 "Tiger, Tiger", a setting of Blake's poem "The Tyger", is dark and brooding, almost expressionist. She worked on it for five years to the exclusion of other works during her tumultuous relationship with John Goss and revised it in 1972. Most of her songs, however, are lighter in nature. Her earliest works were parlour songs, and she went on to build up a body of work drawn primarily from classic texts by Yeats, Masefield, and A. E. Housman.

During 1939 to 1942, the last prolific period near the end of her compositional career, her style became more clear and contrapuntal, with emphasis on motivic elements and tonal structures, the hallmarks of neoclassicism. Dumka (1941), a recently published work for violin, viola, and piano, reflects the Eastern European folk styles of Bartók and Martinů. The "Passacaglia on an Old English Tune", also from 1941 and premiered by Clarke herself, is based on a theme attributed to Thomas Tallis which appears throughout the work. The piece is modal in flavor, mainly in the Dorian mode but venturing into the seldom-heard Phrygian mode. The piece is dedicated to "BB", ostensibly Clarke's niece Magdalen; scholars speculate that the dedication is more likely referring to Benjamin Britten, who organised a concert commemorating the death of Clarke's friend and major influence Frank Bridge. The Prelude, Allegro, and Pastorale, also composed in 1941, is another neoclassically influenced piece, written for clarinet and viola (originally for her brother and sister-in-law).

Clarke composed no large scale works such as symphonies. Her total output of compositions comprises 47 songs, 3 arrangements, 11 choral works, and 25 instrumental pieces (including the Piano Trio, and the Viola Sonata). Her work was all but forgotten for a long period of time, but interest in it was revived in 1976 following a radio broadcast in celebration of her ninetieth birthday. Some of Clarke's compositions remain unpublished and in the personal possession of her heirs, along with most of her writings. However, in the early 2000s more of her works were printed and recorded. Examples of recent publications include her sonata in G major and sonata for violin and piano in D major, both published in 2023.

Modern reception of Clarke's work has been generally positive. A 1981 review of her Viola Sonata called it a "thoughtful, well constructed piece" from a relatively obscure composer; a 1985 review noted its "emotional intensity and use of dark tone colours". Andrew Achenbach, in his review of a Helen Callus recording of several Clarke works, referred to Morpheus as "striking" and "languorous". Laurence Vittes noted that Clarke's "Lullaby" was "exceedingly sweet and tender". A 1987 review concluded that "it seems astonishing that such splendidly written and deeply moving music should have lain in obscurity all these years".

The Viola Sonata was the subject of BBC Radio 3's Building a Library survey on 17 October 2015. The top recommendation, chosen by Helen Wallace, was by Tabea Zimmermann (viola) and Kirill Gerstein (piano). In 2017 BBC Radio 3 devoted five hours to her music as Composer of the Week. A compilation recording of Clarke's songs was released for the first time by Kitty Whately, Nicholas Phan and Anna Tilbrook in 2025.

== Legacy ==
At the beginning of the 21st century, it was common knowledge that many of Clarke's compositions remained unpublished, while others were out of print. The Prelude, allegro and pastorale: for B♭ clarinet and viola had been published for the first time, by Oxford University Press. A 2002 review in the Journal of the American Viola Society noted that the editor Christopher Johnson "now holds the rights to the works in the Clarke estate." The Rebecca Clarke Society had been established in September 2000 to promote performance, scholarship, and awareness of the works of Rebecca Clarke.

The head of the Rebecca Clarke Society, Liane Curtis, is the editor of A Rebecca Clarke Reader, originally published by Indiana University Press in 2004. The book was withdrawn from circulation by the publisher following Johnson's complaints about the unlicensed reproduction of substantial excerpts from Clarke's unpublished writings. The Reader has since been reissued by the Rebecca Clarke Society itself.

== Selected works ==
Chamber music

- 2 Pieces: Lullaby and Grotesque for viola (or violin) and cello (c. 1916)
- Morpheus for viola and piano (1917–1918)
- Sonata for viola and piano (1919)
- Piano Trio (1921)
- Rhapsody for cello and piano (1923)
- Passacaglia on an Old English Tune for viola (or cello) and piano (?1940–1941)
- Prelude, Allegro and Pastorale for viola and clarinet (1941)

Vocal

- Shiv and the Grasshopper for voice and piano (1904); words from The Jungle Book by Rudyard Kipling
- Shy One for voice and piano (1912); words by William Butler Yeats
- He That Dwelleth in the Secret Place (Psalm 91) for soloists and mixed chorus (1921)
- The Seal Man for voice and piano (1922); words by John Masefield
- The Aspidistra for voice and piano (1929); words by Claude Flight
- The Tiger for voice and piano (1929–1933); words by William Blake
- God Made a Tree for voice and piano (1954); words by Katherine Kendall

Choral

- Music, When Soft Voices Die for mixed chorus (1907); words by Percy Bysshe Shelley
