= Paul Coletti =

Scottish chamber musician (born 1959)

Paul Coletti (born 1959 in Edinburgh) is a Scottish viola soloist and chamber musician. He has performed throughout the world, making solo appearances at the Sydney Opera House, Queen Elizabeth Hall (London), and Teatro Colón (Buenos Aires, Argentina). He has performed Béla Bartók's Viola Concerto with Yehudi Menuhin conducting and has recorded Robert Schumann's Märchenbilder and Rebecca Clarke's Sonata for Viola, to some acclaim.

== Biography ==
Coletti was born in 1959 in Edinburgh, Scotland, to Italian parents. He began playing viola from the age of eight, while at St Mary's York Lane Primary School, and studied at the Royal Scottish Academy, the International Menuhin Music Academy, and the Juilliard School. He lives in Los Angeles with his wife, violist Gina Warnick, and their two daughters, and teaches viola and chamber music at the Colburn Conservatory.
