= Viola Sonata (Rebecca Clarke) =

1919 composition by Rebecca Clarke

- by Rebecca Clarke
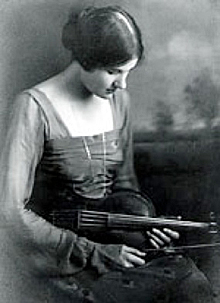
- The composer with viola in 1919
- Based on: poem by Alfred de Musset
- Performed: 1919
- Published: 1921
- Movements: three

Rebecca Clarke composed the Sonata for Viola and Piano in 1919, when the composer was 33 years old. She had been supporting herself with some success as a soloist. The majority was composed between April and July 1919.

== Career ==
The first reference to the Viola Sonata was upon its submission to a composition competition sponsored by Clarke's neighbour, Elizabeth Sprague Coolidge. Out of 72 entries, Clarke's Sonata tied for first with a piece by the Swiss composer Ernest Bloch. In the end Bloch was declared the winner, despite all the judges favouring Clarke—it was decided that declaring Clarke the winner would smack of favouritism on Coolidge's part. Clarke later said in an interview that she remembered a critic speculating that "Rebecca Clarke" was the pen-name of a male composer, as they could not imagine the possibility of a competent woman writing such music.

== Premiere ==
The piece had its première at the Berkshire Music Festival in 1919, and was well received. It, along with the Piano Trio of 1921 and the Rhapsody for cello and piano of 1923, represent the zenith of her compositional career. The sonata was first published in 1921 by Chester Music.

Clarke gives us an incipit on the first page of the sonata, a quote from La Nuit de mai (1835) by the French poet Alfred de Musset:

Poète, prends ton luth; le vin de la jeunesse Fermente cette nuit dans les veines de Dieu.	Poet, take up your lute; the wine of youth this night is fermenting in the veins of God.

The sonata is cast in three movements.

- The first movement, marked Impetuoso, begins with a vibrant fanfare from the viola, before moving on into a melodic and harmonic language reminiscent of Claude Debussy and Ralph Vaughan Williams, two important influences on Clarke's music. Her language is at times very chromatic, and shows the invention of Debussy in the use of modes and the whole-tone scale.
- The second movement, marked Vivace, makes use of many interesting 'special effects' like harmonics and pizzicato.
- The final movement, Adagio, is both pensive and sensual in its language. However, Clarke works in a special surprise: a segue into a restatement of themes from the first movement. The sonata ends in a lush and brilliant pyrotechnical display, showing off the full range of the viola, as well as the piano (whose part is of equal difficulty).

Because of the many different obstacles the piece presents, as well as its highly idiomatic writing, it is becoming more and more a staple of the violist's repertoire.

== Orchestration ==
The Rebecca Clarke Society commissioned an orchestration of the Viola Sonata from composer Ruth Lomon. It was premiered in 2007 by violist Peter Sulski. Subsequent performances have featured soloists Esra Pelivahnli, Catherine Hanson, and Melissa Matson.
