= Carl Valentin Wunderle =

German-American Musician and Composer

Carl Wunderle pictured circa 1907

Carl Valentin Wunderle (April 13, 1866 - February 16, 1944) was a German-American musician and composer. He was a child prodigy in music, and spent his entire adult life playing violin and viola in major U.S. orchestras in Chicago, Pittsburgh, and Cincinnati, while at the same time maintaining a separate concertizing career. He played numerous instruments including the viola d'amore, for which he wrote several compositions.

== Early life in Germany ==
Carl Valentin Wunderle was born on 13 April 1866 in Melleck, Kingdom of Bavaria, a small village in the mountains just south of Munich on the Austrian border. He lived in Munich for at least part of his youth. Little is known about his parents, but it is clear that they had the means, the know-how, and the drive to promote their three musically talented children as "child wonders." Beginning in early 1882 when Carl was 15 years old, he and his brother Constantine, age 14, and his sister Minna, age 13, formed the "Wunderkind" Trio. They spent six years performing together. Carl played the violin, and also accompanied his siblings on the piano when they sang duets. Constantine also played the zither, and Minna the guitar. All three children gave recitations. The Wunderkind trio toured throughout Europe, performing in Germany, Austria, Russia, Spain and England before kings, countesses, and nobles.

Carl was also a student at the Hochschule für Musik und Theater München in Munich, Germany from 1880 to 1886. While there he studied and that he studied violin under a man named Brückner (not Anton Bruckner) and eventually also counterpoint under Josef Rheinberger. His fellow students included the likes of Richard Strauss and Horatio Parker.

In 1888, when Carl was 21 years old, the Wunderkind trio disbanded, and he continued his professional career in a number of European orchestras. In 1888 he played with the Exposition Orchestra in Munich. In 1889 he was concert master of the Kurhaus Orchestra in Bad Kissingen. In 1890 he played with the Meininger Court Orchestra in Meiningen. In 1891 he was at the Hochschule in Berlin where he studied under Joseph Joachim, and he spent the summer of that year as the concert master of the Kurhaus Orchestra in Riga, Russia (now Latvia). In 1892 he was with the Exposition Orchestra in Vienna and later with the Hans von Bülow Orchestra in Hamburg.

== Symphony career in the United States ==
Carl Wunderle emigrated to America on 15 April 1893 to play in an orchestra at the World's Columbian Exposition in Chicago, Illinois, which opened its doors two weeks after his arrival. He enjoyed telling people that he was recruited for this by Florenz Ziegfeld, who later went on to fame as the producer of the Ziegfeld follies. This means he must have started at the Exposition by playing for Ziegfeld's father, Dr. Florenz Ziegfeld, Senior. Dr. Ziegfeld was the founder and president of the Chicago Musical College, and had opened a night club at the Fair called the Trocadero, where he wanted to entertain people with classical music. Ziegfeld, Sr. had sent his son to Europe in the fall of 1892 to recruit talent for this undertaking.

The official orchestra at the World’s Columbian Exposition was under the direction of Theodore Thomas, who was also the music director of the Chicago Symphony Orchestra. It seems likely that Wunderle ended up playing in Thomas's Exposition orchestra, as well, because he became a member of the Chicago Symphony Orchestra later that same year.

Carl Wunderle had married a fellow German, Margaretha Winzer, by the time he joined the Chicago Symphony Orchestra in 1893. She was a professional harpist, who also played in the Exposition orchestra in 1893, and also became a member of the Chicago Symphony Orchestra that same year.

Wunderle played in the Chicago Symphony Orchestra until the death of its director, Theodore Thomas, in January 1905. At that time Carl and Margaretha and their new baby moved to Pittsburgh, Pennsylvania, where Carl, and eventually also Margaretha joined the Pittsburgh Orchestra under the direction of Emil Paur. Within two years, Carl and Margaretha were divorced. In 1907, Carl moved back to Chicago and rejoined the Chicago Symphony Orchestra under the direction of Thomas's successor, Frederick Stock. Carl had played viola and percussion during his first stint with the Chicago Symphony Orchestra. When he came back, he played 1st violin.

Carl remarried, this time for life, in March 1907. He and his second wife, Elizabeth, went on to have three children.

In 1910, Carl and his family moved to Cincinnati, Ohio, where he joined the Cincinnati Symphony Orchestra, playing under Leopold Stokowski. Carl remained with the Cincinnati Orchestra for 32 years until his retirement in 1941. Carl died on 16 February 1944.

== Other musical activities ==
In addition to his symphony work, Carl Wunderle built a reputation for himself as a performer, musical educator, and composer. He performed professionally in various ensembles including the Wunderle String Trio, where he played violin. He performed with this and other ensembles on the Chautauqua circuit in the 1910s.

Carl was also well known for promoting early music. He gave concerts and lecture recitals on such instruments as the viola d'amore, the viola pomposa, and the ravanastron, and would often dress in period costumes for these occasions. He claimed to have mastered 19 different musical instruments during his lifetime.

== Compositions ==
Published works by Carl Wunderle include

- American Fantasia für die Harfe. Chicago: Lyon & Healy, 1903. Repository: Music and Dance Library, Harold B. Lee Library, Brigham Young University, Provo, Utah, USA. Digital copy available from Brigham Young University.
- Swedish Fantasy for viola d'amore. Edited by Dr. Gordon Childs, and published as a Viola d'amore Society of America Edition.
- Homage à Spohr for viola d'amore. Edited by Dr. Gordon Childs, and published as a Viola d'amore Society of America Edition.

Manuscript works by Carl Wunderle include

Compositions and arrangements for the viola d'amore which were donoted by John and Pearl Poellet to the [New York Public Library for the Performing Arts] at Lincoln Center and are housed with the Walter Voigtlander Collection there. The works of Carl Wunderle in this collection include:

Manuscript Compositions

- Fantasie Suedoise (Swedish Fantasy) for Viola d'amore and Piano
- American Fantasie for Harp
- Concertino Op. 47, "Homage a Spohr" for Viola d'amore and Harpsichord

Manuscript Arrangements

- Concerto for Viola d'amore and Lute - Vivaldi (Score and Parts. Arr. 1: Violin I & II, Bass, Viola d'amore, Lute part transcribed for Viola. Arr. 2: Largo Movement for Viola d'amore, Flute, 3 Violins, Violincello, Cembalo)
- Baroque Dances derived from Violin, Cello and Keyboard Suites - Bach (Gavotte, Siciliano, Praeludio, Sarabande I, Sarabande II)
- Cavatina "Se pel rigor" from La Juive for Viola d'amore and Piano - F. E. Halevy
- Sonata da Camera Op. 6 No. 3 for Viola d'amore and Cembalo - Locatelli (Andante, Minuetto con Altro, Allegro)
- Concerto for Viola da Gamba & Continuo arr. Viola d'amore and Piano - G. Tartini (Poco largo, Allegro moderato, Grave, Finale allegro)
- Valse for Viola d'amore and Piano - Brahms
- Theme & Variations for Viola d'amore and Piano - P. Locatelli
- "Celeste Cecile," Meditation Religioso for Viola d'amore and Harp - C. Miris
- 2nd Tarantella, "La Belle Napolitaine" for Viola d'amore & Piano - G. Papini (piano part missing)
- Confidence for solo Viola d'amore - H. Engelmann
- Ballet No 52 from Orpheus for Viola d'amore & Cembalo - C. W. Gluck
- Chaconne from Orpheus for Viola d'amore, Flute or Violin - C. W. Gluck (Viola da Gamba or Violincello, Cembalo)
