= Five-string violin =

String instrument

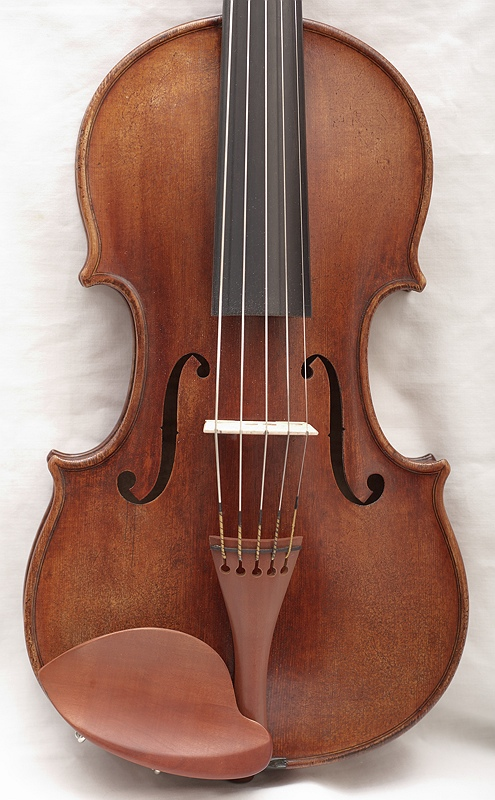
A five string violin bears strong structural resemblance to a traditional violin.

A five-string violin is a variant of violin with an extra string tuned below the violin's usual range. In addition to the G, D, A, and E strings of a standard violin, a five-string violin typically includes a lower C string. Violins with 6 or more strings may add a low F, low B♭, low E♭, or a soprano violin high A (sometimes a high B).

The five-string violin was created to combine the pitch ranges of the violin and viola. Bobby Hicks, a noted bluegrass fiddler, popularized the five-string violin in 1963, first showcasing his modification during a performance in Las Vegas. José Herrando wrote 6 Sonatas for the 5 string Violin (or 5 string Viola a.k.a. Grand Viola, or Viola Pomposa) and continuo. Due to the size limitations of a five-string violin, the low C string typically resonates with a slightly softer sound than the other strings. Five-string violas (a.k.a. Viola pomposa), normally tuned C, G, D, and A, and adding a high E string, have in the same tuning, but on a viola body and do not sound as squeaky. Capable players may be able to compensate for these shortcomings with technique, and electric instruments help these issues with the benefit of amplification. It is also possible for a luthier to create instruments that resolve the issue by adjusting the size of the instrument.

== Structure ==
The components that make up a five-string violin are very similar to those found on a traditional violin, with the shape of the body and neck of a five-string violin closely resembling that of a traditional violin. The strings are typically tuned to C3, G3, D4, A4 and E5. The body, though still smaller than a viola, may be slightly wider and deeper to improve the resonance of the C string. It features a larger pegbox to accommodate the fifth string.

== Uses ==
Five-string violins excel in musical styles that allow for improvisation because of their wide range and versatility. They are most commonly used in country fiddling, swing, and jazz music. Players of this instrument favor its ability to play pieces written for either violin or viola, as well as new pieces that utilize the combined ranges of those instruments. The five-string violin can also play cello music an octave higher than written, making it very versatile.
