= Louis van Waefelghem =

Belgian violinist, violist

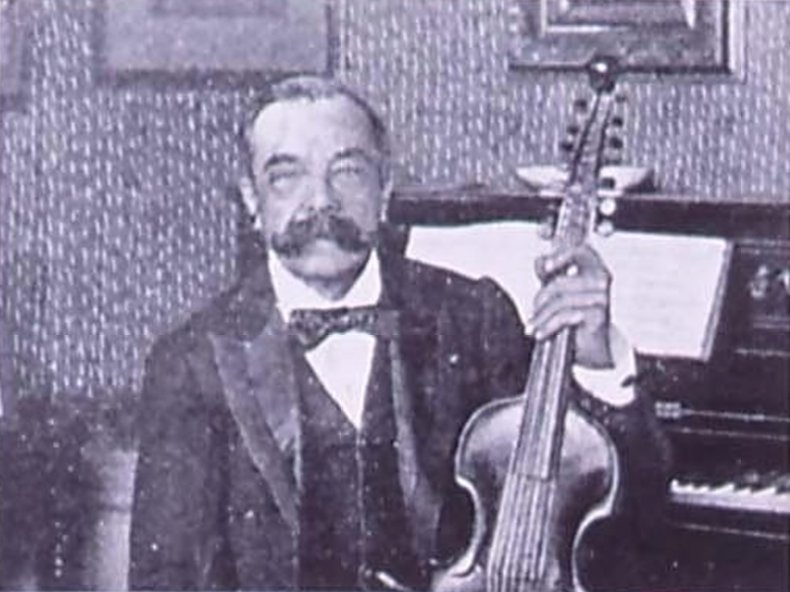
Louis van Waefelghem

Louis van Waefelghem (13 January 1840, in Bruges – 19 June 1908, in Paris) was a Belgian violinist, violist and one of the greatest viola d'amore players of the 19th century. He also composed several works and made transcriptions for viola and viola d'amore.

Waefelghem was educated at the Athénée Royal in Bruges and then studied violin with Lambert Joseph Meerts at the Koninklijk Conservatorium in Brussels. After finding success as a violinist in Germany and at the Opera House in Budapest, he moved to Paris in 1863 to pursue a career as a performer on viola and viola d'amore. He played in the orchestra of the Paris Opera in 1868 and also in the Pasdeloup Orchestra. Waefelghem was Examiner of the Viola at the Conservatoire de Paris before Théophile Laforge was appointed the first Professor of Viola in 1894. His reputation as a gifted violist quickly spread and, after the Franco-Prussian War (1870–1871), he traveled to London where he played in the Royal Opera orchestra and at chamber concerts of the Musical Union with Joseph Joachim, Leopold Auer, Henri Vieuxtemps, Camillo Sivori, Pablo de Sarasate, and others. From 1875 he was the violist of the Quatuor Marsick, along with Guillaume Rémy, Jules Delsart and founder Martin Pierre Marsick, one of the best and most famous string quartets in Paris of the time. He also a member of the Quatuor Geloso and of Ovide Musin's quartet with Metzger and Vander Gucht. Waefelghem was the principal violist with the Orchestre Lamoureux from 1881 to 1895.

In 1895, Waefelghem, along with colleagues Laurent Grillet (hurdy-gurdy), Louis Diémer (harpsichord), and Jules Delsart (viola da gamba), founded the Société des Instruments Anciens. The ensemble gave their début at the Salle Pleyel in Paris on 2 May 1895, and performed throughout Europe with great success. Thereafter, Waefelghem devoted himself entirely to the revival and study of the viola d'amore. He quickly became one of the greatest viola d'amore players of the 19th century, and being a highly enthusiastic researcher, he restored the complete library of music for the instrument which had sunk into oblivion, to the world.

== Selected works ==
=== Original compositions ===
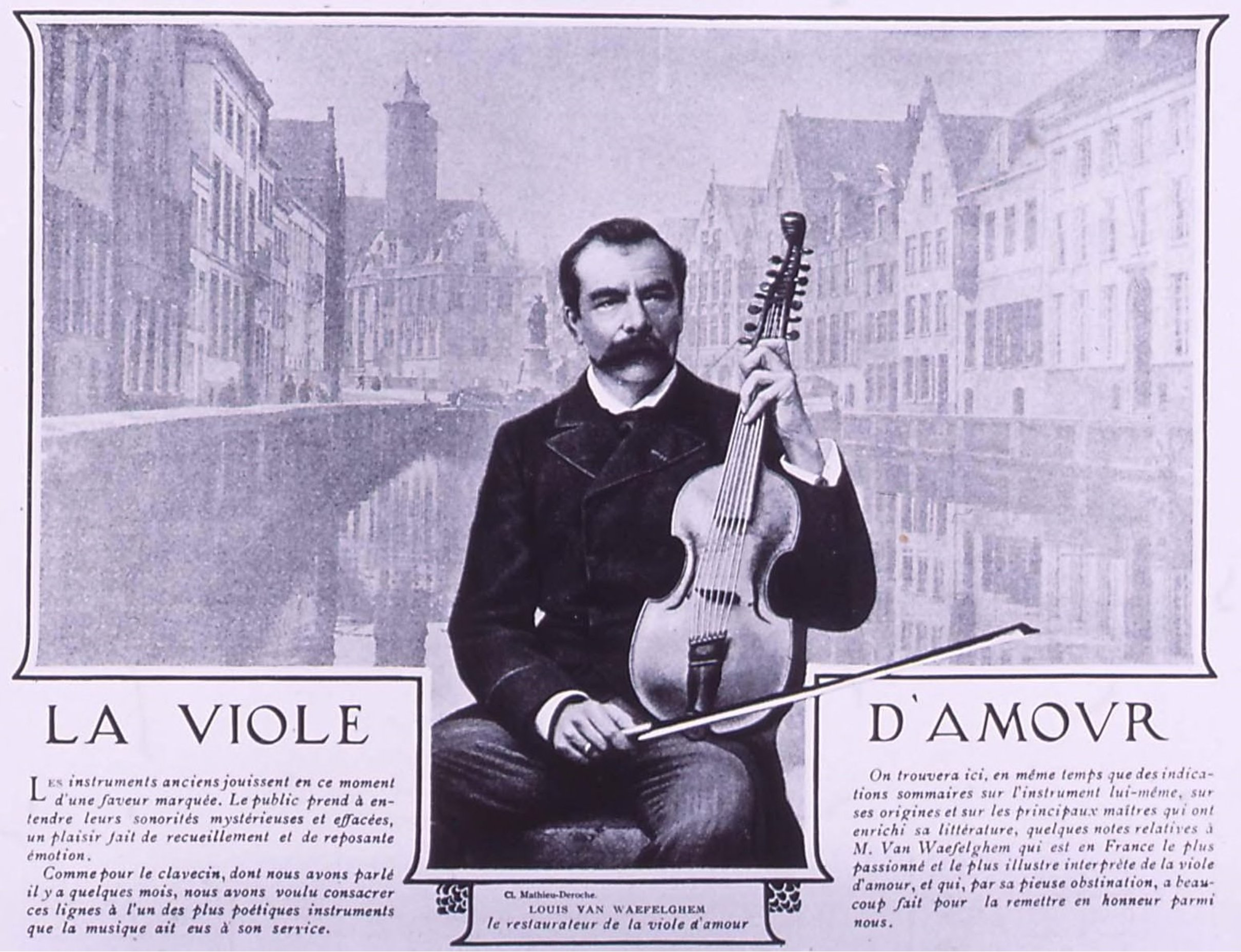
Louis van Waefelghem with viola d'amore

- Pastorale in G major for violin and piano (1875)
- Rêverie for violin and piano (1875)
- Romance in D major for violin or viola d'amore and piano (1891)
- Soir d'automne (Autumn Evening), Melody for viola d'amore or viola and piano or harp (1903)

=== Transcriptions and editions ===
- Attilio Ariosti (1666–1729)

Sonata No. 2 for viola d'amore or viola and piano (1715); original for viola da gamba and basso continuo; transcription (1896)

- Marin Marais (1656–1728)

Chaconne for viola d'amore or viola and piano (1686); original for viola da gamba and basso continuo; transcription (1893?)
Sarabande for viola d'amore or viola and piano (1686); original for viola da gamba and basso continuo; transcription (1893?)

- Jean Paul Égide Martini (1741–1816)

Plaisir d'amour (1784) for viola d'amore or viola and piano (c.1888)

- Louis-Toussaint Milandre (18th century)

Andante et menuet (1770) for viola d'amore or viola and piano (1889?)

- Camille Saint-Saëns (1835–1921)

Le cygne (The Swan) from The Carnival of the Animals (1886) for viola or viola d'amore and piano (1895?)
Sérénade in F♯ minor for viola d'amore or viola and piano, Op. 16 No. 2 (1862); original for cello and piano

- Alessandro Scarlatti (1660–1725)

Aria "Vaga rosa tenerella" (1680) for voice, viola d'amore or viola and harpsichord or piano (1899)

- Charles-Marie Widor (1844–1937)

Andante from the Organ Symphony No. 8, Op. 42 No. 4 (1887) for viola d'amore or viola and piano (1895?)

== Dedications ==
- René de Boisdeffre (1838–1906) – Rêverie for viola d'amore (or violin, or viola, or cello) and string orchestra with harp or piano, Op. 55 (1890?)
- Alphonse Duvernoy (1842–1907) – Lied in A minor for viola and piano, Op. 47 (1901)
- Théodore Gouvy (1819–1898) – Sérénade vénitienne in E minor for viola and piano (1875)
- Léon Pillaut (1833–1903) – Pièce caractéristique in D major for viola d'amore and piano (1892)

== Discography ==
- The Art of Viola d'Amore – Louis van Waefelghem: Romance for viola d'amore and harp; Pierre-Henri Xuereb (viola d'amore), Fabrice Pierre (harp); Classic Talent DOM 2910 58 (2001)

== Sources ==
- Heron-Allen, Edward; Waldo Seldon Pratt; Charles Newell Boyd; John Alexander Fuller-Maitland (1910). Grove's Dictionary of Music and Musicians, Volume V. Macmillan Publishers. p. 286.
