= Alix Young Maruchess =

American violist

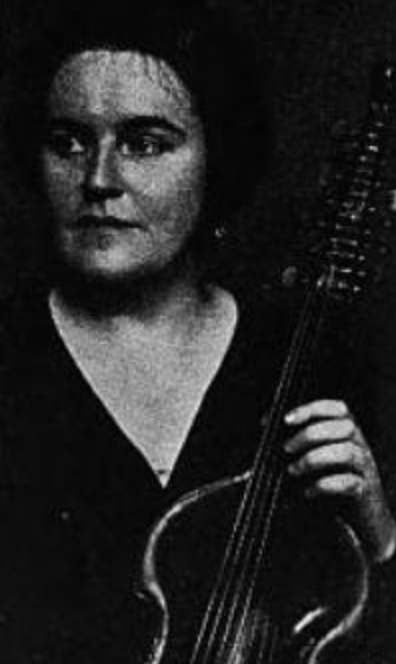
- Alix Young Maruchess, from a 1929 advertisement
- Born: Alix Young; 28 March 1889; Edinburgh, Scotland
- Died: 27 February 1973 (age 83); Harrison, New York, U.S.
- Occupation: Violist
- Spouse: Boris Maruchess

Alix Young Maruchess (28 March 1889 – 27 February 1973) was a Scottish-born American musician. She played viola and viola d'amore in concerts from the 1920s into the 1960s.

== Early life and education ==
Alix Young was born in Edinburgh, Scotland. She studied with Otakar Ševčík, Mikhail Press, and Leopold Auer. She acquired an Amati viola d'amore in Europe as a young woman, and made it her specialty.

== Career ==
Maruchess was based in New York City by 1917, and gave recitals at Steinway Hall in 1927, 1928, 1929, and 1939. and at Town Hall in 1931. She toured widely in the 1930s, including performances in Carmel in 1934 and 1935, at the Textile Museum in Washington, D.C., in 1936, and at Bennington College in 1937. She returned to Carmel in 1947 and 1953, to play at the Carmel Bach Festival.

From the 1930s onward, Maruchess was frequently in Santa Fe, New Mexico, where she socialized with Witter Bynner, Gerald Cassidy, Ina Sizer Cassidy, Amelia Elizabeth White, violinist Eunice Hauskins, and others in the arts. While in Santa Fe, she began playing the cello in concerts. She was founding conductor of Sinfonietta, the city's amateur chamber music group, and returned to Santa Fe in 1953 to perform with Sinfonietta.

William Zorach drew a portrait of Maruchess with her viola. In the 1940s she played a kithara with the experimental Harry Partch Ensemble. In 1962, she performed with the Brooklyn String Orchestra in Chappaqua, with Lily Nyeboe conducting.

== Personal life ==
Alix Young married labor arbitrator Boris Maruchess; they had a daughter, Graeme, born in 1914. Her husband died in 1938. Maruchess died in 1963, at the age of 83, in Harrison, New York.
