= Plaisir d'amour =

1784 French song

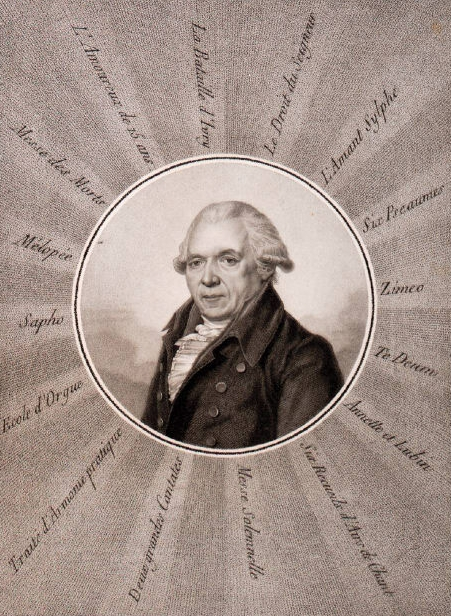
Music by Jean-Paul-Égide Martini (1741–1816)

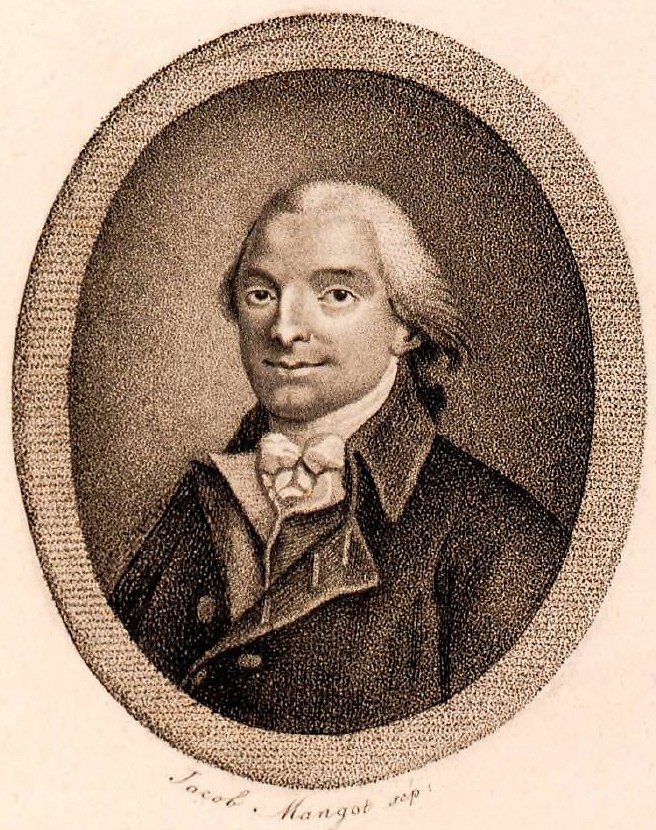
Lyrics by Jean-Pierre Claris de Florian (1755–1794)

"Plaisir d'amour" (pronounced [plɛziʁ damuʁ]; "Pleasure of Love") is a classical French love song written in 1784 by Jean-Paul-Égide Martini (1741–1816); it took its text from a poem by Jean-Pierre Claris de Florian (1755–1794), which appears in his novel Célestine.

The song was greatly successful in Martini's version. For example, a young woman, Madame Julie Charles, sang it to the poet Alphonse de Lamartine during his cure at Aix-les-Bains in 1816, and the poet recalled it 30 years later.

Hector Berlioz arranged it for orchestra (H134) in 1859. Louis van Waefelghem arranged the tune for viola d'amore or viola and piano in the 1880s. It has been arranged and performed in various pop music settings.

== Recordings ==
- Yvonne Printemps in 1931 for His Master’s Voice
- Rina Ketty in 1939 (with extended lyrics)
- Paul Robeson in 1940
- Joan Baez in 1961
- The Seekers and Judith Durham in 1964 or 1993 concert
- Marianne Faithfull on her debut-album Marianne Faithfull in 1965
- Mary Hopkin in Welsh as "Pleserau Serch", 1971
- Mireille Mathieu on her album Les grandes chansons françaises (1985)
- Gabriel Yacoub on disc 9 Chansons d'Amore of the multi-volume Anthologie de la chanson française recorded in 1992–1994
- The Kings Singers in 1993, on their album Chansons D'amour
- Judy Collins on her 2000 album Classic Folk
- Jacky Terrasson on his 2000 album A Paris...
- Charlotte Church Live in Jerusalem 2001
- Nana Mouskouri and Charles Aznavour on the album Nana & Friends – Rendez-vous (2012)
- Nick Drake recorded it in 1971 (released in 2012)

== In popular culture ==
Hermann Hesse's short story "Chagrin d'Amour" (1908) narrates a fictional origin for this song at a medieval tournament. Hesse has it composed by an obscure troubadour named Marcel, who sings this song to a queen named Herzeloyde to express his hopeless and unrequited love for her. Hesse took the names of the characters from Wolfram von Eschenbach's Parzival.

The tune is heavily featured as a theme to the 1939 feature film Love Affair starring Charles Boyer and Irene Dunne, with Dunne also performing the song within her role as a singer

The song served as the main theme of, and was sung by Montgomery Clift in, the 1949 movie The Heiress.

The opening sequence of the Christmas comedy film We're No Angels (1955), directed by Michael Curtiz and starring Humphrey Bogart, contains the song "Ma France Bien-Aimée" which borrows the music of "Plaisir d'amour".

The melodies for Elvis Presley's "Can't Help Falling in Love" (1961) and the 20th century Christian hymn "My God Loves Me" are based on "Plaisir d'amour".

Mado Robin's version of the song plays in Djibril Diop Mambéty's 1973 film Touki Bouki when Nori and Anta go to visit a rich patron's estate in order to convince him to fund their trip to Paris. It is repeated a few times more throughout the remainder of the film.

A church choir performs this song for exhausted members of Easy Company in the episode entitled "The Breaking Point" in HBO's acclaimed miniseries Band of Brothers.

In the 1966 movie Batman, the song was being performed by an on-stage singer (Julie Gregg) in a romantic restaurant that Bruce Wayne (Adam West) had unwittingly taken Catwoman (Lee Meriwether) to on a date, thinking she was the Russian journalist "Kitayna Ireyna Tatanya Kerenska Alisoff".

The song accompanies the theme of lost love in the Welsh TV sports comedy film Grand Slam, as an elderly widower revisits the scene of a wartime romance in Paris during a trip to watch rugby. Instrumental sequences recur frequently and phrases are sung by a character
