= Pierre-Henri Xuereb =

French violist (born 1959)

Pierre-Henri Xuereb (born 1959) is a French violist, performer on both the viola d'amore and the grand'viola.

== Biography ==
A student of Serge Collot at the Paris Conservatory, at the age of 16 he received first prize in viola. Following this he studied for a time in the United States with William Primrose and Walter Trampler, both at the Juilliard School and Boston University, from which latter he received his Bachelor of Music degree in 1982.

In 1980 Xuereb took a position performing with the Ensemble intercontemporain of Pierre Boulez, leaving the group in 1982. Since 1989 he has taught his instrument at the Paris Conservatory and at the École normale de musique de Paris. He teaches frequent master classes, and appears with the Patrick Gallois Quintet and the Ensemble Alternance; he also teaches at the Royal Conservatory of Liège.

With the luthier Friedrich Alber Xuereb has designed a five-string viola called the grand'viola; he has used it to perform works for forgotten instruments such as the Sonate per grand'viola e orchestra of Niccolò Paganini, the Arpeggione Sonata of Franz Schubert, and the Sixth suite for viola pomposa of Johann Sebastian Bach. His discography runs to around twenty recordings, and he is noted for his championship of contemporary classical music. He is the first musician to record the 24 Preludes for viola d'amore and harp by Henri Casadesus.
