= Chaplin Trio =

English trio of musicians

The Chaplin Trio was a trio of musicians: sisters Eleanor Mary (or Nellie) Chaplin, pianist and harpsichordist; Kate Chaplin, violinist and player of the viola d'amore; and Mabel Chaplin, cellist and player of the viola da gamba. They are particularly known for contributing to the revival of early music.

== Careers ==
The sisters were born in London.

- Nellie Chaplin (11 February 1857 – 16 April 1930) studied at the London Academy of Music with Henry Wylde, and in Hamburg with Elise Timm.
- Kate Chaplin (3 July 1865 – 9 December 1948) studied at the London Academy of Music with Adolf Pollitzer, and from 1892 to 1894 at the Royal Conservatory of Brussels with Eugène Ysaÿe.
- Mabel Chaplin (19 October 1870 – 6 November 1960) studied at the London Academy of Music with the cellist Alessandro Pezze, and at the Royal Conservatory of Brussels with Édouard Jacobs.

Nellie and Kate Chaplin gave concerts together from 1882. In 1889, the sisters formed the Chaplin Trio. With other performers, they gave concerts in London (in venues including the Queen's Hall, St James's Hall and the Steinway Hall) and elsewhere in Britain and Ireland. In the early years of the trio, they played music of the classical period and of the 19th century. A reviewer of a concert given in St James's Hall in May 1902, during which they played a trio by Brahms, wrote that the trio "have long since made a name for themselves as intelligent and interesting players.... The effects of continuous practice are very evident in their playing, and their ensemble was excellent." (The Times, 17 May 1902).

The sisters were also teachers.

=== Early music ===
From the early twentieth century they played early music. One such concert, in 1906, of works by J. S. Bach, Purcell, William Boyce, Domenico Scarlatti and others, took place in the Broadwood Rooms in London. A reviewer wrote that the music was played "with just the right feeling, quite simply and straightforwardly, like everything else that these players gave us, and without the slightest pose or attempt at archaism...." (The Times, 19 May 1906). They sometimes played on early instruments: Kate Chaplin played a viola d'amore (named "The Dragon") made by George Saint-George in 1899, and Mabel Chaplin played a viola da gamba.

In a revival in 1920 of The Beggar's Opera, at the Lyric Theatre, Hammersmith, the sisters, playing harpsichord, viola d'amore e viola da gamba, and other musicians formed the orchestra. The production ran until 1923. The BBC transmitted concerts given by the trio: broadcasts on 17 August 1927 and on 13 September 1929 are known.

Concerts by the trio are known until 1929, shortly before Nellie Chaplin's death in 1930.
