= Vadim Borisovsky =

Russian violist (1900–1972)

Vadim Vasilyevich Borisovsky (Russian: Вадим Васильевич Борисовский; 19 January 1900 – 2 July 1972) was a Soviet-Russian violist.

== Biography ==
Born in Moscow, Borisovsky entered Moscow Conservatory in 1917 studying the violin with Mikhail Press. A year later, on the advice of violist Vladimir Bakaleinikov, Borisovsky turned his attentions to the viola. He studied with Bakaleinikov and graduated in 1922. Borisovsky became Professor of Viola at the conservatory in 1925. Varvara Gaigerova dedicated her Suite for Viola, op. 8 to him.

Between 1922 and 1923, Borisovsky and colleagues from the Moscow Conservatory formed the Beethoven Quartet. He was the quartet's violist until 1964. There are many recordings of Borisovsky with the Beethoven Quartet.

Borisovsky was also a viola d'amore player. He arranged, transcribed and edited more than 250 compositions for viola and viola d'amore.

He died in Moscow in 1972, aged 72.

== Original compositions ==
- Concert Etude (Концертный этюд) in A major for viola solo (published 1981)
- Vulcan: Sicilian Tarantella (Сицилийская тарантелла “Вулкан”) for viola and piano (1962)

== Arrangements and transcriptions ==
=== Harp ===
For harp solo

Original composer	Russian title (original title)	English title	Publication date	Remarks
anonymous (16th century)	Парижские колокола	Paris Bells	1962	
anonymous	Скерцо: "Перезвон"	Scherzo: "Carillon" (1650?)	1962	
Robert de Visée	Траурная аллеманда	Allemande funèbre	1962	original for lute
Sylvius Leopold Weiss	Прелюдия	Prelude	1962	

=== Viola d'amore ===
For viola d'amore and piano unless otherwise noted

Original composer	Russian title (original title)	English title	Publication date	Remarks
Louis de Caix d'Hervelois	Непостоянный; Грациозная; Менуэт; Гавот	L'inconstant; La gracieuse Menuet; Gavotte	1928	transcription date 1926; originals for viola da gamba and continuo; alternate parts for violin and cello
Tommaso Giordani	Мадригал	Madrigal "Caro mio ben"	1936	original for voice; also for viola and piano; false attribution to Giuseppe Giordani
François Joseph Gossec		Tambourin	1934	
Franz Anton Hoffmeister		Divertimento for viola d'amore solo, 2 horns, 2 violins and basso	1934	viola d'amore and piano reduction by Cornelis Kint
Alexander Krein	Пролог	Prologue	1962	
Friedrich Wilhelm Rust		Aria con Variazioni	1934	original for viola d'amore and basso; reduction by Cornilius Kint

=== Viola ===
For viola and piano unless otherwise noted

Original composer	Russian title (original title)	English title	Publication date	Notes
Alexander Alyabyev	Рондо	Rondo	1973	
Anatoly Alexandrov	Ария из "Классической сюиты"	Aria	1937	original from Classic Suite, Op. 32 (1928) for orchestra
Fikret Amirov	Элегия	Elegy	1962	
anonymous (18th century French)	Контрданс	Contredanse	1980	
Anton Arensky	Вальс	Valse	1974	
Johann Sebastian Bach	Адажио из Органного концерта No. 3	Adagio	1960	original from Organ Concerto No. 3
Johann Sebastian Bach	Ария из Кантаты No. 5: "Пролейся скорее, источник священный..."	Ergieße dich reichlich, du göttliche Quelle from Cantata No. 5 for tenor, viola and piano (1724)	1977	original for tenor, viola and continuo
Johann Sebastian Bach	Упражнение для органной педали	Pedal Study for viola solo	1932	original for organ
Wilhelm Friedemann Bach	Весна	Die Frühling	1961	original for clavier
Natalya Baklanova (1902–1985) (Наталья Владимировна Бакланова)	Русская Народная Песня: «Не белы то снеги»	Russian Folk Song: "The Snow Is Not White"	1953	
Natalya Baklanova (1902–1985) (Наталья Владимировна Бакланова)	Русская Народная Песня: Прялка «Против красна солнышка»	Russian Folk Song	1953	
Natalya Baklanova (1902–1985) (Наталья Владимировна Бакланова)	Русская Народная Песня: Плясовая	Russian Folk Song: Dance	1953	
Béla Bartók	Багатель, Соч. 6 No. 2	Bagatelle, Op. 6 No. 2, Sz. 38 (1908)	1975	original for piano
Ludwig van Beethoven	Адажио кантабиле, Соч. 13	Adagio cantabile, Op. 13	1961	original: movement II from Sonata Pathétique for piano
František Benda	Соната D-dur для двух альтов и фортепиано	Sonata in D major for 2 violas and piano		original for 2 violins and continuo
Georges Bizet	Адажиэтто из сюиты "Арлезианка"	Adagietto from "L'Arlésienne"	1980	original for orchestra
Georges Bizet	Интермеццо	Intermezzo	1980	original for orchestra from the incidental music L'Arlésienne
Luigi Borghi	Соната No. 1, Соч. 5	Sonata No. 1, Op. 5		original for violin and basso continuo
Dmitry Bortniansky	Сонатное аллегро	Sonata Allegro	1967	original for piano
Johannes Brahms	Вальс	Waltz in A major, Op. 39 No. 15 (1865)	1936	original for piano 4-hands
Antonio Bartolomeo Bruni	Школа для Альта	Viola Method	1937	
Pyotr Bulakhov	Баркарола для двух альтов и фортепиано	Barcarolle in D major for 2 violas and piano	1950	original for 2 voices and piano
Pyotr Bulakhov	Канцонетта	Canzonetta in C major	1946	transcription dated 1943
Ernest Chausson	Интерлюдия	Interlude	1980	original for orchestra from Poème de l'amour et de la mer, Op. 19
Frédéric Chopin	Этюд, Соч. 25 No. 2	Étude, Op. 25 No. 2 (1837)	1971	original for piano
Frédéric Chopin	Прелюдия, Соч. 28 No. 14	Prélude for viola solo, Op. 28 No. 14	1932	original for piano
Frédéric Chopin	Вальс	Waltz in A minor, Op. 34 No. 2	1950	original for piano
Alexander Dargomyzhsky	Элегия	Elegy	1949	original: Не спрашивай, зачем: Элегия (Do Not Ask Why), Elegy for voice and piano (1844); words by Alexander Pushkin
Karl Davydov	Романс, Соч. 23	Romance sans paroles in G major, Op. 23	1953	original for cello and piano
Claude Debussy	Лунный свет (из "Бергамасская сюита")	Clair de lune	1956	original from Suite bergamasque (1890, 1905) for piano
Claude Debussy	В лодке (из "Маленькая сюита")	En Bateau	1956	original from Petite Suite (1886–1889) for piano 4-hands
Claude Debussy	Прелюд "Девушка с волосами цвета льна"	Prelude "La fille aux cheveux de lin"	1936	original for piano
Louis Delune (1876–1940)	Дождь	La Pluie jabote... (The Rain...)	1980	original for cello and piano
Carl Ditters von Dittersdorf	Концертная симфония ре-мажор "Двойной концерт"	Sinfonia Concertante in D major for viola, double bass and orchestra, K. 127	1962	
Alexandre Dubuque	Тарантелла	Tarantella	1973	
Balys Dvarionas	Тема с вариациями	Theme and Variations for viola and orchestra (1946)	1957	original for bassoon and orchestra
Andrey Esaulov (1800–c.1850) (Андрей Петрович Есаулов)	Вальс меланхолической	A Melancholic Waltz in E♭ minor	1946	transcription dated 1942
Gabriel Fauré	Ноктюрн	Nocturne in G major	1980	original for string orchestra from the incidental music Shylock, Op. 57 (1889)
Varvara Gaigerova	Сюита	Suite for viola and piano, Op. 8	1969	
Iosif Genishta (1795–1853) (Иосиф Иосифович Геништа)	Соната	Sonata for viola or clarinet and piano, Op. 9	1961	
Tommaso Giordani	Мадригал	Madrigal	1936	transcription of Caro mio ben; original for voice; also for viola d'amore and piano
Alexander Glazunov	Песнь трубадура	Chant du Ménestrel, Op. 71 (1900)	1957	original for cello and piano or orchestra
Alexander Glazunov	Грезы	Rêverie in D♭ major, Op. 24 (1890)	1948	original for horn and piano
Reinhold Glière	Ноктюрн, Соч. 35 No. 10	Nocturne, Op. 35 No. 10	1946	original for horn and piano
Reinhold Glière	Русская песня, Соч. 34 No. 15	Russian Song in E minor, Op. 34 No. 15	1958	original for piano; also published in 1961 as Romance, Op. 34
Reinhold Glière	Вальс, Соч. 45 No. 2	Waltz, Op. 45 No. 2	1946	original from 12 Easy Pieces (12 Легких пьес), Op. 45 for violin and piano
Mikhail Glinka	Баркарола	Barcarolle	1952	original for piano
Mikhail Glinka	Детская полька	Children's Polka (Polka Enfantine)	1952	original for piano
Mikhail Glinka	Мазурка	Mazurka	1948	original for piano
Mikhail Glinka	Ноктюрн "Разлука"	Nocturne "La Séparation"	1948	original for piano
Mikhail Glinka	Вариации на тему романса А. Алябьева "Соловей"	Variations on Alyabyev's Romance "The Nightingale"	1973	original for piano
Mikhail Glinka	Неоконченная соната	Viola Sonata in D minor (1825–1828)	1932	completed by Borisovsky
Christoph Willibald Gluck	Гавот	Gavotte	1937	original from the ballet Don Juan (1761)
Alexander Goedicke	Соната No. 1 (ля-мажор), Соч. 10 (1899)	Sonata No. 1 in A major, Op. 10 (1899)	1959	original for violin and piano; viola part also arranged by Mikhail Vladimirovich Reytikh
Enrique Granados	Интермеццо	Intermezzo	1936	original for piano
Edvard Grieg	Элегия, Соч. 38 No. 6	Elegy (Elegi), Op. 38 No. 6	1935	original from Lyric Pieces, Op. 38 for piano
Edvard Grieg	Поэма, Соч. 43 No. 5	Poème (Erotik), Op. 43 No. 5	1950	original from Lyric Pieces, Op. 43 for piano
Edvard Grieg	Песня Сольвейг, Соч. 55 No. 4	Solveig's Song (Solveigs Sang), Op. 55 No. 4 (1875)	1971	original for orchestra from Peer Gynt Suite No. 2
Alexandr Griboyedov	Вальс	Waltz in D minor	1946	transcription dated 1942
Johann Wilhelm Hässler (Гесслер)	Элегия	Elegy	1936	
Joseph Haydn	Менуэт	Menuet	1950	
Kara Karayev	Адажио (Китайский танец)	Adagio (Chinese Dance)	1962	from the ballet Seven Beauties (1952)
Kara Karayev		Gypsy Dance		from the ballet Seven Beauties (1952)
Aram Khachaturian	Ноктюрн из музыки к драме М. Ю. Лермонтова "Маскарад"	Nocturne	1980	from the incidental music for Masquerade (1941)
Aram Khachaturian	Вальс из музыки к драме М. Лермонтова "Маскарад" для двух альтов и фортепиано	Waltz in A minor for 2 violas and piano	1959	from the incidental music for Masquerade (1941) transcribed 1958
Ivan Khandoshkin	Концерт до-мажор	Concerto in C major for viola and orchestra (1801)	1947	piano reduction and cadenzas also by Borisovsky; Attributed to Khandoshkin but is now thought to be written by Mikhail Goldstein. See Musical hoax.
Ivan Khandoshkin	Вариации на русскую песню "То теряю, что люблю"	Variations on a Russian Song of Love	1955	original for violin and cello, Op. 4 No. 2
Ivan Laskovsky (1799–1855) (Иван Федорович Ласковский)	Ноктюрн, Соч. 27	Nocturne in B♭ major, Op. 27	1973	original for piano
Franz Liszt	Ноктюрн	Notturno: Liebestraum No. 3, S. 541 (1850)	1963	original for piano
Franz Liszt	Поэма		1963	
Franz Liszt	Прощание		1963	
Franz Liszt	Романс	Romance	1966	
Franz Liszt	Сонет Петрарки No.104	Sonetto 104 di Petrarca, S. 158 No. 2 (1844–1845)	1966	original for piano
Franz Liszt	Сонет Петрарки No.123	Sonetto 123 di Petrarca, S. 158 No. 3 (1844–1845)	1966	original for piano
Jean-Baptiste Lully	Две пьесы (из оперы "Атис"): 1. Ариозо; 2. Гавот	2 Pieces: 1. Arioso; 2. Gavotte	1936	from the opera Atys (1676)
Anatoly Lyadov	Прелюдия	Prelude, Op. 11 No. 1	1950	original from 3 Morceaux, Op. 11 (1886) for piano
Felix Mendelssohn	Песня без слов "Весенняя песня"	Song without Words "Frühlingslied" (Spring Song), Op. 62 No. 6	1958	original for piano
Felix Mendelssohn	Песня без слов	Song without Words, Op. 85 No. 1	1958	original for piano
Louis-Toussaint Milandre	Анданте и Менуэт	Andante et Menuet (1770)	1980	
Modest Mussorgsky	Гопак (из оперы "Сорочинская ярмарка")	Hopak	1936	from the opera The Fair at Sorochyntsi (1874–1880)
Nikolai Myaskovsky	Конец сказки	Dernière du Conte, Op. 74 No. 6 (1947)	1953	original for piano from 6 Morceaux-impromptus (Шесть Импровизации), Op. 74
Nikolai Myaskovsky	Соната No. 2	Sonata No. 2 in A minor, Op. 81 (1948)	1960	original for cello and piano
Vladimir Odoevsky	Вальс	Waltz in G major	1946	transcription dated 1942
Sergei Prokofiev	Кошка	The Cat	1962	from Peter and the Wolf, Op. 67 (1936)
Sergei Prokofiev	Свадьба Киже	Kijé's Wedding	1980	from the film Lieutenant Kijé, Op. 60 (1934)
Sergei Prokofiev	Колыбельная	Lullaby	1962	from the oratorio On Guard for Peace (На страже мира), Op. 124 (1950)
Sergei Prokofiev	Пьесы из балета "Ромео и Джульетта" Вступление Улица просыпается Джульетта-Девочка Менуэт: Съезд гостей Танец рыцарей Меркуцио Сцена у балкона Карнавал Танец с мандолинами для двух альтов и фортепиано Ромео и Джульетта у патера Лоренцо Меркуцио умирает Утренняя серенада для двух альтов и фортепиано Сцена прощания (Прощание перед разлукой) и Смерть Джульетты	Pieces from the Ballet "Romeo and Juliet", Op. 64 Introduction The Street Awakens The Young Juliet Menuet: Arrival of the Guests Dance of the Knights Mercutio Balcony Scene Carnaval Dance with Mandolins for 2 violas and piano Romeo and Juliet Meet Friar Laurence Death of Mercutio Morning Serenade for 2 violas and piano Farewell Scene (Farewell before Parting) and Death of Juliet	1961; 1961; 1961; 1967; 1961; 1961; 1961; 1977; 1977; 1967; 1977; 1977; 1977	Carnaval is taken from No. 24 Dance of the Five Couples.
Sergei Rachmaninoff	Мелодия, Соч. 3 No. 3	Mélodie, Op. 3 No. 3 (1892)	1984	original for piano from Morceaux de fantaisie
Sergei Rachmaninoff	Прелюдия, Соч. 23 No. 4	Prelude, Op. 23 No. 4 (1903)	1950	original for piano
Sergei Rachmaninoff	Не пой, красавица..., Соч. 4 No. 4	Sing Not to Me, O Lovely One for voice, viola and piano, Op. 4 No. 4 (1890–1893)	1977	original for voice and piano; words by Alexander Pushkin
Sergei Rachmaninoff	Соната соль-минор, Соч. 19	Sonata in G minor, Op. 19 (1901)	1950	original for cello and piano
Maurice Ravel	Павана на смерть инфанты	Pavane pour une infante défunte (1899)	1929	original for piano
Nikolai Rimsky-Korsakov	Полет шмеля (из оперы "Сказка о царе Салтане")	Flight of the Bumblebee (1899–1900)	1984	original for orchestra from the opera The Tale of Tsar Saltan
Nikolai Rimsky-Korsakov	Песня Индийского гостя (из оперы "Садко")	Song of the Indian Guest	1962	original for tenor and orchestra from the opera Sadko (1896)
Gioachino Rossini	Альпийская пастушка (из "Музыкальные вечера")	La Pastorella dell' Alpi		No. 6 from Les soirées musicales; original for soprano and piano
Gioachino Rossini	Скерцо	Scherzo in D major	1962	
Alessandro Rolla	Концертный этюд	Étude de Concert in G major	1962	original for viola solo
Friedrich Wilhelm Rust	Соната (соль-мажор)	Sonata in G major for viola and continuo	1935	
Franz Schubert	Экспромт, Соч. 90 No. 3	Impromptu, Op. 90 No. 3 (1827)	1971	original for piano
Franz Schubert	Скерцо	Scherzo	1936	
Franz Schubert	Два вальса	2 Waltzes, Op. 9 Nos. 1 and 2	1952	original from 36 Originaltänze, Op. 9, D. 365 for piano
François Schubert	Пчелка	Bagatelle "The Bee" (L'abeille; Die Biene), Op. 13 No. 9 (1860)	1937	original for violin and piano
Robert Schumann	Вечерняя песнь	Abendlied, Op. 85 No. 12 (1849)	1937	original for piano 4-hands
Robert Schumann	Адажио и аллегро	Adagio und Allegro, Op. 70 (1849)	1953	original for horn and piano
Robert Schumann	Маленький этюд	A Little Study for viola solo	1932	original for piano: No. 14 from Album für die Jugend, Op. 68 (1848)
Robert Schumann	Пастушеская мелодия	Pastoral (Alpenkuhreigen) for viola solo, Op. 115 No. 4	1932	from the incidental music for Manfred, Op. 115
Alexander Scriabin	Прелюдия	Prélude in C♯ minor, Op. 9 No. 1 (1894)	1935	transcription dated 1931
Dmitri Shostakovich	Адажио; Весенний Вальс	Adagio; Spring Waltz	1962	original from the ballet The Limpid Stream, Op. 39 (1934–1935), also in Ballet Suite No. 2
Dmitri Shostakovich	Пьесы из музыки к кинофильму "Овод" Увертюра Романс Контраданс Вальс-Шарманка Ноктюрн Галоп Сцена Интермеццо Народный праздник	Pieces from "The Gadfly" Overture Romance Contra-dance Barrel-Organ Waltz Nocturne Galop Scene Intermezzo Folk Festival (People's Holiday)	1964; 1964; 1964; 1966; 1966; 1966; 1976; 1976; 1976	from music to the film The Gadfly (Овод), Op. 97 (1955)
Lev Shvarts (1898–1962) (Лев Александрович Шварц)	Две Пьесы: 1. Мелодия; 2. Плясовая	2 Pieces: 1. Melodie; 2. Dance	1934	
Jean Sibelius	Грустный вальс, Соч. 44 No. 1	Valse triste, Op. 44 No. 1 (1903)	1963	original for orchestra
Johann Stamitz	Соната (соль-мажор)	Sonata in G major, Op. 6a	1956	original for violin and basso continuo: Sonate da camera
Carl Stamitz	Концерт	Concerto in D major for viola and orchestra, Op. 1 (published 1774)	1955	
Carl Stamitz	Концерт No. 2	Concerto No. 2 for viola and orchestra	1937	
Igor Stravinsky	Пастораль	Pastorale (1907)	1967	original for voice and piano
Pyotr Ilyich Tchaikovsky	Страстное Признание	Ardent Declaration (Aveu Passionné)	1950	original for piano
Pyotr Ilyich Tchaikovsky	Ночь, Соч. 73 No. 2	Night for voice, viola and piano, Op. 73 No. 2 (1893)	1977	original for voice and piano; words by Daniil Ratgauz
Pyotr Ilyich Tchaikovsky	Ноктюрн, Соч. 19 No. 4	Nocturne in D minor, Op. 19 No. 4 (1873)	1937	original for piano
Pyotr Ilyich Tchaikovsky	Нет, только тот, кто знал..., Соч. 6 No. 6	None But the Lonely Heart for voice, viola and piano, Op. 6 No. 6 (1869)	1977	original for voice and piano; words by Lev Mei
Pyotr Ilyich Tchaikovsky	Времена Года No. 1 У Камелька No. 4 Подснежник No. 5 Белые Ночи No. 10 Осенняя Песня	The Seasons (Les Saisons), Op. 37b No. 1 January: By the Fireside (Au Coin du Feu) No. 4 April: The Snowdrop (Perce-neige) No. 5 May: White Nights (Les Nuits de Mai) No. 10 October: Autumn Song (Chant d'Automne)	1950; 1949; 1949; 1949	original for piano
Pyotr Ilyich Tchaikovsky	Сентиментальный Вальс	Valse Sentimentale, Op. 51 No. 6 (1882)	1979	original for piano
Grigory Teplov	Менуэт	Minuet in C major	1946	transcription dated 1942
Thibaut IV	Песня о розе	The Rose's Song for voice, viola and piano	1977	original for voice and piano; words by Guillaume de Lorris
Nikolai Titov (1798–1843) (Николай Сергеевич Титов)	Романс	Romance in E♭ major	1946	transcription dated 1942
Joaquín Turina	Анданте из сюиты "Севилья"	Andante	1958	original from Sevilla, Op. 2 (1908) for piano
Alexander Veprik	Строгий напев	Chant rigoureux, Op. 9 (1927)	1937	original for clarinet and piano
Alexey Verstovsky	Вариации на две темы	Variations on Two Themes	1950	
Antonio Vivaldi	Концерт соль-мажор	Concerto in G major for viola and orchestra	1955	original: Concerto in D Major for viola d'amore and orchestra, RV 392
Carl Maria von Weber	Вариации	Variations on "A Schüsserl und a Rein'dl'" for viola and orchestra	1962	cadenzas by Borisovsky
Carl Friedrich Zelter	Концерт ми-бемоль мажор	Concerto in E♭ major for viola and orchestra	1959	
Aleksey Zhilin	Вальс	Waltz	1957	
Georgi Zlatev-Cherkin (1905–1977) (Георгий Златев-Черкин)	Севдана	Sevdana (1944)		original for violin and piano
