= Louis-Toussaint Milandre =

French composer, violinist and viol and viola d'amore player

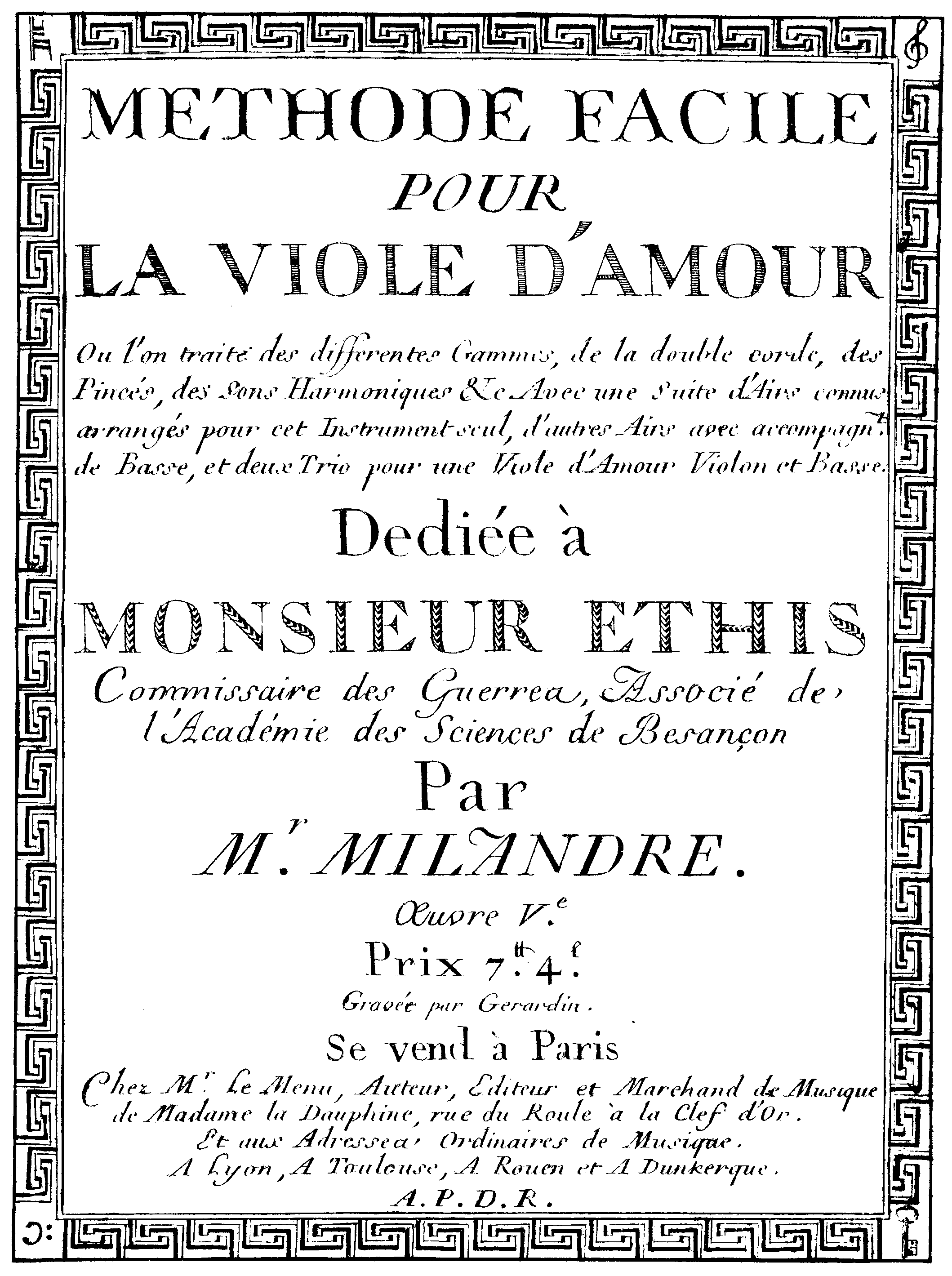
Title page of Méthode facile pour la Viole d'Amour (1771)

Louis-Toussaint Milandre (floruit ca. 1756 – ca. 1776) was a French composer, violinist, viol and viola d'amore player in the court chamber music of King Louis XV of France.

Milandre's Méthode facile pour la viole d'amour (Easy Method for the Viola d'amore), published in 1771 (previously thought to be published in 1782), contains thorough information on viola d'amore technique, along with a selection of arrangements and compositions. The method remains an important pedagogical volume.

In 1776, Milandre was editor of L'année musicale, a Parisian musical journal.

Several composers including Louis van Waefelghem, Vadim Borisovsky and Willy Burmester have made arrangements and transcriptions of Milandre's works.

== Works ==
Orchestral

- Symphonie à sept parties (1776)

Viola d'amore

- Méthode facile pour la viole d'amour, ou l'on traite des differentes gambes, de la double corde, des pincés, des sons harmoniques &c, avec une suite d'airs connus arrangés pour cet instrument seul, d'autres airs avec accompagnement de basse, et deux trio pour une viole d'amour, violon et basse, Op. 5 (1771); published by Le Menu, Paris

Pièces pour une viole d'amour avec basse
Pièces pour une viole d'amour, violon et basse
Trio en fa pour une viole d'amour, violon et basse

Vocal

- L'année musicale: ouvrage périodique melé des parodies des plus jolis petits airs italiens, Songs, mostly for solo voice, with and without accompaniment (figured bass) (published 1755–1756, Duchesne, Paris)
