= Varvara Adrianovna Gaigerova =

Russian composer and pianist

Varvara Adrianovna Gaigerova (Russian: Варвара Адриановна Гайгерова; 17 October [O.S. 4 October] 1903 in Orekhovo-Zuyevo, Russian Empire – 6 April 1944 in Moscow) was a Soviet composer and pianist.

== Life ==
Gaigerova studied composition under Georgy Catoire and Nikolai Myaskovsky and piano under Heinrich Neuhaus at Moscow Conservatory, where she graduated in 1927. At the Bolshoi Theatre she worked as "concertmistress" from 1936 to 1944.

Gaigerova was interested in the musical folklore of the southeastern people of Soviet Russia. In her compositions she uses folk music of various regions like Kalmykia, Buryatia, Kazakhstan, Turkestan, and Uzbekistan.

== Selected works ==
- Fortress near Kamenny Brod [Крепость у Каменного Брода], Op.30 (opera based on Lermontov and some Caucasian poets; 1937–40); Pechorin's Aria "И скучно, и грустно"; Тучки небесные
- Symphony No. 1 (1928)
- Symphony No. 2 on Kalmyk Themes (1934)
- Symphony No. 3 (1936)
- Symphonic Suite on Caucasian Themes
- Suite on Udmurt Themes [Сюита на темы удмуртских (вотских) народных песен], for domra orchestra (pub. 1933)
- Two Suites on Kazakh Themes (domra orch)
- String Quartet No. 1 (1925-26)
- String Quartet No. 2 in G Major on Yakuts Themes, Op. 17 (pub. 1947)
- Sonata for viola and piano, Op.4 (performed by Vadim Borisovsky and author in 1927)
- Suite in D minor for viola and piano, Op.8 (pub. 1969) (1. Allegro agitato; 2. Andantino; 3. Scherzo: Presto - also arr. for cello; 4. Moderato)
- 4 Sketches [Четыре эскиза] for piano (1926)
- Sonata for piano in E minor (performed in 1925)
- Sonatina on Buryat-Mongolian Themes, Op. 19 for piano (1934, pub. 1949)
- Poem for piano
- Fantasie for piano
- Romances after Pushkin, Op.26 (1937)
1. Сон "Что в имени тебе моем?"
2. Элегия "Безумных лет угасшее веселье"
3. Ночь
4. Не спрашивай
5. Заклинание "О, если правда"
- Romances after Pushkin, Op.28 (1937)
1. Желание "Медленно влекутся дни мои"
2. Ты и Вы
3. Пробуждение
4. Цветок
5. Воспоминание
6. Бессонница
- Romances after Pushkin, from Op.29

1. Я памятник себе воздвиг нерукотворный
2. Бессонница
9. Ненастный день потух

- The Diary of a Frontline Soldier [Дневник фронтовика], cantata for tenor, mixed chorus and orchestra. Lyrics by Iosif Utkin, Sergey Vasilyev, Aleksej Markov and Konstantin Simonov (1.Клятва 2.Весна 3.Твой подарок 4.В бою 5.Жди меня 6.Слава)
- To the woman of Turkmenistan [Женщине Туркменистана "Кочевница Туркменистана..."], lyrics by Tatiana Sikorskaya, for medium voice and piano (pub. 1935)
- Arrangements of Russian, Kalmyk, Bashkir, Byelorussian, Buryat, Kazakh, Kirghiz, Udmurt, Tatar and Uzbek songs
- Russian Folk Songs, Op. 10 (1. Прощай, жизнь-радость ты моя!; 3. Как под грушею)
- Russian Folk Song [Кольцо души-девицы], Op.33 No.1
- [Колониальная песня] (pub. 1932), [Персидский крестьянин] (pub. 1933) (Sergey Gorodetsky)
- Самое главное. Чувашская песня, lyrics by Agniya Barto (pub. 1934)
- 2 Folk Dances [2 народных танца (1. Якутский; 2. Бурят-Монгольский)], for domra orchestra (pub. 1951)
- Romances after Yakub Kolas
  - Book 1. В дороге, for high voice (В дороге; Моей любимой; Журавли; С кем-нибудь о тебе; Моей весне; На перепутье)
  - Book 2. Весна, вок. цикл (Ранней весной; На лугу; Заход солнца; Тройка; Весенняя ночь)
- Степной гигант. Песня о Магнитострое (Samuel Bolotin), pub. 1932
- Идиллия (Ivan Belousov)
- Прости (Dmitry Tsertelev)
- [В альбом], 7 Romances after Lermontov, Op.31 (1941-42)
1. В альбом
2. Звуки и взор
3. Дай руку мне
4. Нет, не тебя...
5. Листок
6. Силуэт
7. Пускай поэта обвиняет
- Other Romances
  - Желание
  - Прощание!
  - Парус (trio)
  - Друг
- Песнь Офелии; Нет имени тебе, мой дальний (Aleksandr Blok), performed in 1927
- Я одна (С. Терентьев), Элегия (Varvara Butiagina)
- Nocturne and Song without words, for violin and piano
