= Montagu Cleeve =

Stewart Montagu Cleeve (20 October 1894 – 5 January 1993) was a professional soldier who later in life was an enthusiastic music teacher who assisted in the revival of the viola d'amore.

Born in Southsea in Hampshire, he went to the Royal Military Academy, Woolwich and commissioned into the Royal Artillery. During the First World War, he became involved in super heavy artillery (see BL 14 inch Railway Gun) and was reputedly recalled to Dover in the Second World War on Churchill's instructions to help reassemble the same guns when they were deployed for coastal defence.

After 1946, when he had retired from the army, he dedicated himself to music; especially the violin which he taught enthusiastically to many generations of London schoolboys.

In later life, Cleeve helped with the revival of the viola d'amore and he formed, with others, the Viola d'Amore Society with the composer Frank Merrick as their first president (Ian White took over the Society in 1991).

In 1967, Cleeve attended a class run by Maurice Bouette and made his first reproduction. He made several improvements to increase the volume and assist tuning to meet the demands of modern music, increasing the strings to 18. Through the Viola d'Amore Society he gave concerts, commissioned works from contemporary composers and edited some 400 himself.
