= Virginia Nowell =

American publicist

- Virginia Nowell, from a 1940 newspaper
- Born: Virginia Genevieve Newsom; March 7, 1892; Wake County, North Carolina, U.S.
- Died: January 18, 1960 (age 67); Durham, North Carolina, U.S.
- Occupations: Event promoter, publicist, real estate developer
- Known for: Founder of the Green Guards of America (1939)

Virginia Genevieve Newsom Nowell (March 7, 1892 – January 18, 1960) was an American clubwoman, real estate developer, and publicist. After a series of legal and financial entanglements in North Carolina, she was founder and executive of the Green Guards of America, a short-lived national scheme to train women for emergency civil defense service before World War II.

== Early life ==
Virginia Newsom was born in Wake County, North Carolina, the daughter of Walter Raleigh Newsom and Margaret A. Starke Newsom.

== Career ==
Nowell was a restaurant owner, concert manager, and event promoter, based in Raleigh, North Carolina. In 1922 and 1923, she and her brothers bought at least sixty lots to develop in the residential Mordecai neighborhood of Raleigh. In 1926 she claimed to be "the largest builder of dwelling houses" in Raleigh, and was involved in complicated lawsuits involving bank foreclosures. In 1932 she tried to develop land for a "new Negro cemetery" in Raleigh, and she won workman's compensation for a back injury she sustained while working as a policewoman at the North Carolina State Fair. She was briefly jailed in 1933 when she failed to pay a large restaurant bill in Greenville. In 1937, she acted as literary agent for Thomas Dixon's anti-NAACP, pro-lynching novel The Flaming Sword, intended as sequel to The Clansman.

== The Green Guards of America ==
Nowell founded the Green Guards of America in 1939, with the stated goal of engaging American women for war preparedness with training, guns, uniforms, medals, and other military trappings. She called herself "the first woman general in the U.S.", and recruited directors for units in several states, including violinist Lily Nyeboe for New York. A contingent of Green Guards paraded at the 1939 World's Fair in New York City. Major magazines including Time and Mademoiselle covered the Green Guards and Nowell with some fascination. Soon, however, Nowell was questioned by authorities, and accused of mismanagement, exaggerating the membership numbers, and profiting from the effort. She started selling "Liberty by Mail", a 65-page training manual for aspiring Green Guards, in 1941.

== Personal life and legacy ==
Virginia Newsom married and divorced Henry H. Nowell. She raised two sons, James and Robert, who both fought in World War II; another son, Henry Jr., died in infancy. She lived in Raleigh after the war, and worked to establish an alcohol rehabilitation facility in Raleigh. She also returned to her habit of frequent lawsuits, and was suing "11 doctors, two insurance companies", a hospital, a newspaper and its editor, and two lawyers when she died from a heart attack in 1960, at the age of 67, in a courtroom in Durham, North Carolina. One of the properties she developed in Raleigh, the Mordecai Whitehall house, holds Raleigh Historic Landmark designation.
