= Sviatoslav Belonogov =

Russian viola d'amore player

Sviatoslav Belonogov (Russian: Святослав Белоногов; born 15 September 1965) is a Russian violist who is active in Tenerife, where he is mainly the Orquesta Sinfónica de Tenerife's viola soloist. He is also a viola d'amore player.

In 1988 he won the USSR National Viola Competition, and one year later was engaged by the State Symphony Orchestra of Moscow, where he was the viola soloist - a chair he left to sign for the Russian National Orchestra as it was founded. In 1992 he recorded Giya Kancheli's Liturgy for viola and orchestra along with the Moscow Symphony Orchestra. In 1994 he left the National Orchestra for Vladimir Spivakov's Moscow Virtuosi chamber orchestra, where he was a soloist before he settled in Spain.
