= Lily Nyeboe =

American violinist (1905–1987)

- Born: October 25, 1905; Brooklyn, New York, U.S.
- Died: October 16, 1987 (aged 81)
- Other names: Lillian Nyeboe, Lily Nyboe, Lillie Nyeboe
- Occupations: Violinist, violin teacher, conductor

Lily Nyeboe (October 25, 1905 – October 16, 1987), also written as Lily Nyboe, was an American violinist and violin teacher. She was conductor of the Northern Westchester Symphony Orchestra in the 1930s, and of the Brooklyn String Orchestra in the 1940s and 1950s.

== Early life and education ==
Nyeboe was born in Brooklyn, the daughter of Ancher Nyeboe and Anna E. Hardenberg Nyeboe. Her parents were both Danish immigrants; her father was a druggist. She studied violin with Kathryn Platt Gunn and Eddy Brown, conducting with Léon Barzin and Philip James, and music theory with Jean Buchta of the Harmony Guild of New York.

== Career ==
Nyeboe was a professional violinist and violin teacher. She was head of the violin department at the Brooklyn Academy of Musical Art. In 1932 she served on a committee to promote chamber music in Westchester County. She organized and conducted the Northern Westchester Symphony Orchestra in the 1930s. "Miss Nyeboe is an interesting conductor to watch because of her gracefulness and poise," commented a local newspaper in 1935. She was a member of the Pleasantville String Quartet, and a guest artist of the Westchester Opera Association.

In 1940, Nyeboe was Westchester County organizer for Virginia Nowell's Green Guards of America, and became commander of the New York State unit. "Green Guards are women troops and are not to be confused with other women's clubs or welfare activities," she explained. "The members take courses in preparedness to be of use in time of national emergency, whether in war or peace." By January 1941, citing concerns about the organization's national leadership, she resigned her post and dissolved the White Plains unit of the Green Guards.

Nyeboe conducted the Brooklyn String Orchestra from 1941 into the 1950s. The Brooklyn String Orchestra members were mostly serious amateur musicians, and their annual concerts were free to the public. Nyeboe also played at churches and community events. She took an active interest in public transit planning, because her musical career often required late commutes home from New York City. She taught at Katonah High School in 1949. When she was terminated from public school teaching, she sued the state superintendent, claiming that she was entitled to tenure. Her case, Nyboe v. Allen, reached the New York Supreme Court, but it was not decided in her favor.
