= José Herrando =

Spanish violinist and composer (1720/21–1763)

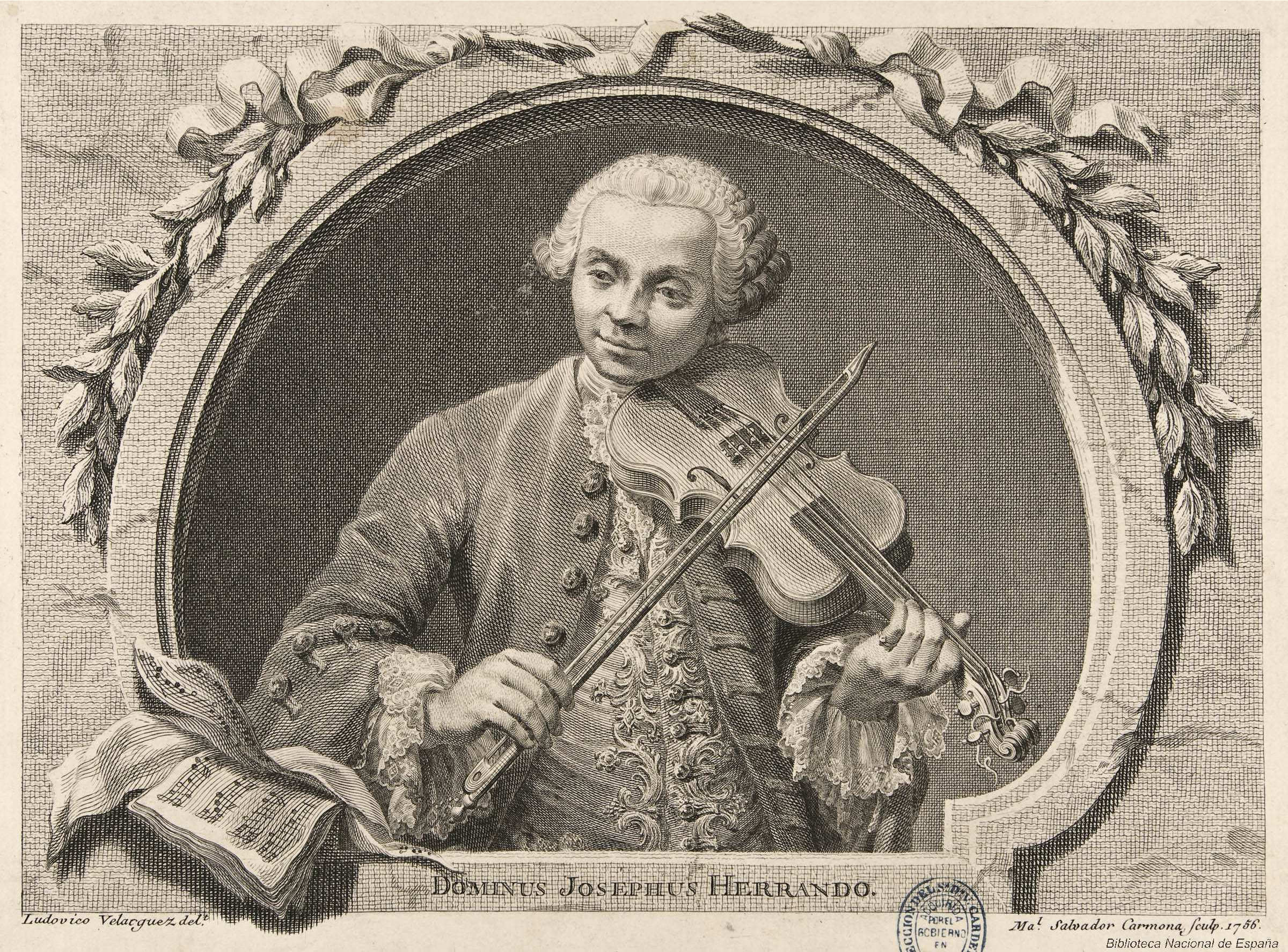
- Engraving of Herrando by Manuel Salvador Carmona, 1756
- Born: Dominus Josephus Herrando c. 1720/21; Valencia, Spain
- Died: 1763 (aged 41–43); Madrid, Spain
- Occupations: Violinist; composer
- Years active: 1750s–1760s
- Style: Classical

José Herrando (c. 1720/21, Valencia – 1763, Madrid) was a Spanish violinist and composer.

== Career ==
Herrando was a friend of the writer and mathematician Diego de Torres Villarroel and was a fixed musician for some theatre companies in Madrid, for which he composed several pieces, such as for the comedy Manos blancas no ofenden ('White hands do not offend') by Pedro Calderón de la Barca. He spent some time in the service of the Duke of Arcos theatre, to which he dedicated his Arte y puntual explicación del modo de tocar el violín con perfección y facilidad ('Art and timely explanation of how to play the violin with perfection and ease') published in Paris in 1756; this was the first published attempt by a Spaniard at teaching the violin. Its front featured a portrait engraving of him by Manuel Salvador Carmona.

Herrando was first violinist for the Royal Chapel of the Incarnation when, in 1754, he wrote Seis sonatinas para violín de cinco cuerdas y bajo armónico, no cifrado ('Six sonatinas for five-string violin and bass') dedicated to the castrati singer Farinelli (Carlo Broschi) a musician who was with the Spanish court during the reign of Philip V, whose soprano voice was the only one capable of taking the monarch out of his deep depression. His style follows the Italian fashion but has vigor and freshness of melodic invention and the quality of an Albero or a Soler.

In 1760, he published, in London, the collection Diecisiete nuevos minuetos españoles para dos violines ('Seventeen new Spanish minuets for two violins'), which contains some of his works. Like his contemporary, composer Luis Misón, Herrando played with his violin in the evenings in Madrid's Palace of the Dukes of Alba. From him, in the Liria Palace, Jose Subirá cataloged twelve sonatas for violin and bass; twelve violin gigs; twelve trios for two violins and bass, dedicated to the Duke of Huéscar in 1751; and some duets for two violins as well as a Libro de Diferentes Lecciones para la Viola ('Book of Different Lessons for Viola') containing 42 years of interesting work. Most of these works were lost during the Spanish Civil War, but some of the sonatas have survived due to the first volume of Clásicos españoles del violín ('Spanish Violin Classics'), published in Paris in 1937, released by Joaquín Nin.

== Works ==
=== Written ===
- Paris, 1756: Arte y puntual explicación del modo de tocar el violín con perfección y facilidad ('Art and timely explanation of how to play the violin with perfection and ease')
- Libro de Diferentes Lecciones para la Viola ('Book of Different Lessons for Viola')

=== Music works ===
- Seis sonatinas para violín de cinco cuerdas y bajo armónico, no cifrado (('Six sonatinas for five-string violin and bass')
- Doce sonatas para violín y bajo ('Twelve sonatas for violin and bass')
- Doce tocatas para violín ('Twelve violin gigs')
- Doce tríos para dos violines y bajo ('Twelve trios for two violins and bass')
- Dúos para dos violines ('Duets for two violins')
