= Viola d'amore =

Musical instrument

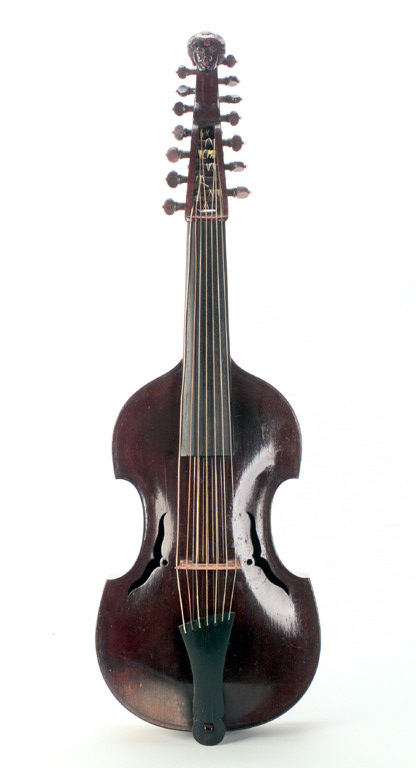
- Viola d'amore

String instrument
- Other names: viole d'amour Liebesgeige amorka altówka miłosna lemmenviulu
- Classification: Bowed string instrument
- Hornbostel–Sachs classification: 321.322-71 (Composite chordophone sounded by a bow)

Playing range
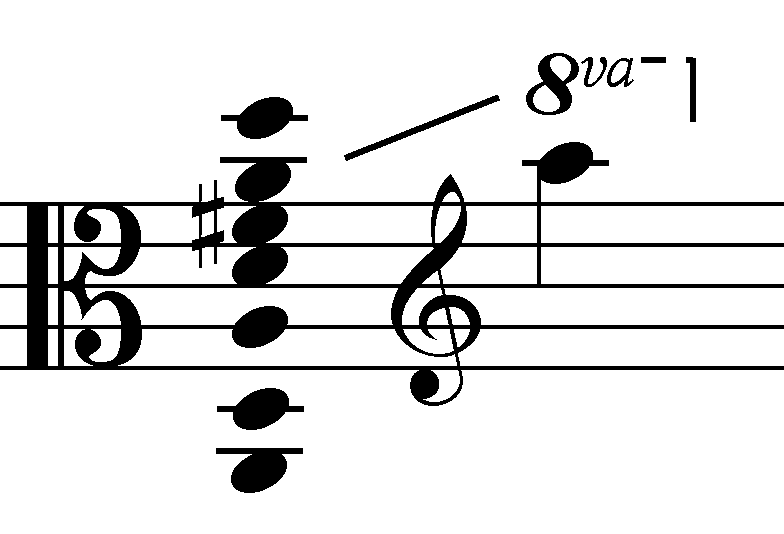

Related instruments
- Violoncello; Viol (viola da gamba); Baryton; Hardanger fiddle; Viola; Violin; Double bass

The viola d'amore (pronounced [ˈvjɔːla daˈmoːre, viˈɔːla -]; Italian for 'viol of love') is a 6- or 7-stringed musical instrument with additional sympathetic strings, which is often associated with music of the Baroque period. It is played under the chin in the same manner as the violin. A player of the instrument may be called a violist d'amore, or simply referred to as a viola d'amore player.

== Structure and sound ==
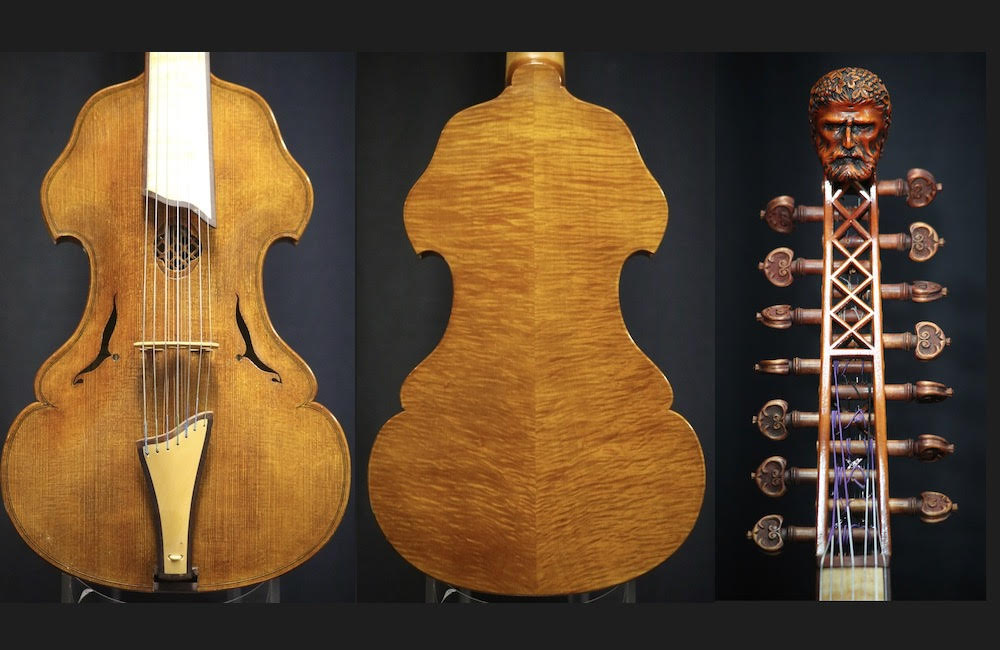
1997 Viola d’amore, crafted by Eric, Nancy and Hans Benning, Benning Violins.

The viola d'amore shares many features of the viol family. It looks like a thinner treble viol without frets and usually with sympathetic strings added. The six-string viola d'amore and the treble viol also have approximately the same range of playable notes, though the viola d'amore's repertoire generally makes greater use of the higher register. Like all instruments in the viol family, it has a flat back. An intricately carved head at the top of the peg box is common on both viols and viola d'amore, although some instruments lack one. Unlike the carved heads on viols, the viola d'amore's head appears most often in the shape of Cupid blindfolded, representing the blindness of love. This was one of the three usual sound hole shapes for viols as well. It is unfretted, and played much like a violin, being held horizontally under the chin. It is about the same size as the modern viola, though its construction has never been entirely standardized and instruments tend to vary slightly in size.

The viola d'amore usually has six or seven playing strings, which are sounded by drawing a bow across them, just as with a violin or viol. In addition, it has an equal number of sympathetic strings located below the main strings and the fingerboard which are not played directly but vibrate in sympathy with the notes played. A common variation is six playing strings, and instruments exist with as many as fourteen sympathetic strings alone, though these are quite rare. Despite the fact that the sympathetic strings are now thought of as the most characteristic element of the instrument, early forms of the instrument almost uniformly lacked them. The first unambiguous reference to a viola d'amore with sympathetic strings does not occur until the 1730s. Both types continued to be built and played through the 18th century.

Largely thanks to the sympathetic strings, the viola d'amore has a particularly sweet and warm sound. Leopold Mozart, writing in his Versuch einer gründlichen Violinschule, said that the instrument sounded "especially charming in the stillness of the evening." The sound of the instrument is in many cases noticeably quieter than the violin or viola, due to the back of the instrument being flat. However, many composers who have written for the instrument have known this and have adapted their orchestration to accommodate the instrument's timbre. Vivaldi, for example, often scored the bass line in the violin parts for his viola d'amore concerti so as to avoid issues of balance.

The first known mention of the name viol d'amore appeared in John Evelyn's Diary (20 November 1679): "for its swetenesse & novelty the Viol d'Amore of 5 wyre-strings, plaid on with a bow, being but an ordinary violin, play'd on Lyra way by a German, than which I never heard a sweeter Instrument or more surprizing..."

== Range ==
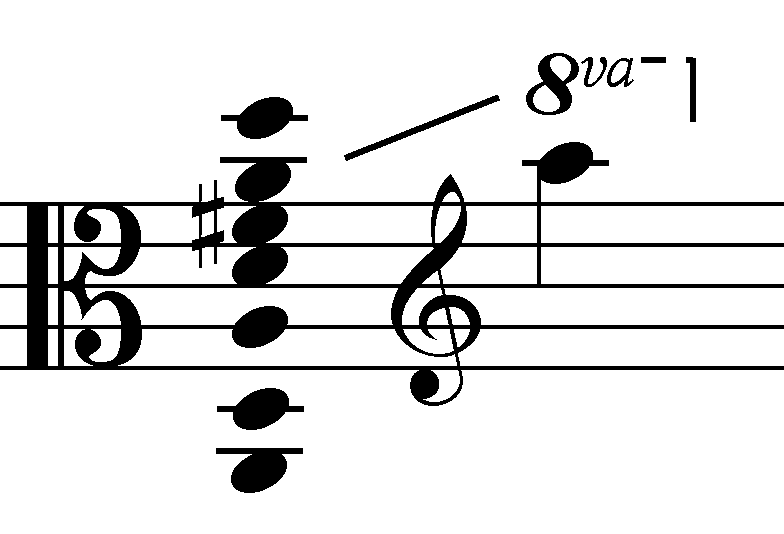

As on the treble viol, the register above the octave (d) on the top string is seldom used in music of the 17th and 18th centuries. The viola d'amore was normally tuned specifically for the piece it was to play - cf. scordatura. Most commonly, the instrument would be tuned in D major, and by the end of the 18th century this became the standard: A, d, a, d', f♯', a', d". However, other tunings used include a D minor tuning (achieved by simply lowering the third string to F-natural) and an A minor tuning, both used in the viola d'amore concerti written by Antonio Vivaldi.

The overall range of the modern version of the instrument generally stretches from A2 to A6, though many instruments with longer fingerboards are capable of playing higher than this. Due to the enormous range covered by the open tuning itself, a three-octave A major scale can be played on a seven-string instrument without shifting past first position.

== Use ==
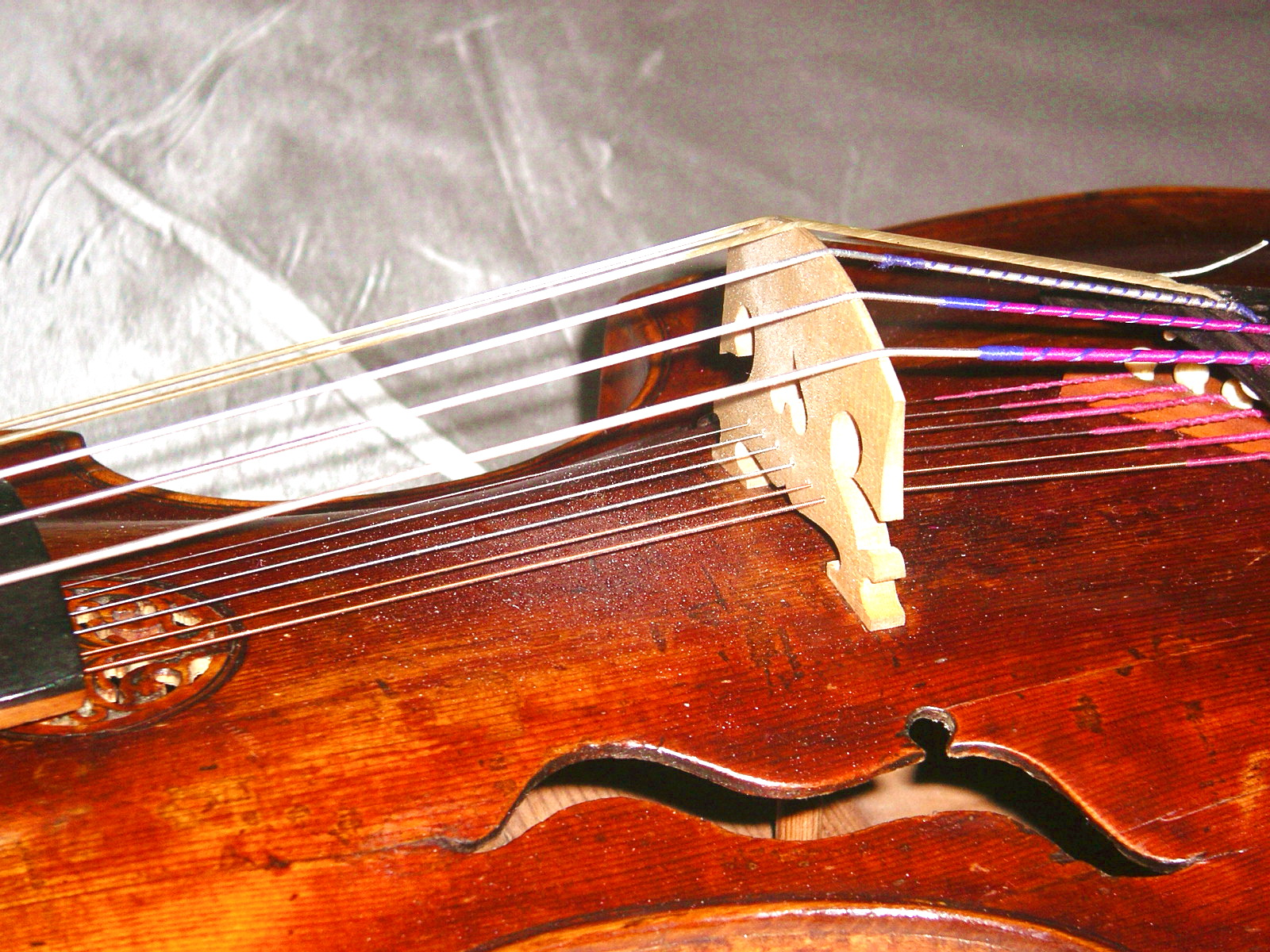
The bridge on an early 18th-century instrument, showing both sets of strings.

The instrument was especially popular in the late 17th century, although a specialized viola d'amore player would have been highly unusual, since it was customary for professional musicians to play a number of instruments, especially within the family of the musician's main instrument. Towards the end of the 18th century, the instrument largely fell from use, as the volume and power of the violin family became preferred over the more introverted tone of the viol family. However, there has been significant renewed interest in the viola d'amore in the last century. The viola players and composers Henri Casadesus and Paul Hindemith both played the viola d'amore in the early 20th century, and the film composer Bernard Herrmann made use of it in several scores. It may be noted that, like instruments of the violin family, the modern viola d'amore was altered slightly in its construction from the Baroque version, mainly to support the extra tension of steel wound strings.

Leoš Janáček originally planned to use the viola d'amore in place of the viola in his second string quartet, "Intimate Letters". The use of the instrument was symbolic of the nature of his relationship with Kamila Stösslová, a relationship that inspired the work. However, the version with viola d'amore was found in rehearsal to be impracticable, and Janáček re-cast the part for the four-string viola. Sergei Prokofiev's ballet Romeo and Juliet features a viola d'amore as well.

The viola d'amore can be heard today on occasion in musical ensembles that specialise in historically informed performances of Baroque music on authentic instruments, and is heard most often in this style of music as a solo instrument rather than an integrated member of the ensemble. Many viola d'amore players in the modern day have also introduced the instrument to genres such as jazz, contemporary, folk, and electronic music.

== Scordatura notation ==
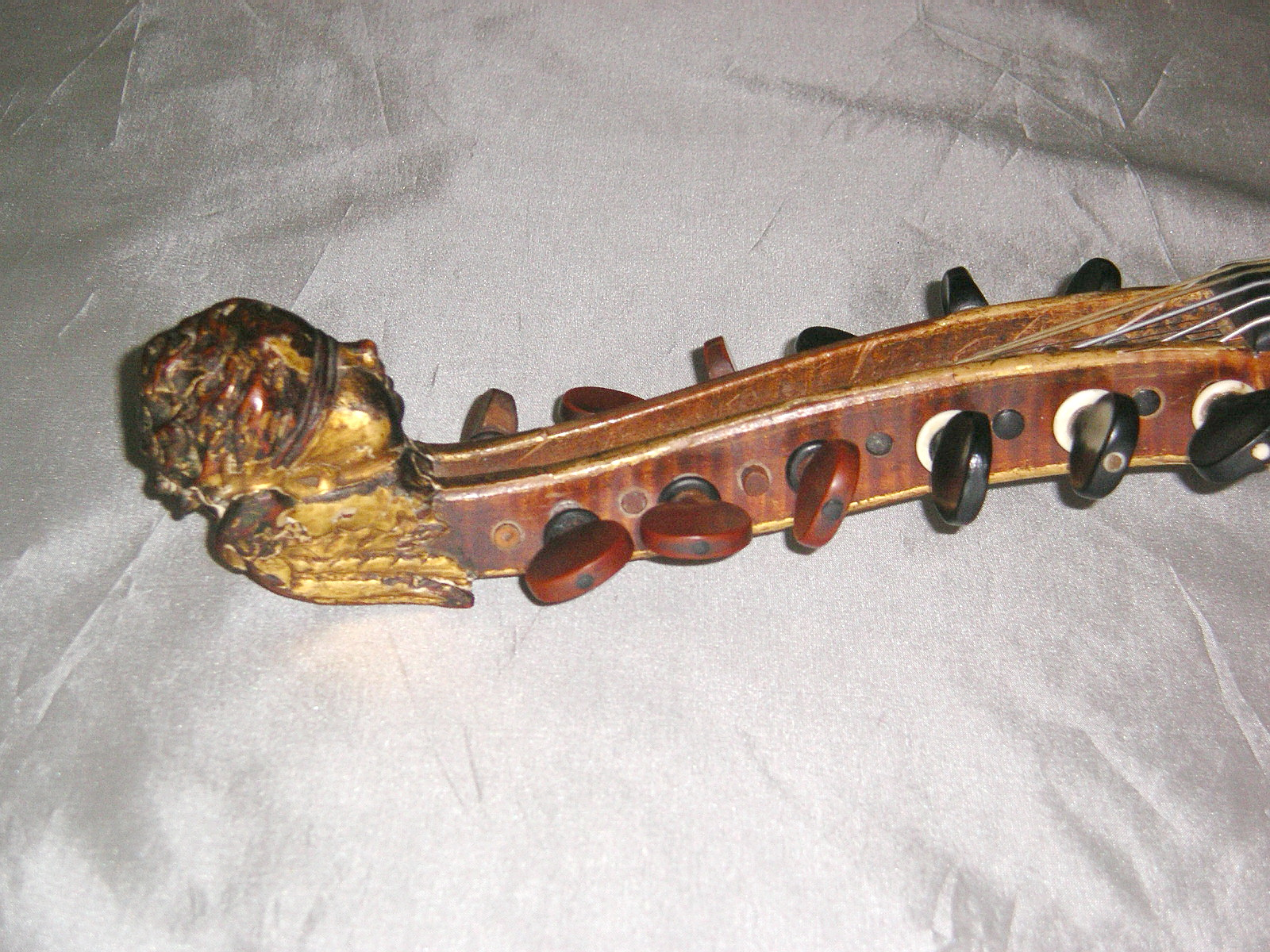
The head of an early 18th-century instrument, featuring blindfolded Love.

Scordatura notation was first used in the late seventeenth century as a way for violinists to quickly read music for violin with altered tunings. Because the intervals are not uniform across the viola d'amore's range (i.e. the strings are not all tuned in one interval), many violinists began notating viola d'amore music as though the top four strings were tuned in fifths. Heinrich Ignaz Franz Biber, Antonio Vivaldi and Johann Joseph Vilsmayr (a student of Biber), among others, wrote pieces for violin with one or more strings retuned to notes other than the usual fifths. Given that the viola d’amore was usually played by violinists and that many different tunings were used, scordatura notation often made it easier for a violinist to read the music, though it is generally considered archaic by many players today.

Scordatura notation exists in a number of different types. Treble clef, alto clef, and soprano clefs are all used by different composers. Bass clef has often been used for notes on the lower two or three strings (on instruments with more than five strings), and usually sounds an octave higher than written. In scordatura, one imagines that one is playing a violin (or in some cases a viola, where alto clef is used) tuned in the normal fifths. Scordatura notation informs the player not about what note will sound but rather about where they should place their fingers; therefore, it may be referred to as a tablature or "finger" notation. In a more modern convention, alto clef is often used for the lower register (with treble clef having been standardized for the higher register), for ease of notation and transposition. This system was not overall unheard of in the Baroque era, but it became much more popular in music for the instrument from the late 19th century on (such as in works by Loeffler, Hindemith, and Casadesus), and is still used today, alongside the bass clef system.

In Biber's Harmonia Artificiosa no. VII, a very unique version of scordatura notation is used. Biber uses a nine-line staff. The clefs used are based on alto clef (imagining that one is playing a viola). The piece is written for a six-stringed instrument. The upper part of the staff supposes that one is playing on the upper four strings and the lower part that one is playing on the lower four strings (still imagining that you are reading the four strings of a viola in alto clef). This does mean that there are two ways of notating notes on the middle two strings, but it quickly becomes apparent, when playing, what the correct reading should be.

== Repertoire ==
Baroque and Classical works

- Heinrich Biber (1644–1704)

Partita VII for two viole d'amore and basso continuo, from Harmonia artificiosa - ariosa, 1696.

- Christian Pezold (1677-1733)

2 Partitas for solo viola d'amore

- Attilio Ariosti (1666–1729)

6 Lessons for viola d'amore and continuo
15 Sonatas
used in 2 cantatas
used as an obbligato instrument in the opera, "Marte Placato" (1707)

- Antonio Vivaldi (1678–1741)

Concerto in D major, RV 392, P.166
Concerto in D minor, RV 393, P.289
Concerto in D minor, RV 394, P.288
Concerto in D minor, RV 395, P.287
Concerto in A major, RV 396, P.233
Concerto in A minor, RV 397, P.37
Concerto in D minor for viola d'amore and lute, RV 540
Concerto da Camera in F major for viola d'amore, 2 oboes, 2 horns, bassoon, continuo, RV 97

Vivaldi also used the viola d'amore as an obbligato instrument in sacred works and operas:

Nisi Dominus, RV 608 Gloria Patri
Juditha Triumphans, 644 Quanto magis generosa
Tito Manlio, RV 738 Tu dormi in tante pene
Nisi Dominus, RV 803 Nisi Dominus

- Christoph Graupner (1683–1760)

Trio Sonata in C major for flute, viola d'amore and continuo, GWV 202
Trio Sonata in D major for flute, viola d'amore and continuo, GWV 205
Trio Sonata in D minor for flute, viola d'amore and continuo, GWV 207
Trio Sonata in E minor for flute, viola d'amore and continuo, GWV 209
Trio Sonata in F major for viola d'amore, bass chalumeau and continuo, GWV 210
Trio Sonata in B♭ major for flute, viola d'amore and continuo, GWV 217
Concerto in D major for viola d'amore, strings and continuo, GWV 314
Concerto in F major for flute, viola d'amore, chalumeau, strings and continuo, GWV 327
Concerto in D major for flauto d'amore, oboe d'amore, viola d'amore, strings and continuo, GWV 333
Concerto in G minor for viola d'amore, strings and continuo, GWV 336
Concerto in A major for viola, viola d'amore, strings and continuo, GWV 339
Concerto in B♭ major for chalumeau, viola d'amore, oboe, strings and continuo, GWV 343
Ouverture in D major for oboe d'amore, viola d'amore, strings and continuo, GWV 419
Ouverture in D minor for bassoon, viola d'amore, strings and continuo, GWV 426
Ouverture in D major for viola d'amore, strings and continuo, GWV 427
Ouverture in E major for viola d'amore, strings and continuo, GWV 438
Ouverture in F major for flute, viola d'amore, chalumeau, strings and continuo, GWV 450
Ouverture in F major for flute, viola d'amore, 2 chalumeaux, strings and continuo, GWV 451
Ouverture in G major for viola d'amore, strings and continuo, GWV 459
Ouverture in G major for viola d'amore, strings and continuo, GWV 460
Ouverture in G major for viola d'amore, bassoon, strings and continuo, GWV 465
Ouverture in A major for viola d'amore, strings and continuo, GWV 476
Ouverture in A major for flute, viola d'amore, oboe, bassoon, strings and continuo, GWV 477
Sinfonia in F major for soli viola d'amore, cello and bassoon, 3 violas and basso continuo, GWV 577

Graupner also used the viola d'amore as an obbligato instrument in 18 of his cantatas:

Ach Sterbliche bedenkt das Ende, GWV 1157/25
Erschrocknes Zion sei erfreut, GWV 1128/24
Erwacht ihr Heiden, GWV 1111/34
Gott ist's der in euch wirket, GWV 1163/23
Halleluja Dank und Ehre, GWV 1109/40
Herr unser Gott, GWV 1174/17
Ich habe Lust abzuscheiden, GWV 1175/26c
Ihr schlummert, ihr schlafet
Jesu frommer Menschenherden, GWV 1140/25
Kommet herzu lasset uns dem Herrn frohlocken, GWV 1174/38
Lobet ihr Knechte des Herrn, GWV 1174/18
Preise Jerusalem den Herrn, GWV 1174/20
Schicket euch in die Zeit, GWV 1151/14
So demütiget euch nun, GWV 1125/23
Wer die Wahrheit tut, GWV 1139/38
Wir warten eines neuen Himmels, GWV 1167/23
Wir wissen dass unser irdisches Haus, GWV 1175/39b
Wisset ihr nicht dass auf diesen Tag, GWV 1127/26

- Georg Philipp Telemann (1681–1767)

Concerto in E major for flute, oboe d'amore, viola d'amore, strings and continuo
Trio Sonata in D major for flute, viola d'amore and continuo
No.26 & 36 in Brockes Passion, TWV 5:1
Cantata Herr lehre uns bedenken dass wir sterben müssen, TWV 1:763

- Johann Sebastian Bach (1685–1750)

used in aria no.19 and 20 of the Johannes Passion and in Cantatas Nos. 36c, 152, and 205
Tritt auf die Glaubensbahn, BWV 152

- Johann Joachim Quantz (1697–1773)

Trio Sonata in C minor for flute, viola d'amore and continuo, QV 2:Anh.4
Trio Sonata in F major for flute, viola d'amore and continuo, QV 2:Anh.29

- Louis-Toussaint Milandre (18th century)

Pièces pour une viole d'amour avec basse
Pièces pour une viole d'amour, violon et basse
Trio en fa pour une viole d'amour, violon et basse

- Carlo Martinides (c.1731–1794)

Divertimento in E♭ major for viola d'amore, violin, viola and cello

- Joseph Haydn (1732–1809)

Divertimento for viola d'amore, violin and cello; This is an 18th-century arrangement of a work by Haydn.

- Carl Stamitz (1745–1801)

3 Viola d'Amore Concertos
Sonata in D major for viola d'amore and basso continuo
various other sonatas
Quartet for oboe, violin, viola d'amore and cello

- Franz Anton Hoffmeister (1754–1812)

Quartet in E♭ major (D major) for viola d'amore, 2 violins and cello

- Joseph Leopold Eybler (1765–1846)

Quintet No.1 in D major for viola d'amore, violin, viola, cello and violone
Quintet No.2 in D major for viola d'amore, violin, viola, cello and violone
Offertorium, "In Festo Sta. Theresia" for tenor, soli viola d'amore and cello, strings and chorus

Romantic, 20th-century, and contemporary works

- Louis van Waefelghem (1840–1908)

Romance in D major for violin or viola d'amore and piano (1891)
Soir d'automne (Autumn Evening), Melody for viola d'amore or viola and piano or harp (1903)

- Charles Martin Loeffler (1861–1935)

La mort de Tintagiles, symphonic poem for viola d'amore (originally two) and orchestra, Op. 6 (1897–1900)
'The Lone Prairie" for tenor saxophone, viola d'amore and piano
'L'archet' for viola d'amore, piano, soprano solo and women's chorus, Op. 26 (ca. 1900)

- Ottorino Respighi (1879-1936)

Quartet for quinton, viola d'amore, viola da gamba, and basse de viole

- Henri Casadesus (1879–1947)

Concerto for viola d'amore and strings
24 Préludes for viola d'amore with optional accompaniment from harpsichord, piano, or harp (1931)

- Heitor Villa-Lobos (1887–1959)

Amazonas (1917)

- Frank Martin (1890–1974)

Sonata da chiesa for viola d'amore and organ or string orchestra (1952)

- Paul Hindemith (1895–1963)

Kleine Sonate (Small Sonata) in D major for viola d'amore and piano, Op. 25 No. 2 (1922)
Kammermusik No. 6 for solo viola d'amore and chamber orchestra, Op. 46 No. 1 (1927)

- Bruno Maderna (1920–1973)

Viola per viola sola (o viola d'amore) (1971)

- Poul Rovsing Olsen (1922-1982)

Pour une viole d'amour, Op. 66 (1969)

- Johannes Fritsch (1941-2010)

Violectra for viola d'amore and synthesizer (1971)

- Salvatore Sciarrino (*1947)

Romanza per viola d'amore e orchestra (1973)

- Paul Rosenbloom (*1952)

Concerto for two violas d'amore and chamber orchestra (1994)

- Georg Friedrich Haas (*1953)

Solo for viola d'amore (2000)

- Michael Edwards (*1968)

24/7:: freedom fried for viola d'amore and live electronics (2006)

- Gustavo Diaz-Jerez (*1970)

Ricercare: D. Schostakovitch in Memoriam for viola d'amore and string orchestra or piano
Havan, concertino for viola d'amore and chamber orchestra
Partita for viola d'amore, piano, vibraphone, marimba, and percussion

- Dario Palermo (*1970)

Ritual for viola d'amore, real time composition and live electronics (2007)

- Emily Doolittle (*1972)

Virelais for viola d'amore and voice (2001)

- Rachel Stott (*1968)

Odysseus in Ogygia for six violas d'amore (2011)
Tartini and his Pupil for two violas d'amore (2016)
Ariel's Songs for soprano and two violas d'amore (2000)
Wenn Wege sich Kreuzen for soprano and viola d'amore (2013)
Maturity for soprano and viola d'amore (2014)

- Hans Vermeersch (*1957)

Bhalobasha for viola d’amore and tape (première Hulst, Netherlands)(2011)
Gadbad for 2 viole d’amore, cello and harpsichord (première, Innsbruck, Austria) (2012)
Sootch for viola d’amore solo and tape (première Kaposvar, Hongary) (2014)
Tombeau for 2 viole d’amore, cello and harpsichord (première Kaposvar, Hungary) (2014)
Three Indian seasons for countertenor, 2 viola d’amore, cello, desk bells & harpsichord. (Première European Music Centre Penderecki in Luslawice, Polen) (2016)
Wepwawet for solo viola d’amore, desk bells and tape. (Première European Music Centre Penderecki in Luslawice, Poland)(2016)
Yesterday's Twilight for 2 viole d’amore and oboe (originaly for Dilruba) (première Neuwied-Engers, Germany)(2017)
Micro concerto for oboe, viola d’amore & strings (première juni 2018 in Sondershausen, Germany)(2018)
Rorate Caeli for viola d’amore and tape (première in Sondershausen, Germany) (2018)
Fragments of Fragment suite for 2 viole d’amore (première juni 2018 in Sondershausen, Germany)(2018)
Uberfluß an Genuß führt am Schluß zu Verdruss musical joke for soprano, 3 viole d‘amore and cello (Aachen, Germany)(2019)
Der Dezember for soprano and viola d’amore. (première in Aachen, Germany)(2019)
Maria Magdala for viola d’amore and piano (première in Palermo, Sicily)(2021)
Fast 1’ spaß for 2 viole d’amore and an eggtimer (première september 2021 in Tübingen, Germany
Los Sabores De Espagna for 2 viole d’amore in D (première juni 2022 in Rheinsberg, Germany)
Carnatic Biber for viola d’amore and tape (première juni 2022 in Rheinsberg, Germany)
The Viola d’Amore Jig for 3 viole d’amore (première oktober 2023 Wolfenbüttel, Germany)
Akh Hayastan for viola d'amore solo, viola d'amore echo and chamber orchestra (oktober 2023 Wolfenbüttel, Germany)
Die Sieben Tage Der Woche suite for 2 viole d’amore (première juni 2026 in Rheinsberg, Germany)
The Summer for viola d'amore solo (première augustus 2024 Bad Fredeburg, Germany)
The Autumn for viola d'amore solo (première juni 2026 Bad in Rheinsberg, Germany)
Die sieben letzten Worte unseres Erlösers am Kreuze 8 part suite for 2 viole d'amore (première Easter Week 2027)

The viola d'amore is also used in

- Le Paradis de Mahomet (1822) by Rodolphe Kreutzer
- Les Huguenots (1836) by Giacomo Meyerbeer
- Bánk bán (1861) by Ferenc Erkel
- Le jongleur de Notre-Dame (1901) and "Cendrillon" (1899) by Jules Massenet
- Madama Butterfly (1904) by Giacomo Puccini
- Palestrina (1912) by Hans Pfitzner
- Káťa Kabanová (1919) by Leoš Janáček; The viola d'amore represents the title character.
- Romeo and Juliet (1935–1936) by Sergei Prokofiev
- ...?risonanze!... (1996–1997) by Olga Neuwirth
- The Misprision of Transparency (2001) by Aaron Cassidy

Film and Television

- Bernard Herrmann's score for On Dangerous Ground (1951) makes extensive use of the viola d'amore, particularly for the female protagonist's theme. The performer of the instrument Virginia Majewski receives a credit in the film's opening titles.
- Bernard Herrmann's score for Little Girl Lost, a Twilight Zone (1962) television episode, makes use of the viola d'amore alongside four harps, a quartet of flutes (including alto and bass flutes), and percussion. Virginia Majewski performs most evocatively.
- James Newton Howard's score for After Earth (2013) uses a quartet of violas d'amore to provide eerie soundscapes, performed by Pamela Goldsmith, Roland Kato, Jennie Hansen and Adriana Zoppo.

Note: The papers of Walter Voigtlander contain 142 arrangements and transcriptions of works for the instrument.

== Pedagogical works ==
- The Modern Viole d'Amour Player, Systematically Arranged Material for the Studie of the Viole d'Amour for the Violin Player by Walter Voigtlander (written before 1914). This is a basic pedagogical method, which starts the player from the most elementary elements of the instrument and progresses to a fair level of difficulty. It contains adaptations of violin and viola exercises by many well-known pedagogues. In addition, the work contains a supplement with many solo works and orchestral soli, by many composers, including his own 42 Studies (see below). Available as part of The Walter Voigtlander Collection of Viola d'Amore Music, ca. 1890–1930 at the New York Public Library for the Performing Arts (see finding aid).
- 42 Studies transcribed for the Viole d'Amour for the Violin Player, and Viola Studies for Self-Study by Walter Voigtlander. It has annotations in both German and English. It is the more advanced of his two pedagogical works, being intended, according to Rosenblum, largely for his own use. Exercises from well-known violin and viola method books are extracted and modified for the viola d'amore. Available as part of The Walter Voigtlander Collection of Viola d'Amore Music, ca. 1890–1930 at the New York Public Library for the Performing Arts (see finding aid).
- 16 Studi-Capricci for Viola d'amore by Aurelio Arcidiacono (1915-2000) These are advanced etudes, music eminently suitable for performance. Published by Amore Publications (1990)

== Viola d'amore players ==
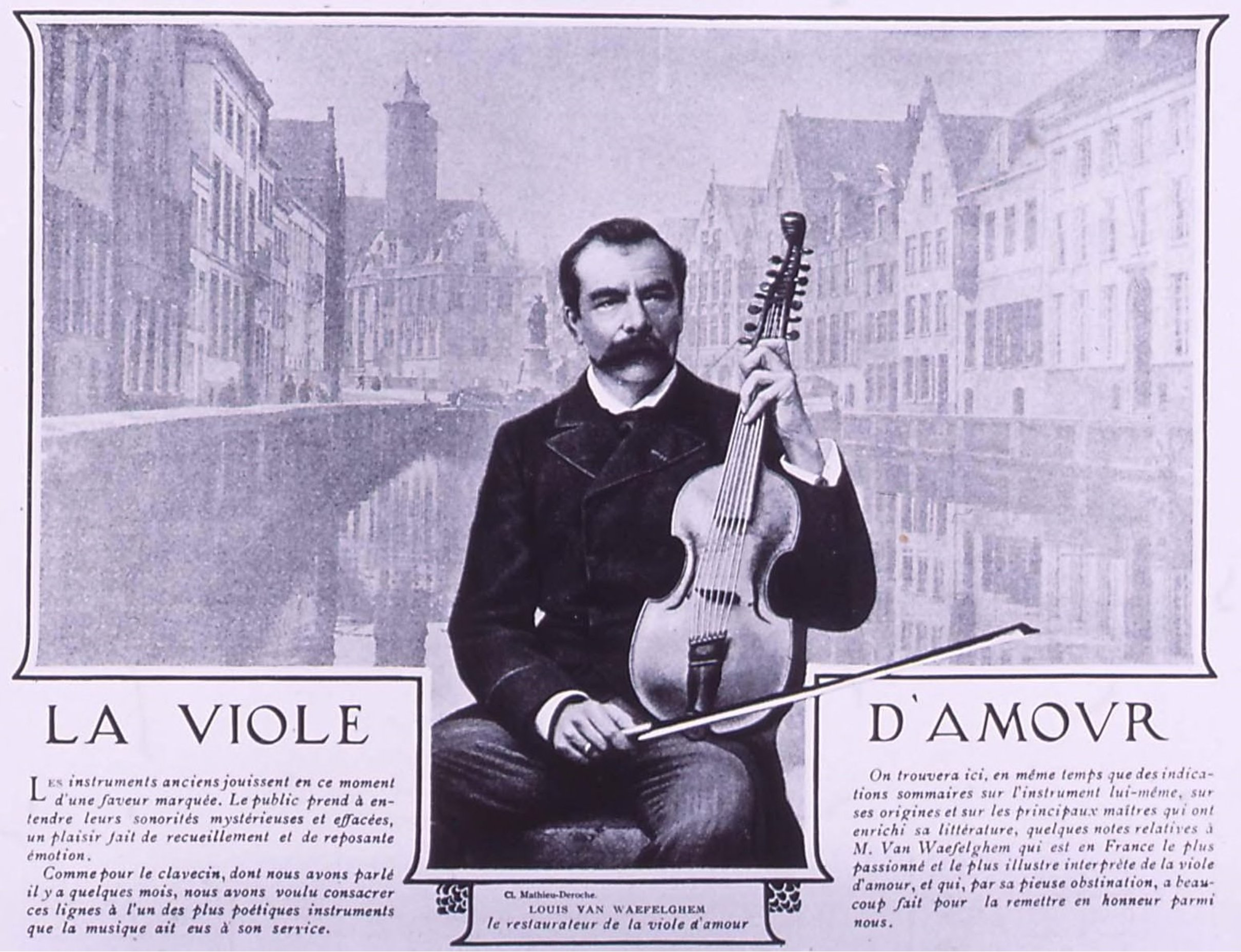
Louis van Waefelghem with viola d'amore

- Attilio Ariosti (1666–1729)
- Louis-Toussaint Milandre (unknown-1776)
- Antonio Vivaldi (1678-1741)
- Farinelli (1705–1782)
- Alexandro Marie Antoin Fridzeri (1741-1819)
- Chrétien Urhan (1790–1845)
- Johann Král (1823–1912)
- Louis van Waefelghem (1840–1908)
- George Saint-George (1841–1924)
- Hugo Walter Voigtlander (1859-1933)
- Kate Chaplin (1865–1948)
- Carl Valentin Wunderle (1866-1944)
- Henri Casadesus (1879–1947)
- Markus Leo Goldis (1879–1924)
- Alix Young Maruchess (1889–1963)
- Montagu Cleeve (1894–1993)
- Paul Hindemith (1895-1963)
- Karl Haas (1900–1970)
- Vadim Borisovsky (1900–1972)
- Tosca Kramer (1903–1976)
- Guido Santórsola (1904–1994)
- Emil Seiler (1906–1998)
- Walter Trampler (1915–1997)
- Dr. Gordon B. Childs (1927-2023)
- Alice Harnoncourt (1930–2022)
- Mark Childs (b. 1944)
- Pamela Goldsmith (b. 1946)
- Marcus Thompson (b. 1946)
- Michael Kugel (b. 1947)
- Jennie Hansen (b. 1948)
- Stephen Nachmanovitch (b. 1950)
- Alexander Labko (1930-2013)
- Roy Goodman (b. 1951)
- Gunter Teuffel (b. 1955)
- Garth Knox (b. 1956)
- Richard Fleischman (b. 1963)
- Sviatoslav Belonogov (b. 1965)
- Rachel Barton Pine (b. 1974)
- Julia Rebekka Adler (b. 1978)
- James Wannan
- Hans Vermeersch (b. 1957)
- Tan Dun (b. 1957)
- Jasser Haj Youssef (b. 1980)
- Leonid Pateyuk (b.1990)
- Lucinda Moon
- Daniel Thomason (1934-2020)
- Myron Rosenblum (b. 1933)
- Hans Lauerer
- Rüdiger Müller-Nübling
- Harry Danks (1912–2001)
- Michel Pons
- Marianne Kubitschek-Rônez
- Margit Urbanetz-Vig
- Viera Bilikova
- Joseph Pietropaolo (1934–2014)
- Frank Bellino (1927-2013)
- Joseph Ceo
- Wolfram Just (b. 1936)
- Thomas Georgi
- Elly Winer
- Igor Boguslavsky
- Daniel Urbanowicz
- Karl Stumpf (1907–1988)
- Aurelio Arcidiacono (1915–2001)
- Howard Boatwright (1912–1999)
- Virginia Majewski (1907–1995)
- Lorenzo Nassimbeni
- Frantisek Slavik (1911–1999)
- Jacob Glick (1926–1999)
- Vazgen Muradian (1921–2018)
- Medardo Mascagni (1922–2001)
- Artur Paciorkiewicz
- John Calabrese (1941–2006)
- Jaroslav Horak (1914–2005)
- Katherine McGillivray (1970–2006)
- Guenter Ojstersek (b. 1930)
- Hans-Karl Piltz (1923-2020)
- Paul Shirley (1886–1984)
- Mary Elliott James (1927-2014)
- Jose Blankleder (1909-1998)
- Gordon Maxwell "Max" Tonson-Ward (1918–2015)
- Elizabeth Watson (1945-2021)
- Roland Kato
- Claire Kroyt
- Charles Martin Loeffler (1861–1935)
- Gavin Armstrong (b. 2008)
- Richard Stoelzer
- Arnt Martin (1939-2021)
- Leon King
- Karlina Ivane (b. 1979)
- Yvaine Delahousse
- Carlos Solare
- Matthew Dane
- Haruko Tanabe
- Ryo Terakado (b. 1961)
- Ines Wein
- Adriana Zoppo
- Ludwig Hampe
- Sibylle Hoedt-Schmidt
- Christoph Angerer
- Gheorghe & Simona Balan
- Christiane Guhl
- Simon Steinkühler
- Anne Schumann
- Adrian Susanin (b. 1956)
- Rachel Stott
- Helmut Tzschöckell (1933–1999)
- Maricel Méndez (b.1985)
- Maureen Murchie
- Jürgen Lantz
- Leszek Kuśmirek
- Paul V. Miller (b. 1976)
- Nils Økland (musician) (b. 1961)
- Hyunjung Choi

== See also ==
- Hardanger fiddle
