= Virginia Majewski =

Virginia Majewski (August 30, 1907 – October 9, 1995) was an American viola and viola d’amore player.

== Biography ==
Virginia Majewski was born August 30, 1907, in Norfolk, Virginia, to Julia and Otto Majewski. Her father played violin and directed bands for the US Army, and while he was stationed at Fort Benjamin Harrison in Indiana, Virginia began violin studies with Ferdinand Schaefer. She later studied violin with Gustave Pinlot at the Eastman School of Music, where she was also required to play viola in chamber classes. After graduating with a Bachelor of Arts degree from Eastman, she attended the Curtis Institute of Music as a viola student of Louis Bailly. Majewski earned a Bachelor of Music from the Curtis Institute of Music in 1936 and began her musical career, teaching at the Settlement School of Music in Philadelphia and performing as violist with the Marianne Kneisel String Quartet. While at Curtis, she had enjoyed the loan of a Gasparo da Salò viola that had previously belonged to Bailly. The institute’s founder, Mary Louise Curtis Bok, subsequently arranged for Majewski to purchase this instrument at a fraction of its value.

While in Philadelphia, Majewski earned the admiration of Leopold Stokowski, who wrote favorably about her playing in a letter of introduction to Pierre Monteux and Eugene Ormandy: “I have never heard such wonderful playing with such a large and beautiful tone.” Still, Majewski struggled to obtain an orchestral position suitable to her talents, as remarked by her viola colleague Leonard Mogill: “Since at the time women were not considered for a position in one of the major orchestras, she went to Hollywood where she did much better.” She became principal viola in the MGM orchestra in 1939 and also played principal viola with other studio orchestras, including RKO and Universal. Majewski would go on to a long and storied career as a Hollywood musician, playing on hundreds of film and television scores, including Ben-Hur, North by Northwest, The Dirty Dozen, A Raisin in the Sun, and All the President’s Men. The important viola d’amore solo that she played in Bernard Herrmann’s score for the 1951 film On Dangerous Ground earned her a spot in the opening credits at the insistence of the composer. She also played viola d’amore on a score that Herrmann composed for an episode of The Twilight Zone titled "Little Girl Lost.”

In addition to her film work, Majewski played in backing orchestras on recordings for many notable singers, including Frank Sinatra, Ella Fitzgerald, Rosemary Clooney, Nat King Cole, and Nancy Wilson. As a chamber artist, she performed and recorded with the American Art Quartet from the group’s inception in 1943 through the early 1960s. She also performed on the Grammy-Award winning album “The Heifetz-Piatigorsky Concerts With Primrose, Pennario, and Guests.”

Majewski died on October 9, 1995, in California.

== Legacy ==
Majewski was among the first women hired by the MGM Orchestra. Through her virtuosity and musicianship, she garnered attention and respect for the viola and the viola d’amore among film composers.

A viola scholarship at the Eastman School of Music is named in Virginia Majewski’s honor.

Majewski appeared in the 1992 documentary “Bernard Herrmann: Music for the Movies.”

== Recordings ==
- Laurindo Almeida (guitar), “The Guitar Worlds of Laurindo Almeida.” Selections include Majewski playing viola d’amore, 1961. (Capitol SP-8546)
- Laurindo Almeida (guitar), “The Intimate Bach.” With Virginia Majewski, viola and Vincent De Rosa, horn. 1962. (Capitol P 8582)
- Ludwig van Beethoven, String Quartet No. 10 in E-flat Major, op. 74, “Harp.” American Art Quartet, 1955. (RCA Victor LBC-1073)
- Johannes Brahms, Sextet No. 2 in G Major, op. 36. With Jascha Heifetz and Israel Baker, violins; William Primrose and Virginia Majewski, violas; and Gregor Piatigorsky and Gabor Rejto, violoncellos, recorded 1961. (“The Heifetz-Piatigorsky Concerts,” RCA Victor LD 6159)
- Lukas Foss, String Quartet No. 1. American Art Quartet, 1960. (Columbia Masterworks ML 5476)
- Joseph Haydn, String Quartet in D Major, H. III: 63 “Lark.” American Art Quartet, 1955. (RCA Victor LBC-1073)
- Bernard Hermann, “On Dangerous Ground.” Featuring Virginia Majewski, viola d’amore solo, 1951. (Film Score Monthly CD, volume 6, no. 18, 2003)
- Leon Kirchner, String Quartet No. 1. American Art Quartet, 1954. (Columbia Masterworks ML 4843)
- Felix Mendelssohn, Octet in E-flat Major, op. 20. With Jascha Heifetz, Israel Baker, Arnold Belnick, and Joseph Stepansky, violins; William Primrose and Virginia Majewski, violas; and Gregor Piatigorsky and Gabor Rejto, violoncellos, recorded 1961. (“The Heifetz-Piatigorsky Concerts,” RCA Victor LD 6159)
- W. A. Mozart, Quintet for Clarinet in Strings in A Major, K. 581. With Benny Goodman, clarinet and the American Art Quartet, 1952. (Columbia ML 4483)
- W. A. Mozart, String Quintet in C Major, K. 515. With Jascha Heifetz and Israel Baker, violins; William Primrose and Virginia Majewski, violas; and Gregor Piatigorsky, violoncello, recorded 1964. (RCA Red Seal LSC-3048)
- W. A. Mozart, String Quintet in G Minor, K. 516. With Jascha Heifetz and Israel Baker, violins; William Primrose and Virginia Majewski, violas; and Gregor Piatigorsky, violoncello, recorded 1961. (“The Heifetz-Piatigorsky Concerts,” RCA Victor LD 6159)
- Ernst Toch, Quintet for Piano & Strings, op. 64. With Ernst Toch, piano and the American Art Quartet, 1951. (Alco 1212)
- Ernst Toch, String Quartet No. 10, op. 28. American Art Quartet, 1961. (Contemporary Records M 6009)
- John Vincent, Quartet No. 1 in G. American Art Quartet, 1961. (Contemporary Records M 6008)

== Discography ==
With Chet Atkins

- Chet Atkins in Hollywood (RCA, 1959)

With June Christy

- The Song Is June! (Capitol, 1958)

With Rosemary Clooney

- Love (Reprise, 1961)

With Nat King Cole

- The Nat King Cole Story (Capitol, 1961)
- Nat King Cole Sings/George Shearing Plays (Capitol, 1962)
- Ramblin' Rose (Capitol, 1962)
- Let's Face the Music! (Capitol, 1964)
