= Hugo Walter Voigtlander =

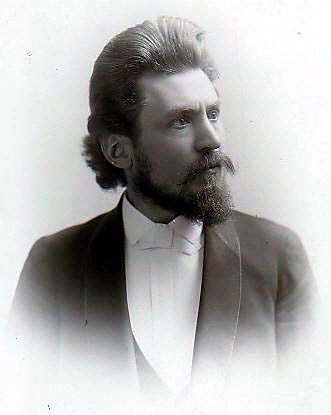
Hugo Walter Voigtlander (1859–1933)

Hugo Walter Voigtlander (November 8, 1859 – January 7, 1933) was a German-American musician who played violin, viola, and viola d'amore. He was also an instrument maker, and a collector and arranger of viola d'amore music. As a youth he studied at the Royal Conservatory of Music in Leipzig and played violin and viola in several professional orchestras in Germany. He emigrated to the United States in 1885 where he spent ten years playing viola and viola d'amore with various professional chamber groups in and around Detroit, Michigan. He then spent two years in Pittsburgh, Pennsylvania playing in the Pittsburgh Symphony Orchestra, and in 1897 moved to New York City, where he played in a number of professional orchestras. In addition to playing viola d'amore, Walter Voigtlander taught viola d'amore, and made and collected numerous arrangements for the instrument.

== Early life in Germany ==
Voigtlander, who usually went by the name Walter, was born on 8 November 1859 in Leipzig, Kingdom of Saxony to Hermann Ludwig and Auguste Voigtländer. On 4 October 1879, he entered the Royal Conservatory of Music in Leipzig, where he studied violin with Henry Schradieck and viola with Friedrich Hermann. While he was a student, he also played violin as an assistant member of the Leipzig Gewandhaus and Theater Orchestra under the baton of such famous conductors as Carl Reinecke, Artur Nikisch, Anton Seidl, and Hans von Bülow.

After he graduated from the Leipzig Conservatory on 27 August 1883, Walter Voigtlander played in the Hamburg Concert Orchestra under the direction of Julius Laube, and in the Richard Wagner Theater Orchestra under Anton Seidl when that orchestra was touring throughout Europe. In 1884 he played viola in the City Orchestra of Düsseldorf, in which position he played under Johannes Brahms and Julius Tausch at the Lower Rhenish Music Festival.

== Emigration to the United States ==
Voigtlander emigrated to the United States in the spring of 1885, and settled in Detroit, Michigan. He became a naturalized U.S. citizen in 1892.

Not long after his arrival in the United States, he married Caroline Petri, and they had one son. Walter and Caroline divorced after a few years. He then married Johanna "Hannah" Elizabeth Nonn in 1893. Walter and Johanna had five children. The family lived in Michigan, Illinois, Pennsylvania, and New York.

== Musical career in the United States ==
Voigtlander pursued a musical career from the time he came to Detroit, where he was a founding member of Detroit Philharmonic Club String Quartet, where he played viola and viola d'amore. When the string quartet disbanded after ten years, he played viola for a short time with the George Lehmann Quartet in Chicago

In 1895, he moved to Pittsburgh, Pennsylvania, where he spent two years as the principal violist in the newly formed Pittsburgh Symphony Orchestra under the direction of Frederic Archer.

By 1897, Walter Voigtlander had moved to New York City. On 18 March 1897, he played two viola d'amore solos in Carnegie Hall accompanied by the Musical Art Society of New York under the direction of Frank Damrosch. Following a 1903 concert by the Kaltenborn Quartet in New York's Mendelssohn Hall, the New York Times critic wrote:

The program contained also a nocturne by Kral for viola and viola d'amore played by Mr. Kaltenborn and Mr. Walter Voightlander, who is making an interesting attempt to revive the charming and almost obsolete instrument with the sympathetic strings and the strange, sweet tone.

Walter Voigtlander spent the rest of his life in New York City as a professional orchestra musician. He played for twelve years in the New York Philharmonic, two years in the Hammerstein Opera Orchestra, and seven years in the Metropolitan Opera Orchestra under Arturo Toscanini.(According his descendants, Voigtlander's association with the Metropolitan Opera Orchestra came to an abrupt end in 1914 with the outbreak of World War I when he was let go from that organization for being a native German.)

== Legacy ==
Voigtlander died in the Bronx, New York City, on 7 January 1933, and is buried in the Woodlawn Cemetery. Besides leaving a legacy as a professional violinist, violist, and viola d'amore player, he is known for other musical accomplishments, as well.

He was an instrument maker in his spare time, and produced a few dozen violins and violas, some of which he sold and later his widow sold several to a small store in the Bronx, New York. Walter sold one of his Mendelssohn-Hermann violas to William H Murphy in October 1914. One of his violas is now in the National Music Museum at the University of South Dakota. The Viola D'Amour is a Viola of extra large size strung with seven strings tuned to the notes of the common chord in D major. Under these string, which are played upon with a bow, are stretched a dozen string of metal, so tuned as to give as representation to all the semi-tones in the scale. These are not touched in playing but they vibrate sympathetically and give a peculiar softness and vibrancy to the tone of the instrument. this tone is sweet and languishing, and peculiarly adapted to sentimental music.

Voigtlander also collected viola d'amore music and made many musical arrangements for the instrument. His music collection is currently housed in the Walter Voigtlander collection of viola d'amore music, ca. 1890–1930 in the New York Public Library for the Performing Arts.

=== Writings ===
Voigtlander made many lasting contributions to the art of viola d'amore playing. His papers contain 142 arrangements and transcriptions of works for the instrument. Many of his arrangements are used in his pedagogical works, to counter the lack of material available in his day for the instrument.

Voigtlander wrote two pedagogical works for the viola d'amore, presumably for his students, whom he mentions indirectly in the preface to the first work, below. Both are available in manuscript at the Library for the Performing Arts (Mus. Res. *MNX Voigtlander. Moderne Viole D’Amour Spieler; and Mus. Res. *MNZ Voigtlander. 42 Studien übertragen für die Viole d’amour):

1) The Modern Viole d'Amour Player, Systematically Arranged Material for the Studie of the Viole d'Amour for the Violin Player (written before 1914). This is a basic pedagogical method, which starts the player from the most elementary elements of the instrument and progresses to a fair level of difficulty. It contains adaptations of violin and viola exercises by many well-known pedagogues. In addition, the work contains a supplement with many solo works and orchestral soli, by many composers, including his own 42 Studies (below), as in his (teaching?) experience, many students of the instrument had lost interest because of the sad lack of material to play. He also expressed the hope that composers would use the work to learn how to write for the instrument. The book also discusses at some length the making of the instrument, including full-sized plans for one, with his own modifications, intended to strengthen the instrument for modern purposes, including remedying its "uneven weak tone...without changing the characteristic tone of the viole d'amour" (Voightlander, c.1913).

2) 42 Studies transcribed for the Viole d'Amour for the Violin Player, and Viola Studies for Self-Study. It has annotations in both German and English. It is the more advanced of the two works, being intended, according to Rosenblum, largely for his own use. Exercises from well-known violin and viola method books are extracted and modified for the viola d'amore.
