= Jean-Paul-Égide Martini =

French composer of German birth (1741–1816)

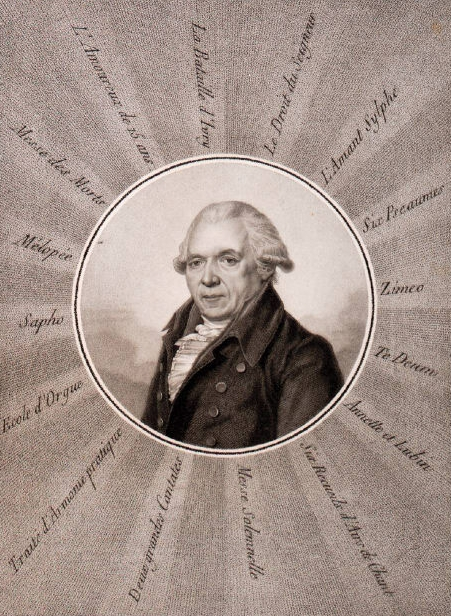
Jean-Paul-Égide Martini in 1813

Jean-Paul-Égide Martini, also known as Jean-Paul-Gilles Martini (31 August 1741 – 14 February 1816) (Note: Some works of reference give his date of death as 10 February 1816, possibly following François-Joseph Fétis's Biographie universelle des musiciens, p. 303, at Google Books (1840). However, the grave certificate Archived 3 February 2016 at the Wayback Machine of Père Lachaise Cemetery clearly shows 14 February as the date of death.) was a French composer of German birth during the classical period. He is best known today for the vocal romance "Plaisir d'amour," on which the 1961 Elvis Presley pop standard "Can't Help Falling in Love" is based. He is often confused with the Italian composer Giovanni Battista Martini, so is sometimes known as Martini Il Tedesco ("Martini The German").

== Life and career ==
Martini was born Johann Paul Aegidius Martin in Freystadt, Bavaria, as the son of the schoolmaster Andreas Martin and his wife Barbara. He was educated at the Jesuit seminary in Neuburg an der Donau and later started a study of philosophy in Freiburg im Breisgau, which he quit unfinished. He temporarily adopted the code name "Schwarzendorf", presumably trying to cover his tracks for the fear of being urged to refund his education costs. He re-adopted his original family name in the Italianized form "Martini" after moving to France. There, he established a successful career as a court musician.

In 1764, he married Marguerite Camelot. Having directed concerts for Queen Marie Antoinette, he adapted to the changing regimes throughout the French Revolution, and later wrote music for Napoleon's marriage as well as for the restored Chapelle royale. His melodic opera L'amoureux de quinze ans, written in 1771, enjoyed great success. In addition, his highly popular church music combined old forms with modern theatricality, and his chansons, including "Plaisir d'amour", were influential. In 1788, he paid 16.000 livres to become surintendant de la musique du roi. He was designated to take office after his predecessor's death; however, the outbreak of the French Revolution prevented this. Martini lost all his functions and took flight to Lyon.

In 1800, he became a professor of composition at the Paris Conservatoire. In 1814, after the Bourbon Restoration, Martini was finally appointed surintendant de la musique du roi, the post that he had been promised more than 25 years earlier. His last composition was a requiem in honour of Louis XVI, which he performed in the Basilica of St Denis on 21 January 1816, the anniversary day of the monarch's execution. Martini died in Paris in February 1816 at the age of 74.

== Selected list of works ==
- Annette and Lubin (opera);
- Sappho (opera, 1794), with libretto by Constance de Pipelet de Leury (i.e. Constance zu Salm-Reifferscheidt-Dyck);
- L'amoureux de quinze ans, ou La double fête (1771);
- Henri IV (1774);
- Le Droit du Seigneur (1783);
- "Plaisir d'amour", song (1784);
- "Prière pour le Roi", political song (1793);
- Scène héroïque pour Napoléon (1814).

== Sources ==
- Bartlet, M. Elizabeth C. (2001). "Martini, Jean-Paul-Gilles". Grove Music Online. Oxford: Oxford University Press. doi:10.1093/gmo/9781561592630.article.17926. ISBN 978-1-56159-263-0. (subscription, Wikilibrary access, or UK public library membership required)
- "Jean Paul Martini" in Classical Music, ed. John Burrows. DK Publishing, Inc: New York, 2005.
- Faust, Elisabeth (2002). Jean Paul Egide Martini und seine Zeit 1741–1816. Ein Oberpfälzer erlangt Weltruhm. Ausstellungskatalog zum Martini-Festival in Neumarkt (in German). Neumarkt: Katholisches Bildungswerk. OCLC 163889558.
