= George Saint-George =

George Saint-George (1841 – 5 January 1924) was a British musical instrument maker and composer.

== Biography ==
He was born in Leipzig, Germany to English parents, and studied violin, piano and theory in Prague and Dresden. He settled in London in the 1860s.

Saint-George was a maker of viols and lutes; he was interested in the viola d'amore, and played the instrument in concerts. He composed a suite for strings L'Ancien Régime, based on 18th-century dance music, and other works.

He died in London on 5 January 1924.

His son Henry Saint-George (1866–1917) was a violinist and academic at the Trinity College of Music; he published two monographs, The Bow: Its History, Manufacture, And Use (1896) and Fiddles: Their Selection, Preservation and Betterment (1910), and was editor of The Strad magazine.

== See also ==
- Joseph Bologne, Chevalier de Saint-Georges - an occasionally confused (but apparently unrelated) French violinist and composer
