= Viola pomposa =

Five-stringed musical instrument

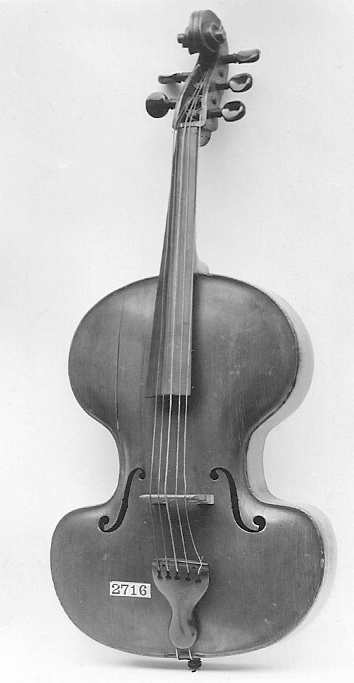
- Classification: Bowed string instrument

Related instruments
- Viol; Violin; Viola; Violoncello piccolo

The viola pomposa (also known as the violino pomposo) is a five-stringed Viola developed around 1725. There are no exact dimensions applicable to all instruments used under this name, although in general the pomposa is slightly wider than a standard viola (hence the Italian adjective "pomposa"). It uses five strings, the bottom four tuned conventionally of a standard viola (C3-G3-D4-A4), with the addition of a high violin E string (E5), giving it a greater range than the orchestral viola; the trade-off comes in a sound which is less resonant than a viola, though still slightly more resonant than a violin. The viola pomposa is played on the arm and has a range from C3 to A6 (or even higher) with fingered notes. Using harmonics, the range can be extended to C8 depending on the quality of the strings.

The viola pomposa should not be confused with the viola da spalla, viola d'amore, the violoncello, or the violoncello piccolo (read Paulinyi, 2012. In English: Paulinyi, 2010), although they did fulfill similar roles in Baroque ensembles. There is extensive debate about the origins of this instrument. Its invention is often attributed to Johann Sebastian Bach, as written about by several musicologists, such as Philipp Spitta (read Spitta, 1951). However, others such as Charles Sanford Terry and Dmitry Badiarov have argued that there is insufficient evidence to make that claim (read Terry, 1932), with Badiarov referring to Bach's invention of the viola pomposa as a myth. (Badiarov, 2007).

Among the late Baroque and early Classical composers who used the instrument are Georg Philipp Telemann (1681–1767; two sections of Der Getreue Musikmeister), Johann Gottlieb Graun (c. 1703–1771; a double concerto with flute), and Christian Joseph Lidarti (1730–1795; at least two sonatas).

By 1800, the instrument was used by principals of major orchestras, although no written scores were published in that century, apart from antiquarian or modernized editions (one of the Lidarti sonatas, heavily edited and with an added cadenza, was republished around 1904).

Late in the twentieth century, several contemporary composers independently rediscovered its potential because of the development of the new synthetic & steel strings, more stable and cheaper than the gut ones. Recent music for the instrument includes works by Justin E.A. Busch, Harry Crowl, Rudolf Haken, and Zoltan Paulinyi.
