= International Association of Music Libraries, Archives and Documentation Centres, German National Branch =

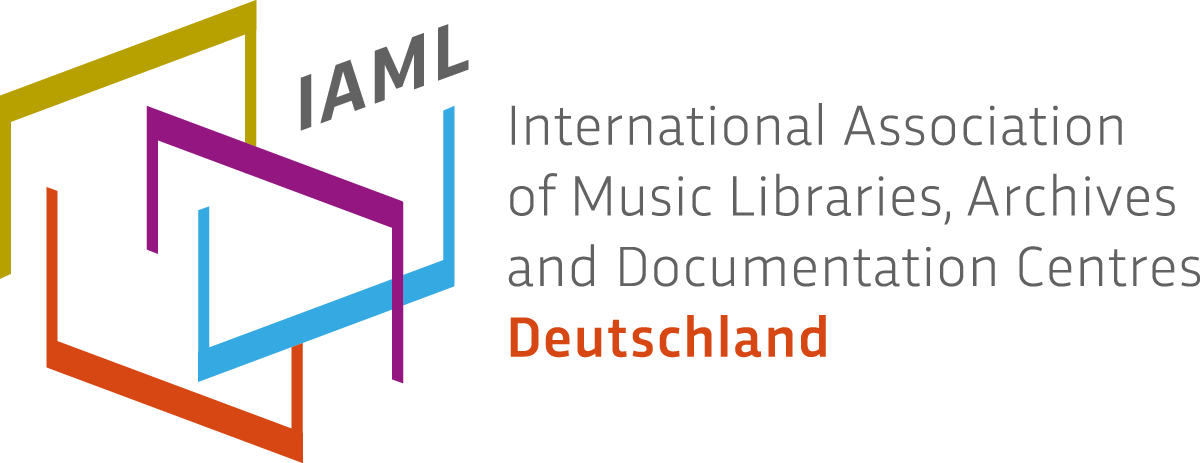
IAML Deutschland Logo

The International Association of Music Libraries, Archives and Documentation Centres, German National Branch (IAML Germany, IAML Deutschland) is the national branch of IAML for the Federal Republic of Germany. The international association IAML is an organisation whose members consist mainly of libraries with music departments, conservatory libraries, broadcasting and orchestra libraries, orchestra archives, university institutes, music documentation centres, music publishers and music retailers. The organisation aims to promote the activities of its members and organise cooperation at an international level.

== Purpose ==
It is committed to promoting public and professional understanding of the importance and requirements of music and music collections. It cooperates with other organisations in the fields of librarianship, bibliography, archival science, documentation, music, music education and musicology. Through its membership in the International Association of Music Libraries, Archives and Documentation Centres (IAML), it promotes international connections and cooperation at the international level.

Through its work, the association promotes music as an indispensable part of art and culture, education and social coexistence, and works to foster an understanding of the cultural significance of music libraries, music archives and music documentation centres.

== History ==
The German IAML branch was founded in 1952. For a long time, the association was not registered as a registered association in the Federal Republic of Germany. Since 2017, the English abbreviation IAML has been used in Germany; until then, the French abbreviation AIBM was used. At the beginning of 1992, the association was registered as an association and granted non-profit status.

== Memberships ==
The association consists of institutional members, individual members and honorary members. Institutional members can be music libraries, music archives, music documentation centres, as well as other institutions that wish to promote the association's goals and are legal entities. In addition, there is the option of individual membership for individuals. Honorary membership can be elected by the general meeting.

== Structure ==
The general meeting is the highest body of the association, which meets once a year during the annual conference. In addition, according to the statutes, there is an elected executive committee, which represents the association internally and externally. The executive committee is elected by the general meeting for a term of three years, after which the members of the executive committee may be re-elected once.

== Activities ==
=== Forum Musikbibliothek ===
The journal Forum Musikbibliothek is published by IAML Germany. It features articles and information from the field of music librarianship, including specialist articles, conference papers, reviews and conference reports. The journal has been published since 1980, initially by the German Library Institute and, since 2012, by Ortus Musikverlag. The issues appear three times a year and are also available free of charge in full text after a twelve-month period.

=== Annual conferences ===
IAML Germany traditionally meets in the second half of September each year for its annual conference.
