= Harald Heckmann =

German musicologist (1924–2023)

- Heckmann, c. 2000
- Born: 6 December 1924; Dortmund, German Reich
- Died: 5 November 2023 (aged 98); Kronberg im Taunus, Hesse, Germany
- Education: Musikhochschule Freiburg; University of Freiburg
- Occupation: Musicologist
- Organizations: Musikhochschule Freiburg; German Archive for the History of Music; German Broadcasting Archive; IAML; RISM; RILM
- Awards: Federal Cross of Merit

Harald Heckmann (6 December 1924 – 5 November 2023) was a German musicologist who focused on source documentation, particularly supported by electronic data processing, and music iconography. Besides teaching at the Musikhochschule Freiburg, he established in 1954 and led until 1971 the German Archive for the History of Music, and afterwards was chairman of the German Broadcasting Archive. He held leading positions of international organisations such as the International Association of Music Libraries, Archives and Documentation Centres (IAML), Répertoire International des Sources Musicales (RISM), and Répertoire International de Littérature Musicale (RILM).

== Biography ==
Born in Dortmund on 6 December 1924, Harald Heckmann studied in Freiburg im Breisgau, musicology with Reinhold Hammerstein, Hermann Zenck and Wilibald Gurlitt as well as art history with Kurt Bauch, history of German literature with Walther Rehm and history with Gerd Tellenbach and Gerhard Ritter. During his studies, he became a member of the AMV Alt-Strasbourg Freiburg (Sondershäuser Verband). He received his doctorate in 1952 with a dissertation about Wolfgang Caspar Printz and his teaching about rhythm. He was then assistant to Wilibald Gurlitt until 1954. Heckmann contributed to the Handwörterbuch der musikalischen Terminologie (Handbook of musical terminology) of the Academy of Sciences and Literature in Mainz. He taught Protestant church music history and hymnology at the Musikhochschule Freiburg.

From 1954 he established the German Archive of the History of Music (Deutsches Musikgeschichtliches Archiv) in Kassel, which he headed until 1971. From 1971 until his retirement in 1991, he was chairman of the German Broadcasting Archive in Frankfurt, a foundation of the ARD.

His work focused on source documentation, particularly supported by electronic data processing, and music iconography, and the collaboration and exchange of information between libraries internationally.

Heckmann died in Kronberg on 5 November 2023, at age 98, after a serious illness.

=== Honorary positions ===
From 1959 to 1974, Heckmann was first secretary general, then until 1977 president of the International Association of Music Libraries, Archives and Documentation Centres (IAML). After his presidency he was appointed honorary president of the association. Between 1960 and 1980, he was secretary, then until 2004 president of the Répertoire International des Sources Musicales (RISM), where he was also honorary president. In 1967 he was co-founder and until 1992 vice president of the Répertoire International de Littérature Musicale (RILM). From 1971 to 2002 Heckmann was a member of the Deutsche Musikgeschichtliche Kommission (German commission of music history). In 1971, he was, with Barry S. Brook and Geneviève Thibault de Chambure, a founder of the Répertoire international d'iconographie musicale at IAML, where he was vice president from 1989. Heckmann belonged to the library commission of the German Research Foundation from 1985 to 1991. He was president of the International Schubert Society from 1990 to 2003, and afterwards its honorary member. He was member and then president of the music advisary board of the German National Library.

Heckmann was, together with Gerhard Mantel, responsible for the chamber music programs of the Robert Schumann Society Frankfurt from 1983 to 2009, and was afterwards an honorary member of the society.

=== Awards ===
Heckmann received the Kassel City Medal in 1979, the Golden Mozart Pin of the International Mozarteum Foundation in 1988 and the Officer's Cross of the Order of Merit of the Federal Republic of Germany in 2000.

== Publications ==
Heckmann's publications are held by the German National Library:

Books

- Wolfgang Caspar Printz (1641–1717) und seine Rhythmuslehre. Dissertation, University of Freiburg 1952
- Elektronische Datenverarbeitung in der Musikwissenschaft, Regensburg 1967

Editions

- Katalog der Filmsammlung. Deutsches Musikgeschichtliches Archiv, Kassel/Basel, continuously from 1953 to 1972
- Documenta Musicologica, series I Druckschriften–Faksimiles, Kassel among others 1953; series II Handschriften–Faksimiles, 1955ff. (from 1961 to 1972 chairman of the respective editorial committees of both series)
- Catalogus Musicus, Eine musikbibliographische Reihe (1963 to 1969 chairman of the publication committee, from 1969 until 1973 together with H. Heussner)
- Festschrift. Mélanges offerts à Vladimir Féderov à l'occasion de son soixante-cinquième anniversaire, introduction, Fontes Artis Musicae 13/1, 1966 (with Wolfgang Rehm)
- Das Tenorlied. Mehrstimmige Lieder in deutschen Quellen 1450–1580. Dt. Musikgesch. Arch. Kassel and Staatliches Institut für Musikforschung Preußischer Kulturbesitz Berlin, vol. 1: Drucke, Kassel among others 1979, vol. 2: Handschriften, 1982, vol. 3: Register, 1986 (with Norbert Böker-Heil and Ilse Kindermann)
- Musikalische Ikonographie, conference report. Hamburg 1991, Laaber 1994 (with Monika Holl and Hans Joachim Marx)
- Nachschlagewerke zur Musik. Internationale Musik-Sach-Lexika vom 17. bis zum frühen 19. Jh., microfiche edition, Munich 1999.

Music editions

- W. A. Mozart, Choruses and entre-acts of Thamos, König in Ägypten, K. 345 (336a), Neue Mozart-Ausgabe (NMA) II/6, vol. 1, Kassel among others. 1956, 2/1973; 1958.
- W. A. Mozart, Music for pantomimes and ballets, NMA II/6, vol. 22, 1963.
- Christoph Willibald Gluck, La rencontre imprévue (Die Pilger von Mekka); NMA IV, vol. 7, 1964.
