= Martha Feldman (musicologist) =

American musicologist

Martha Feldman (born October 1954) is an American musicologist and cultural historian. Since 1990 she has taught at the University of Chicago where she is Ferdinand Schevill Distinguished Service Professor in the Department of Music and the college. Feldman also holds appointments to the faculty of Theater and Performance Studies and serves as affiliated faculty in Romance Languages and Literatures and at the Center for the Study of Gender and Sexuality. Born in Philadelphia to a family of artists, she studied at the University of Pennsylvania, where she earned her doctorate in Music History and Theory in 1987. She is married to composer and jazz musician Patricia Barber.

== Scholarship ==
Feldman's scholarship has centered on vernacular vocal genres and performances, often Italian, from the sixteenth century through the present. Her first monograph, City Culture and the Madrigal at Venice (University of California Press, 1995) is, in the words of Laura Buch, "an interdisciplinary study whose dense multilayering constructs a labyrinthine hall of mirrors that chronicles patterns of Venetian literary, musical, and political thought at mid-sixteenth century." Opera and Sovereignty: Transforming Myths in Eighteenth-Century Italy (University of Chicago Press, 2007), her second book, "fills a notable void" by capturing opera seria's "cultural-historical breadth" and explaining its "remarkable popularity and versatility" while also exploring the new territory of "the multifarious technologies through which opera seria engaged with the ideological horizon of absolutism." In fall 2007 she gave the Ernest Bloch Lectures at the University of California at Berkeley; these talks culminated in The Castrato: Reflections on Natures and Kinds (University of California Press, 2015), which went on to win the American Musicological Society's Kindeldey Award. Of this contribution to the castrato literature, Uta Protz writes,

"What Feldman's meticulously researched, beautifully written and richly illustrated work achieves is to finally shed light on the contradictory rise, voices and eventual demise of the castrati, and, moreover, to convincingly show that these castrated males were produced not as non-men but as idealized men. To this end, the author draws on social history and gender studies as well as on musicology, literary critique and psychology."

Feldman's recent work considers how voices are entangled with race, bodies, and memory, including essays on fugitive voice and the collection The Voice as Something More: Essays toward Materiality, coedited with Judith T. Zeitlin (University of Chicago Press, 2019).

A number of Feldman's projects involve scholarly exchange. The Courtesan’s Arts: Cross-Cultural Perspectives, coedited with Bonnie Gordon (Oxford University Press, 2006, winner of the Ruth A. Solie Award of the American Musicological Society), included essays on early modern courtesans’ music by Feldman's graduate students. Feldman's faculty seminar “The Voice Project,” an interdisciplinary faculty initiative sponsored by UChicago's Neubauer Collegium for Culture and Society for which she was co-principal investigator with David Levin and Judith Zeitlin, led to The Voice as Something More. And the colloquy “Why Voice Now?” (Journal of the American Musicological Society 2015), emerged from a joint session of the American Musicological Society and the Society for Music Theory. The project “Errant Voices: Performances beyond Measure,” co-organized with Bonnie Gordon and Kara Keeling, explores insurgent and resilient voices comparatively across trans, raced, and castrato cases.

== Highlights of special honors ==
- 2001: Dent Medal, awarded by the Royal Musical Association in collaboration with the Directorium of the International Musicological Society
- 2009: Faculty Award (University of Chicago) for Excellence in Graduate Teaching and Mentoring
- 2012: Elected to the American Academy of Arts and Sciences
- 2017-18: President, American Musicological Society
- 2020: Honorary Membership, American Musicological Society

== Major publications and projects ==
Monographs

- The Castrato Phantom: Moreschi, Fellini, and the Sacred Vernacular in Rome (book-in-progress)
- The Castrato: Reflections on Natures and Kinds. Ernest Bloch Lectures, no. 16. Oakland: University of California Press, 2015. (Kinkeldey Award from the American Musicological Society)
- Opera and Sovereignty: Transforming Myths in Eighteenth-Century Italy. Chicago: University of Chicago Press, 2007. (Laing Award from the University of Chicago Press)
- City Culture and the Madrigal at Venice. Berkeley and Los Angeles: University of California Press, 1995. (Bainton Prize of the Sixteenth-Century Studies Conference and the Center for Reformation Research)

Edited volumes and journal issues

- The Voice as Something More: Essays toward Materiality. Co-edited with Judith T. Zeitlin, with afterword by Mladen Dolar. In New Material Histories of Music. Chicago: University of Chicago Press, 2019.
- The Courtesan’s Arts: Cross-cultural Perspectives. Co-edited with Bonnie Gordon. New York: Oxford University Press, 2006. (Solie Award from the American Musicological Society)
- “Music and Sound at the Edges of History.” Co-edited with Nicholas Mathew. Special issue of Representations 154, no. 1 (Spring 2021).

Select journal articles

- “Music Histories from the Edge,” co-authored with Nicholas Mathew, Representations, special issue on “Music and Sound at the Edges of History,” vol. 154, issue 1 (Spring 2021): 1–9, coedited with Nicholas Mathew.
- “Fugitive Voice,” Representations 154, no. 1 (Spring 2021): 10–22.
- “Love, Race, and Resistance: The Fugitive Voice of Nina Simone,” in The Female Voice in the Twentieth Century: Material, Symbolic, and Aesthetic Dimensions, edited by Serena Facci and Michela Garda (New York and London: Routledge, 2021), Chap. 6, pp. 83–101.
- “Voice Gap Crack Break,” in The Voice as Something More: Essays toward Materiality, coedited by Martha Feldman and Judith T. Zeitlin (University of Chicago Press, 2019), 188–208.
- “The Castrato as a Rhetorical Figure,” in Rhetoric and Drama, edited by D.S. Mayfield (Berlin: De Gruyter, 2017), pp. 71–96.
- “Castrato Acts,” The Oxford Handbook of Opera, ed. Helen M. Greenwald (Oxford: Oxford University Press, 2014, pp. 395–418.
- “Denaturing the Castrato,” Opera Quarterly 24/3-4 (fall 2008): 178–199.
- “The Courtesan’s Voice: Petrarchan Lovers, Pop Philosophy, and Oral Traditions,” in The Courtesan’s Arts: Cross-cultural Perspectives, co-ed. with Bonnie Gordon (Oxford University Press, 2006), 103–23, 354–56.
- "Authors and Anonyms: Recovering the Anonymous Subject in Cinquecento Vernacular Objects," in Music and the Cultures of Print, ed. Kate van Orden (Garland Publishing Inc., 2000), 166–99.
- "Magic Mirrors and the Seria Stage: Thoughts toward a Ritual View," Journal of the American Musicological Society 48 (1995): 423–84.
