= Wolfgang Rehm =

German musicologist

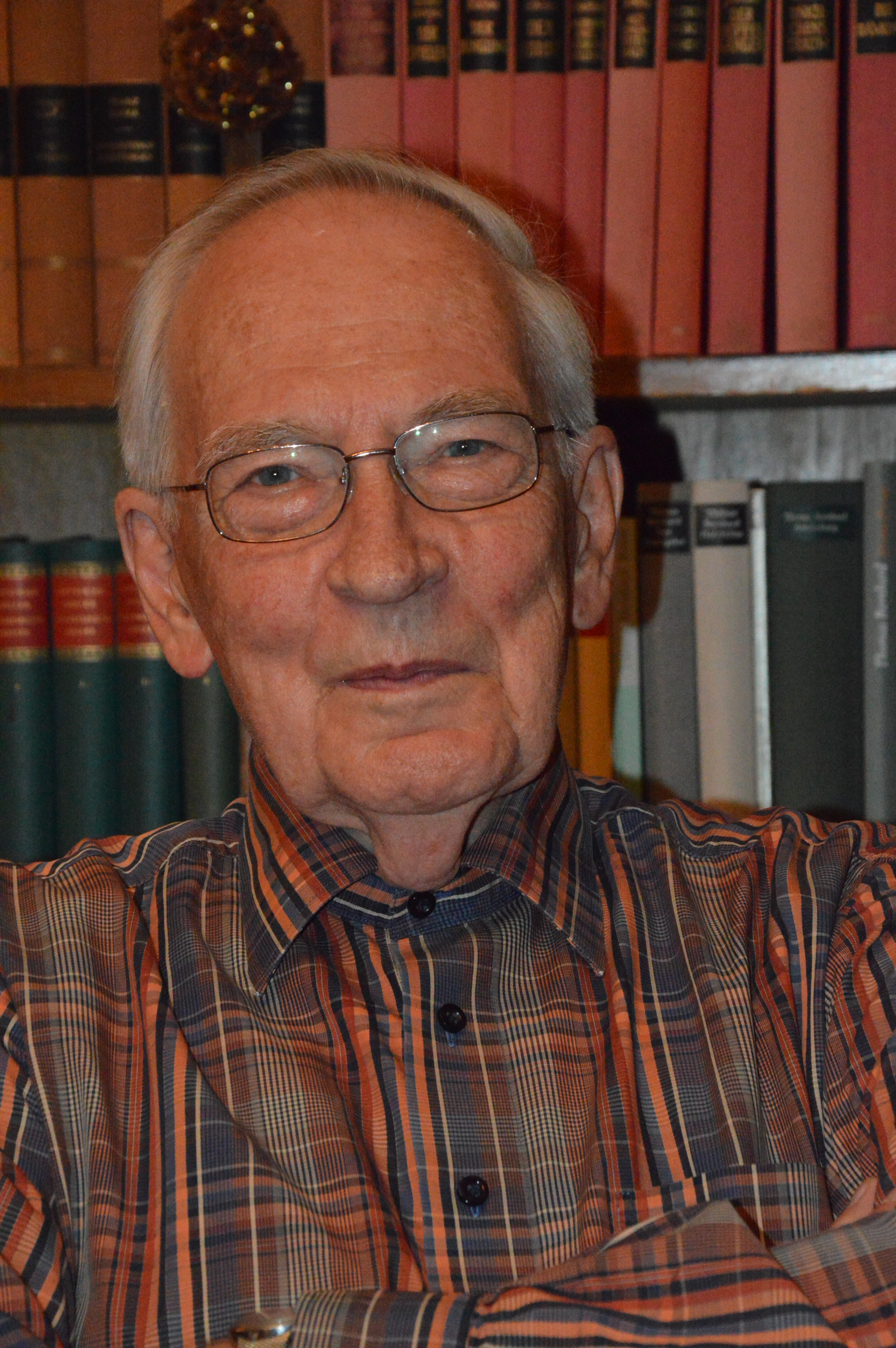
- Wolfgang Rehm in 2014
- Born: 3 September 1929; Munich, Bavaria
- Died: 6 April 2017 (aged 87); Groß-Gerau, Hesse, Germany
- Education: University of Freiburg
- Occupations: Musicologist; Music editor
- Organizations: Bärenreiter; Kasseler Musiktage; Mozart Week; International Association of Music Libraries, Archives and Documentation Centres; Répertoire International des Sources Musicales
- Known for: Neue Mozart-Ausgabe
- Father: Walther Rehm
- Awards: Austrian Decoration for Science and Art; Mozart Medal

Wolfgang Rehm (3 September 1929 – 6 April 2017) was a German musicologist active mostly in music publishing, especially the Neue Mozart-Ausgabe. He was on the board of its editorial team for decades, and personally edited operas and piano music. While he worked on it for Bärenreiter in Kassel, he was responsible for the program of the Kasseler Musiktage festival, and after he moved for further work to Salzburg, he shaped the program of the Mozart Week. He was also a member of the International Association of Music Libraries, Archives and Documentation Centres from 1959 to 1985, and also a founding member and treasurer of the Répertoire International des Sources Musicales data base.

== Career ==
Born in Munich, the son of Walther Rehm, Wolfgang studied musicology from 1948 to 1952 at the University of Freiburg (subsidiary subjects: modern German literary history and medieval history) and graduated in 1952 with a work on the chanson work of the Franco-Flemish composer Gilles Binchois.

From 1952 to 1954, Rehm worked as a trainee at the music publishing house Breitkopf & Härtel in Wiesbaden and began on 1 May 1954 as a research assistant and editor at Bärenreiter in Kassel, initially with a focus on complete editions, such as the Neue Mozart-Ausgabe (NMA) in 1955. In 1960, he became the general editor of the NMA, together with Wolfgang Plath, who was later succeeded by Dietrich Berke. Rehm was the chief editor of Bärenreiter from 1971, and from 1975 a member of the management board with responsibility for book and music production. The next complete edition at Bärenreiter was the Neue Schubert-Ausgabe.

In 1981/82 Rehm moved to Salzburg and was a full-time member of the editorial board of the NMA from 1981 to 1994. He participated until 30 June 2007, the date of the official completion of the 132 volumes of the NMA, for which Rehm shared responsibility.

From 1959 to 2002, Rehm was a member of the boards of various specialist and artistically oriented societies and associations, including the Gesellschaft fur Musikforschung, the Internationaler Arbeitskreis für Musik, and the International Association of Music Libraries, Archives and Documentation Centres (IAML), which he served as treasurer from 1959 to 1985. He was a founding member of Répertoire International des Sources Musicales (RISM), an international data base of musical resources. He served as its treasurer from 1967 to 1990. He was at times a member of the editorial board of the Gluck-Gesamtausgabe and the New Berlioz Edition.

From 1975 to 1986, Rehm was responsible for the program of the Kasseler Musiktage, and from 1985 to 1997 of the Mozart Week in Salzburg. From 1965 he was a member of the Central Institute for Mozart Research (today: Academy for Mozart Research) at the International Mozarteum Foundation, Salzburg, serving on the board of trustees from 1991 to 1999.

Rehm died in Groß-Gerau on 6 April 2017.

== Publications ==
- Rehm, Wolfgang, ed. (1957). Die Chansons von Gilles Binchois (1400–1460). Musikalische Denkmäler 2. Mainz: Schott Music. OCLC 20617065.
- Editions in the context of the Neue Mozart-Ausgabe (NMA):
  - 1991 Così fan tutte
  - 1998 supplements, Volume 3: Piano Music (both with Faye Ferguson)
  - Critical reports on NMA volumes submitted earlier:
    - 1996 on X/29: Werke zweifelhafter Echtheit. Volume 2 (together with Franz Giegling)
    - 1998 on V/18: Klavierkonzerte (Piano Concertos). Volume 8
    - 1998 on IX/25: Klaviersonaten (Piano Sonatas). Volumes 1 and 2
    - 1999 on II/5/9: Il re pastore (together with Pierluigi Petrobelli)
    - 2000 on IX/27: Klavierstücke Band 1 und 2 (Piano Pieces)
    - 2003 on II/5/17: Il dissoluto punito ossia il Don Giovanni
    - 2004 on II/5/2: La finta semplice
- Die Neue Mozart-Ausgabe. Texte. Bilder. Chronik 1955–2007 (together with Dietrich Berke and with the collaboration of Miriam Pfadt), Kassel etc. 2007
- Mozarts Nachlass und die Andrés. Dokumente zur Vertheilung und Verlosung von 1854, Offenbach am Main, 1999
- Musikwissenschaftliche Einführung zur Faksimile-Ausgabe von Mozarts Autograph zum Don Giovanni KV 527, in Mozarts Operas in Facsimile IV, The Packard Humanities Institute, Los Altos, California, 2009

== Honours ==
- 1977: Austrian Decoration for Science and Art first class
- 1979: Mozart Medal in silver of the International Mozarteum Foundation
- 1991: Honorary professor of the state of Baden-Württemberg
- 2007: Mozart Medal in gold of the International Mozarteum Foundation

Rehm was also an honorary member of most of the professional societies for which he worked during his career.
