= Deutsches Musikinformationszentrum =

German music organisation

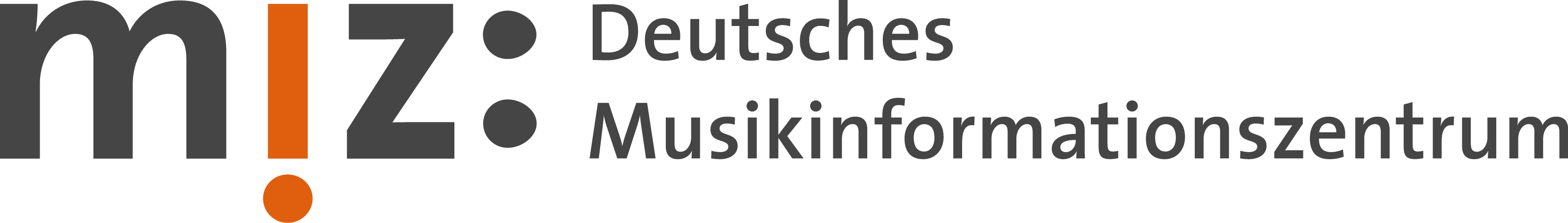
Logo Deutsches Musikinformationszentrum

The Deutsches Musikinformationszentrum (MIZ) is the information and documentation institution of the Deutscher Musikrat. It has set itself the task of providing information about the structures, tasks and developments of the widely ramified musical life in Germany. To this end, it provides statistics, structural data and background information and offers guidance on current funding opportunities, specialist events and further education and training courses in the field of music.

== Organisation ==
The Deutsches Musikinformationszentrum (MIZ) is part of the Deutscher Musikrat gemeinnützige Projektgesellschaft mbH with headquarters in Bonn. The sole shareholder of the project company is the Deutscher Musikrat, based in Berlin. The project company and registered association together form the Deutscher Musikrat.

The MIZ is funded by the Beauftragter der Bundesregierung für Kultur und Medien (BKM), by the Kulturstiftung der Länder, the City of Bonn and privately by the Gesellschaft zur Verwertung von Leistungsschutzrechten (GVL). The private sponsor is the music publisher Hal Leonard Europe.

== Tasks and information base ==
As an information and documentation facility of the German Music Council, the German Music Information Centre (MIZ) bundles data and facts about musical life in Germany on a broad basis. The spectrum ranges from musical education and training to amateur music-making, professional music practice and events to media and the music industry. It thus pursues the goal of providing an orientation on the widely ramified and diverse musical landscape in Germany and presenting musical life primarily from the perspective of its institutions. Central areas of responsibility are:

- Description of the institutions of musical life, including ensembles, associations, orchestras, music theatre, funding bodies and music festivals with details of activities, management structures and contact details,
- Evaluation and processing of music-related statistics from various music associations, research institutions and official bodies,
- Publication of specialist articles, including on the topics of music education and training, orchestras and music theatre, independent ensembles, music in the church, jazz, world music and pop, as well as the music industry and media,
- Presentation of structural data in the form of topographical representations, among others on educational institutions, music theatres and musical instrument making,
- Collection of cultural policy documents, daily news, specialist literature and further sources from the field of institutionalised musical life,
- Information on national and regional music competitions, music prizes and scholarships, as well as further education and training opportunities in music.

In addition, the MIZ takes up current topics and presents them in separate focal points. The most comprehensive publications published in 2017 were the information portal "Church Music – Music in Religions" and in 2018 the portal "Musik und Integration". At irregular intervals, the MIZ also publishes print publications, most recently the compendium "Musikleben in Deutschland", which also appeared in an English translation.

To safeguard its tasks, the MIZ works closely with the network of the German Music Council.

== History ==
The Deutsches Musikinformationszentrum (MIZ) was founded in 1997 under the umbrella of the German Music Council. On 26 February 1998, the official opening took place in the Haus der Kultur in Bonn. The new institution took over, among other things, the editorship of the Musik-Almanach, which the German Music Council had published since 1986. The Music Almanac listed the institutions of musical life in Germany (associations, music theatre, orchestras etc.) and presented all institutions with basic information and contact details. In 2007, the Musik-Almanach appeared in its seventh edition and for the last time in printed form. Since then, the data has been published exclusively online in the institutional database on the MIZ website.

In addition to updating the institutional database, the MIZ was assigned numerous other tasks when it was founded, which aimed to focus on musical life as a whole. These included the publication of statistics, the provision of background information on various areas of institutionalised musical life and the compilation of offers for further and continuing musical education. Since then, these offers have been continuously expanded and extended.

== Advisory board ==
Since its foundation, the work of the MIZ has been accompanied by an advisory board, which includes representatives from professional associations, collecting societies, documentation, science and teaching as well as cultural policy. The first chairman of the advisory board in 1997 was the then executive director of the Stiftung Deutsches Rundfunkarchiv Frankfurt und Potsdam-Babelsberg, Joachim-Felix Leonhard. In 2020, Robert von Zahn, Secretary General of the Landesmusikrat Nordrhein-Westfalen, took over the office.

== International contacts ==
As a member of The International Association of Music Information Centres (IAMIC), the MIZ cooperates with more than 40 national music information centres worldwide and acts as a specialist information and referral centre for enquiries, also from other European and international countries.
