= Répertoire International d'Iconographie Musicale =

The Association Répertoire International d'Iconographie Musicale (RIdIM) (International Repertory of Musical Iconography; Internationales Repertorium der Musikikonographie) provides cataloguing of visual culture related to music, dance, and the dramatic arts worldwide. It also supports research projects, workshops and conferences.

== History and context ==
RIdIM was founded on 26 August 1971 by Barry S. Brook, Geneviève Thibault de Chambure, Harald Heckmann, Howard Mayer Brown and Walter Salmen. RIdIM is one of the four Répertoires (or "R" projects) established by the International Musicological Society (IMS), the International Association of Music Libraries, Archives, and Documentation Centres (IAML), and the International Committee of Musical Instrument Museum Collections (CIMCIM) of the International Council of Museums (ICOM); the "R" projects include also Le Répertoire international des sources musicales (RISM), Le Répertoire international de littérature musicale (RILM), and Le Répertoire international de la presse musicale (RIPM).
