= International Musicological Society =

Musicological organization

- Type: Nonprofit organization
- Purpose: Advancement of musicological research on the basis of international cooperation
- Headquarters: Basel, Switzerland
- President: Kate van Orden
- Website: www.musicology.org

The International Musicological Society (IMS) is a membership-based organisation for musicology at the international level, with headquarters in Basel, Switzerland. It seeks the advancement of musicological research through international cooperation.

== Overview ==
The International Musicological Society was founded on 30 September 1927 on the initiative of Henry Prunières, during the celebration of the centenary of the death of Ludwig van Beethoven. His proposal aimed to resurrect the International Music Society, which had dissolved in 1914, and was met with great interest.

The IMS organizes an international congress every five years, in years ending on 2 or 7. At these congresses, members elect the Directorium (Board of directors). The most recent congress took place in Athens in 2022. In between these congresses, they also sponsor international symposia on specialized subjects.

The IMS collaborates closely with the International Association of Music Libraries, Archives and Documentation Centres to produce several directories:

- Répertoire International d'Iconographie Musicale (RIdIM)
- Répertoire International de Littérature Musicale (RILM)
- Répertoire International de la Presse Musicale (RIPM)
- Répertoire International des Sources Musicales (RISM)

== Publications ==
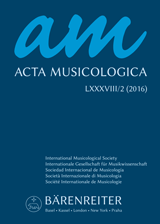

The IMS publishes a double-blind peer-reviewed journal twice a year, Acta Musicologica, addressing musicological research of international importance. Acta has been published by Bärenreiter since 1954 and is self-published by the IMS as an online and print-on-demand publication from 2023 onward. The current editors are Jen-yen Chen, Arnulf Christian Mattes, and Luisa Nardini.

== Membership ==
The IMS membership includes individuals, institutions, libraries, and organizations. Among its organizational members are: the American Musicological Society (AMS), the Royal Musical Association, the Schweizerische Musikforschende Gesellschaft, the Paul Sacher Stiftung, the Deutsches Musikgeschichtliches Archiv, the Deutsche Gesellschaft für Musikforschung, the Staatliches Institut für Musikforschung Berlin, the Internationale Stiftung Mozarteum, the Österreichische Akademie der Wissenschaften, the Società Italiana di Musicologia, the Société française de musicologie, the Société Belge de musicologie, the Danish Musicological Society, the Vereniging van Nederlandse Muziekgeschiedenis, the Societat Catalana de Musicologia, The Friends of Music Society, Greece, The Musicological Society of Japan, and the Musicological Society of Australia.

== List of presidents ==
- Guido Adler (1927, Honorary President)
- Peter Wagner (ru) (1927–31)
- Edward J. Dent (1932–49, Honorary President)
- Knud Jeppesen (1949–52)
- Albert Smijers (1952–55)
- Paul Henry Lang (1955–58)
- Friedrich Blume (1958–61)
- Donald J. Grout (1961–64)
- Vladimir Fédorov (1964–67)
- Kurt von Fischer (1967–72)
- Eduard Reeser (nl) (1972–77)
- Ludwig Finscher (1977–82)
- Ivan Supičić (hr) (1982–87)
- Christoph-Hellmut Mahling (1987–92)
- Stanley Sadie (1992–97)
- László Somfai (1997–2002)
- David Fallows (2002–07)
- Tilman Seebass (2007–12)
- Dinko Fabris (2012–17)
- Daniel K. L. Chua (2017–22)
- Kate van Orden (2022–27)
