= Cantata Cycle 1716–1717 (Telemann) =

Series of cantatas by Georg Philipp Telemann

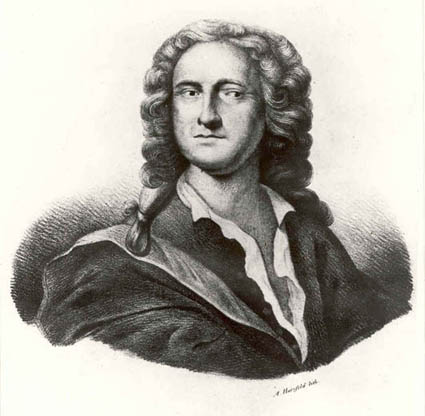
Georg Philipp Telemann (1681–1767)

The Cantata Cycle 1716–1717 (also known as the Concertante Cycle) is a series of cantatas written by Georg Philipp Telemann while he was Frankfurt's Director of Municipal Music. In addition to composing music for civic occasions, he conducted and composed for several churches in the city, including the Katharinenkirche and the Barfüßerkirche where he was Kapellmeister. During his time in Frankfurt (1712–1721), he composed five new year-long cycles of sacred music for the Sundays and holy days of the ecclesiastical calendar. He also completed several cycles which he had begun earlier in Eisenach where he had been the leader of the court singers. After taking up his post in Hamburg in 1721, he continued to supply Frankfurt with cantata cycles—one complete cycle every three years, as part of an arrangement to maintain his citizenship of that city.

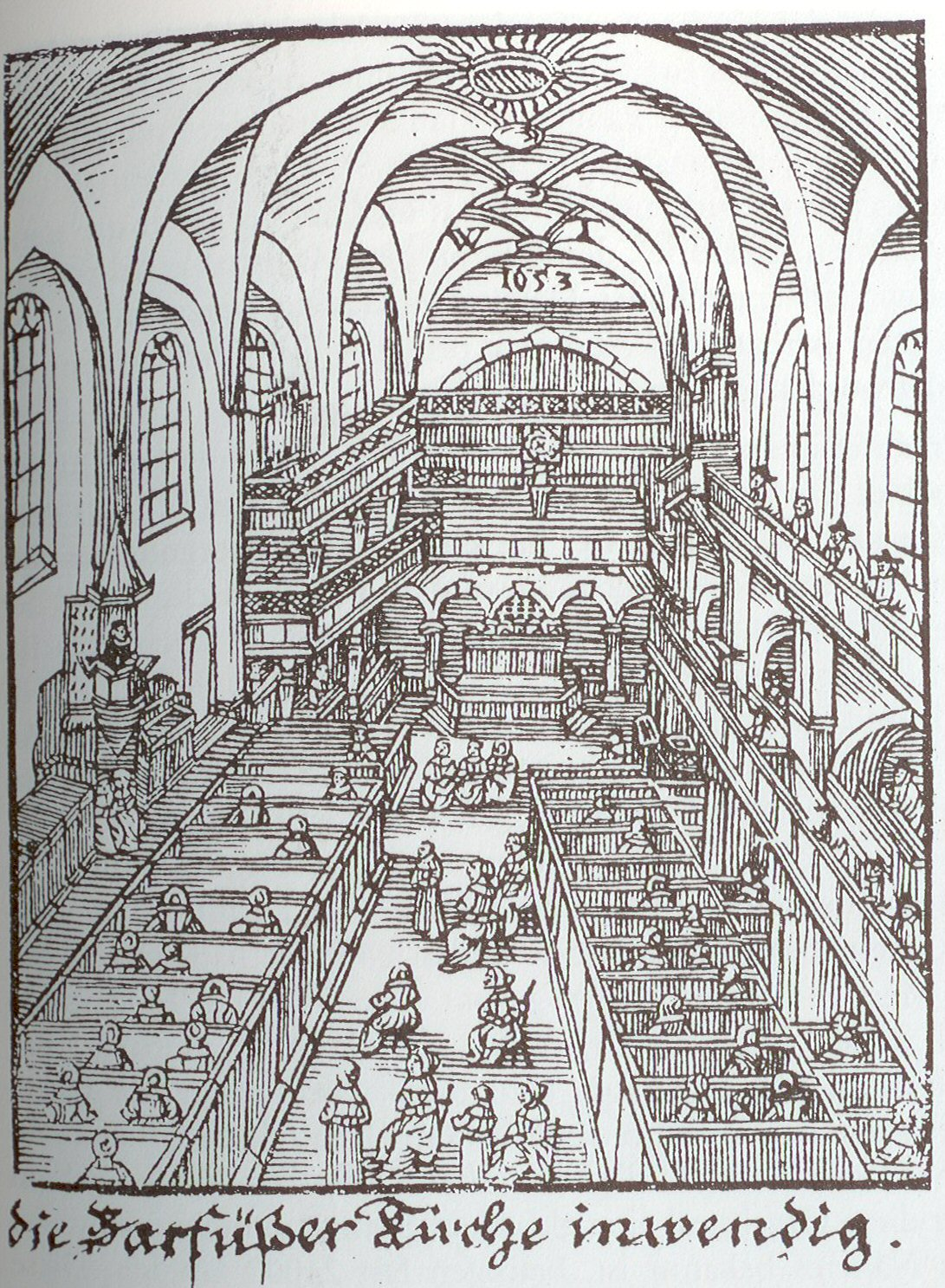
Interior of the Barfüßerkirche in Telemann's time.

== Early performances and the texts of the cantatas ==
The cycle was first performed in 1716/17 simultaneously in Frankfurt and in Eisenach. It was intended to become Telemann's third cycle of cantatas set completely to texts by his old companion Erdmann Neumeister. However, due to his numerous obligations Neumeister was not able to deliver the texts after Pentecost. Therefore Telemann commissioned the young poet and student of theology Gottfried Simonis (b. 1692) to author the missing texts from Trinity Sunday onwards.

When Telemann repeated the cantata cycle in Frankfurt in 1719–1720, Neumeister made a new attempt to deliver the missing texts: he added the texts for the 4th to 6th Sundays after Epiphany (Sundays that did not exist in 1717, as Easter fell early on 28 March), plus the Sundays from Trinity onwards. However, Neumeister again failed to deliver the texts after the 14th Sunday after Trinity, so Telemann again had to improvise: for some of the Sundays he wrote texts of his own, and added two new texts by Gottfried Simonis. Some of the texts however are of yet unknown origin.

It was only in his 1726 printing of the cantata cycle's texts, that Neumeister delivered the complete texts. The new texts however were not set to music by Telemann.

Gottfried Simonis on the other hand also supplemented his cycle with texts for the time from Advent to Pentecost, thus completing a full year's cycle. Telemann also composed these new texts and in 1720/21 performed the cantata cycle, which has come to known as Simonis' Neues Lied (or 2nd Concertante Cycle).

== Scores ==
Between 1712 and Telemann's death in 1767 copyists in Frankfurt produced a large collection of performance materials for his religious cantatas, which are currently preserved in the Frankfurt University Library (formerly City and University Library). There are relatively few of these scores available in modern editions. However, the Frankfurt Telemann Society has begun a project in conjunction with Habsburger Verlag to publish modern editions of the scores, particularly the early Frankfurt cantata cycles. These appear in the Frankfurter Telemann-Ausgaben series.

== List of cantatas in the 1716–1717 cycle ==
Feast Day	TWV Number	Title	RISM	Sources	Scoring	Notes
Advent 1	TWV 1:1234	Saget der Tochter Zion	RISM 450004600	Frankfurt Ff 1314a	(S)ATB (Soprano Rip. missing), 2 Ob, 2 Vl, Vla, Cb, Bc	
Advent 2	TWV 1:811	Hütet euch, dass eure Herzen	RISM 450004421	Frankfurt Ff 1138	SATB, 2 Ob, 2 Vl, Vla, Vc, Bc	
Advent 3	TWV 1:1129	Mein Kind, willtu Gottes Diener sein	RISM 450004546	Frankfurt Ff 1262	SATB, 2 Ob, 2 Vl, Vla, Vc, Bc	
Advent 4	TWV 1:914	Ihr seid alle Gottes Kinder	RISM 450004483	Frankfurt Ff 1200	SATB, 2 Ob, 2 Vl, Vla, Vc, Bc	
Christmas	TWV 1:1450	Uns ist ein Kind geboren	RISM 450004698, RISM 240000224, RISM 302000382, RISM 454600530, RISM lit30022909	Frankfurt Ff 1414	SATB, 2 Ob, 2 Cl, Ti, 2 Vl, Vla, Vc, Bc	
Christmas	TWV 1:1430	Und da die Engel von ihnen gen Himmel fuhren	RISM 450004691	Frankfurt Ff 1407	SATB, 2 Ob, 2 Vl, Vla, Vc, Bc	
Christmas 3	TWV 1:1017	Kündlich gross ist das Geheimnis	RISM 450004503, RISM lit30022918	Frankfurt Ff 1219	SATB, 2 Ob, 2 Vl, Vla, Vc, Bc	
Sunday after Christmas	TWV 1:157	Dancket denn Herrn denn er ist freundlich	RISM 450003782, RISM lit30022910	Frankfurt Ff 814	SATB, 2 Ob, 2 Co, 2 Vl, Vla, Vc, Bc	
Feast of the Circumcision of Christ	TWV 1:1726	Wünschet Jerusalem Glück	RISM 450004828, RISM 452513225, RISM 150204800, RISM lit30022908	Frankfurt Ff 1545	SATB, 2 Ob, 2 Cc, 2 Vl, Vla, Vc, Bc	
Sunday after New Year's	TWV 1:26	Ach Herr! Wie ist meiner Feinde so viel	RISM 450003709, RISM lit30022942	Frankfurt Ff 739	SATB, 2 Ob, 2 Vl, Vla, Vc, Bc	
Epiphany	TWV 1:1058	Lobet den Herrn, alles Heiden (Psalm 117)	RISM 450004528, RISM 806042568	Frankfurt Ff 1244	SATB, 2 Ob, 2 Vl, Vla, Vc, Bc	
1st Sunday after Epiphany	TWV 1:431	Eins bitte ich vom Herrn	RISM 450004240, RISM 452513227	Frankfurt Ff 957	SATB, 2 Ob, 2 Vl, Vla, Vc, Bc	
2nd Sunday after Epiphany	TWV 1:332	Die Ehe soll ehrlich gehalten werden	RISM 450003878	Frankfurt Ff 911	SATB, 2 Ob, 2 Vl, Vla, Vc, Bc	
3rd Sunday after Epiphany	TWV 1:1394	Spricht der Herr aber also, Ich habe nicht Lust	RISM 450004681	Frankfurt Ff 1396	SATB, 2 Ob, 2 Vl, Vla, Vc, Bc	
Purification of the Virgin	TWV 1:245	Der Gerechte kommt um	RISM 450003832, RISM 452513229, RISM 452513435	Frankfurt Ff 864	SATB, 2 Ob, 2 Vl, Vla, Vc, Bc	
Septuagesima	TWV 1:501	Es ist ein großer Gewinn, wer gottselig	RISM 450004268, RISM lit30022938	Frankfurt Ff 985	SATB, 2 Vl, Vla, Vc, Cb, Bc	
Sexagesima	TWV 1:1295	Selig sind, die Gottes Wort hören	RISM 450004630, RISM lit30022934	Frankfurt Ff 1344	SATB, 2 Ob, 2 Vl, Vla, Vc, Bc	
Estomihi	TWV 1:1316	Siehe, das ist Gottes Lamm	RISM 450004647, RISM 454600525	Frankfurt Ff 1361	SATB, 2 Ob, 2 Vl, Vla, Vc, Bc	
Invocavit	TWV 1:1279	Seid stark in dem Herrn und in seiner Macht	RISM 450004624	Frankfurt Ff 1338	SATB, 2 Ob, 2 Vl, Vla, Vc, Bc	
Reminiscere	TWV 1:843	Ich hatte viel Bekümmernisse in meinem Herzen	RISM 450004439	Frankfurt Ff 1156	SATB, 2 Ob, 2 Vl, Vla, Vc, Bc	
Oculi	TWV 1:586	Gedenket an Jesum, der ein solches Widersprechen	RISM 450004316	Frankfurt Ff 1032	SATB, 2 Ob, 2 Vl, Vla, Vc, Bc	
Laetare	TWV 1:156	Da Jesus nun merckte, daß sie kommen würden	RISM 450003778	Frankfurt Ff 810	SATB, 2 Ob, 2 Vl, Vla, Vc, Bc	
Judica	TWV 1:367	Die Wahrheit fällt auf die Gasse	RISM 450003890	Frankfurt Ff 923	SATB, 2 Ob, Cl, 2 Vl, Vla, Vc, Bc	
Palm Sunday	TWV 1:141	Christus hat gelitten für uns, und uns	RISM 450003768	Frankfurt Ff 800	SATB, 2 Ob, 2 Vl, Vla, Vc, Bc	
Feast of the Annunciation	TWV 1:1326	Siehe, eine Jungfrau ist schwanger	RISM 450004652, RISM 806042569	Frankfurt Ff 1366	SATB, 2 Ob, 2 Fg, 2 Vl, Vla, Vc, Bc	
Easter	TWV 1:816	Ich bin der Erste und der Letzte	RISM 450004426, RISM 210000065	Frankfurt Ff 1143, Dresden Mus.2392-E-560a	SATB, 2 Ob, 2 Cl, Ti, 2 Vl, Vla, Vc, Bc	
Easter Monday	TWV 1:873	Ich weiss, dass mein Erlöser lebt	RISM 450004452, RISM 469066000, RISM lit30022940	Frankfurt Ff 1170	SATB, 2 Ob, 2 Vl, Vla, Vc, Bc	
Easter Tuesday	TWV 1:175	Da sie aber davon redeten	RISM 450003779	Frankfurt Ff 811	SATB, 2 Vl, Vla, Vc, Bc	
Quasimodogeniti	TWV 1:1433	Und die Apostel sprachen zu dem Herrn	RISM 450004693, RISM 806042574	Frankfurt Ff 1409	SATB, 2 Ob, 2 Vl, Va, Vc, Bc	
Misericordias Domini	TWV 1:317	Der Sohn Gottes hat mich geliebet	RISM 450003870, RISM 806042570	Frankfurt Ff 903	SATB, 2 Ob, 2 Vl, Va, Vc, Bc	
Jubilate	TWV 1:196	Das weiss ich fürwahr	RISM 450003801, RISM 806042566	Frankfurt Ff 833	SATB, 2 Ob, 2 Vl, Va, Vc, Bc	
Cantate	TWV 1:150	Christus ist nicht eingegangen	RISM 450003774	Frankfurt Ff 806	SATB, 2 Ob, 2 Vl, Va, Vc, Bc	
Rogate	TWV 1:459	Erhöre mich, wenn ich rufe	RISM 450004248, RISM 464111035, RISM lit30022952	Frankfurt Ff 965, Berlin Mus.ms.autogr. Telemann, G. P. 50	SATB, 2 Ob, Cn, 3 Tb, 2 Vl, Va, Vc, Bc	
Ascension	TWV 1:642	Gott fähret auf mit Jauchzen	RISM 450004343, RISM 210000051, RISM 210000049, RISM 210000050, RISM 454600526	Frankfurt Ff 1059, Dresden Mus.2392-E-564, Dresden Mus.2392-E-564a, Dresden Mus.2392-E-564b	SATB, 2 Ob, Cl, 2 Vl, Va, Vc, Bc	
Exaudi	TWV 1:1613	Wer will uns scheiden von der Liebe Gottes	RISM 450004770	Frankfurt Ff 1486	SATB, 2 Ob, 2 Vl, Va, Cb, Bc	
Pentecost	TWV 1:634	Gott der Hoffnung erfülle euch	RISM 450004339, RISM 450063621, RISM 452503008, RISM 1001029079	Frankfurt Ff 1055	SATB, 2 Ob, 2 Cl, 2 Co, Ti, 2 Vl, Va, Vc, Bc	formerly misattributed to Johann Sebastian Bach, BWV 218
Pentecost Monday	TWV 1:165	Daran ist erschienen die Liebe Gottes	RISM 450003786, RISM 453000522, RISM lit30022905	Frankfurt Ff 818	SATB, 2 Ob, 2 Vl, Va, Vc, Bc	
Pentecost Tuesday	TWV 1:398	Durch Christum habt ihr gehöret	RISM 450004226, RISM 454600647	Frankfurt Ff 943	SATB, 2 Ob, 2 Vl, Va, Vc, Bc	

== Continuation of the 1716–1717 cantata cycle on texts by Gottfried Simonis ==
Feast Day	TWV Number	Title	RISM	Sources	Scoring	Notes
Trinity	TWV 1:607	Gelobet sei Gott und der Vater	RISM 450004328, RISM lit30028336	Frankfurt Ff 1044	SATB, 2 Ob, 2 Vl, Va, Vc, Bc	
1st Sunday after Trinity	TWV 1:542	Es wird ein unbarmherzig Gericht	RISM 450004294, RISM lit41002115	Frankfurt Ff 1010	SATB, 2 Ob, 2 Vl, Va, Vc, Cb, Bc	
2nd Sunday after Trinity	TWV 1:1540	Weil ich denn rufe und ihr weigert euch	RISM 450004737, RISM lit30029501	Frankfurt Ff 1453	SATB, 2 Ob, 2 Vl, Va, Vc, Bc	
3rd Sunday after Trinity	TWV 1:181	Das ist je gewisslich wahr	RISM 450003795	Frankfurt Ff 826	SATB, 2 Ob, 2 Vl, Va, Vc, Bc	
4th Sunday after Trinity	TWV 1:1384	So spricht der Herr Zebaoth: richte recht	RISM 450004673	Frankfurt Ff 1388	SATB, 2 Ob, 2 Vl, Va, Vc, Bc	
5th Sunday after Trinity	TWV 1:515	Es ist umsonst, dass ihr früh aufsteht	RISM 450004276, RISM 240000186	Frankfurt Ff 993	SATB, 2 Ob, Fg, 2 Vl, Va, Vc, Cb, Bc	
6th Sunday after Trinity	TWV 1:1046	Liebet eure Feinde, segnet	RISM 450004522, RISM 240000211	Frankfurt Ff 1238	SATB, 2 Ob, 2 Vl, Va, Vc, Bc	
7th Sunday after Trinity	TWV 1:1505	Was betrübst du dich, meine Seele	RISM 450004723, RISM lit30028216	Frankfurt Ff 1439	SATB, 2 Ob, 2 Vl, Va, Vc, Bc	
8th Sunday after Trinity	TWV 1:1262	Sehet nun zu, wie ihr fürsichtiglich wandelt	RISM 450004611	Frankfurt Ff 1325	SATB, 2 Ob, 2 Vl, Va, Cb, Bc	
9th Sunday after Trinity	TWV 1:1513	Was hast du, Mensch, was du nicht empfangen hast	RISM 450004726	Frankfurt Ff 1442	SATB, 2 Ob, 2 Vl, Va, Vc, Bc	
10th Sunday after Trinity	TWV 1:1429	Und als er nahe hinzu kam	RISM 450004690	Frankfurt Ff 1406	SATB, 2 Ob, 2 Vl, Va, Vc, Bc	
11th Sunday after Trinity	TWV 1:769	Herr, sei mir gnädig, denn mir ist angst	RISM 450004402, RISM 240000199, RISM lit30028215	Frankfurt Ff 1119	SATB, Qfl, 2 Ob, 2 Vl, Va, Vc, Cb, Bc	
12th Sunday after Trinity	TWV 1:817	Ich bin der Herr, dein Arzt	RISM 450004427	Frankfurt Ff 1144	SATB, 2 Ob, 2 Vl, Va, Vc, Bc	
13th Sunday after Trinity	TWV 1:403	Du sollst lieben Gott deinen Herrn	RISM 450004474	Frankfurt Ff 937	SATB, 2 Ob, 2 Vl, Va, Vc, Bc	
14th Sunday after Trinity	TWV 1:885	Ich will dich erhöhen	RISM 450004458, RISM 210000074, RISM 210000073	Frankfurt Ff 1176, Dresden Mus.2392-E-607, Dresden Mus.2392-E-607a	SATB, 2 Ob, 2 Cl, 2 Vl, Va, Vc, Bc	
15th Sunday after Trinity	TWV 1:1514	Was hat das Licht vor Gemeinschaft mit	RISM 450004727	Frankfurt Ff 1443	SATB, 2 Ob, 2 Vl, Va, Vc, Bc	
16th Sunday after Trinity	TWV 1:1616	Wie der Hirsch schreiet nach frischem Wasser	RISM 450004777, RISM 469057500, RISM lit30027547	Frankfurt Ff 1493	SATB, 2 Ob, 2 Vl, Va, Cb, Bc	
17th Sunday after Trinity	TWV 1:716	Haltet fest an der Demut	RISM 450004376	Frankfurt Ff 1093	SATB, 2 Ob, 2 Vl, Va, Vc, Bc	
18th Sunday after Trinity	TWV 1:1575	Wer da saget, ich kenne ihn	RISM 450004752, RISM 240000233	Frankfurt Ff 1468	SATB, 2 Ob, 2 Vl, Va, Vc, Bc	
19th Sunday after Trinity	TWV 1:495	Es ist das Herz ein trotzig und verzagt Ding	RISM 450004263	Frankfurt Ff 980	SATB, 2 Ob, 2 Vl, Va, Vc, Bc	
20th Sunday after Trinity	TWV 1:1367	So leget nun ab von euch	RISM 450004667	Frankfurt Ff 1381	SATB, 2 Ob, 2 Vl, Va, Vc, Cb, Bc	
21st Sunday after Trinity	TWV 1:1128	Mein Kind, verwirf die Zucht des Herrn nicht	RISM 450004545	Frankfurt Ff 1261	SASATB, 2 Ob, 2 Vl, Va, Vc, BcTB	
22nd Sunday after Trinity	TWV 1:1114	Mein Gott, ich schäme mich	RISM 450004541	Frankfurt Ff 1257	SATB, 2 Ob, 2 Vl, Va, Vc, Bc	
23rd Sunday after Trinity	TWV 1:251	Der Gottlose ist wie ein Wetter	RISM 450003836, RISM 210000020, RISM 210000021, RISM 452513235	Frankfurt Ff 869, Dresden Mus.2392-E-576, Dresden Mus.2392-E-576a	SATB, 2 Ob, Fg, 2 Vl, Va, Vc, Bc	
24th Sunday after Trinity	TWV 1:1298	Selig sind die Toten	RISM 450004633, RISM 469062300, RISM 240000221	Frankfurt Ff 1347	SATB, 2 Ob, 2 Vl, Va, Cb, Bc	
25th Sunday after Trinity	TWV 1:799	Hilf Herr, die Heiligen haben abgenommen	RISM 450004416	Frankfurt Ff 1133	SATB, 2 Ob, 2 Vl, Va, Vc, Cb, Bc	
26th Sunday after Trinity	TWV 1:537	Es wird des Herrn Tag kommen	RISM 450004292	Frankfurt Ff 1008	SATB, 2 Ob, 2 Vl, Va, Vc, Bc	
St. John's Day	TWV 1:197	Das weiß ich fürwahr, wer Gott dienet	RISM 450003802, RISM 806042573, RISM lit41001801	Frankfurt Ff 834	SATB, 2 Ob, 2 Vl, Va, Vc Bc	
Visitation	TWV 1:1754	Meine Seele erhebt den Herrn	RISM 450004555, RISM 806042572	Frankfurt Ff 1270	SATB, 2 Ob, 2 Vl, Va, Vc, Bc	
Michaelmas	TWV 1:1434	Und es erhub sich ein Streit im Himmel	RISM 452513207, RISM lit30029340		SATB, 2 Cl, Ti, 2 Vl, Va, Vc, Bc	

== Continuation of the cycle in 1719–1720 ==
Feast Day	TWV Number	Title	Librettist	RISM	Sources	Scoring	Notes
4th Sunday after Epiphany	TWV 1:362	Die, so ihr den Herrn fürchtet	Erdmann Neumeister	RISM 450003887, RISM lit30022937	Frankfurt Ff 920	SATB, 2 Ob, 2 Vl, Va, Vc, Bc	
5th Sunday after Epiphany	TWV 1:1273	Seid nüchtern und wachet	Erdmann Neumeister	RISM 450004620	Frankfurt Ff 1334	SATB, 2 Ob, Va, Vc, Bc	
6th Sunday after Epiphany	TWV 1:1448	Unser Wandel aber ist im Himmel	Erdmann Neumeister	****	MISSING	****	
Trinity	TWV 1:726	Heilig ist der Herr Zebaoth	Erdmann Neumeister	RISM 450004379, RISM 450004378	Frankfurt Ff 1095, Frankfurt Ff 1074	SATB, 2 Ob, 2 Tr, Ti, 2 Vl, Va, Vc, Bc	
1st Sunday after Trinity	TWV 1:246	Der Gerechte muss viel leiden	Erdmann Neumeister	RISM 450003833, RISM 469067800	Frankfurt Ff 866	SATB, 2 Ob, 2 Vl, Va, Vc, Bc	
2nd Sunday after Trinity	TWV 1:1008	Kommt her zu mit alle, die	Erdmann Neumeister	RISM 450004507	Frankfurt Ff 1223	SATB, 2 Ob, 2 Vl, Va, Vc, Bc	
3rd Sunday after Trinity	TWV 1:182	Das ist je gewisslich wahr	Erdmann Neumeister	RISM 450003793, RISM 469049800	Frankfurt Ff 825	SATB, 2 Ob, 2 Vl, Va, Vc, Bc	
4th Sunday after Trinity	TWV 1:386	Dünke dich nicht weise sein	Erdmann Neumeister	RISM 450004224, RISM 469049900	Frankfurt Ff 941	SATB, 2 Vl, Vla, Vlc, 2 Ob, Org, calcedon	
5th Sunday after Trinity	TWV 1:1753	Es ist umsonst, dass ihr früh aufsteht	Erdmann Neumeister	RISM 450004277, RISM 469050000, RISM lit30022943	Frankfurt Ff 994	SATB, 2 Ob, Fg, 2 Vl, Va, Vc, Cb, Bc	
6th Sunday after Trinity	TWV 1:781	Herr, wir liegen vor dir mit unserem Gebet	Erdmann Neumeister	RISM 450004410, RISM 469050100	Frankfurt Ff 1127	SATB, Qfl, 2 Vl, Va, Vc, Bc	
7th Sunday after Trinity	TWV 1:66	Aller Augen warten auf dich	Erdmann Neumeister	RISM 450003733, RISM 469050200	Frankfurt Ff 764	SATB, 2 Ob, Fg, 2 Vl, Va, Vc, Bc	
8th Sunday after Trinity	TWV 1:1551	Wende meine Augen ab	Erdmann Neumeister	RISM 450004741, RISM 469047900	Frankfurt Ff 1457	SATB, 2 Ob, 2 Vl, Va, Vc, Bc	
9th Sunday after Trinity	TWV 1:1669	Wir müssen alle offenbar werden	Erdmann Neumeister	RISM 450004797, RISM 469048000	Frankfurt Ff 1513	SATB, 2 Ob, 2 Vl, Va, Vc, Bc	
10th Sunday after Trinity	TWV 1:1203	O Land, höre des Herrn Wort	Erdmann Neumeister	RISM 450004583, RISM 469048100, RISM 469055200	Frankfurt Ff 1298	SATB, Fl, 2 Ob, 2 Vl, Va, Vc, Bc	
11th Sunday after Trinity	TWV 1:681	Gott sei mit gnädig	Erdmann Neumeister	RISM 450004355, RISM 464111015, RISM 469048200	Frankfurt Ff 1071, Berlin Mus.ms.autogr. Telemann, G. P. 30, Berlin SA 482	SATB, 2 Ob, 2 Vl, Va, Vc, Bc	
12th Sunday after Trinity	TWV 1:223	Dennoch bleibe ich stets an dir	Erdmann Neumeister	RISM 450003824, RISM 469048300	Frankfurt Ff 856, Berlin SA 483	SATB, 2 Ob, 2 Vl, Va, Vc, Bc	
13th Sunday after Trinity	TWV 1:929	In Christo Jesu gilt weder Beschneidung	Erdmann Neumeister	RISM 450004490, RISM 469048400	Frankfurt Ff 1208	SATB, 2 Ob, 2 Vl, Va, Vc, Bc	
14th Sunday after Trinity	TWV 1:215	Dein Schade ist verzweifelt böse	Erdmann Neumeister	RISM 450003811, RISM 469054200	Frankfurt Ff 843	SATB, Ob, 2 Vl, Va, Vc, Bc	
15th Sunday after Trinity	TWV 1:502	Es ist ein großer Gewinn	unknown	RISM 450004270, RISM 469054300	Frankfurt Ff 987	SATB, 2 Ob, 2 Vl, Va, Vc, Bc	
16th Sunday after Trinity	TWV 1:763	Herr, lehre uns bedenken	Georg Philipp Telemann	RISM 450004399, RISM 469054400	Frankfurt Ff 1116	SATB, 2 Ob, 2 Vl, Va, Vc, Bc	
17th Sunday after Trinity	TWV 1:1028	Lasset uns nicht eitler Ehre geizig sein	unknown	RISM 450004515, RISM 469054500	Frankfurt Ff 1231	SATB, 2 Ob, 2 Fg, 2 Vl, Va, Vc, Bc	
18th Sunday after Trinity	TWV 1:177	Das ist das ewige Leben	Georg Philipp Telemann	RISM 450003790, RISM 469054600	Frankfurt Ff 822	SATB, 2 Ob, 2 Vl, Va, Vc, Bc	
19th Sunday after Trinity	TWV 1:684	Gott straft den kranken Menschen	Georg Philipp Telemann	RISM 450004356, RISM 469054700	Frankfurt Ff 1072	SATB, 2 Ob, 2 Vl, Va, Vc, Bc	
20th Sunday after Trinity	TWV 1:888	Ich will mich mit dir verloben	unknown	RISM 450004460, RISM 469052300	Frankfurt Ff 1178	SATB, 2 Fl/Ob, 2 Vl, Va, Vc, Bc	
21st Sunday after Trinity	TWV 1:220	Denen, die Gott lieben	Georg Philipp Telemann	RISM 450003820, RISM 464141437, RISM 469052400	Frankfurt Ff 852, Berlin N.Mus.ms. 490	SATB, 2 Ob 2 Vl, Va, Vc, Bc	
22nd Sunday after Trinity	TWV 1:382	Du bist erschrecklich	Georg Philipp Telemann	RISM 450004218, RISM 469052500	Frankfurt Ff 934	SATB, 2 Ob, 2 Vl, Va, Vc, Bc	
23rd Sunday after Trinity	TWV 1:1360	So ihr die Person ansehet	unknown	****	MISSING	****	
24th Sunday after Trinity	TWV 1:1082	Man muss nicht zu seht trauern	Georg Philipp Telemann	RISM 450004537, RISM 469052600	Frankfurt Ff 1253	SATB, 2 Ob, 2 Vl, Va, Vc, Bc	
25th Sunday after Trinity	TWV 1:1247	Schicket euch in die Zeit	Gottfried Simonis	RISM 450004605	Frankfurt Ff 1319	SATB, 2 Ob, 2 Ch, 2 Vl, Va, Vc, Bc	
26th Sunday after Trinity	TWV 1:918	Ihr sollt geschickt sein	unknown	RISM 450004485, RISM 469052700	Frankfurt Ff 1203	SATB, 2 Ob, 2 Vl, Va, Vc, Bc	
27th Sunday after Trinity	TWV 1:1381	So seid nun wacker allezeit	Gottfried Simonis	****	MISSING	****	
St. John's Day	TWV 1:772	Herr, tue meine Lippen auf		****	MISSING	****	
Visitation	TWV 1:1104	Meine Seele erhebt den Herrn	Gottfried Simonis	****	MISSING	SATB, 2 Ob, 2 Vl, Va, Vc, Bc	Repetition from 1717
Michaelmas	TWV 1:233	Der Engel des Herrn lagert sich		****	MISSING	****	

== Continuation in Neumeister's 1726 textbook ==
Feast Day	TWV Number	Title
4th Sunday after Epiphany	TWV 1:362	Die, so ihr den Herrn fürchtet
5th Sunday after Epiphany	TWV 1:1273	Seid nüchtern und wachet
6th Sunday after Epiphany	TWV 1:1448	Unser Wandel aber ist im Himmel
Trinity	TWV 1:726	Heilig ist der Herr Zebaoth
1st Sunday after Trinity	TWV 1:246	Der Gerechte muss viel leiden
2nd Sunday after Trinity	TWV 1:1008	Kommt her zu mit alle, die
3rd Sunday after Trinity	TWV 1:182	Das ist je gewisslich wahr
4th Sunday after Trinity	TWV 1:386	Dünke dich nicht weise sein
5th Sunday after Trinity	TWV 1:1753	Es ist umsonst, dass ihr früh aufsteht
6th Sunday after Trinity	TWV 1:781	Herr, wir liegen vor dir mit unserem Gebet
7th Sunday after Trinity	TWV 1:66	Aller Augen warten auf dich
8th Sunday after Trinity	TWV 1:1551	Wende meine Augen ab
9th Sunday after Trinity	TWV 1:1669	Wir müssen alle offenbar werden
10th Sunday after Trinity	TWV 1:1203	O Land, höre des Herrn Wort
11th Sunday after Trinity	TWV 1:681	Gott sei mit gnädig
12th Sunday after Trinity	TWV 1:223	Dennoch bleibe ich stets an dir
13th Sunday after Trinity	TWV 1:929	In Christo Jesu gilt weder Beschneidung
14th Sunday after Trinity	TWV 1:215	Dein Schade ist verzweifelt böse
15th Sunday after Trinity	not composed	Trachtet am ersten nach dem Reiche Gottes
16th Sunday after Trinity	not composed	Wer weiß, wie nahe mir mein Ende?
17th Sunday after Trinity	not composed	Wer sich selbst erhöhet, der soll erniedrget werden
18th Sunday after Trinity	not composed	Was mir Gewinn war
19th Sunday after Trinity	not composed	Da nun Jesus ihren Glauben sahe
20th Sunday after Trinity	1:888	Ich will mich mit dir verloben
21st Sunday after Trinity	not composed	Des Herrn Wort ist wahrhaftig
22nd Sunday after Trinity	not composed	Also wird euch mein himmlischer Vater auch tun
23rd Sunday after Trinity	not composed	Ach Herr, wie ist meiner Feinde so viel
24th Sunday after Trinity	not composed	Herr mein Gott, da ich schrie zu dir
25th Sunday after Trinity	not composed	Ich will dich zur Wüste und zur Schmach
26th Sunday after Trinity	not composed	Es ist gewisslich an der Zeit
27th Sunday after Trinity	not composed	Danket dem Herrn, denn er ist freundlich
St. John's Day	1:772	Herr, tue meine Lippen auf
Visitation	?	Meine Seele erhebet den Herrn
Michaelmas	not composed	Der Engel des Herrn lagert sich um die her

== Recording ==
The cantata for the Second Sunday in Lent from this cycle, Ich hatte viel Bekümmernis TWV 1:843 can be heard on:

- Telemann: Cantatas – (Veronika Winter, Lena Susanne Norin, Jan Kobow, Ekkehard Abele; Rheinische Kantorei; Das Kleine Konzert; conductor: Hermann Max). CPO 7771952.

Set to a poem by Erdmann Neumeister, Ich hatte viel Bekümmernis tells a story from the Gospel of St.Mark in which a woman asks Jesus to heal her daughter who is possessed by the devil.
