= Patricia Barber =

American singer, pianist, and songwriter

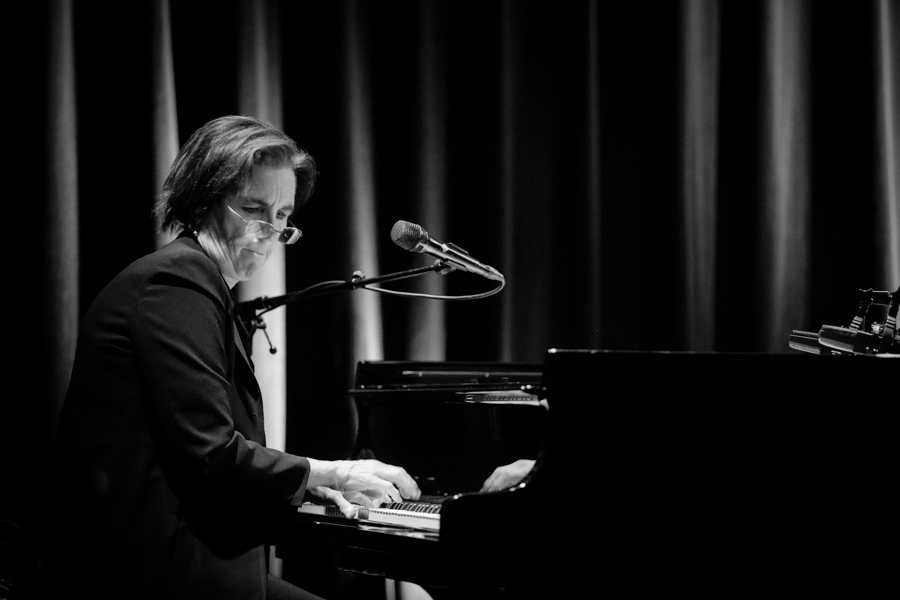

Background information
- Born: November 8, 1955 (age 70); Chicago, Illinois, U.S.
- Genres: Jazz
- Occupations: Songwriter, jazz singer, pianist, composer
- Instruments: Voice, piano
- Years active: 1989-present
- Labels: ArtistShare, Blue Note, Premonition, Concord, Impex, Floyd, Antilles
- Website: Official site

Patricia Barber (born November 8, 1955) is an American songwriter, composer, singer, and pianist.

== Biography ==
Barber's father Floyd was a jazz saxophonist who played with Bud Freeman and Glenn Miller. She played saxophone and piano from a young age, sang in musicals in high school, and studied piano at the University of Iowa in the early 1970s. From there Barber went to Chicago and began performing regularly in bars and clubs. She won a Guggenheim Fellowship in music composition in March 2003, an unusual accomplishment for someone working in the field of popular songwriting. The Guggenheim allowed her to devote time to a song cycle based on Ovid's Metamorphoses. She is married to musicologist Martha Feldman.

== Awards and honors ==
- She was given a Guggenheim Fellowship in 2003 in the field of Creative Arts – Music Composition.
- She was elected to the American Academy of Arts and Sciences in 2019.

== Discography ==
An asterisk (*) indicates that the year is that of release.

Year recorded	Title	Label	Personnel/Notes
1989*	Split	Floyd	Trio, with Michael Arnopol (bass), Mark Walker (drums)
1991	A Distortion of Love	Antilles	With Wolfgang Muthspiel (guitar), Marc Johnson (bass), Adam Nussbaum (drums, percussion, finger snaps), Carla White and Big Kahuna (finger snaps)
1994	Café Blue	Premonition	With John McLean (guitar), Michael Arnopol (bass), Mark Walker (drums, percussion)
1998	Modern Cool	Premonition	With John McLean (guitar), Michael Arnopol (bass), Mark Walker (drums, percussion), Dave Douglas (trumpet), Jeff Stitely (udu), Choral Thunder Vocal Choir
1999	Companion	Premonition	With John McLean (guitar), Michael Arnopol (bass), Eric Montzka (drums, percussion), Ruben P. Alvarez (percussion); Jason Narducy (vocals) added on one track
2000*	Nightclub	Premonition/Blue Note	With Marc Johnson and Michael Arnopol (bass; separately), Adam Nussbaum and Adam Cruz (drums; separately), Charlie Hunter (guitar)
2002*	Verse	Premonition/Blue Note	Most tracks quartet, with Dave Douglas (trumpet), Neal Alger (guitar), Michael Arnopol (bass), Joey Baron (drums); one track quartet with Eric Montzka (drums) replacing Baron; one track with Cliff Colnot String Ensemble added
2004*	Live: A Fortnight in France	Blue Note	Quartet, with Neal Alger (guitar), Michael Arnapol (bass), Eric Montzka (drums)
2006*	Mythologies	Blue Note	Most tracks quartet, with Neal Alger (guitar), Michael Arnapol (bass), Eric Montzka (drums); some tracks with Jim Gailloreto (sax) added; some tracks with various vocalists added
2008*	The Cole Porter Mix	Blue Note	Most tracks quartet, with Neal Alger (guitar), Michael Arnopol (bass), Eric Montzka (drums, percussion); some tracks quintet, with Chris Potter (tenor sax) added; some tracks quartet with Alger (guitar), Arnopol (bass), Nate Smith (drums, percussion)
2010	Live in Concert	Floyd	Duo, with Kenny Werner (piano); in concert
2013*	Smash	Concord Jazz	
2019	Higher	ArtistShare	Recording of song cycle "Angels, Birds and I…"
2021	Clique	Impex Records	A product of the same recording sessions as her 2019 album Higher.
