= Vladimir Fédorov =

French musicologist, librarian, and composer

- Владимир Михайлович Фёдоров
- Born: August 5, 1901; Chernihiv, Russian Empire (present-day Ukraine)
- Died: April 9, 1979 (aged 77); Paris, France
- Occupations: Musicologist; Librarian; Composer

Vladimir Fédorov (Note: Russian: Владимир Михайлович Фёдоров, romanized: Vladimir Mikhaylovich Fyodorov) (5 August 1901 – 9 April 1979) was a musicologist, librarian, and composer. He studied with André Pirro at the Schola Cantorum de Paris and studied composition privately with Paul Vidal. He was president of the International Association of Music Libraries (IAML) from 1962 until 1965 and from 1968 until 1971.

The Vladimir Fédorov Award is named in his honor, awarded annually by IAML for the best article published in Fontes artis musicae, of which Fédorov was editor-in-chief.

== Writings ==
- "Sur un manuscrit de Moussorgskii: les différentes éditions de ses Lieder", RdM, xiii (1932), 10–23
- "Les années d'apprentissage de Moussorgsky", ReM, nos.137–40 (1933), 196–204
- Moussorgsky: biographie critique (Paris, 1935)
- "Le théâtre lyrique en URSS", Polyphonie, i (1947–8), 78–83
- "Paroles dites, paroles chantées", Polyphonie, ii (1948), 73–80
- "Notes sur la musicologie médiévale", Polyphonie, iii (1949), 30–37
- "Peut-on parler d'une école bourguignonne de musique au XVe siècle?", Les cahiers techniques de l'art, ii (1949), 29–36
- "Bach en France", Revue internationale de musique, no.8 (1950), 165–71
- "André Pirro (1869–1943) und Yvonne Rokseth (1890–1948)", Mf, iii (1950), 106–19
- "Interférences", "Rossica", Musique Russe, ed. P. Souvtchinsky (Paris, 1953), i, 27–44; ii, 397–405
- "Le voyage de M.I. Glinka en Italie", CHM, ii (1956–7), 179–92
- "Correspondance inédite de P.I. Čajkovskij avec son éditeur français", RdM, xxxix–xl (1957), 61–70
- "Musicien russe ou compositeur européen? (A.K. Glazunov)", RdM, xli (1958), 60–72
- ed., with F. Michel and F. Lesure: Encyclopédie de la musique, Fasquelle (1958–61)
- "Michail Ivanovic Glinka en Espagne", Miscelánea en homenaje a Monseñor Higinio Anglés (Barcelona, 1958–61), 223–37
- "A propos de quelques lettres de Santini à Bottée de Toulmon", Festschrift Karl Gustav Fellerer to his 60th birthday, ed. H. Hüschen (Regensburg, 1962), 128–36
- "Debussy vu par quelques Russes", Debussy et l'évolution de la musique au XXe siècle: Paris 1962, 199–209
- "Des Russes au Concile de Florence, 1438–39", Hans Albrecht in memoriam, ed. W. Brennecke and H. Haase (Kassel, 1962), 27–33
- "V.V. Stasov chez l'abbé F. Santini", Anthony van Hoboken: Festschrift, ed. J. Schmidt-Görg (Mainz, 1962), 55–62
- "Lettres de quelques voyageurs russes au XVIIIe siècle", Festschrift Friedrich Blume, ed. A.A. Abert and W. Pfannkuch (Kassel, 1963), 112–23
- "Serge Prokofiev", Histoire de la musique, ii, ed. Roland-Manuel (Paris, 1963), 1023–35
- "Les années d'apprentissage de Rameau", Chigiana, new ser., i (1964), 19–28
- "Čajkovskij et la France (à propos de quelques lettres de Čajkovskij à Félix Makar)", RdM, liv (1968), 16–95
- "De la bibliothèque et des bibliothécaires: hier et aujourd'hui", Quellenstudien zur Musik: for Wolfgang Schmieder's 70th birthday, ed. K. Dorfmüller and G. von Dadelsen (Frankfurt, 1972), 19–27
