= RIPM Jazz Periodicals =

Searchable database of jazz periodicals

RIPM Jazz Periodicals is a searchable database of full-text, mostly out-of-print, rare jazz periodicals, published by Répertoire international de la presse musicale (Retrospective Index to Music Periodicals), commonly known as RIPM. Updated annually with new full-text journals including full citations, RIPM Jazz Periodicals currently contains 119 American (U.S.) jazz journals and magazines published from 1914 to 2010. A full list of titles, including publication information and sample journal covers, is available on the RIPM Jazz gallery page.

== Background ==
RIPM Jazz Periodicals was developed to preserve and provide access to the historic jazz periodical literature in order to facilitate the study of jazz history and to address a number of longstanding issues that rendered this large body of literature unavailable: (i) most jazz journals and magazines are out-of-print, in poor physical condition, and/or found in very few libraries; (ii) the lack of complete runs; (iii) the difficulty encountered when one attempts to locate specific information within an available source; and, (iv) the difficulty distinguishing those publications that are significant from those of lesser interest, aside from a handful of recognized titles.

== Collaborators ==
In 2014 RIPM and the Institute of Jazz Studies (IJS) at Rutgers University-Newark signed an agreement to collaborate on the creation of RIPM Jazz Periodicals. In addition, through RIPM’s Partner and Participating Library Program, RIPM gained access to journals in a number of other collections including those of the Library of Congress, Yale University, the University of North Texas, the University of Illinois-Urbana Champaign, Oberlin College, and the Peabody Institute of the Johns Hopkins University—all holding material that complements the IJS collection.
