= Geneviève Thibault de Chambure =

French musicologist (1902–1975)

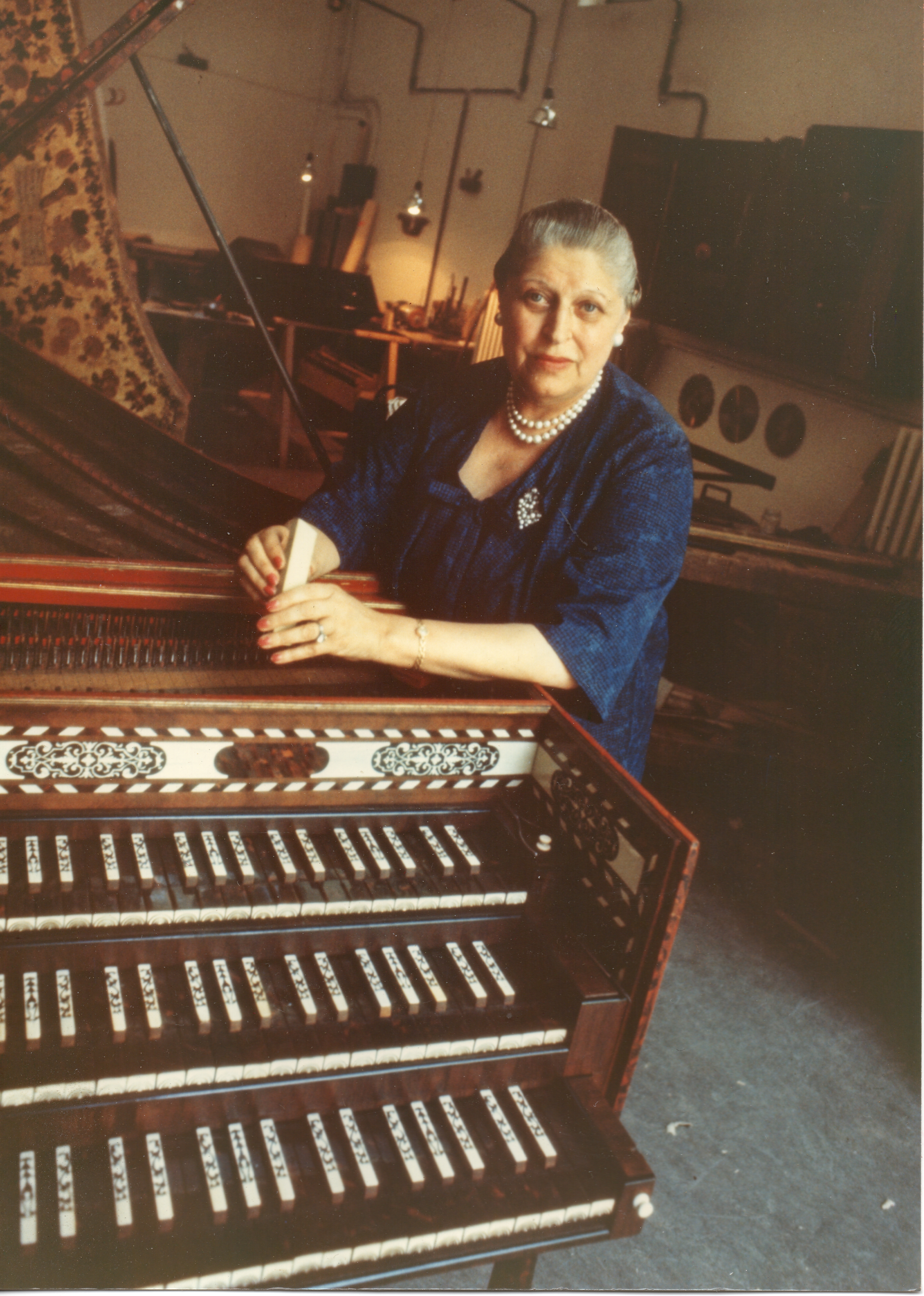
Thibault in 1940

Geneviève, comtesse Hubert de Chambure Thibault (20 June 1902, Neuilly-sur-Seine – 31 August 1975, Strasbourg) was a French musicologist associated with the revival of interest in early music.

== Life and career ==
She graduated from the Sorbonne in 1920 with a thesis on John Dowland, and then continued the work with André Pirro on her doctoral thesis on the fifteenth-century chanson, which she never completed. In 1925 co-founded the Société de musique d'autrefois, designed to promote the publication de musical texts (from 1954) and a magazine les Annales musicologiques (from 1955). After her marriage in 1931 she stopped musical and scholarly activities, gave birth to six children, and alternated her life between Vietnam and France. After the death of her husband Hubert Pelletier de Chambure (1903-1953), she returned permanently to Paris, where in June 1953 she resumed her scholarly activities and organization of concerts. From 1961 to 1973, she was curator of the historical instrumentals of the Conservatoire de Paris - in addition to having amassed her own private collection. She was an important muse and teacher to the first generation of baroque specialists, including young Americans in Paris - William Christie (harpsichordist) and soprano Judith Nelson.

In 1967 she founded the Laboratoire d'organologie et d'iconographie musicale at the CNRS. When the American musicologist Barry S. Brook started conceiving in 1969 the international project for research of visual sources for music and the systematic cataloguing of music iconography represented in artworks, Mme de Chambure was his key advisor and when the project was officially founded in August 1971 in St. Gall, she became with him and Harald Heckmann co-president of the Répertoire International d'Iconographie Musicale (RIdIM). Her Laboratoire d'organologie et d'iconographie musicale, which was the first national center for the research of music iconography, became affiliated with RIdIM as its French national center.

Geneviève Thibault de Chambure has been president of the French association of musicologists Société française de musicologie (1967-1970).

== Works ==
(chronological order)

- Eugénie Droz et Geneviève Thibault, Poètes et musiciens du XVe siècle. Paris, impr. G. Jeanbin, 1924 (12 March 1925). 2°, 87 p. (Documents artistiques du XVe siècle, 1). Reprint: Slatkine, 1976.
- Geneviève Thibault, Quelques chansons de Dufay, in Revue de musicologie (August 1924), p. 97-102.
- Geneviève Thibault, Un manuscrit de chansons françaises à la bibliothèque royale de La Haye, par G. Thibault, in Gedenkboek aangeboden aan Dr. D. F. Scheurleer ('s-Gravenhage : M. Nijhoff, [1925]), p. 347-358.
- Eugénie Droz et Geneviève Thibault, Un chansonnier de Philippe le Bon, in Revue de musicologie (February 1926), p. 1-8.
- Trois chansonniers français du XVe siècle [édités par Eugénie Droz, Yvonne Rokseth et Geneviève Thibault]. Fascicule I [Chansonnier de Dijon n° 517]. Paris : [E. Droz], 1927. 2°, XVIII-127 p. (Documents artistiques du XVe siècle, 4). Réédition : Slatkine, 1976.
- Geneviève Thibault et Eugénie Droz, Le Chansonnier de la bibliothèque royale de Copenhague, in Revue de musicologie 8/21 (1927) p. 12-35.
- Geneviève Thibault, Deux catalogues de libraires musicaux : Vincenti et Gardane (Venise 1591), in Revue de musicologie 10/32 (1929) p. 177-183 et 11/30 (1930), p. 7-18.
- Geneviève Thibault, Les Amours de P. de Ronsard, mises en musique par Jehan de Maletty (1578), in Mélanges de musicologie offerts à M. Lionel de La Laurencie (Paris, : 1933), p. 61-72.
- Chansons au luth et airs de cour français du XVIe siècle, intr. by Lionel de La Laurencie, transcr. par Adrienne Mairy, commentaire et étude des sources par G. Thibault. Paris : E. Droz, 1934. (Publications de la Société française de musicologie).
- Geneviève Thibault, Yvonne Rokseth [obituary], in Revue de musicologie 30 (1948), n° 85-88, p. 76-90. Suivi de la bibliographie de son œuvre par François Lesure.
- Geneviève Thibault, Antoine de Bertrand, musicien de Ronsard et ses amis toulousains, in Mélanges offerts à M. Abel Lefranc (Paris : Droz, 1936), p. 282-300.
- Geneviève Thibault et Louis Perceau, Bibliographie des poésies de Ronsard mises en musique au XVIe siècle. Paris : Société française de Musicologie, 1941.
- Chansonnier de Jean de Montchenu : Bibliothèque nationale, Rothschild 2973 (I.5.13), édition de G. Thibault; commentaires de David Fallows. Paris : Société française de musicologie, 1952. Partition, CXXIII-87 p., ill. (Publications de la Société française de musicologie, Ie série, 23). Reprinted in 1991.
- Thèse sur la Chanson française et la musique instrumentale de 1450 à 1550 (with André Pirro).
- François Lesure and Geneviève Thibault. Bibliographie des éditions musicales publiées par Nicolas Du Chemin (1549-1576). In Annales musicologiques 1 (1953) p. 269-373 + suppl.
- Geneviève Thibault, Musique et poésie en France au XVIe siècle avant les "Amours" de Ronsard, in Musique et poésie au XVIe siècle, Paris, 30 juin-4 juillet 1953 (Paris : Éditions du CNRS, 1954), p. 79-88.
- François Lesure and Geneviève Thibault. Bibliographie des éditions d'Adrian Le Roy et Robert Ballard (1551-1598). Paris : Société française de musicologie, 1955.
- Geneviève Thibault, Le Concert instrumental dans l'art flamand au XVe siècle et au début du XVIe s., in La Renaissance dans les provinces du Nord..., Paris, 1956 (Paris : Éditions du CNRS, 1956), p. 197-206.
- Geneviève Thibault, Notes sur quelques chansons normandes du manuscrit de Bayeux, in La Musique et les musiciens en Normandie. Mélanges du XIIe du XVIIe siècle... éd. Norbert Dufourcq (Rouen : Association d'études normandes, 1957) p. 4-6.
- Geneviève Thibault, Le XVe siècle, in Précis de musicologie... published under the direction of Jacques Chailley... (Paris : 1958), p. 152-190.
- Geneviève Thibault, Un manuscrit italien pour luth des premières années du XVIe siècle, in Le Luth et sa musique... (Paris: 1958), p. 43-76.
- Geneviève Thibault, La Musique instrumentale au XVIe siècle : Italie, Allemagne, France, in Encyclopédie de la Pléiade, 9 : Histoire de la musique, sous la direction de Roland-Manuel, vol I (Paris : Gallimard, 1960), p. 1196-1336.
- Geneviève Thibault, La Chanson française au XVe siècle, de Dufay à Josquin des Prés (1420 à 1480), in idem, p. 890-944.
- Geneviève Thibault, L'ornementation dans la musique profane au Moyen-âge, in International musicological society - Internationale Gesellschaft für Musikwissenschaft - Société internationale de musicologie. Report of the eighth congress, New York, 1961, edited by Jan Larue. Volume I (Kassel, etc. : Bärenreiter, 1961–1962), p. 166-171.
- Geneviève Thibault, Du rôle de l'ornementation, improvisée ou écrite, dans l'évolution de la musique, in idem, p. 166-171.
- Geneviève Thibault, Le "Te Deum" de Lalande : minutage de l'époque, in Association internationale des bibliothèques musicales... Septième congrès international des bibliothèques musicales, Dijon, 1st-6th July 1965. Actes du congrès..., (Kassel, [1966]), p. 162-165.
- Geneviève Thibault, Recherches effectuées au Musée instrumental du Conservatoire de Paris [avec des sonagrammes de flûtes à bec], in idem, p. 209-212.
- Geneviève Thibault, Note sur une édition inconnue de Clérambault, in Revue de musicologie 52 (1966), p. 210–211.
- François Lesure et Geneviève Thibault, La Méthode de mandoline de Michel Corrette (1772), in Fontes artis musicae, 1966/1 : Mélanges offerts à Vladimir Fedorov, p. 72-76.
- Preservation and restoration of musical instruments : provisional recommendations, ed. Alfred Berner, J. H. Van der Meer and Geneviève Thibault, with the coll. of Norman Brommelle. International Council of museums; London : Evelyn, Adams and Mackay, 1967. (Reports and papers on museums; 2).
- Geneviève Thibault, Un rapport français inédit sur l'Empire Ottoman en 1756, in Journal asiatique 258 (1970), pp. 319–370.
- Geneviève Thibault, Emblèmes et devises des Visconti dans les œuvres musicales du trecento, in L'Ars nova italiana del trecento : secondo convegno internazionale 17-22 Iuglio 1969 (Certaldo : Centro di Studi, 1970), p. 131-160.
- Geneviève Thibault, De la vogue des instruments à clavier anversois à Paris au XVIIIe siècle, in La Vie musicale à Anvers au siècle de Granvelle : [catalogue d'exposition], Musée Granvelle, Besançon, 1st to 30th September 1972, Hôtel de Sully, Paris, 9 October to 15 November 1972 (S.l. : s.n., 1972).
- Eighteenth century musical instruments, France and Britain = Les instruments de musique au XVIIIe siècle, France et Grande Bretagne [catalogue d'exposition : Londres, Victoria and Albert Museum; Paris; Lyon; Strasbourg...], éd. Geneviève Thibault, Jean Jenkins, Josiane Bran-Ricci. London : H.M.'s Stationery office, 1973.
- Geneviève Thibault, L'interprétation, sur les clavecins anciens, de la musique française des XVIIe et XVIIIe siècles, in L'interprétation de la musique française aux XVIIe et XVIIIe siècles. Colloque international, Paris, 20–26 October 1969. (Paris : CNRS, 1974), p. 197–202.
- Geneviève Thibault, Marc Pincherle (1888–1974) [obituary] [suivie par une bibliographie de ses travaux par Jean Gribenski], in Revue de musicologie 61/2 (1975) p. 169–196.
- Geneviève Thibault, Le Chansonnier Nivelle de la Chaussée, in Annales musicologiques : Moyen âge et Renaissance 7 (1964–1977), p. 11-16. [Ce dernier fascicule des Annales musicologiques était dédié À la mémoire de Geneviève Thibault (1902–1975), fondatrice de la Société de musique d'autrefois].

== Sources ==
=== On her life ===
- Georges Rivière et Josiane Bran-Ricci,Geneviève Thibault, comtesse Hubert de Chambure : une vie au service de la musique. Paris : Société des amis du musée instrumental du Conservatoire national supérieur de musique, 1981. 12 p.
- Nanie Bridgman, Geneviève Thibault, comtesse de Chambure (20 May 1902 – 31 August 1975) [obituary], in Revue de musicologie 62 (1976), p. 195-203.
- Tilman Seebass, De l'image à l'objet : la méthode critique en iconographie musicale : in memoriam Geneviève Thibault de Chambure (1902-1975), in Imago musicae 4 (1987). Contenu détaillé sur le site web de la Société française de musicologie.
- Catherine Massip and Florence Gétreau, Les collections Henry Prunières et Geneviève Thibault de Chambure : formation, composition, interaction, valorisation, in Collectionner la musique : histoires d'une passion, éd. Catherine Massip, Denis Herlin, Dinko Fabris et Jean Duron (Turnhout : Brepols, 2011), p. 217–256.

=== Catalogs of auctions and dations ===
- Musiques anciennes : instruments et partitions (XVIe–XVIIIe siècles) [catalogue de l'exposition à la Bibliothèque nationale [6 November - 6 December] 1980 organisée par la Bibliothèque nationale et le Musée instrumental du Conservatoire national supérieur de musique, rédigé par Josiane Bran-Ricci, Florence Abondance, Catherine Massip and François Lesure; preface by Jean-Philippe Lecat]. - Paris : Bibliothèque nationale, 1980. 107 p., ill.
- Bibliothèque musicale de la comtesse de Chambure : théorie musicale, arts du spectacle, danse, ballet, opéra : [1ère] vente, Paris, Nouveau Drouot, salles 5 et 6, 26 May 1993, commissaires-priseurs, Ader, Me.Tajan, Boisgirard et Loudmer. - Paris : P. Berès, 1993.
- Bibliothèque musicale de la comtesse de Chambure : deuxième vente : musique instrumentale, opéra, chants profanes, musique religieuse, cantates : vente aux enchères publiques le 5 avril 1995... Hôtel Drouot, salle 2, Paris. - Paris : Hôtel Drouot, 1995.
- Bibliothèque musicale de la comtesse de Chambure : troisième vente : manuscrits : musique religieuse, opéra, cantates, chants profanes, musique instrumentale : vente, Paris, Hôtel Drouot, salle 3, 31 janvier 1996, [commissaire-priseur, M. Rémi Ader]. - Paris : Hôtel Drouot, 1996.
- Bibliothèque musicale de la comtesse de Chambure : quatrième vente : musique instrumentale et vocale, opéras, ballets, danse, musique religieuse, cantates, motets, airs de cour, chansons profanes et bachiques [vente, Paris, Drouot-Richelieu, salle 12, 25 mars 1997, commissaire-priseur, Me. Rémi Ader]. - Paris : P. Berès, 1997.
- Rare printed and manuscript music including items from the collections of professor Franklin Zimmermann and Geneviève Thibault, comtesse de Chambure. - Great Barrington (MA) : J. & J. Lubrano, 1993. 54 p. : ill.
- Mobilier du château de L. : collection de la comtesse Hubert de Chambure : vente, Paris, Drouot-Richelieu, 4 juin 1997, commissaire-priseur, Me. François de Ricqlès. Paris : R. Millet, R. Lepic et A. Nazare-Aga; Marseille : T. Samuel-Weiss, 1997. 73 p., ill.
