= Répertoire International des Sources Musicales =

Music cataloging organisation based in Germany

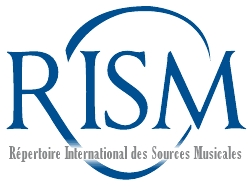
- Purpose: To locate and document extant musical sources worldwide
- Headquarters: Editorial Center in Frankfurt, Germany; Digital Center in Bern, Switzerland
- Location: Worldwide
- Origins: Robert Eitner
- Product: Database, books
- Method: Contributors in working groups around the world
- Key people: Dr. Balázs Mikusi, Director; Dr. Harald Heckmann, Prof. Dr. Dr. h.c. Christoph Wolff, Honorary Presidents; Prof. Dr. Klaus Pietschmann, President
- Employees: 6 at the Editorial Center, 7 at the Digital Center
- Website: rism.info, rism.digital

The Répertoire International des Sources Musicales (RISM, English International Inventory of Musical Sources, German Internationales Quellenlexikon der Musik) is an international non-profit organization, founded in Paris in 1952, with the aim of comprehensively documenting extant historical sources of music all over the world. It is the largest organization of its kind and the only entity operating globally to document written musical sources. RISM is one of the four bibliographic projects sponsored by the International Musicological Society and the International Association of Music Libraries, Archives and Documentation Centres, the others being Répertoire International de Littérature Musicale (RILM, founded in 1966), Répertoire International d'Iconographie Musicale (RIdIM, founded in 1971), and Répertoire international de la presse musicale (RIPM, founded in 1980).

Shortly after its founding, A.H. King called RISM, "one of the boldest pieces of long-term planning ever undertaken for the source material of any subject in the humanistic field."

The musical sources recorded are manuscripts or printed music, writings about music and libretti. They are stored in libraries, archives, churches, schools, and private collections. RISM establishes what exists and where it is kept. RISM is recognized among experts as the key place for documenting music sources all over the world.

The work of RISM in compiling a comprehensive index fulfills a twofold purpose: for one, music documents are protected from loss, and for another, they are made available to scholars and musicians.

== Organization ==
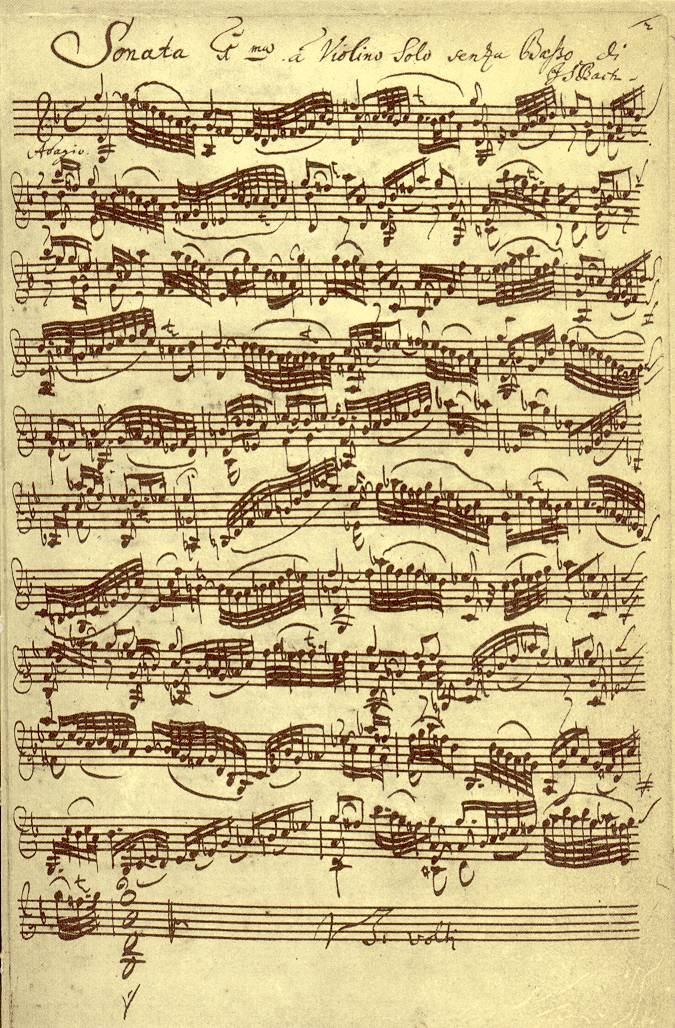
Example of an autograph music manuscript: Johann Sebastian Bach, Sonata for Violin Solo, BWV 1001, preserved at the Berlin State Library (RISM ID no. 467096700 )

One or several RISM working groups in more than 35 countries take part in the project. Around 100 individuals from those working groups catalog the musical sources preserved in their countries. They use a central database that is maintained by the RISM Editorial Center (Zentralredaktion) in Frankfurt am Main and the RISM Digital Center in Bern.

Musical sources in RISM publications and contributors in active RISM working groups include the following countries:

- Afghanistan
- Andorra
- Argentina
- Australia
- Austria
- Azerbaijan
- Belarus
- Belgium
- Brazil
- Bulgaria
- Canada
- China
- Colombia
- Croatia
- Czech Republic
- Denmark
- Egypt
- Estonia
- Finland
- France
- Germany
- Georgia
- Greece
- Guatemala
- Hong Kong
- Hungary
- Iceland
- India
- Indonesia
- Iran
- Ireland
- Israel
- Italy
- Japan
- Latvia
- Lebanon
- Lithuania
- Luxembourg
- Mexico
- Netherlands
- New Zealand
- Norway
- Pakistan
- Poland
- Portugal
- Romania
- Russia
- Saudi Arabia
- Slovakia
- Slovenia
- South Africa
- South Korea
- Spain
- Sweden
- Switzerland
- Taiwan
- Tajikistan
- Turkey
- Ukraine
- United Kingdom
- United States
- Uruguay
- Uzbekistan
- Vatican City
- Venezuela

The RISM Editorial Center and the working groups in Germany are projects funded by the Academy of Sciences and Literature in Mainz. The other working groups receive independent funding in their own countries.

=== RISM Digital Center ===
In 2021 the RISM Digital Center in Bern, Switzerland was created to maintain and expand the digital infrastructure for the global RISM community. The RISM Digital Center is primarily responsible for developing Muscat, the online cataloguing tool for the organization. The Digital Center is also responsible for developing RISM Online, Verovio, and building tools to manage and publish the RISM data.

== Publications ==
RISM's main focus is its electronic database containing descriptions of musical sources from around the world. In addition, RISM series, most of which have been published as books, divide sources into distinct groups.

=== RISM Database ===
The RISM database can be searched through two free online resources, the RISM Catalog and RISM Online. The RISM Catalog was released 2010 and is made possible through cooperation between RISM, the Bavarian State Library (Bayerische Staatsbibliothek), and the Berlin State Library (Staatsbibliothek zu Berlin). RISM Online was launched in 2021 by the RISM Digital Center in Switzerland.

Of the musical sources described in the database (1.6 million as of November 2026), most are music manuscripts, while there is also a substantial number of printed editions, and smaller quantities of libretti and treatises. The focus of music manuscripts is on material dating from between 1600 and 1850, though the database contains manuscripts that are both newer and older than this. For printed music, the focus is on music printed before 1945. The music of more than 37,000 composers preserved in over 900 libraries can be found in the database.

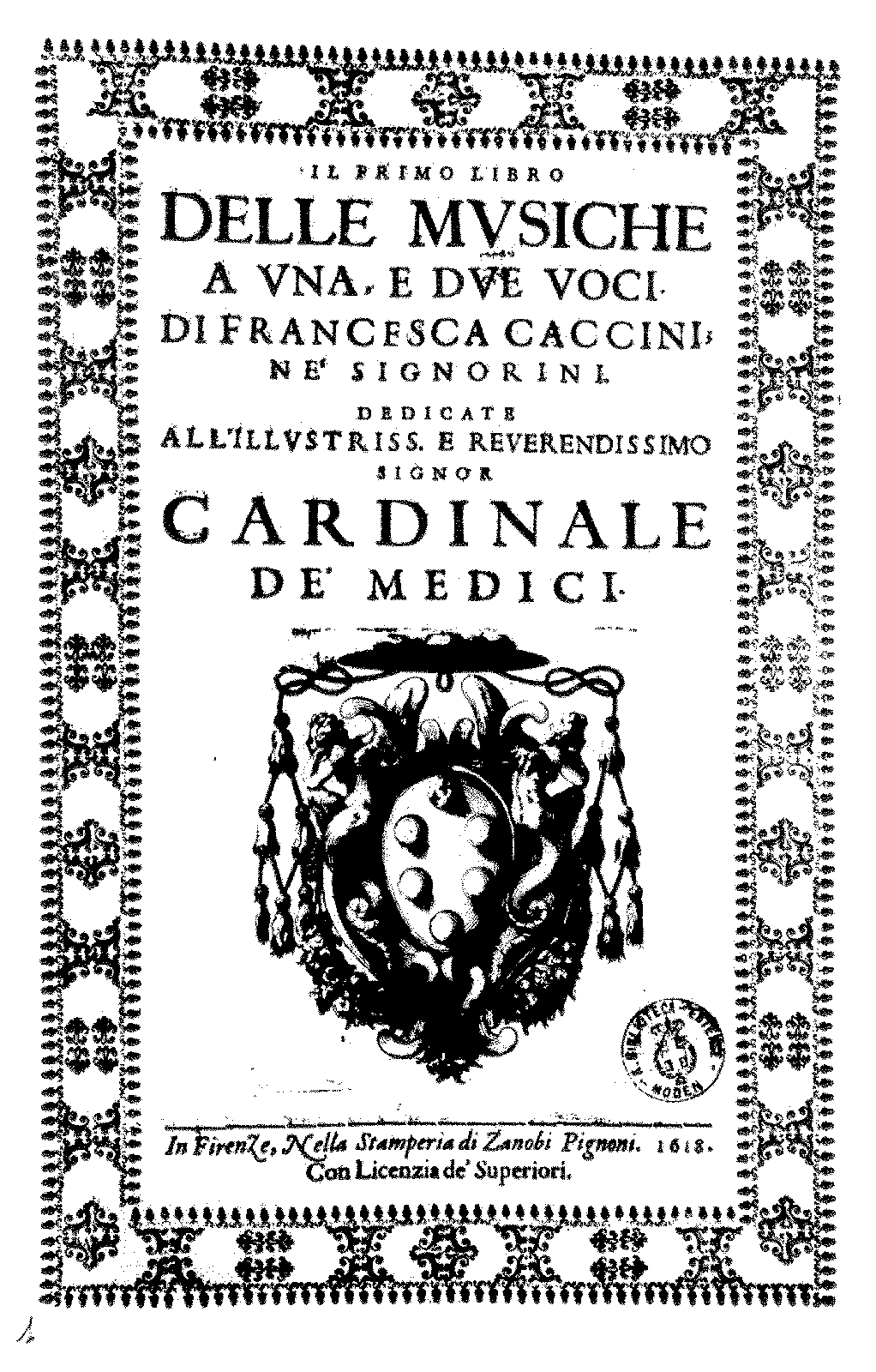
Francesca Caccini, "Primo Libro delle Musiche" (Florence, 1618). RISM ID no.: 990007800

The RISM entries describe each piece in detail according to a uniform scheme containing more than 100 fields. Included are, among other things, information about:

- Name of composer (including dates of birth and death)
- Title
- An opus or catalog number if there is one
- Performing forces
- Format – e.g. score, parts or piano reduction
- Additional names such as librettists, previous owners, and dedicatees
- References to musicological literature
- List of libraries or institutions where the item is preserved

The manuscripts are described in detail with respect to copyist and place and time of origin. Printed music includes publication information such as place, year, and publisher. In addition, many works include a music incipit, that is, the opening notes or measures from important movements or sections of a piece.

A variety of search boxes enables browsing and discovery through any of these fields. Specific questions can be answered by combining specific indexes. For example, it is possible to immediately access all the information stored by RISM about autograph manuscripts by Clara Schumann or the dissemination of manuscripts with music by François Couperin. A search by means of a music incipit is a valuable research tool when trying to identify an anonymous piece or a fragment of a piece. To make use of this tool, the researcher keys in the first few notes of the work.

Apart from the stated intention of opening the way to the primary source for researchers and performers, this sort of catalog provides attractive possibilities for other areas of interest and inquiry as well. For example, one can gain insight into many different topics while researching the reception of a piece. One way could be to find out how the music of a composer was regarded after their death; to find this out, it would be important to know how many and which works were reissued.

The database provides information not only about the dissemination of works by composers who are still well known today, but also a wealth of knowledge about those many creative musicians who were highly regarded in their day, but are currently either little known, or even forgotten. This makes the database invaluable for music historians, and also makes it possible for performing musicians to "excavate" and rediscover many things.

The data in the RISM Catalog is available under a Creative Commons license as linked data and linked open data for use in other library catalogs, projects in the digital humanities, or research projects.

=== RISM Series ===
During the initial years of the RISM project, a series of publications was conceived to organize the work of RISM and focus on specific repertories, most of which was published in book form. In the intervening years, much of the information, but not all, from the RISM series has been incorporated into the online database.

The RISM series are:

- Series A: manuscripts and printed music by composer
- Series B: inventories of sources by topic
- Series C: directory of music libraries

In addition to these, working groups conduct projects to document libretti surviving in their respective countries.

RISM Series A/I – Printed Music

RISM Series A/I Individual Prints before 1800 documents printed music editions containing works by a single composer published between 1500 and 1800. Anthologies of works by various composers are indexed in RISM series B.

Over 78,000 printed editions by 7,616 composers (arranged alphabetically) from 2,178 libraries were documented in the nine volumes of the series (published 1971–1981). Four supplementary volumes appeared between 1986 and 1999, and in 2003, an index volume followed listing publishers, printers, engravers and places of publication. All volumes of RISM series A/I were published by Bärenreiter in Kassel. The CD-ROM was published by Bärenreiter-Verlag at the end of 2012, and the CD-ROM data were incorporated into the online catalog in 2015.

RISM Series A/II – Music Manuscripts

RISM series A/II Music Manuscripts after 1600 lists only handwritten music. The project was conceived as an electronic publication from the beginning and was published as microfiche and CD-ROM. The CD-ROM version of the accumulated database produced and published by K. G. Saur in Munich was discontinued in 2008. The subscription database hosted by EBSCO (formerly by NISC) is still available. The entirety of Series A/II is in the online database, and several printed catalogs have been published based subsets of the RISM records.

RISM Series B

RISM series B documents sources by topic. The volumes in series B are published by G. Henle of Munich. Series B includes (an English translation of the title appears in parentheses where necessary):

- B/I and B/II: Recueils imprimés XVIe–XVIIIe siècles (2 Volumes). (Printed Anthologies from the 16th to the 18th Centuries; B/I is available in the online database.)
- B/III: The Theory of Music from the Carolingian Era up to c. 1500. Descriptive Catalogue of Manuscripts (6 volumes)
- B/IV: Handschriften mit mehrstimmiger Musik des 11. bis 16. Jahrhunderts (5 volumes, 1 supplementary volume). (Manuscripts with Polyphonic Music from the 11th to 16th Century)
- B/V: Tropen- und Sequenzenhandschriften. (Manuscripts of Tropes and Sequences)
- B/VI: Écrits imprimés concernant la musique (2 volumes). (Printed Writings about Music)
- B/VII: Handschriftlich überlieferte Lauten- und Gitarrentabulaturen des 15. bis 18. Jahrhunderts. (Manuscripts of Lute and Guitar Tablature from 15th to 18th Century)
- B/VIII: Das Deutsche Kirchenlied (2 volumes, Kassel: Bärenreiter). (German Hymns)
- B/IX: Hebrew Sources (2 volumes)
- B/X: The Theory of Music in Arabic Writings c. 900–1900 (2 volumes)
- B/XI: Ancient Greek Music Theory. A Catalogue Raisonné of Manuscripts.
- B/XII: Manuscrits persans concernant la musique. (Persian Manuscripts about Music)
- B/XIII: Hymnologica Slavica. Hymnologica Bohemica, Slavica (HBS), Polonica (HP), Sorabica (HS). Notendrucke des 16. bis 18. Jahrhunderts (Printed music of the 16th to the 18th centuries in Bohemia, Slovakia, Poland, and Sorbia)
- B/XIV: Les manuscrits du processionnal (2 volumes). (Manuscripts about the Processional)
- B/XV: Mehrstimmige Messen in Quellen aus Spanien, Portugal und Lateinamerika, ca. 1490–1630. (Polyphonic Masses in Sources from Spain, Portugal and Latin America, from around 1490–1630)
- B/XVI: Catalogue raisonné of the Balinese Palm-Leaf Manuscripts with Music Notation
- B/XVII: Die Triosonate: Catalogue Raisonné der gedruckten Quellen ("The Trio Sonata: A Catalogue Raisonné of the Printed Sources")
- B/XVIII/1: Les Sources manuscrites des séquences et proses notées. IXe–XVIe siècles

RISM Series C

Entitled Directory of Music Research Libraries, RISM series C lists in five volumes all the music libraries, archives, and private collections which house historical musical materials. Each institution described in Series C has a library siglum, which is an abbreviation to identify the institution where musical sources are located. The siglum is made up of capital letters representing the country, a hyphen, capital letters representing the city, and lowercase letters for the name of the institution. For example, "I-MOe" means "Italy-Modena, Biblioteca Estense Universitaria."

The special volume RISM-Bibliothekssigel. Gesamtverzeichnis (RISM Library Sigla: Complete Index), appeared in 1999 and included the sigla for institutions worldwide. The sigla directory has been available as a regularly updated searchable database on the RISM website since 2011.

== People who use the RISM publications ==
- Musicologists looking for sources connected with their field of research find a basis for exploring catalogues of works and modern editions;
- Performers who discover a vast wealth of little-known pieces for concerts off the beaten musical path;
- Librarians who can explore sources that complement the holdings of their own libraries or use the RISM database during in-library instruction;
- Students who need to consult primary sources for an assignment or term paper;
- Music antiquarians who can look up information about other copies of pieces they are offering;
- Researchers who incorporate RISM data as part of projects and analysis in the fields of digital humanities, big data, and music information retrieval
