= Répertoire international de la presse musicale =

Music periodical literature index

Répertoire international de la presse musicale (Retrospective Index to Music Periodicals, Internationales Repertorium der Musikzeitungen), commonly known as RIPM, provides access to music periodical literature published between 1750 and 1966 through an annotated index, RIPM Retrospective Index to Music Periodicals, and two full-text publication series, RIPM Retrospective Index to Music Periodicals with Full Text and RIPM Preservation Series. RIPM also provides access to full-text jazz publications from 1914 to the 2000s through RIPM Jazz Periodicals.

== Organization ==
Founded in 1980 by Howard Robert Cohen, PhD (born 1941) – in collaboration with Marcello Conati, Elvidio Surian (born 1940), and Christoph-Helmut Mahling, PhD (1932–2012) – RIPM is one of the four Répertoires (or "R" projects) established by the International Musicological Society (IMS) and the International Association of Music Libraries, Archives, and Documentation Centres (IAML); these include Le Répertoire international des sources musicales (RISM), Le Répertoire international de littérature musicale (RILM), and Le Répertoire International d'Iconographie Musicale (RIdIM). RIPM was established by these societies to address two problems: (1) the limited availability of the journals themselves, as most are found in very few libraries and in incomplete runs and/or poor physical condition, and (2) the difficulty in accessing the content in a journal once a copy has been located.

RIPM profits from a network of scholars, librarians, and archivists in more than 20 countries and maintains an editorial headquarters in Baltimore, Maryland (the RIPM International Center). To collect and complete runs of journals, RIPM works with a network of partner and participating libraries in the United States and Europe. With only rare exceptions, RIPM makes available complete runs of music journals, many of which represent the only complete copy available anywhere.

=== RIPM and RILM Collaboration ===
Together RIPM and RILM provide access to two hundred and fifty years of music periodical literature and are designed to complement each other chronologically.

== Publications ==
The RIPM Retrospective Index to Music Periodicals began as a print publication in 1988. Print publication of the Retrospective Index ceased in 2016, with 318 volumes published, but continues to be published in an online database. The original three-part publications—consisting of annotated tables of contents, keyword-in-context/author indexes, and introductory studies— lgenerated much of the content of the now-online Retrospective Index to Music Periodicals. As of September 2025, 403 music journals have been indexed with over 1.20 million annotated citations. All RIPM indexing is done in the language of the original journal.

RIPM Retrospective Index to Music Periodicals with Full Text is a searchable collection of digitized full-text journals indexed in the Retrospective Index. This archive contains complete runs of 333 rare journals available online.

RIPM Preservation Series is a searchable database of full-text journals that are not indexed like journals in the Retrospective Index. As of September 2025, the Preservation Series consists of 154 journals.

RIPM Jazz Periodicals is a searchable database of full-text jazz periodicals that includes full citations. As of September 2025, RIPM Jazz consists of 166 journals and some 432,000 citation records.

All RIPM publications are updated regularly. See list of Music Periodicals Treated by RIPM for a complete inventory.

=== Former publication ===
The journal Periodica Musica was published between 1983 and 2005. A full run of the journal is available on RIPM's website.

== Selected bibliography ==
- H. R. Cohen: "An Introduction to the Fourth "R": Le Répertoire international de la presse musicale du dix-neuvième siècle (RIPMxix)," Periodica Musica 1 (1983): 1–2.
- H. R. Cohen, "The Nineteenth-Century Press and the Music Historian: Archival Sources and Bibliographical Resources," 19th-Century Music 7 (Fall 1983): 136–42.
- H. R. Cohen, "On the Structure of the Repertory: RIPMxix Series A and Series B," Fontes Artis Musicae 30 (1983): 66–68.
- RIPMxix Commission Members, "Periodicals Selected for Priority Indexing. I: Western Europe, II: North America," Periodica Musica 1 (Spring 1983).
- H. R. Cohen, "RIPM: An Overview. A Paper Presented at the Conference of the Music Library Association, 6 March 1985," Periodica Musica 3 (1985): 31–32.
- H.R. Cohen and M. Conati: "Le Répertoire International de la Presse Musicale," Acta Musicologica, lix (1987), 308–24.
- H. R. Cohen, "Le Répertoire international de la presse musicale (RIPM) et la Belgique," Revue Belge de Musicologie 44 (1990): 177–89.
- H. R. Cohen, "RIPM: A Retrospective Index to Music Periodicals (1800–1950)," Dokumenterat 33, Bulletin från Statens musikbibliotek (December, 2002): 7–11.
- Veslemóy Heintz, "RIPM I Norden," Dokumenterat 33, Bulletin från Statens musikbibliotek (December, 2002): 11–14.
- H. R. Cohen, "RIPM: The First Twenty-Five Years," Periodica Musica 10/11 (2005): 1–2.
- M. Buja: "A Quarter-Century of Success: an Interview with H. Robert Cohen, Founder and Director of the Répertoire international de la presse musicale (RIPM)," Fontes Artis Musicae, liv (2007), 385–90.
- H.R. Cohen and B. Knysak: "RIPM Online Archive of Music Periodicals (1800–1950)," Fontes Artis Musicae, liv (2007), 391–420.

Reports delivered to the General Assembly at annual IAML congresses (1981–present) and at the bi-decadal IMS congresses (1987–present) are available on RIPM's website.
