= Walther Rehm =

German literary scholar (1901-1963)

Walther Rehm (13 November 1901 – 6 December 1963) was a German literary scholar.

== Life and family ==
Born in Erlangen, Rehm spent a large part of his school time in Strasbourg and in 1919 he took his Abitur at the Maximiliansgymnasium München. Afterwards, he studied German language and literature, history and art history at the Ludwig-Maximilians-Universität München.

In 1923, he received his doctorate with a thesis on the literary Renaissance image of the 18th and 19th centuries, and since 1929, he had been a private lecturer in the history of modern German literature in Munich. Due to blatantly expressed criticism of the National Socialist ideology and politics, planned appointments to Würzburg, Marburg/Lahn, Göttingen and Strasbourg failed. Entry into the NSDAP in 1942 as well as into the National Socialist Teachers League and the NS-Volkswohlfahrt were forced. However, the denazification process after 1945 proved difficult due to his party membership; he was only fully rehabilitated in 1950.

After a temporary professorship, Rehm was permanent professor of modern German literary history at the University of Giessen from 1940. From 1943 until his death, he taught at the University of Freiburg.

His son was the musicologist Wolfgang Rehm.

Rehm died in Freiburg im Breisgau at age 63.

== Work ==
During the National Socialist era, Rehm was able to free himself from the national zeitgeist in his scientific work by specifically addressing the unheroic, for example in the works of Dostoevsky, Kierkegaard and Jean Paul. His studies of the afterlife of antiquity remained particularly influential. (Greekism and Goethe's time) as well as on the veneration of the dead with Novalis, Hölderlin and Rilke (Orpheus. The Poets and the Dead) Finally, he was also a historical-critical editor. He rendered special services to the edition of the letters from and to Johann Joachim Winckelmann.

== Membership in societies and academies ==
- 1944: Member of the German Archaeological Institute
- 1956: Corresponding member of the Bayerische Akademie der Wissenschaften.
- Member of the Winckelmann Society in Stendal

== Publications ==
- Der Todesgedanke in der deutschen Dichtung vom Mittelalter bis zur Romantik. (1928)
- Der Renaissancekult um 1900 und seine Überwindung. (1929)
- Jacob Burckhardt (Biographie) by Walter Rehm . Verlag Huber Frauenfeld u. Leipzig 1930
- Der Untergang Roms im abendländischen Denken. (1930)
- Griechentum und Goethezeit. (1936)
- Europäische Romdichtung. (1939)
- Experimentum Medietatis. (1947)
- Kierkegaard und der Verführer. (1949)
- Orpheus. Die Dichter und die Toten. (1950)
- Götterstille und Göttertrauer. (1951). Essay collection
- Der Dichter und die neue Einsamkeit. (1969)
