= Dietrich Berke =

German musicologist

Dietrich Berke (26 February 1938 – 16 October 2010) was a German musicologist and Chief editor of the Bärenreiter music publishing house.

Born in Castrop-Rauxel, Berke studied musicology, German, and philosophy in Kiel and Würzburg where he received his doctorate in musicology in 1967. Afterwards, he was a scholarship holder of the Deutsche Forschungsgemeinschaft. From 1969 to 2002, he was a lecturer, and later chief lecturer at the Kasseler Bärenreiter publishing house. Since 1973, he has also been a member of the editorial management of the Neue Mozart-Ausgabe.

Berke compiled and supervised editions in the Neue Mozart-Ausgabe and the Neue Schubert-Ausgabe. He published yearbooks and commemorative publications, wrote essays on Mozart and Schubert research as well as on the life and work of Heinrich Schütz, on music philology, publishing and copyright. He has been a member of the boards of directors of sponsoring associations and of executive committees of various musicological monuments and complete editions.

Berke was a member of the Georg-Friedrich-Händel-Gesellschaft in Halle.

Berke died in Zierenberg at the age of 72.

== Publications ==
- Neue Ausgabe sämtlicher Werke / Werkgruppe 21. Duos und Trios für Streicher und Bläser : Serie 8, Kammermusik / vorgel.
- Alte Musik als ästhetische Gegenwart : Bach, Händel, Schütz; Bericht über den internationalen musikwissenschaftlichen Kongreß, Stuttgart 1985 vol. 1.
- Neue Ausgabe sämtlicher Werke Ser. 1 [Geistliche Gesangswerke] Werkgruppe 1 [Messen und Requiem] Abt. 2 Requiem, Teilband. 1: Mozarts Fragment, Teilband. 2: Mozarts Fragment mit den Ergänzungen von Eybler und Süssmayr/ (Leopold Nowak) (...) Kritische Berichte
- Die neue Mozart-Ausgabe : Texte, Bilder, Chronik 1955-2007
- Die Zauberflöte : K. 620; facsimile of the autograph score, Staatsbibliothek zu Berlin - Preußischer Kulturbesitz, (Mus.ms.autogr. W.A. Mozart 620)
