= Music library =

Library of music

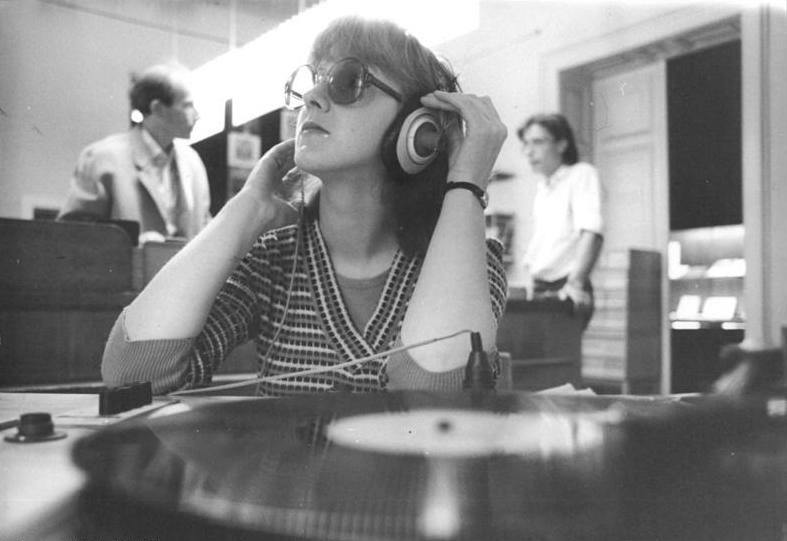
Music library, Leipzig, 1985

A music library contains music-related materials for patron use. Collections may also include non-print materials, such as digitized music scores or audio recordings. Use of such materials may be limited to specific patron groups, especially in private academic institutions. Music library print collections include dictionaries and encyclopedias, indexes and directories, printed music, music serials, bibliographies, and other music literature. Some public libraries have music rooms.

== Types ==
Traditionally, there are four types of music libraries:

1. Those developed to support departments of music in university or college settings;
2. Those developed to support conservatories and schools of music;
3. Those housed within public libraries;
4. Those developed as independent libraries or archives supporting music organizations.

== Musical instrument library ==
A musical instrument library lends or shares musical instruments. Examples can be found in Canada; Massachusetts, Illinois, Ohio, Washington and New York in the United States.

With the development of the media industry (film production, production of computer games, advertising), musical works created using digital technologies have become especially in demand, characterized by the use of various audio effects libraries and musical instruments. Over the past decade, many digital musical instrument library companies have grown, including Spitfire, Cinesamples, Heavyocity, Soundiron, and Native Instruments. Some are focused on reproducing the sounds of the instruments of the classical orchestra in digital format, others on creating libraries of traditional folk instruments, including Arabic instruments, Turkish, Iranian, Indian, Japanese and others.

== Other uses ==
- Production music libraries license stock music for use in film, television, and radio productions.
- Performance libraries serve performing music groups, particularly large orchestras, by acquiring, preparing, and maintaining music for performance.
- Digital music libraries and archives preserve recordings and digitized scores or literature in a variety of electronic formats. Many music libraries dedicate part of their duties to digitizing parts of their collection and maintaining digital files. Digital materials may be part of a larger, physical collection, or may compose an entirely electronic collection not physically accessible (usually housed on a network or on the Internet). Access may be limited as a fee-based service, a private service to specific user groups (such as students at a conservatory), or freely accessible to the public.

== See also ==
- List of online music databases
- Music librarianship
- Music Library Association
- Universal Circulating Music Library
