= International Association of Music Information Centres =

Network of contemporary music organizations

The International Association of Music Information Centres (IAMIC) is a worldwide network of organisations that document and promote contemporary music.

== History ==
In 1958, a number of representatives of national music information centres formed a group under the UN's International Music Council. The members of this group became a branch of the International Association of Music Libraries (IAML) in 1962.

In 1986 the International Association of Music Information Centres (IAMIC) was founded, with its own board of directors. In 1991, IAMIC became fully independent and broke away from the IAML.

== Description and functions ==
The IAMIC is based in Belgium.

Each member music information centre promotes and documents the music of its own country of region over a variety of musical genres including contemporary classical music, world music, jazz, and popular music. Its member organisations manage extensive resources (large libraries of sheet music, recordings, biographical and research materials) and deliver promotional and artistic projects (festivals, concerts, competitions, conferences) to the public.

While each member organisation focuses on the promotion of musical activities in their country or region, IAMIC works to promote international exchange on issues of common concern and brings these organisations together for collective projects.
