= International Association of Music Libraries, Archives and Documentation Centres =

Organization of music libraries

Logo

The International Association of Music Libraries, Archives and Documentation Centres (IAML) (Note: Also known as Association Internationale des Bibliothèques, Archives et Centres de Documentation Musicaux (AIBM) and Internationale Vereinigung der Musikbibliotheken, Musikarchive und Musikdokumentationszentren (IVMB)) is an organisation of libraries with music departments, music conservatory libraries, radio and orchestra archives, university institutes, music documentation centers, music publishers, and music dealers that fosters international cooperation and promotes music bibliography and music library science. It was founded in Paris in 1951 and its three official languages are English, German, and French.

== History ==
IAML was founded after World War II to "promote international cooperation and standardization in such matters as cataloging, standards of service, personnel training and the exchange of materials between libraries." The founding of IAML was a three-year process from 1949 to 1951. It was part of the United Nations' mission to promote world peace. The founding conferences were held in Basel and Florence in 1949, in Lüneburg in 1950, and in Paris in 1951, the last one conducted by UNESCO.

The Accademia Nazionale Luigi Cherubini celebrated its 100th anniversary in 1949, an event that brought around 60 music librarians, musicologists, and museum professionals from twelve countries to Florence. This was the first meeting of music librarians from around the world; plans for a separate organization had been discussed since the founding of the International Musicological Society in 1927, but the Second World War prevented anything from taking shape. The war had caused heavy losses at many libraries, and international cooperation was of utmost importance.

The goals of the Florence conference included updating the status and locations of the musical sources described in Robert Eitner's Biographisch-Bibliographisches Quellen-Lexikon der Musiker und Musikgelehrten der christlichen Zeitrechnung bis zur Mitte des neunzehnten Jahrhunderts (Leipzig, 1900–1904), establishing a central office in each country responsible for microfilming musical sources from before 1800, and addressing issues related to music cataloging. The first goal was realized in 1952 with the founding of the Répertoire International des Sources Musicales.

In 1951, IAML had 120 participants from 23 countries, by 1952, their membership had grown to 230. Membership grew to about 1,100 members in 39 countries in 1969 and 1,850 members in 40 countries in 1991. As of 2025 there are 24 national branches with IAML presences in a further 10 countries.

IAML has professional sections, subject sections, study group, and project groups that focus on particular aspects of music librarianship and documentation. Two professional organizations, the International Association of Music Information Centres and the International Association of Sound and Audiovisual Archives began as IAML groups but later formed their own organizations.

=== President ===
List of presidents of the International Association of Music Libraries, Archives and Documentation Centres (IAML)
Name	Country	Tenure
John H. Roberts	United States	2001 - 2004
Massimo Gentili-Tedeschi	Italy	2004 - 2007
Martie Severt	Netherlands	2007 - 2010
Roger Flury	New Zealand	2010 - 2013
Barbara Dobbs Mackenzie	United States	2013 - 2016
Stanisław Hrabia	Poland	2016 - 2019
Pia Shekhter	Sweden	2019 - 2023
Rupert Ridgewell	United Kingdom	2023 - 2026

== Structure ==
The IAML Board comprises the president, immediate past president (2 years) or president-elect (1 year), secretary general, treasurer, and four elected vice presidents. The Board governs IAML together with the (annual) General Assembly. National Branches and Subject Sections are represented respectively by the Forum of National Representatives and the Forum of Sections.

IAML is affiliated with the International Federation of Library Associations and Institutions (IFLA), the International Music Council, and the International Musicological Society (IMS).

IAML has members in over forty countries and local representation in the form of a national branch in 26 of its members' countries. Where there is a IAML national branch it usually serves as the national music library organization in that country. Countries with national branches include: Austria, Brazil, Canada, Croatia, Czech Republic, Estonia, Finland, France, Germany, Greece, Hungary, Italy, Japan, Netherlands, New Zealand, Norway, Poland, Slovakia, South Korea, Spain, Sweden, Switzerland. United Kingdom and Ireland, and United States.

== Activities ==
In addition to annual conferences or congresses, IAML has implemented four main programmes, together known as the "R projects" of musicology: Répertoire international des sources musicales (RISM), Répertoire international de littérature musicale (RILM), Répertoire International d'Iconographie Musicale (RIdIM) and Répertoire international de la presse musicale (RIPM). IAML publishes a journal, Fontes Artis Musicae, with articles on music librarianship and bibliography as well as reports on IAML conferences and on the progress of the "R projects".

=== Annual congresses ===
IAML holds annual congresses in different locations around the world. Occasionally, meetings are held jointly with other professional organizations. After the founding meetings held from 1949 to 1951, annual meetings commenced in 1954. and have since run continuously, including an online-only meeting in 2020 during the Covid19 pandemic.

=== Répertoire international des sources musicales ===
RISM was founded in 1953 and deals with the bibliography of sources in music and music literature from Greek antiquity up to 1800.

=== Répertoire international de littérature musicale ===
RILM, founded in 1966, covers music literature through two online databases: RILM Abstracts of Music Literature, which extends from 1967 to the present, and RILM Retrospective Abstracts of Music Literature (RILM Retro), which covers literature from before 1967.

=== Répertoire international d'iconographie musicale ===
RIdIM, founded in 1971, deals with visual materials relating to music.

=== Répertoire international de la presse musicale ===
RIPM, founded in 1980, preserves, reconstructs, and makes available music periodicals originally published from ca. 1760 to 1966. By 2014, RIPM has indexed 215 music periodicals, published 306 printed volumes and a database of more than 726,000 annotated citations. Furthermore, through the RIPM Online Archive and e-Library, RIPM has made available 166 music journals in full-text.

=== Fontes Artis Musicae ===
Fontes artis musicae is a quarterly, peer-reviewed journal, featuring articles relevant to the purposes of IAML, particularly in the area of international music librarianship and documentation, bibliography, audio-visual materials, and musicology.

Fontes artis musicae was founded in 1954 to succeed the members-only Information Bulletin. It was not originally peer reviewed.
