= Kate van Orden =

American musicologist and bassoonist

Kate van Orden is an American musicologist and bassoonist, currently Dwight P. Robinson Jr. Professor of Music at Harvard University.

== Biography ==
Van Orden obtained a Ph.D. in Music History and Theory from the University of Chicago in 1996.

She worked at the University of California, Berkeley, from 1997 until moving to Harvard in 2013. She was editor-in-chief of the Journal of the American Musicological Society from 2008 to 2010, and currently serves on the editorial boards of Early Music History, Saggiatore Musicale, Oxford Bibliographies, and The New Cultural History of Music. Her principal research interest is the French chanson, on which she has written two books.

Van Orden has made numerous recordings with Les Arts Florissants (dir. William Christie), Collegium Vocale Ghent (dir. Philippe Herreweghe), Anima Aeterna (dir. Jos Van Immerseele), La Petite Bande (dir. Sigiswald Kuijken), Tafelmusik (dir. Jeanne Lamon), Philharmonia Baroque Orchestra (dir. Nicholas McGegan), and American Bach Soloists (dir. Jeffrey Thomas).

== Bibliography ==
=== As author ===
- Music, Discipline, and Arms in Early Modern France (Chicago: The University of Chicago Press, 2005)
- Music, Authorship, and the Book in the First Century of Print (Berkeley and Los Angeles: University of California Press, 2014)
- Materialities: Books, Readers, and the Chanson in 16th-Century Europe (New York: Oxford University Press, 2015)

=== As editor ===
- Music and the Cultures of Print, edited and with an introduction by Kate van Orden, afterword by Roger Chartier (New York: Garland Publishing Inc., 2000)
