= Robert Eitner =

German musicologist and bibliographer

Robert Eitner (22 October 1832 – 22 January 1905) was a German musicologist and bibliographer.

== Life ==
Eitner was born and grew up in Breslau, the rapidly industrialising administrative capital of Silesia. He attended the St. Elisabeth Gymnasium (secondary school) in the city before moving on to study at the university where for five years he was taught by the organist-composer Moritz Brosig. Sources nevertheless stress that in many respects Eitner was self-taught.

In 1853 he moved to Berlin, becoming a music teacher. A succession of piano compositions and songs followed. In 1863 he opened his own music school, but by now he was increasingly diverting his attention away from teaching and towards music research and writing. In 1867 he produced a "Lexicon of Dutch Composers" which won a prize from the Amsterdam "Society for the promotion of Music", although in the end it was never published.

In 1868 Eitner headed up the establishment in Berlin of the "Society of Music Research" (Gesellschaft für Musikforschung), becoming secretary to the association and editor of its monthly magazine, Monatshefte für Musik-Geschichte, launched in 1869. Another series of publications from the association was the 29-volume set entitled Publikation älterer praktischer und theoretischer Musikwerke, although it appears that this was never published in its entirety. There was also a succession of bibliographical works, which reflected Eitner's own enthusiasm for compositions from the sixteenth and seventeenth centuries. In addition, there was a ten-volume reference compendium entitled Biographisch-Bibliographisches Quellen-Lexikon der Musiker und Musikgelehrten der christlichen Zeitrechnung bis zur Mitte des neunzehnten Jahrhunderts, published between 1900 and 1904 in Leipzig, which set out the locations of both printed and manuscript works by early composers and musicologists, and which in the end was sufficiently valued as a research tool to be available in more than 200 major libraries in Europe. (Note: Available on the Gallica website.)

He also contributed 399 biographical articles to the Allgemeine Deutsche Biographie, almost all of them on musicians.

In 1882 he moved to Templin, a country town between Berlin and the Baltic coast. It was here that he died in 1905.

== Publications ==
Among his published works are the following:

=== Books ===
As author

- Verzeichniss neuer Ausgaben alter Musikwerke aus der frühesten Zeit bis zum Jahre 1800: Mit einem alphabetisch geordneten Inhaltsanzeiger der Komponisten und ihrer Werke. Berlin: T. Trautwein, 1871
- Chronologisches Verzeichniss der gedruckten Werke von Hans Leo von Hassler und Orlandus de Lassus. Berlin: T. Trautwein, 1874
- Bibliographie der Musik-Sammelwerke des XVI. und XVII. Jahrhunderts: Im Vereine mit Frz. Xav. Haberl, A. Lagerberg und C. F. Pohl bearbeitet und herausgegeben von Robert Eitner (i.e., with Franz Xaver Haberl, Anders Lagerberg and Carl Ferdinand Pohl). Berlin: Leo Liepmannssohn, 1877
- Die Oper von ihren ersten Anfängen bis 1750: Nach den Quellen mitgetheilt und mit einem einleitenden Texte versehen, 3 volumes. Berlin: T. Trautwein, 1881–1885
- Bücherverzeichnis der Musik-Literatur aus den Jahren 1839 bis 1846: Im Anschlusse an Becker's Systematisch-chronologische Darstellung der Musik-Literatur. Berlin: T. Trautwein, 1885
- Quellen- und Hilfswerke beim Studium der Musikgeschichte. Leipzig: Breitkopf & Härtel, 1891
- Biographisch-bibliographisches Quellen-Lexikon der Musiker und Musikgelehrten der christlichen Zeitrechnung bis zur Mitte des neunzehnten Jahrhunderts. Leipzig: Breitkopf & Härtel, 1900–1904
- Buch- und Musikalienhändler, Buch- und Musikaliendrucker nebst Notenstecher, nur die Musik betreffend, nach den Originaldrucken verzeichnet. Leipzig: Breitkopf & Härtel, 1904

As editor

- Publikation aelterer praktischer und theoretischer Musikwerke, 29 volumes, 1873–1905:
1. Ein hundert fünfzehn weltliche und einige geistliche Lieder (Johann Ott, 1544), 1873
2. Eyn Enchiridion oder Handbüchlein (Erfurt, 1524), 1874
3. Die Oper von ihren Anfängen bis zur Mitte des 18. Jahrhunderts, Erster Theil (Caccini, Peri, Monteverdi), 1875
4. Vierstimmige Lieder (Heinrich Finck), 1876
5. Dodecachordon (Heinrich Glarean), 1876
6. Das Glogauer Liederbuch, 1877
7. Vierstimmige Lieder (Hermann Finck), 1878
8. Die Oper, Erster Theil (supplement, libretti), 1879
9. Liederbuch (Peter Schöffer, 1513), 1880
10. Die Oper, Zweiter Theil (Cavalli, Il Giasone), 1881
11. Oden und Lieder (Sebastian Ochsenkun), 1882
12. Die Oper, Zweiter Theil (score of Il Giasone), 1883
13. Die Oper, Dritter Theil (Cesti, La Dori), 1884
14. Die Oper, Dritter Theil (score of La Dori), 1885
15. Dramatische Werke (Lechner and Eccard), 1886
16. Cantiones sacrae (Michael Praetorius), 1887
17. Die Oper, Vierter Theil (Alessandro Scarlatti), 1888
18. Die Oper, Fünfter Theil (Steffani, Alarico), 1889
19. Die Oper, Sechster Theil (Keiser, Prinz Jodelet), 1890
20. Symphoniae jucundae (Georg Rhau, 1538), 1891
21. Liederbuch (Arnt von Aich, about 1519), 1892
22. Dramatische Werke (Josquin des Prez), 1893
23. Die Oper, Siebenter Theil (Lully, Armide), 1894
24. Die Oper, Achter Theil (Gluck, Orfeo), 1895
25. Dramatische Werke (Hans Leo Hassler), 1896
26. Orazio Vecchi: L'Amfiparnaso, 1897
27. Dramatische Werke (Claudio Monteverdi, Orfeo), 1898
28. 60 Chansons (French and Dutch masters, sixteenth century), 1899
29. Gedruckte achtstimmige Messen (Sweelinck), 1905

=== Periodicals ===
- Monatshefte für Musik-Geschichte (1869–1905)
