= Music librarianship =

Music librarianship is the area of librarianship that pertains to music collections and their development, cataloging, preservation and maintenance, as well as reference issues connected with musical works and music literature. Music librarians often have degrees in both music and librarianship (typically, a Master of Library and Information Science and at least a college-level music degree). Music librarians deal with standard librarianship duties such as cataloging and reference, which become more complicated when music scores and recordings are involved. Therefore, music librarians generally read music and have at least a basic understanding of both music theory and music history to aid in their duties.

== History ==
Most early written classical music was predominantly sacred; collections of written music and literature were held by monasteries, cathedrals, and other religious establishments, such as church music societies, offices, and seminaries. As universities emerged in the 12th century, libraries formed throughout Europe, and obtained donations or gifts from monasteries and private collectors. The advent of national and centralized libraries two centuries later allowed for greater attention to special materials like music collections. Up to the end of the 15th century, music collections had been limited to religious organizations, private collectors, or small areas of university libraries. Public collections grew with the development of printing at the end of the 15th century and the surge of scholarly and artistic endeavors of the Renaissance.

Music librarianship since the Renaissance has grown alongside modern librarianship, but with more unique, dedicated facilities for materials. In the 18th and 19th centuries, the establishment of conservatories created a need for music collections that supported learning at those institutions. While the proliferation of classification schemes has given music a niche in modern public and academic collections, other institutions maintaining music-only collections have contributed to the rise of music libraries. These include conservatories, music information centers, composers' and performing rights associations, opera houses, music publishers, and media facilities involved with broadcasting and film.

== Education ==
In the United States, most librarianship degrees begin at the graduate level. At the undergraduate level, potential music librarians study music at any number of schools and programs (theory, history, performance, production, business and education). Following the coupling of an MLS and undergraduate music degree, many music librarians also elect to study music at the graduate level. Additionally, doctorate programs are available in both music and library science. In Masters level degrees of library science, typical music-oriented offerings examine the different materials of music collections, such as music-specific dictionaries, encyclopedias, bibliographies, indexes, and other music literature. Music librarianship offerings may also address music reference, cataloging issues, collection development and maintenance, binding and repair, preservation, evaluation methods of antiquarian material appraisal, and music librarianship education (teaching methods). Certain music librarianship areas of practice do not require a library degree—performance library management, for example.

In 1974, the Music Library Association published a set of qualifications for music librarians. The "minimum qualifications expected of a beginning music librarian" were restricted to knowledge of materials and resources of the music library, general librarianship skills, and general music knowledge which states that candidates for music librarian positions should have music degrees preferably a bachelor's and a master's degree; a master's in library science; courses in music librarianship and/or experience working in a music library; familiarity with foreign languages, and a commitment to continued growth and education as seen through work in professional organizations, such as the Music Library Association.

Librarians usually receive on-the-job training to become familiar with the inner workings of their collections. This may include training in a particular classification scheme (such as Library of Congress Classification or ANSCR), binding procedures, or protocols regarding patron usage of materials. Additionally, many librarians elect to participate in continuing education classes and programs available through professional organizations and other outlets. For example, music librarians preparing for a large scale cataloging project might take a cataloging workshop focusing on a particular scheme or music cataloging issue. Librarians training for a position that involves a new technology might apply to classes offered by external companies in specific software or hardware.

The ultimate goal of music library education is to engender core competencies in students preparing to enter the field.

The Music Library Association maintains a list of library and information science schools that teach music librarianship or accept music credits as part of their library degree programs.

== Facilities ==
Music librarians work with collections in a variety of settings. Music libraries take several forms, and often are maintained as a part of a larger collection or institution.

The nature of a music library facility depends heavily on the role of the music library within its parent institution. At academic institutions dedicated to music (such as a music conservatory), the music library may be the main library collection of the school. In colleges or universities where music is only one aspect of academic focus, the music collection may be integrated into the greater library system, or a separate collection from the main library.

Performance music libraries serve a unique function and are often housed with performance spaces. Entirely digital music collections require server space and proper housing of digitization equipment, although many music libraries in the process of digitization have facilities for such services. Other factors influencing facilities include the types of materials in the collection, the users who will access those materials, and budget constraints related to implementation, acquisition, maintenance, and service.

== Areas of practice ==
Most music librarians have an array of tasks to perform, depending on the nature of their collection and position. General duties include cataloging and reference, acquisition and collection development. It is common to specialize in one or more areas of music librarianship, particularly for work in special collections.

=== Cataloging and classification ===
Music materials require different cataloging methods than other fields. While music literature can be classified and cataloged following general cataloging rules that apply to all subjects, music scores and sound recordings present unique challenges of both description and access. Examples include uniform titles, responsibility (composer versus performer), and how to classify sound recordings (by genre, composer, etc.).

=== References ===
Music reference requires knowledge of music history, the ability to read music and have at least a basic understanding of music theory, and a strong grasp of music reference literature: dictionaries and encyclopedias, indexes and directories, bibliographies and discographies, and music score formats. Reference also necessitates adeptness with electronic resources and tools. Reading ability in German and Romance languages are practical skills to possess when working closely with western classical music. When working with non-western music, an ethnomusicology background may be essential.

=== Acquisition and collection development ===
In order to grow their collections, music librarians purchase books and music reference materials, subscribe to serials, order music scores and sound recordings, and buy or license electronic resources. This involves not only contact with publishers and other agencies that provide music materials, but also budgetary management of library funds.

== Preservation ==
Preservation of music is the maintenance of musical compositions and preventing music from extinction. Music collections require certain conditions for the preservation of printed materials. Appropriate air regulation prevents the accumulation of moisture, and materials should be protected from the possibility of water or fire damage. Music scores often need new binding either because of weak publisher bindings or due to age. Although binding is done mainly for preservation, it also to provide uniformity (binding music allows for uniform barcode or call number placement, for example). Music library staff usually allocate part of their duties to managing binding and processing of scores. Some music libraries outsource binding to professional companies, and a few music libraries have dedicated binding staff and resources.

Sound recordings present another level of preservation. Light protection, temperature and humidity control, and particular shelving, packaging, and cleaning procedures must be followed for proper storage for preserving physical materials. Electronic files (documents and sound recordings) require preservation, too. Migration, replication, emulation, and metadata attachment aid in preservation of digital documents.

=== Special collections ===
==== Performance ====
Performance music librarians act as support for performing groups by acquiring printed music and preparing it for performance. Preparation involves managing multiple parts, collating and creating folders of music for each player, and usually marking specific notes or edits in the music, such as bowing directions for string instruments. Performance libraries then store the music for future performance or return it (if the music has been rented).

==== Production ====
Production music librarians maintain collections that own licensed music. This music is distributed on license to other institutions or performing groups for profit.

==== Antiquarian and rare collections ====
Antiquarian music collections are usually housed in very large music libraries, institutional special collections archives, or in private collections. The antiquarian trade often involves purchasing materials from private collections at auctions. Antiquarian and rare materials require extra care in handling and preservation. The age of materials can reach back several hundred years and can have considerable value.

==== Digital collections ====
Digitization is the process by which printed music or literature is converted to digital formats by a scanner. Digitization is also the process of transferring audio formats (for example, converting music on an LP record to mp3). Materials may also be born-digital; that is, created originally as a digital document or file. Many music librarians dedicate part of their duties to digitizing elements of their collection. Some libraries are entirely digital collections, and may not have physical access at all. These are usually hosted on the Internet or a network, and most often electronic access is limited to specific user groups (sometimes by subscription). Digital libraries deal with digital decay, security and access, and copyright issues involved with distributing and/or copying data to users.

== Technology ==
Because of the nature of the materials in a music library, music librarians employ technologies related to audio delivery, access to digital material, and print music preservation and presentation.

Audio collections require dependable audio-delivery systems, including headphones, receivers, and audio players (CD, DAT, phonograph, etc.). Attention is paid in particular to where listening stations are located in the library, to accommodate for noise, access to audio materials, and access to other technology like computers (especially if audio is streamed through a computer from an online digital collection). Some libraries may opt for listening stations or rooms separate from the main library area.

Music libraries that digitize parts of their collection require scanners for printed materials, and devices for transferring analog audio to digital formats. Computers are needed to control, convert, stream, store, preserve, or otherwise manipulate digitized material. Entirely digital collections involve technology for connecting users to electronic materials, usually hosted on the Internet. Information professionals involved with these projects deal with issues such as streaming, security and access, copy protection and copyright, and database management.

== Professional organizations ==
Professional organizations related to music librarianship include:

- The Music Library Association (MLA): the official organization for the music librarianship profession in the United States
- International Association of Music Libraries, Archives and Documentation Centres (IAML): a group with a wide scope, sustaining the development of music library projects around the world.
- The Canadian Association of Music Libraries, Archives and Documentation Centres | (CAML): the Canadian branch of IAML.
- Major Orchestra Librarians' Association (MOLA): Generally dedicated to performance music library issues, MOLA membership is open to conductors, musicians, and publishers, as well as performance music librarians.
- Association of College and Research Libraries, Arts Section (ACRL ARTS): ACRL ARTS is a division of the American Library Association (ALA), the main professional organization for librarians in the United States. This division focuses on both visual and performing arts, and is like a smaller version of the Music Library Association.
- Audiovisual Catalogers (OLAC): a support website for cataloging issues related to AV materials, aiding in communication between catalogers as a means to develop uniform cataloging practices.
- Theatre Library Association (TLA): The TLA is a support organization for librarians involved with performing arts collections, including dance, motion picture, and broadcasting.
- Music OCLC Users Group (MOUG): The Music Online Computer Library Center Users Group is a resource for music librarians who use OCLC services.
- American Musicological Society (AMS): The organization dedicated to research in different fields of music.
- Association for Recorded Sound Collections (ARSC): supports all types of audio collections and professions related to sound recordings. ARSC is geared particularly toward preservation and projects studying sound recordings and collections.
- Society for American Music (SAM): The organization concerned with all aspects of North and Central American (and Caribbean) music.

Additionally, music librarians will find support from academic and corporate institutions that offer grants, continuing education, inter-institutional cooperation (such as interlibrary loan or out-sourced services like digitization), and resources aiding in the completion of tasks in the field.

== Current issues ==
Cataloging concerns remain constant topics for debate in music librarianship. Digitization problems and electronic bibliographic, reference and archival tools are also at the front lines of the field as library technology moves forward. Efficiency of digitization has been increasing as library storage space has been diminishing, so more libraries are turning toward digitization not only to preserve materials in electronic formats, but also to save space. The open access movement is having an effect on music libraries, notably in subscription- or fee-based electronic services versus freely accessible electronic services.

Copyright is another major issue in this field. As a score travels from the pen of a composer to the music stand of a performer, it changes many hands. Composers may copyright and even distribute their own work, but it might also be distributed by a corporate publisher. Music libraries pay for copies of works, but sometimes only rent the work through a license. Because music copyright is an intricate issue, music librarians must carefully abide by copyright guidelines, such as those noted on the Music Library Association website.

Major field publications such as Notes (the MLA's quarterly journal), as well as email listservs, forums, and presentations at meetings of professional organizations, highlight and analyze key trends in music librarianship.
