= List of compositions by Germaine Tailleferre =

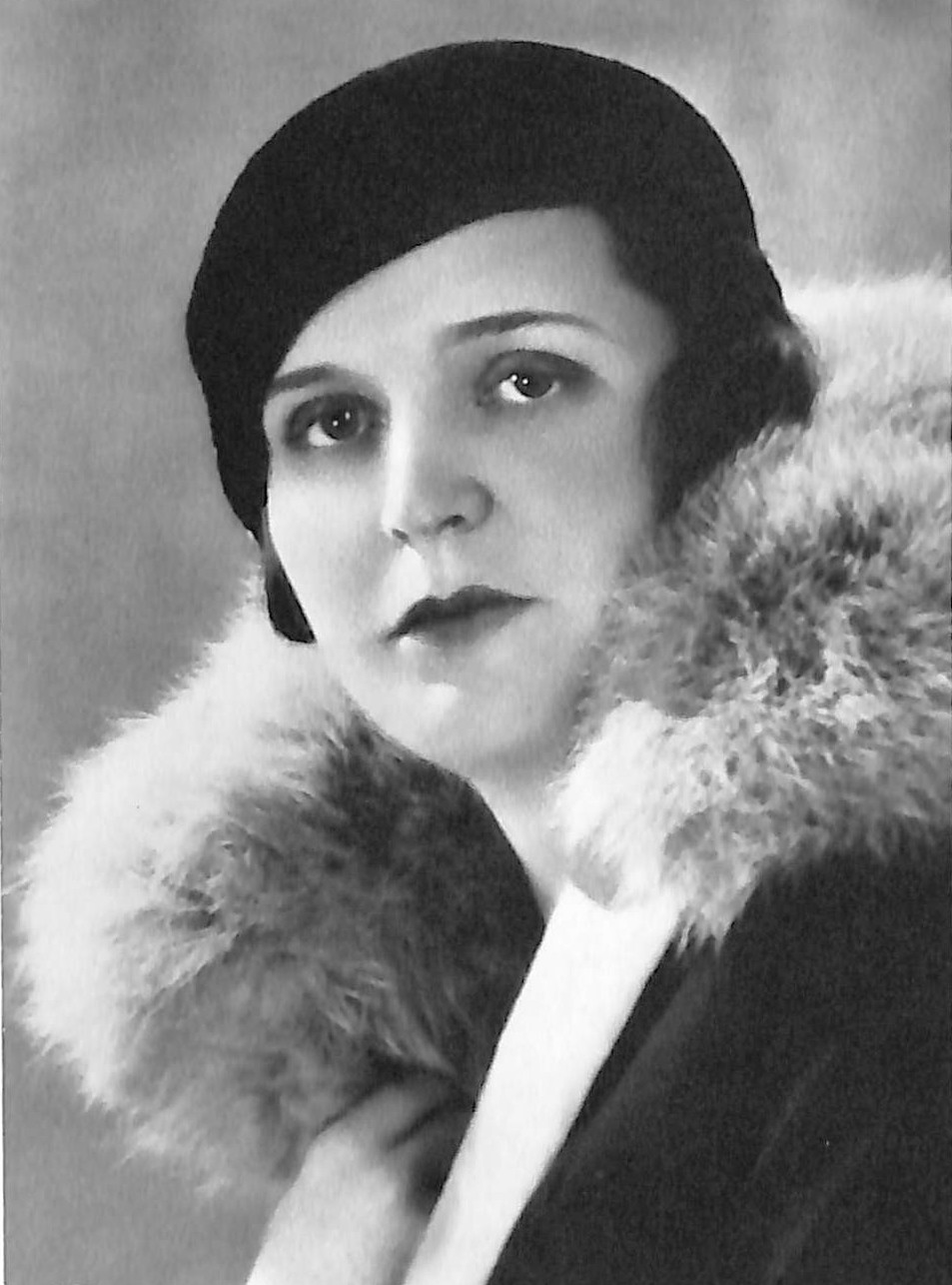
Germaine Tailleferre

This is a list of compositions by Germaine Tailleferre (1892–1983). It includes concert works, film and television score and popular works. It does not include arrangements, harmonisations or transcriptions. In the interest of clarity, some works which are essentially the same works with different titles (the Concerto for Soprano and Orchestra and the Concerto de la Fidelité, for example) have been omitted.

There is a great deal of discussion amongst musicologists as to the authenticity of the various catalogs already published in the handful of biographical works devoted to Germaine Tailleferre, one of which even includes a category of "titles which were not given by the composer". Many works included in those catalogs are missing from this list because they cannot be verified by either published scores or primary manuscript sources. In order to establish this catalog, we used three types of sources:

1. Works which are easily verifiable through either published scores, recordings, copies of film and television presentations kept in national archives and works for which concert programmes have been kept at libraries or archives.
2. The records kept at the SACEM (the French performing rights association), using both the old paper catalog and the new computerized catalog.
3. Robert Orledge's catalog of manuscript sources in Germaine Tailleferre (1892–1983) : A Centenary Appraisal" Muziek & Wetenschap 2 (Summer 1992) which he examined in Paris during September, 1991, which include complete scientific descriptions of the manuscript objects.

== Chronological list ==
=== Through World War II ===
- 1909 Impromptu for piano
- 1910 Premières prouesses, for piano four hands
- 1910 Morceau de lecture, for harp
- 1912 Fantasie sur thème de G. Cassade, for piano quintet
- 1913 Berceuse, for violin and piano
- 1913 Romance for piano
- 1913–1917 Le petit livre de harpe de Mme Tardieu
- 1917 Jeux de plein air, for two pianos
- 1917–1926 Jeux de plein air, for orchestra
- 1917–1919 String Quartet
- 1917 Calme et sans lenteur, for piano trio
- 1918 Image, for 8 instruments (flute, clarinet, celesta, piano, string quartet)
- 1918 Image, for piano 4 hands
- 1919 Pastorale, for piano, for L'Album des Six
- 1920 Morceau symphonique, for piano/orchestra
- 1920 Ballade for piano and orchestra
- 1920 Très vite, for piano
- 1920 Hommage à Debussy, for piano
- 1920 Fandango, for 2 pianos
- 1921 Les mariés de la tour Eiffel : Quadrille/Valse des Dépeches, for orchestra
- 1921 Première sonate, for violin and piano
- 1923 Le marchand d'oiseaux, ballet for orchestra
- 1923 Ballade for piano and orchestra
- 1923 Concerto no. 1 for piano and orchestra
- 1924 Adagio for violin and Piano
- 1925 Berceuse du petit elephant, for solo voice/chorus/French horns
- 1925 Mon cousin de Cayenne, incidental music for ensemble
- 1925 Ban'da, for chorus and orchestra
- 1927 Concertino, for harp and orchestra
- 1927 Sous le rempart d'Athènes, incidental music for orchestra
- 1928 Deux valses, for two pianos
- 1928 Pastorale en la bémol, for piano
- 1928 Sicilienne, for piano
- 1928 Nocturno-Fox for two baritone voices and ensemble
- 1929 La nouvelle Cythère, for two pianos or orchestra
- 1929 Six chansons françaises, for voice and piano
- 1929 Pastorale en ut, for piano
- 1929 Pastorale Inca, for piano
- 1929 Vocalise-étude for high voice and piano
- 1930 Fleurs de France, for piano or string orchestra
- 1931 Zoulaïna, opéra comique (French text by Georges Hirsch)
- 1932 Ouverture, for orchestra
- 1934 Largo for Violin and Piano
- 1934 La chasse à l'enfant, for voice and piano (French text by Jacques Prévert)
- 1934 Le chanson de l'éléphant, for voice and piano
- 1934 Deux Poèmes de Lord Byron, for high voice and piano (English text by Lord Byron)
- 1934 Concerto for Two Pianos, Chorus, Saxophones, and Orchestra
- 1935 Divertissement dans le style Louis Quinze, incidental music for orchestra, including baroque instruments
- 1935 Les souliers, film music
- 1935 Chanson de Firmin, for voice and piano, French text by Henri Jeanson
- 1936 Cadenzas for Mozart’s Piano Concerto no. 22 in E-flat
- 1936 Cadenzas for Haydn’s Piano Concerto no. 15
- 1937 Concerto for Violin and Orchestra
- 1937 Au pavilion d'Alsace, for piano
- 1937 Provincia, film score
- 1937 Symphonie graphique, film score
- 1937 Sur les routes d'acier, film score
- 1937 Terre d'effort et de liberté, film score
- 1937 Ces dames aux chapeaux verts, film score
- 1938 Cantate de Narcisse, for baritone martin, soprano, SSAA chorus, strings, and timpani
- 1938 Le petit chose, film score
- 1939 Prélude et fugue, for organ, with trumpet and trombone, ad lib.
- 1940 Bretagne', film score
- 1941 Les deux timides, film score
- 1942 Trois études, for piano and orchestra
- 1942 Pastorale, for flute (or violin) and piano
- 1943 Deux danses du marin de Bolivar, for piano

=== Return to France to 1960 ===
- 1946 Les confidences d'un microphone, for piano, radio music
- 1946 Intermezzo pour deux pianos
- 1946 Intermezzo for Flute and Piano
- 1946 Coïncidences, film score
- 1948 Paris-Magie, ballet for orchestra or two pianos
- 1949 Quadrille, ballet for orchestra
- 1949 Paysages de France, suite for orchestra
- 1949 Paris sentimentale, for voice and piano (French text by Marthe Lacloche)
- 1950 Les marchés du sud, film music
- 1951 Deuxième sonate, for violin and piano
- 1951 Parfums, musical comedy
- 1951 Il était un petit navire, opéra comique (French libretto by Henri Jeanson)
- 1951 Suite Il était un petit navire, for two pianos
- 1951–54 La bohème éternale, theatre music
- 1951(?) Chant chinois, for piano
- 1951 Concerto no. 2, for piano and orchestra
- 1952 Sarabande de La guirlande de Campra, for orchestra
- 1952 Seule dans la forêt, for piano
- 1952 Dans la clairière, for piano
- 1952 Concertino for Flute, Piano and String Orchestra
- 1952 Sicilienne, for flute and two pianos
- 1952 Le roi de la création, film music
- 1952 Valse pour le funambule for Piano
- 1952 Caroline au pays natal, film score
- 1952 Caroline au palais, film score
- 1952 Conférence des animaux, radio music
- 1953 Caroline fait du cinéma, film score
- 1953 Cher vieux Paris, film score
- 1953 Caroline du sud, film score
- 1953 Gavarni et son temps, television score
- 1953 Parisiana, ballet for orchestra
- 1953? Entre deux guerres, film score
- 1954 L'aigle des rues, suite for Piano
- 1954 Fugue for Orchestra
- 1954 Charlie valse, for piano
- 1954 Deux pièces, for piano
- 1955 Une rouille à l'arsenic, for voice and piano (French texts by Denise Centore)
- 1955 La rue Chagrin, for voice and piano
- 1955 Du style galant au style méchant, 4 Opéras de poche
  - Le bel ambitieux, chamber opera
  - La fille d'opéra, chamber Opera
  - Monsieur Petitpois achète un château, chamber opera
  - La pauvre Eugénie, chamber opera
- 1955 Ici la voix, radio music for orchestra
- 1955 C'est facile à dire, for voice and piano (French Text)
- 1955 Déjeuner sur l'herbe, for voice and piano (French Text by Claude Marcy)
- 1955 L'enfant, for voice and piano (French Text by Claude Marcy)
- 1955 Il avait une barbe noire, for voice and piano (French Text by Claude Marcy)
- 1956 Concerto des vaines paroles, for baritone, piano, and orchestra (French text by Jean Tardieu)
- 1956 L'homme notre ami, film music
- 1956 Le travail fait le patron, film music
- 1957 Les plus beau jours, film music
- 1957 Histoires secrètes, radio score
- 1957 Petite suite, for orchestra
- 1957 La petite sirène, opera (French text by Philippe Soupault)
- 1957 Sonata for Solo Clarinet
- 1957 Adalbert, radio score
- 1957 Sonata for Harp
- 1957 Toccata pour deux pianos
- 1957 Partita for Piano
- 1957 Tante chinoise et les autres, film score for string and wind players
- 1959 Mémoires d'une bergère, radio score
- 1959 Le maître, chamber opera (French text by Eugène Ionesco)
- 1959 Pancarte pour une porte d'entrée, for voice and piano (French texts by Robert Pinget)

=== 1960s and Later ===
- 1960 Temps de pose, radio score
- 1960 Les requins sur nos côtes, film music
- 1960 La rentrée des foins, television score
- 1961 Les grandes personnes (English title – Time out for Love/The Adults), film music
- 1962 Au paradis avec les ânes, radio score (French text by Francis Jammes)
- 1962 Partita for Oboe, Clarinet, Bassoon, and Strings
- 1963 L'adieu du cavalier, in memoriam Francis Poulenc for voice and piano (French text by Guillaume Apollinaire)
- 1964 Sans merveille, television score
- 1964? Concerto for Two Guitars and Orchestra
- 1964 Hommage à Rameau, for two pianos and four percussion
- 1964 Évariste Galois ou l'Éloge des mathématiques, television score
- 1964 Sonata alla Scarlatti, for harp
- 1966 Anatole, television score
- 1969 Entonnement, for oboe, harp, piano, and strings
- 1969 Jacasseries, for flute, oboe, clarinet, cello, harp, and strings
- 1969 Amertume, for flute, oboe, clarinet, French horn, harp, and strings
- 1969 Angoise, for chamber orchestra
- 1970 Impressionnisme, for flute, two pianos, and double bass; film score
- 1972 Forlane, for flute and piano
- 1972 Barbizon, for piano
- 1972 Sonate champêtre, for oboe, clarinet, bassoon, and piano
- 1973 Rondo, for oboe and piano
- 1973 Arabesque, for clarinet and piano
- 1973 Choral, for trumpet and piano
- 1973 Sonatine, for violin and piano
- 1973 Gaillarde, for trumpet and piano
- 1974 Sonate, for two pianos
- 1974–75 Sonate, for piano four hands
- 1974–75 Symphonietta, for trumpet, timpani, and strings
- 1975–1981 Enfantines, for piano
- 1975 Singeries, for piano
- 1975 Escarpolète, for piano
- 1975 Menuet, for oboe (clarinet or saxophone) and piano
- 1975 Allegretto, for three clarinets (three trumpets or three saxophones) and piano
- 1975 Pièmont des Pirénées françaises, film music
- 1975–78 Trois sonatines, for piano
- 1976 Marche, for concert band (orch. Dondeyne)
- 1976 Choral et fugue, for concert band (orch. Wehage)
- 1976–77 Sérénade en la mineur, for four winds and piano or harpsichord
- 1977 Nocturne, for organ
- 1977 Aube, for soprano solo, French horn, and piano
- 1977 Trois chansons de Jean Tardieu, for voice and piano (French text by Jean Tardieu)
- 1977 Un bateau en chocolat, for voice and piano (French text by Jean Tardieu)
- 1977 Suite divertimento, for piano or concert band
- 1978 Trio for violin, cello, and piano
- 1979 Choral et variations, for two pianos or orchestra
- 1979 Choral et deux variations, for woodwind or brass quintet
- 1979 Menuet en fa, for oboe, clarinet, bassoon, and piano
- 1979 Sarabande, for two instruments or piano
- 1980 Suite burlesque, for piano 4 hands
- 1981 Concerto de la fidelité, for high voice and orchestra
- 1982 Vingt leçons de solfège, for voice and piano
- ???? Guitare for solo guitar
