= Claire Brook =

American music editor, writer and composer (1925–2012)

Claire Brook (1925 – 8 June 2012) was an American music editor, writer and composer who shaped English-language music publishing for more than two decades as vice-president and music editor at W. W. Norton.

== Early life and education ==
Brook was born in New York City in 1925 to Russian-Jewish immigrant parents. She attended the High School of Music & Art, earned a bachelor's degree from Queens College (CUNY) and an M.A. in music from Columbia University.

== Career ==
Brook joined the new Répertoire International de Littérature Musicale (RILM) Abstracts as managing editor in 1968 and served until 1969. She moved to W. W. Norton & Company in 1969 as associate music editor, became music editor in 1973 and, in 1979, vice-president, a post she held until retiring in 1992.

In 1975, Brook co-authored, with Elaine Brody, The Music Guide to Austria and Germany (Dodd, Mead, 1975), a reference for music-minded travellers.

After leaving Norton, Brook served as executive editor of Pendragon Press, the specialist publisher she had founded with her husband Barry S. Brook in 1972, and sat on boards of RILM, the Tannery Pond Concerts and the Brook Center, for which she directed the French Opera in the 17th and 18th Centuries facsimile series. Although best known as an editor, Brook continued to compose: manuscripts of her songs are held in the Alice Swanson Esty Papers at Bates College alongside works by Francis Poulenc, Virgil Thomson and Ned Rorem.

== Honours ==
Brook was awarded an honorary Doctor of Music degree by the New England Conservatory in 1999. The Barry S. Brook Center established the Claire Brook Award in 2018 to recognise outstanding scholarship aligned with the centre's research projects.

== Personal life ==
Brook married the musicologist Barry S. Brook in 1958; they remained together until his death in 1997. She divided her time between New York City and Hillsdale, New York, and was a member of organisations including the Century Association. Brook died in New York on 8 June 2012, aged 87.
