= Oakland Cemetery (Sag Harbor, New York) =

Cemetery in Suffolk County, New York

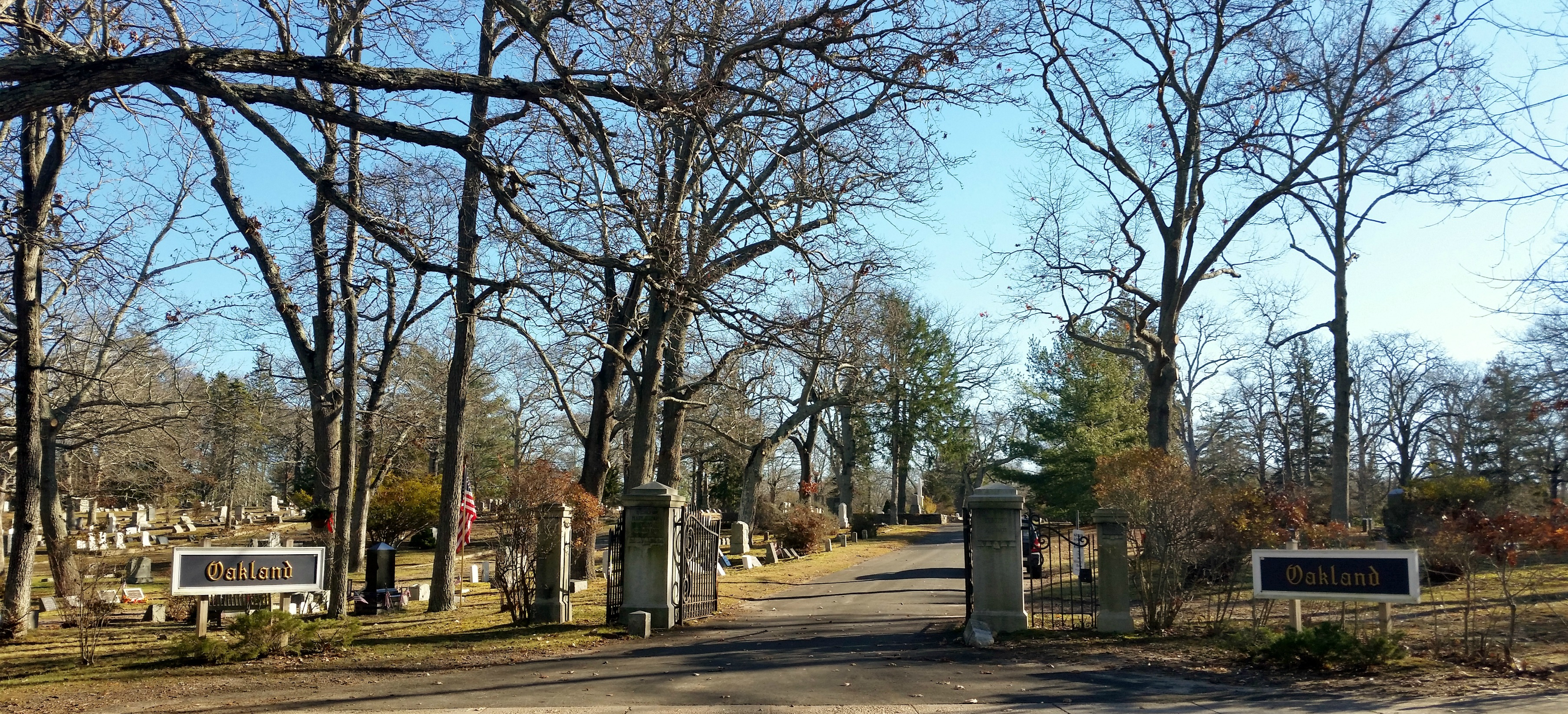
- Entrance to the Sag Harbor Cemetery along Jermain Avenue as seen in December 2015.
- Interactive map of Oakland Cemetery

Details
- Established: 1840
- Location: Sag Harbor, NY
- Country: United States
- Coordinates: 40°59′33″N 72°17′37″W
- Type: Public
- Size: 37 acres (15 ha)
- Find a Grave: Oakland Cemetery
- The Political Graveyard: Oakland Cemetery
- Oakland Cemetery
- U.S. Historic district – Contributing property
- Part of: Sag Harbor Village District (ID94000400)
- Added to NRHP: May 10, 1994

Oakland Cemetery is a public, not-for-profit cemetery located in the village Sag Harbor, New York. It was founded in 1840 and currently sits on 26 acres bounded by Jermain Ave to the north, Suffolk St to the east, and Joels Ln to the west. It is the permanent resting place of over 4,000 people, including more 18th and 19th century sea captains than in any other Long Island cemetery. It was incorporated in 1884.

== History ==
Prior to the opening of Oakland Cemetery in 1840, Sag Harbor's most notable cemetery was the Old Burial Ground, opened in 1767 on the corner of Union and Madison Streets next to the First Presbyterian Church. At total of 17 veterans of the American Revolution and one representative to the New York Provincial Congress of 1775 are buried there. Unfortunately, years of neglect left the Old Burial Ground in a state of disrepair.

In 1840 Oakland Cemetery was founded, covering just 4 acres, enclosed with stone posts and chestnut pickets. One-hundred-thirty-nine graves from the Old Burial Ground were moved to Oakland Cemetery, including Ebenezer Sage and Captain David Hand and his five wives.

During the mid-1800s, in the center of the property which is now Oakland Cemetery, sat of a group of buildings known as Oakland Works. John Sherry had them built in 1850 to house his brass foundry. He soon took on a partner, Ephraim N. Byram, a clock maker and astronomer who was later buried in the cemetery. They enlarged the building to make room for Byram’s clock manufactory and named the place the Oakland Brass Foundry and Clock Works. The business was in operation for 12 years.

In 1863 the building was leased to Abraham DeBevoise and B. & F. Lyon for use as a stocking factory. In 1865 a second building and another bleach house were added to the property. This business closed after three years.

Over the next ten years two other industries occupied the Oakland Works. First, a barrel-head and stave factory owned by George Bush; then, a Morocco leather business owned by Morgan Topping. Both proved unsuccessful.

A final attempt to operate a business on the site was made in 1880 when Edward Chapman Rogers opened the Oakland Hat Manufactory. This venture also failed.

In 1882, unoccupied for almost two years, the old wooden structures caught fire and burned to the ground. The site was purchased by Joseph Fahys and Stephen French and donated to the cemetery.

In September 1884 the Oakland Cemetery Association purchased the remaining Oakland Works property for $400, adding a third section and extending the cemetery east to its present boundary at Suffolk St for a total of ten acres.

In October 1903 the Ladies Village Improvement Society unveiled a new memorial gate

== Notable monuments ==
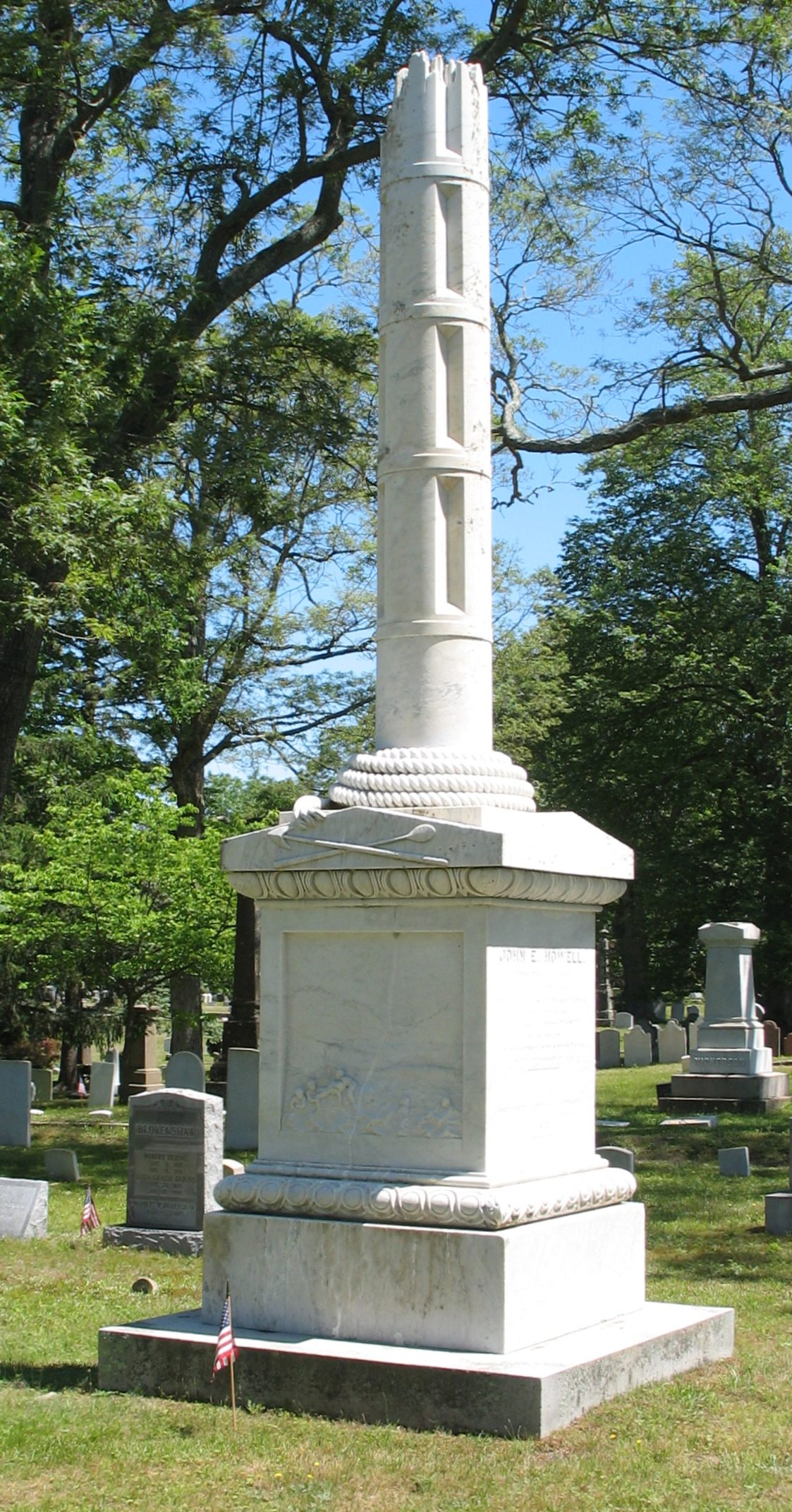
The Broken Mast Monument which commemorates all the whalers who were lost at sea

The Broken Mast Monument in Oakland Cemetery, sculpted by Robert Eberhard Launitz, commemorates those "Who periled their lives in a daring profession and perished in actual encounter with the monsters of the deep."

== Notable burials ==
- Shana Alexander, journalist
- Nelson Algren, author
- Stephen Antonakos, sculptor
- George Balanchine, ballet choreographer and co-founder of the New York City Ballet
- Henry Billings, artist
- Marion Barbara "Joe" Carstairs, heiress and power boat driver
- Henry Francis Cook, U.S. manufacturer and financier
- Alexandra Danilova, ballerina
- Phil Dusenberry, American advertising executive
- Caldwell Edwards, US Representative from Montana
- Joseph Fahys, watch case and silverware manufacturer
- Manucher Mirza Farman Farmaian
- Clay Felker, magazine editor and journalist
- Robert Fizdale, pianist
- Hermine Freed, painter and video artist
- James Ingo Freed, architect
- William Gaddis, author
- Arthur Gold, pianist
- Spalding Gray, author and performance artist
- Richard Holbrooke, US diplomat, editor, author
- Heyward Isham, US Ambassador
- Max Lerner, journalist
- Gordon Matta-Clark, artist
- David Maysles, documentary filmmaker
- Prentice Mulford, author and humorist
- Hans Namuth, photographer
- John F. Osborne, editor and journalist
- Robert Parrish, American film director, editor, writer, and child actor
- Anna Pump, chef, author
- Ebenezer Sage US Representative from New York
- James Salter, author
- Jawn Sandifer, American civil rights attorney, judge and New York State Supreme Court Justice
- Herbert Scarf, mathematician
- Charles P Sifton, US federal judge
- Robert Sklar, American film historian
- Richard Henry Stoddard, critic, poet
- Daisy Tapley, Contralto, Vaudeville performer of the early Harlem Renaissance
- Val Telberg, artist
- Lanford Wilson, playwright

Lorimer Stoddard	Spalding Gray	Prentice Mulford	Alexandra Danilova	Capt. Havens	Capt. Howell	Samuel Huntting

== See also ==
List of cemeteries in the United States
