= Eleven Songs =

Eleven Songs may refer to:

- Eleven Songs (album), a 1999 compilation album by As Friends Rust
- Eleven Songs, a 2001 album by Regina Hexaphone
- Eleven Songs, a 2008 album by Luka Bloom
- Eleven Songs and Two Harmonizations, a 1968 composition by Charles Ives
- Eleven Songs from A Shropshire Lad, a song cycle by George Butterworth (1885-1916)

== See also ==
- "Eleven Sons", a short story by Franz Kafka
- Pancarte pour une porte d'entrée (Tailleferre), sometimes erroneously called Eleven Songs
