= Sonata for Two Pianos =

Sonata for Two Pianos may refer to:

- Sonata for Two Pianos and Percussion (Bartok)
- Sonata for Two Pianos (Goeyvaerts)
- Sonata for Two Pianos (Mozart)
- Sonata for Two Pianos (Stravinsky)
- Sonata for Two Pianos (Tailleferre)

== See also ==
- List of compositions for piano duo
