= Henry Francis Cook =

American manufacturer and financier

Henry Francis Cook (September 11, 1855 – June 12, 1932) was a US manufacturer and financier. He was born in Brooklyn, New York. Cook was president of the Montauk Steamboat Company, the Sag Harbor Real Estate Company, and the Sag Harbor Water Company. He was vice-president of the Peconic Bank of Sag Harbor, secretary and treasurer of the Sag Harbor Heating and Lighting Company, and a partner in the Fahys Watch Case Company. He was a member of the Sons of the Revolution, Society of Colonial Wars, Pilgrims Society, Chamber of Commerce of the State of New York, Brooklyn Institute of Arts and Sciences, and the Union League Club. In 1883, he married Lena Marianne Fahys (1871–1936), the daughter of Joseph Fahys. Their children were Edith Eloise, Joseph Fahys, Madeline Huntting, Henry Cook (Harry), Francis Howell and Maria Fahys.
