= The Old Tune =

The Old Tune is a free translation of Robert Pinget’s 1960 play La Manivelle (The Crank) in which Samuel Beckett transformed Pinget's Parisians, Toupin and Pommard into Dubliners, Cream and Gorman. Its first radio broadcast was by the BBC Third Programme on 23 August 1960, directed by Barbara Bray with Jack MacGowran as Cream and Patrick Magee as Gorman.

For the unspecified old tune played by Gorman on the barrel organ Beckett selected The Bluebells of Scotland, suggested by the bank of bluebells mentioned near the start of the play.

== Background ==
In 1957, Pinget, who at the time was close friends with Beckett, undertook a translation of Beckett's radio play All That Fall, which found Beckett's approval. In 1960 Pinget's play Lettre Morte was presented on a double bill with Krapp's Last Tape at the Théâtre Récamier in Paris.

When Randolph Goodman interviewed the French playwright in 1967, Pinget explained that Beckett

“offered to put my play into English. As he only translates his own material, I considered his offer a great kindness. Beckett wanted to set the scene of the play in Dublin and turn my Parisians into Irishmen; I gave him my permission to do so. It is a model translation.”

This was not too much of a stretch as Pinget's original was written in “highly colloquial French” in the first place. Beckett already admired Pinget's work – he had, for example, insisted that his friends. the Reaveys attend a performance of the French production on which he had been working – and “used to cite this play as an illustration of how important the proper use of music could be to a playwright, especially one who was cognizant of the importance of unifying the two disciples.”

“By transforming the French into Irish rhythmic prose, Beckett went beyond translation to make the play his own, although it is less elusive than the drama which constitutes his fully original work. It is easy to see what attracted him to the text, two men on the margins of society, facing isolation and semantic memory loss, which disrupts communication.”

== Synopsis ==
The play opens to the sound of street noises. An old organ grinder, Gorman, is having a fight with his equally dilapidated barrel organ. It plays for a bit, he thumps it; it plays a few bars more and then it gives up the ghost. He curses, fiddles with the workings and gets a bit more life out of it. As he manages this, he hears another's voice calling him. It is his old friend, Cream, whom he has not seen in years. Cream, a widower, had been living with one of his daughters, Daisy, but since her death, he has moved in with the other, Bertha. Gorman's wife is still alive. Both men are in their seventies: Gorman, by far the more inquisitive of the two, is seventy-three; Cream is seventy-six.

The roar of an engine butts into their conversation, the first of many to come. They both bemoan the youth of today and remember a time before cars. Gorman remembers “barouches”. Cream recalls “broughams”. They can't agree over the make of the first car they actually did see: Gorman thinks it was a “Pic-Pic” but Cream insists it was a “Dee Dyan Button”. Each man extols his recollected details with utter conviction. They do, however, manage to agree upon the owner of the said vehicle, a vintner called Bush.

The effect of modern life on the environment takes the men back to a particularly hot summer in 1895. Gorman talks about watering the roof with a garden hose but Cream insists a hose would have been a luxury item until after World War I. Gorman accedes, acknowledging that his family didn't even having running water until 1925. They move onto the condition of modern gardens especially the prevalent trend for erecting gazebos, the build quality of which they both find to be questionable.

Cream proposes they have a smoke, but can't find his cigarettes, accuses his daughter of going through his pockets, then comes across the packet. Neither man has a light however. They try to catch the eye of a passer-by but with no joy. Gorman asks Cream if he remembers the “black shag” they used to get when they were in the armed forces. He does. Predictably they begin to reminisce about the War.

Gorman says he enlisted in 1906 with “The Foot” at Chatham. He calls to mind a public house called Morrison's. Cream says he must be mistaken, it was Caterham and the pub was Harrison's Oak Lounge; he is doubly sure of this because he used to take his wife there on holiday. Gorman gives way on the pub's name but is still convinced it was Chatham. Cream refuses to cave, insisting that “The Gunners” were billeted at Chatham. The two become muddled. Cream is sure that Gorman is thinking about the mobilization. It that were the case the place name would be Chester which is where Morrison's pub seemingly was.

- By “The Foot”, Gorman may mean, the Irish Guards, one of the regiments of foot guards in the British Army.
- The “Gunners” could refer to The Royal Artillery.
- There has been a Naval Barracks in Chatham since 1588
- From 1877 Caterham Barracks was a depot for the foot guards regiments.
- Dale Barracks, Chester is a purpose-built Infantry Barracks.

They are both more alone than they want to admit, struggling to remember, fighting to find common ground and yet even when they seem to it turns into a new battlefield for these two but they keep soldiering on.

Gorman becomes nostalgic for the War: “[A]h those are happy memories.” Clearly Cream's remembrances are not as ‘rose tinted’ though but he won't even give in on this generality.

The roar of an engine distracts them and the next thing he knows Gorman has changed the subject: he is asking after Cream's son, who is a judge. The judge, it turns out, is plagued by rheumatism, which in Gorman's opinion is an hereditary disease. Cream can't agree saying that personally he has never been troubled by it. From all accounts Gorman is thinking about his own mother, even though he is doesn't actually suffer himself either; his assertions are mere opinion presented as fact. He wonders though about a society that can build “atom rockets” and yet has still to discover a cure for rheumatic disorders.

He notes that Cream's son has been in the newspapers recently concerning the “Carlton affair”. Cream corrects him. It was the “Barton affair.” Gorman is not convinced. He insists: “The Carlton affair, Mr Cream, the sex fiend, on the Assizes.” Cream says his son works for the Circuit Court – which deals with civil, rather than criminal, cases – and tries to think of the name of the judge who has been presiding over this high-profile case but can't. Gorman obviously is not well informed on legal issues and admits it; his only experience of judicial matters has been to witnesses his niece's divorce proceedings some thirty years earlier.

They begin to talk about families. Cream's grandson, Herbert – the judge's son – died in infancy; his daughter has two daughters of her own though. It's at this point Gorman learns that Cream's wife has been dead for twenty years. Gorman gets confused about the names of Cream's daughters, Daisy and Bertha, and where Bertha and her husband live. Gorman thinks they live near the slaughterhouse but Cream says Gorman must be thinking of the man's brother, the nurseryman. This contradicts what he himself said earlier when he referred to Bertha's husband, a man called Moody, as a nurseryman. He also now states she has two sons, one of which he calls Hubert confusing the boy with Herbert the boy his son, the judge, lost in infancy. He can't remember the name of his other grandson.

Footsteps approach and Gorman tries to get them a light, unsuccessfully again.

The conversation shifts onto financial matters. Gorman has always believed that Cream's daughter, whom he mistakenly calls his daughter-in-law, had “private means” but it seems not; despite advise to invest in land, all the money had been put into the bank and lost during the War. Cream jokes that one day people will be building on the moon, which causes Gorman to wonder if Cream is “against progress.” He says not but thinks it lunacy to waste resources on the moon and can envisage nations fighting over it in years to come.

For some reason this reminds Cream of his father. Gorman says he knew him to be a straight-talking man. He tries to remember when the man sat on the town council and plumps for 1895, “the year of the great frost”. Cream corrects him, it was 1893, the year he'd just turned ten. Gorman doesn't object and proceeds with his recollection of the time Cream's father “went hell for leather for the mayor”, a man called Overend, which he now asserts was in April 1896 despite Cream insisting that his father didn't join the council till January 1897. Gorman then says that the event he was referring to must have been instigated by another person altogether. It transpires the incident didn't involve the mayor at all; rather it was something to do with a local butcher, Oscar Bliss.

This causes the men to reminisce over people they used to know in the past: Helen Bliss, the butcher's daughter; Rosie Plumpton, now deceased; Molly Berry; Eva Hart, whose brother married Gertie Crumplin who, in her day, had been a “great one for the lads”; Nelly Crowther, the daughter of Simon and Mary, who died in an explosion in a car along which injured a soldier, John Fitzball; John's aunt, “the high and mighty” Miss Hester, and her niece, Miss Victoria, who was due to marry an American and who had a brother – the aforementioned John – who died of injuries sustained from the explosion a year or two later.

Throughout their conversation the roar of engines has continually interrupted them. Cream has had enough and prepares to go, aware that he's keeping Gorman from his work. Gorman persuades him to stay and starts looking for his cigarettes. Cream says he should start his barrel organ again which he does. For a few moments it fights with the street noise and then rises triumphantly at the end of the play.

== Interpretation ==
Beckett draws heavily on the stylized language of John Millington Synge, who had a similar upbringing to his, and the verbal excesses of Seán O'Casey, whose background could hardly have been different, to transform Pinget's original work into a pastiche, if not a parody of the whole Irish comic tradition of linguistic stereotyping; the Irishman as caricature.

In 1934, Beckett, in a review of O’Casey's Windfalls, which includes two one-act plays, writes:

“Mr O’Casey is a master of knockabout in this very serious and honorable sense – that he discerns the principle of disintegration in even the most complacent solidities, and activates it to their explosion."

Gorman and Cream's worlds are crumbling around them just as their pasts and memories are doing. Their speech is colloquial, their outlook parochial. The modern world is passing them by – literally – motor vehicles and the young on the street. Despite Beckett's conscious efforts to Gaelicise the work the themes at its core are universal. Gorman's line, “You had to work for your living in those days, it wasn't at six you knocked off, nor at seven neither, eight it was, eight o’clock, yes by God,” could be slipped almost unnoticed into the Four Yorkshiremen sketch – made famous by Monty Python – or just as easily Neil Simon’s The Sunshine Boys.

There is a clear contrast between O’Casey's linguistic pyrotechnics and the limited, impoverished lives of the characters that utter his rich hyperbole; the result is both comic and tragic but it is clear that Beckett is in his debt. There is a touch of personal nostalgia here too: Beckett makes specific reference to the "Dee Dyan Button," the first car that Cream and Gorman ever saw, which was actually the De Dion-Bouton; Beckett's father was the first to own one in Ireland. It is the kind of detail Mercier and Camier could easily have squabbled about on their trek through and round about Dublin.

Critics tend to by-pass the piece, treating it as Beckett-lite, which in many ways it is, but it also demonstrates something of a nostalgic looking-back from Beckett's own point of view, not simply to the Dublin he once knew but to a style of writing that he would never return to again after this year, 1960, the same year he completed his own Happy Days.

If ever John Donne had in mind some specific “emergent occasion” then this was probably the last thing he would have thought of: two men, each waiting for their own particular “bell [to] toll”, each “an island, entire of itself” shouting across the strait to another man on another island barely able to hear a word the other is saying.

== Stage productions ==
The play was adapted to the stage shortly after publication in Evergreen Review 5.17, (March–April 1961) and first presented off-Broadway at the Royal Playhouse, New York City on 23 March 1961, directed by Steve Chernak with Sly Travers (Gorman) and Jack Delmonte (Cream).

The play was not well received, apart from a review in The Village Voice by John Talmer:

"The daily critics have put it down and so I suppose it shall die, but The Old Tune, by Robert Pinget in a translation-adaptation by Samuel Beckett – more Beckett than Pinget I hazard – is a telling if slender piece of work. Death becomes it well: its subject matter is ageing and death, desuetude and deliquescence. But also memory and fondness, loving and nostalgia – and the foolish-fondness of old men straining with weak memories, full of error, for the pictures and pleasures of the past."

The play did not die, however.

- Pinget's original La Manivelle opened at the Théâtre de la Comédie, Paris. George Peyrou directed Georges Ader and Henry de Livry.
- In 1964 Beckett's adaptation opened at the avant-garde Judson Poets’ Theater, New York. Peter Feldman directed Jerry Trichter and Sean O’Ceallaigh.
- The British stage version opened on 22 November 1964 at the Mercury Theatre, Notting Hill Gate. Alan Simpson directed Godfrey Quigley and Gerry Duggan.
- A version was presented on 5 January 1965 at the Traverse Theatre, Edinburgh with Leonard Maguire as Gorman and Declan Mulholland as Cream, directed by Michael Geliot.
- And the play was still going strong twenty-two years later. “When [Stan] Gontarski staged it at the Magic Theatre, San Francisco ... in 1986, Beckett reminded him:

“Be sure Pinget gets full & visible credit. The Old Tune his vision not mine.”
