= Fizdale =

Fizdale is a surname. Notable people with the surname include:

- David Fizdale (born 1974), American basketball coach
- Robert Fizdale (1920–1995), half of Gold and Fizdale, American two-piano ensemble, authors and television cooking show hosts
