= Marek Kędzierski =

Polish writer and theatre director

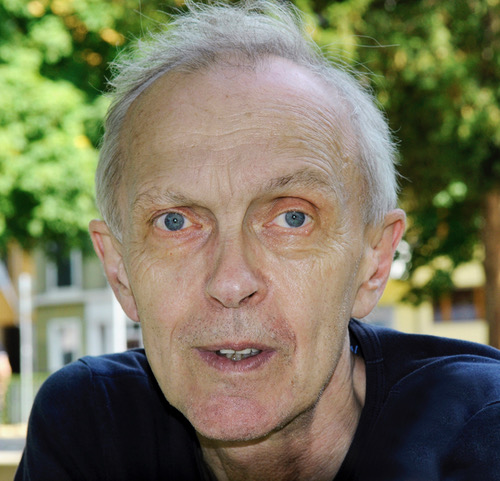
Marek Kedzierski, photo Daria Kolacka

Marek Kedzierski (born September 9, 1953, in Łódź) is a writer, translator, literary critic, theatre director, organizer of international festivals. Author of eight books, a few dozen literary translations and over 150 critical texts. Expert, translator and promoter of works of Samuel Beckett, Thomas Bernhard and Alberto Giacometti, among others.

== Life and education ==
He is the son of a clerk and an office worker and grandson of Captain Antoni Maksymilian Kędzierski (1900–1948), one of the first Legionnaires, a participant of the Resistance in France during World War II. He was born in Łódź, where his parents had found shelter after the fall of the Warsaw Uprising (mother) and the changing of the Polish borders (father), and moved with them to Warsaw in 1956. He studied Polish and Japanese studies from 1968 to 1973 at the University of Warsaw. In 1978, he obtained his doctorate at the University of Warsaw and the Institute of Literary Research of the Polish Academy of Sciences (supervisor Stefan Treugutt). With the reviewer of the PhD thesis, prof. Jan Błoński, he published the first book in Poland on Samuel Beckett. In 1979, he became assistant professor of Literary Theory at the Faculty of Polish language and literature of the University of Warsaw. Since December 1981, he has been living outside Poland – in the US, Germany and France and free-lancing internationally.

He lives in Paris, Nice and Moulinet. He is a member of the Polish PEN-Club.

== Literary and theatrical activities ==
In academic criticism (1979–2008), his main field was oriental literature, modern writers and visual artists of the West, especially Samuel Beckett, Thomas Bernhard, Alberto Giacometti, Francis Bacon, Louise Bourgeois, Harold Pinter, Robert Pinget, and David Mamet. As a translator, he has rendered into Polish works of Samuel Beckett (Watt, Malone Dies, The Unnamable, some other prose texts and Beckett's plays which he produced on stage, including Endgame, Happy Days) and Thomas Bernhard (5 novels), as well as of H. Pinter, R. Pinget, and excerpts of works by writers, artists, philosophers and critics (e.g. M. Walser, D. Rabinovich, A.Giacometti, G. Deleuze, M.Leiris, J. Dupin, D. Sylvester, B. Bray) as well as one novel by the Slovak writer Jana Bénova, Café Hyena (Nisza Publ. Warsaw 2016).

Kedzierski has authored three novels in Polish: ''bezludzie'' (no man's earth) 1995, ''modliszka'' (praying mantis) 1996. ''bez miary'' (no limits) 1997, published in Cracow, and one in English (''lucid intervals blind summits'', Huntington 1994) as well as texts for magazines in English, German (Lettre International), and French (Europe). Since 1996, he has been contributing editor to the journal Kwartalnik Artystyczny in Bydgoszcz/Torun, Poland, for which he has prepared numerous special issues devoted to the aforementioned writers and artists, notably Giacometti, the first Polish book publication on the Swiss sculptor.

Since 2009, a regular contributor for Berlin's "Kulturzeitschrift" Lettre International, he published there long conversations with Barbara Bray, Thomas Bernhard's brother Peter Fabjan, and the internationally acclaimed theatre directors Krzysztof Warlikowski, Romeo Castellucci and Krystian Lupa.

His contributions for German broadcasters (SWF, SWR, Deutschlandradio) 1988–2003 include radio essays, conversations with senior publishers and radio adaptations of Beckett's prose works Company and Watt. He was interviewed in 2016 about his principal interests in a series of broadcasts by Polish Radio Dwojka (2nd programme of the State Radio).

In theatre, after the fall of communism in 1990, he started cooperation with the National Old Theater in Krakow and was, together with Adam Kwaśny and Marek Kalita, one of the founders of the Bücklein Theater, later the Atelier Theater. In the years 1996–2017, he organized and co-organized (in France, Germany, Poland, Switzerland and Sweden) theater festivals and meetings devoted mainly to Beckett's work[5].

As a theatre director, he has staged in Poland (Cracow and Warsaw) works by Beckett, Bernhard, Pinget, Witold Gombrowicz and J.L. Borges, in Germany (Badisches Staatstheater Karlsruhe, Villa Musica Mainz, E-Werk Freiburg), in the U.S.(Push-Push Theater Atlanta), in France (Le Colombier Paris, La Coupole St. Louis), and in Sweden (Helsingborgs Stadsteater).

Kedzierski has organized and co-organized several festivals in Europe and co-ordinated various productions around Beckett which put together plays, readings and adaptations of prose works. Theatre festivals include: journées beckett in Strasbourg 1996, Beckett in Berlin 2000 (with Walter Asmus) at Akademie der Künste and Hebbel-Theater, ''transpositions'' in Cracow 2002 and 2006 at Villa Decius and Laznia Nowa Theatre, Beckett in Zurich at Zürcher Schauspielhaus 2006 (with Thomas Henkeler) as well as fail better: Beckett@111 in 2017 (with Raimund Schall) in Freiburg, Germany and Trondheim, Norway.

== Focus on Samuel Beckett, Barbara Bray, Thomas Bernhard ==
After meeting Beckett in 1981, he maintained contact with him throughout the 80's – the playwright invited him to attend his rehearsals and co-adapted the text of ''Company'' for radio. Kedzierski describes his meetings with Beckett in his text Brushes, the first part of which was published in Holland in 2016.

After the Irish playwright's death, Kedzierski befriended Barbara Bray, a BBC radio producer, critic and translator who had played a major role in Beckett's intellectual and private life. Kedzierski helped Bray write a personal memoir of Beckett, unfinished due to her death in 2010. Kedzierski's conversations with Bray, recorded from 2003 to 2009, have been translated into several languages, though they remain unpublished in the original English. Bray remained largely unknown until the publication of vol 3 & 4 of The Letters of Samuel Beckett which reveals that she was his principal correspondent from 1958 until 1978.

In 2013, Kedzierski, together with the Paris-based photographer/film maker Piotr Dzumala produced a 50 min. documentary on Barbara Bray, Rue Samuel Beckett, first shown in 2013 at the Happy Days International Festival, Enniskillen, N.Ireland.

In addition to Beckett, Kedzierski has fostered the work of the Austrian writer Thomas Bernhard in Poland. He compiled two Bernhard issues of Kwartalnik Artystyczny in 2009 and translated five of his novels. He interviewed Bernhard's literary executor and half-brother, Peter Fabjan in 2008. During the interview they had a serious car accident which Kedzierski described in his prose text Aurach.

== Books published ==
- Samuel Beckett (co-author Jan Błoński) Czytelnik Publishers, Warsaw 1983, ISBN 978-83-07-00687-1
- Samuel Beckett, Wiedza Powszechna Publishers, Warsaw 1990, ISBN 978-83-214-0722-7
- lucid intervals blind summits (a novel) University Editions, Huntington, USA 1994, ISBN 978-1-56002-165-0
- bezludzie (a novel) Oficyna Literacka Publishers, Cracow 1994, ISBN 978-83-7124-016-4
- modliszka (a novel) Oficyna Literacka, Cracow 1995, ISBN 978-83-7124-018-8
- bez miary (a novel) Oficyna Literacka, Cracow 1997, ISBN 978-83-7124-072-0
- Giacometti, Kwartalnik Artystyczny 88, 2013, ISSN 1232-2105
- Pułapka Becketta (co-author Krzysztof Myszkowski), Biblioteka „Kwartalnika Artystycznego", Bydgoszcz 2020, ISBN 978-83-65533-89-0

== Theatre works ==
=== Stage directing ===
- Samuel Beckett Watt, Bucklein Theatre, Cracow 1994 (in Polish)
- Samuel Beckett Endgame, Bucklein Theatre, Cracow 1995 (in Polish)
- Samuel Beckett Not I, Play Bucklein Theatre, Cracow 1997 (in Polish)
- Marek Kedzierski Halftruths , Teatr Atelier, Cracow 1998 (in Polish)
- Thomas Bernhard Contra Heidegger, Teatr Atelier Cracow, Teatr Rozmaitości Warsaw 1999–2003 (in Polish)
- Robert Pinget The Inquisitory, Teatr Atelier Cracow 1999 (in Polish)
- Samuel Beckett Happy Days Stary /National/ Theatre Cracow 2002 (in Polish)
- Robert Pinget The Hypothesis, Teatr Atelier Cracow 2003 (in Polish)
- Witold Gombrowicz Auf eigene Faust (Diary) Badisches Staatstheater, Karlsruhe 2005 (in German)
- Samuel Beckett Endgame PushPush Theater, Atlanta 2006 (in English)
- Samuel Beckett Quelques mots sur le silence (triple bill: Pas moi, L'innommable, Comédie) Chat borgne théatre, Strasbourg 2006Théâtre de la Coupole a St.Louis, Anis GRAS, Arcueil (Paris) 2007, Le Colombier (Paris) 2008 (in French)
- Mesias Maiguashca La Celda (The Cell) by J.L. Borges, Teatr Centralny Basen Artystyczny, mini-opera staged for Warsaw Autumn Contemporary Music Festival 2008 (in Spanish)
- Thomas Bernhard I Tredje person, parts of three novels by Bernhard presented on stage, Helsingbors Stadsteater 2010 (in Swedish)
- “Wäre ich der Steinway…" Thomas Bernhard – Das Ganze Theater mit Klavier ("Were I but the Steinway…" Thomas Bernhard – Making a scene with the piano. Piano performance, theatre, electronic audio. With Martin Schwab (Burgtheater, Vienna, in German) and Klaus Steffes-Holländer (Freiburg), neue music works composed by Alwynne Pritchard (Bergen), Kirsten Reese (Berlin). Premiered at Villa Musica in Mainz June 2014. Broadcast by Südwestrundfunk SWR 2 in October 2014 (in German and English)
- Samuel Beckett Nicht Ich (Not I), Zerberus Theater, E-Werk Freiburg 2017 (in German)
- Samuel Beckett Non io (Not I) – fail better : E-Werk Freiburg 2017 (in Italian)
- Samuel Beckett Katastrophe (Catastrophe): E-Werk Freiburg 2017 (in German)

== Bibliography ==
- Hanna Borawska (2017), "Kwartalnik Artystyczny. Bibliografia 1993–2017". Kwartalnik Artystyczny 4 (96) – addition.
- Ewa Brzeska (2018), "Beckett w Polsce". Tekstualia 4 (55).
- Jacek Cieślak (2021), "Depresja i światło", Teatr 3.
- Marek Kędzierski, Beckett i duch Bernharda – Polish Radio Dwojka
- Marek Kędzierski, Krzysztof Myszkowski (2020), Pułapka Becketta, Biblioteka „Kwartalnika Artystycznego", Bydgoszcz 2020.
- http://www.kwartalnik.art.pl/
- Suche | Lettre – Europas Kulturzeitung
