= Barbara Bray =

English translator and critic (1924–2010)

- Born: Barbara Jacobs; November 24, 1924; Maida Vale, London, England
- Died: February 25, 2010 (aged 85); Edinburgh, Scotland
- Education: Girton College, Cambridge
- Occupations: Translator; critic; script editor
- Spouse: John Bray (d. 1958)
- Writing career
- Language: English; French; Italian
- Years active: 1953–2010
- Genre: Literary criticism,
- Notable awards: PEN Translation Prize (1986)

Barbara Bray (née Jacobs; 24 November 1924 – 25 February 2010) was an English translator and critic.

== Early life ==
Bray was born in Maida Vale, London; her father had Belgian and Jewish origins. An identical twin (her sister Olive Classe was also a translator), she was educated at Girton College, Cambridge, where she read English, with papers in French and Italian and gained a First. She married John Bray, an Australian-born RAF pilot, after the couple graduated from Cambridge, and had two daughters, Francesca and Julia. In 1958, Bray's husband died in an accident in Cyprus.

== Career ==
Bray became a script editor in 1953 for the BBC Third Programme, commissioning and translating European 20th-century avant-garde writing for the network. Harold Pinter wrote some of his earliest work at Bray's insistence.

From 1961, Bray lived in Paris and established a career as a translator and critic. She translated the correspondence of George Sand, and work by leading French-speaking writers of her own time including Marguerite Duras, Amin Maalouf, Julia Kristeva, Emmanuel Le Roy Ladurie, Michel Quint, Jean Anouilh, Michel Tournier, Jean Genet, Alain Bosquet, Réjean Ducharme, Élisabeth Roudinesco, and Philippe Sollers. She received the PEN Translation Prize in 1986.

Bray collaborated with the film director Joseph Losey on the screenplay for Galileo (1975), which was an adaptation of the play by Bertolt Brecht. During the same decade, they collaborated on the script for a biographical film about Ibn Sa'ud, the founder of Saudi Arabia and (with Harold Pinter), she wrote an adaptation of Proust's Remembrance of Things Past.

Bray also worked extensively with Samuel Beckett, developing a professional as well as personal relationship that continued for the rest of his life. Bray was one of the few people with whom the playwright discussed his work.

Bray suffered a stroke at the end of 2003. In late 2009, she moved to a nursing home in Edinburgh.

In spite of her serious disability she worked until shortly before her death on her memoir of Beckett, Let Mortals Rejoice..., which she was unable to complete. Her reflections on Beckett, both as a writer and as a person, became part of a series of conversations with her Polish friend Marek Kedzierski, recorded from 2004 to 2009. Extensive excerpts from these conversations were published in German by Berlin's quarterly Lettre international (Es war wie ein Blitz… vol. 87, Winter 2009) and in French by the magazine Europe (C´était comme un éclair, un éclair aveuglant, no. 974/975 Juin-Juillet 2010), as well as in Polish, Slovak and Swedish. The English original of these excerpts remains unpublished, but other fragments have appeared in Modernism/modernity (Barbara Bray: In Her Own Words, Volume 18, Number 4, November 2011).

A biography by the French Beckett and translation scholar Pascale Sardin, Barbara Bray, A Woman of Letters: Translator, Radio Producer, Scriptwriter, Critic, and Theatre Director(Routledge) came out in 2024.

== Selected bibliography ==
=== Translations ===
- Céleste Albaret and Georges Belmont: Monsieur Proust
- Jean Anouilh: Antigone
- Tahar Ben Jelloun: French Hospitality
- Alain Bosquet: A Russian Mother
- Maryse Condé: Segu
- Réjean Ducharme: The Swallower Swallowed
- Marguerite Duras
  - The Lover
  - The War
  - The Malady of Death
  - Blue Eyes Black Hair
  - Practicalities
  - Summer Rain
  - India Song
  - The Sailor from Gibraltar
  - L'Amante Anglaise
  - Yann Andrea Steiner
  - The Man Sitting in the Corridor
- Flaubert—Sand: The Correspondence [translated with Francis Steegmuller]
- Jean Genet: Prisoner of Love
- Jean Giono: The Man Who Planted Trees
- Amin Maalouf
  - In the Name of Identity: Violence and the Need to Belong
  - Balthasar's Odyssey
- Ismail Kadare
  - The Palace of Dreams [from the French translation by Jusuf Vrioni]
  - The Concert [from the French translation by Jusuf Vrioni]
- Julia Kristeva
  - The Samurai
  - The Old Man and the Wolves
- J. M. G. Le Clézio: Terra Amata
- Jean d'Ormesson: The Glory of the Empire: A Novel, a History
- Robert Pinget
  - Clope
  - Dead Letter
- Michel Quint: In Our Strange Gardens
- Élisabeth Roudinesco: Jacques Lacan: An Outline of a Life and History of a System of Thought. Cambridge, UK: Polity Press. Jacques Lacan, 1999, New York: Columbia University Press, 1997.
- Simone Schwarz-Bart
  - The Bridge of Beyond
  - Between Two Worlds
- Philippe Sollers: Women
- Michel Tournier: The Ogre
- Violet Trefusis: Broderie Anglaise
