= Montauk Steamboat Company =

Defunct American steamship line

The Montauk Steamboat Company, Ltd. was located at Pier 13, East River, New York City, US. It was established in 1853. It operated steamboats between New York City and the eastern end of Long Island. The boats ran along the north shore of Long Island. There were also steamboats to Block Island, Rhode Island where connections were made with Providence and Newport. Henry Francis Cook was its president; David Van Cleaf was its superintendent. The company was sold to the Long Island Rail Road Company in 1899 after a deal was struck with Joseph Fahys & Co. who held the majority stock in the steamboat company. The company office was later moved to Long Island City, Queens, New York.
