= Jawn Sandifer =

American judge

Jawn Ardin Sandifer (June 6, 1914 – September 1, 2006) was an American civil rights attorney, judge and New York State Supreme Court Justice. Sandifer headed the NAACP's New York State branch and was involved in cases, including school segregation. He argued Henderson v. United States (1950) before the U.S. Supreme Court.

== Early life and education ==
Born John Sandifer on June 6, 1914, in Greensboro, North Carolina, he was one of Charles and Nettie Sandifer's nine children. In college, he changed his first name from John to Jawn. Sandifer graduated from Johnson C. Smith University in 1935 and in 1938 he earned his law degree from the Howard University School of Law.

== Career ==
Early in his legal career, Sandifer was dedicated to fighting Jim Crow laws. During World War II, he served in the Army's criminal investigation unit. In 1949, he moved to New York City and opened a private legal practice in Harlem. The same year, he was elected to serve as one of the two lawyers for the New York branch of NAACP, working with Thurgood Marshall. In 1950, while working with the NAACP, he had the opportunity to argue a key discrimination case for the U.S. Supreme Court case, Henderson v. United States.

His judicial career started in 1964, when he was appointed to the civil court bench in New York City by mayor Robert F. Wagner. In 1982, Sandifer won the election for State Supreme Court in Manhattan. He retired in 1992.

=== New York City Sanitation Department case ===
In 1986, there was a case involving a change to the City Sanitation Department entrance exam. The union, Uniformed Sanitationmen's Association, alleged that the most recent entrance test for the job was too easy and "noncompetitive". The older, 1974 version of the entrance test and examination, had involved obstacle courses with scaling eight-foot walls, and was unrelated to the job of hauling garbage. Of 45,000 people who took the 1986 version of the exam, 44,000 earned the highest grade and 1,710 of those were women. Sandifer approved the use of the current version of the entrance exam, siding with the City Sanitation Department in his ruling and allowed the City Sanitation Department to hire its first women.

=== Legal Right to Die case ===
Thomas Wirth, who had AIDS and a brain infection, drafted a living will in April 1987 with his legal guardian. It stated that if he could not be restored to a "meaningful quality of life," he wished to be allowed the right to die "without extraordinary medical measures". In July 1987, Judge Sandifer sided with Bellevue Hospital, the hospital giving life prolonging treatment to Wirth, because it had not been proven that Wirth's brain infection was not treatable. Wirth died in August of the same year, of an AIDS-related brain infection.

== Personal life ==
Sandifer was married to Laura Sandifer until her death in 1993.Together they had a son named Floyd. Sandifer's second wife was Elsa Krueger–Sandifer

Sandifer died at age 92 on September 1, 2016, due to cancer. Sandifer is buried in Oakland Cemetery in Sag Harbor, New York.
