= William Esty =

American advertising executive

William Cole Esty (March 6, 1895 – January 21, 1954) was an American advertising executive and founder of William Esty Co. He was "known far and wide as the man who introduced personality advertising to the business world".

== Early years ==
Esty was born in Urbana, Illinois. His father, William Esty, was a professor at Lehigh University. His mother was Julia Coy Esty, and he had a brother. He graduated from Amherst College in 1916 and in World War I was an enlisted man who became a lieutenant in the 11th Machine Gun Battalion.

== Career ==
Esty was western manager for the Motion Picture News, after which he worked with the Home Sector of New York. He subsequently was with the Butterick Publishing Company and the J. H. Cross Company and was vice president of the Corman Company in New York.

After working at J. Walter Thompson starting in 1925, he started his own agency in 1932, with R.J. Reynolds Tobacco Company as his first client. His wife was performer and patron Alice Swanson Esty.

In 1982, William Esty & Co. was bought by Ted Bates Worldwide, which in turn was acquired by Saatchi & Saatchi in 1986. Two years later, Saatchi & Saatchi merged Esty with Campbell Mithun to become Campbell-Mithun-Esty. They have since dropped the Esty name.

== Personal life and death ==
Esty married Gertrude Wilder in New York City on June 2, 1923, and Alice Stevens in 1936. He had two sons and two daughters. He died at his home in New Canaan, Connecticut, on January 21, 1954, aged 59.
