= Lenore Coral =

American musicologist, ethnomusicologist and administrator

- Born: January 30, 1939; Detroit
- Died: March 8, 2005 (aged 66); Ithaca
- Occupation: Music librarian

Lenore Coral (1939–2005) was an American musicologist and music librarian. She is known for activities with the Music Library Association (MLA) where she served as president from 1987 through 1989, and specifically with her work establishing the International Standard Music Number (ISMN). Coral was born on January 30, 1939, in Detroit, Michigan. She attended the University of Chicago and King's College London, receiving her PhD in 1974. She worked at several university libraries including University of California, Irvine, the Mills Music Library at the University of Wisconsin–Madison, and the Sidney Cox Library for Music and Dance at Cornell University. While at Cornell, Coral founded and became director of the Répertoire International de Littérature Musicale, United States Office.

Coral died in Ithaca, New York on March 8, 2005. In 2007 the festschrift Music, Libraries, and the Academy was published in her honor.
