= RILM Music Encyclopedias =

Collection of music reference works

RILM Music Encyclopedias (RME) is an electronic collection of music reference works from 1775 to the present from Répertoire International de Littérature Musicale. RME expands every year by three to five titles.

RME was launched in December 2015 with 41 titles.

== Scope and contents ==
The earliest RME piece, Jean Jacques Rousseau's Dictionnaire de musique, was published in 1775. RME also contains the first edition of “The Grove”, in an edition published by Theodore Presser in 1895.

The largest number of titles date from 2000 onward. These include Ken Bloom's Broadway, Lol Henderson and Lee Stacey's Encyclopedia of Music in the 20th Century, Peter Matzke et al., Das Gothic- und Dark Wave-Lexikon, and Richard Kostelanetz's Dictionary of the Avant-Gardes. The Handwörterbuch der musikalischen Terminologie, conceived between 1972 and 2006, is also included.

RME also holds The Garland Encyclopedia of World Music and Eileen Southern's Biographical Dictionary of Afro-American and African Musicians.

RME expands annually with additions of four titles in average. One of the titles, Komponisten der Gegenwart (KDG), is being regularly updated with new articles or additions to existing articles.

Stephen Henry mentions RME's

“ability to provide access to some excellent European resources that might otherwise, not be available to libraries with less than comprehensive collections.”

== Functionality ==
RME is accessible on EBSCOhost and RILM's platform Egret.

RME on Egret facilitates automatic translation of content to over 100 languages via Google Translate integration. Users can set up accounts where annotations and notes can be created, saved, and shared, cross references linking related content throughout RME, links to related content in RILM Abstracts of Music Literature and other resources, as well as an interface compatible with mobile and tablet devices.

Librarian Laurie Sampsel asserts that

“cross searching the full text of so many titles yields results impossible (or highly unlikely) to find using the print versions of these encyclopedia's.”

== Title list ==
At Launch (2016)

- Algemene muziekencyclopedie
- Annals of opera
- Band music notes
- Biographical dictionary of Afro-American and African music
- Biographical dictionary of musicians
- Biographical dictionary of Russian/Soviet composers
- Biographie universelle des musiciens
- Biographisch-bibliographisches Quellen-Lexikon
- Das Blasmusik-Lexikon: Komponisten - Autoren - Werke
- Broadway: An encyclopedia
- The Concise Garland encyclopedia of world music
- Conductors and composers of popular orchestral music
- Dictionary of American classical composers
- A dictionary of the avant-gardes
- Dictionnaire de la musique (Les hommes et leurs oeuvres)
- Dictionnaire de la musique (Science de la musique)
- Dictionnaire de musique
- Dictionnaire des oeuvres de l'art vocal
- Dizionario e bibliografia della musica
- Dizionario universale dei musicisti (Schmidl)
- Encyclopedia of American gospel music
- Encyclopedia of Music in the 20th Century
- Encyclopedia of recorded sound
- Encyclopedia of the American theatre organ
- Encyclopedia of the blues
- Garland encyclopedia of world music
- Das Gothic- und Dark Wave-Lexikon
- Großes Sängerlexikon
- Grove I: A Dictionary of music and musicians (1879)
- Handwörterbuch der musikalischen Terminologie
- Historical dictionary of the music and musicians of Finland
- Hollywood songsters: Singers who act and actors
- International encyclopedia of women composers
- Komponisten der Gegenwart
- March music notes
- Pangosmio lexiko
- The Paris opera 1-3
- Percussionists: A biographical dictionary
- Riemanns Musik-Lexikon (11th edition)
- Steirisches Musiklexikon
- Tin Pan Alley: An encyclopedia of the Golden Age

2017 Additions

- Československý hudební slovník osob a institucí
- Encyclopédie de la musique et dictionnaire
- Editori Italiani
- Opernlexikon by Stieger

2018 Additions

- Enciclopédia da música brasileira
- Il melodramma italiano 1861-1900; 1901-1926
- Neues Historisch-biographisches Lexikon der Tonküstler
- The 20th century violin concertante

2019 Additions (theme: musical instruments)

- Diccionario biográfico – bibliográfico – histórico – crítico de guitarras y guitarristas
- Musical instruments: A comprehensive dictionary
- Real-Lexikon der Musikinstrumente, zugleich ein Polyglossar für das gesamte Instrumentengebiet
- The stringed instruments of the Middle Ages: Their evolution and development
- A survey of musical instruments

2020 Additions (theme: rock)

- The encyclopedia of Australian rock and pop
- Lexikon Progressive Rock: Musiker, Bands, Instrumente, Begriffe
- Sachlexikon Rockmusik: Instrumente, Technik, Industrie

2021 Additions (theme: North America)

- The Canadian pop music encyclopedia
- Country music
- Diccionario enciclopédico de música en México
