= The Glory of the Empire =

1971 novel by Jean d'Ormesson

- Author: Jean d'Ormesson
- Original title: La Gloire de l'empire
- Translator: Barbara Bray
- Language: French
- Publisher: Éditions Gallimard
- Publication date: 29 September 1971
- Publication place: France
- English publication date: 1974
- Pages: 536
- ISBN: 2-07-028035-7

The Glory of the Empire: A Novel, a History (French: La Gloire de l'empire) is a 1971 novel by the French writer Jean d'Ormesson. It is written as a history book about a fictional ancient empire. The book was awarded the 1971 Grand Prix du roman de l'Académie française.

William Beauchamp of The New York Times described the book as a satire that "undermines important assumptions of the reigning ideology: that history is objective; narratives, neutral; that language transmits pre‐existing truth", and wrote that Ormesson's status in the French establishment contributes to making the book subversive.
