= Alice Swanson Esty =

American patron of the arts

Alice Theresa Hildagard Swanson Esty (November 8, 1904 – July 21, 2000) was an American actress, soprano and arts patron who commissioned works by members of Les Six and other French composers, and American composers such as Ned Rorem, Virgil Thomson. Claire Brook, and Marc Blitzstein, among others.

== Biography ==
She earned a degree from Bates College in 1925. She then moved to New York City to study singing and acting. She was hired as an actress with the Group Theater, which was directed by Lee Strasberg and Harold Clurman, and with the Provincetown Players, an avant-garde theater. Her Broadway credits include Come of Age, with Judith Anderson, and L'Aiglon, with Ethel Barrymore.

She married William C. Esty, founder of the William Esty Advertising Agency in the 1930s.

Esty continued her interest in the arts, and she began to commission works by many noted composers, poets, and visual artists. In the late 1950s and early 1960s she spent considerable time in Paris, where she befriended many important composers and artists. Between 1955 and 1969 she regularly commissioned musical compositions, and then performed them in major recital halls, including The Town Hall and Carnegie Recital Hall. If Mrs. Esty's talent as a singer was not perhaps perfect (Ned Rorem referred to her as "a soprano of style and means if not especially of temperament..."), her importance as an arts patron is certainly notable.

Esty lived in Paris frequently in the 1950s and the 1960s and between 1955 and 1969 she commissioned musical compositions from many French composers including Germaine Tailleferre, Darius Milhaud, Francis Poulenc, Henri Sauguet and others which she performed in her Town Hall and Carnegie Recital Hall concerts. In addition, she also commissioned Poulenc's Sonata for Two Pianos for the American piano duo Gold and Fizdale. In 1963, she commissioned works by French and American composers for a special memorial concert for the recently deceased Francis Poulenc, which she performed in Carnegie Recital Hall.

A $1 million donation from Esty created the Alice Swanson Esty Professor of Music position at Bates College. She received an honorary Doctor of Humane Letters from the college in 1984.

In 1994 and 1995, Mrs. Esty donated the manuscripts for many of her commissioned works to the Library of Bates College where they are located today. Esty died of cancer in New York.

== Partial list of works commissioned by Alice Esty ==
  - Arrieu, Claude, 1903–
  - Le Sable du Sablier: Melodies pour chant et piano
  - Text: Louise de Vilmorin
  - Composed: Undated
- Berkeley, Lennox, Sir, 1903–
  - Automne
  - Text: Guillaume Apollinaire
  - Composed: August 1963
  - Soprano and piano
- Berkeley, Lennox, Sir, 1903–
  - Five Poems by W. H. Auden
  - Text: W. H. Auden
  - Composed: 1958
  - Soprano and piano
- Bowles, Paul, 1910–
  - Roman Suite
  - Text: Tennessee Williams
  - Composed: 1960
  - Soprano and piano
- Bucht, Gunnar, 1927–
  - Sex Arstidssanger
  - Text: Gunnar Bjorling
  - Composed: 1965
  - Mezzo-soprano and piano
- Delannoy, Marcel
  - La Voix du Silence
  - Text: Maurice Carême
  - Composed: 1958
  - Soprano and piano
- Dutilleux, Henri, 1916–
  - San Francisco Night
  - Text: Paul Gibson
  - Composed: 1963
  - Soprano and piano
  - published by Éditions Alphonse Leduc, Paris
- Goehr, Alexander, 1932–
  - Warngedichte, op. 22
  - Text: Erich Fried
  - Composed: 1966–1967
  - Soprano and piano
- Jones, Charles, 1910–
  - Anima
  - Text: William Langland
  - Composed: 1967–1968
  - Soprano, viola, and piano
- Martin, Frank, 1890–1974
  - Dedicace
  - Text: Robert du la Haye
  - Composed: 1945
  - Soprano and piano
- Milhaud, Darius, 1892–1974
  - L'Amour Chante
  - Text: Joachim du Bellay, Marie de France, Alfred de Musset, Louise Labe, Arthur Rimbaud, Pierre de Ronsard, Maurice Sceve, and Paul Verlaine
  - Composed: 1964
  - Soprano and piano
- Milhaud, Darius, 1892–1974
  - Preparatif a la Mort en Allegorique Maritime
  - Text: grippa d'Aubigne
  - Composed: 1963
  - Soprano and piano
- Pinkham, Daniel
  - The Song of Jeptha's Daughter
  - Text: Robert Hillyer
  - Composed: 1963
  - Soprano and piano
- Porter, Quincy, 1897–1966
  - Seven Songs of Love
  - Text: Robert Graves
  - Composed: Undated
  - Soprano and piano
- Poulenc, Francis, 1899–1963
  - Le Travail du Peintre
  - Text: Paul Éluard
  - Composed: Undated
  - Soprano and piano
- Rieti, Vittorio, 1898–
  - Plus ne Suis
  - Text: Clément Marot
  - Composed: 1963
  - Soprano and piano
- Rorem, Ned 1923–
  - Poulenc
  - Text: Frank O'Hara
  - Composed: 1963
  - Soprano and piano
- Rorem, Ned 1923–
  - A Journey
  - Text: Andrew Glaze
  - Composed: 1976
  - Soprano and piano
- Rosenthal, Manuel
  - Le Jour d'un Mort
  - Text: Paul Gibson
  - Composed: 1963
  - Soprano and piano
- Sauguet, Henri
  - Celui Qui Dort
  - Text: Paul Éluard
  - Composed: 1963
  - Soprano and piano
- Sauget, Henri
  - Les Images (from Vie de Campagnes)
  - Text: [no information available]
  - Composed: Undated
  - Soprano and piano
- Sauguet, Henri
  - Vie des Campagnes
  - Text: Jean Follain
  - Composed: 1961
  - Soprano and piano
- Tailleferre, Germaine, 1892–1983
  - L'Adieu du Cavalier
  - Text: Guillaume Apollinaire
  - Composed: 1963
  - Soprano and piano
  - Published by Musik Fabrik, France
- Tailleferre, Germaine, 1892–1983
  - Pancarte pour une Porte D'Entree
  - Text: Robert Pinget
  - Composed: 1959
  - Soprano and piano
  - Published by Musik Fabrik, France
- Thomson, Virgil, 1896–
  - Songs for Alice Esty
  - Text: Kenneth Koch
  - Composed: 1959
  - Soprano and piano
- Thomson, Virgil, 1896–
  - Two by Marianne Moore
  - Text: Marianne Moore
  - Composed: 1963
  - Soprano and piano
- Weber, Ben, 1916–
  - A Bird Came Down the Walk, op. 57
  - Text: Emily Dickinson
  - Composed: 1963
  - Soprano and piano
