= Intermezzo pour deux pianos =

Piano composition by Germaine Tailleferre

The Intermezzo pour deux pianos (in English: for Two Pianos) is a work written by Germaine Tailleferre in 1946. The work was one of the first written by Tailleferre after she returned to France from her exile in the United States during World War II. It was originally written as part of a film score. The work is dedicated to a friend's recently born twin sons: Christian and Jacques Tual. The work was published in 1998 by the French publisher Musik Fabrik.

After studying with Maurice Ravel in the 1920s we see a shift in compositional style from the aesthetic of Les Six, to a more Neo-Baroque expression reminiscent of Bach. This stylistic change can be heard in this work.

The work is marked allegro and is in an ABA form. The first sections features rapid passages of sixteenth notes divided between the two pianos in a rather glassy, tonal atmosphere (perhaps suggesting children playing outdoors, given the dedication), a second section features a simple melody in quarter notes over ostinato passages in both pianos. The work ends with a recapitulation of the initial theme and ends quietly.

A modified version of this work is also included as a movement in Tailleferre's 1948 Ballet "Paris-Magie"

The Intermezzo for Flute and Piano, written in the same year by Tailleferre is completely unrelated musically to this work.

== Recordings ==
- Clinton-Narboni Duo "Germaine Tailleferre — Music for Two Pianos and Piano Four-Hands", Elan Recordings (1997)
