= Barry S. Brook =

American musicologist (1918–1997)

Barry Shelley Brook (November 1, 1918, New York City – December 7, 1997, New York City) was an American musicologist.

== Education & academia ==
Brook received his master's degree from Columbia University, where he studied with Paul Henry Lang, Erich Hertzmann (1902–1963), Hugh Ross, and Roger Sessions, in 1942; he received the doctorate from the Sorbonne in 1959. He became a fellow at City College of New York (1940–42) and continued at Queens College (1945–89). He founded the graduate program in music in 1967; he served as the program's executive officer until his retirement in 1989 from the Graduate School and University Center of the City University of New York.

Brook taught frequently at the Sorbonne. In 1984, the Centre National de la Recherche Scientifique asked him to design a new doctoral program in musicology at the École Normale Supérieure in Paris. Along with his duties at City University, he spent much time teaching in that new program in Paris.

Brook's research interests included Renaissance secular music, 18th- and 19th-century music and aesthetics, music iconography, and the sociology of music. He served as editor of a facsimile edition of the Breitkopf Thematic Catalogues (New York, 1966), an important source for the identification and dating of 18th-century compositions. His interest in music bibliography and its history led him to found Répertoire International de Littérature Musicale (RILM), the first international bibliography of music scholarship, in 1966; he served as the project's editor-in-chief until 1989. He was the president of the UNESCO founded International Music Council between 1982 and 1983.

Although he was known principally for his work in classical music, in the later years of his life Brook became fascinated with ethnomusicology. He often sought out and trained budding music historians in how to bring their reports and studies of local music traditions into the mainstream, academic world of music history.

He founded the Research Center for Music Iconography in 1972. He also founded the Barry S. Brook Center for Music Research and Documentation in 1989, which was named after him upon his death. It is located at the Graduate Center of the City University of New York.
