= Deux Poèmes de Lord Byron =

Songs by Germaine Tailleferre based on Lord Byron's poetry

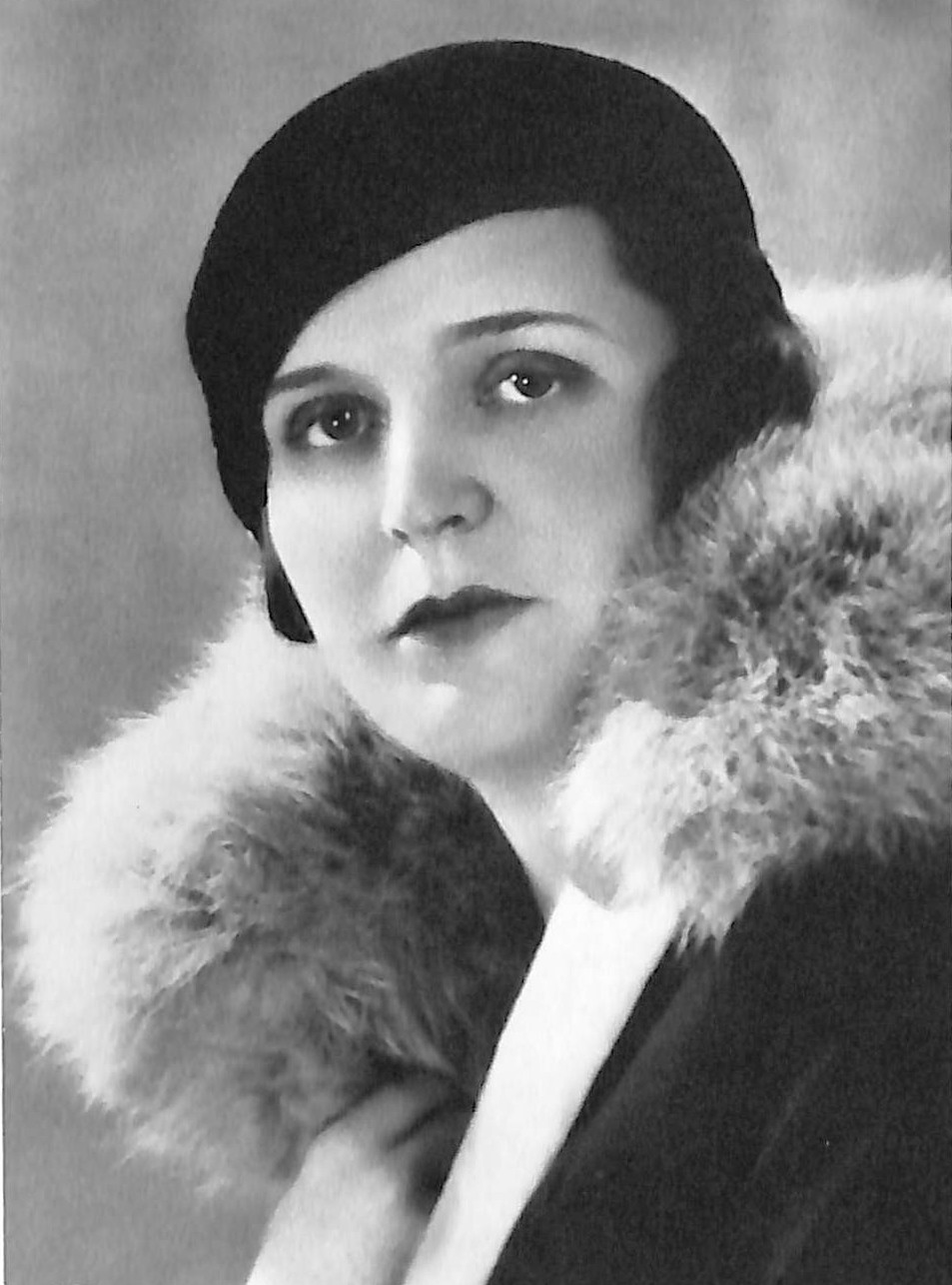
Germaine Tailleferre in 1922

"Deux Poèmes de Lord Byron" ("Two Poems by Lord Byron") are the only known songs set to an English text by Germaine Tailleferre and date from 1934. Although Tailleferre's manuscript has disappeared, a photocopy was found in the papers of the Italian mezzo-soprano and musicologist Patricia Adkins Chiti, who provided a copy which served as the source for their publication in 2003 by the French publisher Musik Fabrik.

These two songs were premièred in Paris on December 14, 1934 by the soprano Anita Réal with the composer at the piano on a programme which also contained the version for two pianos of her "Concerto for Two Pianos, Chorus, Saxophone Quartet and Orchestra". It has been suggested in Robert Shapiro's Germaine Tailleferre: a Biblio-biography (Greenwood Press 1994) that these settings were intended for a theatrical production, but no evidence has been found to prove this supposition.

The texts by Byron are "In Moments to Delight Devoted" (subtitled "From the Portuguese: 'Tu Mi Chamas'") and "Remembrance", from Hours of Idleness. The work lasts about five minutes.
