= Regina Hexaphone =

Regina Hexaphone is a Durham, North Carolina group established in 1997 by Sara Bell and Chris Clemmons. Its current members are Sara Bell (vocals, guitar, piano), Nathan Brown (electronic organ, accordion, guitar, vocals), Chris Clemmons (bass, vocals), Jerry Kee (drums), and Margaret White (violin, vocals).

Regina Hexaphone was established as a duo in the summer of 1997 after Clemmons heard some of Bell's work. Their first published work was "Every Traveler's Song", recorded at Kee's Duck-Kee studio in September 1997 with Kee on drums and Brian Sliwa on guitar. The song appeared on the Third Place Coffeehouse's Local Honey compilation CD. Regina Hexaphone's first gig was at the Cave in Chapel Hill in late December 1997 with Zeke Hutchins playing drums and Greg Humphreys on slide guitar. White joined the band about six months later.

The band contributed "Mary Don't You Weep" to the compilation CD Day Before Yesterday in the summer of 1998. The band remained productive and contributed addition recordings, including a self-produced album Eleven Songs, which was recorded and mixed by Kee and Anders Parker and released in 2001. Kee became the regular drummer at some point. In June 2004 the first "proper" album, The Beautiful World, was released by the band's own label, Erie Recordings. In 2007, the band released their most recent album, Into Your Sleeping Heart.

== Discography ==
Eleven Songs, 2001

- "Ice"
- "Cicadas"
- "New Wave Pop"
- "Radiate"
- "Hero Wings"
- "Ethan's Dreams"
- "Summer Bats"
- "The Robot with the Heart Shaped Hands"
- "Land"
- "Prowlers"
- "One Small Canoe"

The Beautiful World, 2004

- "The Seahorse And The Sand Dune"
- "Ice"
- "I Hear A Rumor"
- "Highway 65"
- "40 Days"
- "Bright Falling Stars"
- "Cicadas"
- "One Small Canoe"
- "Ethan’s Dreams"
- "Radiate"
- "Hero Wings"
- "Le Machine"

Into Your Sleeping Heart, 2007

- "Empty the Rivers"
- "The Forty-Niner"
- "Move"
- "Where the Angels Sing"
- "Bella Lilla"
- "Spider Boys"
- "Glory Be"
- "Waiting for the Wind"
- "Parade"
- "Baby Come Down"
- "The Rib Shack"
- "Mehitabel"
