= Pancarte pour une porte d'entrée =

Song cycle by Germaine Tailleferre set to text by Robert Pinget

"Pancarte pour une porte d'entrée" (in English "Handbill for an entrance", sometimes incorrectly referred to as "Onze Chants" or "Eleven Songs" in some sources) is a cycle of eleven songs composed by Germaine Tailleferre to the poems of the novelist and poet Robert Pinget written in 1959. The work was published in 2000 by the French publishers Musik Fabrik.

The work was commissioned by the American soprano and patron of the arts Alice Swanson Esty who also commissioned Tailleferre's "L'Adieu du Cavalier" for Esty's memorial concert for Francis Poulenc in 1964. The cycle was premièred in France on March 12, 1961, at Radio France by the French Baritone Aimé Doniat with the composer at the piano and premièred in the United States on March 13, 1961, at Alice Esty's recital in Carnegie Hall.

Tailleferre met Pinget through her daughter Françoise Lageat. She wrote this work on eleven successive evenings during the time she spent working on her opera "Le Maître", setting one poem each evening. Years later, she herself said "I had great fun writing this work". The short, witty texts allowed Tailleferre to use her natural sense of brevity to produce a compact and varied set of songs.

The 11 songs are

1. Les Chapeaux (Hats)
2. Désinvolture (relaxed attitude)
3. L'Oiseau des Îles (Tropical bird)
4. Cours (lessons)
5. L'Émeraude (The Emerald)
6. Sainte Nitouche (play on words: Saint (feminine) Don't Touch)
7. Partage (Sharing)
8. L'Insecte (The Insect)
9. L'Hirondelle (The Swallow)
10. Le Serpent (The Snake)
11. Pancarte pour une porte d'entrée (Handbill for an Entrance)

The eleven poems are extremely short and the complete cycle lasts less than ten minutes to perform.
