= Toccata for Two Pianos =

Piano composition by Germaine Tailleferre

The Toccata for Two Pianos is a work by Germaine Tailleferre, written in 1957 for the American two-piano team Gold and Fizdale, to whom it is dedicated. The tocatta was published in 1999 by the French music publisher Musik Fabrik.

The work is composed of two motives: a rapid passage of widely spaced intervals which alternates between the two pianos and a bi-tonal "taxi"-like motive which enters in a cyclical passage. After a slower passage using irregular time signatures and "Stravinskian" polytonality, the initial material is presented in a fugato, which brings the work to a brisk close. A typical performance takes about four minutes.

In Georges Hacquard's catalog of Tailleferre's works, there is an orchestration by French composer Désiré Dondeyne listed as being "inserted into the orchestral score of 'La nouvelle Cythère', but this orchestration was never reallzed. It is thought that Georges Hacquard asked Dondeyne to orchestrate this so that the 1929 ballet would correspond to a scenario that Hacquard had written for it. It is difficult, given the pianistic nature of this work, to imagine a version for any other instrumentation.

== Recordings ==
- Clinton-Narboni Duo "Germaine Tailleferre – Music for Two Pianos and Piano Four-Hands", Elan Recordings (1997)
