= Michel Quint =

French writer

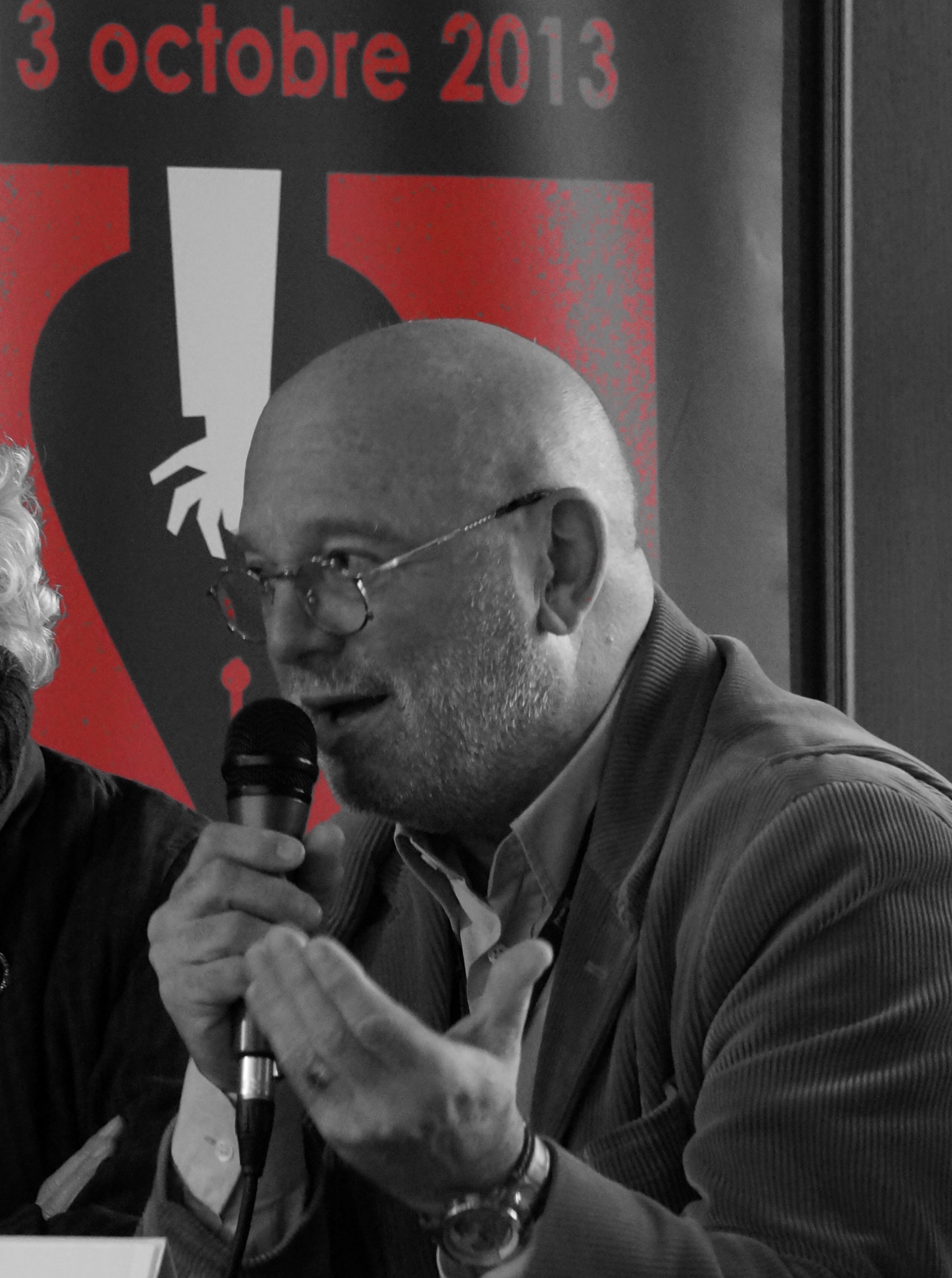
Michel Quint, 2013.

Michel Quint (born 1949) is a French writer from the Nord-Pas-de-Calais.

== Works ==
- Le testament inavouable, Fleuve Noir
- Mauvaise conscience, Fleuve Noir
- Posthume, Fleuve Noir
- Hôtel des deux roses, Fleuve Noir
- Bella ciao, Fleuve Noir
- La dernière récré, Fleuve Noir
- Mascarades, Fleuve Noir
- Les grands ducs, Calmann-Lévy
- Aimer à peine (2001)
- Corps de ballet, Estuaires (2006)
- Sur les pas de Jacques Brel (2008), Presses de la Renaissance
- L'espoir d'aimer en chemin (2006), Gallimard
- Jadis, Fleuve Noir
- Lundi perdu, éditions Joëlle Losfeld
- Cake walk, éditions Joëlle Losfeld
- L'éternité sans faute, Rivages
- Une ombre, sans doute (2008) éditions Joëlle Losfeld-Gallimard
- Et mon mal est délicieux, Gallimard, 2005
- Aimer à peine, Joëlle Losfeld, 2002
- Billard à l'étage, Rivages, 1989
- Effroyables jardins, Joëlle Losfeld, 2000
- Le Bélier noir, Rivages, 1999
- Sanctus, Terrain Vague, 1990
- À l'encre rouge, Rivages, 1985
- Cadavres au petit matin, Souris Noire.
