= Joseph Fahys =

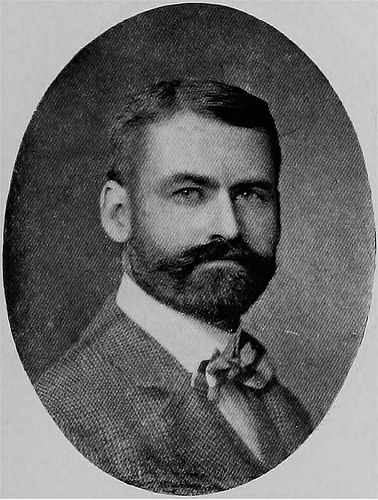
- Born: May 28, 1832; Belfort, France
- Died: December 11, 1915 (aged 83)
- Citizenship: France and USA
- Organization(s): Joseph Fahys & Co., Alvin Manufacturing Co., Brooklyn Watch Case Co., Sea View Elevated Railroad Co., and Victoria Fire Insurance Co.
- Board member of: Jewelers' Board of Trade (President), Watchcase Manufacturers' Association (President), Chamber of Commerce of the State of New York, Union League, Downtown Association, Homoeopathic Hospital Lafayette Avenue, Presbyterian Church and Brooklyn Institute of Arts and Sciences
- Children: George Ernest Fahys
- Parents: Joseph Fahys (father); Marianne Moulleseaux Fahys (mother)

Joseph Fahys (May 28, 1832 – December 11, 1915) was one of the first U.S. watch case manufacturers. After emigrating from France, he went on to establish Joseph Fahys & Co., which at one time was the largest manufacturer of watch cases and one of the largest manufacturers of silverware in the United States. He was also the founder and first president of the Jewelers' Board of Trade, and the first president of the Watchcase Manufacturers' Association.

== Early life and education ==
Fahys was born on May 28, 1832, in Belfort, France. He was the son of Joseph and Marianne Moulleseaux Fahys. His father was a contractor; and both his father and brother died when Fahys was young. In company with his mother, he came to New York in March 1848. He apprenticed himself to Ulysse Savoye (1811-1886), of West Hoboken, New Jersey, one of the two first makers of watch cases in the United States. He remained in Savoye's employ for five years, and soon after attaining his majority, began an independent career.

== Career ==
Fahys bought out the Savoye business on June 1, 1857. He continued it under his own name and moved the factory to the fourth floor of 75 Nassau Street, New York City before later moving the plant to Carlstadt, New Jersey. In 1861, he formed a connection with Fortenbach Brothers (John, Jacob, and Joseph), which resulted in the building at Carlstadt, one of the first establishments in America which manufactured watch cases on an extensive scale; for five years, business was profitable. In 1867, Fahys located a similar factory in Brooklyn in which he associated with Wheeler, Parsons & Hayes, and the joint enterprise was known as the Brooklyn Watch Case Company. When both factories were well under way, Fahys sold his New York store to Ward & Jennings, two of his employees, and gave his undivided attention to his manufacturing interests. In 1876, he bought the share of the Fortenbach Brothers and moved the Carlstadt plant to Sag Harbor, Long Island. For many years he made a specialty of silver watch cases.

He was president of Joseph Fahys & Co., located in the Fahys Building, on 54 Maiden Lane, New York City; the company was established in 1857. Fahys' son-in-law, Henry Francis Cook, who was president of the Montauk Steamboat Company, became a partner of Fays & Co. in 1880. A year later, he built his own factory in the harbor. In 1887, in connection with A. N. Darling, Hayden W. Wheeler, Lewis A. Parsons and Henry Hays, he founded the Brooklyn Watch Case Co. for the manufacture of solid gold cases and retained a dominant interest in this for many years though he devoted his time principally to his own factory at Sag Harbor.

Fahys was the founder and first president of the Jewelers' Board of Trade, and the first president of the Watchcase Manufacturers' Association. He was a member of the Chamber of Commerce of the State of New York, the Union League, and the Downtown Association. He was a trustee of the Homoeopathic Hospital, the Lafayette Avenue Presbyterian Church, and the Brooklyn Institute of Arts and Sciences. He was director of the Alvin Manufacturing Co., Brooklyn Watch Case Co., Sea View Elevated Railroad Co., and Victoria Fire Insurance Co.

In the 1930s, the Bulova Watch Company took over Fahys' watch factory.

== Personal life ==
In 1856, he married a woman from the Hommedieus, an old Sag Harbor family with Huguenot roots. Their son, George Ernest Fahys, who became a partner in the Fahys Co., was born in West Hoboken in 1864. Fahys's daughter, Lena Marianne, married Cook in 1883.

Fahys and Cook purchased one thousand acres of land in North Haven, a suburb of Sag Harbor, with two miles of frontage on Peconic Bay. Fahys' Clinton Hill, Brooklyn residences were designed in 1889 and 1890 by Benjamin Wistar Morris III. Morris also designed Fahys' Long Island country house. Fahys also lived in New York City on Park Avenue. He died at his summer home in Sag Harbor, Long Island.
