= Jean d'Ormesson =

French novelist, writer and public figure (1925–2017)

Count Jean d'Ormesson
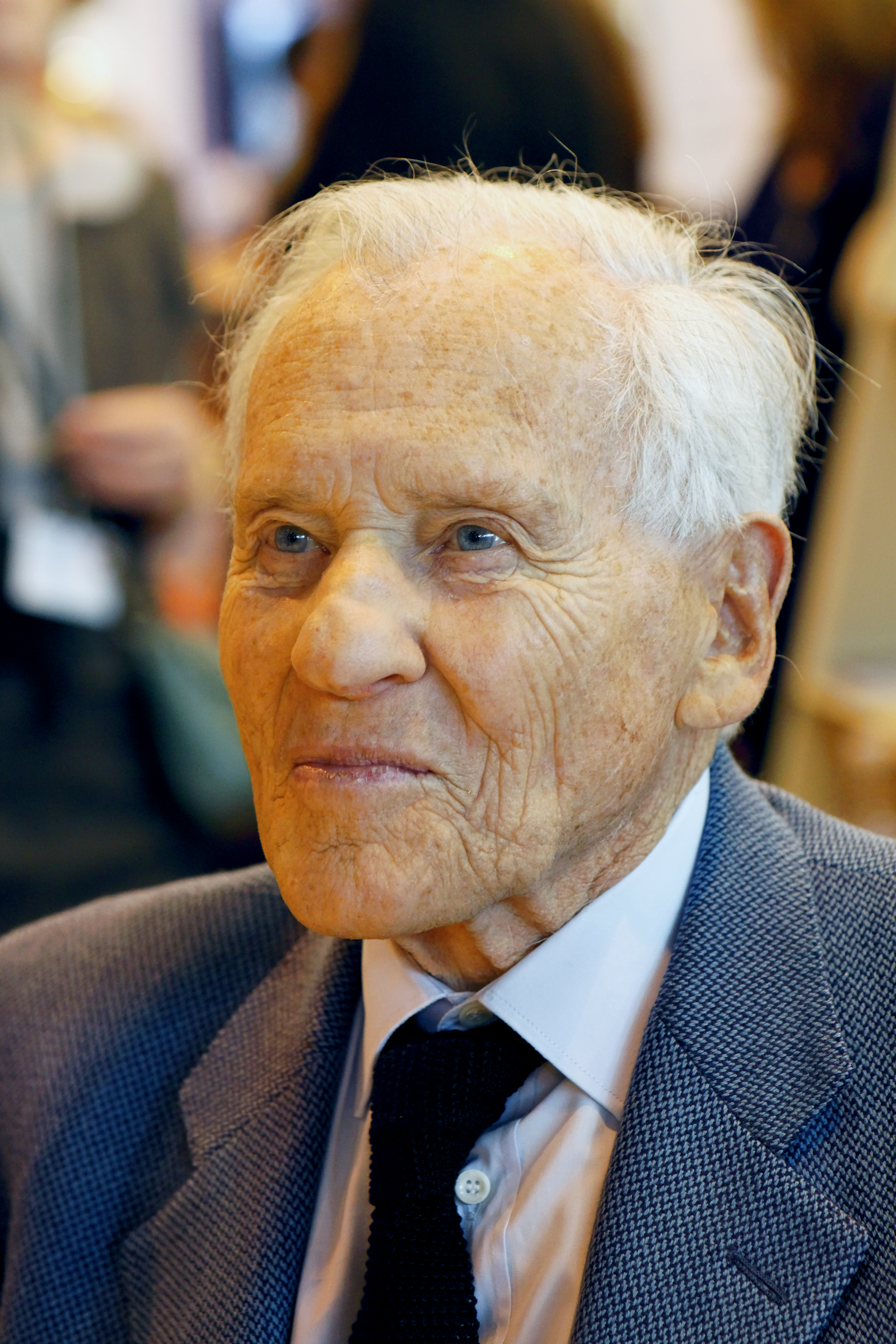
- Jean d'Ormesson in 2011
- Born: Jean Bruno Wladimir François-de-Paule Lefèvre d'Ormesson; 16 June 1925; 7th arrondissement of Paris, France
- Died: 5 December 2017 (aged 92); Neuilly-sur-Seine, France
- Resting place: Père Lachaise Cemetery, Paris
- Education: Lycée Henri-IV
- Alma mater: École normale supérieure
- Occupations: Writer, columnist, reporter, philosopher, newspaper director
- Spouse: Françoise Béghin
- Children: Héloïse d'Ormesson
- Writing career
- Language: French
- Notable works: Au revoir et merci (1966); The Glory of the Empire (1971); Au plaisir de Dieu (1974); Dieu, sa vie, son œuvre (1981); C'était bien (2003); C'est une chose étrange à la fin que le monde (2010)
- Notable awards: Académie Française (seat 12); Grand Prix du roman de l'Académie française Grand Cross of the Legion of Honour

Signature
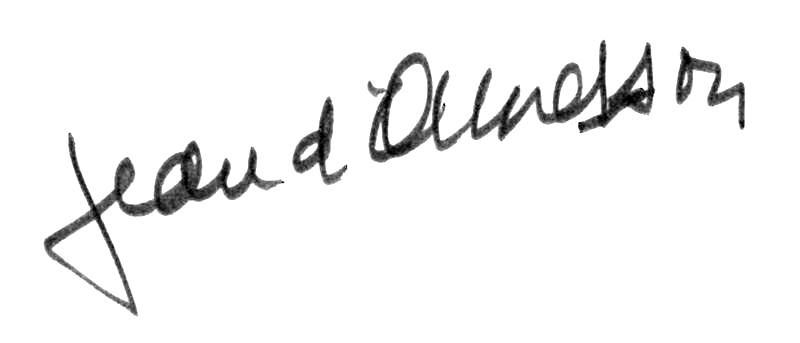

Jean Bruno Wladimir François-de-Paule Lefèvre d'Ormesson (French: [ʒɑ̃ dɔʁməsɔ̃]; 16 June 1925 – 5 December 2017) was a French writer and novelist. He authored forty books, was the director of Le Figaro from 1974 to 1977, as well as the dean of the Académie Française, to which he was elected in 1973, until his death, in addition to his service as president of the International Council for Philosophy and Human Sciences within UNESCO (1992–1997). A major public figure in France, known for his art de la conversation, Jean d'Ormesson was saluted as "the best of the French spirit" by President Emmanuel Macron upon his death.

== Early life ==
Jean d'Ormesson was born on 16 June 1925 in Paris into an aristocratic family; he was a count. His father, André Lefèvre, Marquis of Ormesson, was the French ambassador to Brazil.

D'Ormesson grew up in Bavaria, Romania and Brazil. He also spent time at the Château de Saint-Fargeau. He was raised as a Roman Catholic, and later called himself a secular Catholic, but not an atheist.

D'Ormesson attended preparatory school at the Lycée Henri-IV, and he was admitted to the École normale supérieure; he subsequently passed the agrégation in Philosophy.

== Career ==
D'Ormesson was the author of more than forty books, including novels and plays. His first novels, L'amour est un plaisir, Un amour pour rien, Les illusions de la mer, were unsuccessful. His The Glory of the Empire received the Grand Prix du roman from the Académie française in 1971. His next novel, Au plaisir de Dieu, was made into a television film. His work was published in Bibliothèque de la Pléiade in 2015, while he was still alive.

D'Ormesson became Secretary-General of the International Council for Philosophy and Humanistic Studies at UNESCO, and the director of the conservative French newspaper Le Figaro from 1974 to 1979. D'Ormesson self-identified as conservative.

On 18 October 1973, d'Ormesson was elected a member of the Académie française, taking seat 12, following the death of Jules Romains, in 1973. On the death of Claude Lévi-Strauss on 30 October 2009, he became the Dean of the Académie, its longest-serving member.

D'Ormesson was a Grand Cross of the Legion of Honour, and an officer of the National Order of Merit. In 2010, he was awarded the Ovid Prize, Romania, in recognition of his body of work.

== Personal life and death ==
D'Ormesson married Françoise Béghin in 1962. They had a daughter, Héloïse, an editor.

On 5 December 2017, Jean d'Ormesson died in Neuilly-sur-Seine, at the age of 92. A national tribute was paid on 8 December 2017 in Les Invalides, where French President Emmanuel Macron gave a speech; former presidents Nicolas Sarkozy and François Hollande were also in attendance.

== Bibliography ==
- L'Amour est un plaisir (1956)
- Du côté de chez Jean (1959)
- Un amour pour rien (1960)
- Au revoir et merci (1966)
- Les Illusions de la mer (1968)
- La Gloire de l'Empire (1971) – Grand Prix du roman de l'Académie française
- Au plaisir de Dieu (1974)
- Le Vagabond qui passe sous une ombrelle trouée (1978)
- Dieu, sa vie, son œuvre (1981)
- Mon dernier rêve sera pour vous (1982)
- Jean qui grogne et Jean qui rit (1984)
- Le Vent du soir (1985)
- Tous les hommes en sont fous (1985)
- Le Bonheur à San Miniato (1987)
- Album Chateaubriand (1988) – Bibliothèque de la Pléiade
- Garçon de quoi écrire (with François Sudreau, 1989)
- Histoire du juif errant (Wandering Jew story) (1991)
- Tant que vous penserez à moi (with Emmanuel Berl, 1992)
- La Douane de mer (1994)
- Presque rien sur presque tout (1995)
- Casimir mène la grande vie (1997)
- Une autre histoire de la littérature française (vol. I, 1997 & vol. II, 1998)
- Le Rapport Gabriel (1999)
- Voyez comme on danse (2001)
- C'était bien (2003)
- Et toi, mon cœur, pourquoi bats-tu? (2003)
- Une fête en larmes (2005)
- La Création du monde (2006)
- Odeur du temps (2007)
- Qu'ai-je donc fait (2008)
- L'enfant qui attendait un train (2009)
- Saveur du temps (2009)
- C'est une chose étrange à la fin que le monde (2010)
- Un jour je m'en irai sans en avoir tout dit (2013)
- Comme un chant d'espérance (2014)
- Dieu, les affaires et nous (2015)
- Je dirai malgré tout que cette vie fut belle (2016) – Prix Jean-Jacques-Rousseau
- Le guide des égarés (2016)
- Et moi, je vis toujours (2018)
- Un Hosanna sans fin (2018)

=== Filmography ===
- 2012: Les saveurs du Palais (also known as Haute Cuisine) as Le Président, directed by Christian Vincent
- 2018: Michel Déon ou la force de l'amitié directed by Jérémie Carboni (documentary)
