= Répertoire International de Littérature Musicale =

Nonprofit music research organization

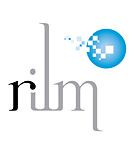
- Type: Nonprofit organization
- Industry: Music Research Resources
- Founded: 1966
- Founder: Barry S. Brook
- Headquarters: The City University of New York; New York City, United States
- Key people: Tina Frühauf (Executive Director); Zdravko Blažeković (Executive Editor)
- Products: RILM Abstracts of Music Literature, RILM Abstracts of Music Literature with Full Text, RILM Music Encyclopedias, RILM Index to Printed Music, [MGG Online]
- Number of employees: 40+
- Website: www.rilm.org

Répertoire International de Littérature Musicale (International Repertory of Music Literature; Internationales Repertorium der Musikliteratur), commonly known by its acronym RILM, is a nonprofit organization that offers digital collections and advanced tools for locating research on all topics related to music. Its mission is "to make this knowledge accessible to research and performance communities worldwide….to include the music scholarship of all countries, in all languages, and across all disciplinary and cultural boundaries, thereby fostering research in the arts, humanities, sciences, and social sciences." Central to RILM's work and mission is the international bibliography of scholarship relating to all facets of music research.

== History ==
RILM was founded in 1966 by the American musicologist Barry S. Brook (1918–1997) under the joint sponsorship of the International Musicological Society (IMS) and the International Association of Music Libraries, Archives and Documentation Centres (IAML). In 2007 the International Council for Traditional Music (ICTM) joined as a third sponsoring organization.

During 1967 and 1968, RILM developed its first set of computer programs for the automated processing and sorting of bibliographic records and author/subject indexes. They ran first on the mainframe IBM computer IBM System/360 at the computing center of The City University of New York. The S/360 was delivered by IBM in 1964 and it was at that time the most advanced computing machine. The original IBM S/360 software was later migrated to IBM System/370 and used in the production of RILM Abstracts for twenty years, from 1969 to 1988. RILM's development of procedures for computerized data processing was immediately adopted by Répertoire International de Littérature d’Art (RILA), founded upon RILM's model, which started publishing abstracts in 1975.

In 1979 RILM entered an agreement with Lockheed Research Laboratory in Palo Alto, a division of Lockheed Missiles and Space Company, Inc., for the distribution of its data through the telephone lines. Later on, this agreement was transferred to DIALOG Information Retrieval Services. Although available online already before the advent of the Internet, until the end of the twentieth century the primary medium for distribution for its bibliographic records were printed volumes.

From 1993 onward RILM was no longer available on DIALOG Information Retrieval Service, but in 1989 the National Information Service Corporation (NISC) in Baltimore released RILM Abstracts of Music Literature on CD-ROM. During the 1990s RILM Abstracts became available online through NISC Muse (1993–2010), OCLC First Search (1994–2010), Ovid/SilverPlatter (2002–2010), and Cambridge Scientific Abstracts/ProQuest (2002–2010) platforms. RILM databases are available through EBSCO Information Services; RILM's platform, Egret, offers RILM Music Encyclopedias and MGG Online.

RILM's first editorial office was located at the Queens College, City University of New York (1967–68). The Graduate Center, CUNY has provided an institutional context for RILM's International Center since 1968.

== Organization ==
RILM has a staff of over 40 employees: editors, technology experts, and administrators. It is governed and guided by a board of directors and an advisory committee, the Commission Mixte International, which consists of appointed members of the International Musicological Society (IMS), the International Association of Music Libraries, Archives and Documentation Centres (IAML), and the International Council for Traditional Music (ICTM). Barry Brook's second report, published in the March 1968 issue of Notes, details the deliberations of the Commission Mixte as it worked to establish the procedures and functioning of RILM.

== Online publications ==
RILM Abstracts of Music Literature

RILM Abstracts of Music Literature covers significant international scholarship in both printed and digital media, and in any language. Published since August 1967, it consists of citations of articles, single-author books and collections of essays, bibliographies, catalogues, master's theses and doctoral dissertations, Festschriften, films, videos, technical drawings of instruments, facsimile editions, iconographies, commentaries included with critical editions of music, ethnographic recordings, conference proceedings, reviews, web resources as well as over 3500 periodicals that dovetail with the coverage of Répertoire International de la Presse Musicale. It differs from other music periodical indexes through its coverage of books, abstracts, indexing, and broad international yet selective coverage. Each entry provides the title in the original language, an English translation of the title, full bibliographic data, and an abstract with a detailed index, all of which help to convey the "aboutness" of the record (amplified online by the relevance-based order of display in the individual record. Many of the non-English entries also include an abstract in the language of the publication.

Following the UNESCO model, RILM Abstracts was conceived as a cooperative of national committees responsible for contributing bibliographic citations and abstracts for the publications issued in their respective countries to the International Office in New York. Today committees contribute about 15,000 records annually, which are edited, indexed, and added to the online database. Another 35,000 records per year are produced by editors at the International Office. Bibliographic information and abstracts—as well as journals that have not yet been covered by RILM—can also be submitted directly to the International Center in New York.

RILM Abstracts of Music Literature was the first abstracted bibliography in the humanities and designated by the American Council of Learned Societies (ACLS) as the pilot project for the development of a computerized, bibliographical system in the humanities to serve as a model for the more than 30 constituent scholarly societies of the ACLS. At the time when RILM Abstracts was published only in print, its subject thesaurus and name equivalencies, which led users to the preferred terms, were translated into seventeen languages and alphabetically integrated with the subject index. This practice allowed users to find the desired English-language term or the spelling of a personal name by initiating the search from the language most familiar to them. Gradually RILM Abstracts expanded its multilingual environment and the database now includes, besides standard English-language abstracts, also abstracts in the language of publication and in other languages whenever available. In the mid-2000s RILM Abstracts began to expand its coverage of Asian publications, with music scholarship published in Chinese periodicals. Concurrently, all elements of bibliographic records for publications issued in non-roman writing systems were offered bilingual.

RILM Abstracts of Music Literature appeared from 1967 to 1983 in triannual printed volumes with indexes corresponding to annual volumes as well as cumulative indexes corresponding to five-year periods; from 1984 to 1999 in annual volumes with corresponding indexes; and since 2000 it is available exclusively online through EBSCOhost.

RILM Abstracts of Music Literature with Full Text

In July 2016 RILM Abstracts of Music Literature expanded with the addition of music periodicals in full-text. RILM Abstracts of Music Literature with Full Text (RAFT) offers access to 250 music periodicals from many countries. Coverage also includes reviews as well as obituaries, editorials, correspondence, advertisements, and news, published from the early twentieth century to the present. In addition to metadata, abstracts, and indexing, RAFT offers searching and browsing tools for each full-text issue, cover to cover. The database is updated monthly. Details of each title's current coverage can be found in the title list at rilm.org/fulltext. New titles are added over time.

RILM Music Encyclopedias

In December 2015, RILM launched RILM Music Encyclopedias (RME) with 41 titles. Librarian Laurie Sampsel asserts that "cross searching the full text of so many titles yields results impossible (or highly unlikely) to find using the print versions of these encyclopaedias." Stephen Henry mentions RME's "ability to provide access to some excellent European resources that might not otherwise be available to libraries with less than comprehensive collections."

RME’s titles stem from different periods and countries: The earliest, Jean-Jacques Rousseau’s Dictionnaire de musique, was published in 1775. There is also the first edition of "The Grove," in an edition published by Theodore Presser in 1895. The largest number of titles date from 2000 onward. Among them are Ken Bloom's Broadway, Lol Henderson and Lee Stacey's Encyclopedia of Music in the 20th Century, Peter Matzke et al., Das Gothic- und Dark Wave-Lexikon, and Richard Kostelanetz's Dictionary of the Avant-Gardes. The comprehensive Handwörterbuch der musikalischen Terminologie, conceived between 1972 bis 2006, is also included. RME holds important titles for ethnomusicologists, among them The Garland Encyclopedia of World Music and Eileen Southern's Biographical Dictionary of Afro-American and African Musicians, which is the first single comprehensive volume of its kind. The collection expands annually with additions of four titles in average. One of the titles, Komponisten der Gegenwart (KDG), is being regularly updated with new articles or additions to existing articles.

Index to Printed Music

On 1 July 2018, RILM assumed ownership of IPM. Previously, it was owned by the James Adrian Music Company, which was founded in 2000 by George R. Hill.

The Index to Printed Music (IPM) is the only digital finding aid for searching specific musical works contained in printed collections, sets, and series. It indexes individual pieces of music printed in the complete works of composers, in anthologies containing pieces from disparate historical periods, and in other scholarly editions. It provides a granular level of detail about each piece, including performing forces, language, multiple clefs or figured bass, and more. IPM includes the complete contents of Collected Editions, Historical Series & Sets & Monuments of Music: A Bibliography, by George R. Hill and Norris L. Stephens (Berkeley: Fallen Leaf Press, 1997), which, in turn, was based upon Anna H. Heyer's Historical Sets, Collected Editions, and Monuments of Music: A Guide to Their Contents (American Library Association, 1957–1980).

Since 2019 IPM offers new features, among them biographical facts identifying composers, editors, and lyricists; hyperlinks to open-access editions; music incipits for works that are otherwise difficult to distinguish from each other; easy toggling between collections and the individual works contained therein; and expanded search filters to enable refined searching by place and date of publication, document type, genre, and language of text.

Bibliolore

RILM hosts the blog Bibliolore whose posts have direct relationships to content found in RILM Abstracts of Music Literature and its enhancement, RILM Abstracts of Music Literature with Full Text, as well as RILM Music Encyclopedias, MGG Online, and Index to Printed Music. New posts appear every week, many of which celebrate round birthdays of musical figures and anniversaries. Since its inception in 2009, Bibliolore has published over 1500 posts and has been viewed over 600,000 times.

== Print publications ==
Between 1967 and 1999, RILM published RILM Abstracts of Music Literature in print, first quarterly and later annually. The 1999 volume, the last print volume, is the largest, with 19,619 records.

Since 1972, RILM has also published print volumes in the RILM Retrospectives series. These topical bibliographies commenced with the first edition of Barry S. Brook's Thematic Catalogues in Music: An Annotated Bibliography (Stuyvesant, NY: Pendragon Press, 1972). Recent volumes published in the series include Speaking of Music: Music Conferences 1835–1966 (2004), an annotated bibliography of 5948 papers on musical topics presented at 447 conferences. While building on the previous efforts, the volume stays true to Brook's original vision while expanding upon it as well: it covers more than 130 years of conference proceedings and has a worldwide scope, though Western Europe remains in focus. The subsequent volume, Liber Amicorum: Festschriften for Music Scholars and Nonmusicians, 1840–1966, is an annotated bibliography catalogue of 574 Festschriften, totaling 118 pages and 715 entries. The next part of the volume (totaling 355 pages and 3881 entries) documents all of the articles pertaining to music found in the listed Festschriften, preceded by an introductory history of Festschriften. All volumes are principally devoted to research materials published before RILM issued its first volume in 1967.

The RILM Perspectives series of conference proceedings explores topics related to the organization's global mission. The inaugural volume, Music’s Intellectual History: Founders, Followers & Fads of 2009, edited by Zdravko Blažeković and Barbara Dobbs Mackenzie, is based on papers presented at the conference on music historiography, held at The Graduate Center, CUNY, 16–19 March 2005.

RILM has issued two editions of its comprehensive style guide, How to Write About Music: The RILM Manual of Style. The second edition introduces material not included in the 2005 publication as well as revisions based on suggestions from readers. The manual differs significantly from the generalized style guides such as MLA or APA by explicating the matters of gender-neutral language, dead language, and punctuation (from the serial comma to the em dash) through the lens of music. The manual is specifically suited for students.

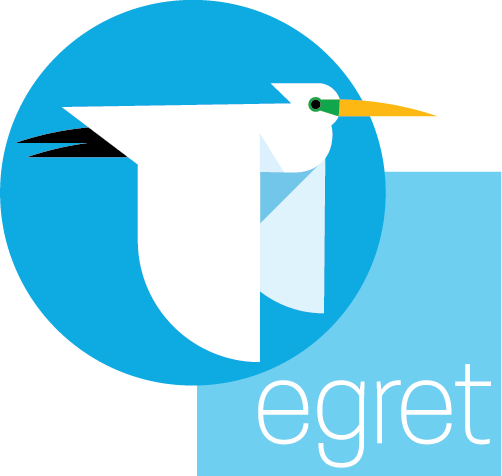

== RILM's platform Egret ==
RILM has developed a stand-alone platform with the most advanced search and browse capabilities to host and distribute music reference works, beginning with the authoritative German-language music encyclopedia Die Musik in Geschichte und Gegenwart (MGG). Egret facilitates automatic translation of content to over 100 languages via Google Translate integration, user accounts where annotations and notes can be created, saved, and shared, cross references linking related content throughout MGG Online, links to related content in RILM Abstracts of Music Literature and others, as well as an interface compatible with mobile and tablet devices. The search function is hailed as a powerful but easy-to-use tool, with different options available for limiting search results. Specific search results can be easily located in a preview section. MGG Online is based on the second edition of Die Musik in Geschichte und Gegenwart, but it includes continuous updates, revisions, and additions. Egret allows the user to access earlier versions of revised articles. In February 2020 RILM Music Encyclopedias was launched on Egret.

== See also ==
- Répertoire International d'Iconographie Musicale (RIdIM)
- Répertoire International des Sources Musicales (RISM)

== Bibliography ==
- Bayne, Pauline Shaw, A Guide to Library Research in Music (Lanham, MD: Scarecrow Press, 2008).
- Blažeković, Zdravko, RILM Abstracts of Music Literature in its Global Environment: The Past and Vision for the Future (Lecture, 2014).
- Brook, Barry S., "Music Literature and Modern Communication: Revolutionary Potentials of the ACLS/CUNY/RILM project", College Music Symposium 40 (2000) 31–41.
- Brook, Barry S., "Music Literature and Modern Communication: Some Revolutionary Potentials of the RILM Project", Acta Musicologica 42, nos. 3–4 (1970): 205–17; also published in Journal of the Indian Musicological Society 2, no. 1 (1971): 9–19.
- Brook, Barry S., "Musikliteratur und moderne Kommunikation: Zum Projekt RILM", Beiträge zur Musikwissenschaft 13, no. 1 (1971): 18–20.
- Brook, Barry S., "Some New Paths for Music Bibliography", Computers in Humanistic Research: Readings and Perspectives (Englewood Cliffs: Prentice-Hall, 1967), 204–211.
- Brook, Barry S., "The Road to RILM", in Modern Music Librarianship: In Honor of Ruth Watanabe, ed. Alfred Mann (Stuyvesant, Pendragon Press; Kassel: Bärenreiter Verlag, 1989), 85–94.
- Cleveland, Susannah and Joe C. Clark, eds., Careers in Music Librarianship III: Reality and Reinvention (Milwaukee: A-R Editions, 2014).
- Gottlieb, Jane, Music Library and Research Skills, 2nd ed. (New York: Oxford University Press, 2017).
- Green, Alan, "Keeping up with the Times: Evaluating Currency of Indexing, Language Coverage and Subject Area Coverage in the Three Music Periodical Index Databases," Music Reference Services Quarterly 8, no. 1 (January 2001): 53–68.
- Green, Alan, "The RILM Project: Charting the Seas of Modern Musicological Literature," College Music Symposium 40 (January 2000): 42–54.
- Jenkins, Martin D., "A Descriptive Study of Subject Indexing and Abstracting in International Index to Music Periodicals, RILM Abstracts of Music Literature, and The Music Index Online", Notes: Quarterly Journal of the Music Library Association 57, no. 4 (2001): 834–863.
- Mackenzie, Barbara Dobbs, "RILM at 40: A View from the Bridge," Fontes Artis Musicae 54, no. 4 (2007): 421–439.
- Mackenzie, Barbara Dobbs, "RILM as a Starting Point for Research," Ictus: Periódico Do Programa de Pós-Graduação Em Música Da UFBA 9, no. 2 (2008): 48–58.
- Mackenzie, Barbara Dobbs, "Répertoire International de Littérature Musicale (RILM): Immutable Mission amidst Continual Change," in Music, Libraries, and the Academy: Essays in Honor of Lenore Coral (Middleton, WI: A-R Editions, 2007), 129–142.
- Schiødt, Nanna, "RILM: Répertoire International de Littérature Musicale", Dansk musiktidsskrift 45, no. 4 (1970): 168–173.
- Schuursma, Ann May Briegleb, "Summary Report of activities IAML Project Group on Classification and Indexing", Fontes Artis Musicae 37, no. 1 (Jan–Mar 1990): 46–48.
- Spivacke, Harold, "A New Journal of Abstracts for Musicologists", Computers and the Humanities 2, no. 3 (1968): 120–124.
