= Gold and Fizdale =

Arthur Gold
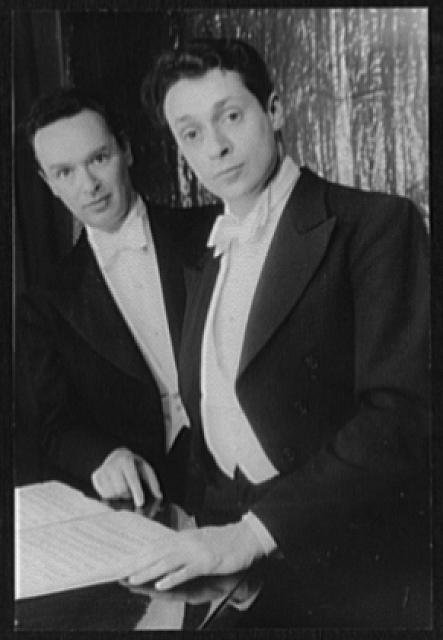
- Arthur Gold and Robert Fizdale, 1952
- Born: February 6, 1917; Toronto
- Died: January 3, 1990 (aged 72)
- Resting place: Oakland Cemetery (Sag Harbor, New York)
- Education: Juilliard School

Robert Fizdale
- Born: April 12, 1920; Chicago
- Died: December 6, 1995 (aged 75)
- Resting place: Oakland Cemetery (Sag Harbor, New York)
- Education: Juilliard School

Arthur Gold (6 February 1917 – 3 January 1990) and Robert Fizdale (12 April 1920 – 6 December 1995) were an American two-piano ensemble; they were also authors and television cooking show hosts.

Robert (Bobby) Fizdale was born Robert Fish, the son of John and Rose Fish of Chicago. He had a brother, Walter. Both Gold and Fizdale were of Russian Jewish descent.

Gold and Fizdale met during their student years at the Juilliard School; where Gold was a pupil of Rosina Lhévinne and her husband Josef and Fizdale was a pupil of Ernest Hutcheson. They formed a lifelong gay partnership and shared interests in music (forming one of the most important piano duos of the 20th century), travel, and cooking.

== Two-piano ensemble ==
Gold and Fizdale made their professional debut in 1944 at the New School for Social Research performing a program of 20th century music that included the world premieres of John Cage’s A Book of Music (one of Cage's earliest experiments in using the prepared Piano) and Cage's Three Dances (first version) for two prepared pianos, both composed for them. This was the first of several commissions from American and French composers premièred by the piano duo in the second half of the 20th century. Some of the other composers from whom they commissioned works include Georges Auric, Samuel Barber, Howard Brubeck, Paul Bowles, Darius Milhaud, Francis Poulenc, Vittorio Rieti, Henri Sauguet, Germaine Tailleferre, Virgil Thomson, and Ned Rorem. In the field of jazz they collaborated with Dave Brubeck.

Among their friends were American literary and cultural figures such as Truman Capote, James Schuyler, George Balanchine and Jerome Robbins, among others.

In 1948, they were among the wave of American artists, musicians, and writers who took advantage of the first opportunity after the end of World War II to travel freely throughout Europe. They arrived in Paris with a letter of introduction from Marcelle de Manziarly to Germaine Tailleferre of Les six who invited them to a lunch with Francis Poulenc and Georges Auric. This lunch ended with Auric and Tailleferre taking the score of Virgil Thomson's "The Mother of Us All", which Thomson had given as a gift, turning it upside down on the piano and having Poulenc singing all of the roles (including Susan B. Anthony) in nonsense English syllables which were supposedly an imitation of Gertrude Stein's Libretto while Tailleferre and Auric improvised a four-hands version of Thomson's score.

Tailleferre invited the couple to her home in Grasse to spend two months while she was writing her ballet Paris-Magie and her opera Il était Un Petit Navire. She wrote two-piano versions of both works and gave them to the duo as a gift. These manuscripts were later donated to the Library of Congress after the death of Robert Fizdale. Tailleferre later dedicated two other works to Gold and Fizdale: her Toccata for Two Pianos and her Sonata for Two Pianos. Francis Poulenc also wrote his own Sonata for Two Pianos for "the Boyz" (as he called them), a commission which was paid by their mutual friend the American soprano and arts patron Alice Swanson Esty, according to Poulenc's correspondence.

The duo also recorded a number of recordings featuring works by Les six, Vittorio Rieti, and other composers, as well as a series of concerto recordings with Leonard Bernstein and The New York Philharmonic, including the Poulenc Concerto for Two Pianos, the Mozart Two Piano Concerto and Saint-Saëns's "Carnival of the Animals".

== Literary and culinary careers ==
In the late 1970s, Arthur Gold began to have problems with his hands which made it difficult for him to perform, so the duo began to write biographical works, including "Misia: the Life of Misia Sert" (Knopf; 1st edition January 12, 1980), and "The Divine Sarah: a Biography of Sarah Bernhardt" (Knopf 1991).

The duo also began writing food articles for Vogue magazine and began a television cooking show. In 1984 they published The Gold and Fizdale Cookbook (Random House 1984), which is dedicated to their friend George Balanchine, "In whose kitchen we spent many happy hours..."

In 1996, after the death of Fizdale, his estate donated the personal papers, recordings and other memorabilia to the Juilliard School, where they are kept in the school's Peter Jay Sharp Special Collections Room in the Juilliard Library Gold and Fizdale are buried alongside each other at Oakland Cemetery in Sag Harbor, New York.

== Works written for Gold and Fizdale ==
- Paul Bowles
  - "Concerto" for Two Pianos (1946–47)
  - "Sonata" for Two Pianos (1947)
  - "Night Waltz" for Two Pianos (1949)
  - "A Picnic Cantata" for Two Pianos (1953)
- John Cage
  - "A Book of Music" for Two Pianos
- Francis Poulenc
  - L'embarquement pour Cythère (1951)
  - Sonate for Two Pianos (1952–53)
  - Elegy for Two Pianos (1959)
- Vittorio Rieti
  - Suite Champetre for Duo Pianos (1948)
- Germaine Tailleferre
  - Il était un Petit Navire Suite for Two Pianos
  - Paris-Magie version for Two Pianos
  - Toccata for Two Pianos
  - Sonata for Two Pianos
- Samuel Barber
  - Souvenirs, Op. 28

== Recordings ==
- Modern Waltzes for Two Pianos (Columbia 1951) works by Georges Auric, Paul Bowles, Vittorio Rieti, Henri Sauguet, Germaine Tailleferre, Virgil Thomson)
- 1900 - 1952 Music For 2 Pianos (Columbia 1954, ML 4853) works by Igor Stravinsky, Paul Hindemith, Vittorio Rieti
- Mendelssohn: The Two Concertos for Two Pianos and Orchestra (Columbia 1964, ML6081/MS6681) Felix Mendelssohn, Eugene Ormandy, Philadelphia Orchestra
- Gold & Fizdale play Dave Brubeck's Jazz Ballet Points on Jazz (Columbia 1961) works by Dave Brubeck
