= L'Adieu du cavalier =

Song by Germaine Tailleferre set to text by Guillaume Apollinaire

"L'adieu du cavalier" (in English "The Knight's Farewell", subtitled "in Memoriam Francis Poulenc) is a song for voice and piano written by Germaine Tailleferre in 1963 on a poem of the same title by Guillaume Apollinaire. The work was published in 2003 by the French publishers Musik Fabrik.

The work was commissioned by the American soprano and patron of the arts Alice Swanson Esty for Esty's memorial concert for Francis Poulenc in 1964 at Carnegie Hall, at which she also premièred other songs by Darius Milhaud, Ned Rorem, Henri Dutilleux and others written for the occasion.

This short song takes about two and half minutes to perform.
