= Sonata for Two Pianos (Tailleferre) =

1974 work by Germaine Tailleferre

The Sonata for Two Pianos is a work by Germaine Tailleferre written in 1974 for the American two-piano team Gold and Fizdale, to whom it is dedicated. The sonata was published in 1999 by the French music publisher Musik Fabrik.

The work is in three movements: an opening toccata-like allegretto, a slower andantino which uses a theme clearly inspired by the Pavane in Tailleferre's 1929 ballet La Nouvelle Cythère and a final brilliant allegro which uses polytonality to create a playful atmosphere which ends abruptly.

The work was probably never performed by Gold and Fizdale, due to their retirement from the concert stage because of Arthur Gold's problems with his hands.

== Recordings ==
- Clinton-Narboni Duo "Germaine Tailleferre - Music for Two Pianos and Piano Four-Hands", Elan Recordings (1997)
