= Robert Pinget =

French writer (1919–1997)

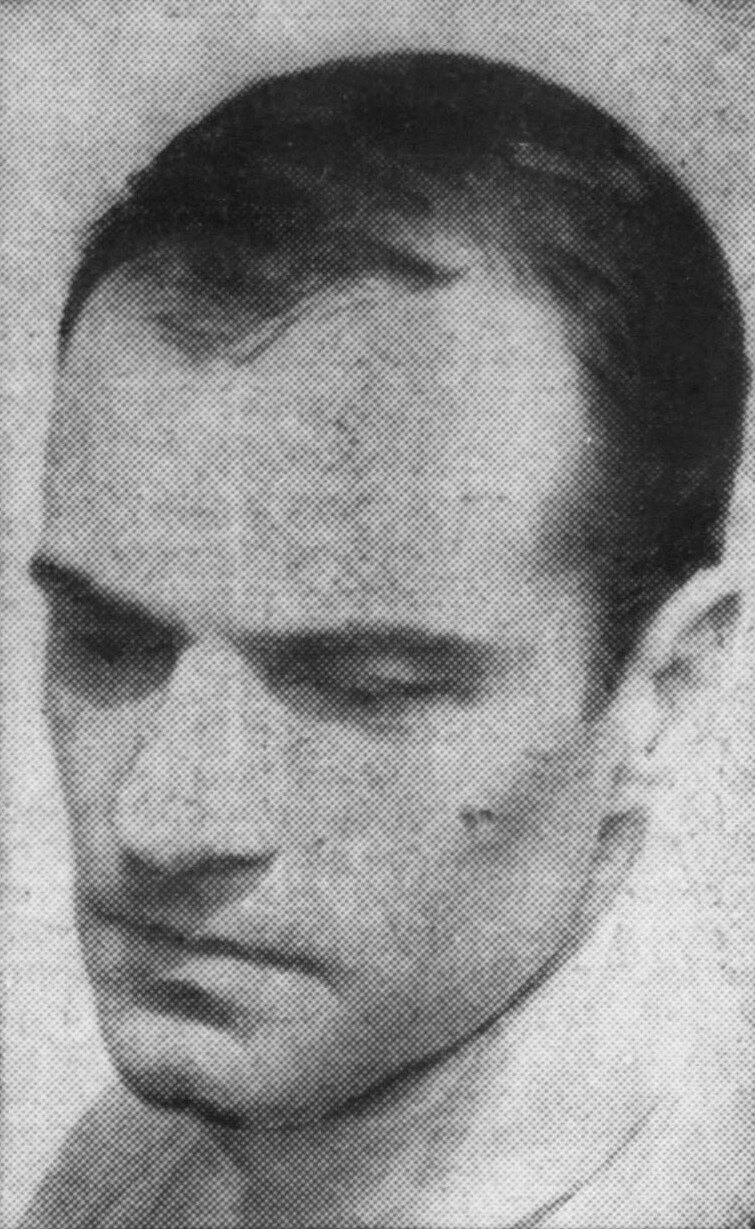
- Pinget c. 1957
- Born: 19 July 1919; Geneva, Switzerland
- Died: 25 August 1997 (aged 78); Tours, France
- Writing career
- Notable work: The Inquisitory Someone
- Literary movement: Nouveau roman

Robert Pinget (French pronunciation: [ʁɔbɛʁ pɛ̃ʒɛ]; 19 July 1919 – 25 August 1997) was a Swiss-born French novelist and playwright associated with the nouveau roman movement.

== Life and work ==
Robert Pinget was born in Geneva, Switzerland in 1919. After completing his law studies at the Collège de Genève and working as a lawyer for a year, he moved to Paris in 1946 to attend the Ecole des Beaux-Arts where he studied painting under Jean Souverbie.

In 1951, he published his first novel, Entre Fantoine et Agapa. After publishing two other novels, but then having his fourth rejected by Gallimard, Pinget was recommended by Alain Robbe-Grillet and Samuel Beckett to Jérôme Lindon, head of Éditions de Minuit, where he published Graal Flibuste in 1956, and subsequently the rest of his work. He became a French citizen in 1960, and purchased a 16th-century house in Touraine where he spent the rest of his life.

Scholars and critics have often associated his work with that of his friend Samuel Beckett, whom he met in 1955.

He died of a stroke in Tours in 1997.

== Adaptations ==
The Old Tune, Samuel Beckett's free translation of La Manivelle, was produced by Barbara Bray and broadcast on BBC Third Programme on 23 August 1960.

In 1962, Germaine Tailleferre of Les Six set eleven of Pinget's poems in a song cycle entitled "Pancarte pour Une Porte D'Entrée" (roughly translated as "Handbill for an Entrance") for medium voice and piano, commissioned by the American Soprano and Arts Patron Alice Swanson Esty.

== Bibliography ==
=== Novels ===
- Entre Fantoine et Agapa (La Tour de Feu, 1951). Between Fantoine and Agapa, trans. Barbara Wright (Red Dust, 1982)
- Mahu ou le Matériau (Robert Laffont, 1952). Mahu or The Material, trans. Alan Smith (Calder & Boyars, 1966; Dalkey Archive, 2005)
- Le Renard et la boussole (Gallimard, 1953).
- Graal Flibuste (Ed. de Minuit, 1956). Graal Flibuste, trans. Anna Fitzgerald (Dalkey Archive, 2014)
- Baga (Ed. de Minuit, 1958). Baga, trans. John Stevenson (Calder & Boyars, 1967; 1984)
- Le Fiston (Ed. de Minuit, 1959). Monsieur Levert, trans. Richard Howard (Grove, 1961); also as No Answer, trans. Richard N. Coe (Calder, 1961)
- L'Inquisitoire (Ed. de Minuit, 1962). The Inquisitory, trans. Donald Watson (Calder & Boyars, 1966; 1982; 2003)
- Quelqu'un (Ed. de Minuit, 1965). Someone, trans. Barbara Wright (Red Dust, 1984)
- Le Libera (Ed. de Minuit, 1968). The Libera Me Domine, trans. Barbara Wright (Red Dust, 1978)
- Passacaille (Ed. de Minuit, 1969). Recurrent Melody, trans. Barbara Wright (Calder & Boyars, 1975); republished as Passacaglia (Red Dust, 1978)
- Fable (Ed. de Minuit, 1971). Fable, trans. Barbara Wright (Calder, 1980)
- Cette voix (Ed. de Minuit, 1975). That Voice, trans. Barbara Wright (Red Dust, 1982)
- L'Apocryphe (Ed. de Minuit, 1980). The Apocrypha, trans. Barbara Wright (Red Dust, 1986)
- Monsieur Songe (Ed. de Minuit, 1982). Monsieur Songe, trans. Barbara Wright (Red Dust, 1988)
- Le Harnais (Ed. de Minuit, 1984). The Harness (1988)
- Charrue (Ed. de Minuit, 1985). Plough (1988)
- L'Ennemi (Ed. de Minuit, 1987). The Enemy, trans. Barbara Wright (Red Dust, 1991)
- Du Nerf (Ed. de Minuit, 1990). Be Brave, trans. Barbara Wright (Red Dust, 1994)
- Cette Chose (1967; 1990). By Robert Pinget and Jean Deyrolle (editor)
- Théo ou Le temps neuf (Ed. de Minuit, 1991). Théo or The New Era, trans. Barbara Wright (Red Dust, 1994)
- Tâches d'encre (Ed. de Minuit, 1997). Traces of Ink, trans. Barbara Wright (Red Dust, 2000)
- Mahu reparle (Ed. des Cendres, 2009)
- La Fissure, précédée de Malicotte-la-Frontière (Ed. MētisPresses, 2009)
- Jean Loiseau, in Histoires littéraires n° 40 (2010)

=== Plays ===
- Lettre morte (Ed. de Minuit, 1959). Dead Letter (1963)
- La Manivelle (Ed. de Minuit, 1960). Bilingual edition with Samuel Beckett's free translation, The Old Tune
- Clope au dossier (Ed. de Minuit, 1961). Clope (1963)
- Ici ou ailleurs, Architruc, L'Hypothèse (Ed. de Minuit, 1961)
- Autour de Mortin (Ed. de Minuit, 1965). About Mortin (1967)
- Abel et Bela (Ed. de Minuit, 1971). Abel and Bela, trans. Barbara Wright (Red Dust, 1987)
- Identité (Ed. de Minuit, 1971)
- Paralchimie, suivi de Architruc, L'Hypothèse, Nuit (Ed. de Minuit, 1973)
- Un testament bizarre, et autres pièces (Ed. de Minuit, 1986). Includes: Un testament bizarre, Mortin pas mort, Dictée, Sophisme et sadisme, Le chrysanthème, Lubie
- De rien (1992). About Nothing (1989)
- L'Affaire Ducreux, et autres pièces (1995). Includes: L'Affaire Ducreux, De rien, Nuit, Le bifteck

=== Compilations in English ===
- Plays, Volume 1 (Calder, 1963). Includes: The Old Tune (trans. Samuel Beckett); Clope (trans. Barbara Bray); Dead Letter (trans. Barbara Bray).
- Plays, Volume 2 (Calder & Boyars, 1967). Includes: Architruc; About Mortin; The Hypothesis. Translations by Barbara Bray.
- Monsieur Songe (Red Dust, 1988). Also includes "The Harness" and "Plough". Translations by Barbara Wright.
- A Bizarre Will and Other Plays (Red Dust, 1989). Includes: A Bizarre Will; Mortin Not Dead; Dictation; Sophism and Sadism; The Chrysanthemum; Crazy Notion; Night; and About Nothing. Translations by Barbara Wright.
- Trio (Dalkey Archive, 2005). Includes: Between Fantoine and Agapa; That Voice; Passacaglia. Translations by Barbara Wright.

=== Interviews and works about Pinget ===
- Robert Pinget: The Novel as Quest, by Robert Henkels, 1977.
- Jean-Louis de Rambures, "Comment travaillent les écrivains", Paris 1978 (includes an interview with R. Pinget, in French)

== Awards and honors ==
- 1959: Prix Rambert, for Le Fiston
- 1965: Prix Femina, for Quelqu'un
- 1987: Grand prix national des Lettres
