= Joseph Fahys & Co. =

American watchmaker company

Joseph Fahys & Co, Inc.
- Type: New York Corporation
- Industry: Watchmaking
- Genre: Watchmaker
- Founded: 1857
- Founder: Joseph Fahys
- Headquarters: New York City, United States
- Products: Watches and Smartwatches
- Parent: TGX Holdings
- Website: josephfahys.com

Joseph Fahys & Co is a watchmaker headquartered in New York. It was founded in 1857 by Joseph Fahys, a French emigrant.

Joseph Fahys & Co is most famous for their production of the Dust Proof Case and the Magnetically Shielded Case during the 1880s. The company's handmade gold and silver watches are sought after and highly collectible today. In 2013, Joseph Fahys & Co began developing a luxury American-made smartwatch with a patent-pending kinetically charged battery.

== History ==
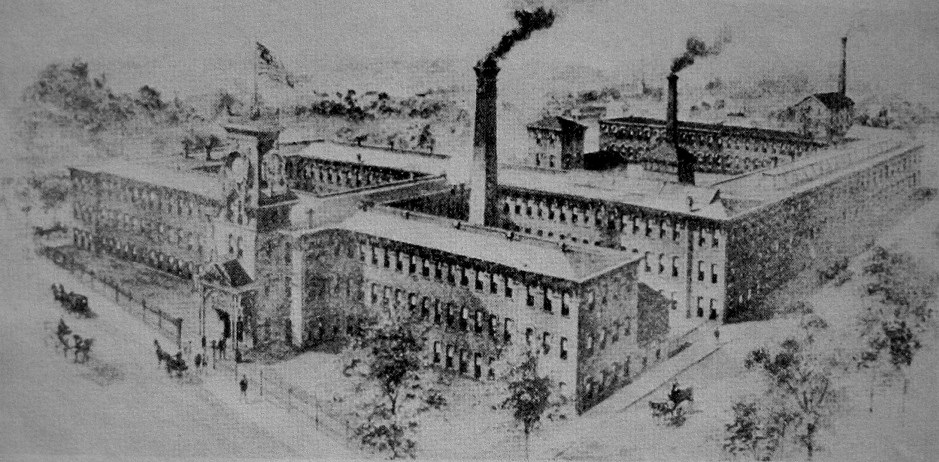
The Fahys Watch Case Co Factory in Sag Harbor 1878

The founder of the company, Joseph Fahys, was born on May 28, 1832, in Belfort, France. In 1848, Fahys emigrated from France to the United States with his mother.

He was apprenticed to Ulysse Savoye (1811-1886), of West Hoboken, New Jersey, who was one of the two first watch case makers in the United States. He remained Savoye's employee for five years until beginning an independent career at the age of 21.

In 1857, Fahys opened his own business in New York City and in 1861 built an additional factory, under the name Foutenbach & Sons, in Carlstadt, New Jersey In 1878 the factory was renamed Joseph Fahys.

The business was officially incorporated in 1881, and in 1882 moved operations to Sag Harbor, New York. The watch plant in Sag Harbor was titled ‘The Fahys Watch Case Co.’, while the firm in New York remained under the name ‘Joseph Fahys & Co.’ The corporation absorbed the Brooklyn Watch Case Company and the Alvin Manufacturing Company of New Jersey.

During this time, the company not only manufactured watch cases but was also the biggest producer of silverware in the United States. Fahys used his influence and success to found the Jewellers Board of Trade in 1884, and was the first president of the Watchcase Manufacturers Association. During the latter part of the 19th Century, the company was the largest manufacturer of gold and silver watch cases in the United States. Fahys’ watch factory in Sag Harbor created an immediate demand for manual as well as skilled labor. A large proportion of its laborers were retired seamen and immigrants.

Fahys employed a high number of Hungarian, Polish, and Italian workers, many of whom were expert engravers. The company earned a reputation for providing excellent working conditions and benefits for its employees. Under growing financial strain Fahys sold the Sag Harbor plant to Joseph Bulova, an Austrian watchmaker who continued to produce watch cases in the factory until 1975.

=== Factories and offices ===
Fahys & Co, Fahys was moved from Hoboken, New Jersey to New York. Shortly after, however, he relocated the factory again to Carlstadt, New Jersey. A second factory was opened in 1867 in Brooklyn.

Early in 1880, Fahys met with the Sag Harbor Business Aid Committee, and the New York Times later reported the selection of Sag Harbor as the future site of a new watchcase factory, stating, "Plans furnished by John A. Wood called for two main buildings 200 feet in length, three stories high, and connected by a 100-foot structure. Five separate buildings, each one story high, would be constructed to house a blacksmith shop, boiler, engine rooms and rooms for annealing and smelting silver and gold. They would be constructed of brick and granite trim, have stone floor and roofs of tin, making them absolutely fireproof. Steam would be used for heating and gas for lighting, which would be manufactured on the premises.The relocation of the factory led to a housing boom in Sag Harbor, with approximately 80 small factory workers’ houses being built to accommodate the new workers. The factory building itself has been labelled as “Gradgrind" architecture, a name inspired by an inflexible, dictatorial Dickens character. Wilfrid Sheed in ‘Sag Harbor Is: A Literary Celebration’ said that the building was “one of those epic anomalies that help to define a landscape by clashing with it.

In 1925, much of the Sag Harbor factory was destroyed by fire. By 1931, amidst the financial pressures of Great Depression, the factory was closed. In 1937, Joseph Bulova, an Austrian watchmaker, took a ten-year lease on the building, and later bought it. Bulova operated the factory until 1975, when the plant was closed due to increased overseas competition and a changing marketplace. In 2014, the abandoned factory was redeveloped into a luxury complex consisting of condominiums, penthouses and townhouses named ‘The Watchcase’.

While the Fahys factories have been in various locations, the offices have always been New York based. The offices were first based at 75 Nassau Street until 1861, when they moved to 9 Maiden Lane, then to 38 Maiden Lane and then to 41 Maiden Lane. In 1896 the Fahys building at 54 Maiden Lane, running through to Liberty Street, was built and the offices and showrooms were relocated there.

In 2015 Joseph Fahys & Co moved its headquarters to the iconic Empire State Building in New York City.

== Watches ==
=== Mechanical watches ===
Since 1857, all Fahys watchcases have been fitted with high-quality mechanical movements. The cases were made of gold, silver and ore silver (nickel) and Fahys' goods were acknowledged by the entire trade to be unequaled in their strength and workmanship.

During the mid-1880s, Joseph Fahys & Co marketed a range of Dust Proof Cases which were resistant to dirt and water.

In the late 1880s, there was a growing concern about the risk of watchcases becoming magnetized. To answer such concerns, Fahys utilized the Giles Anti-Magnetic Shield in order to release a range of magnetically shielded cases.

Joseph Fahys & Co manufactured a variety of shapes of watches. Fahys gave some of these styles unique names, for example, the Raleigh, the Boston, the Olympia, and the Cambridge. The company also offered a range of engraved styles ranging from Locomotive designs to Ships of the Spanish–American War. The company also produced bracelet watches.

At the height of production during the First World War, Joseph Fahys & Co. also produced a series of silver trench watch cases that housed Marvin A. Cattin and Imperial Branded movements.

=== Smart Watches ===
Joseph Fahys & Co developed and released a smartwatch, In-Touch, at the end of 2018. The device was the first to feature a patent-pending kinetically charged battery.
