= List of compositions for viola: S =

This article lists compositions written for the viola. The list includes works in which the viola is a featured instrument: viola solo, viola and piano, viola and orchestra, ensemble of violas, etc. Catalogue number, date of composition and publisher (for copyrighted works) are also included. Ordering is by composer surname.

This pages lists composers whose surname falls into the S alphabetic range. For others, see respective pages:

- List of compositions for viola: A to B
- List of compositions for viola: C to E
- List of compositions for viola: F to H
- List of compositions for viola: I to K
- List of compositions for viola: L to N
- List of compositions for viola: O to R
- List of compositions for viola: T to Z

== S ==
=== Sa ===
- Kaija Saariaho (1952–2023)

Aure for violin and viola (2011); Chester Music
Vent Nocturne for solo viola and electronics (2006); Chester Music
Je sens un deuxième coeur for viola, cello and piano (2003); Chester Music
New Gates for flute, viola and harp (1996); Chester Music

- Peter Sacco (1928–2000)

Sequence for viola and piano, Op. 138 (1966); Ostara Press

- Harald Sæverud (1897–1992)

Sonatina for viola and piano (1989); Music Information Centre Norway

- Camille Saint-Saëns (1835–1921)

Le cygne (The Swan) from The Carnival of the Animals for viola or viola d'amore and piano (1886); adaptation by Louis van Waefelghem (1895?)
Sérénade for viola and piano, Op. 16 No. 2 (1862); original for cello and piano; adaptation by Louis van Waefelghem

- Philip Sainton (1891–1967)

Crépuscule for viola and piano (1935); Boosey & Hawkes
Lament for violin or viola and piano (1926); Augener Editions
Phantom Gavotte for viola and piano; Modus Music
Sérénade Fantastique for viola and orchestra (1935)

- Aulis Sallinen (b. 1935)

Concerto for clarinet, viola and chamber orchestra, Op. 91 (2007); Novello & Co.

- Erkki Salmenhaara (1941–2002)

Elegie IV in C minor for viola solo (1967); Edition Fazer; Fennica Gehrman; Warner/Chappell Music Finland
Poema for solo violin (or viola, or cello) and string orchestra (1975); Edition Fazer; Fennica Gehrman; Warner/Chappell Music Finland

- Esa-Pekka Salonen (b. 1958)

Pentatonic Étude for viola solo (2008, revised 2014); Chester Music

- Timothy Salter (b. 1942)

Mosaics for flute (piccolo), viola and harp (1991); Usk Edition
Declamation for viola solo (2002); Usk Edition
Prelude and Fugue for viola (or clarinet) and piano (1976); Usk Edition

- Leonard Salzedo (1921–2000)

Concerto for viola and orchestra, Op. 100 (1983)
Eves Apologie, Cantata for mezzo soprano, viola and string orchestra, Op. 125 (1993); words by Emilia Lanier
Sonata for violin and viola, Op. 132 (1995)

- Gustave Samazeuilh (1877–1967)

Deux pièces brèves (2 Short Pieces) (1947); Éditions Durand; Elkan-Vogel
1. Lamento for viola (or cello) solo
2. D'un printemps heureux for viola (or cello) and piano

- Steven Sametz (b. 1954

Two Songs for Lent for countertenor and viola (1973)
Voices of Broken Hearts for female chorus and digitally delayed viola (2010); ECS Publishing

- Rhian Samuel (b. 1944)

Blythswood, 3 Pieces for viola and piano (1998); Stainer & Bell
Emerging (Lightly) for solo viola and chamber ensemble (2008); Stainer & Bell
Stepping Out II, Trio for clarinet, viola and piano (2000); Stainer & Bell
Through Windows and the Balustrades Beyond for flute, viola and harp (1998); Stainer & Bell
Time Out of Time: Little Suite for viola and piano (2001); original for cello and piano; Stainer & Bell

- Lars Sandberg (b. 1955)

Väntans svit: musik till dikter av Birgitta Lillpers (Väntans Suite: Music to Poems of Birgitta Lillpers) for viola solo (1998); Swedish Music Information Centre

- Adolf Sandberger (1864–1943)

Trio-Sonata in C minor for violin, viola and piano, Op. 4 (1889)

- Luis Sandi (1905–1996)

Hoja de álbum 2 for viola and piano (1986); Ediciones Mexicanas de Música
Miniaturas (Miniatures) for viola solo (1994); Liga de Compositores de México

- Dalmazio Santini (1923–2001)

Concerto for viola and orchestra (1980)

- Cláudio Santoro (1919–1989)

Adágio for viola and piano (1946, 1965); Edition Savart
Concerto No. 1 for viola and orchestra (1988); Edition Savart
Duo for violin and viola (1982); Edition Savart
Duo for female voice and viola (1987); Edition Savart
Espaços (Space) for viola and piano (1966); Edition Savart
Fantasia Sul America for viola solo (1983); Edition Savart
Fantasia Sul America for viola and orchestra (1983); Edition Savart
Mutationen IV for viola and tape (1971–1972); Edition Savart
Paródia for voice, viola, and other instruments (piano, percussion) ad libitum (1982); Edition Savart
Sonata No. 1 for viola and piano (1943); unfinished
Sonata No. 2 for viola and piano (1982); Edition Savart

- Guido Santórsola (1904–1994)

Canção triste e dança brasileira for viola and piano or orchestra (1934)
Chôro No. 1 in G major for viola (or violin) and piano (1944)
Chôro No. 2 in G major for violin or viola and piano (or orchestra) (1952); Bèrben Edizioni Musicali
Concerto for viola and orchestra with mixed chorus and viola d'amore (1932–1933)
Díptico for viola (or violin) and guitar (1970); Editora Novas Metas
3 Estados psicológicos for violin or viola and orchestra (1936)
Mangangá, Study for viola solo (1953)
Preludio y fuga a la manera clásica for 2 violas and double bass (1937)
Sonata in D minor for violin or viola and piano (1928); Bèrben Edizioni Musicali
Sonata-fantasía for viola and orchestra (or piano) (1938)
Trio for flute, viola and piano (1969)

- Joly Braga Santos (1924–1988)

Cançaõ for viola and piano (1971); AvA Musical Editions
Nocturne in B minor for viola and string orchestra, Op. 11 (1947)
Concerto for viola and orchestra, Op. 31 (1960)

- Jerzy Sapieyevski (b. 1945)

Concerto for Viola and Winds; Mercury Music; Theodore Presser Company

- Allen Sapp (1922–1999)

Colloquies II for flute, viola and piano (1978)
First Viola Sonata for viola and piano (1948); American Composers Alliance

- Ruben Sargsyan (Ruben Sarkisyan) (1945–2013)

Concerto for viola and chamber orchestra (1992)

- László Sáry (b. 1940)

Diana búcsúja (Diana's Farewell) for 8 violins and 8 violas (1976); Editio Musica Budapest
For Viola or Cello: Hommage à Philip Glass for viola or cello solo (1977); Editio Musica Budapest

- Henri Sauguet (1901–1989)

Trois Pièces (3 Pieces) for viola solo (1972); Symétrie
Musique pour Cendrars for baritone and viola (1986); Symétrie

- Ernest Sauter (1928–2013)

Essai sur "l'accord prométhéen" for viola solo and string trio (1988); Walter Wollenweber Verlag; revision for viola solo and string orchestra (2000); Edition Kunzelmann
Sonata for viola solo (1974); Walter Wollenweber Verlag

- Eugène Sauzay (1809–1901)

Pièce en trio in G major for violin, viola and piano, Op. 7 (published 1855)

- David Sawer (b. 1961)

Parthenope for viola solo (2003); Universal Edition

- Robert Saxton (b. 1953)

Invocation, Dance and Meditation for viola and piano (1991); Chester Music
Concerto for viola and orchestra (1986); Chester Music

- Fazıl Say (b. 1970)

Ruşen Güneş Anısına (In Memoriam Ruşen Güneş), Sonata for viola solo, Op. 92 (2020); Schott Music

- Ahmed Adnan Saygun (1907–1991)

Concerto for viola and orchestra, Op. 59 (1976–1977); Peermusic Classical

- Bruce Saylor (b. 1946)

Duo for violin and viola (1970); King's Crown Music Press; Galaxy Music Corporation; Columbia University Music Press; Subito Music

=== Sc ===
- Alessandro Scarlatti (1660–1725)

Aria "Vaga rosa tenerella" for voice, viola d'amore or viola and harpsichord or piano (1680); transcription by Louis van Waefelghem (1899)

- Andrea Lorenzo Scartazzini (b. 1971)

Cammina cammina for mezzo-soprano, viola and theorbo (1996); words by Giuseppe Ungaretti; Bärenreiter Verlag

- Giacinto Scelsi (1905–1988)

Cœlocanth, 3 Movements for viola solo (1955); Éditions Salabert
Elegia per Ty for viola and cello (1958); Éditions Salabert
Manto for a violist-singer (1957); Éditions Salabert
Three Studies for viola solo (1956); Éditions Salabert

- Theodor Schaefer (1904–1969)

Diathema for viola and orchestra, Op. 24 (1955–1956); Český Hudební Fond

- Bogusław Schaeffer (1929–2019

Concerto for viola and chamber orchestra (2004)
Concerto for viola and orchestra (1997); Collsch Edition
Kreuzweg 11 for saxophone, accordion, percussion and viola (2003)
Monophonie II for 13 violas (1997); Collsch Edition
Mouhadatsa for viola and cello (1985); Collsch Edition
Quartet for 4 violas (2006)
Salzburg Spectres for 4 violas (2005)
Sonata for viola solo (1991); Collsch Edition
Spring Music for viola and piano (1988); Collsch Edition

- R. Murray Schafer (1933–2021)

Buskers for flute, violin and viola (1985); Arcana Editions; Canadian Music Centre
Concerto for viola and orchestra (1997); Arcana Editions; Canadian Music Centre
Rounds for flute, violin and viola (1985); Canadian Music Centre

- Philipp Scharwenka (1847–1917)

Arie in F major for viola and piano or harmonium, Op. 51 (1883, 1897); originally for cello or violin and piano
Sonata Fantasia in G minor for viola and piano, Op. 106 (1898)
Trio No. 1 (Duo) in A minor (major) for violin, viola and piano, Op. 105 (1898)
Trio No. 2 in E minor for violin, viola and piano, Op. 121 (1915)

- Gerhard Schedl (1957–2000)

Concertino for viola and piano (1976); Verlag Doblinger
Concerto for viola and orchestra (1988); Verlag Doblinger

- Michael Schelle (b. 1950)

The Viola the Wind Swept Away for viola and chamber ensemble (2007)

- Friedrich Schenker (1942–2013)

Concerto for viola and orchestra (1975); Breitkopf und Härtel
Foglio I for viola and cello (1982); Deutscher Verlag für Musik; Breitkopf und Härtel

- Tona Scherchen (b. 1938)

Lien (恋) for viola solo (1973); Universal Edition
Tao for viola solo and orchestra (1971–1972); Universal Edition
Yun-yu (云雨; Clouds and Rain; Nuages et pluie) for violin or viola and vibraphone (1974); Universal Edition

- Armin Schibler (1920–1986)

Ballade for viola and piano, Op. 54 (1957); Edition Kunzelmann
Fantasie for viola and chamber orchestra, Op. 15 (1945); Ahn & Simrock
Kleines Konzert for viola solo, Op. 9d (1951); Ahn & Simrock
Weil alles erneut sich begibt for low voice, viola and piano, Op. 23 (1949); Edition Eulenburg

- Peter Schickele (b. 1935); see also P.D.Q. Bach

Deep Funk, Part 2, Dance Sonata for solo viola (2002); Theodore Presser Company
Monochrome IV for 6 violas (1974); Theodore Presser Company
Little London Trio for 2 violins and viola (1985); Theodore Presser Company
Little Suite for Autumn for violin and viola (1979); Theodore Presser Company
River Music for viola and cello (1993); Theodore Presser Company
Top o' the Millennium for 2 violas (2000); available from composer
Windows, Three Pieces for viola and guitar (1966); Theodore Presser Company

- David Schiff (b. 1945)

Joycesketch II for solo viola (1981); MMB Music

- Helmut Schiff (1918–1982)

Sonata for viola and piano (1960); Doblinger

- Hans Schläger (1820–1885)

Nachtstück (Night Piece) in C minor for viola (or cello) and piano, Op. 32 (1872)

- Thomas Daniel Schlee (1957–2025)

Alba for flute and viola, Op. 26 (1986); Éditions Henry Lemoine
De Profundis for viola and double bass, Op. 43 (2000); Éditions Henry Lemoine

- Martin Schlumpf (b. 1947); Martin Schlumpf website

"... per la quinta vox..." for viola solo (1986)
Spiegelbilder for viola, cello and piano (2013)
Trio for flute, viola and harp (1970)

- Heinrich Kaspar Schmid (1874–1953)

Sonata for viola and piano, Op. 111 (1941)
Trio for clarinet, viola and piano, Op. 114 (1944)
Trio for flute, viola and piano, Op. 109 (1940)

- William Schmidt (1926–2009)

Sonata Breve for flute, clarinet and viola (c.1966); Western International Music
Sonata in Two Movements for viola and piano (1968); Avant Music; Western International Music

- Thomas Schmidt-Kowalski (1949–2013)

Concerto in F♯ minor for viola and orchestra, Op. 111 (2010)
Duo in D major for violin and viola, Op. 43 (1992)
Duo in C major for horn and viola, Op. 65 No. 2 (1998)
Élégie in F♯ minor for viola and orchestra, Op. 107 (2007–2008)
3 Fantasiestücke (3 Fantasy Pieces) in C major for viola and piano, Op. 55 (1992)
Konzertantes Duo in Form einer frei variierten Passacaglia (Duo Concertante in the Form of a Freely Varied Passacaglia) for violin and viola, Op. 52 (1994)
Sonata in C major for viola and piano, Op. 39 (1992)

- Florent Schmitt (1870–1958)

Légende for viola and orchestra, Op. 66 (1918); Éditions Durand

- Joseph Schmitt (1734–1791)

Concerto in C major for viola and orchestra

- Artur Schnabel (1882–1951)

3 Fantasiestücke (3 Fantasy Pieces) for violin, viola and piano (1898)

- Georg Abraham Schneider (1770–1839)

Concerto in C major for viola and orchestra (1799)
Duo in D major for viola and cello, Op. 15
3 Duos for viola with violin accompaniment, Op. 30
3 Duos for violin and viola, Op. 44; F.E.C. Leuckart
3 Grands duos concertants for violin and viola, Op. 4 (c.1795)
Sinfonia Concertante in D major for violin, viola and orchestra, Op. 19
3 Sonatas for viola with violin accompaniment, Op. 18
6 Solos for alto viola, Op. 19 (1804)

- Michael Schneider (b. 1964)

Es werde Licht (Let There Be Light) for viola solo (2000); Édition Musicale Suisse
Shark Turtle Ray for oboe, viola and guitar (1998–1999); Édition Musicale Suisse

- Alfred Schnittke (1934–1998)

Concerto for viola and orchestra (1985); Hans Sikorski
Herrn Alfred Schlee zum 90. Geburstag (For the 90th Birthday of Alfred Schlee) for solo viola (1991); Universal Edition
Konzert zu dritt (Concerto for Three) for violin, viola, cello and chamber orchestra (1994); Hans Sikorski
Monologue for viola and string orchestra (1989); Hans Sikorski
Piece (Concerto) for viola and chamber orchestra (1997)
Sonata No. 1 for cello and piano (1978); arrangement for viola and string orchestra by Yuri Bashmet

- Othmar Schoeck (1886–1957)

Andante for clarinet or viola and piano; Hug Musikverlage

- Paul Schoenfield (b. 1947)

Concerto for viola and orchestra (1997–1998); Migdal Publishing

- Johannes Schöllhorn (b. 1962)

musarion for viola solo (1985–1986); Éditions Henry Lemoine

- Robert Schollum (1913–1987)

Chaconne for viola and piano, Op. 54a (1954); Verlag Doblinger
3 kleine Stücke (3 Little Pieces) for viola and piano, Op. 125 (1987); Verlag Doblinger
Sonate for viola and piano, Op. 42 No. 2 (1950); Verlag Doblinger
Sonatine for viola and piano, Op. 57 No. 2 (1962); Verlag Doblinger
3 Stücke for flute, violin, viola and string orchestra, Op. 51a; Verlag Doblinger

- Carl Siegemund Schönebeck (1758–1804)

3 Duos for viola and cello, Op. 2 (1798); Amadeus Verlag
3 konzertante Duos (3 Concertante Duos) for 2 violas, Op. 13

- Ruth Schönthal (1924–2006)

Duo for clarinet or viola and cello (2002); Furore Verlag
Four Epiphanies for unaccompanied viola (1976); Oxford University Press
Sonata Concertante for cello or viola or clarinet and piano (1973); Furore Verlag
Two Duets for violin and viola (2002); Furore Verlag

- Hans-Hubert Schönzeler (1925–1997)

Sonata for viola and piano, Op. 5 (1975); Edition Eulenburg

- Hanning Schröder (1896–1987)

Divertimento for viola and cello (1963); Edition Peters
Duo-Sonate for flute (or violin) and viola (1955); Verlag Friedrich Hofmeister
Ein-zwei-dreistimmige Kammermusik (One-, Two-, and Three-Voiced Chamber Music) for 2 violins and viola (1968); Edition Peters
Musik in 5 Sätzen (Music in 5 Movements) for viola solo (1954); Robert Lienau Musikverlag
Serenade for 3 violas; Edition Peters
Variationen über das Volkslied "Ach bittrer Winter" (Variations on the German Folk Song "Ach bittrer Winter") for viola and cello (1950); Robert Lienau Musikverlag

- Hermann Schroeder (1904–1984)

Duo for violin and viola (1979)
Sonata for viola solo (1974); Musikverlage Gerig; Breitkopf und Härtel
Concerto in A major for viola and orchestra, Op. 45 (1970); Musikverlage Gerig; Breitkopf und Härtel

- François Schubert (1808–1878)

La Solitude, Étude d'expression for viola and piano; arrangement by Casimir Ney (published ca. 1851)

- Franz Schubert (1797–1828)

Ave Maria (1825); transcription for viola and piano by William Primrose; Edition Schott
Impromptu in G major, Op. 90 No. 3 (1827); transcription for viola and piano by Vadim Borisovsky
La Solitude (Einsamkeit), Mélodie de Schubert for viola and piano, D. 620 (1818); original for voice and piano; transcription by Casimir Ney
Litany for All Souls' Day (Litanei auf das Fest Aller Seelen), D. 343 (1816); transcription for viola and piano by William Primrose; Edition Schott
Sonata in A minor "Arpeggione" for viola and piano, D. 821 (1824); original for arpeggione and piano

- Joseph Schubert (1754–1837)

Concerto in C major for viola and orchestra

- Zikmund Schul (1916–1944)

Duo for violin and viola (1943); Bote & Bock
2 Chasidské tance (2 Chassidic Dances) for viola and cello, Op. 15 (1941–1942); Bote & Bock

- Erwin Schulhoff (1894–1942)

Concertino for flute, viola and double bass (1925); Universal Edition

- Gunther Schuller (1925–2015)

Concerto for viola and orchestra (1985); Associated Music Publishers

- Andrew Schultz (b. 1960)

Attack for viola solo (1990); Wirripang; Australian Music Centre
Duo Variations for viola and piano (1990); Australian Music Centre
Master Mariner, Dead at Sea for viola and piano (2005); Wirripang; Australian Music Centre
Stick Dance II for clarinet, viola and piano (1989, revised 2005); Australian Music Centre

- Robert Schumann (1810–1856)

Märchenbilder (Fairy Tale Pictures) for viola and piano, Op. 113 (1851)
Märchenerzählungen, 4 movements for clarinet, viola and piano, Op. 132 (1853)

- William Schuman (1910–1992)

Concerto on Old English Rounds for viola, female chorus and orchestra (1974); Theodore Presser Company

- Gerard Schurmann (1924–2020)

Canzonetta for viola and piano (2010); Novello

- Meinrad Schütter (1910–2006)

Duo Concertante "Quasi una Fantasia" for violin, viola and orchestra (1966)
Fragment for viola and piano (1957, 1997)
Humoreske (Hommage à Francis Poulenc) for viola and piano (1989, 1996); original for clarinet and piano
Serenade "Gute Nacht, gute Nacht! Liebchen sieh" for soprano, flute and viola (1934)
Widmung (Dedication) for 2 violins and viola (1969)

- Kurt Schwaen (1909–2007)

Sechs Variationen für 2 Saiteninstrumente (6 Variations for 2 String Instruments) for violin and viola, KSV 545 (1990)
Serenata for 4 violas (solo viola and 3 tutti violas), KSV 607/3 (1998); original for 4 violins; Verlag Neue Musik
Weiße Katze / Schnurrige Geschichte for viola and piano, KSV 381a (1975); Verlag Neue Musik

- Elliott Schwartz (1936–2016)

Alto Prisms for 8 violas (1997); American Composers Alliance
Aria No. 3 for viola and woodblocks (1972); Carl Fischer
Aria with Interruptions for viola and percussion (1993); American Composers Alliance
Echo Music I for clarinet, viola and self-prepared tape (1977); Carl Fischer
Suite for viola and piano (1963); Norruth-MMB
Three Inventions in a Name for viola solo (1985); American Composers Alliance
Vienna Dreams for clarinet, viola and piano (1998); American Composers Alliance

- Cornelius Schwehr (b. 1953)

acompagnato (mutuo) for viola and accordion (2001); Breitkopf & Härtel
à nous deux, Concerto for viola, piano and orchestra (1995); Breitkopf & Härtel

- Alfred Schweizer (b. 1941)

Dorischer Gesang for baritone, cello (or viola, or horn) and piano (1996); Müller & Schade
Glasfarbenmusik, Chamber Music for soprano, viola and organ (2003); Müller & Schade
Juli. "Jodel" from the cycle Das Jahr in naiver Musik for violin and viola (1976–1996); Müller & Schade
Lydischer Gesang for soprano or mezzo-soprano, violin or viola and piano (1999); Müller & Schade
Musik for viola solo (2001); Müller & Schade

- Rolf Schweizer (1936–2016)

Hymnus I for viola and percussion (1988); Edition Dohr
Hymnus II for viola solo (1989); Edition Dohr

- Kurt Schwertsik (b. 1935)

Haydn Lived in Eisenstadt for viola and piano, Op. 122 (2020); Boosey & Hawkes

- Salvatore Sciarrino (b. 1947)

Ai limiti della notte for viola solo (1979); G. Ricordi
3 Duetti con l'eco for flute, viola and bassoon (2006); Edizioni Musicali Rai Trade
La malinconia for violin and viola (1980); G. Ricordi
3 Notturni brillanti for viola solo (1974); G. Ricordi

- Stefano Scodanibbio (1956–2012)

Composte terre for violin and viola (1991–1992)
Humboldt for viola and double bass (1993–1994, revised 1997)
Quodlibet for viola and cello (1991)
Tre Impromptu (3 Impromptus) for viola solo (1986–1989)

- Flavio Emilio Scogna (b. 1956)

Color for viola solo (2005)
Diaphonia for viola solo, string orchestra and piano (1991); Edizioni Musicali RCA; Ricordi
Incanto for 2 violins and viola (1985); Edizioni Musicali RCA; Ricordi

- Cyril Scott (1879–1970)

Cherry Ripe for viola and piano (1911); original for violin and piano; arranged by Lionel Tertis
Fantasia for viola and piano (ca.1911); incomplete
Sonata for viola and piano (1939, revised 1953)

- Alexander Scriabin (1872–1915)

Prélude in C♯ minor, Op. 9 No. 1 (1894); 1931 transcription for viola and piano by Vadim Borisovsky; Paul Günther; International Music Company; Declaration of Love: Album of Popular Pieces for Viola and Piano (Страстное Признание: Альбом Популярных Пьес), Muzyka

- Peter Sculthorpe (1929–2014)

Elegy for viola and string orchestra (2006); Faber Music
Parting for viola and piano (2000); Faber Music
Sonata for viola and percussion (1960); Faber Music
A Song for Fé for viola and piano (2005); Faber Music
Tailitnama Song for viola solo (1974, 2000) or viola and piano (2000); Faber Music

=== Se ===
- Peter Seabourne (b. 1960)

Pietà for viola and piano (2007)
Freeing the Angel for viola and piano (2019)

- Walter Sear (1930–2010)

Sonata for viola solo

- Mátyás Seiber (1905–1960)

Elegy for viola and small orchestra (1951–1953); Edition Schott

- Albert Seitz (1872–1937)

Fantaisie de concert in D minor for viola and piano, Op. 31 (1904); Éditions Alphonse Leduc

- Bernhard Sekles (1872–1934)

Chaconne über ein achttaktiges Marschthema (Chaconne on an Eight-Beat March Theme) for viola and piano, Op. 38 (1931); C.F. Peters

- Ronald Senator (1926–2015)

Polish Suite for viola solo (1991); Alfred Lengnick

- José Serebrier (b. 1938)

Sonata for Viola Alone (1955); Southern Music Publishing

- Raminta Šerkšnytė (b. 1975)

Nuojautos (Presentiments) for flute, viola and 1~4 prepared pianos (2002); Lithuanian Music Information and Publishing Centre
Žvelgiant į pasąmonę (Looking at the Subconscious) for flute and viola (1997); Lithuanian Music Information and Publishing Centre

- Tibor Serly (1901–1978)

La Bandoline for viola and piano (1947); transcription from François Couperin's Pièces de clavecin, 1er livre
Concerto for viola and orchestra (1929); Sprague-Coleman; Peer Music
David of the White Rock for viola solo; Sprague-Coleman
Rhapsody on Folk Songs Harmonized by Béla Bartók for viola and orchestra (1946); Peer Music
Sonata in Modus Lascivus for viola solo (1948); Southern Music Publishing

- Mordecai Seter (1916–1994)

Elegy (אלגיה) for viola and piano or string orchestra (1954); Israel Music Institute
Monodrama (מונודרמה) for viola and piano (1977); original for clarinet and piano from Chamber Music '70; Israel Music Institute
Ricercar (ריצ'רקאר) for violin, viola, cello and string orchestra without double bass (1956); Israel Music Institute
Two Ballades and Virelais by Solage (fl. 1370–1390) (שתי בלדות ווירלי מאת סולאז) for flute, viola and harp, or flute, trumpet, viola and cello; Israel Music Institute
Two Ballades by Jacob de Senleches (fl. 1378–1395) (שתי בלדות מאת ג'קוב דה סנלצ'ס) for viola, cello and harp; Israel Music Institute

- John Laurence Seymour (1893–1986)

Elegiac Tone Poem No. 2 in F minor for viola and piano (1946); Banner Play Bureau

=== Sh ===
- Stepan Shakaryan (1935–2019)

Theme and Variations (Тема с вариациями) for viola and piano (1959)

- Ralph Shapey (1921–2002)

Duo for viola and piano (1957); Theodore Presser Company
Evocation No. 3 for viola and piano (1981); Theodore Presser Company
Mann Duo for violin and viola (1983); Theodore Presser Company
Night Music No. 2 for violin/viola (one player) and tape (2001); Theodore Presser Company
Poeme for viola and percussion (1966); Theodore Presser Company
Variations for Viola and Nine Players (1987); Theodore Presser Company

- Alex Shapiro (b. 1962)

Desert Waves for 5-string electric violin (or viola) and electronic soundscape on CD (2001); Activist Music
Evolve for 5-string electric viola and electronic soundscape on CD (2006); Activist Music
Of String and Touch for viola and piano (2006); Activist Music

- Vache Sharafyan (b. 1966)

Luminous Silhouette of a Song for clarinet (or viola) and chamber orchestra (2008); Editions BIM
Path Towards This Moment for viola and organ (2012)
Sonata-Fantasy for viola and piano (2010)
Suite for viola and string orchestra with oboe (2009)
Surgite Gloriae, Concerto for viola and orchestra with duduk, descant (singer), and baritone (2005)
Vi-O-La No. 1 for viola solo (2008); A-RAM, Moscow
Vi-O-La No. 2 for viola solo (2009); A-RAM, Moscow
Light-Drop Peals for soprano and viola (2009); words by Matsuo Bashō
Waterfall Music for mix chorus with optional viola (2011)

- Judith Shatin (b. 1949)

Arche for viola and orchestra (1974)
Doxa for viola and piano (1989); MMB Music
Glyph for solo viola, string quartet and piano (1984); MMB Music
L'étude du Cœur for viola solo (1983, revised 1987); C.F. Peters
Sister Thou Wast Mild and Lovely for soprano and viola (1994); American Composers Alliance
Wedding Song for soprano and English horn (or alto flute, or clarinet, or viola) (1987); American Composers Alliance

- Caroline Shaw (b. 1982)

in manus tuas for cello or viola solo (2009)

- Rodion Shchedrin (1932–2025)

Concerto Dolce for viola, string orchestra and harp, Op. 102 (1997); Schott Music

- Alexander Shchetynsky (b. 1960)

Sonata for viola solo (1985–1987); Le Chant du Monde
Four Movements (Чотири рухи) for clarinet, viola and piano (1996)
Two Songs of a Wayfaring Philosopher (Дві пісні мандрованого філософа) for mezzo-soprano and viola d'amore or viola (2000, 2001)

- Vissarion Shebalin (1902–1963)

Sonata in F minor for viola and piano, Op. 51 No. 2 (1954); Muzgiz; Röhr, Frankfurt
Sonata in E minor for violin and viola, Op. 35 (1940–1944); Gosudarstvennoe muzykalnoe izdatelstvo (State Music Publishing House); Leeds Music

- Bright Sheng (b. 1955)

Angel Fire Duo for violin and viola (2014); G. Schirmer
The Stream Flows for viola solo (1988); G. Schirmer
Three Chinese Love Songs for soprano, viola and piano (1988); G. Schirmer
Three Pieces for viola and piano (1986); G. Schirmer

- Noam Sheriff (1935–2018)

Canarian Vespers for viola and string orchestra (2009); Edition Peters
Partita (ליגור – פרטיטה) for viola and cello (1984); Israel Music Institute; Edition Peters

- Robert Sherlaw Johnson (1932–2000)

Intersections for viola and piano (1988); Oxford University Press

- Hifumi Shimoyama (b. 1930)

Duplication (デュプリケーション) for viola and guitar (2009)

- Motoyuki Shitanda (b. 1952)

Concerto for viola and orchestra (1998)
Retrospection (追憶 Tsuioku) for viola and piano (1997); Japan Federation of Composers

- Gil Shohat (b. 1973)

Anekdotos III: Rêverie et Cauchmard for viola solo (2000); Gil Shohat Editions
Concerto for viola and orchestra (1998); Ricordi
The Devil's Dance, Ballet for violin and viola (2006); Gil Shohat Editions
Duo-Sonata for violin and viola; Gil Shohat Editions
Five Songs of Darkness for soprano, viola and piano (1990); Gil Shohat Editions

- Vladislav Shoot (1941–2022)

Mini-Partita (Мини-партита) for viola and piano (1987)

- Bernard Shore (1896–1984)

Scherzo for viola and piano; Augener

- Dmitri Shostakovich (1906–1975)

Sonata for viola and piano, Op. 147 (1975); G. Schirmer; DSCH
Adagio; transcription for viola and piano by Vadim Borisovsky; Sovetsky Kompozitor (1962)
Impromptu (Экспромт) for viola and piano, Op. 33 [sic] (1931); DSCH
Pieces from The Gadfly (Пьесы из музыки к кинофильму "Овод"), Op. 97 (1955); transcriptions for viola and piano by Vadim Borisovsky; Muzyka (1964); DSCH

Overture
Romance
Contra-dance
Barrel-Organ Waltz
Nocturne
Galop

Spring Waltz (Весенний Вальс); transcription for viola and piano by Vadim Borisovsky; Sovietsky Kompozitor (1962)

- Petros Shoujounian (b. 1957)

Arévagale (Rising Sun), Trio for viola, bassoon and horn (1991); Canadian Music Centre
Monologue 1 for viola solo (1985); Doberman-Yppan; Canadian Music Centre

- Hugh Shrapnel (b. 1947)

Variations for viola solo (1985)

- Alan Shulman (1915–2002)

Homage to Erik Satie for viola and piano (1938)
Piece in Popular Style for viola and piano (1939)
Theme and Variations in B minor for viola, strings and harp (1940)
Suite for solo viola (1953); Templeton Publishing
Night for viola quartet (1978)
Ancora for viola quartet (1978)
Variations for viola, strings and harp (1981, revised 1984)

- Aleksandr Shymko (b. 1977)

The Book of Night Secrets (Книга таємниць ночі) for flute, viola and harp (2005)
Double Concerto (Двойной концерт) for violin, viola and orchestra (2013–2014)

=== Si ===
- Jean Sibelius (1865–1957)

Duo in C major for violin and viola, JS 66 (c.1891–1892); Edition Fazer; Fennica Gehrman; Boosey & Hawkes
Rondo in D minor for viola and piano, JS 162 (1893); Warner/Chappell Music

- Nikolai Sidelnikov (1930–1992)

Sonata-Elegia (Соната-элегия) for viola solo (1978); Muzyka

- Otto Siegl (1896–1978)

Concertino in E minor for viola and string quartet, Op. 124; manuscript
Duo Sonata in G major for viola and cello, Op. 139 (1949); Doblinger Verlag
Duo Sonatina in F major for violin and viola, Op. 138 (1949); Doblinger Verlag
Gesänge (Songs) for soprano, viola and piano, Op. 112; Anton Böhm & Sohn
Sonata No. 1 for viola and piano, Op. 41 (1925); Doblinger Verlag
Sonata No. 2 in E♭ major for viola and piano, Op. 103 (1938); Doblinger Verlag
Volkslieder (Folk Songs) for soprano, viola and piano, Op. 113; Anton Böhm & Sohn
Weihnachts-Sonate (Christmas Sonata) in D major for viola and organ, Op. 137 (1944); Doblinger Verlag

- Elie Siegmeister (1909–1991)

Songs of Experience for voice, viola and piano (1979); words by William Blake; C. Fischer
Summer for viola and piano (1978)

- Roberto Sierra (b. 1953)

Concerto for viola, string orchestra and percussion (2006); Subito Music
Doble Concierto (Double Concerto) for violin, viola and orchestra (2003); Subito Music

- Þorkell Sigurbjörnsson (1938–2013)

Farewell for flute, viola and harp (2007); Íslenzk Tónverkamiðstöð
Intrada: Invitation to a Bath for clarinet, viola and piano (1971); Íslenzk Tónverkamiðstöð
Kisum for clarinet, viola and piano (1970); Íslenzk Tónverkamiðstöð
Six Icelandic Folk-Songs (Sex íslensk Þjóðlög) for viola and piano (1969); Íslenzk Tónverkamiðstöð
Skref fyrir skref (Step-by-Step) for viola solo (1986); Íslenzk Tónverkamiðstöð

- Sheila Silver (b. 1946)

Lullaby for bassoon (or viola) and piano (2004)

- Faye-Ellen Silverman (b. 1947)

Memories for solo viola (1974); Seesaw Music
Troubled Repose for flute, viola and double bass (1998); Seesaw Music
Wilde's World for tenor, viola and guitar (2000); Seesaw Music

- Valentin Silvestrov (b. 1937)

Epitaph L.B. (Епітафія Л.Б.; Epitaphium L.B.) for viola (or cello) and piano (1999); M.P. Belaieff
Lacrimosa for viola (or cello) solo (2004)

- Thomas Simaku (b. 1958)

a2 for viola and cello (2008); University of York Music Press
Soliloquy III for viola solo (2002); University of York Music Press
Tanglewood Trio for clarinet, viola and piano (1996); Emerson Edition

- Stasys Šimkus (1887–1943)

Lopšinė (Lullaby) for viola and piano; published by Vaga, Vilnius (1966), in Dvi pjesės altui su fortepijonu (2 Pieces for Viola and Piano)

- Achille Simonetti (1859–1928)

Allegretto Romantico in D minor for viola and piano (published 1897)
Ballata in C minor for viola and piano (published 1897)

- Netty Simons (1913–1994)

Facets No. 3 for viola or oboe and piano (1962); Merion Music; Theodore Presser Company
Songs for Wendy for voice and viola (c.1975); Merion Music; Theodore Presser Company
Trialogue I: The Tombstone Told When She Died for alto, baritone and viola (1963); words by Dylan Thomas; Merion Music; Theodore Presser Company
Trialogue II: Myselves Grieve for alto, baritone and viola (1969); words by Dylan Thomas; Merion Music; Theodore Presser Company
Trialogue III: Now (Now, Say Nay) for mezzo-soprano, baritone and viola (1973); words by Dylan Thomas; Merion Music; Theodore Presser Company

- Ezra Sims (1928–2015)

— and, as I was saying, ... for viola solo (1979); Diapason Press; American Composers Alliance; Frogpeak
Concert Piece for viola solo with flute, clarinet, cello and small orchestra (1990); Frogpeak
Duo for viola and cello (1996)
Duo '97 for clarinet and viola (1997)
— furthermore ... for clarinet and viola (2005); Frogpeak
The Lullaby in Come Away for mezzo-soprano and viola (or violin) (1980); American Composers Alliance; Frogpeak
Song for mezzo-soprano, clarinet and viola (1980); Frogpeak
5 Songs for alto and viola (1979); American Composers Alliance; Frogpeak
Two for One for violin and viola (1980); Composer Facsimile Edition; Frogpeak

- Jeanne Singer (1924–2000)

Recollections of City Island for oboe, viola and piano (1984)
Sonnet for voice, violin and clarinet (or viola) (1985); Accentuate Music

- Alvin Singleton (b. 1940)

Argoru IV for viola solo (1978); European American Music
Mookestueck for 5-string electric viola (1999); Schott Music

- Larry Sitsky (b. 1934)

Improvisation and Cadenza for solo viola (1964); Wirripang; Australian Music Centre
2 Pieces for viola solo (2006); Keys Press; Australian Music Centre
1. Diaspora
2. Niggun
7 Zen Songs for voice and viola (2005); Keys Press; Australian Music Centre

- Hans Sitt (1850–1922)

6 Albumblätter (Album Leaves) for viola and piano, Op. 39 (1891)
Concerto in A minor for viola and orchestra, Op. 68 (1900)
Concertstück (Concert Piece) in G minor for viola and piano, Op. 46 (1892), or viola and orchestra (1899)
15 Etudes for viola solo, Op. 116 (1913)
24 Etudes for viola solo, Op. 32; original for violin
3 Fantasiestücke (3 Fantasy Pieces) for viola and piano, Op. 58 (1894)
Gavotte und Mazurka for viola and piano, Op. 132 (1919)
Konzertstück: Allegro appassionato, Romanze und Tarantelle for violin or viola and orchestra (or piano), Op. 119 (1916)
Romance in G minor for viola and orchestra, Op. 72 (1900)
Romanze in D minor for viola and piano, Op. 102 No. 1 (1909); original from Drei Stücke (3 Pieces) for violin and piano; transcription by the composer
3 Stücke (3 Pieces) for viola and piano, Op. 75 (1901)

- Pavel Šivic (1908–1995)

Narodna (Folk Tune) for viola and piano (1972); Edicije Društva Slovenskih Skladateljev

- Fredrik Sixten (b. 1962)

Mesto for viola and piano (1982); Gehrmans Musikförlag

- Nikos Skalkottas (1904–1949)

Concerto for violin, viola and wind orchestra, A/K25 (1939); Margun Music
Duo for violin and viola, A/K45 (1938); Universal Edition

- Howard Skempton (b. 1947)

Intermezzo for viola and horn (1978)
Moto perpetuo for viola solo (1993)
Only the Sound Remains for viola and chamber ensemble (2010); Oxford University Press
Pavillon for clarinet, viola and piano (2006)

- Lucijan Marija Škerjanc (1900–1973)

Elegija (Elegy) for viola and piano
Koncertantna rapsodija (Concertant Rhapsody) for viola and orchestra (1959)

- Yngve Sköld (1899–1992)

Adagio patetico for viola and piano (1920); Swedish Music Information Centre
Alla leggenda for viola and organ, Op. 31 (1931); Swedish Music Information Centre
Consolation for viola and organ or small orchestra (1945); Swedish Music Information Centre
Elegie for violin, viola and organ (1926); Swedish Music Information Centre
Fantasi (Fantasy) for viola and organ, Op. 12 (1919); Swedish Music Information Centre
Impromptu for horn or viola and piano, Op. 76 (1979); Swedish Music Information Centre
Klassisk svit (Classical Suite) for violin and viola (1945); Swedish Music Information Centre
Legend for viola and orchestra, Op. 9 (c.1917); Swedish Music Information Centre
Romans (Romance) for viola and piano (1916); Swedish Music Information Centre
Serenad for piccolo, violin and viola, Op. 27 (1927); Swedish Music Information Centre
Sonata for viola and organ (or piano), Op. 62 (1962); Swedish Music Information Centre
Sonatina for flute and viola; Swedish Music Information Centre
Suite Concertante for viola and orchestra, Op. 35 (1936); Swedish Music Information Centre

- Bettina Skrzypczak (b. 1962)

Arcato for viola solo (2000); Ricordi Verlag, München
Landschaft des Augenblicks, 5 Songs for mezzo-soprano, viola and piano (1991–1992); Ricordi Verlag, München

- Scott Slapin (b. 1974)

12 Divertimenti for 2 violas, student and teacher (2015); Violacentric Publications
24 Etudes for 2 violas, student and teacher; Ourtext Edition
Ballade for 2 violas (2016); Violacentric Publications
Capricious: In Memory of Emanuel Vardi for 3 violas (2011); American Viola Society
Cremonus in Italy for 4 violas or viola ensemble (2017); Violacentric Publications

1. Part I Cremonus Goes to the Movies
2. Part II Reflection at the Chiesa di Cremono
3. Part III Concert of ex-Soviet Violists in the Piazza del Duomo
4. Part IV Cremonus Attempts a Tarantella After Too Much Vino Rosso, Reminisces About the Movies

Cremonus' Revenge for 2 or 8 solo violas and full orchestra, 3 movements (2017); Violacentric Publications
Dead of Winter for 2 violas (2016); Violacentric Publications
Dialogues and Duels for viola ensemble, from Violacentrism the Opera (2015); Ourtext Edition
Elegy for 2 violas and doublebass (2006)
Fanfare for a New Library for 2 violas (2016); Violacentric Publications
Fanfare for an Old Library for 2 violas (2016); Violacentric Publications
Fanfare for Cremonus for 4 violas or viola ensemble (2017); Violacentric Publications
Fantasia in C Minor for solo viola (2016); Violacentric Publications
Five Pieces for a Memorial Concert (2008)

1. In Memoriam; for My Mother, Margi for 2 violas; Ourtext Edition
2. Elegy-Caprice for viola solo; Ourtext Edition
3. Intermezzo for flute and 2 violas; Ourtext Edition
4. Serenade for 2 violas
5. Postlude for viola and string quintet or orchestra; American Viola Society

The Ill-Tempered Violist for solo viola (2016); Violacentric Publications
Music History 101 at 9 am for 3 violas (2015); Ourtext Edition
Nocturne in Memory of Richard Lane, Duo for 2 violas (2004); Ourtext Edition
Polysemic Rhapsody for viola and cello (2017); Violacentric Publications
Prelude for 2 violas (2016); Violacentric Publications
Recitative for viola solo (2007); Liben Music Publishers
Sketches for 4 violas or viola ensemble (2011); Ourtext Edition
Soliloquy for viola solo (2007)
Sonata in C for 2 violas, 3 movements (2016); Violacentric Publications
Sonata in G for violin and viola (2016); Violacentric Publications
Sonatina for 2 violas, 4 movements (2016); Violacentric Publications
Suite for 2 violas, or viola solo with viola ensemble (2007); Ourtext Edition; American Viola Society
Suspension for 2 violas (2016); Violacentric Publications
Three Contrasts for Two Violas for 2 violas, 3 movements (2016); Violacentric Publications
Threnody and Reverie for viola and piano (2017); Violacentric Publications
Trio Sonata for viola, alto sax (or viola), and piano (2016); Violacentric Publications
Triptych (1997)

1. A Crooked Dance for viola, cello and doublebass
2. A Lament for viola and cello
3. The Hassid and the Hayseed for viola and cello; Ourtext Edition

Two Processionals for 2 violas (2006)
A Viola Audition for 4 violas or viola ensemble (2017); Violacentric Publications
Violacentrism The Opera for 2 violas (2015); Violacentric Publications

1. Overture for 2 violas
2. The Raging Waves of Babylon for solo viola
3. Three Arias for 2 violas
4. Music History 101 for 2 violas
5. The Sounds of Hampshire County for 2 violas
6. Violist Under the Roof for 2 violas
7. Dialogues and Duels for 2 violas

Viola Demo for 2 violas (2012)
Violist Under the Roof for string trio (2017); Violacentric Publications
Yizkor for 2 violas (2016); Violacentric Publications

- Klement Slavický (1910–1999)

Rhapsodie for solo viola (1987); Český Hudební Fond

- Sergei Slonimsky (1932–2020)

3 Graces: Suite in the Form of Variations after Botticelli, Rodin and Picasso (Три грации, Сюита в форме вариаций по мотивам Ботичелли, Родена и Пикассо) for viola and piano (2002); Compozitor Publishing House
2 Pieces (Две пьесы) for viola and piano (1956); Muzgiz
Suite for viola and piano (1959); Sovietsky Kompozitor
Tragicomedy (Трагикомедия), Concerto for viola and chamber orchestra (2005); Compozitor Publishing House

- Dmitri Smirnov (1948–2020)

Adagiosissimo after J.S. Bach for violin, viola and harp, Op. 36b (1997); Meladina Press
Chaconne for violin, viola and harp, Op. 131 (2001); Meladina Press
The Farewell Song (Прощальная Песнь) for viola and harp, Op. 37 (1982); Meladina Press; Hans Sikorski
The Last Word 1 for 2 violas and wind quintet (alto flute, oboe d'amour, bass clarinet, contrabassoon, horn), Op. 133 (2002); Meladina Press
The Last Word 1 for violin, viola (or 2 violas) and harp, Op. 133a (2002); Meladina Press
Pro et contra (За и против), 2 Pieces for viola and piano (2014)
Shadows in Light (Освещённые Тени) for viola and harp, Op. 122 (1999); Meladina Press; Sibelius Music

- Leo Smit (1900–1943)

Concerto for viola and string orchestra (1940); Donemus
Trio for clarinet, viola and piano (1938); Donemus
Trio for flute, viola and harp (1926); Donemus

- Leo Smit (1921–1999)

Alone for female violist/reciter (1988); poem by Emily Dickinson; Theodore Presser Company
Petals of Amaranth, 10 Pieces for viola and piano (1995)
Scena Cambiata for trombone, viola and cello (1980)

- Dave Smith (b. 1949)

Zosonata for viola solo (1993)

- David Stanley Smith (1877–1949)

Sonata for viola and piano, Op. 72 (1934)

- Julia Smith (1905–1989)

Two Pieces for viola and piano (1966); Mowbray Music Publishers; Theodore Presser Company

- Leland Smith (1925–2013)

Sonata for heckelphone or viola and piano (1953); San Andreas Press
Suite for solo viola (1948); San Andreas Press

- Stuart Saunders Smith (b. 1948)

Three for Two for violin and viola (1972); Smith Publications

- Michael Smither (b. 1939)

Four Pieces for violin and viola (1974); Centre for New Zealand Music

- Ethel Smyth (1858–1944)

Two Interlinked French Folk Melodies for violin or viola and piano (1927); Oxford University Press

=== So ===
- Gintaras Sodeika (b. 1961)

Maranata for viola and string orchestra (2003)

- Ragnar Søderlind (b. 1945)

Concerto "Nostalgia delle radici" for viola and orchestra, Op. 86 (2002–2003); Music Information Centre Norway
Friesische Landschaft for viola and piano, Op. 78

- Lille Bror Söderlundh (1912–1957)

Siciliana seria for viola and string orchestra (1946); Swedish Music Information Centre
Zwei Inventionen (Two Inventions) for clarinet or viola and piano (organ ad libitum) (1955); Hans Busch Musikförlag; Swedish Music Information Centre

- Naresh Sohal (1939–2018)

Concerto for viola and orchestra (2002); Naresh Sohal Publications
Shades IV for viola solo (1982–1983); Novello & Co.

- Ivan Sokolov (b. 1960)

Elegy (Элегия) for viola solo (2001)
13 Postludes (13 Постлюдий) for viola and piano (2018)
Sonata for flute, viola and harp (2012)
Sonata in One Movement (Соната для альта и фортепиано. Одночастная) for viola and piano (2006)

- Juan María Solare (b. 1966)

Al octavo día (On the Eighth Day), Monologue for viola and piano (1993)
Ambos lados del ocaso (Both Sides of Twilight), Song for soprano and viola (1989)
Astat (Haiku Nr. 7) for viola solo (2009)
Bei jedem Wetter (Regardless of the Weather) for viola, cello and piano (2010)
Caminata nocturna (por Colonia) for 2 violas (2002, 2007); original for piano
Drooping Drops for viola, piano and tape (2001, 2006); original for bassoon, piano and tape
Hypnosis (in Another Room) for viola solo (2004)
Fricción for 2 violas (2010, 2011)
Lark in the Dark for 2 violas (2002, 2007); original for piano
Momificación de una rosa (Mummification of a Rose) for 1 or 2 violas (2004); original version for violin(s)
Nana for viola and cello (1997)
Paregamutiún (Friendship), 4 Pieces for viola solo (2010); original for cello solo
Reencuentro (Reunion) for viola and piano (2008–2010)
Sonatango for 4 violas (2002, 2008); original for piano
Temperamentos, 4 Pieces for viola and piano (2010, 2011)
Toccata y Fuga lejanas for viola and guitar (1987)
Tránsfuga, Tanguistic Fugue for violin and viola (2007, 2009) or for flute and viola (2010); original version for saxophone and piano
Trenodia for viola solo (1989)
Tres veces Dos Dúos (Three Times Two Duos), 6 Pieces for violin and viola (1994–1996)
Tríptico existencial for clarinet and viola (2010)
Vineta for viola and piano (2008, 2009); original for cello and piano
Un eremita for viola and piano (2005)

- Alessandro Solbiati (b. 1956)

Blütenstaub for violin, viola and piano (1982); Edizioni Suvini Zerboni
Corde for viola solo (1991); Edizioni Suvini Zerboni
Volo for soprano and viola (2005); Edizioni Suvini Zerboni

- Josep Soler i Sardà (1935–2022)

Aux soirs ensanglantés de roses... for viola and clarinet (1998)
Concerto for viola and orchestra (1979)
Pieza para viola sola for viola solo (1987)
Poema de Vilafranca for viola, oboe, English horn, organ and chamber orchestra (1995)
Sonata No. 1 "sobre un tema de Giuseppe Verdi" ("on a Theme of Giuseppe Verdi") for viola and piano (1993–1994); Clivis Publicacions
Sonata No. 2 for viola and piano
Variacions sobre un tema d'Alban Berg (Variations on a Theme of Alban Berg) for viola and piano (1979); Clivis Publicacions

- Harvey Sollberger (b. 1938)

Composition for viola and piano (1961); American Composers Alliance

- Giovanni Sollima (b. 1962)

Lamentatio for viola solo (1998); Casa Musicale Sonzogno

- Herbert Söllner (b. 1942)

Andante for violin and cello (or viola) (1992)
Cantus, Duo for viola and cello (1993)
Centum for violin and viola (1999)
Duo for viola and piano (1991)
Duo for violin and viola (1977, 1982)
Ende und Anfang (End and Beginning) for viola and harp (2003)
Kippenheimer Synagoge 2003 for violin, viola and double bass (2003)
Sonata for viola and piano (1987–1988)
Sonata for viola and piano (2004)
Tabea for viola solo (1980); G. Bosse-Verlag
Vier Lieder (4 Songs) for soprano, viola and piano (1982, 1992)

- Arthur Somervell (1863–1937)

School of Melody, 10 Progressive Tunes for viola and piano (1919); Augener

- József Soproni (1930–2021)

Concerto for viola and orchestra (1959); Zeneműkiadó Vállalat, Budapest; Editio Musica Budapest
Rapszódia (Rhapsody) for viola and piano (1984); Editio Musica Budapest
Sonatina for viola and piano (1958); Zeneműkiadó Vállalat, Budapest; Editio Musica Budapest

- Bent Sørensen (b. 1958)

Funeral Procession for violin, viola and chamber ensemble (1989); Edition Wilhelm Hansen
The Lady and the Lark for viola and ensemble (1997); Edition Wilhelm Hansen
The Lady of Shalott for viola solo (1987); Edition Wilhelm Hansen
Mondnacht for clarinet, viola and piano (2007); Edition Wilhelm Hansen
Sarabande for viola solo (2015); Edition Wilhelm Hansen
Schattenlinie for clarinet, viola and piano (2010); Edition Wilhelm Hansen

- Mauricio Sotelo (b. 1961)

Blanca Luz de Azahar for viola and piano (2016); Proyecto Sotelo
Muros de dolor... VII: Bulería for viola solo (2018); Universal Edition
Trio Basso for viola, cello and double bass (1899–1989); Ariadne Verlag

- Vladimír Soukup (1930–2012)

Sonata for viola and piano (1961); Český Hudební Fond

- Marcelle Soulage (1894–1970)

Sonata for viola and piano, Op. 25 (1919); Buffet-Crampon, Paris
Sonata in F major for viola solo, Op. 43 (1921); Buffet-Crampon, Paris

- André Souris (1899–1970)

Trois pièces anciennes for violin and viola (1965); CeBeDeM

- Tim Souster (1943–1994)

Songs of Three Seasons for soprano and viola (1965, revised 1977); 0dB Editions; British Music Information Centre
Spectral for viola and electronics (1972); 0dB Editions; British Music Information Centre

- Ann Southam (1937–2010)

Re-tuning for viola and tape (1985); Canadian Music Centre

- Leo Sowerby (1895–1968)

Ballade for viola and organ, H. 300 (1949); Fred Bock Music Publishers
Poem for viola and organ or orchestra, H. 258 (1941, orchestrated 1947); Sowerby Foundation; Theodore Presser Company
Sonata for clarinet or viola and piano, H. 240 (1938); Theodore Presser Company
Trio for flute, viola and piano, H. 149; Sowerby Foundation

- Bernadette Speach (b. 1948)

Embrace the Universe for mezzo-soprano, viola, piano, chorus and orchestra (2001)
Trio des trois II for flute, viola and harp (1991)
Trio des trois III for viola, cello and piano (1992)
Viola for viola and piano (1999)

- Johannes Matthias Sperger (1750–1812)

Concerto in E♭ major for viola and orchestra
Sonata No. 1 in D major for viola and double bass, T. 38, Meier C I/6 (C I/7?)
Sonata No. 2 in D major for viola and double bass, T. 39, Meier C I/9

- Claudio Spies (1925–2020)

Viopiacem, Duo for viola and piano or harpsichord (1965); Boosey & Hawkes

- Leo Spies (1899–1965)

Concerto in E minor for viola and piano (1961)
Fünf Sommerbilder (5 Summer Pictures) for viola and piano (1954); Breitkopf & Härtel

- Louis Spohr (1784–1859)

Grand Duo in E minor for violin and viola, Op. 13 (1809)
3 Duos for 2 violas, Op. 3; transcribed by Louis Pagels; Edition Praeger & Meier

- Norbert Sprongl (1892–1983)

Sonata for viola and piano, Op. 115 (1958); Doblinger Verlag
Suite for viola and piano, Op. 142
Vier Stücke (4 Pieces) for viola and piano, Op. 49

=== St ===
- Gerhard Stäbler (b. 1949)

Notebook for viola and orchestra (1996–2000); Ricordi
Schmerzprobe (Pain Test), Cassandra Study for solo viola (1993); Ricordi

- Marek Stachowski (1936–2004)

Concerto for viola and string orchestra (1998); Polskie Wydawnictwo Muzyczne

- Hans Stadlmair (1929–2019)

Drei Fantasien (3 Fantasies) for viola solo (1973); Henry Litolff's Verlag; C.F. Peters
Orpheus-Legende for viola and fortepiano (1993)
Sonata for viola solo (1960); Breitkopf & Härtel
Sonata da Chiesa for viola and organ (1981)

- Klaus Hinrich Stahmer (b. 1941)

Dedications, Concerto for viola, harp and string orchestra (1964, 1977); Möseler Wolfenbüttel
Mazewot for viola solo (2001); Verlag Neue Musik
One Stops Searching, One Grows Silent for viola and guitar (2009); Verlag Neue Musik
Rapsodia Piccola for alto saxophone (or viola) and piano (1976); Heinrichshofen's Verlag
Sonatina for violin and viola (1964); Möseler Wolfenbüttel
Threnos in Memoriam Paul Hindemith for viola and organ or piano (1963); N. Simrock

- Anton Stamitz (1750 or 1754–1798 or 1809)

Concerto in B♭ major for viola and orchestra

- Carl Stamitz (1745–1801)

Concerto No. 1 in D major for viola and orchestra, Op. 1 (published 1774)
Concerto No. 2 in B♭ major for viola and orchestra (c.1770); Gems Music Publications
Concerto No. 3 in A major for viola and orchestra; Gems Music Publications
6 Duos for 2 violas; Edition Schott
6 Duos for violin and viola, Op. 1; Amadeus Verlag
3 Duos for violin and viola, Op. 10 (c.1773)
3 Duos for violin and viola, Op. 12; Gems Music Publications
6 Duos for violin and viola, Op. 18 (c.1778); Verlag von F.E.C. Leuckart
6 Duos for violin and viola, Op. 19; Gems Music Publications
6 Duos for violin and viola, Op. 23; Gems Music Publications
6 Duos "Le Jeune" for violin and viola; Gems Music Publications
Sinfonia Concertante [No. 11] in A major for violin, viola, cello and orchestra (published 1784)
Sinfonia Concertante [No. 7] in D major for 2 violins, viola and orchestra
Sinfonia Concertante in D major for violin, viola and orchestra (1780–1782)
Sonata in B♭ major for viola and piano, Op. 6

- Johann Stamitz (1717–1757)

Concerto in G major for viola and string orchestra; original for flute and string orchestra
Sonata in G major for viola and piano, Op. 6a; original for violin and basso continuo; transcription by Vadim Borisovsky (published 1956)

- Charles Villiers Stanford (1852–1924)

Sonata for clarinet (or viola) and piano, Op. 129 (1911) (viola version adapted by Harry Waldo Warner)

- Paul Stanhope (b. 1969)

Dawn Lament for viola solo (1999); Australian Music Centre
Shadow Dancing for clarinet, viola and piano (2001); Australian Music Centre

- Yevhen Stankovych (b. 1942)

Concerto for viola and orchestra (1999); Sordino Ediziuns Musicalas
Flowering Garden and Apples Falling into the Water... (Квітучий сад і яблука, що падають у воду …), Trio for clarinet, viola and piano (1996)
Mountain Legend (Гірська легенда) for viola and piano (2003)
Symphony-Concerto (Симфонія-концерт), Concerto No. 2 for viola and orchestra (2004)

- Helen Stanley (b. 1930)

Concerto Romantico for viola and orchestra

- Robert Starer (1924–2001)

Concerto for viola, strings and percussion (1958); Leeds Music
Duo for violin and viola (1954); Southern Music Publishing
Elegy for violin or viola and piano (1985); MMB Music

- Christoph Staude (b. 1965)

Nachbild for viola solo (1986); Edition Pro Nova, Sonoton Music

- Walter Steffens (b. 1934)

Guernica, Elegie for viola and orchestra, Op. 32 (1974–1978); Edition Wilhelm Hansen

- Leon Stein (1910–2002)

Duo Concertante for viola and cello (1978); American Composers Alliance
Sonata for solo viola (1969); Dorn Publications; American Composers Alliance

- Ben Steinberg (b. 1930)

Suite for flute, viola and harp (1981); Canadian Music Centre
Three Songs for flute, viola and harp (1975); Canadian Music Centre

- Eitan Steinberg (b. 1955)

The Fool, Miniature Opera for voice, viola and percussion (2007)
In a Hidden Cleft among Cliffs a Gazelle Drinks Water for voice and viola (or for voice, viola and string orchestra) (1996)
Rava Deravin for viola and string quartet (2001, 2003)
Song of the Bride's Mother for voice and 3 violas (1994)
Variousrespirations for voice, viola and orchestra (1997, 2004)

- Timo Steiner (b. 1976)

Kena on sind kuulata (It's Nice to Listen to You) for viola and piano (2004)

- Roger Steptoe (b. 1953)

3 Paul Verlaine Songs (3 French Songs) for mezzo-soprano, viola and piano (2009); words by Paul Verlaine; Editions BIM
3 Pieces for viola and piano (1982); Stainer & Bell
Sonata for viola and piano (2010); Editions BIM
Sonatine 1 (Une petite sonatine) for solo viola (2009); Editions BIM

- Johann Franz Xaver Sterkel (1750–1817)

6 Duette for violin and viola, Op. 8; Edition Schott

- Max Stern (b. 1947)

Bedouin Impressions (רשמים בדואים) for viola solo (1998); Or-Tav Music Publications

- Bernard Stevens (1916–1983)

Improvisation for solo viola, Op. 48 (1973); Roberton Publications

- Halsey Stevens (1908–1989)

Concerto for viola and orchestra (1976?); American Composers Alliance
Eight Canons for 2 violas (1969); American Composers Alliance
Serenade for viola and piano (1944); Editio Helios
Sonata for viola and piano (1950); American Composers Alliance
Suite for clarinet (or viola) and piano (1945, revised 1953); C.F. Peters
Suite for viola and piano (1957–1959); Peermusic
Three Hungarian Folk Songs for viola and piano (1950); ECS Publishing

- James Stevens (1923–2012)

Four Movements and a Coda for viola and piano (1953); King Watts & Co.; Edition Modern

- Ronald Stevenson (1928–2015)

Recitative and Air on DSCH: In Memoriam Shostakovich for viola and piano (1974, 1987); original version for piano solo; Ronald Stevenson Society; Scottish Music Centre

- Robert Still (1910–1971

Sonata No. 1 for viola and piano
Sonata No. 2 for viola and piano (1953?); Chester Music
Sonata No. 3 for viola and piano
Viola Concerto (unfinished – 1 movement completed and 1 incomplete)

- David Stock (1939–2015)

Concerto for viola and orchestra (1997); MMB Music; Lauren Keiser Music Publishing
Eitz Chayim (Tree of Life) for viola and piano (2004); MMB Music; Lauren Keiser Music Publishing
South Wind for viola solo (2001); MMB Music; Lauren Keiser Music Publishing
A Vanished World for flute, viola and harp (1999); MMB Music; Lauren Keiser Music Publishing

- Karlheinz Stockhausen (1928–2007)

In Freundschaft (In Friendship) for viola solo, Werk 46^{6}/_{7} (1977); Stockhausen-Verlag
Laub und Regen (Leaves and Rain), Final duet from Herbstmusik (Autumn Music) for clarinet and viola, Werk 40 1/2 (1974); Stockhausen-Verlag
Plus-Minus for viola solo, Werk 14 (1963); Universal Edition
Solo for a melody instrument and feedback (live electronics), Werk 19 (1965–1966); Universal Edition
Spiral for a soloist with short-wave receiver, Werk 27 (1968); Universal Edition

- Wolfgang Stockmeier (1931–2015)

3 Stücke (3 Pieces) for flute, viola and organ (1968); Möseler Verlag

- Petar Stojanović (1877–1957)

Sonata in C major for viola and piano, Op. 97

- Zygmunt Stojowski (1870–1946)

Fantazja (Fantasia) for viola and piano, Op. 27 (1905); Polskie Wydawnictwo Muzyczne

- Harvey Stokes

Sonata for viola and piano (2000–2001); Seesaw Music

- Pete Stollery (b. 1960)

Thickness for flute, viola and tape (2000); Scottish Music Centre

- Alan Stout (1932–2018)

Velut umbra, Hymn for flute, viola and chamber ensemble, Op. 35a (1961); American Composers Alliance

- Ulrich Stranz (1946–2004)

Auguri, Music for viola and small orchestra (1981); Bärenreiter-Verlag
Doppelkonzert (Double Concerto) for violin, viola and string orchestra (1988)
Fünf Moments musicaux for 2 violins and viola (1969); Bärenreiter-Verlag
Guter Dinge sein for flute and viola (1998); Bärenreiter-Verlag
Portrait for viola solo (2003); Bärenreiter-Verlag

- Igor Stravinsky (1882–1971)

Élégie (Элегия) for viola solo (1944); Boosey & Hawkes
Pastorale (Пастораль) for viola and piano (1907); transcription for viola and piano by Vadim Borisovsky; Gosudarstvennoe muzykalnoe izdatelstvo (State Music Publishing House)

- Soulima Stravinsky (1910–1994)

Suite for viola solo (1975); C.F. Peters

- John Stringer (b. 1967)

The Shifting Point for viola and piano (2001); University of York Music Press

- Aurel Stroe (1932–2008)

Pe drumul către focurile cereşti (Journey to Celestial Fires; Auf dem Weg zu Höhenfeuern) for viola solo (1979)

- George Templeton Strong (1856–1948)

Berceuse for violin, viola or cello and orchestra (1927)
Sérénade for cello (or viola) and harp (1929)
Sonata in G minor for viola and cello (1916)
Trio "Der Dorfmusikdirektor" for 2 violins and viola (published 1915)

- Gustav Strube (1867–1953)

Berceuse for viola and piano (1908); G. Schirmer
Fantastic Dance for viola and orchestra (1906)
Longing for viola and orchestra (1905)
Regrets for viola and piano (1933); American Viola Society Publications
Sonata in D minor for viola and piano (1925); G. Schirmer
Sonatina for viola and piano (1943); G. Schirmer

- Clive Strutt (b. 1942)

Soliloquy for viola solo (1963); Scottish Music Centre

- Joachim Stutschewsky (1891–1982)

Andante religioso for viola (or cello) and piano (1970); Or-Tav Music Publications
Elegy for viola solo (1982); Or-Tav Music Publications
Kol Nidrei for viola (or cello) and piano (1973); Or-Tav Music Publications
Soliloquia for viola solo (1968); Or-Tav Music Publications

=== Su ===
- Morton Subotnick (b. 1933)

An Arsenal of Defense for viola and "electronic ghost score" (1982); Theodore Presser Company
Sonata for viola and piano (1958); McGinnis & Marx

- Martin Suckling (b. 1981)

Gemini, Concerto for 2 violas (2005, revised 2006); Scottish Music Centre

- Robert Suderburg (1936–2013)

Chamber Music VI, Three Movements for viola and double bass (1980); Theodore Presser Company
Solo Music II: "Ritual Cycle of Lyrics and Dance" for unaccompanied viola (1988–1989); Theodore Presser Company

- Miklós Sugár (b. 1952)

Ballada for 2 violas (1981); Editio Musica Budapest
Marionettjáték (Marionette Game) for viola and CD (2008)
Réminiscences for clarinet, viola and piano (1984)

- Balduin Sulzer (1932–2019)

Aria for viola solo, Op. 42 (1975)
Bagatelle for viola and piano, Op. 238 (2003)
Concerto for viola and chamber orchestra, Op. 24 (1973)
Fantasie for viola and piano 4-hands, Op. 297 (2007)
Fünf Bouffonerien for viola and piano, Op. 78 (1981)
3 Gesänge (3 Songs) on texts of Rose Ausländer for soprano and viola, Op. 196 (1998)
Lied ohne Worte (Song without Words) for viola and piano, Op. 222 (2002)
4 Meditationen on texts of Paul Varga for mezzo-soprano, viola and piano, Op. 276 (2006)
Mutwilligkeiten for viola and percussion trio, Op. 290 (2007)
Pasticcio zum Thema "Regen" for mezzo-soprano, viola and piano, Op. 217 (2001–2002)

- Lepo Sumera (1950–2000)

Boris Björn Baggerile ja tema sõbrale (For Boris Björn Bagger and His Friend) for viola and guitar (1988, 1991); also versions for other instruments
Quasi improvisata I for viola and piano (1983, 1993); original for violin and piano; Edition 49

- Muammer Sun (1932–2021)

Söyleşi (Conversation) for viola solo (1977–1978)

- Franz Surges (1958–2015)

Hoffnungs-Schimmer (Glimmer of Hope) for viola and organ (2003); Edition Dohr
Nebel-Fassaden (Fog-Facades) for flute, viola and snare drum (2004); Edition Dohr

- Viktor Suslin (1942–2012)

Begegnung, Trio for baritone, viola and cello (1988)
Gioco Appassionato for 4 violas (1974)
Grenzübertritt (Crossing Beyond), Trio for viola, cello and double bass (1990); Edition Sikorski
Sonata Capricciosa for viola and harpsichord (1986); Edition Sikorski

- Margaret Sutherland (1897–1984)

6 Bagatelles for violin and viola (1956); Australian Music Centre
Sonata for viola (or clarinet) and piano (1949); Australian Music Centre

- Louis Svečenski (1862–1926)

25 Technical Exercises for viola (1917); G. Schirmer

- Atli Heimir Sveinsson (1938–2019)

Cathexis for viola and piano (1977–1978); Íslensk tónverkamiðstöð
Dúó Rapp for viola and double bass (2004); Íslensk tónverkamiðstöð
Könnun (Exploration) for viola and orchestra (1971); Íslensk tónverkamiðstöð
Minning II (Manuela in Memoriam) for bass flute, viola and harp (2006); Íslensk tónverkamiðstöð
Þrjú sönglög (3 Songs) for low voice, viola and piano (2000); Íslensk tónverkamiðstöð
Sonata for viola solo (2002); Íslensk tónverkamiðstöð
Sonata for viola and piano (2011); Íslensk tónverkamiðstöð
Springsongs I-IV and Minning (Manuela in Memoriam) for flute, viola and harp (2006); Íslensk tónverkamiðstöð

- Evgeny Svetlanov (1928–2002)

Aria (Ария) for viola and piano

- Tomáš Svoboda (1939–2022)

Forest Rhythms for flute, viola and xylophone, Op. 150 (1995); Thomas C. Stangland Co.
Sonata for viola and piano, Op. 36 (1961); Thomas C. Stangland Co.

- Freda Swain (1902–1985)

English Reel for viola and piano (1958); J. Williams
Song at Evening for viola and piano (1958); J. Williams

- Józef Świder (1930–2014)

Wokaliza (Vocalise) for soprano and viola (1953)

- Jay Sydeman (1928–2021)

Auld Lang Sydeman for violin and viola (ca. 1993)
Concerto da Camera for viola and chamber ensemble (1968); Okra Music Corporation; Seesaw Music Corporation
Duo for 2 violas (ca. 1985)
Duo for flute and viola (ca. 1982)
Duo for viola and harpsichord (or piano) (1967); Okra Music Corporation; Seesaw Music Corporation
Duo for violin and viola (ca. 1970)
Duo No. 1 for viola and cello (ca. 1984)
Duo No. 2 for viola and cello (ca. 1986)
2 Duos for violin and viola (1991)
Momo Duo for violin and viola (1991)
Music for viola, winds and percussion (1971); Okra Music Corporation; Seesaw Music Corporation
2 Pieces for viola and piano (ca. 1992)
The Place of Blue Flowers for narrator and viola
Pops Wedding Music for violin and viola (ca. 1994–1995)
A Prayer for alto, viola and piano (ca. 1983)
Prelude for viola and cello (1983)
Sonata No. 1 for viola and piano (ca. 1990)
Sonata No. 2 for viola and piano (ca. 1992)
Sonata No. 3 for viola and piano (ca. 1994)
Trio for 2 violins and viola (ca. 1986)
Trio for 3 violas (ca. 1985)
Trio for viola, cello and piano (1985)
Variations for viola and bassoon (1955); American Music Center Library

- Ferenc Szabó (1902–1969)

Air for viola and piano (1953); original for violin and piano; Zeneműkiadó
Szerenád (Serenade) for flute and viola (1974); Editio Musica Budapest

- Iris Szeghy (b. 1956)

Ciaccona (Chaconne) for viola solo (1991); Tonger Verlag

- Gusztáv Szerémi (1877–1952)

Concerto No. 1 in F major for viola (viola alto) and orchestra, Op. 6 (published 1890s)
Concerto No. 2 in B♭ major for viola (viola alto) and orchestra, Op. 57 (1911)
Rêverie for viola (viola alto) and piano, Op. 2
Trois morceaux lyriques (3 Lyric Pieces) for viola (viola alto) and piano, Op. 33

- Erzsébet Szőnyi (1924–2019)

Berceuse for viola and piano; Collection Panorama: Œuvres Contemporaines, Volume 1 (1987); Éditions Gérard Billaudot
Duo for violin and viola (1958); Editio Musica Budapest
Francia szvit (French Suite) for viola and piano (1984); Editio Musica Budapest
