= Motoyuki =

- Gender: Male

Origin
- Origin: Japanese
- Meaning: Different meanings depending on the kanji used

Motoyuki (written: 源幸, 素幸, 素之 or 元之) is a masculine Japanese given name. Notable people with the name include:

- Motoyuki Akahori (赤堀 元之) (born 1970), Japanese baseball player
- Motoyuki Odachi (尾立 源幸) (born 1963), Japanese politician
- Motoyuki Shitanda (四反田 素幸) (born 1952), Japanese composer
- Motoyuki Takabatake (高畠 素之) (born 1886), Japanese journalist and activist
