= Ruth Taiko Watanabe =

Japanese-American music librarian

- Born: May 12, 1916; Los Angeles
- Died: February 26, 2005 (aged 88); Pittsford (village)
- Education: University of Southern California, University of Rochester
- Occupation: Music librarian, librarian
- Employer: Sibley Music Library

Ruth Taiko Watanabe (May 12, 1916 – February 26, 2005) was a Japanese-American music librarian. For 38 years (1946–1984), she ran the Sibley Music Library at the Eastman School of Music at the University of Rochester.

She was called "one of the great music librarians of the twentieth century."

== Early life and education ==
Ruth Taiko Watanabe was born on May 12, 1916, in Los Angeles. A nisei, she was the daughter of Japanese immigrants Kohei Watanabe, an importer of Asian art materials, and Iwa Watanabe, a musician and singer who graduated from the Tokyo National Institute for the Arts. She had a relatively privileged upbringing and began piano lessons while only 6 or 7. Her mother suffered from a tubercular infection so the family frequently moved in search of more favorable housing and climate, meaning constant school changes for their daughter.

Watanabe attended Theodore Roosevelt High School, followed by the University of Southern California, where she majored in piano. By her sophomore year she was teaching piano students and was aiming for a teaching career. She also served two years as president of the student body of the School of Music. When she graduated with her B.Mus. in 1937, she received an award for the highest undergraduate academic record.

She quickly completed a succession of other academic degrees. She earned an A.B. in English in 1939, an M.A. in English in 1941, and an M. Mus. in musicology in 1942. She focused on music in Elizabethan dramaturgy and her M.A. thesis was "Music at the Court of Henry VIII," which won the Mu Phi Epsilon 1946 Musicological Research Competition.

== Internment ==
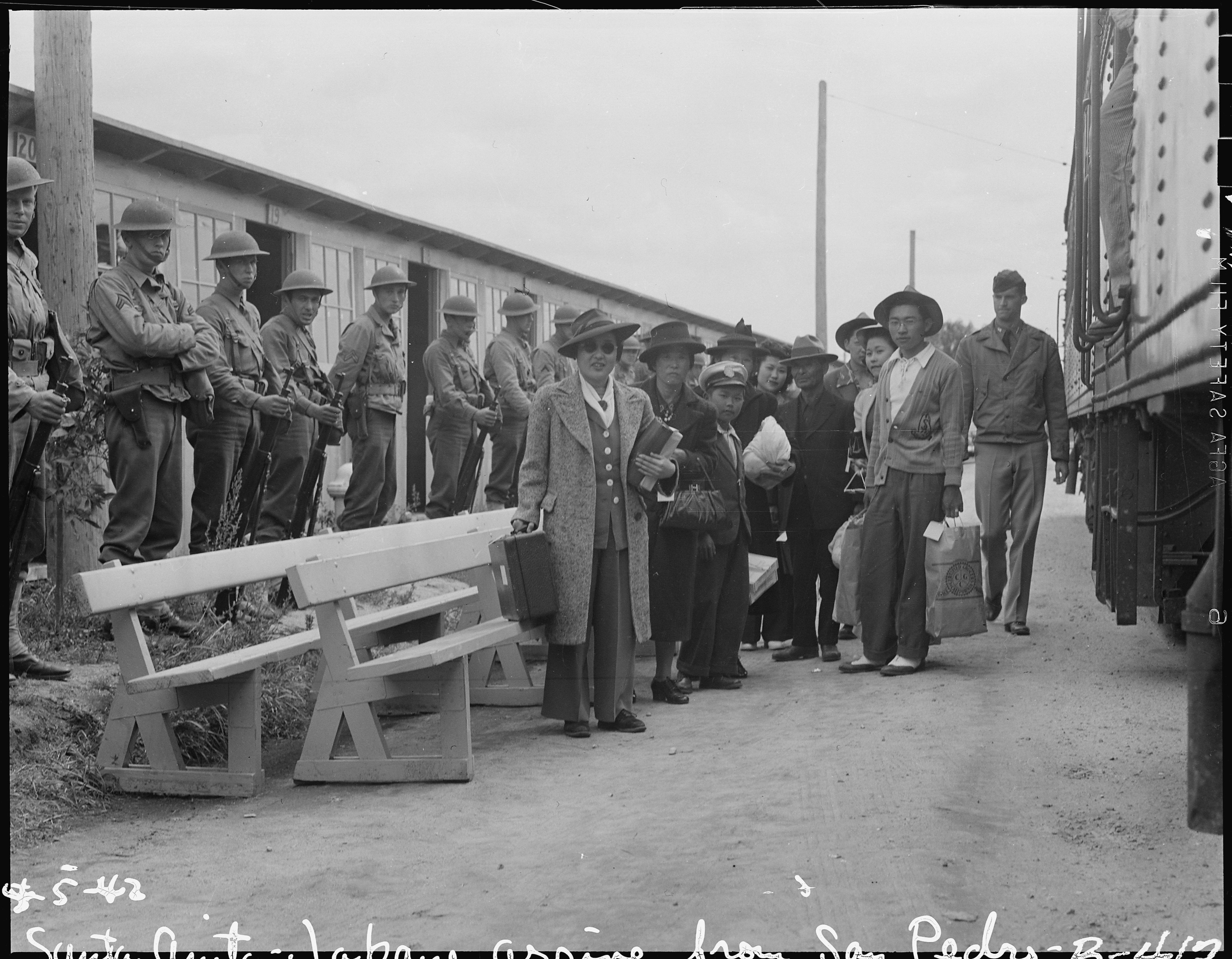
Japanese-American detainees arrive at the Santa Anita Assembly Center

Her plan to earn a Ph.D. in English was interrupted by the internment of Japanese Americans during World War II. The family's assets were frozen and her father was forced to abandon his business. In April 1942, following the signing of Executive Order 9066, they were involuntarily relocated to the Santa Anita Assembly Center, living in barracks constructed on the parking lot of a racetrack behind barbed wire. One of her USC professors, Pauline Alderman, offered her advice she credited with helping her through her internment experience: "As long as you're alive, there's nothing you can't live without." Internees at all the camps and centers engaged in a wide variety of educational and recreational pursuits, and at Santa Anita that included a newspaper, a library, and regular concerts using the racetrack's grandstand and audio equipment. Watanabe herself taught numerous music classes. She wrote to a former teacher, Edythe Backus, from the camp in May:

[...] I have a teaching assignment in the new so-called music school here. It's a full-time job--44 hours each week--and I'm to have charge of all the theory classes, and music appreciation series, and teach an advanced piano class. The theory classes are coming along much better than I thought, but the piano department is struggling along with only four pianos and over fifty pupils. [...] The whole place seems intellectually very sterile--and it bothers me a lot. I've been trying to read and study, and, when the piano is unoccupied, to practice.

In June she added:

We got no less than ten new pupils today, and there's a long waiting list. I start teaching at 7:30 in the morning and finish at 4:30, with only a half hour for lunch. Two evenings a week I have lessons and classes until 7:30 at night. Of course, all the elementary and intermediate students are taught in classes. One teacher has over a hundred thirty students in some nine or ten classes and is teaching them to be good musicians at that. I think it's remarkable.

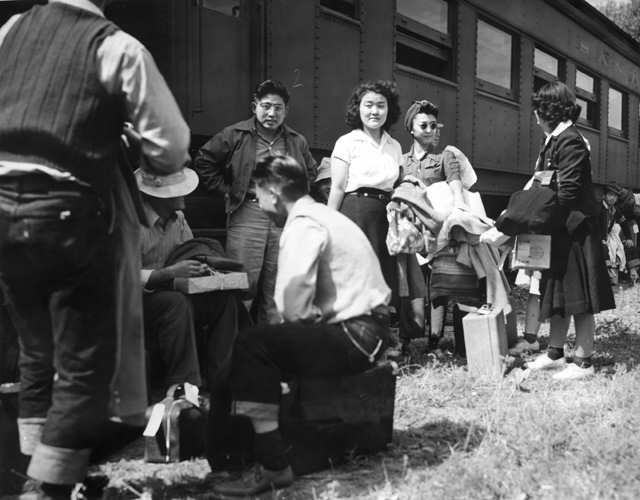
Japanese-American internees arriving at the Granada War Relocation Center

On Sunday's following religious services, Watanabe offered a "Music Hour", where she played records of Western classical music like Rachmaninoff and on the grandstand's sound system and lectured about the work for an audience as many as five thousand of detainees. She developed a network of former teachers and colleagues to lend records for her use at these lectures. She wrote to Backus:

My program notes include a short biographical sketch of each composer, a brief resume of his chief contributions and characteristics, and specific details concerning the works to be heard. Some of the people take notes.... The general response to the music hour has been even better than I had anticipated. The size of the audience has been increasing from week to week, and what's more, a number of people have put in requests for their favorite symphonies and have even come to the office to ask me about certain musical forms, composers, etc.... Anyway, it's inspiring and gratifying work.

The community constructed at Santa Anita that summer came to an end when the US government began shipping detainees to concentration camps in the interior of the US. Watanabe and her family were transferred to the Granada War Relocation Center - known as "Camp Amache" - in Colorado in September 1942. Watanabe began teaching again. The American Friends Service Committee was engaged in efforts to place college students in schools so they could escape the camps, but had yet to find a place for Watanabe. In late September, she received a telegram Howard Hanson, director of the Eastman School of Music at the University of Rochester, offering her a fellowship. She left for Rochester, having been at Camp Amache only a few weeks. On October 2, 1942, she arrived in Rochester, New York, where she would spend the rest of her career.

== Eastman School of Music ==
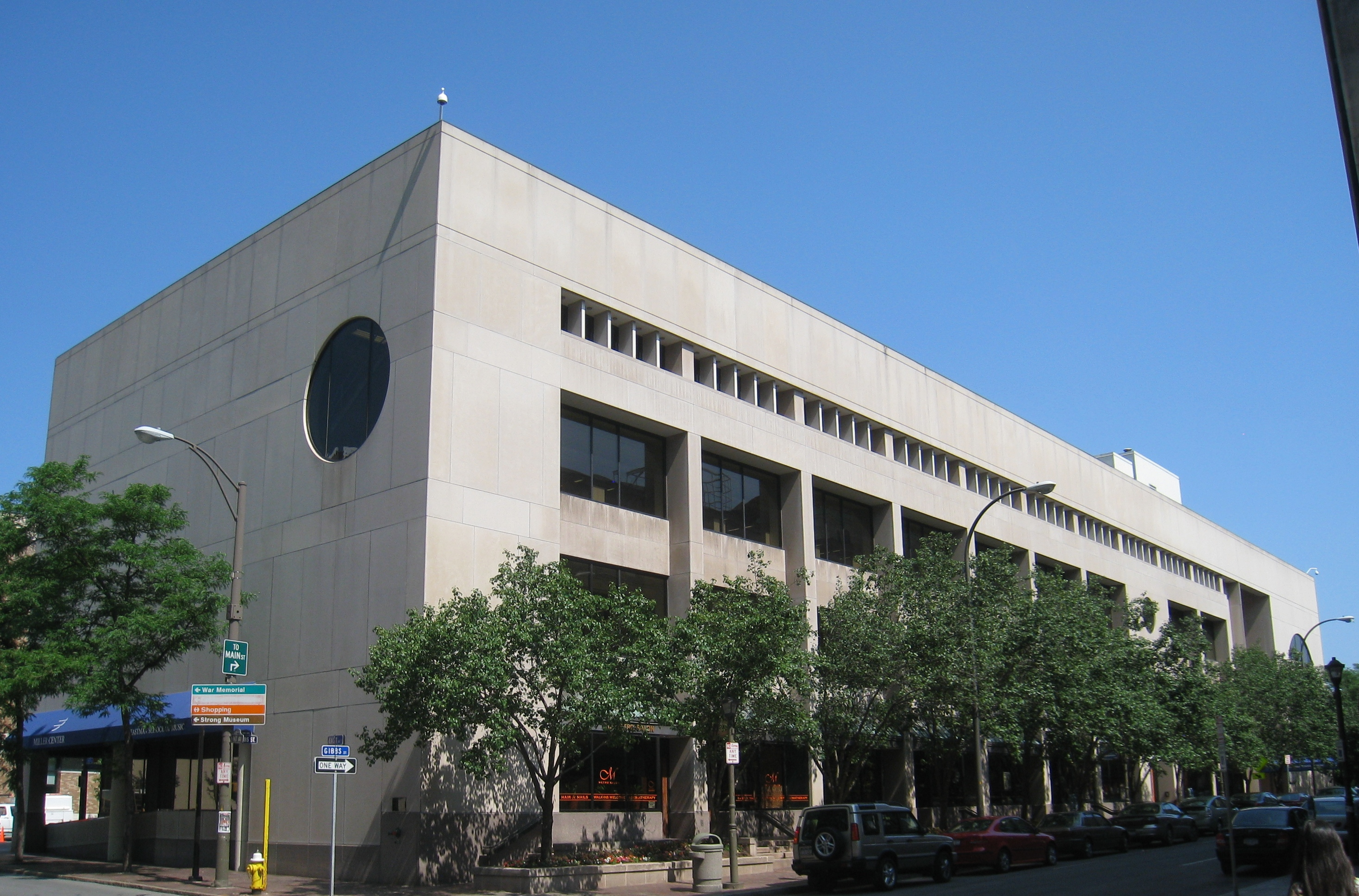
The Sibley Music Library at the Eastman School of Music

At Eastman, Watanabe began preparing for her Ph.D. in musicology with advisor Charles Warren Fox. A month later, Watanabe's father died. She returned to Granada to arrange her father's funeral, but she was unable receive permission to leave the camp to retrieve her father's ashes until the camp's educational director arranged an educational "mission" by having her address a seminar at the University of Denver. Her family's assets were still frozen, and due to the expenses of this trip, Watanabe was broke.

She was hired by librarian Barbara Duncan for her first job in a library as a "fetch-it" girl retrieving materials in the Sibley Music Library for 35 cents an hour. She later said "I never knew that a library could be so much fun," having disliked previous quiet and staid libraries she was familiar with. By 1944 she had a full-time job as head of circulation, whose responsibilities included "answering 'real' reference questions, keeping an eye on rare books, tabulating statistics...and supervising the annual inventory." In 1946, she joined the faculty at Eastman, teaching music history.

When her mother was released from Camp Amache, she lived with Watanabe in Rochester, who became her sole means of support. In need of money, she decided to abandon library work for teaching. Instead, Hanson appointed her acting librarian to replace Duncan, and permanent librarian the following year. Hanson had frequently clashed with Duncan and preferred a librarian with Watanabe's background in music performance. During Watanabe's early years of leadership of the Sibley Library, she faced some awkwardness, as Duncan remained on staff for five years until her retirement and refused to speak to Watanabe. She also struggled to find time to finish her PhD dissertation, "Five Italian Madrigal Books of the Late 16th Century: A Transcription and Study of the First Books a cinque by Antonio il Verso, Bartolomeo Roy, Bernardino Scaramella, Pietro Paolo Quartieri, and Emilio Virgelli," but persisted with the help of a fellowship from the American Association of University Women (AAUW) and the assistance of Dr. Alfred Einstein, who proofread 400 pages of her transcriptions of Italian madrigals for no charge. She graduated with her PhD in 1952, shortly before her mother's death in January 1953.

During her 38 years as head of the Sibley Library, she built the collection from 55 thousand to over 250 thousand items, including many rare late 18th and 19th century materials purchased in book buying trips to Europe. She was active in the education of music librarians, teaching at the library school at SUNY Geneseo until the program closed, then teaching her own summer institutes in music librarianship. She also authored a textbook, Introduction to Music Research (1967). She served as president of the Music Library Association from 1979 to 1981.

She retired as head of the Sibley Library in 1984, but remained as the school's archivist for many years and assisted her successor in the transfer of the library to a new building.

== Death and legacy ==
Ruth Taiko Watanabe died on 26 February 2005 in Pittsford. The Ruth T. Watanabe Special Collections at the Sibley Music Library is named for her.
