= Virginia Cunningham =

American music librarian (1910–1996)

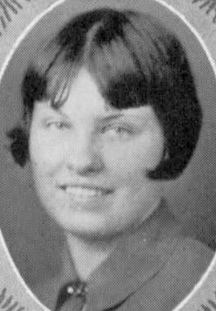
- Virginia Meeks, from the 1928 Wichita East High School yearbook
- Born: Virginia Adelaide Meeks; August 23, 1910; Bridgeport, Illinois
- Died: May 13, 1996; Chapel Hill, North Carolina
- Occupation: Music librarian

Virginia Adelaide Meeks Cunningham (August 23, 1910 – May 13, 1996) was an American music librarian.

== Early life and education ==
Virginia Adelaide Meeks was born in Bridgeport, Illinois, the daughter of William C. Meeks and Lora Bunn Madding Meeks. Her father was employed in the oil industry. Her sister Jane married Wichita lawyer James Ashford Manka.

Meeks graduated from Wichita East High School in 1928. She studied English, first at Missouri's Stephens College and later at the University of Wisconsin-Madison, from which she received a BA in 1932; she also received a certificate in library science from the same institution. After she married, she pursued graduate work in musicology at Columbia University, from 1936 until 1940.

== Career ==
From 1932 until 1933 Cunningham was on the staff of the Wichita Public Library, and from 1933 until 1934 she worked at the New York Public Library. From 1934 until 1940 she worked at the Columbia University Music Library. She joined the staff of the Library of Congress in 1942, taking a position in the cataloging department. In 1946 she began to catalog music in the US Copyright Office — the first person to do so — and a decade later she was appointed to lead the music section of the Library's descriptive cataloging division. This position she held until retiring in 1972.

Cunningham served as president of the Music Library Association from 1956 until 1958, and was active throughout her career in that organization and in the International Association of Music Libraries, Archive and Documentation Centres. For the latter she assisted in developing international cataloging codes for music, and helped to establish the rule of using uniform titles. She also assisted in a project to create a catalog that lists all music that had ever been published in the United States. She edited volume three of the Code international de la catalogage de la musique, Rules for Full Cataloguing, published in Frankfurt in 1971. That same year she received a citation for distinguished service and an honorary membership from the Music Library Association for her numerous contributions to the field.

Cunningham wrote a biography, Paul Laurence Dunbar and His Song (1947). She wrote articles for the Music Library Association journal, Notes, before and after her term as president of the Association.

== Personal life ==
Virginia Meeks married a fellow University of Wisconsin alumnus, physical educator Charles Howard Cunningham, in New York in 1934. She died in Chapel Hill, North Carolina.
