= David H. Porter =

American classical philologist

5th President of Skidmore College
- In office 1987–1999
- Preceded by: Joseph C. Palamountain Jr.
- Succeeded by: Jamienne S. Studley

Personal details
- Born: David Hugh Porter; October 29, 1935 New York City, New York, U.S.
- Died: March 25, 2016 (aged 80) Saratoga Springs, New York, U.S.
- Spouse(s): Laudie Dimmette (m. 1958; died 1986) Helen Nelson (m. 1987)
- Children: 4
- Education: Swarthmore College (B.A., 1958); Philadelphia Conservatory of Music; Princeton University (Ph.D., 1962)

David Hugh Porter (29 October 1935 – 25 March 2016) was an American academic and the fifth president of Skidmore College in Saratoga Springs, New York, serving from 1987 to 1999. Porter was a professor and lecturer of classics and music, starting his career at Carleton College in Northfield, Minnesota, where he taught from 1962 to 1987.

== Biography ==
Porter was born in New York City on October 29, 1935. He received a Bachelor of Arts degree from Swarthmore College in 1958, and a Ph.D. in Classics from Princeton University in 1962. After graduation he taught Classics, Music, and Liberal Arts at Carleton College in Northfield, Minnesota, served as Visiting Professor of Classics at Princeton, and returned to Carleton as President. In 1987 he became the fifth president of Skidmore and also taught Classics and Liberal Studies. After stepping down as president in 1999 he taught at Williams College and Indiana University before returning to Skidmore as Tisch Family Distinguished Professor. He retired in December, 2013. In 2011 he was awarded an honorary degree of Doctor of Humane Letters by Carleton College.

Porter was an accomplished musician. He studied piano with Edward Steuermann from 1955 to 1962 and harpsichord with Gustav Leonhardt in Amsterdam, and has performed recitals throughout the US and the UK. Porter also studied at the Philadelphia Conservatory of Music.

Porter was married twice. He married his first wife, Laudie Dimmette, in 1958. Dimmette was an accomplished flautist and professor of flute at Carleton College. Porter and Dimmette had four children. She died in 1986. The Laudie D. Porter Memorial Fund was established at Carleton College in 1986 by the Porter family. He married the former Helen Nelson in 1987.

Porter died on March 25, 2016. He was found dead the following day in a field near his home where he walked frequently. He was 80 years old.

== Publications ==
=== Books ===
- Seeking Life Whole: Willa Cather and the Brewsters (with Lucy Marks). Farleigh Dickinson University Press (Willa Cather Series), 2009.
- On the Divide: The Many Lives of Willa Cather. University of Nebraska Press, 2008.
- The Omega Workshops and the Hogarth Press: An Artful Fugue (with Cecil Woolf). Cecil Woolf, London, 2008. ISBN 9781897967584
- Virginia Woolf and the Hogarth Press: ‘Riding a Great Horse'. London, 2004.
- Virginia Woolf and Logan Pearsall Smith. An Exquisitely Flattering Dance. London, 2002. ISBN 9781897967331
- The Not Quite Innocent Bystander. Writings of Edward Steuermann. Co edited with Gunther Schuller and Clara Steuermann. University of Nebraska Press, 1989. ISBN 0803241917
- Horace's Poetic Journey. A Reading of Odes 1–3. Princeton University Press, 1987. ISBN 9780691067025
- Only Connect. Three Studies in Greek Tragedy. University Press of America, 1987. ISBN 9780819159502
- Carleton Remembered, 1909–1986, with M.E. Jarchow. Viking Press, Minneapolis, 1987.
