= Allen Sapp (composer) =

- Born: Allen D. Sapp Jr. December 10, 1922; Philadelphia, Pennsylvania
- Died: January 4, 1999 (aged 76); Cincinnati, Ohio
- Occupation: Music composer

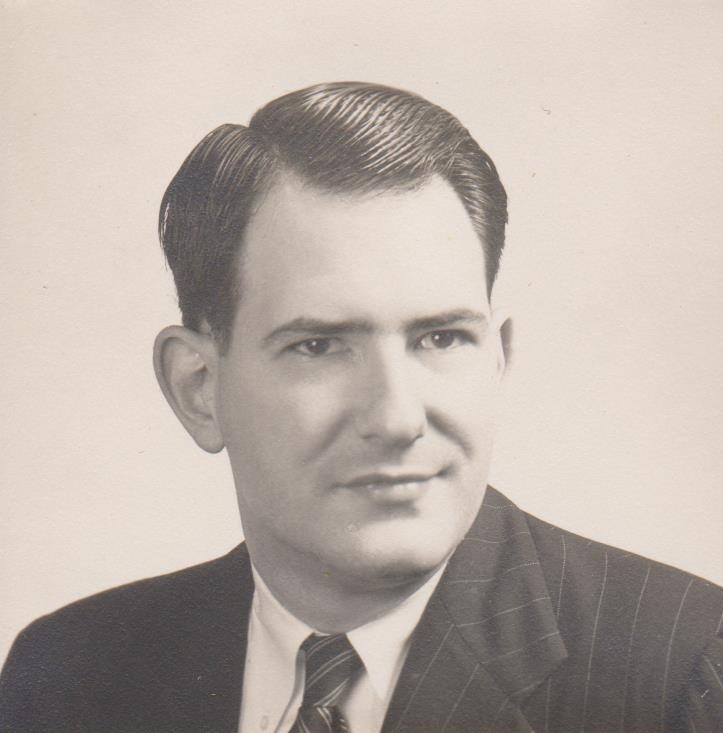
Allen Sapp, ca. 1950

Allen Sapp (1922, Philadelphia – 1999, Cincinnati) was a composer of music for piano, voice, chamber, and orchestral music.

== Education and family ==
A native of Philadelphia, Pennsylvania, Sapp was a United States Army veteran who had served as a cryptanalyst in England, France, Belgium, and Germany during World War II. During the 1940s, Sapp earned bachelor's and master's degrees from Harvard University, having studied primarily with Walter Piston and Irving Fine, and privately with Nadia Boulanger and Aaron Copland.

Allen married Norma Bertolami, a concert pianist and sister of the concert violinist Viviane Bertolami Kirkwood.

== Career ==
Sapp joined the Harvard music faculty in 1950.

After a brief appointment at Wellesley College (1958–61), he was appointed Chair of the music department at the University of Buffalo (later, State University of New York (SUNY) at Buffalo). While at Buffalo, Sapp presided over many significant projects promoting contemporary music and art, including the Center of the Creative and Performing Arts (with Lukas Foss), and helped build a significant music faculty including the Budapest String Quartet, musicologists Jeremy Noble and James McKinnon, and music librarians James B. Coover and Carol June Bradley.

He also served as director of major national arts initiatives, including the American Council for the Arts in Education (1972–74), and Project Arts/Worth (1971–74).

Sapp served as Provost of Florida State University (1975–78), and as Dean of the University of Cincinnati College Conservatory of Music (CCM) from 1978 to 1980.

From 1980 through the mid-1990s Sapp remained on the faculty of CCM as "Professor of Music," teaching a wide range of courses from music analysis to the history of music theory, and various seminars on special topics. He also taught composition and musicianship in private sessions.

The first president of the board of directors of the Cincinnati Chamber Orchestra, Sapp retired from his position as professor of composition at the University of Cincinnati in 1993.

== Death ==
Sapp died from heart failure at his home in Cincinnati, Ohio on Monday, January 4, 1999 at the age of 76.

== Bibliography ==
- Curtin, David. The Piano Music of Allen Dwight Sapp. D.M.A. diss, Univ. of Cincinnati, 1999.
- Green, Alan. Allen Sapp: A Bio-Bibliography (Westport, CT: Greenwood Press, 1996).
- Green, Alan, ed. Allen Sapp: Piano Sonatas I-IV (Middleton, WI: A-R Editions, 2021).
- Green, Alan, ed. Allen Sapp: Violin Sonatas I-IV and Viola Sonata (Middleton, WI: A-R Editions, 2024).
- Hogan, Charles. "The Piano Sonatas of Allen Sapp: A Study of Style and Language." D.M.A. diss, Univ. of Cincinnati, 2010.
- Pollack, Howard. "Favored Sons: Robert Middleton and Allen Sapp." In Harvard Composers: Walter Piston and His Students from Elliott Carter to Frederic Rzewski (Metuchen, NJ: Scarecrow Press, 1992), 208–30.

== Discography ==
- Bloom, Sara Lambert. Premiere Chamber Works (Centaur, 1995).
- Gelland, Martin, and Lennart Wallin. Lyrische Aspekte Unseres Jahrhunderts (Vienna Modern Masters, 1995).
- Lockhart, Keith (Cincinnati Chamber Orchestra). Allen Sapp (CRI, 1997).
- Vassiliadis, Lambis. Allen Sapp: Piano Sonatas [nos. 2-4] (Koch Discover International, 1996).
