= Mary Wallace Davidson =

American music librarian (1935–2012)

- Born: June 9, 1935; Louisville
- Died: October 11, 2012; Boston
- Occupation: Music librarian

Mary Wallace Davidson (June 9, 1935 – October 11, 2012) was an American music librarian. She is known for her work with the architects on the design of the Sibley Music Library at the Eastman School of Music at the University of Rochester.

Davidson was born in Louisville, Kentucky. She attended Wellesley College, Simmons College, and Harvard University. She worked at several libraries and universities including the Brookline Public Library, Radcliffe College, Wellesley College, the Eastman School of Music, and the Cook Music Library at Indiana University.

Davidson served for terms as president of the International Association of Music Libraries, and the Music Library Association (MLA). In 1998 she was the recipient of the MLA Citation in Recognition of Distinguished Service to Music Librarianship.
