= Dickinson classification =

Musical composition classification system

The Dickinson classification is a library classification scheme used to catalogue and classify musical compositions. It was developed by George Sherman Dickinson (1886–1964), and published in 1938. It is used by many music libraries, primarily those at Vassar and Columbia Universities.

It is also recorded, albeit incompletely, by Carol June Bradley in The Dickinson Classification for Music, published in 1972.

== Class 000 – Miscellaneous ==
=== 000 Several or special classes ===
- 010 Manuscripts
- 020 Incunabula, rare editions
- 030 Facsimiles
- 040 Monuments (Denkmäler)
- 050 Collected works of one composer
  - 055 Thematic catalogues
- 060 Partial collections, several classes, of one composer
- 070 Methods, tutors, etc., with some text
- 080 Other miscellaneous
- 090 Historical collections compiled to illustrate the history of music or some phase of it

== Classes 100–600 – Instrumental ==
=== 100 Keyboard ===
- 110 Clavier, i.e. piano, harpsichord, clavichord, and virginal
- 120 Clavier duos, trios, etc.
- 150 Organ

=== 200 Bowed strings ===
- 210 Violin and piano
- 220 Viola and piano
- 230 Violoncello and piano
- 240 Double bass and piano

=== 300 Winds ===
- 310 Flute or recorder and piano
- 320 Oboe or English horn and piano
- 330 Clarinet and piano
- 340 Bassoon and piano
- 350 Horn and piano
- 360 Trumpet and piano
- 370 Trombone and piano

=== 400 Plucked strings, percussion, mechanical and miscellaneous instruments ===
==== Plucked strings ====
- 410 Harp
- 421 Guitar
- 431 Mandolin
- 450 Lute

==== Percussion ====
- 460 Percussion

==== Mechanical and miscellaneous instruments ====
- 470 Solely electronic music, musique concrète
- 480 Electronic music in combination with conventional instruments

=== 500 Chamber ensembles ===
- 520 Bowed string ensembles
- 530 Wind ensembles (Note: Such as woodwind quartets or wind quintets; not to be confused with 630 Band or wind orchestra, which may also be referred to as wind ensembles.)
- 540 Plucked string with percussion
- 550 Bowed string and wind ensembles

=== 600 Orchestral ensembles ===
- 610 Full orchestra
- 620 String orchestra
- 630 Band or wind orchestra
- 650 Chamber orchestra
- 680 Concerti
  - 685 Double, triple, etc., concerti
  - 689 Concerti grossi

== Classes 700–900 – Vocal (with or without instruments) ==
=== 700 Vocal solo and solo ensembles ===
- 710 Voice solo and 1 instrument, secular
- 750 Voice solo and 1 instrument, sacred
- 780 Folk music

=== 800 Choral ensembles ===
- 810 Secular choral works
- 850 Sacred choral works
- 880 Liturgic choral works

=== 900 Dramatic ensembles ===
- 910 Operas
- 950 Ballets
- 980 Incidental music
