= Eva Judd O'Meara =

American music librarian

Eva Judd O'Meara

Eva Judd O'Meara (1884–1979) was an American music librarian and bibliographer. O’Meara headed the Music Library at Yale University from its inception in 1917 until her retirement in 1952. O'Meara was one of the founding members of the Music Library Association (MLA) and was the founding editor of Notes.

O'Meara learned her craft through work experience, "first in public libraries in Connecticut (1905–8), then at McGill University Library (1908–11), and as a cataloger for a private library (1911–13)."

The Eva Judd O'Meara Award, first given in 1979, was established by the MLA to recognize the best review in Notes.

A few weeks before her death in 1979, she spoke to a conference of music librarians at a meeting of the New England Music Library Association. At this meeting she recalled a story of how she acquired the Music Library's most prized possession, the Clavier-Büchlein vor Wilhelm Friedemann Bach (1720), a book-length manuscript that Johann Sebastian Bach wrote for the education of his ten-year-old son.
