= Carol June Bradley =

American music librarian

- Carol June Bradley, from a 1959 newspaper
- Born: August 12, 1934; Huntingdon, Pennsylvania
- Died: July 27, 2009; Buffalo, New York
- Occupation: Music librarian

Carol June Bradley (August 12, 1934 – July 27, 2009) was an American music librarian.

== Early life and education ==
Bradley was born in Huntingdon, Pennsylvania, the daughter of George Albert Bradley and Alice Bolinger Bradley. Her father was a math teacher and her mother was a teacher and school principal.

Bradley graduated from Carlisle High School in 1952. She majored in music education at Lebanon Valley College, where she earned an undergraduate degree in 1956. She trained as a librarian at Western Reserve University, where she wrote her 1957 master's thesis on the history of Edwin A. Fleisher Music Collection at the Free Library of Philadelphia. Later in her career, she completed doctoral studies in library science at Florida State University, with a 1978 dissertation titled The Genesis of American Music Librarianship: 1902-1942.

She studied violin, working with Mischa Mishakoff, and played with the Cleveland Philharmonic and the Philadelphia Orchestra during college.

== Career ==
Bradley worked at the Drinker Library of Choral Music in Philadelphia as a young woman. In 1959 she moved to the United States Military Academy Library in West Point, where she was the academy's first music librarian. In 1960, she began working at Vassar College's music library. She was associate director of the Music Library at the University at Buffalo from 1967 until her retirement in 1999. She and James B. Coover built the school's music library, and co-directed its music librarianship master's degree program. In 1977, she was recognized with the Chancellor's Award for Librarianship.

Bradley was chair of the Music Library Association (MLA)'s Information and Organization Committee from 1959 to 1957, and chair of the Automation Committee from 1969 to 1971. She represented the MLA at the Library Automation, Research, and Consulting Association, and with the Association for Computing Machinery, both roles served from 1969 to 1971. She received the MLA Citation, the association's highest award, in 2001. She wrote several articles, mostly historical and biographical, for the MLA's professional journal, Notes, and for Fontes Artes Musicae, the journal of the International Association of Music Libraries. In 2003, the MLA established the annual Carol June Bradley Award for Historical Research in Music Librarianship.

Bradley wrote and edited professional texts including Manual of Music Librarianship (1966), The Dickinson Classification: A Cataloguing & Classification Manual for Music (1968), Reader in Music Librarianship (1973), and Music Collections in American Libraries: A Chronology (1981). She also contributed articles to the Dictionary of American Library Biography (1978), and compiled Index to Poetry in Music: A Guide to the Poetry Set as Solo Songs by 125 Major Composers (2003). Her 1978 dissertation became the basis of two other books by Bradley, American Music Librarianship: A Biographical and Historical Survey (1990) and American Music Librarianship: A Research and Information Guide (2005).

== Personal life ==
Bradley died in 2009, aged 74 years, at a hospital in Buffalo, New York.
