= Eduard Steuermann =

Austrian-born American pianist (1892–1964)

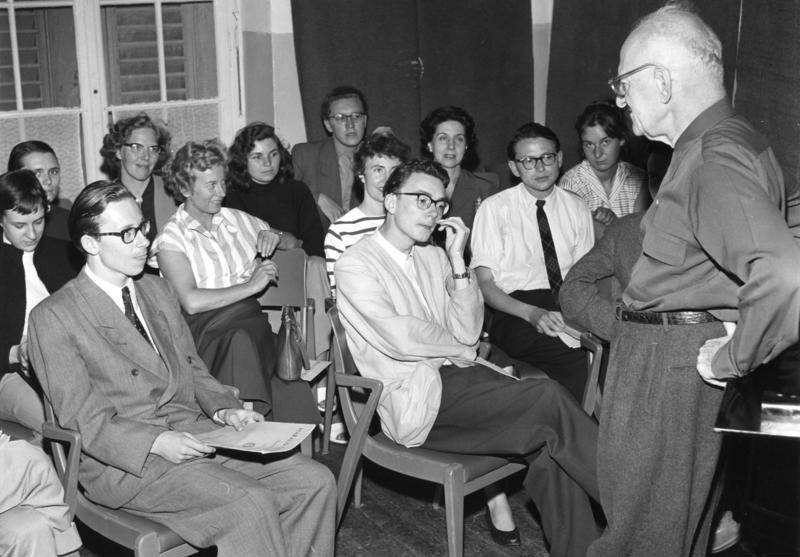
Eduard Steuermann at the 12th Internationale Ferienkurse für neue Musik, Darmstadt 1957

Eduard Steuermann (June 18, 1892, in Sambor, Austria-Hungary – November 11, 1964, in New York City) was an Austrian-born American pianist and composer.

Steuermann studied piano with Vilém Kurz at the Lemberg Conservatory and Ferruccio Busoni in Berlin, and studied composition with Engelbert Humperdinck and Arnold Schoenberg. He played the piano part in the first performance of Schoenberg's Pierrot Lunaire and premiered his Piano Concerto. He continued his association with Schoenberg as a pianist for the composer's Society for Private Musical Performances in Vienna, and made an arrangement for piano trio of Schoenberg's Verklärte Nacht. He performed in the radio premiere of Schoenberg's "Ode to Napoleon Bonaparte" with the New York Philharmonic under Artur Rodziński on November 26, 1944. In 1952, he was awarded the Schoenberg Medal by the International Society for Contemporary Music. He taught at the Internationale Ferienkurse für Neue Musik at Darmstadt.

Steuermann, whose parents were non-practising Jews, emigrated to the United States in 1938 to escape the antisemitic policies of Nazi Germany. He was famed for his Beethoven recitals of the 1950s and was a distinguished teacher, teaching at the Juilliard School from 1952 to 1964 and the Philadelphia Conservatory of Music from 1948 to 1963.

In the US, he was known as Edward Steuermann. Among the prominent performers who studied with Steuermann were Alfred Brendel, Jakob Gimpel, Jerome Lowenthal, Moura Lympany, Menahem Pressler, Stephen Pruslin, Russell Sherman, Jacob Maxin, and Beatrice Witkin. He also taught philosopher Theodor W. Adorno, composers Gunther Schuller and Paavo Heininen, and theorists Edward T. Cone and David Lewin.

In 1964, he died of leukemia in New York City. In 1989, the University of Nebraska Press published a collection of Steuermann's writings entitled, The Not Quite Innocent Bystander: Writings of Edward Steuermann (ISBN 0803241917). The book was co-edited by Eduard's wife Clara Steuermann, David H. Porter and Gunther Schuller.

A major work by Steuermann, Variations for Orchestra, is published by Philharmusica Co., New York.

The actress and screenwriter Salka Viertel was his sister. The conductor Michael Gielen was his nephew. The footballer Zygmunt Steuermann was his younger brother. Steuermann married Clara Silvers, a pianist and music librarian, in 1949.
