= Sibley Music Library =

Coordinates: 43°9′26.78″N 77°36′6.21″W

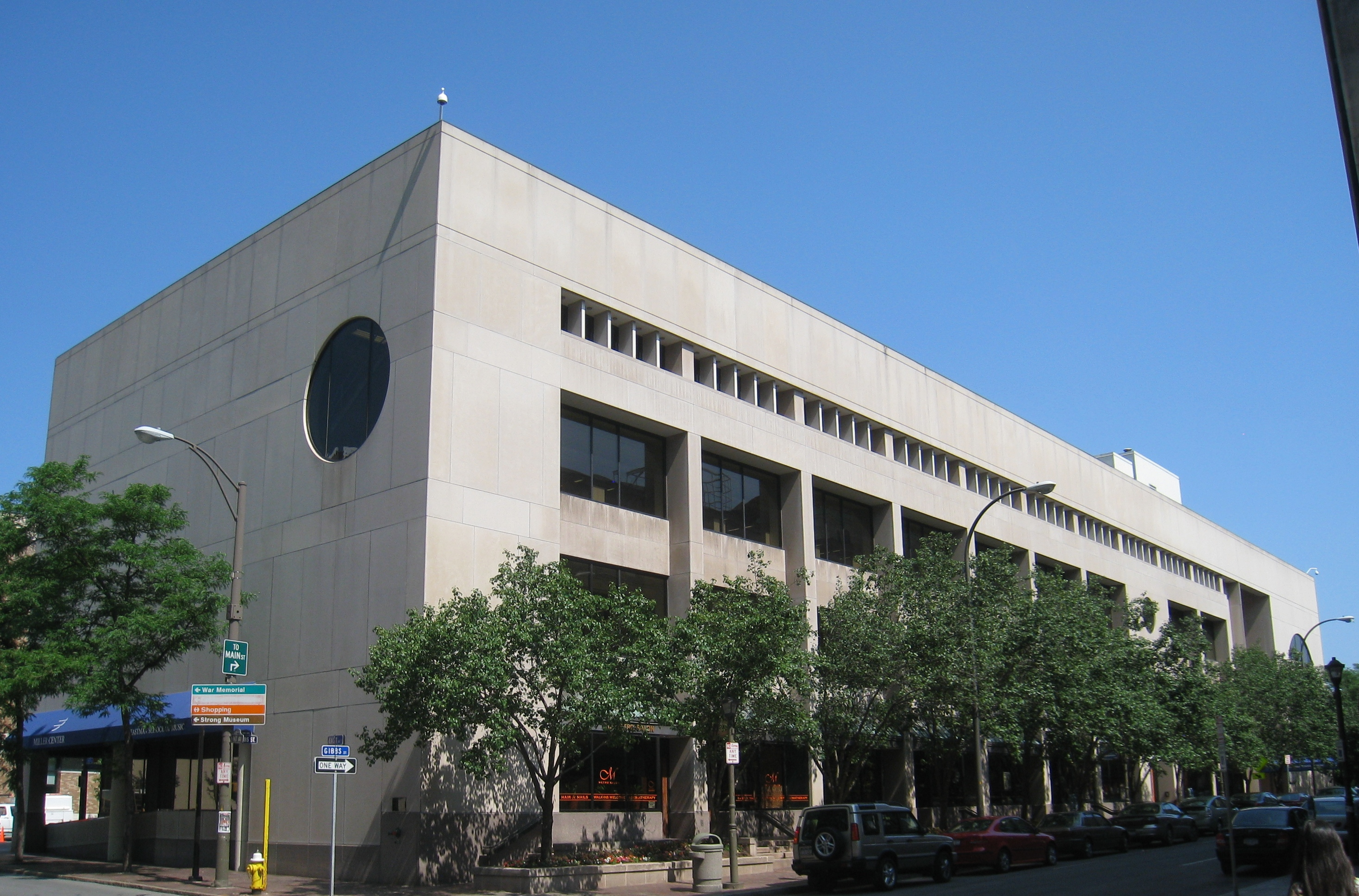
Sibley Music Library, in the Miller Center

The Sibley Music Library is the library of the Eastman School of Music of the University of Rochester in Rochester, NY. It was founded in 1904 by Hiram Watson Sibley (1845-1932), son of industrialist Hiram Sibley (1807-1888), and was at one time the largest university music library in the US. It's holdings consist of 344,000 books and scores; a sheet music collection approaching 150,000 items (largely uncataloged); 84,000 recordings on LP, CD, tape and video; 650 current journal subscriptions; and 14,000 microforms. The Ruth T. Watanabe Special Collections has over 150,000 rare items and archival collections.

== History ==
Mr. Sibley was prompted to found a music collection after Elbert Newton, a Rochester, NY church organist, suggested to him that such a collection would be of value to Rochester's music-loving public. The resulting collection was originally situated in Sibley Hall on the Arts College campus of the University of Rochester serving both the Rochester community and the University. In January, 1922, following an agreement by ESM founder George Eastman (1854-1932) and Hiram Watson Sibley, the collection was formally merged with the Eastman School of Music and was moved from its original home to the newly built Eastman School of Music in downtown Rochester.

By 1937 the library had outgrown its space within the Eastman School's main building, and an annex was erected at 44 Swan Street, the adjacent block. At that time the library was renamed from Sibley Musical Library to Sibley Music Library. Even after major renovations made to that building in 1976, the library once again outgrew its space, and eventually plans were made to erect a third building. The library moved to its current location in 1989 and now occupies 45,000 square feet (4,000 m²) on the 2nd, 3rd and 4th floors of the Miller Center building, formerly known as Eastman Place (re-named in 2004).

== Head librarians ==
Barbara Duncan, the first librarian, was also a founder of the Music Library Association.

- Barbara Duncan (1922-1947)
- Ruth T. Watanabe (1947-1984)
- Mary Wallace Davidson (1984-1999)
- Dan Zager (1999-2021)
- Jon Sauceda (2021- )
