= Clara Steuermann =

Clara Steuermann, born Clara Silvers, (February 10, 1922, – January 9, 1982, Norwalk, California) was an American music librarian, music editor, pianist, and archivist.

== Life and career ==
Born Clara Silvers in Los Angeles on February 10, 1922, she studied piano and music composition at Los Angeles City College prior to attending the University of California, Los Angeles (UCLA). At UCLA she was a composition pupil of Arnold Schoenberg and served as his teaching assistant. She also studied piano at UCLA with Jacob Gimpel. She graduated from UCLA with a BA in 1943 and a MA in 1944. She then pursued further studied at Black Mountain College.

Clara relocated to New York City to study piano privately with Eduard Steuermann at the suggestion of Schoenberg and Gimpel. She married Steuermann in 1949. In New York she worked as a music editor for several publishing firms; including Carl Fischer and Music Publishers Holding Corporation among others. She simultaneously was employed as the administrative assistant for the Juilliard Opera Theater from 1951 to 1964.

Steuermann reoriented her career into work as a librarian and archivist; pursuing graduate studies in that field at Columbia University where she graduated in 1964 with a MA in Library Science. She worked as a librarian at Kingsborough Community College (1964–1965), and then as a music librarian at the Juilliard School (1965–1966) and the Cleveland Institute of Music (1966–1975). She also was a librarian for the New York Philharmonic and the Metropolitan Opera in the mid-1960s. From 1975 until her death in 1982 she was the archivist of the Arnold Schönberg Institute of the University of California, Los Angeles. She was elected president of the Music Library Association; serving from 1975 to 1977. She was also an active member of the International Federation of Library Associations.
