= Notes (journal) =

- Discipline: Music librarianship
- Language: English

Publication details
- History: June 1934–present
- Publisher: Music Library Association (U.S.A.)
- Frequency: Quarterly

Standard abbreviations
- ISO 4: Notes

Indexing
- ISSN: 0027-4380

Links
- Journal homepage

Notes is a quarterly journal devoted to "music librarianship, music bibliography and discography, the music trade, and on certain aspects of music history." Published by the Music Library Association, Notes offers reviews on current music-related books, digital media, and sound recordings as well as inventories of publishers’ catalogs and materials recently received.

== History ==
=== First series ===
Debuting in July 1934, the first series of Notes produced fifteen issues in eight years. The journal's first editor, Eva Judd O'Meara, wrote in the first issue: “The notes were intended for a chorus of voices from all the music libraries in the group, but so far none have joined in, and one drones on alone, lamenting the other parts that were expected to give volume and tone to the performance”

Those first 23 pages of mimeographed notes included an article on the need to create subdivisions to the card catalog in order to accommodate the many works from or about Johann Sebastian Bach as well as a humorous column entitled "Wrong Notes" listing the common mistakes made by music students.

By May 1940, Notes had written its own constitution, doubled its membership and gained a "new dignity." The solitary voice that "droned on alone" in the first issue soon gained more voices, who took turns mimeographing the 15 issues of the first series. These included the Grosvenor Library in Buffalo, NY; the Sibley Music Library at the Eastman School of Music in Rochester, NY; the New York Public Library; The Newberry Library in Chicago; and the Boston Public Library. The first series concluded in December 1942.

=== Second series ===
One year later, in December 1943, the MLA issued the first volume of the second series, which continues to be published through present day. That first issue in 1943 celebrated the switch from "long, unwieldy, seemingly less permanent mimeographed sheets" of the first series to type-set pages, allowing for more space for articles as well as advertisements.

Article subjects include book reviews about modern musicians and groups like Johnny Cash or Nine Inch Nails, as well as classical composers such as Béla Bartók or Chopin. In later years, book reviews have been divided into sections: Times, Places, Peoples; American Highways and Byways; Twentieth Century Musics; Late Romantics; and Composers. Furthermore, the journal continues to publish articles pertaining to its focus and concern for issues related to the field of music librarianship, including collection development, concerns about digital media, scholarship in the field and bibliographies of musical and music-related works. Donald William Krummel wrote a sixty-year retrospective in 2004.

== Editors ==
The journal has had the following editors:

- Jonathan Sauceda, 2020–
- Deborah Campana, 2015–2020
- Jane Gottlieb, 2010–2015
- James P. Cassaro, 2004–2010
- Linda Solow Blotner, 2000–2004
- Richard Griscom, 1997–2000
- Daniel Zager, 1992–1997
- Michael Ochs, 1987–1992
- Susan T. Sommer, 1982–1987
- William McClellan, 1977–1982
- James Pruett, 1974–1977
- Frank C. Campbell, 1971–1974
- Harold E. Samuel, 1966–1970
- Edward N. Waters, 1963–1965
- William Lichtenwanger, 1961–1963
- Richard S. Hill, 1943–1961
- Charles Warren Fox, 1941–1942
- Eva Judd O'Meara, 1934–1940
