= Harvey J. Stokes =

American composer and oboist

- Born: 1957 (age 68–69)

Harvey J. Stokes (born 1957) is an American composer and oboist. As of 2020, he is Professor of Music at Hampton University in Hampton, Virginia, where he founded and directs a Computer Music Laboratory. Stokes earned his PhD from Michigan State University, where he studied with Jere Hutcheson and Charles Ruggerio, his MM from the University of Georgia, and his BM from East Carolina University. His previous teaching appointments include Miami University, Christopher Newport University, and the College of William and Mary.

Stokes is a highly-prolific composer, whose output includes 11 piano sonatas, 8 string quartets, at least 4 symphonies, and many other works for ensembles large and small. His style could be described as neoclassical, with tonal centers and a focus on polyphony.

His work has been programmed by numerous prominent organizations, including the Richmond Symphony, the Lancaster Symphony, the Virginia Beach Symphony, the Oxford String Quartet, and the New England Conservatory Contemporary Ensemble.

A respected educator, Stokes received the 2017-18 Edward L. Hamm Sr. Distinguished Teaching Award at Hampton University, and has been a consultant for The College Board, the Educational Testing Service, and the Educational Policy Improvement Center for the Advanced Placement (AP) in Music program.

Stokes has also written two books, A Selected Annotated Bibliography on Italian Serial Composers (Lewiston, ME: E. Mellen Press, 1989) and Compositional Language in the Oratorio The Second Act: The Composer as Analyst (Lewiston, ME: E. Mellen Press, 1992).
