= Norbert Sprongl =

Austrian composer

- Born: 30 April 1892; Schrattenthal, Austria-Hungary
- Died: 26 April 1983 (aged 90); Mödling, Austria
- Occupation: Composer

Norbert Sprongl (30 April 1892 – 26 April 1983) was an Austrian composer. His work was part of the music event in the art competition at the 1936 Summer Olympics.
