= Eitan Steinberg =

Israeli composer

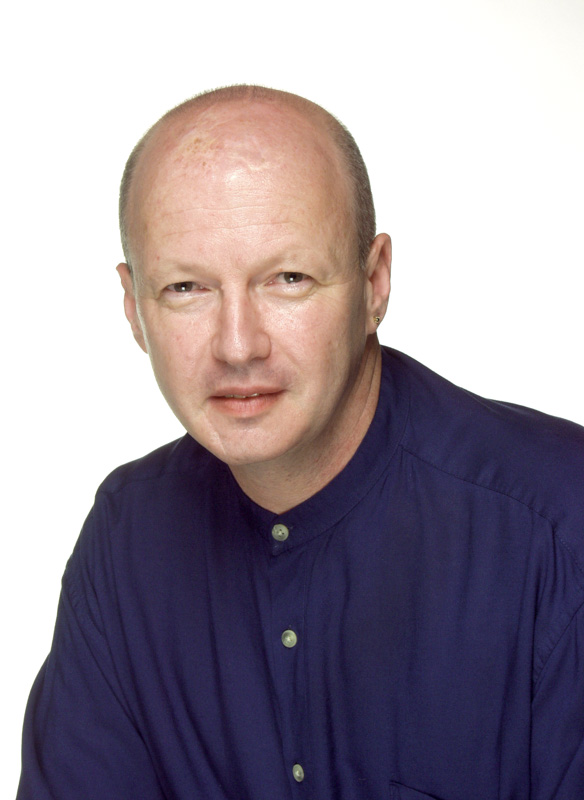
Eitan Steinberg

Eitan Steinberg (Hebrew: איתן שטיינברג; born 21 April 1955 in Jerusalem) is an Israeli composer. He studied under prominent composers and won multiple awards.

== Biography ==
Steinberg studied at the Jerusalem Academy of Music and Dance, the Accademia Musicale Chigiana, and the University of California, Berkeley. He was the pupil of Mark Kopytman, Richard Felciano, Luciano Berio, Peter Maxwell Davies, and Franco Donatoni. His compositions are performed in Israel, Europe and the United States. He composed over 20 works for his wife, vocalist Etty Ben-Zaken. Steinberg is a full professor at the Music Department of the University of Haifa.

== Reception ==
Steinberg won the Israel's Prime Minister's Composition Award in 2007, the Landau Prize in 2010, and the ACUM Lifetime Achievement Award in 2014.

The album Neharot which has performances from Steinberg, Kim Kashkashian, Betty Olivero and Tigran Mansurian peaked at position 14 on the Billboard classical albums chart for 4 weeks in 2009. The Arts Fuse wrote a review of one of Steinberg's concerts that states, "The marvel of Assembly of Souls is how composer Eitan Steinberg deploys diverse musical strategies from the ancient to the avant-garde and keeps them in productive juxtaposition and conscientious balance."
