= Music Library Association =

American music librarian professional organization

The Music Library Association (MLA) of the United States is the main professional organization for music libraries and librarians (including those whose music materials form only part of their responsibilities and collections). It also serves corporations, institutions, students, composers, scholars and others whose work and interests lie in the music librarianship field. National meetings occur annually.

In 2011, MLA officially merged with the International Association of Music Libraries, Archives and Documentation Centres (IAML). MLA is the US branch of IAML. "The full merger of IAML-US and MLA now allows us to represent the full spectrum of music librarianship in the United States and to participate as partners and equals with the other national branches of IAML."

== Purpose ==
"The purposes of the Association shall be to promote the establishment, growth, and use of music libraries; to encourage the collection of music and musical literature in libraries; to further studies in musical bibliography; to increase efficiency in music library service and administration; and to promote the profession of music librarianship. The Association is a non-stock, non-profit corporation organized and operated exclusively for said purposes. No part of the net earnings of the Association shall inure to the benefit of any individual. No officer, member, or delegate of a member shall, as such, receive compensation except that reasonable compensation may be paid for services of employees of the Association."

== Organization ==
The MLA is composed of five operational elements:

- Administration: officers of the MLA, including the board of directors, special officers, editors, and business office.
- Committees: groups formed to address specific issues in the (standing) categories of development, education, finance, membership, program and publications. Special committees are appointed by the president for administration, awards, bibliographic control, legislation, preservation, public libraries, reference and public service, and resource sharing and collection development. There are also joint committees involved with other institutions, such music organizations and academic institutions.
- Representatives and Liaisons: to external organizations involved in library and information science and/or music.
- Interest Groups: composed of MLA members, assembling during annual meetings. Interest Groups allow members to discuss specific issues not covered by committees.
- Regional Chapters: As stated on the MLA website, these chapters have two functions: "To promote cooperation among music librarians and among libraries within a given region" and "To provide a forum for discussion of library matters, some of which may be more specific or more regional in nature than those on programs at national meetings." Like the MLA, regional chapters have listservs that they use to distribute information to members.

Regional chapters include:

- Atlantic
- California
- Greater New York
- Midwest
- Mountain-Plains
- New England
- New York State- Ontario
- Pacific Northwest
- Southeast
- Texas

== Membership ==
The MLA offers membership on a yearly basis. Costs vary depending on the type of membership (institutional, associate, student, retired, etc.).

== Publications ==
The MLA produces several different publications covering different aspects of the field. Publications include:

- a quarterly newsletter (1969-2023)
- a membership handbook (ceased)
- Notes, Quarterly Journal of the Music Library Association
- Three series:
  - Basic Manual Series- "designed to assist the librarian in dealing with various aspects of the organization, administration and use of a music library."
  - Index and Bibliography Series- presenting resources for music and music literature, from discographies of popular music to bibliographies of subjects in ethnomusicology.
  - Technical Reports and Monographs in Music Librianship- viewing the hands-on aspects of the field, such as cataloging issues, audio equipment, and current research topics.

== Services ==
The MLA website offers a wide range of services and resources to members and non-members alike: employment and education information, awards and grant--s, copyright guidelines, and resources concerning the field. These include the MLA-L (a listserv open to the public), resources generated by the MLA committees and groups, external resources via print and web, and the MLA Shop, which is the organization's official store.

== History ==
The Music Library Association was founded in June 1931 during the American Library Association meetings in New Haven, Connecticut. Its founding was spearheaded by Eva Judd O'Meara (1884–1979) and Carleton Sprague Smith (1905–1994) of the New York Public Library. Among their objectives was to improve cataloging for sheet music and audio recordings.

== Presidents ==
2027 --- Holling J. Smith-Borne, Vanderbilt University
2025 — Bruce Evans, Baylor University
2023 — Paula Hickner, University of Kentucky
2021 — Liza Vick, University of Pennsylvania
2019 — Susannah Cleveland, Bowling Green State University / University of North Texas
2017 — Mark McKnight, University of North Texas
2015 — Michael Rogan, Tufts University
2013 — Michael D. Colby, UC Davis
2011 — Jerry L. McBride, Stanford University
2009 — Ruthann Boles McTyre (born 1954), University of Iowa
2007 — Philip R. Vandermeer, PhD, UNC Chapel Hill
2005 — Bonna Jean Boettcher, DMA (born 1958), Bowling Green State University / Cornell University
2003 — Laura Anne Dankner (born 1945), Loyola University New Orleans
2001 — James P. Cassaro (born 1954), University of Pittsburgh
1999 — Paula D. Matthews, Princeton
1997 — Diane Parr Walker (born 1953), University of Virginia
1995 — Jane Ellen Gottlieb (born 1954), Juilliard
1993 — Michael Ochs (born 1937), Harvard
1991 — Don L. Roberts (born 1938), Northwestern
1989 — Susan T. Sommer (1935–2008), New York Public Library
1987 — Lenore F. Coral (1939–2005), Cornell
1985 — Geraldine Esther Ostrove (born 1938), New England Conservatory
1983 — Mary Wallace Davidson (1935–2012), Eastman
1981 — Donald William Krummel, PhD (born 1929), University of Illinois at Urbana–Champaign
1979 — Ruth Taiko Watanabe (1916–2005), Eastman
1977 — Dena Julia Epstein (née Polacheck; born 1916), University of Chicago
1975 — Clara Steuermann (1922–1982)
1973 — James Worrell Pruett (born 1932), UNC Chapel Hill
1971 — William M. McClellan
1969 — Walter Gerboth
1967 — Frank C. Campbell
1966 — Hugh Wiley Hitchcock (1923–2007), Brooklyn College
1965 — Irving Lowens
1964 — William B. Weichlein
1963 — Philip Lieson Miller (1906–1996), New York Public Library
1962 — Rita Benton, PhD (née Rita Beatrice Rosenfeld; 1918–1980), University of Iowa
1961 — Vincent Harris Duckles (1913–1985), UC Berkeley
1960 — James Burrell Coover (1925–2004), Vassar
1958 — Brooks Shepard, Jr. (1922–1990), Yale
1956 — Virginia Cunningham, (née Virginia Adelaide Meeks; 1910–1996), Library of Congress
1954 — Charles Warren Fox (1904–1983), Eastman
1951 — Harold Spivacke (1904–1977), Library of Congress
1950 — Edward Eugene Colby (1912–2006), Stanford
1948 — Wilburn Scott Goldthwaite (1901–1981), University of Chicago
1946 — H. Dorothy Tilly (1892–1976)
1941 — Edward Neighbor Waters (1906–1991), Library of Congress
1939 — George Sherman Dickinson (1886–1964)
1937 — Carleton Sprague Smith (1905–1994), New York Public Library
1935 — William Oliver Strunk
1931 — Otto Kinkeldey

== See also ==
- List of libraries in the United States
