= Motoyuki Shitanda =

Japanese composer

- Born: August 26, 1952; Japan Osaka Prefecture
- Other name: 四反田 素幸
- Occupations: composer, music teacher, musicologist and conductor

Motoyuki Shitanda (四反田 素幸, Shitanda Motoyuki; born August 26, 1952 in Osaka Prefecture) is a contemporary Japanese composer, music teacher, musicologist and conductor.

== Biography ==
Shitanda studied at the Tokyo University of the Arts under Mareo Ishiketa (石桁眞禮生), Toshiro Mayuzumi and Kenjiro Urata (浦田健次郎) graduating in 1979 with a degree in music composition. He is currently professor at Akita University where he teaches composition. Also, he is part-time lecturer at Seirei Women's Junior College in Akita and guest lecturer at Trinity College of Music in London.

He has received several awards and distinctions including 1st prize in the 1985 Sasagawa Award Music Composition Competition for Festal March (1984), and 1st prize in the 1993 Asahi Composition Award for Hibiki no sobyō (響きの素描) (Sketch of Sound) (1990). Shitanda is a member of the Japan Federation of Composers and Bandmasters Academic Society of Japan (Academic Society of Japan for Winds Percussion and Band).

== Selected works ==
- Uchū no uta (宇宙のうた) (1995)
- Futari no shōzō (二人の肖像) (1998)
- Afternoon Lullaby (午後の子守歌, Gogo no komoriuta) (2000)
- Michi (道) (2000)
- Jumon (呪文) (2002)
- The Sea (海, Umi) (2003)
- Hi no kyoku (火の曲) (2004)
- Gekka san-ei (月下三詠) (2005)

Orchestra

- Symphony No.1 (1994)
- Symphony for the Citizens No.2 (市民のための交響曲第2番, Shimin no tame no kyōsōkyoku dai niban) (2003)

Concert band

- Festal March (フェスタル・マーチ) (1984)
- March in Blue (マーチ・イン・ブルー) (1988)
- Mural (壁画, Hekiga), Fantasia for Concert Band (1989)
- Hibiki no sobyō (響きの素描) (1990)

Concertante

- Concerto for viola and orchestra (1998)
- Karavinka (カラヴィンカ), Concerto for (25-string or 20-string) koto with string orchestra, percussion and harp (2008)

Chamber music

- Pastoral for flute and piano (1992)
- Fantasy for clarinet solo (1995)
- Retrospection (追憶, Tsuioku) for viola and piano (1997)
- The Voice of the Dryad (ドライアドの声, Doraiado no koe) for marimba (2005)

Works for traditional Japanese instruments

- Hiten gensō (飛天幻想) for koto and marimba (1999)
- Mugenka (夢幻歌) for koto ensemble (1986)
- Musaishū (夢採集) for 2 kotos (2004)
- Two Movements (独奏十七絃のための二章) for solo jūshichi-gen (1983)
- In a Grove (藪の中, Yabu no naka), Monodrama for male voice and jūshichi-gen (2000); after the short story by Ryūnosuke Akutagawa

Choral

- Winter (冬, Fuyu), Composition for female chorus and chamber orchestra (1981)
