= Charles Dubost =

Charles Dubost may refer to:

- Charles Dubost (lawyer)
- Charles Dubost (surgeon)
