= Dubost =

Dubost is a French surname. Notable people with the surname include:

- Antonin Dubost (1842–1921), French journalist and politician
- Charles Dubost (lawyer) (1905-1991), French lawyer
- Charles Dubost (surgeon) (1914-1991), French surgeon
- Coralie Dubost (born 1983), French politician
- Paulette Dubost (1910–2011), French actress
