= On reading =

- On'yomi, Japanese reading system
- "Sur la lecture", essay by Marcel Proust
