= Georges Belmont =

French writer and literary translator

Georges Belmont, born Georges Pelorson (19 July 1909 – 26 December 2008), was a French writer and literary translator. His translations from English to French included the work of Evelyn Waugh, Henry James, Henry Miller, Graham Greene, Anthony Burgess and Erica Jong into French. He also wrote ten novels and poetry collections, and worked as a journalist, founding the glossy celebrity magazine Jours de France.

== Life ==
Georges Pelorson was born in Belley, Bugey, the child of teachers. Educated at the ENS, he came to know Robert Brasillach, Thierry Maulnier, Samuel Beckett, André Gide and Jean Paulhan. He befriended Henry Miller, whose work he would translate. Briefly in the Vichy government in the second world war, he then became a journalist. After working as an editor at Paris Match, he founded and edited Jours de France in 1958.

Belmont collected and published the memoires of Proust's housekeeper, Céleste Albaret, as Monsieur Proust (1973). He published his own autobiography in 2001.

== Works ==
=== Translations ===
- Hiroshima by John Hersey. Paris: Robert Laffont, 1947.
- Le sourire au pied de l'échelle = The smile at the foot of the ladder by Henry Miller. Paris: Corrêa, 1953. Bilingual edition with English and French on opposite pages.
- Autobiographie ou Mes expériences de vérité by Gandhi. 1964. Translated from The Story of My Experiments with Truth.
- Tropique du Capricorne by Henry Miller. Paris: Stock, 1972. Translated from Tropic of Capricorn
- (tr. with Hortense Chabrier) Le facteur humain: roman by Graham Greene. Paris: Laffont, 1978. Translated from The Human Factor.
- (tr. with Léo Dilé) Ce sacré Hemingway by Anthony Burgess. Paris: Fayard, 1979.

=== Novels ===
- Un homme au crépuscule; roman, Paris: R. Julliard, 1966
- Ex, roman, Paris: Denoël, 1969

=== Non-fiction ===
- Entretiens de Paris: Henry Miller avec Georges Belmont, 1970. Translated by Antony Macnabb and Harry Scott as Face to face with Henry Miller: conversations with Georges Belmont, London, 1971; Henry Miller in conversation with Georges Belmont, Chicago, 1972
- Monsieur Proust, 1973.

- Albaret, Céleste (1976). Belmont, Georges (ed.). Monsieur Proust: a memoir. Translated by Bray, Barbara. New York: McGraw-Hill.

- Marilyn Monroe and the camera, London: Bloomsbury, 1989. (Interview originally published in Marie Claire, 1960.)
- Souvenirs d'outre-monde: histoire d'une naissance, Paris: Calmann-Lévy, 2001
