= René Küss =

French urologist and transplant surgeon (1913–2006)

Professor René Küss
- Born: 3 May 1913
- Died: 2006 (aged 92–93)
- Education: University of Paris School of Medicine
- Occupations: Urologist; Transplant surgeon
- Known for: Extraperitoneal kidney transplant xenotransplantation

René Küss (3 May 1913 – 2006) was a French urologist and transplant surgeon who made pioneering contributions in renal tract surgery and kidney transplantation with the establishment of transplant programs. At a time of unavoidable transplant rejection, he was involved in two particularly historic transplant operations. The first was a human-to-human extraperitoneal kidney transplant procedure in 1951 and later a pig-to-human kidney transplant in 1966, both of which ended in abrupt rejection. He later introduced kidney transplantation schedules involving at first irradiation, later immunosuppressants, living-related and unrelated donors and later organs from deceased donors.

Küss established several urology departments at the Paris hospitals, became General Secretary and between 1952 and 1985 took up presidency for the Société Internationale d'Urologie. In 1971, he founded the first scientific society devoted to transplantation medicine in Europe, La Société Francaise de Transplantation.

Although they worked separately, the simultaneous efforts of Küss and nephrologist Jean Hamburger are felt by transplant peers including Nobel prize winner Joseph Murray, to have "largely been forgotten", and that they have not been given "full credit for their work internationally".

== Early life and education ==
René Küss was born on 3 May 1913 into a Protestant family from Alsace. He grew up with firm morals and responsibilities, being the son of a distinguished and wealthy surgeon who was at one time president of the French Academy of Surgery. Küss's grandfather's brother was Émile Küss, a physician at the University of Strasbourg and the last mayor of Strasbourg prior to its annexation by Germany. His father headed the general surgical department at Paris's Hôpital de la Charité, later known as the Hopital Broussais. Küss recalled first attending an operating theatre with his father at the age of seven. He had two brothers and two sisters and his family spent time travelling between their homes by the seaside, on the mountains and in Paris, in pursuit of sports and arts.

He was educated at the University of Paris School of Medicine and held an appointment as a surgical resident at the Hôpital Broca, Paris, under the chief of service, Robert Proust, the brother of the author Marcel Proust.

== Second World War ==
Küss left his early medical training at the age of 26 to enlist in the French army during the Second World War, and subsequently became physician to the French navy. He survived the attack on Mers-el-Kébir as physician-in-chief on the destroyer Mogador, which was bombed and eventually sunk off the coast of North Africa in the Scuttling of the French fleet in Toulon. On one occasion, he jumped overboard into the "oil-slick-covered sea to rescue crewmen". He received the War Cross with Palm for his war efforts. He headed General George Patton's 3rd American army's surgical team across France and into Germany and by "alternately manipulating scalpels and grenades", contributed to the efforts of the French resistance to liberate Paris. The whole time, he operated on both American and German injured soldiers.

== Surgical career ==
After the war, Küss made innovations in urology at the Cochin Hospital, in particular in urinary drainage and vascular reconstructions in transplant cases. This came at a time when urology and vascular surgery were expanding as specialities with new diagnostics, particularly the introduction of intravenous pyelography in 1937 and David Hume's vascular developments on joining arteries. He developed the Boari-Küss method for elongating the ureter and contributed to the elaboration of placing a donor kidney into the extraperitoneal space or iliac fossa, a technique that has continued into the 21st century.

Two operations are particularly considered "historic" by contemporaries. Küss, together with Charles Dubost and Marceau Servelle, was involved in the first human-to-human extraperitoneal kidney transplant procedure on 12 January 1951. Another two surgeons, Oeconomos and Rougeulle, had previously assisted Küss with the laboratory experiments and were also present to assist. The procedure became known as the "Küss operation" owing to his chief role in it. Organs from four guillotined prisoners were used in four of the five kidney transplants. One kidney came from a living donor undergoing a kidney removal in a Matson procedure for hydrocephalus, where a kidney would otherwise be discarded. All the grafts were rejected.

At the time, it was not unusual to carry out the donor operation on the prison floor or in the autopsy room. In one interview, Küss "admitted that sometimes the surgeons had to wait ‘like vultures’ for the patient (donor) to die" and that even "one of the donor kidneys was procured from a living patient". Lack of immunosuppressants, poorly preserved donor kidneys, suboptimal state of recipients and lack of post-operative intensive care, all contributed to poor initial results. By 1952, he was led to believe that America would have the best chance of success by performing the transplants on identical twins, which in 1954, they did.

The second historic operation took place in 1966, by which time irradiation as an immunosuppressive and some basic immunosuppressants, 6-mercaptopurine and cortisone, had been introduced. After reading results of experimental studies by Roy Calne, Küss had already administered 6-mercaptopurine six years earlier. Küss, along with assistant surgeon Jacque Poisson, performed a cross-species procedure, transplanting two pig kidneys into one patient. The graft was unsuccessful instantly and the patient shortly died. Küss later described this as a painful experience. Transplant surgeon and friend of Küss, Thomas Starzl recalled that Küss "was left with a lifetime xenophobia for xenografts" following this experience. Results remained poor and by 1967, the failure rate amongst the 101 transplants he performed was around 50%.

Küss established several urology departments at the Paris hospitals, became General Secretary and in 1952 took up presidency for the Société Internationale d'Urologie, where he remained so until 1985. In order to advance the urology clinic at the University Pitié-Salpêtrière Hospital, in 1972, he resigned from private practice. He simultaneously established the La Société Francaise de Transplantation. Retiring from clinical duties in 1985, he later, in the 1990s, served as President of the French National Academy of Medicine. He was awarded Commander of the French Legion of Honor and in 2002 became a Medawar Laureate of the Transplantation Society.

== Personal ==
Among Küss's girlfriends was a showgirl from the well known Le Lido. He eventually married in his mid-forties, at the request of his father, and went on to have four children.

Küss was a racecar driver and competed in the Monte Carlo Rally. There was one incident in 1954 when he lay comatose for some days following an accident during a race at the Tour de France Automobile.

He was brought up with a deep interest in art and acquainted with eminent Parisian artists of the time including Raoul Dufy. He added to his father's antique and contemporary art collections, subsequently exhibiting them near his second home at the seaside village of Honfleur. His art collection was auctioned at Christie's in Paris in 2006, following his death. One part of his collection that including work by Henri Toulouse-Lautrec, Pierre-Auguste Renoir and Claude Monet, sold for more than four million Euros.

== Death and legacy ==
Küss died in 2006. An engraved memorial marble lies at the hospital of Pitié‐Salpêtrière where he established a school of urology.

In 2014, The Board of the European Association Urology (EAU) Section of Transplantation Urology (ESTU) awarded the first René Küss Prize for original work on renal transplantation. It was presented by Küss's daughter, Ms. Sophie Morello-Küss.

Although they worked separately, the simultaneous efforts of Küss and nephrologist Jean Hamburger are felt by transplant peers including Nobel Prize winner Joseph Murray, to have "largely been forgotten", and they not to have been given "full credit for their work internationally".

== Selected publications ==
- Surgery of the Ureter, Springer-Verlag, 1975, ISBN 978-3-642-66081-8 doi:10.1007/978-3-642-66079-5
- Kuss, R; Teinturier, J; Milliez, P (1951). "[Some attempts at kidney transplantation in man]". Mem Acad Chir (Paris). 77 (22–24): 755–64. PMID 14874917.

In addition, he co-authored

- Histoire Illustre ́e de L’Urologie
- An Illustrated History of Organ Transplantation.
