= Pastiches et mélanges =

Literary work

- First edition
- Author: Marcel Proust
- Language: French
- Genre: Modernist
- Publication date: 1919
- Publication place: France

Pastiches et mélanges ("Pastiches and mixtures") is a collection of accounts of the Lemoine case by Marcel Proust, as recounted in the style of sundry classical French authors (namely Balzac, Flaubert, Sainte-Beuve, Henri de Régnier, Michelet, Faguet, Renan and Saint-Simon); it was released in 1919.

The compilation has 277 pages.
