= Céleste Albaret =

French essayist (1891–1984)

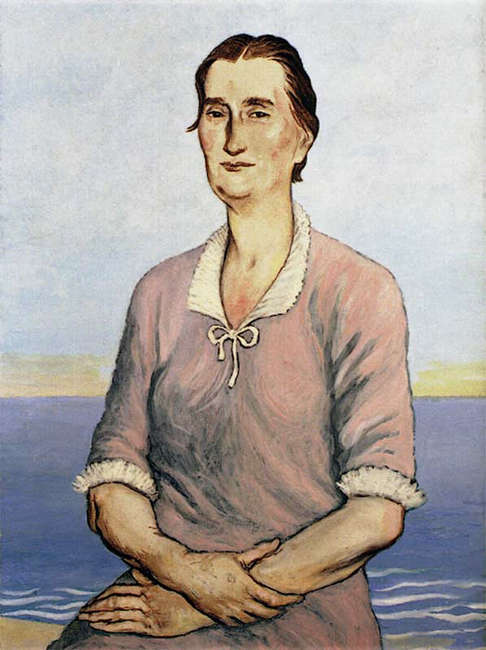
- Céleste Albaret, servante de l'écrivain français Marcel Proust Jean-Claude Fourneau, 1957
- Born: Augustine Célestine Gineste; 17 May 1891; Auxillac, Lozère, France
- Died: 25 April 1984 (aged 92); Montfort-l'Amaury, Yvelines, France
- Occupations: House keeper ("Gouvernante"); Hotelier; Museum caretaker-guide
- Known for: her work for Marcel Proust
- Spouse: Odilon Albaret
- Children: Odile Gévaudan-Albaret

Céleste Albaret (née Gineste; 17 May 1891 – 25 April 1984) was a country woman who moved to Paris in 1913 when she married the taxi driver Odilon Albaret; she is best known for being the writer and essayist Marcel Proust's housekeeper and secretary. Lonely and bored in the capital, and at her husband's suggestion, Albaret began to run errands for Proust, who was her husband's most regular client. Before very long she became his secretary and housekeeper. During the final decade of Proust's life, when his health declined and he became progressively more withdrawn, even while working with continuing intensity on his writing, she became his nurse and "the writer’s most trusted conduit to the world beyond his reclusive, cork-lined bedroom".

Marcel Proust died in 1922 and Albaret moved on to run a small Paris hotel, together with her husband and daughter. Odilon Albaret died in 1960, by which time the hotel had been sold and Albaret had become the caretaker-guide at a museum at Montfort-l'Amaury, on the western edge of Paris. In the early 1970s she was persuaded by the Laffont publishing company that she should disclose what she could concerning the private life of Marcel Proust, who was still an iconic literary figure among the intellectual classes. She dictated seventy hours of taped material to Georges Belmont, a journalist-translator with a reputation built on interviews with American movie-stars and translations into French of anglophone novels by Anthony Burgess, Graham Greene, Henry James, Henry Miller and others. The resulting biographical portrait of Proust provided many hitherto unknown details, although the overall picture was in most respects reassuringly consistent with information already provided by Proust in his novels and elsewhere. It was well received by critics. Albaret's recollections of her employer were popularised through the release of Percy Adlon's film Céleste (1982) which was based on Belmont's book.

== Life ==
Augustine Célestine Gineste was born into a "peasant family" at Auxillac, a small village (subsequently subsumed for administrative purposes into La Canourgue) in the hills inland from Montpellier in central southern France. She grew up in a relatively large farm house with her parents, her sister Marie and her brother, thinking never to leave home. Her mind was changed by Odilon Albaret, "a very kind good looking boy with a fine moustache after the fashion of the time" ("un garçon très gentil avec un bon visage rond et de bonnes moustaches comme à l'époque"). Ten years older than she, Albaret was already "doing taxi work" in the far away capital. He had moved to Paris in 1907 and was in possession of "a fine red taxi". The owner of the taxi business that employed him was none other than Jacques Bizet, a childhood friend of Marcel Proust and son to Georges Bizet, the composer of Carmen.

In 1913 Célestine Gineste left the village of her birth for the first time in her life. She married Albaret on 28 March 1913. In 1914, through the intervention of her husband with his illustrious regular client, she was "asked to fill in for a few days", and permitted to undertake errands for Marcel Proust, delivering letters and books. It may have been as the result of the outbreak of war in July of that year, and the resulting difficulties of "recruiting staff" as the higher wages offered by the munitions barons tempted many women to switch to factory work after their menfolk were called away to join the army, that despite her relative youth she very soon became one of Proust's household servants. The Albarets moved in (although Odilon Albaret was almost at once called away for the next four years by the war). A key point came when Albaret was invited to involve herself in the great man's "breakfast" ritual, which took place at or soon after four o'clock each afternoon, as Proust rang his bell two times in order to be served with two large bowls of strong milky coffee and two croissants. Breakfast was served in his darkened bedroom and in silence. Around this time Proust dismissed the woman for whom she had been "filling in" as Albaret took her place.

"We were both orphans — he with his parents dead and his friends scattered, and I with my parents dead, my family far away, and my husband in the army. So we created our own sort of intimacy, though for him it was chiefly an atmosphere within which to work, while I forgot about my own tasks and could see nothing but a magic circle."'

Céleste Albaret, quoted by Georges Belmont and André Aciman
(translation: Barbara Bray)

There was always an appropriate distancing of class, status and background between master and servant, but also a growing practical and spiritual interdependency. Albaret proved hugely loyal, quick witted and adaptable enough to accommodate her employer's idiosyncratic habits, becoming largely nocturnal in order to be on hand when Proust was awake and available to clean his room if he went out. When he came home in the early hours of the morning she would wait up for him (he never carried the key for his apartment). If he wanted to talk she would listen. After she became a full-time member of the household staff Proust invited her to address him directly, rather than by using the third person singular. She agreed at once, though she had absolutely no idea who or what this third person singular was. Proust recommended what she should read. She read The Three Musketeers by Alexandre Dumas at his prompting, though she rejected his suggestion that she should read Balzac. Despite her employer's urgings, she never took to keeping a diary.

Apart from making coffee and serving the croissants, one task that Albaret was not called upon to perform was cooking her employer's meals. Cooking did not take place at home. She was, however, mandated to telephone meal orders to the fine city restaurants: these were dispatched with minimal delay to the address at 102 Boulevard Haussmann. Permanently ill by this time, Proust ate little by the (middle-and upper class) standards of Paris at those times, and he hardly drank. A meal might consist of a little of the white meat from a chicken or a filet of sole, washed down, on rare occasions, with a little flute of Champagne or of Bordeaux, which would suffice. The only meal which he really revered was the coffee and croissants, which he consumed as his tea-time "breakfast". Sources speculate that a more varied diet might have buttressed his failing health more effectively. It would, however, be wrong to think that he was wholly inflexible in his "breakfast" routine. Towards the end of the war, in 1917, croissants disappeared from the bakeries and he developed a taste for Sablé biscuits that replaced the croissants on his breakfast tray. Proust's celebrity status meant that many suppliers were willing to adapt to his unconventional timetable. The kitchens at the Hotel Ritz remained open longer than those of most establishments, but even here the kitchens were not, for most of his purposes, staffed and accessible through the night. Albaret held her own key, however, in order that she might be able to access the hotel kitchens at any point during the night, should her employer require a chilled beer.

During the war, with many of his younger friends and associates away at the front, and cafe society for those who remained very much diminished, Proust became increasingly reclusive: that trend intensified as his health deteriorated during the postwar period. The reduction in his social life seemed to intensify his need to write. Albaret enabled him to remain creative. She wrote down texts as he dictated them to her and became important as a point of contact with the outside world. Some sources attest that she also provided inspiration for his descriptions of certain character traits.

Proust had always said that it would be Albaret's hands that would close his eyes when he died ("Ce sont vos belles petites mains qui me fermeront les yeux."). It seems likely that the prediction came true. She was certainly present in her employer's bedroom, with the writer's brother, the urologist and gynaecologist Robert Proust, when Marcel Proust died. At Robert's request she cut a lock of his older brother's hair which made an appearance in 1965 at a "Proust exhibition" held in central Paris at the French National Library. In 2008, it was listed for auction by the Sotheby's auction house.

Albaret remained fiercely loyal to her famous employer until (and long after) his death in 1922. As his posthumous reputation soared Albaret made a point of shunning publicity and avoiding any mention of her former employer's personal life that might have been construed as disloyal. With her husband she opened a hotel along the Rue des Canettes, the Hotel Alsace Lorraine, later renamed the Hotel La Perle, which the couple ran with their daughter, Odile.

The hotel was probably sold around 1954, by which time Odilon Albaret was close to retirement age. Albaret worked with her sister, Marie Gineste, between 1954 and 1970 at Le Belvédère in Montfort-l'Amaury (Yvelines). This was the house where Maurice Ravel had lived between 1921 and his death, and which now functioned as a small museum dedicated to the composer. Under the terms of a "convention de gardiennage" which the sisters signed with Edouard Ravel, they agreed to look after the house for a term of twenty years. Their responsibilities also involved showing visitors round. Later Albaret would admit to having talked far more about Proust than about Ravel when visitors came ("y avoir beaucoup plus parlé de M. Proust que de Ravel aux visiteurs").

Odilon Albaret died in 1960. By this time almost all the celebrities that – thanks to Proust – Albaret had known as a young woman were gone. Proust's own reputation lived on, however, and during the 1960s Albaret was "rediscovered" by members of the arts and culture establishment, notably by Roger Stéphane in connection with the 1971 television "fiction documentary" "Proust, l'art et la douleur" (and subsequent productions). Someone else who showed an interest in Albaret's recollections of Proust was the collector-philanthropist (and passionate bibliophile) Jacques Guérin, described by one reviewer as "not just a collector but a rescuer of all things Proustian".

It was on the advice of Guérin that during the early 1970s Albaret broke her fifty years silence on her time working for Marcel Proust. "After observing that others, less scrupulous than she, had talked and written about Proust things that were not always true, she decided to fulfill this one last duty to the one who had always said to her 'you are the one who will close my eyes [when I die]' and who had always addressed her as 'My dear Céleste'". She dictated seventy hours of taped material to the journalist-translator Georges Belmont. The result, appearing in 1973, was the book "Monsieur Proust: Souvenirs recueillis par Georges Belmont" ("Monsieur Proust: Remembrances collected by Georges Belmont."). She also agreed to sell to Guérin several items that Proust had given her: these have subsequently become some of the most sought after Proustian treasures among French book fanatics.

The Belmont book was well received by critics, and also resonated beyond the literary elite; it was translated, amongst other languages, into English. A few years before she died, in tribute to a remarkable woman who participated intimately in a core element of France's literary history, and who personally contributed in practical ways to the creation and preservation of historical texts, Albaret was created a Commander of the Order of Arts and Letters.

== Works ==
- Albaret, Céleste (1976). Belmont, Georges (ed.). Monsieur Proust: a memoir. Translated by Bray, Barbara. New York: McGraw‐Hill.

== Legacy ==
Marcel Proust knew how important Céleste Albaret was to him. He told her husband:

- "Just tell her that if ever she left I would not be able to go on with my work."
- "Dites-lui bien que, si jamais elle partait, je ne pourrais plus continuer à travailler."

Proust immortalised his housekeeper as Françoise in "À la recherche du temps perdu". There is also a character called Célestine in "Sodome et Gomorrhe".

He wrote a poem to her:

Grande, fine, belle et maigre,
Tantôt lasse, tantôt allègre,
Charmant les princes comme la pègre,
Lançant à Marcel un mot aigre,
Lui rendant pour le miel le vinaigre,
Spirituelle, agile, intègre,
Telle est la nièce de Nègre.

Tall, elegant, beautiful and thin
Sometimes worn out, sometimes animated
Charming princes, like the underworld
Throwing Marcel [Proust] an acid comment
Trading honey for vinegar,
Spiritual, adept, incorruptible
That's Albert Nègre's niece (Note: Albaret's brother had married a niece of Archbishop Nègre. Her brother, therefore, might have been described as Nègre's nephew by marriage; describing Albaret as his niece may be ascribed to Proust's poetic license.)

== See also ==
- 102 Boulevard Haussmann, a BBC production set in 1916
- Céleste, a German film dramatising part of Proust's life, seen from the viewpoint of Albaret
- Laure Hillerin, French biographer of Céleste Albaret
