= 102 Boulevard Haussmann =

- Written by: Alan Bennett
- Directed by: Udayan Prasad
- Starring: Alan Bates; Janet McTeer; Jonathan Coy; Paul Rhys; Celia Imrie
- Music by: The Delme String Quartet
- Country of origin: United Kingdom
- Original language: English

Production
- Producer: Innes Lloyd
- Cinematography: John Hooper
- Editor: Ken Pearce
- Running time: 74 minutes

Original release
- Network: BBC
- Release: 17 February 1991

102 Boulevard Haussmann is a 1990 British biographical drama film written by Alan Bennett and directed by Udayan Prasad. It is based on the life of French novelist Marcel Proust in 1916, during his residency at 102 Boulevard Haussmann in Paris, France.

The film stars Alan Bates, Janet McTeer, Jonathan Coy, Paul Rhys and Celia Imrie. It was screened at the London Film Festival on 9 November 1990 and aired on BBC 2 on 17 February 1991.

Prasad won a Golden Gate Award in Best of Category: Television Feature from the San Francisco International Film Festival, and the drama was also nominated for a British Academy Television Award for Best Single Drama.

== Plot ==
Set in 1916 during World War I, Marcel Proust lives a nocturnal, closeted life in Paris, obsessed by his writing and looked after by his devoted housekeeper Céleste Albaret. Proust has sequestered himself to a bed in his sound proofed bedroom, where he is writing his latest work. On a rare visit to a concert, he becomes fascinated by the music of a string quartet, which includes a young viola player, Amable Massis, a war veteran who he befriends. He invites the musicians to play a private performance for him in his apartment, where they perform César Franck's Quartet in D. Proust invites the young Massis back to his apartment on numerous occasions to play for him, but Massis is unaware of the true nature of Proust's feelings towards him.

== Cast ==
- Alan Bates as Marcel Proust
- Janet McTeer as Céleste Albaret
- Paul Rhys as Amable Massis
- Jonathan Coy as Odilon
- Celia Imrie as Madame Massis
- Philip McGough as Dr. Bize
- Philip Rham as Gaston Poulet
- Peter Geeves as Louis Ruyssen
- Michael Wilcox as Victor Gentil

== Production notes ==
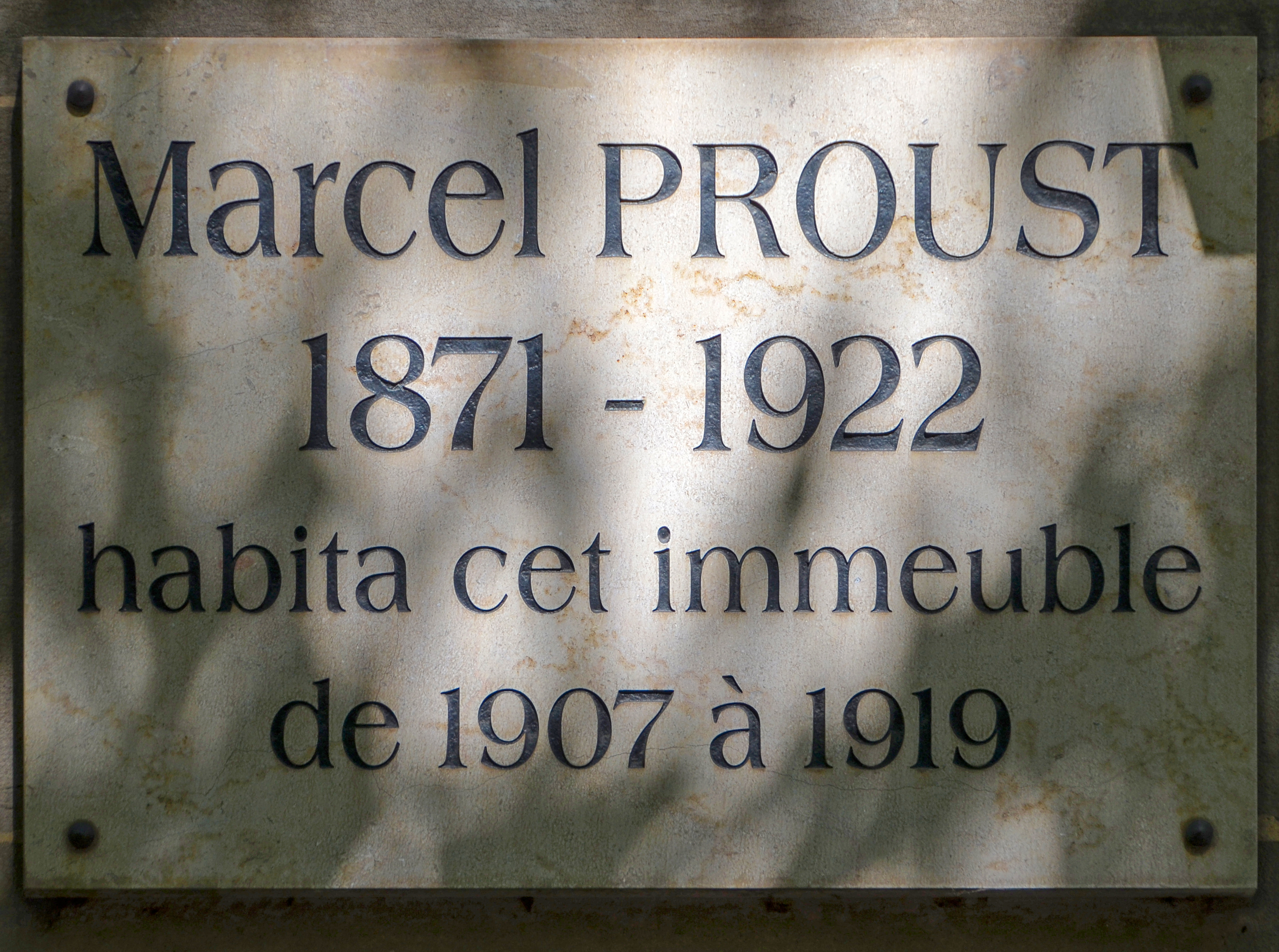
Plaque at 102 Boulevard Haussmann, where Proust lived

Director Udayan Prasad said the relationship between Proust and Céleste is portrayed in the film "like an old married couple", and the idea is that Céleste created the reclusive environment which enabled Proust to work. Prasad also revealed that the "script has its own reality", and we didn't pretend for the drama to be a "documentary about what Proust did in that short period of time".

Writer Alan Bennett made the point in the script about wanting to "show people who are artistically engaged in the process of creativity as being barely human". Prasad described Alan Bates as engaging in a "sinister charm," that created a "Proust who is both dislocated from the outside world and in control of his own".

== Critical reception ==
Elaine Paterson wrote in Time Out that the film is "absorbing and affecting. Its underlying musing on the nature of genius may be a meander up an intellectual cul-de-sac, but the cul-de-sac is beautifully shot, set in a space and time entirely of its own, and governed by two extraordinary characters". TV critic Kevin Thomas said writer Alan Bennett "tells of an incident in Proust's life that allows us to see the Proust-Celeste relationship from a different - and disturbing - angle". Thomas also questioned the motives of Celeste and Proust's physician (Philip McGough), after Proust begins courting the young viola player. Thomas wonders, "are they interested merely in protecting Proust's health? Or do they feel that Proust, as a homosexual, somehow has to be protected from himself? In any event, their actions are outrageous, and all the more so for not actually sparing Proust any pain".

John J. O'Connor, said that Alan Bennett created an "extraordinarily complex universe, exploring with painstaking detail shifting relationships and subtle controls, esthetic theory and sexual obsessions, indeed life and art". He also praised Alan Bates as capturing "the underlying strength of the writer", and "lending enormous support is the music, performed by the Delmé String Quartet". Sheila Whitaker of the San Francisco Film Society wrote that Alan Bennett "created a sympathetic and understated script", that is "dense with inflection and nuance rather than action, and the performances of Alan Bates as Proust and Janet McTeer as Celeste match Bennett's achievement". Director Udayan Prasad won a Golden Gate Award from the Film Festival.

== See also ==
- Céleste
- In Search of Lost Time
- Screen Two
- List of made-for-television films with LGBT characters
