= Laure Hillerin =

French historian, journalist and writer (born 1949)

Laure Hillerin (born 1949) is a French historian, biographer and writer. She lectures about her biographical subjects and their times to public audiences, and on radio and television.

== Biography ==
Hillerin was born 2 November 1949 in Paris. After earning a degree in literature, she worked for thirty years as an independent communications consultant while she researched and wrote her first books. She then devoted herself to writing well researched and sourced historical biographies from 19th and 20th century France, each written as if it was a "true novel."

After publishing her book titled The Duchess of Berry, she became particularly interested in the time of Europe's Belle Époque (1871–1914), from which Hillerin chose to research other forgotten yet intriguing historical figures. Her book about Countess Greffulhe, who captivated Parisian high society for over half a century, includes a description of her little-known influence on her era and how she became an important inspiration for the French novelist and essayist Marcel Proust.

Hillerin's book titled For Better or for Worse is about the French nobleman Boni de Castellane and his American socialite wife Anna Gould, known at that time as "the coveted heiress to the largest fortune in America." Hillerin described a famously combative couple who lived through the splendor of the Belle Époque and the collapse of old Europe, and who constructed the exquisite and legendary residence, Palais Rose de l'avenue Foch, in Paris (not to be confused with another Pink Palace in Yvelines, France). In 1969, the Avenue Foch palace was destroyed by the couple's heirs to make way for a modern building.

Her next subject, Céleste Albaret, was a woman from a peasant family in the mountains of central France who devoted her life to Marcel Proust, enabling him to work on his writings. Albaret married the writer's chauffeur and entered Proust's service in August 1914 as his housekeeper, but soon she became his muse and inspiration, and nurse. After his death in 1922, Albaret dedicated the rest of her life to protecting his name and work. For her dedication, Albaret was made a Commander of the French Order of Arts and Letters.

=== Honors ===
Hillerin serves on the jury for the Céleste Albaret prize. She received the prize in 2015 for her biography La comtesse Greffulhe: L'Ombre des Guermantes, which was also awarded the Simone-Veil prize and the Geneviève Moll coup de cœur prize for biography.

She is a member of the Society of Friends of Marcel Proust and of the Friends of Combray and of the Proustian literary circle of Cabourg-Balbec and a member of the SGDL (Society of People of Letters).

== Selected works ==
- Charles and Camilla: The Secrets of a Passion. Albin Michel, 1998, 333 p. ISBN 978-2-226-10522-6
- 2000 and One Night. First Editions, 1999, 227 p. ISBN 978-2-87691-529-9
- "On ne prêt que les riche: Mémoires d'un prince de l'arnaque" (Only the rich get loans: Memoirs of a Prince of Swindling), with Armand de La Rochefoucauld. Albin Michel, 2001, 307 p. ISBN 978-2-226-12047-2
- The Indiscreet Drawer: Ardent and Shameless Correspondence of Two Lovers During the Revolution, novel. Mercure de France, coll. "Le Mercure galant", 2005, 160 p. ISBN 978-2-7152-2578-7
- The Duchess of Berry: The Rebel Bird of the Bourbons. Flammarion Publishers, "Great Biographies" series, 2010, 541 pp. ISBN 978-2-08-122880-1. Reissued in November 2016
- Countess Greffulhe: The Shadow of the Guermantes. Flammarion, 2014, 570 pp. ISBN 978-2-08-129054-9. Reissued in 2018 in the Libre Champs Flammarion paperback collection ISBN 978-2-08-142237-7
- Proust for Laughs: A Jubilant Breviary of In Search of Lost Time. Flammarion, 2016, 338 pp. ISBN 978-2-08-138710-2. Reissued in May 2022 in the Champs Essais Flammarion paperback collection ISBN 978-2-08-028344-3
- For better or for worse: The tumultuous life of Anna Gould and Boni de Castellane. Flammarion Publishers, 2019 ISBN 978-2-08-142713-6
- In Search of Céleste Albaret: The Unpublished Investigation into Marcel Proust's Captive. Flammarion, 2021 ISBN 978-2-08-023243-4 Reissued in March 2024 in the Libre Champs Flammarion paperback collection ISBN 978-2-08-043905-5

== Awards and distinctions ==
=== Prizes ===
- 2010: Shortlisted for the Chateaubriand prize for La Duchesse de Berry: L'Oiseau rebelle des Bourbons
- 2015: Céleste Albaret prize for Countess Greffulhe: The Shadow of the Guermantes
- 2015: Simone-Veil Special Jury Prize for Countess Greffulhe: The Shadow of the Guermantes
- 2015: Geneviève Moll Prize for Biography winner for Countess Greffulhe: The Shadow of the Guermantes
- 2021: Geneviève Moll Prize for Biography for In Search of Céleste Albaret: The Unpublished Investigation into Marcel Proust's Captive
- 2022: Goncourt Prize for Biography shortlisted for In Search of Céleste Albaret: The Unpublished Investigation into Marcel Proust's Captive

=== Distinction ===
- 2021: Knight of the Order of Arts and Letters
