= Madeleine Lemaire =

French painter

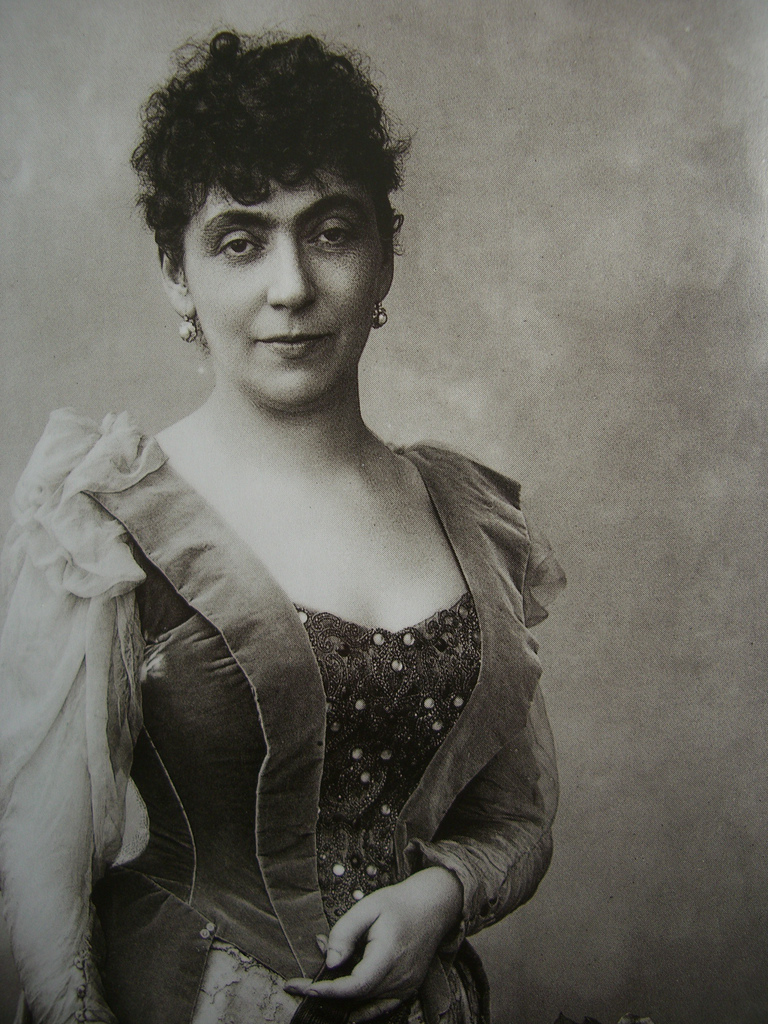
- Detail of the portrait of Madeleine Lemaire by Félix Nadar (1891)
- Born: Madeleine Jeanne Coll; 1845; Les Arcs, Var, France
- Died: April 8, 1928 (aged 82–83); Paris, France
- Known for: Painting
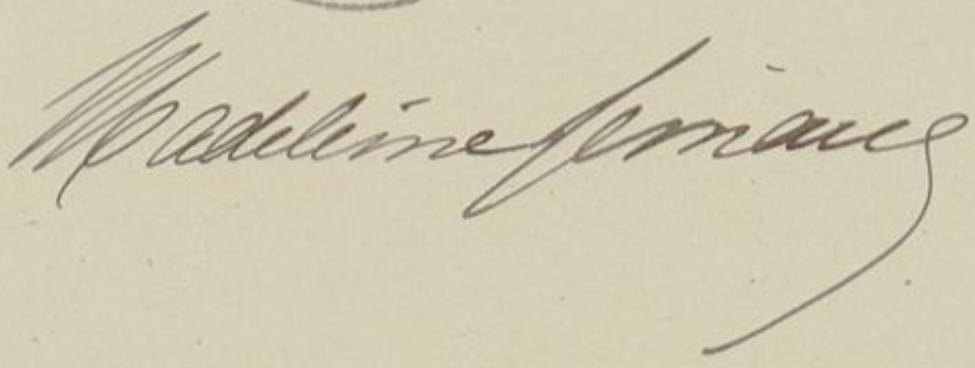

Madeleine Lemaire, née Coll (1845 – 8 April 1928), was a French painter who specialized in elegant genre works and flowers. Robert de Montesquiou said she was The Empress of the Roses. She introduced Marcel Proust and Reynaldo Hahn to the Parisian salons of the aristocracy. She herself held a salon where she received high society in her hôtel particulier on the Rue de Monceau.

Lemaire exhibited her work at the Palace of Fine Arts and The Woman's Building at the 1893 World's Columbian Exposition in Chicago, Illinois.

George Painter stated in his book Marcel Proust that she is one of the models of Proust's Madame Verdurin (In Search of Lost Time). In the preface to Les Plaisirs et les Jours, a book which she illustrated, Proust reports an epigram by Alexander Dumas fils on Lemaire: "She's the one who has created the most roses, after God." [c’est elle qui a créé le plus de roses après Dieu.]

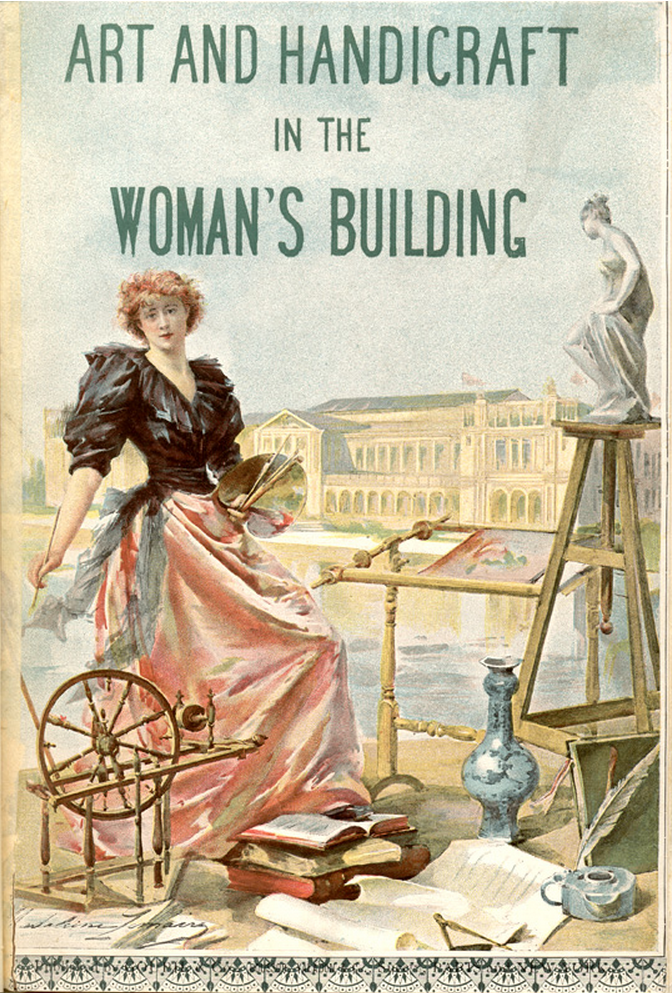
Woman's Building, 1893

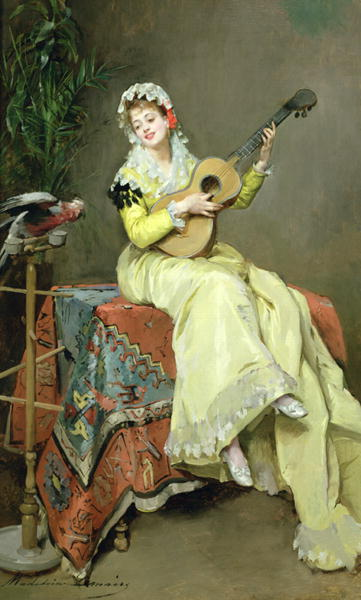
Un Moment Musical

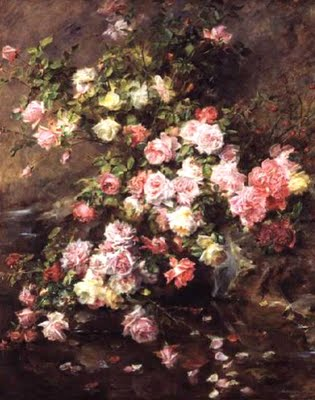
Roses

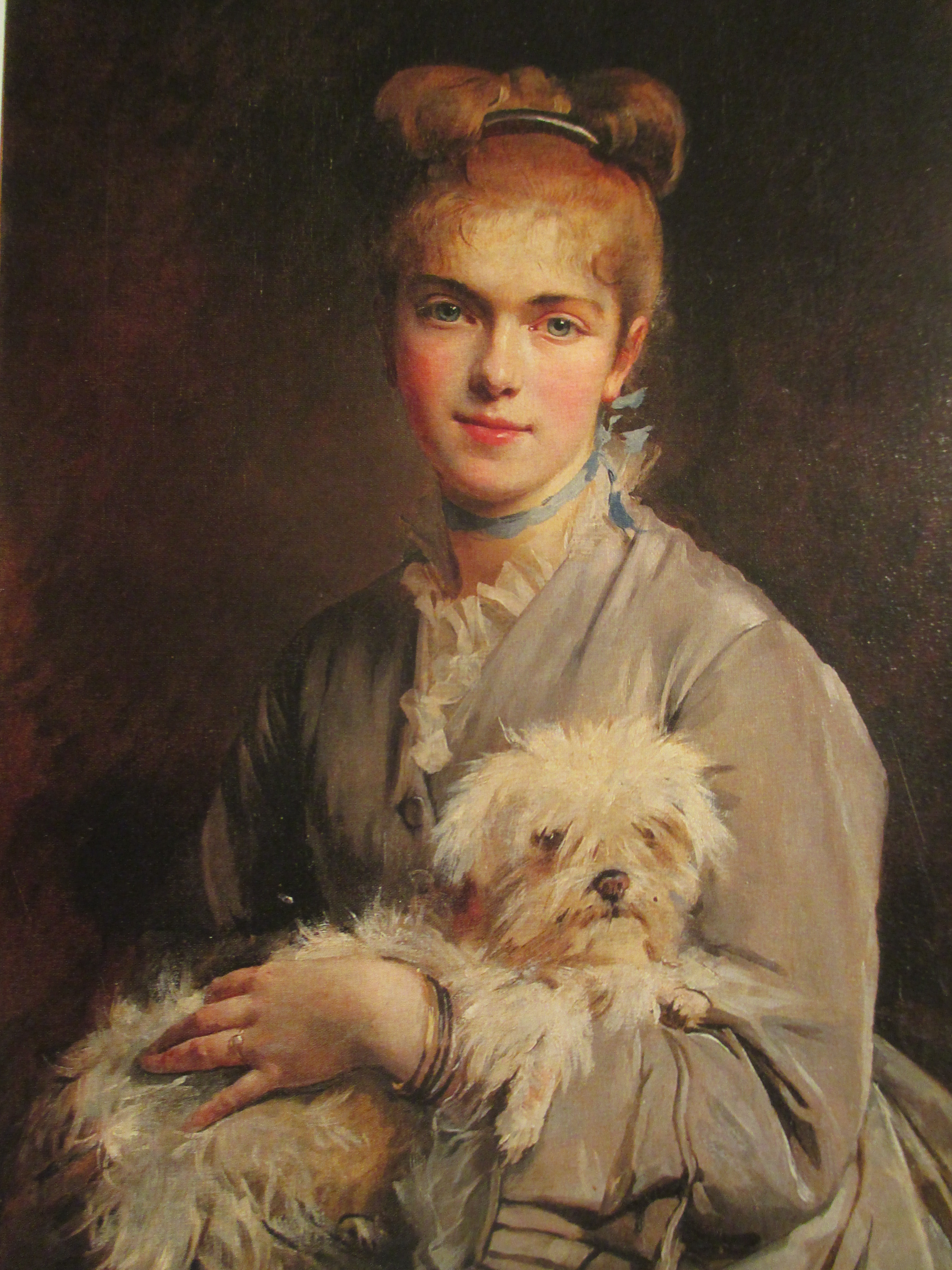
Portrait de Colette Dumas

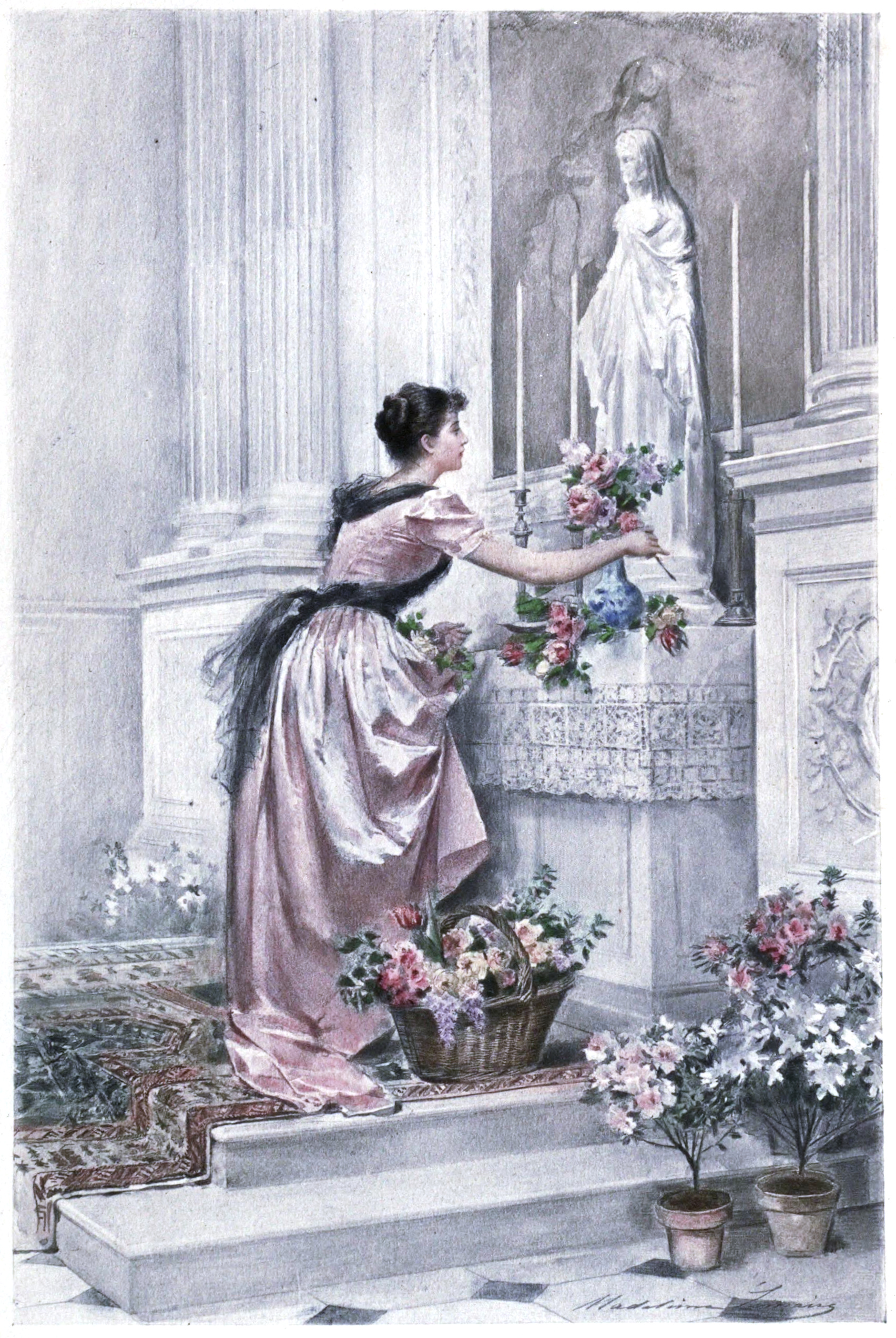
The Month of Mary, 1886

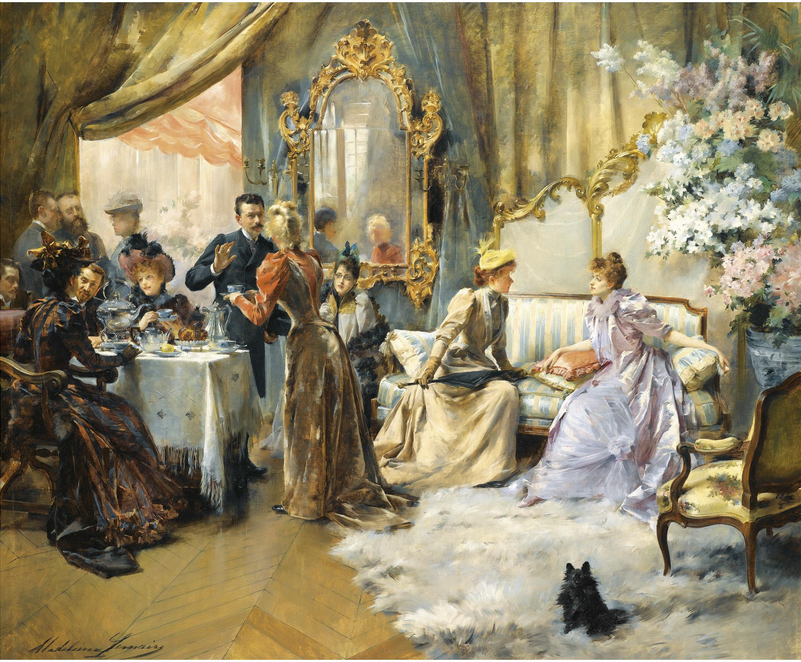
Le Gouter au Salon du Peintre
