= Jacqueline Rose =

British academic (born 1949)

Jacqueline Rose FBA FRSL
- Born: 1949 (age 76–77); London, England
- Relatives: Gillian Rose (sister); Braham Murray (cousin)
- Awards: PEN Pinter Prize (2026)

Academic background
- Education: St Hilda's College, Oxford; Sorbonne, Paris (MA); University College London (PhD)
- Thesis: The Child's Text as Mythology: A Study of Peter Pan (1979)
- Doctoral advisor: Frank Kermode

Academic work
- School or tradition: Lacanianism
- Institutions: University of Sussex (1976–1991); Queen Mary University of London (1992–2015); Birkbeck, University of London (since 2015)
- Main interests: Psychoanalysis, feminism, literature
- Notable works: The Haunting of Sylvia Plath

Jacqueline Rose FBA FRSL (born 1949) is a British academic who is a professor and co-director at the Birkbeck Institute for the Humanities. She is known for her work on the relationship between psychoanalysis, feminism, and literature. In 2026, she was announced as winner of the PEN Pinter Prize, awarded annually by English PEN.

== Early life and education ==
Rose was born and grew up in Hayes in west London with her two sisters. Her elder sister was the philosopher Gillian Rose, and she is a cousin of the theatre director Braham Murray. Her father, a doctor, arrived in the United Kingdom from a prisoner-of-war camp where he had been tortured; he and her mother, who was prevented by her family from attending medical school, divorced when Rose was five. Rose grew up with her stepfather, who was also a doctor, and whose surname she took along with her sister. Approximately fifty members of her mother's family, the Prevezers, had been murdered by the Nazis in the Chełmno extermination camp in central Poland.

Rose graduated from St Hilda's College, Oxford, where she studied English. She gained her master's degree in comparative literature from the Sorbonne, Paris, where she was influenced by Julia Kristeva, became interested in Sigmund Freud, worked at Yves Saint Laurent, and began her doctoral research on children's literature. She received her doctorate in 1979 from the University College London (UCL), where she was supervised by Frank Kermode. She befriended Juliet Mitchell, Laura Mulvey, and Sally Alexander during her PhD years at UCL.

== Career ==
She was a lecturer, then reader in English at the School for Global Studies, (Note: According to an interview with Rose, at the School of Cultural and Community Studies.) University of Sussex, from 1976 to 1991, and taught a women's writing course there in the 1980s. In 1992, she took up an appointment as professor of English at Queen Mary & Westfield College (in 2000 renamed the Queen Mary University of London) and worked there until 2015, when she became a professor of humanities at Birkbeck, University of London.

Rose has been a contributor to the London Review of Books since 1995.

In 2006, Rose was elected a Fellow of the British Academy, and in 2022, a Fellow of the Royal Society of Literature.

As of 2023, she was a co-director of the Birkbeck Institute for the Humanities.

In July 2026, Rose was announced as winner of the PEN Pinter Prize, awarded annually by English PEN, and in October she nominated Palestinian playwright Ali Abu Yassin as "Writer of Courage 2026”.

== Work ==
Rose's book Albertine (2001) is a feminist parallel novel to Marcel Proust's À la recherche du temps perdu.

In 1991, Rose published The Haunting of Sylvia Plath, a critical study of the life and work of American poet Sylvia Plath. The book "tore down the construction of Plath-as-icon, not least through the husbanding of her estate by her widower, Ted Hughes, and his sister, Olwyn." Rose describes the hostility she experienced from both Hughes, including threats received in response to Rose's analysis of Plath's poem "The Rabbit Catcher". The Haunting of Sylvia Plath gained Rose wider attention and was influential in studies of Plath, and itself subject to a critique by Janet Malcolm in her book The Silent Woman: Sylvia Plath and Ted Hughes.

Rose's States of Fantasy (1996) was the inspiration for composer Mohammed Fairouz's Double Concerto of the same name.

She published The Last Resistance in 2008.

She has written about Marcel Proust both in her 2011 non-fiction title, Proust Among the Nations: From Dreyfus to the Middle East, as well as in her only novel, Albertine (2001).

In 2018, Rose published Mothers: An Essay on Love and Cruelty. She also was the judge of the Man Booker Prize in 2018.

=== Criticism of Israel ===
Rose is highly critical of Zionism, describing it in an interview as "[having] been traumatic for the Jews as well as the Palestinians". In the same interview, Rose points to the internal critiques of Zionism expressed by Martin Buber and Ahad Ha'am. She describes her visit to Palestinian refugee camps in Ramallah in the 1980s as having provided her with a political education.

In The Question of Zion (2005), Rose argues that Israel is responsible for "some of the worst cruelties of the modern nation-state". Israeli historian Alexander Yakobson describes this as "moralizing" and disconnected from historical reality. However, Australian academic Dennis Altman describes the book as demonstrating "thorough knowledge of the founders of Israel and their early critics" and complementing this with interviews with contemporary Israelis. Columnist Rafael Behr wrote that her analysis "stands on a solid edifice of scholarship".

She is a supporter of the cultural boycott of Israel. In 2007, she was involved in establishing Independent Jewish Voices.

== Bibliography ==
- Lacan, Jacques (1985) [1982]. Mitchell, Juliet; Rose, Jacqueline (eds.). Feminine Sexuality: Jacques Lacan and the école freudienne. Translated by Jacqueline Rose. New York: W. W. Norton & Company. ISBN 9780393302110 – via Internet Archive.
- — (1993) [1984]. The Case of Peter Pan, or, The Impossibility of Children's Fiction. Philadelphia: University of Pennsylvania Press. ISBN 0812214358.
- — (1986). Sexuality in the Field of Vision. London: Verso. ISBN 0860911489.
- — (1992) [1991]. The Haunting of Sylvia Plath. Cambridge, MA: Harvard University Press. ISBN 0674382250. (new preface 1996)
- —, ed. (1993). Why War? Psychoanalysis, Politics, and the Return to Melanie Klein. Oxford: B. Blackwell. ISBN 9780631189244.
- — (1996). "Feminine Sexuality". In Jackson, Stevi; Scott, Sue (eds.). Feminism and Sexuality: A Reader. New York: Columbia University Press. pp. 74–78. ISBN 9780231107082.
- — (1996). States of Fantasy. The Clarendon Lectures in English Literature. Oxford: Clarendon Press. ISBN 0198182805.
- — (2002) [2001]. Albertine (novel). London: Vintage Books. ISBN 0099286033. (first edn. London: Chatto & Windus, 2001, ISBN 0701169761)
- — (2003). On Not Being Able to Sleep: Psychoanalysis and the Modern World. London: Chatto & Windus. ISBN 9780701169770.
- — (2005). The Question of Zion. Princeton, New Jersey: Princeton University Press. ISBN 9780691130682.
- — (2007). The Last Resistance. London: Verso. ISBN 9781844671243.
- — (2011). Proust Among the Nations: From Dreyfus to the Middle East. Chicago; London: University of Chicago Press. ISBN 9780226725789.
- — (2014). Women in Dark Times. London: Bloomsbury. ISBN 9781408845400.
- — (2018). Mothers: An Essay on Love and Cruelty. London: Faber and Faber. ISBN 9780571331437.
- — (2021). On Violence and on Violence Against Women. London: Faber and Faber. ISBN 9780571332717.
- — (2023). The Plague: Living Death in Our Times. London: Fitzcarraldo Editions. ISBN 9781804270486.
- — (2026). Two Women. Los Angeles: Semiotext(e). ISBN 9781635903133.

== Personal life ==
In the 1990s Rose was in a relationship with the psychoanalyst Adam Phillips, with whom she adopted a daughter, Mia, in 1995; they separated in 2001. In 2012, her partner was the psychoanalyst Jonathan Sklar.

She lives in North London.
