= Robert Proust =

Marcel Proust's brother (1873–1935)

Professor Robert Proust
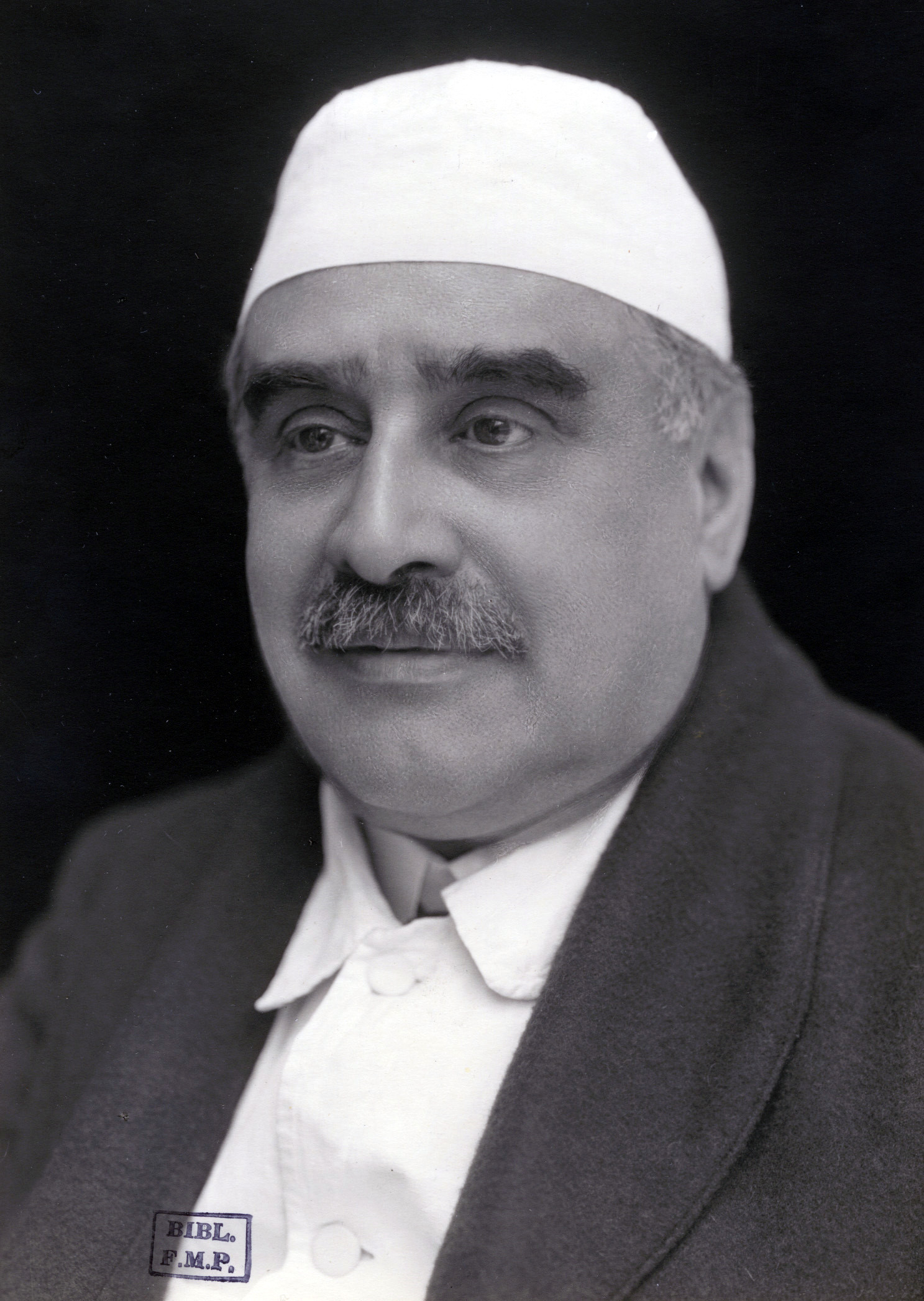
- Born: Robert Emile Sigismond Léon Proust; 24 May 1873; Paris, France
- Died: 29 May 1935 (aged 62); Paris, France
- Education: University of Paris
- Relatives: Adrien Proust (father); Marcel Proust (brother)
- Medical career
- Profession: Surgeon
- Field: Urology; Gynaecology
- Sub-specialties: Prostate surgery

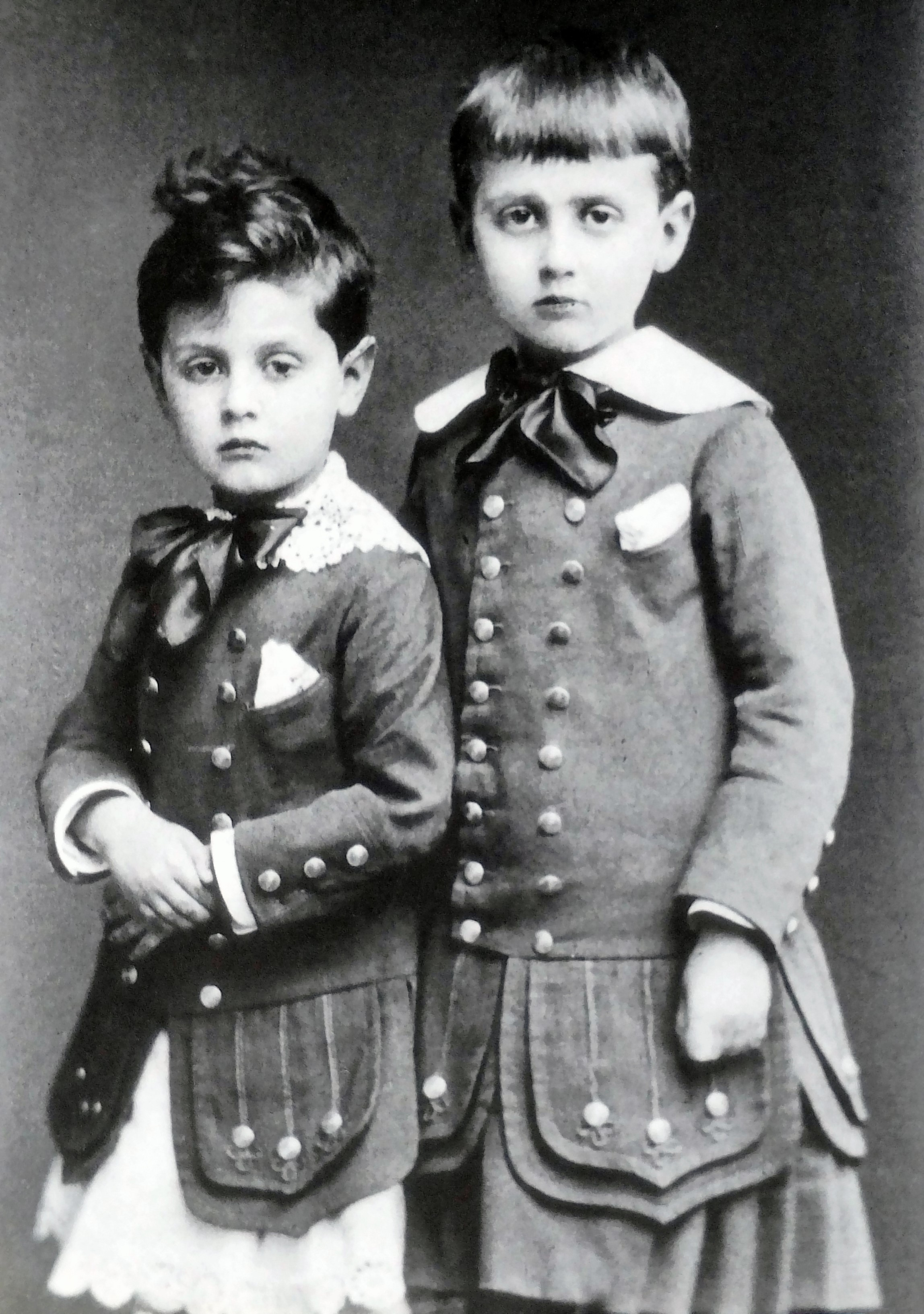
Robert and Marcel Proust. Modeste Chambay, 1877.

Robert Emile Sigismond Léon Proust (24 May 1873 – 29 May 1935) was a French urologist and gynaecologist and the younger brother of the writer Marcel Proust.

Both brothers had an early education at the Lycée Condorcet, with Robert Proust going on to study medicine. An active supporter of his brother's writing career, and following Marcel's early death, he arranged for publication of the final three volumes of Marcel's novel À la recherche du temps perdu.

He published a landmark medical paper on perineal prostatectomy, "De la prostatectomie périnéale totale", following which his colleagues nicknamed his prostate procedure a "proustatectomie". In addition, his interest in gynaecology led to his publication of multiple editions of Chirurgie de l'appareil génital de la femme, a gynaecology textbook.

Amongst other accomplishments, Proust served as a military surgeon during the First World War where he devised a form of mobile operating theatre called the "auto-chir", which could be moved close to the front, and was promoted to Officer of the Legion of Honor in 1925.

Proust died 1935. The Hôpital Tenon in Paris named the "Pavillon Proust" in his honour.

== Early life and family ==
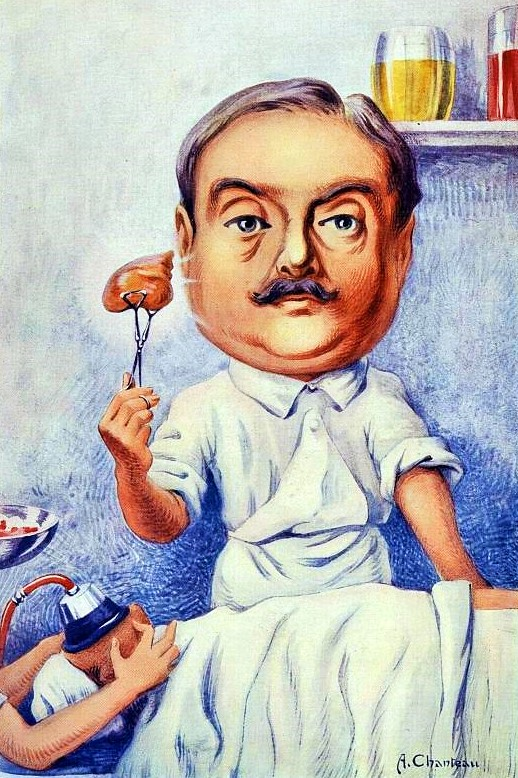
Caricature of Robert Proust. A. Chanteau, 1922.

Robert Proust was born in Paris on 24 May 1873 to Adrien Proust, an eminent physician in the field of public health who helped eliminate cholera from Europe, and his wife Jeanne Weil, a Jewish woman who was fifteen years younger than her husband.

He was educated with his brother Marcel, who was two years older than Robert, at the Lycée Condorcet. He subsequently attended the University of Paris where his performance was considered "outstanding".

== Relationship with his brother ==
Proust and his brother had an affectionate relationship from childhood. When Robert was seven, he saw Marcel's first asthma attack and it had a profound effect upon him. Marcel developed a close attachment to their mother, whereas Robert followed in their father's footsteps in the medical tradition.

Robert was an active supporter of his brother's writing career, and following Marcel's early death, he edited and arranged the final three volumes of his brother's novel À la recherche du temps perdu for publication.

Both brothers were supporters of the unjustly accused French army captain, Alfred Dreyfus.

== Career ==
Proust started his internships in 1894 under the supervision of Félix Guyon, who also oversaw the publication in 1900 of Proust's landmark medical paper on perineal prostatectomy, "De la prostatectomie périnéale totale". Proust's peers nicknamed his prostate procedure a "proustatectomie". A frequent complication to prostatectomy was epididymitis. In 1904, Proust had recommended vasectomy at the time of prostatectomy.

In addition to general surgery and urology, Proust had a special interest in gynaecology and his book Chirurgie de l'appareil génital de la femme (The surgery of the female genital tract) (1904) had six editions by 1927. He studied male (andrology) and female (gynaecology) reproductive tracts, whilst he was Samuel Jean de Pozzi's assistant at Hôpital Broca between 1904 and 1914. He collaborated with Pozzi in his specialism of hermaphrodites and they published a number of articles on the subject together. At the recommendation of Pozzi, Proust made frequent educational journeys to the Mayo Clinic and Johns Hopkins Hospital. Proust was director of the Broca himself from 1932 to 1934. One of his pupils was the future transplant surgeon René Küss.

Proust had a profound interest in the accomplishments of Marie Curie and added a section on "curiethérapie" in the fifth edition of his book, when completing his writings on radiothiotherapy of cervical cancer. Prior to the introduction of external beam radiotherapy, he recommended intravaginal radium rods and intra-abdominal radium applied locally (via laparotomy) to affected lymph nodes.

== First World War ==
Proust served at the front as a military surgeon during the First World War. He devised a form of mobile operating theatre called the "auto-chir", which could be moved close to the front.

== Honours ==
Proust was named Chevalier of the Legion of Honor in 1915 and promoted to Officer of the Legion of Honor in 1925.

== Death and legacy ==
Proust died on 29 May 1935. Paris's Hôpital Tenon has been named the "Pavillon Proust" since 1971.

== Selected publications ==
- "De la prostatectomie périnéale totale". 1900.
- Chirurgie de l'appareil génital de la femme. 1904. (six editions)
