= Adrien Proust =

French epidemiologist and hygienist

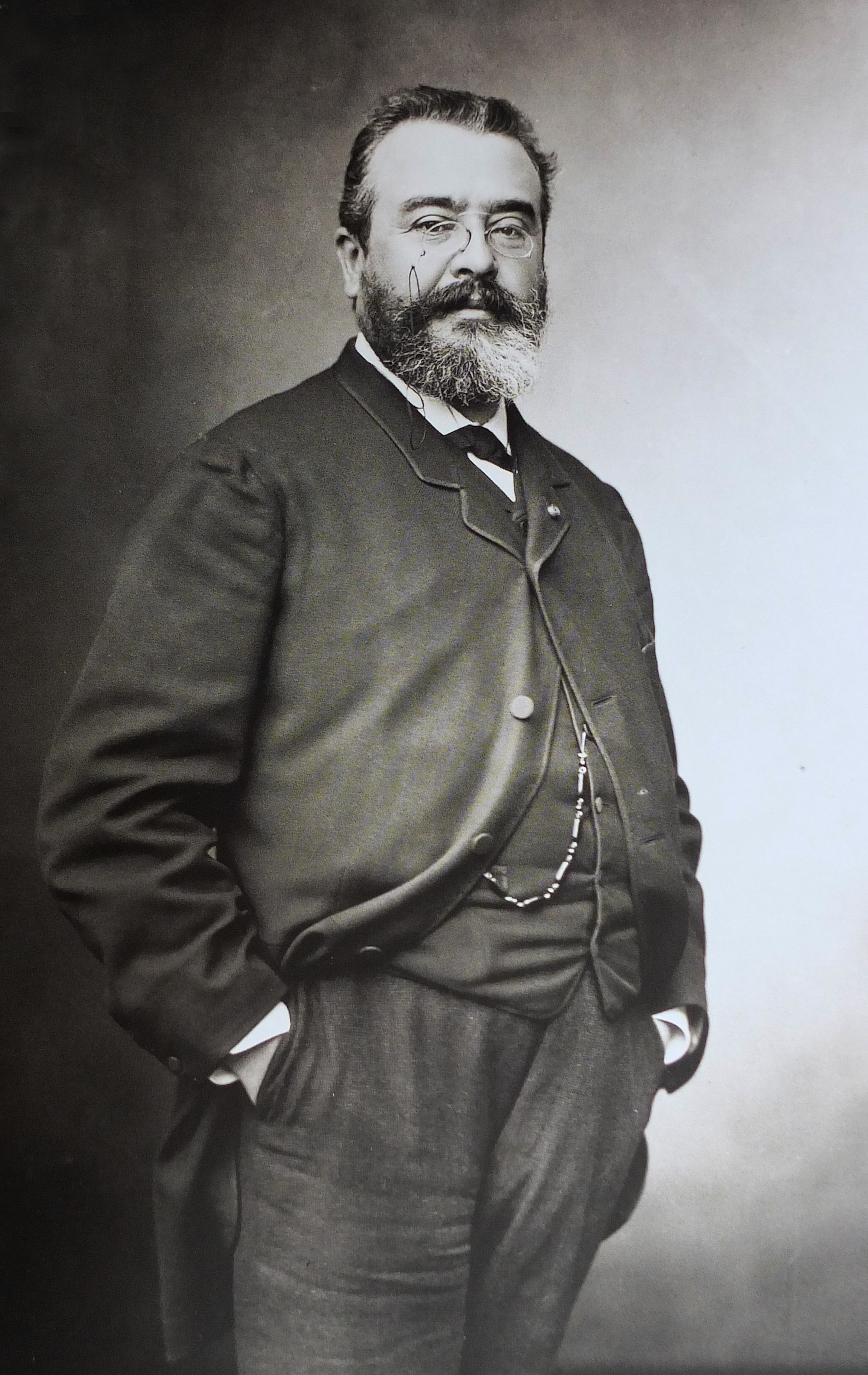
- In 1886
- Born: 18 March 1834; Illiers-Combray, France
- Died: 26 November 1903 (aged 69); Paris, France
- Occupations: Epidemiologist, hygienist
- Children: Marcel Proust; Robert Proust

Adrien Achille Proust (18 March 1834 – 26 November 1903) was a French epidemiologist and hygienist. He was the father of novelist Marcel Proust and doctor Robert Proust. He was a pioneer of public health and sanitary measures in France. He promoted the use of quarantines, sanitary measures, social distancing and cordons to control outbreaks of infectious disease. He was also involved in improving health among the working classes and studied a number of occupational diseases.

== Biography ==
Proust was born in Illiers where his parents were shopkeepers. A brilliant student, he was able to joint the faculty of medicine in Paris where obtained his medical doctorate in 1862. His dissertation was on idopathic pneumothorax. Beginning in 1863 he worked as chef de clinique, and in 1866 earned his agrégation with the thesis Des différentes formes de ramollissement du cerveau (On different forms of softening of the brain). He was a student of Pierre Fauvel. He qualified professeur agrégé to teach at the university and worked as a physician at the Charité Hospital. A cholera outbreak lead to his being assigned for a study. In 1869, he was sent on a mission to Russia and Persia in order to conduct cholera research – a journey in which he also visited Athens, Constantinople, Messina and several locations in Germany. On returning to Paris he married Jeanne-Clémence Weil and they would have two sons, Marcel and Robert.

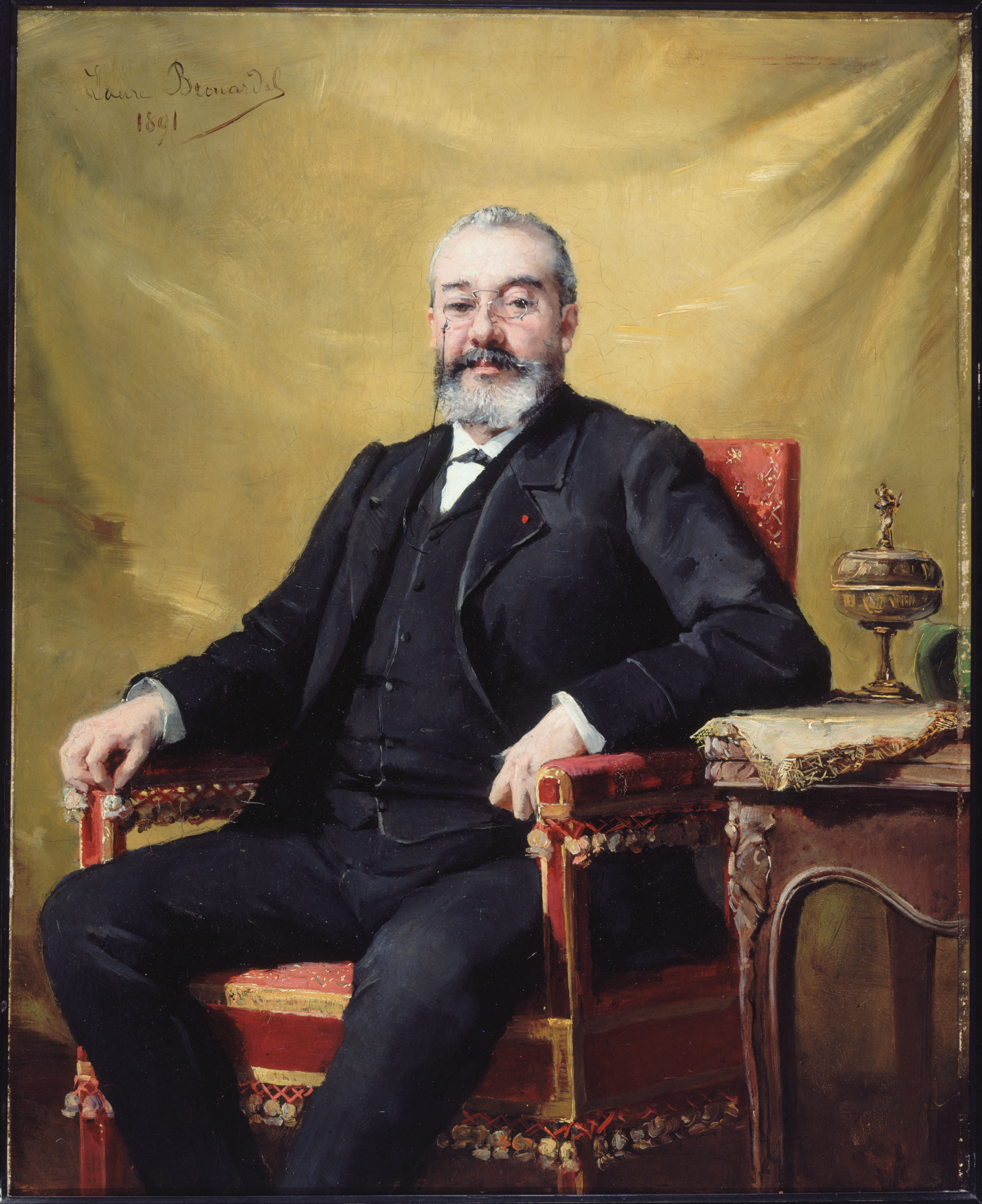
Painting of Proust in 1891 by Laure Brouardel, wife of the dean of the medical faculty Paul Brouardel.

Proust was made inspector general of the sanitary services in 1884 and in 1885 he became a professor of hygiene at the faculty of medicine in Paris, and chief physician at the Hôtel-Dieu de Paris. He was a member of the Comité d'Hygiène publique de France and of the Académie de médecine (from 1879), serving as its secretary from 1883 to 1888.

Proust attended the International Sanitary Conferences from 1892 and was involved in introducing ideas from other countries into France. He also began to examine occupational diseases, looking at respiratory problems among cotton mill workers, miners, lead exposure, slag pneumonia among iron workers and so on. He examined the problems of working women and suggested restrictions on night work and limits to working hours. He also suggested mandatory maternity leave. His ideas were opposed by Léon Say (1826–1896) who stated that hygienists ought to restrict themselves to air, water and microbes and not to social regulations.

In 1888, Adrien Proust, believing like many doctors of his day that masturbation may lead to homosexuality, sent his son Marcel to a brothel with 10 francs. Marcel would relate the awkward experience of what occurred there in a letter to his grandfather.

Proust attended the 11th International Sanitary Conference that was held in Paris. He gave the keynote lecture and sought to introduce several new regulations and the establishment of an international health organization in France based on the outcomes of the discussions held in October 1903. He died the next month from a stroke.The Office International d´Hygiène Publique was established in 1908 and was superseded by the World Health Organization after World War II.

== Legacy ==
Adrien Proust is mentioned in Love in the Time of Cholera, a 1985 novel by Gabriel García Márquez.

== Published works ==
With neurologist Gilbert Ballet he was the author of an important book on neurasthenia, titled L'hygiène du neurasthénique (1900). It was later translated into English and published as "The treatment of neurasthenia" (1903). Among his other written efforts are the following:

- Traité d'hygiène publique et privée, 1877 – Treatise of public and private hygiene.
- La défense de l'Europe contre le choléra, 1892 – Defense of Europe against cholera
- La défense de l'Europe contre la peste, 1897 – Defense of Europe against bubonic plague.
