= Albertine (Rose novel) =

2001 novel by Jacqueline Rose

- Author: Jacqueline Rose
- Genre: Novel
- Publisher: Chatto & Windus
- Publication date: 2001
- Publication place: United Kingdom
- Media type: Print Paperback)

Albertine is the only novel of writer and critic Jacqueline Rose. It is a parallel novel, using characters and events from Marcel Proust's 1913–1927 seven-volume novel In Search of Lost Time.

== Plot summary ==
The beautiful orphan Albertine comes into contact with the austere young Marcel at a Normandy seaside hotel, whilst on holiday with friends. She soon becomes embroiled in a destructive affair with the young man, trapping them both in his Paris apartment. His jealousy and her strong will, and bisexual attraction to others, cause both unhappiness. A gynocentric revisiting of Proust, it is a feminist re-imagining, giving Albertine a voice she has been denied in Proust's books.
