= Les plaisirs et les jours =

Book by Marcel Proust

Pleasures and Days
- First edition
- Author: Marcel Proust
- Original title: Les Plaisirs et les Jours
- Language: French
- Genre: Modernist
- Publisher: Calmann-Lévy
- Publication date: 1896
- Publication place: France

Les Plaisirs et les Jours is a collection of prose poems and novellas by Marcel Proust. It was first published in 1896 by Calmann-Lévy, and was Proust’s first publication.

The critic Léon Blum said of the book: "Nouvelles mondaines, histoires tendres, vers mélodiques, fragments où la précision du trait s'atténue dans la grâce molle de la phrase, M. Proust a réuni tous les genres et tous les charmes. Aussi les belles dames et les jeunes gens liront avec un plaisir ému un si beau livre". ("High society short stories, tender stories, melodic verses, fragments in which the precision of the line is attenuated in the soft grace of the phrase, M. Proust has united all genres and all charms. So the beautiful ladies and the young people will read with such a moved pleasure a beautiful book.")
