= Charles Dubost (surgeon) =

French surgeon

- Born: 1914
- Died: 1991 (aged 76–77)
- Occupation: Surgeon
- Known for: First abdominal aortic aneurysm resection with a homograft replacement

Charles Dubost (October 1914 – 1991) was a French surgeon who performed the first abdominal aortic aneurysm resection with a homograft replacement. Michael DeBakey later performed a similar operation with a prosthesis and named it “Dubost's operation.” He was also the first to perform a carotid endarterectomy under cardiac bypass.

== Early life and education ==
Charles Dubost was born in October 1914 and educated in Paris. He had completed his medical studies before the onset of the Second World War.

== Surgical career ==
Dubost joined Hôpital Broussais after the Second World War and was appointed to cardiac surgery in the blue baby unit in 1947, the same year that Alfred Blalock demonstrated the Taussig-Blalock operation, a procedure Dubost then led in Europe.

In January 1951, Dubost led one of the three surgical teams that performed early kidney transplants in Paris, the others being René Küss and Marceau Servelle. In the same year, he resected an abdominal aortic aneurysm and replaced it with a cadaveric graft that had been preserved by freezing and stored in N. Oeconomous's laboratory.

In 1954, Dubost designed and used a mechanical dilator with two parallel blades which could be passed into the atrium and into the mitral orifice under digital control.

He performed the first carotid endarterectomy under cardiac bypass and later performed one of the early transplants in 1968.

== Awards and honours ==
In 1940, he won the Croix de Guerre as a young medical lieutenant.

He became an officer of the légion d'honneur and was elected to both Académie Nationale de Médecine and the French Academy of Sciences.

== Later life and death ==
Dubost retired in 1982, following which he spent the rest of life reading and listening to classical music. He died at Saint-Michel Hospital in 1991.

== Selected publications ==
- Dubost, C; Allary, M; Oeconomos, N (1952). "Resection of an aneurysm of the abdominal aorta: reestablishment of the continuity by a preserved human arterial graft, with result after five months". AMA Arch Surg. 64 (3): 405–8. doi:10.1001/archsurg.1952.01260010419018. PMID 14894065..
