= Henri Lemoine (fraudster) =

French fraudster

Henri Lemoine (fl. 1905–1908) was a French fraudster who claimed to be able to produce synthetic diamonds.

== Fraud ==
In 1905, Lemoine contacted Sir Julius Wernher, British banker and one of the governors of De Beers Diamond Mines. He said he had discovered a process to produce gem-sized diamonds from coal and agreed to sell his invention if Wernher would be willing to invest to further his research. He invited Wernher to his laboratory in Paris to witness the process. Wernher took Francis Oats, a De Beers executive, and two other associates with him.

Lemoine invited his guests in and left the room; moments later he reappeared naked, to prove that he was not concealing any diamonds in his clothing. He mixed a number of substances including iron filings and coal into a small crucible, showed the mixture to his guests, and placed it into a furnace in the center of the room.

After fifteen minutes, Lemoine removed the hot crucible and let it cool. Then he picked a pair of tweezers and took out about twenty small, well-formed diamonds. Oats examined the diamonds and demanded that Lemoine repeat the procedure. He did so successfully.

Wernher offered to pay Lemoine to develop his invention if he would keep it a secret. Lemoine agreed and promised him an option to buy his secret formula, which he deposited in a London bank deposit box.

For the next three years, Sir Julius sent Lemoine a total of £64,000. Lemoine promised to build a factory to duplicate diamonds; actually he just took a picture of an electric plant in southern France and sent it to Sir Julius.

In 1908, a Persian jeweler revealed that he had sold Lemoine small diamonds that matched the description of the diamonds Lemoine had shown during the first demonstration. Lemoine was indicted for fraud.

In court, Lemoine continued to claim that his process was genuine but was unable to duplicate it for the judges. The secret formula was unsealed by a court order; it was a mixture of powdered carbon and sugar. Before the court could agree on his guilt, Lemoine left the country for parts unknown.

== In Literature ==
"The Lemoine Affair" is a collection of literary pastiches by Marcel Proust, in which he spoofs the writing styles of several fellow French authors. The overall theme is Lemoine, his fraud and its outcome. Proust, himself, lost considerable money on the scheme.
