= Sur la lecture =

"Sur la lecture" ("On Reading") is a text by the French writer Marcel Proust (1871–1922), originally written as a preface to the 1906 French translation of John Ruskin's 1865 essay Sesame and Lilies. In this essay, which foreshadows Proust's novel In Search of Lost Time, Proust discusses his own conception of reading, linking it to childhood memories. He also challenges some of Ruskin's theories.

== Summary ==
Written in 1906 as the preface to the French translation of John Ruskin's Sesame and Lilies, on which Marcel Proust had been working for several years, "On Reading" is an essay in which Proust expresses his own perception of reading, albeit in doing so straying from the subject initially addressed by Ruskin. The exercise leads Proust to recall his earliest memories of reading, in the family drawing room in Illiers, which he describes in meticulous detail and which in retrospect can be understood as a precursor to the first part of his Du côté de chez Swann (itself the first part of In Search of Lost Time), where the young narrator, staying in the imaginary town of Combray, recounts his awestruck discovery of the books of the fictional writer Bergotte.

Beyond these personal descriptions, Proust opposes Ruskin's theories, arguing that reading cannot be considered a conversation, but rather the communication of thought, achieved through the full use of the intellectual resources available to the reader when alone—resources that a genuine conversation with another person cannot provide.

Frequently used as preliminary reading to In Search of Lost Time, and later reprinted independently of John Ruskin's work, "On Reading" is comparable to some of Proust's early works, such as Jean Santeuil (1895) or La fin de la jalousie (1896), in which major aspects of the writer's future great work already appear.

== Editions and translations ==
- Marcel Proust, On Reading, ed. and trans. by Jean Autret and William Burford (Souvenir, 1972). ISBN 0285647083 https://archive.org/details/onreading0000marc/page/n3/mode/2up
