= Céleste (1980 film) =

- Directed by: Percy Adlon
- Written by: Percy Adlon
- Based on: Céleste Albaret's memoir Monsieur Proust
- Produced by: Eleonore Adlon
- Starring: Eva Mattes; Jürgen Arndt; Norbert Wartha; Wolf Euba
- Cinematography: Jürgen Martin
- Edited by: Clara Fabry
- Music by: César Franck, played by the Bartholdy Quartet
- Production companies: pelemele Film; Bayerischer Rundfunk
- Distributed by: Filmverlag der Autoren
- Release date: October 1980
- Running time: 107 minutes
- Country: West Germany
- Language: German

Céleste is a 1980 West German film by Percy Adlon about the life of the French writer Marcel Proust as he lay in his bed from 1912 to 1922; the story is told through the eyes of his real life maid, Céleste Albaret. She waited decades before writing her own book about the experience which was adapted for the screen by Percy Adlon.

Andrew Sarris called the film "one of the most profound tributes one art form has ever paid to another."

== Cast ==
- Eva Mattes as Céleste Albaret
- Jürgen Arndt as Monsieur Proust
- Norbert Wartha as Odilon Albaret
- Wolf Euba as Robert Proust
