= Réveillon, Marne =

Réveillon
- Commune
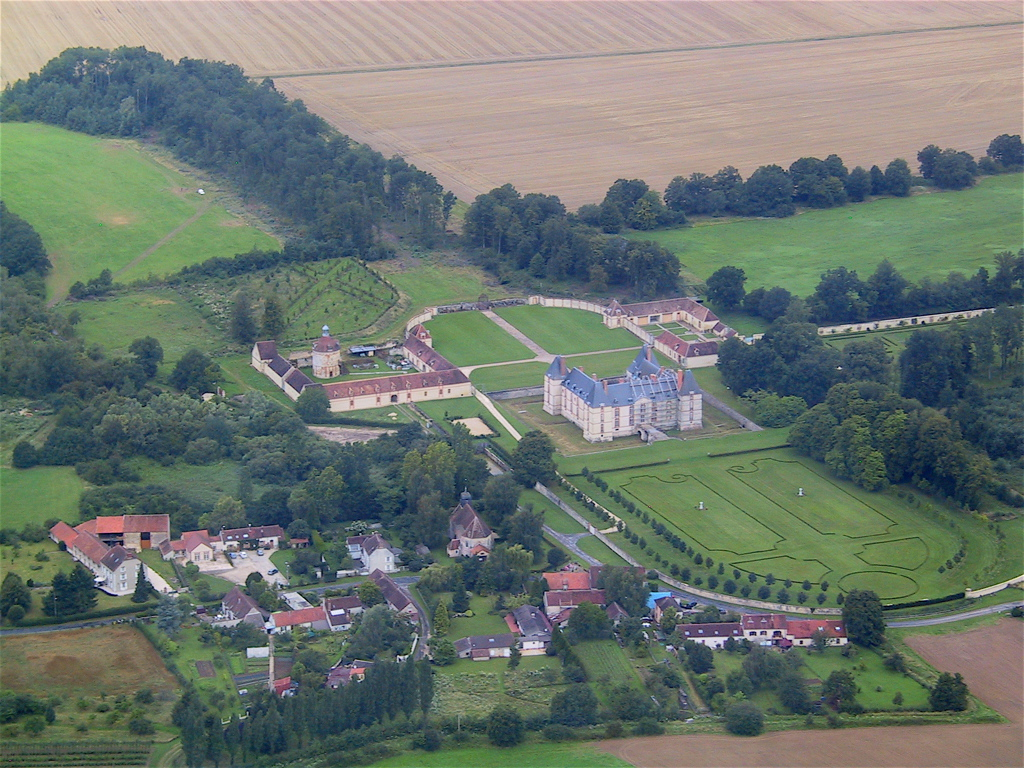
- The chateau in Réveillon

- Coat of arms
- Location of Réveillon
- Location within France Location within Grand Est
- Coordinates: 48°45′10″N 3°27′22″E
- Country: France
- Region: Grand Est
- Department: Marne
- Arrondissement: Épernay
- Canton: Sézanne-Brie et Champagne
- Intercommunality: Sézanne-Sud Ouest Marnais

Government
  - Mayor (2020–2026): Daniel Dubois
- Area^{1}: 6.72 km^{2} (2.59 sq mi)
- Elevation: 190 m (620 ft)
- Population (2023): 109
  - Density: 16.2/km^{2} (42.0/sq mi)
- Time zone: UTC+01:00 (CET)
  - Summer (DST): UTC+02:00 (CEST)
- INSEE/Postal code: 51459 /51310
- ^{1} French Land Register data, which excludes lakes, ponds, glaciers > 1 km^{2} (0.386 sq mi or 247 acres) and river estuaries.

Réveillon (French pronunciation: [ʁevɛjɔ̃]) is a commune in the Marne department in north-eastern France.

== Population ==
Historical population
Year	Pop.	±% p.a.
1968	109	—
1975	91	−2.55%
1982	77	−2.36%
1990	103	+3.70%
1999	106	+0.32%
2007	123	+1.88%
2012	106	−2.93%
2017	106	+0.00%
2023	109	+0.47%
Source: INSEE

== See also ==
- Communes of the Marne department
