= Charles Dubost (lawyer) =

French lawyer

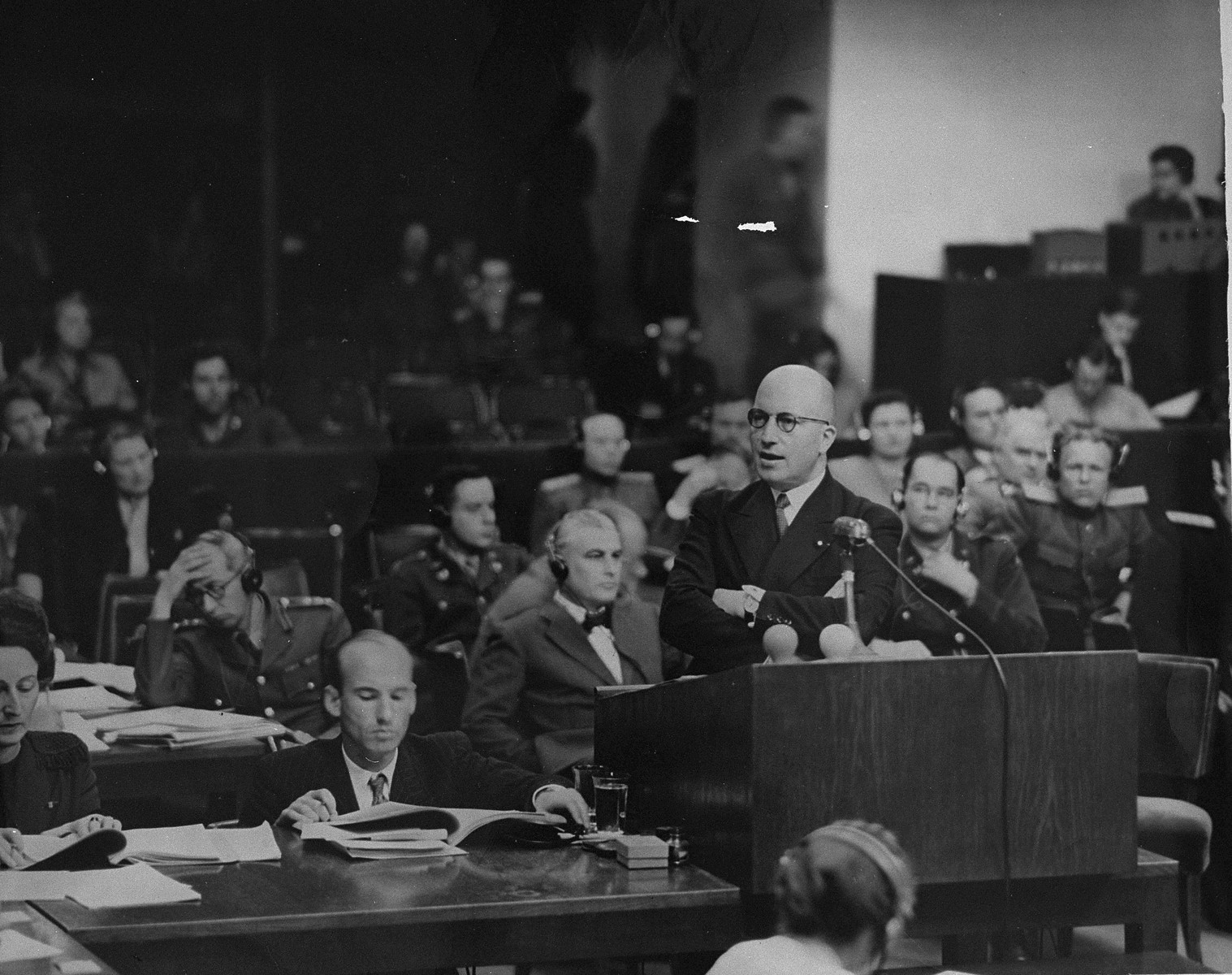
- Born: 1905
- Died: 1991 (aged 85–86)
- Occupation: Lawyer

Charles Dubost (1905–1991) was a French lawyer. He was a prosecutor at the Nuremberg trials.

== Early life ==
Charles Dubost was born in 1905.

== Career ==
Dubost became a lawyer in 1931. He was appointed as a prosecutor in Pontarlier in 1940. While serving as an assistant prosecutor in Toulon in December 1941, he raised the age of consent to 21 for homosexual men, but not for heterosexual couples.

Dubost joined the French resistance shortly after the Germans invaded. After the war, he was a lawyer at the courts in Aix-en-Provence and Marseille.

Dubost was a member of the French delegation to the Nuremberg trials in 1946. For example, he asked a witness if the Germans had known about the concentration camps. He also presented some documents which showed that Hermann Göring had purposely built camps for British prisoners near RAF targets. Moreover, he began research for the prosecution of German businessmen, although the trial was subsequently conducted by United States judges instead.

Dubost worked on prosecutions of collaborationist French businessmen in the late 1940s. He was appointed as assistant to the general prosecutor of the Court of Appeal of Paris in 1955.

== Death ==
Dubost died in 1991.
