= Hôpital Broca =

Hospital in Paris, France

Coordinates: 48.834°N 2.347°E

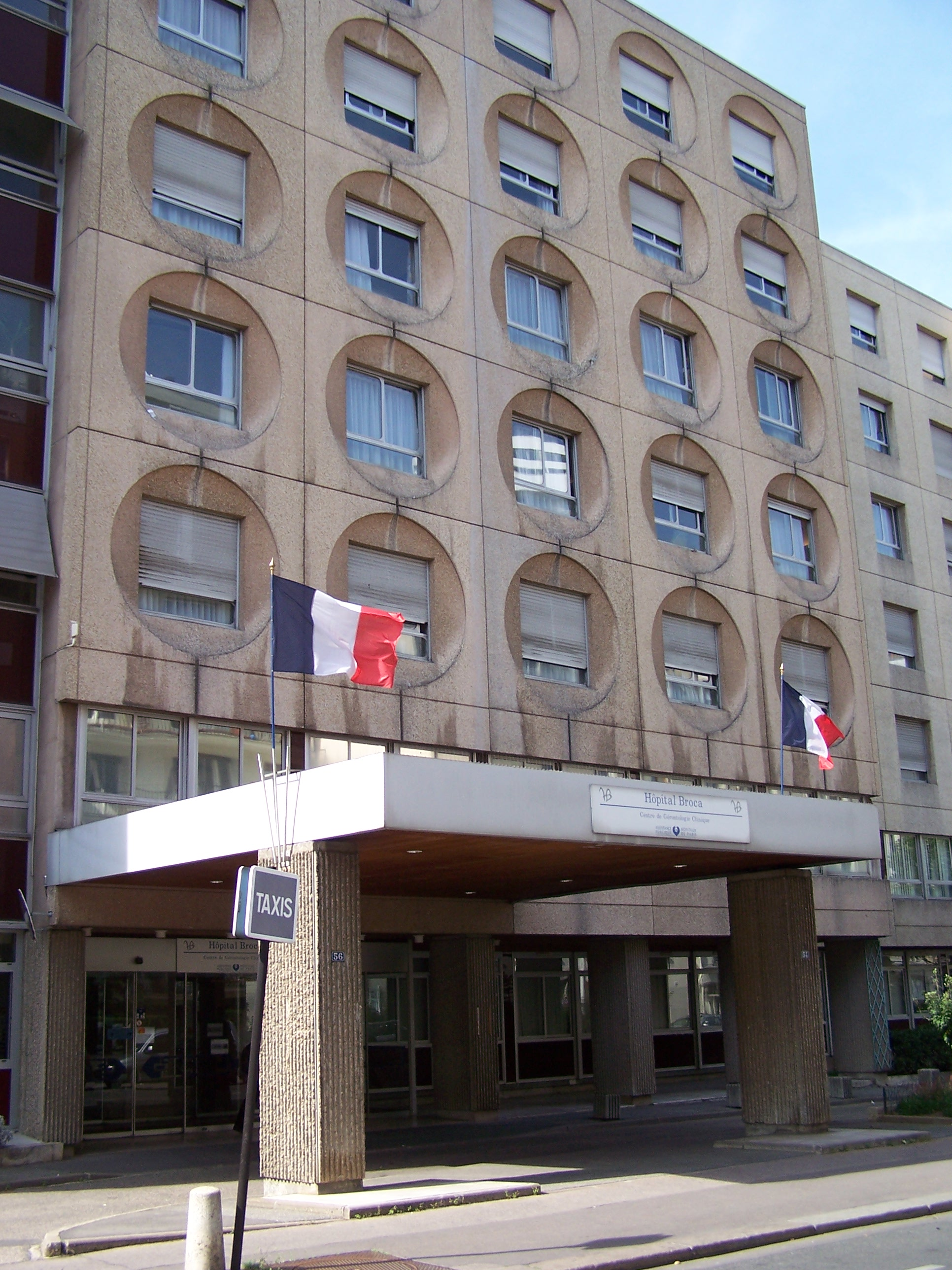
Hôpital Broca

The Hôpital Broca is a hospital of the Public Assistance - Paris Hospitals (AP-HP) located at 54-56 rue Pascal in the 13th arrondissement of Paris, specializing in clinical gerontology.

The hospital is equipped with humanoid robots to make the patients' stay more interactive.
