= Marcel Proust =

French novelist, literary critic, and essayist (1871–1922)

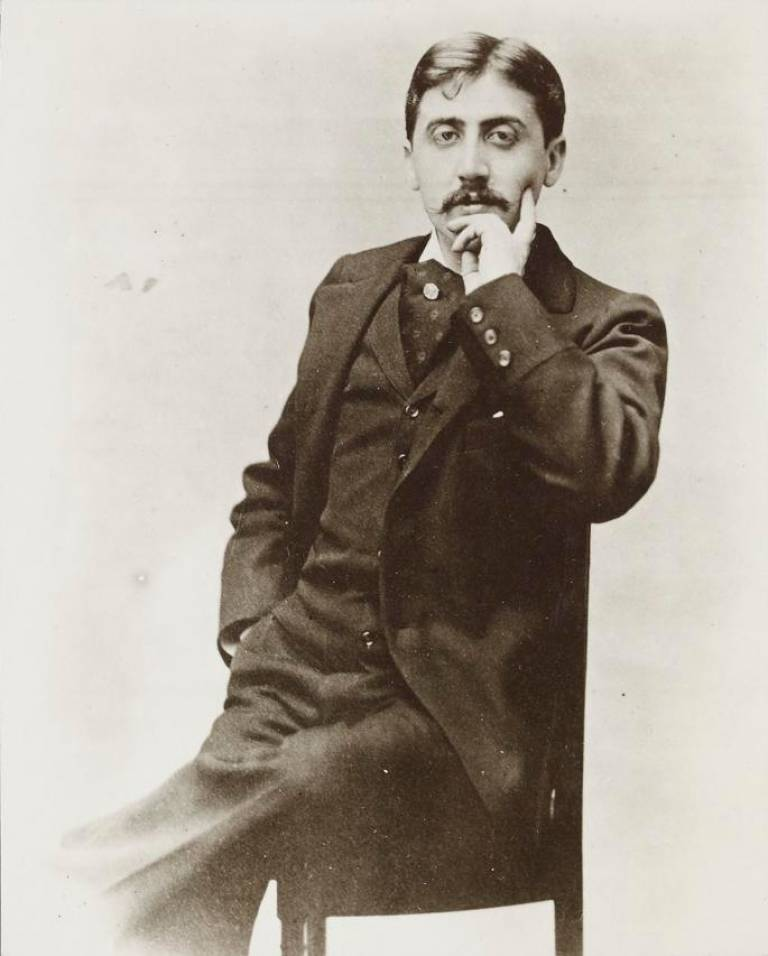
- Proust in 1900
- Born: Valentin Louis Georges Eugène Marcel Proust; 10 July 1871; Paris, France
- Died: 18 November 1922 (aged 51); Paris, France
- Resting place: Père Lachaise Cemetery
- Education: Lycée Condorcet
- Occupations: Novelist; essayist; critic
- Notable work: In Search of Lost Time
- Parent(s): Adrien Achille Proust; Jeanne Clémence Weil
- Relatives: Robert Proust (brother)

Valentin Louis Georges Eugène Marcel Proust (/pruːst/ PROOST; French: [maʁsɛl pʁust]; 10 July 1871 – 18 November 1922) was a French novelist, literary critic, and essayist best known for his novel À la recherche du temps perdu (translated into English as In Search of Lost Time, earlier Remembrance of Things Past), which was published in seven volumes between 1913 and 1927 and totals around 1.25 million words. He is considered by critics and writers to be one of the most influential authors of the twentieth century.

Proust was born in the Auteuil quarter of Paris to a wealthy bourgeois family. His father, Adrien Proust, was a prominent pathologist and epidemiologist who studied cholera. His mother, Jeanne Clémence Weil, was from a prosperous Jewish family. Proust was raised in his father's Catholic faith. From a young age, he struggled with severe asthma attacks which caused him to have a disrupted education. As a young man, Proust cultivated interests in literature and writing while moving in elite Parisian high society salons frequented by aristocrats and the upper bourgeoisie. His sexuality and relationships with men were an open secret among his social circles, though Proust himself never publicly acknowledged being homosexual. These social connections provided inspiration and material for his later novel. His first works, including the collection of stories Les plaisirs et les jours, were published in the 1890s to little public success.

In 1908, Proust began work on À la recherche du temps perdu when he was 38. The novel was partially published in his lifetime, with the initial sections appearing in 1913. The first volume was translated into English by C. K. Scott Moncrieff in 1922 shortly before Proust's death. The remaining volumes were revised and published posthumously by his brother Robert based on Proust's drafts and proofs. La Recherche helped pioneer the stream of consciousness literary technique. The novel's length, complexity and meditation on themes such as desire, artistic creativity, sexuality, and class rendered it a significant work in the development of literary modernism.

Though confined by illness for the last three years of his life, Proust completed advanced drafts of the final parts of La Recherche before his death. He died of pneumonia and pulmonary problems in 1922, aged 51, and was buried in the Père Lachaise Cemetery in Paris.

== Biography ==
Proust was born on 10 July 1871 at the home of his great-uncle in the Paris Borough of Auteuil (the south-western sector of the then-rustic 16th arrondissement), two months after the Treaty of Frankfurt formally ended the Franco-Prussian War. His birth coincided with the beginning of the French Third Republic, during the violence that surrounded the suppression of the Paris Commune, and his childhood corresponded with the consolidation of the Republic. Much of In Search of Lost Time concerns the vast changes, most particularly the decline of the aristocracy and the rise of the middle classes, that occurred in France during the fin de siècle.

Proust's father, Adrien Proust, was a prominent French pathologist and epidemiologist, who studied cholera in Europe and Asia. He wrote numerous articles and books on medicine and hygiene. Proust's mother, Jeanne Clémence (née Weil), was the daughter of a wealthy German–Jewish family from Alsace. Literate and well-read, she demonstrated a well-developed sense of humour in her letters, and her command of the English language was sufficient to help with her son's translations of John Ruskin. Proust was raised in his father's Catholic faith. He was baptized on 5 August 1871 at the Church of Saint-Louis-d'Antin and later confirmed as a Catholic, but he never formally practised that faith. He later became an atheist and was something of a mystic.

By the age of nine, Proust had had his first serious asthma attack, and thereafter was considered a sickly child. Proust spent long holidays in the village of Illiers. This village, combined with recollections of his great-uncle's house in Auteuil, became the model for the fictional town of Combray, where some of the most important scenes of In Search of Lost Time take place. (Illiers was renamed Illiers-Combray in 1971 on the occasion of the Proust centenary celebrations.)

In 1882, at the age of eleven, Proust became a pupil at the Lycée Condorcet; however, his education was disrupted by his illness. Despite this, he excelled in literature, receiving an award in his final year. Thanks to his classmates, he was able to gain access to some of the salons of the upper bourgeoisie, providing him with copious material for In Search of Lost Time.

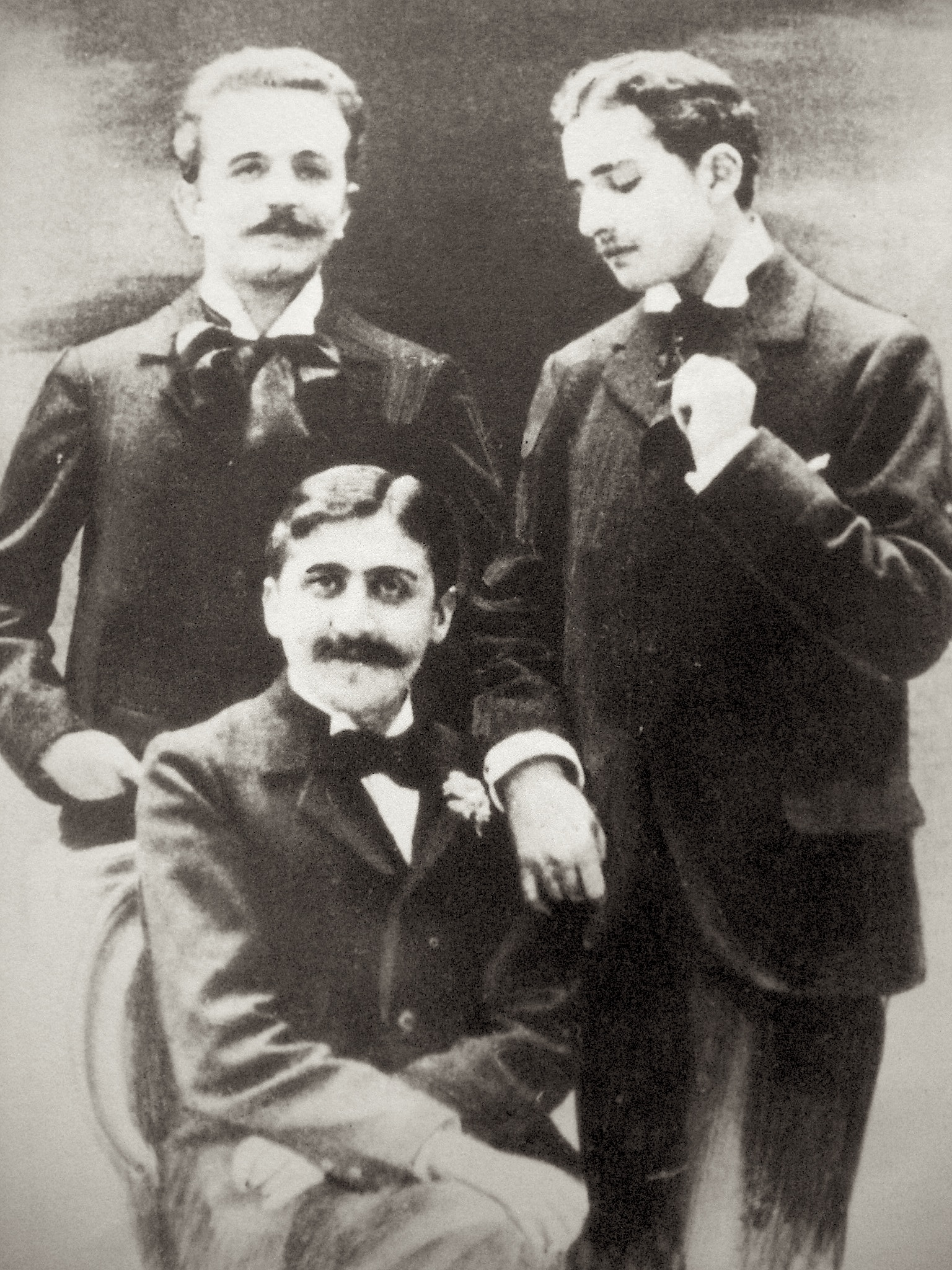
Marcel Proust (seated), Robert de Flers (left), and Lucien Daudet (right), c. 1894

In spite of his poor health, Proust served a year (1889–90) in the French army, stationed at Coligny Barracks in Orléans, an experience that provided a lengthy episode in The Guermantes' Way, part three of his novel. As a young man, Proust was a dilettante and a social climber whose aspirations as a writer were hampered by his lack of self-discipline. His reputation from this period, as a snob and an amateur, contributed to his later troubles with getting Swann's Way, the first part of his large-scale novel, published in 1913. At this time, he attended the salons of Mme Straus, widow of Georges Bizet and mother of Proust's childhood friend Jacques Bizet, of Madeleine Lemaire and of Mme Arman de Caillavet, one of the models for Madame Verdurin, and mother of his friend Gaston Arman de Caillavet, with whose fiancée (Jeanne Pouquet) he was in love. It is through Mme Arman de Caillavet, he made the acquaintance of Anatole France, her lover.

Proust had a close relationship with his mother. To appease his father, who insisted that he pursue a career, Proust obtained a volunteer position at Bibliothèque Mazarine in the summer of 1896. After exerting considerable effort, he obtained a sick leave that extended for several years until he was considered to have resigned. He never worked at his job, and he did not move from his parents' apartment until after both were dead.

His life and family circle changed markedly between 1900 and 1905. In February 1903, Proust's brother, Robert Proust, married and left the family home. His father died in November of the same year. Finally, and most crushingly, Proust's beloved mother died in September 1905. She left him a considerable inheritance. His health throughout this period continued to deteriorate.

Proust spent the last three years of his life mostly confined to his bedroom of his apartment 44 rue Hamelin (in Chaillot), sleeping during the day and working at night to complete his novel. He died of pneumonia and a pulmonary abscess in 1922. Man Ray photographed Proust on his deathbed. He was buried in the Père Lachaise Cemetery in Paris.

=== Personal life ===
Proust is known to have been homosexual; his sexuality and relationships with men are often discussed by his biographers. Although his housekeeper, Céleste Albaret, denies this aspect of Proust's sexuality in her memoirs, her denial runs contrary to the statements of many of Proust's friends and contemporaries, including his fellow writer André Gide as well as his valet Ernest A. Forssgren.

Proust never openly disclosed his homosexuality, though his family and close friends either knew or suspected it. In 1897, he fought a duel with writer Jean Lorrain, who publicly questioned the nature of Proust's relationship with his lover Lucien Daudet; both duellists survived. Despite Proust's public denials, his romantic relationship with composer Reynaldo Hahn and his infatuation with his chauffeur and secretary, Alfred Agostinelli, are well-documented. On the night of 11 January 1918, Proust was one of the men identified by police in a raid on a male brothel run by Albert Le Cuziat. Proust's friend Paul Morand openly teased Proust about his visits to male prostitutes. In his journal, Morand refers to Proust, as well as Gide, as "constantly hunting, never satiated by their adventures ... eternal prowlers, tireless sexual adventurers."

The exact influence of Proust's sexuality on his writing is a topic of debate. However, In Search of Lost Time discusses homosexuality at length and features several principal characters, both men and women, who are either homosexual or bisexual: the Baron de Charlus, Robert de Saint-Loup, Odette de Crécy, and Albertine Simonet. Homosexuality also appears as a theme in Les plaisirs et les jours and his unfinished novel, Jean Santeuil.

Proust inherited much of his mother's political outlook, which was supportive of the French Third Republic and near the liberal centre of French politics. In an 1892 article published in Le Banquet entitled "L'Irréligion d'État", Proust condemned extreme anti-clerical measures such as the expulsion of monks, observing that "one might just be surprised that the negation of religion should bring in its wake the same fanaticism, intolerance, and persecution as religion itself." He argued that socialism posed a greater threat to society than the Church. He was equally critical of the right, lambasting "the insanity of the conservatives," whom he deemed "as dumb and ungrateful as under Charles X," and referring to Pope Pius X's obstinacy as foolish. Proust always rejected the bigoted and illiberal views harbored by many priests at the time, but believed that the most enlightened clerics could be just as progressive as the most enlightened secularists, and that both could serve the cause of "the advanced liberal Republic". He approved of the more moderate stance taken in 1906 by Aristide Briand, whom he described as "admirable".

Proust was among the earliest Dreyfusards, even attending Émile Zola's trial and proudly claiming to have been the one who asked Anatole France to sign the petition in support of Alfred Dreyfus's innocence. In 1919, when representatives of the right-wing Action Française published a manifesto upholding French colonialism and the Catholic Church as the embodiment of civilised values, Proust rejected their nationalistic and chauvinistic views in favor of a liberal pluralist vision which acknowledged Christianity's cultural legacy in France. Julien Benda commended Proust in La Trahison des clercs as a writer who distinguished himself from his generation by avoiding the twin traps of nationalism and class sectarianism.

Because of his allergies and frequent asthma attacks, and the misunderstanding of the disease at the time, Proust was considered a hypochondriac by his doctors. His correspondence provides some clues on his symptoms. According to Yellowlees Douglas, Proust suffered from the vascular subtype of Ehlers–Danlos Syndrome.

== Early writing ==
Proust was involved in writing and publishing from an early age. In addition to the literary magazines with which he was associated, and in which he published while at school (La Revue verte and La Revue lilas), from 1890 to 1891 he published a regular society column in the journal Le Mensuel. In 1892, he was involved in founding a literary review called Le Banquet (also the French title of Plato's Symposium), and throughout the next several years Proust published small pieces regularly in this journal and in the prestigious La Revue Blanche.

In 1896 Les plaisirs et les jours, a compendium of many of these early pieces, was published. The book included a foreword by Anatole France, drawings by Mme Lemaire in whose salon Proust was a frequent guest, and who inspired Proust's Mme Verdurin. She invited him and Hahn to her château de Réveillon (the model for Mme Verdurin's La Raspelière) in summer 1894, and for three weeks in 1895. Despite the contents being well received, the book sold poorly due to its high price, which was widely ridiculed. The price was due to the fact that the book was so sumptuously produced.

That year Proust also began working on a novel, which was eventually published in 1952 and titled Jean Santeuil by his posthumous editors. Many of the themes later developed in In Search of Lost Time find their first articulation in this unfinished work, including the enigma of memory and the necessity of reflection; several sections of In Search of Lost Time can be read in the first draft in Jean Santeuil. The portrait of the parents in Jean Santeuil is quite harsh, in marked contrast to the adoration with which the parents are painted in Proust's masterpiece. Following the poor reception of Les Plaisirs et les Jours, and internal troubles with resolving the plot, Proust gradually abandoned Jean Santeuil in 1897 and stopped work on it entirely by 1899.

Beginning in 1895 Proust spent several years reading Thomas Carlyle, Ralph Waldo Emerson, and John Ruskin. Through this reading, he refined his theories of art and the role of the artist in society. Also, in Time Regained Proust's universal protagonist recalls having translated Ruskin's Sesame and Lilies. The artist's responsibility is to confront the appearance of nature, deduce its essence and retell or explain that essence in the work of art. Ruskin's view of artistic production was central to this conception, and Ruskin's work was so important to Proust that he claimed to know "by heart" several of Ruskin's books, including The Seven Lamps of Architecture, The Bible of Amiens, and Praeterita.

Proust set out to translate two of Ruskin's works into French, but was hampered by an imperfect command of English. To compensate for this he made his translations a group affair: sketched out by his mother, the drafts were first revised by Proust, then by Marie Nordlinger, the English cousin of his friend and sometime lover Hahn, then finally polished by Proust. Questioned about his method by an editor, Proust responded, "I don't claim to know English; I claim to know Ruskin". The Bible of Amiens, with Proust's extended introduction, was published in French in 1904. Both the translation and the introduction were well-reviewed; Henri Bergson called Proust's introduction "an important contribution to the psychology of Ruskin", and had similar praise for the translation. At the time of this publication, Proust was already translating Ruskin's Sesame and Lilies, which he completed in June 1905, just before his mother's death, and published in 1906. Proust wrote a long preface to the translation, "On Reading", which itself became a noted work. Literary historians and critics have ascertained that, apart from Ruskin, Proust's chief literary influences included Balzac, Saint-Simon, Montaigne, Stendhal, Flaubert, George Eliot, Fyodor Dostoyevsky, and Leo Tolstoy.

In Proust’s 1904 article "La mort des cathédrales" (The Death of Cathedrals) published in Le Figaro, Proust called Gothic cathedrals "probably the highest, and unquestionably the most original expression of French genius".

1908 was an important year for Proust's development as a writer. During the first part of the year he published in various journals pastiches of other writers. These exercises in imitation may have allowed Proust to solidify his own style. In addition, in the spring and summer of the year Proust began work on several essays in imitation of various styles that would later collect under the title Pastiches et mélanges. The subject of these pieces was Henri Lemoine, a fraudster who had convinced several members of high society, including the diamond magnate Julius Wernher and Proust himself, that he had discovered the secret of creating diamonds. Proust also began to write a more ambitious book of essays, later published as Contre Sainte-Beuve. Proust described his efforts in a letter to a friend: "I have in progress: a study on the nobility, a Parisian novel, an essay on Sainte-Beuve and Flaubert, an essay on women, an essay on pederasty (not easy to publish), a study on stained-glass windows, a study on tombstones, a study on the novel".

From these disparate fragments Proust began to shape a novel on which he worked continually during this period. The rough outline of the work centred on a first-person narrator, unable to sleep, who during the night remembers waiting as a child for his mother to come to him in the morning. The novel was to have ended with a critical examination of Sainte-Beuve and a refutation of his theory that biography was the most important tool for understanding an artist's work. Present in the unfinished manuscript notebooks are many elements that correspond to parts of the Recherche, in particular, to the "Combray" and "Swann in Love" sections of Volume 1, and to the final section of Volume 7. Trouble with finding a publisher, as well as a gradually changing conception of his novel, led Proust to shift work to a substantially different project that still contained many of the same themes and elements. By 1910 he was at work on À la recherche du temps perdu.

== In Search of Lost Time ==
Begun in 1909, when Proust was 38 years old, À la recherche du temps perdu consists of seven volumes totaling around 3,200 pages (about 4,300 in The Modern Library's translation). Graham Greene called Proust the "greatest novelist of the twentieth century, just as Tolstoy was of the nineteenth" and W. Somerset Maugham called the novel the "greatest fiction to date". André Gide was initially not so taken with his work. The first volume was refused by the publisher Gallimard on Gide's advice. He later wrote to Proust apologizing for his part in the refusal and calling it one of the most serious mistakes of his life. Finally, the book was published at the author's expense by Grasset and Proust paid critics to speak favorably about it.

Proust died before he was able to complete his revision of the drafts and proofs of the final volumes, the last three of which were published posthumously and edited by his brother Robert. The book was translated into English by C. K. Scott Moncrieff, appearing under the title Remembrance of Things Past between 1922 and 1931. Scott Moncrieff translated volumes one through six of the seven volumes, dying before completing the last. This last volume was rendered by other translators at different times. When Scott Moncrieff's translation was later revised (first by Terence Kilmartin, then by D. J. Enright) the title of the novel was changed to the more literal In Search of Lost Time.

== Bibliography ==
=== Novels ===
- In Search of Lost Time (À la recherche du temps perdu published in seven volumes, previously translated as Remembrance of Things Past) (1913–1927)
1. Swann's Way (Du côté de chez Swann, sometimes translated as The Way by Swann's) (1913)
2. In the Shadow of Young Girls in Flower (À l'ombre des jeunes filles en fleurs, also translated as Within a Budding Grove) (1919)
3. The Guermantes Way (Le Côté de Guermantes originally published in two volumes) (1920–1921)
4. Sodom and Gomorrah (Sodome et Gomorrhe originally published in two volumes, sometimes translated as Cities of the Plain) (1921–1922)
5. The Prisoner (La Prisonnière, also translated as The Captive) (1923)
6. The Fugitive (Albertine disparue, also titled La Fugitive, sometimes translated as The Sweet Cheat Gone or Albertine Gone) (1925)
7. Time Regained (Le Temps retrouvé, also translated as Finding Time Again and The Past Recaptured) (1927)
- Jean Santeuil (1896–1900, unfinished novel in three volumes published posthumously – 1952)

=== Short story collections ===
- Early Stories (short stories published posthumously)
- Pleasures and Days (Les plaisirs et les jours; illustrations by Madeleine Lemaire, preface by Anatole France, and four piano works by Reynaldo Hahn) (1896)

=== Non-fiction ===
- Pastiches, or The Lemoine Affair (Pastiches et mélanges – a collection) (1919)
- Against Sainte-Beuve (Contre Sainte-Beuve: suivi de Nouveaux mélanges) (published posthumously 1954)

=== Translations of John Ruskin ===
- La Bible d'Amiens (translation of The Bible of Amiens) (1896)
- Sésame et les lys: des trésors des rois, des jardins des reines (translation of Sesame and Lilies) (1906)

== See also ==
- 102 Boulevard Haussmann, a BBC production set in 1916 about Proust
- Albertine, a novel based on a character in À la recherche du temps perdu by Jacqueline Rose (London, 2001)
- Céleste, a German film dramatising part of Proust's life, seen from the viewpoint of his housekeeper Céleste Albaret
- Involuntary memory
- Le Temps Retrouvé, d'après l'œuvre de Marcel Proust (Time Regained), film by director Raúl Ruiz, 1999
- Proust, an essay by Samuel Beckett
- Proust Questionnaire
- Swann in Love, film by the director Volker Schlöndorff, 1984
- La captive, film by the director Chantal Akerman, 2000
