= Primrose International Viola Competition =

The Primrose International Viola Competition (PIVC), also referred to as the Primrose Memorial Scholarship Competition (PMSC), is an international music competition for viola players sponsored by the American Viola Society and named for the 20th-century virtuoso William Primrose.

The 18th Primrose International Viola Competition will be held October 28–31, 2027 at the Colburn School in Los Angeles.

== History ==
International music competitions for instruments such as violin and piano had been held for decades. However, there was a void in the music world to recognize the viola as a major solo instrument. Because of a lack of substantial viola solo literature, the instrument's potential was not realized until the appearance of Lionel Tertis, considered the "father of viola playing". William Primrose continued in Tertis' footsteps of excellence in viola performance, catapulting the instrument on to the international stage. The Primrose International Viola Competition was created in 1979 as the first competition solely for the instrument. In subsequent years other major viola competitions arose: the Lionel Tertis International Viola Competition, the now defunct Maurice Vieux International Viola Competition and, most recently, the Tokyo International Viola Competition.

The Primrose International Viola Competition has been held regularly since 1986, often in conjunction with biennial meetings of the North American Viola Congress. The competition currently makes its home in Los Angeles, California at the Colburn School. Eligible participants are 29 years and younger of any nationality. The competition involves three rounds during a week-long festival in which entrants perform a required work as well as several choices from a viola repertoire list that includes solo works, sonatas, concertos and transcriptions by Primrose.

== PIVC / PMSC laureates ==
PIVC No.	PMSC No.	Year	Location	1st Prize	2nd Prize	3rd Prize	Notes / Jurists
18		2027	Colburn School; Los Angeles, California				Jury:
17		2024	Colburn School; Los Angeles, California	(Canada) Emad Zolfaghari	(Poland) Kinga Wojdalska	(United States) Andy Park	Jury: Ayane Kozasa (Chairman), Atar Arad, Cathy Basrak, Ensik Choi, Steven Dann, Geraldine Walther
16		2021	Colburn School; Los Angeles, California	(United States) Natalie Loughran	(United States) Samuel Rosenthal	(Denmark) / (United States) Nicholas Swensen	Jury: Barry Shiffman (Chairman), Andrés Cárdenes, Victoria Chiang, Daniel Heifetz, Mai Motobuchi, Dimitri Murrath, Chauncey Patterson
15		2018	Colburn School; Los Angeles, California	(South Korea) Hae-Sue Lee	(United States) Zoë Martin-Doike	(United Kingdom) Leonid Plashinov-Johnson	Jury: Lars Anders Tomter (Chairman), Roland Glassl, Kazuhide Isomura, Nokuthula Ngwenyama, Xidi Shen, Jon Nakamatsu
14		2014	Colburn School; Los Angeles, California	(China) Zhanbo Zheng	(France) Manuel Vioque-Judde	(China) Cong Wu	Jury: Cathy Basrak, Martin Beaver, Claudine Bigelow, Caroline Coade, Wing Ho, Luis Magín, Massimo Paris, Cassandra Lynne Richburg, Pierre-Henri Xuereb; Honorable Mention: (Hong Kong) Born Lau, (Japan) Kei Tojo
13		2011	Robertson & Sons Violins; University of New Mexico; Albuquerque, New Mexico	(United States) Ayane Kozasa	(United States) / (Norway) Elias Goldstein	(United States) Vicki Powell	Jury: Che-Yen Chen, Kirsten Docter, Wing Ho, Luis Magín, Karen Ritscher, Yizhak Schotten, Barbara Westphal, Juliet White-Smith, Karin Brown; Honorable Mention: (South Korea) Da Kyung Kwak, (United States) Matthew Lipman
12	(11)	2008	Arizona State University; Tempe, Arizona	(Belgium) Dimitri Murrath	(United States) Emily Deans	(United States) Molly Carr	Held in conjunction with the 36th International Viola Congress. Jury: Claudine Bigelow (Chairman), Ensik Choi, Bruno Pasquier, Carol Rodland, Eugene Sârbu, Amir Shiff, Steven Tenenbom
	10	2005	Brigham Young University; Provo, Utah	(United States) Jennifer Stumm	(United States) David Aaron Carpenter (United States) David Kim	— not awarded —	Jury: Matthew Dane (Chairman), Carol Rodland, Daniel Foster, Susan Dubois, Nokuthula Ngwenyama; Honorable Mention: (China) Yu Jin
	9	2003	Samford University; Homewood, Alabama	(Taiwan) Che-Yen (Brian) Chen	(China) Teng Li	(Germany) Nils Mönkemeyer	Jury: Helen Callus (Chairman), Barbara Hamilton, Michael Palumbo, Kathryn Steely, Dwight Pounds; Honorable Mention: (United States) Amalia Aubert, (United States) Abigail Evans
	8	2001	Elmhurst College; Elmhurst, Illinois	(France) Antoine Tamestit	(Lithuania) Ula Žebriūnaitė	— not awarded —	Jury: Ralph Fielding, Jerzy Kosmala, Charles Pikler, William Preucil, Juliet White-Smith
	7	1999	University of Guelph; Guelph, Ontario	(United Kingdom) Lawrence Power	(Germany) Roland Glassl	(United States) Elizabeth Freivogel	Held in conjunction with the 27th International Viola Congress. Jury: Ralph Aldrich, Alan deVeritch, Hartmut Lindemann, John White
	6	1997	University of Texas at Austin; Austin, Texas	(United States) Christina Castelli	(United States) Rita Porfiris	(United States) Karin Brown	Held in conjunction with the 25th International Viola Congress. Jury: Karen Tuttle, Alan deVeritch, David Holland, Karen Ritscher
	5	1995	Indiana University; Bloomington, Indiana	(United States) Catherine Basrak	(United States) Joan DerHovsepian	(Taiwan) / (United States) Scott Lee	Held in conjunction with the 23rd International Viola Congress. Jury: Donna Lively Clark, James Dunham, Csaba Erdélyi, Abram Skernick, Thomas Tatton, Marcus Thompson
	4	1993	Northwestern University; Evanston, Illinois	(United States) Nokuthula Ngwenyama	(United States) Kathryn Lockwood	— not awarded —	Held in conjunction with the 21st International Viola Congress. Jury: William Preucil (Chairman), David Dalton, Mary Arlin, Paul Coletti, William Magers, Thomas Tatton
	3	1991	Ithaca College; Ithaca, New York	(United States) Kirsten Docter	(Hong Kong) Kin-Fung Leung	— not awarded —	Held in conjunction with the 19th International Viola Congress. Jury: Emanuel Vardi (Chairman), Harold Coletta, David Dalton, Rosemary Glyde, Pamela Goldsmith, John White
	2	1989	University of Redlands; Redlands, California	(United States) Daniel Foster	(China) Ming Pak	(China) Kai Tang	Held in conjunction with the 17th International Viola Congress. Jury: Louis Kievman (Chairman), David Dalton, Alan deVeritch, Roberto Díaz, Rosemary Glyde, Donald McInnes, Dwight Pounds, Sven Reher, Karen Tuttle
	1	1987	University of Michigan; Ann Arbor, Michigan	(United States) Lynne Richburg	(United Kingdom) Carla-Maria Rodrigues	(Greece) Paris Anastasiadis	Held in conjunction with the 15th International Viola Congress. Jury: Robert Oppelt (Chairman), David Dalton, Rosemary Glyde, Nathan Gordon, Louis Kievman, Dwight Pounds, Ann Woodward
1	—	1979	Brigham Young University; Provo, Utah	(United States) Geraldine Walther	(Japan) Jun Takahira	(United States) Patricia McCarty	Jury: William Primrose, Ralph Aldrich, Joseph de Pasquale

== Required composition ==
A compulsory work to be performed by all competitors has been selected for some competitions.

- 2027 – newly commissioned solo viola work by Sungji Hong
- 2024 – Remembrance for viola and piano by Nokuthula Ngwenyama (b. 1976)
- 2014 – Aldonza, Movement II from the Viola Concerto (2013) by Christian Colberg (b. 1968); Christian Colberg website
- 2011 – Inner Voices for viola solo (2011) by Peter Askim (b. 1971); published by American Viola Society
- 2008 – Recitative for viola solo (2007) by Scott Slapin (b. 1974); published by Liben Music Publishers
- 1991 – Aria and Allegro for viola and string orchestra (1990) by Richard Lane (1933–2004)
- 1989 – Concerto for Viola and Orchestra (1989) by Wayne Bohrnstedt (b. 1923)

== See also ==
- List of classical music competitions
- Lionel Tertis International Viola Competition
- Maurice Vieux International Viola Competition
- Carl Flesch International Violin Competition – also judged violists from 1970
- Primrose International Viola Archive
