= Lionel Tertis International Viola Competition =

International music competition

The Lionel Tertis International Viola Competition is an international music competition for viola players established in 1980 to honor the memory of the English viola virtuoso Lionel Tertis. Up to 2019 this triennial event was held at the Erin Arts Centre, Port Erin, Isle of Man. The competition did not take place during the years of the Coronavirus pandemic and resumed in January 2025 at The Glasshouse, Gateshead. The competition has now been paired with the Cecil Aronowitz International Viola Competition (CAIVC). The two competitions will run concurrently. Participants in the Tertis competition are of any nationality and must be aged between 19 - 30 at the time of the competition.

The 14th Lionel Tertis International Viola Competition was held from 19 to 25 January 2025.

The 13th Lionel Tertis International Festival was held from 6 to 13 April 2019, and attracted 107 entries from around the world.

== Lionel Tertis International Viola Competition ==
No.	Year	1st Prize	2nd Prize	3rd Prize	Jurists / Notes
14	2025	(United States) Sam Rosenthal	(France) Nicolas Garrigues	(Sweden) Ami-Louise Johnsson	George Caird (Chairperson), Françoise Gneri, Robin Ireland, Lilli Maijala, Thomas Selditz
13	2019	(United States) Paul Vincent Laraia III	(China) Yuchen Lu	(France) Paul Adrien Zientara	George Caird (Chairman), William Coleman, Carol Rodland, Danusha Waskiewicz, Mikhail Zemtsov
12	2016	(United Kingdom) Timothy Ridout	(France) Manuel Vioque-Judde	(China) Wenhong Luo	George Caird (Chairman), Yuri Bashmet, Wing Ho, Garth Knox, Thomas Riebl
11	2013	(China) Ziyu Shen	(Japan) Kei Tojo	(United States) Matthew Lipman (tie) (China) Shuangshuang Liu (tie)	Brian Hawkins (Chairman), Betil Başeğmezler, Yuri Bashmet, Sarah-Jane Bradley, Samuel Rhodes, Jean Sulem, Hong-Mei Xiao
10	2010	(United States) Milena Pajaro-van de Stadt	(South Korea) Kyoungmin Park	(Germany) Veit Hertenstein	Christopher Yates (Chairman), Garfield Jackson, Tatjana Masurenko, Hartmut Rohde, Simon Rowland-Jones, Pierre-Henri Xuereb, Su Zhen
9	2006	(United States) David Kim	(China) Peijun Xu	(Poland) / (United States) Ewa Grzywna	John Wallace (Chairman), Vladimír Bukač, Michael Kugel, Kenta Matsumi, Hariolf Schlichtig, Roger Tapping
8	2003	(Israel) Yuval Gotlibovich	(Ukraine) Maxim Rysanov	(Israel) Maya Rasooly	John Wallace (Chairman), Atar Arad, Yuri Bashmet, Luigi Alberto Bianchi, Martin Outram, Lars Anders Tomter
7	2000	— not awarded —	(France) Agathe Blondel (tie) (Russia) Andrei Oussov (tie)	(Israel) Arie Schachter	Howard Snell (Chairman), Yuri Bashmet, Sally Beamish, Masao Kawasaki, Hartmut Lindemann, Bruno Pasquier, Christopher Wellington; 4th Prize: (United Kingdom) Rebecca Jones
6	1997	(Germany) Roland Glassl	(Canada) Steve Larson	(Russia) Mikhail Bereznitsky	Philip Jones (Chairman), Yuri Bashmet, Thérèse-Marie Gilissen, Lubomír Malý, Yizhak Schotten, Paul Silverthorne
5	1994	(Israel) Gilad Karni	(Japan) Kenta Matsumi	(Taiwan) Scott Lee	Philip Jones (Chairman), Yuri Bashmet, Kazuhide Isomura, Michael Kugel, Paul Neubauer, John White
4	1991	— not awarded —	(Japan) Tomoko Ariu (tie) (Australia) Andra Darzins (tie)	(United Kingdom) Esther Geldard	Sir David Lumsden (Chairman), Yuri Bashmet, Harry Danks, Jerzy Kosmala, Milan Škampa
3	1988	(Taiwan) Hsin-Yun Huang	(United Kingdom) Jane Atkins	(Canada) Jean-Eric Soucy	Sir David Lumsden (Chairman), Yuri Bashmet, Harry Danks, Paul Hindmarsch, Thomas Riebl, Emanuel Vardi
2	1984	(United States) Cynthia Phelps	(United Kingdom) Paul Coletti	(Portugal) / (United Kingdom) Carla-Maria Rodrigues	Lady Evelyn Barbirolli (Chairman), Paul Cropper, Hirofumi Fukai, Alfred Lipka, Donald McInnes, Simon Streatfeild
1	1980	(United States) Paul Neubauer	(United States) / (Armenia) Kim Kashkashian	— not awarded —	Gerald McDonald (Chairman), Harry Danks, Paul Doktor, Csaba Erdélyi, Piero Farulli, Milan Škampa

== Required composition ==
A compulsory work to be performed by all competitors is commissioned (or selected) for each competition.

- 2025 – The Bridges of Newcastle (The broon toon tune) for viola solo (2024) by Garth Knox; published by Schott
- 2019 – Canto for viola solo (2018) by Roxanna Panufnik
- 2016 – fenodyree for viola solo (2015) by Stuart MacRae
- 2013 – 6 Sorano Variants for viola solo (2012) by Peter Maxwell Davies; published by Boosey & Hawkes
- 2010 – Petite Sonatine 1 for viola solo (2009) by Roger Steptoe; published by Editions BIM
- 2006 – Darkness Draws In for viola solo, Op. 102 (2005) by David Matthews; published by Faber Music Ltd.
- 2003 – Through a Limbeck for viola solo (2002) by John Woolrich; published by Faber Music Ltd.
- 2000 – Pennillion for viola solo (1998) by Sally Beamish; available through the Scottish Music Centre; This work was selected, not commissioned.
- 1997 – Rondel for viola solo (1996) by Richard Rodney Bennett; published by Novello & Co.
- 1994 – Odd Man Out for viola solo (1994) by Michael Berkeley; published by Oxford University Press
- 1991 – February Sonatina for viola solo (1990) by John McCabe; published by Novello & Co.
- 1988 – Tides of Mananan for viola solo, Op. 64 (1988) by Paul Patterson; published by Josef Weinberger
- 1984 – Concerto for viola and orchestra, Op. 131 (1983) by Wilfred Josephs; published by Mornington Music Ltd. / Novello & Co.
- 1980 – Concerto No. 2 in G major for viola and orchestra (1979) by Gordon Jacob; published by Boosey & Hawkes

== See also ==
- List of classical music competitions
- Maurice Vieux International Viola Competition
- Primrose International Viola Competition
