= Tianjin Juilliard School =

Private music conservatory in Tianjin, China

- 天津茱莉亚学院
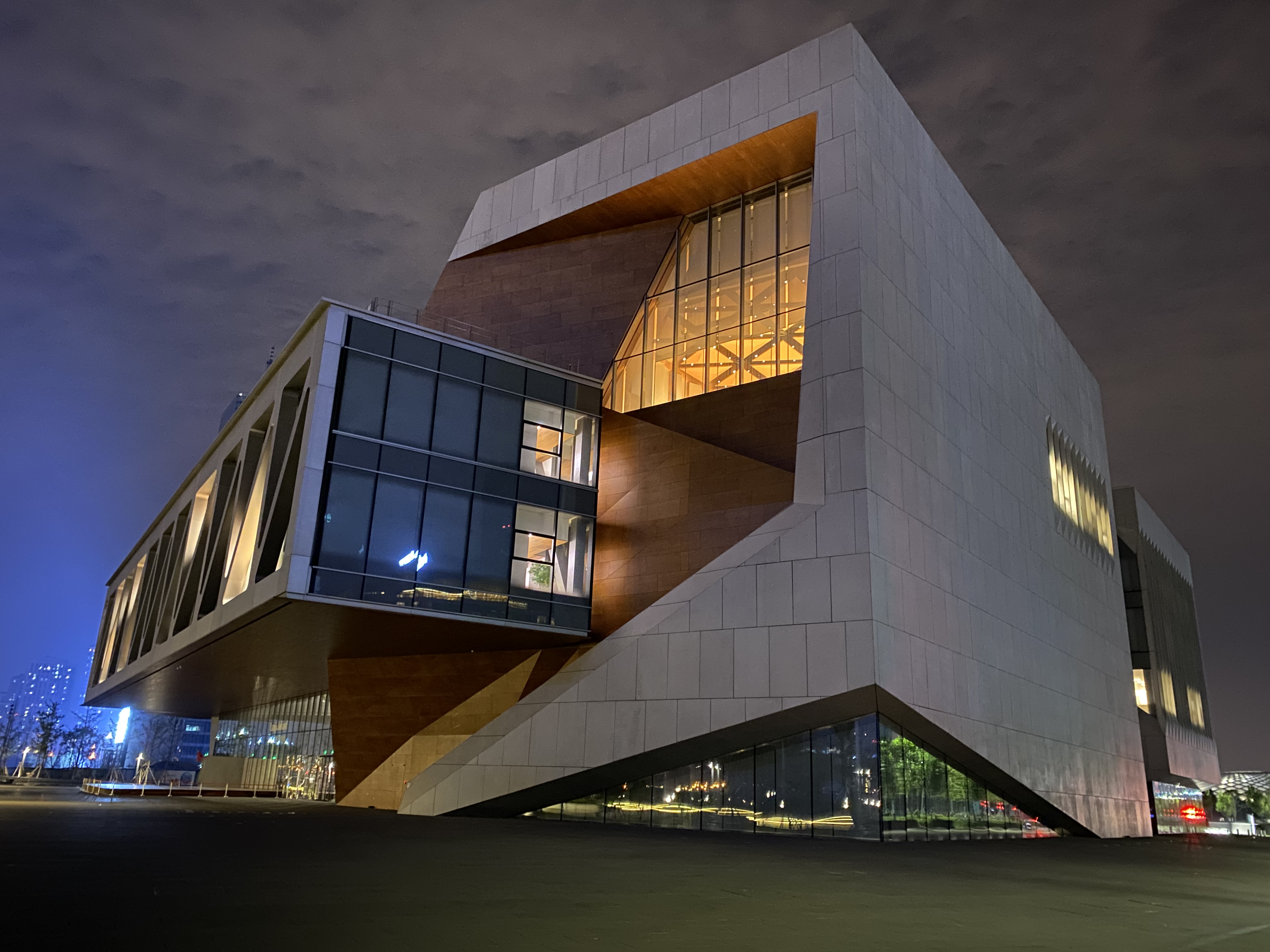
- Type: Private conservatory
- Established: 2019
- Parent institution: Juilliard School
- Chairman: Joseph W. Polisi
- Chancellor: Changjun Xu
- Dean: Katherine Chu
- Director: Wei He
- Students: Pre-college: 105 (2021); Graduate: 70 (2021)
- Location: 2946 Xinhua Road, Binhai, Tianjin, 300450, China; 39°00′08″N 117°40′24″E
- Campus: Urban
- Website: https://www.tianjinjuilliard.edu.cn

The Tianjin Juilliard School (simplified Chinese: 天津茱莉亚学院; traditional Chinese: 天津茱莉亞學院; pinyin: Tiānjīn Zhūlìyà Xuéyuàn) is a branch of the Juilliard School located in Binhai, Tianjin, China. It is the first institution in China which offers a U.S.-accredited Master of Music degree.

== History ==
In 2012, the Juilliard School signed an agreement with Tianjin Innovative Financial Investment Co., Tianjin Municipal Education Commission, and the Tianjin Conservatory of Music, to build a school in the Yujiapu Financial District of Binhai in Tianjin. The school was to be managed by Juilliard.

On September 28, 2015 during a trip from the First Lady of China Peng Liyuan, the dean of the Juilliard School, Joseph W. Polisi, announced that the school will build a research institute in Tianjin in 2018. In July 2016, the architectural design plan of the Tianjin Juilliard School was finalized by Diller Scofidio + Renfro. The Tianjin Juilliard School site project started construction on February 28, 2017. Due to many delays including the National Games of China, multiple construction projects in the area, as well as the COVID-19 pandemic, construction was finally completed in October 2020. The complex includes a 690-seat concert hall, a 299-seat recital hall, and a 225-seat black-box theater.

After a year of the pre-college division operating from the Tianjin Conservatory, the Tianjin Juilliard School started operating in the fall of 2020 with its first class of 39 students from 11 countries. On October 26, 2021, the Tianjin Juilliard School held a campus inauguration ceremony of its landmark campus with Peng Liyuan expressing her continued support. On May 20, 2022, the first class graduated from the school.

== Programs ==
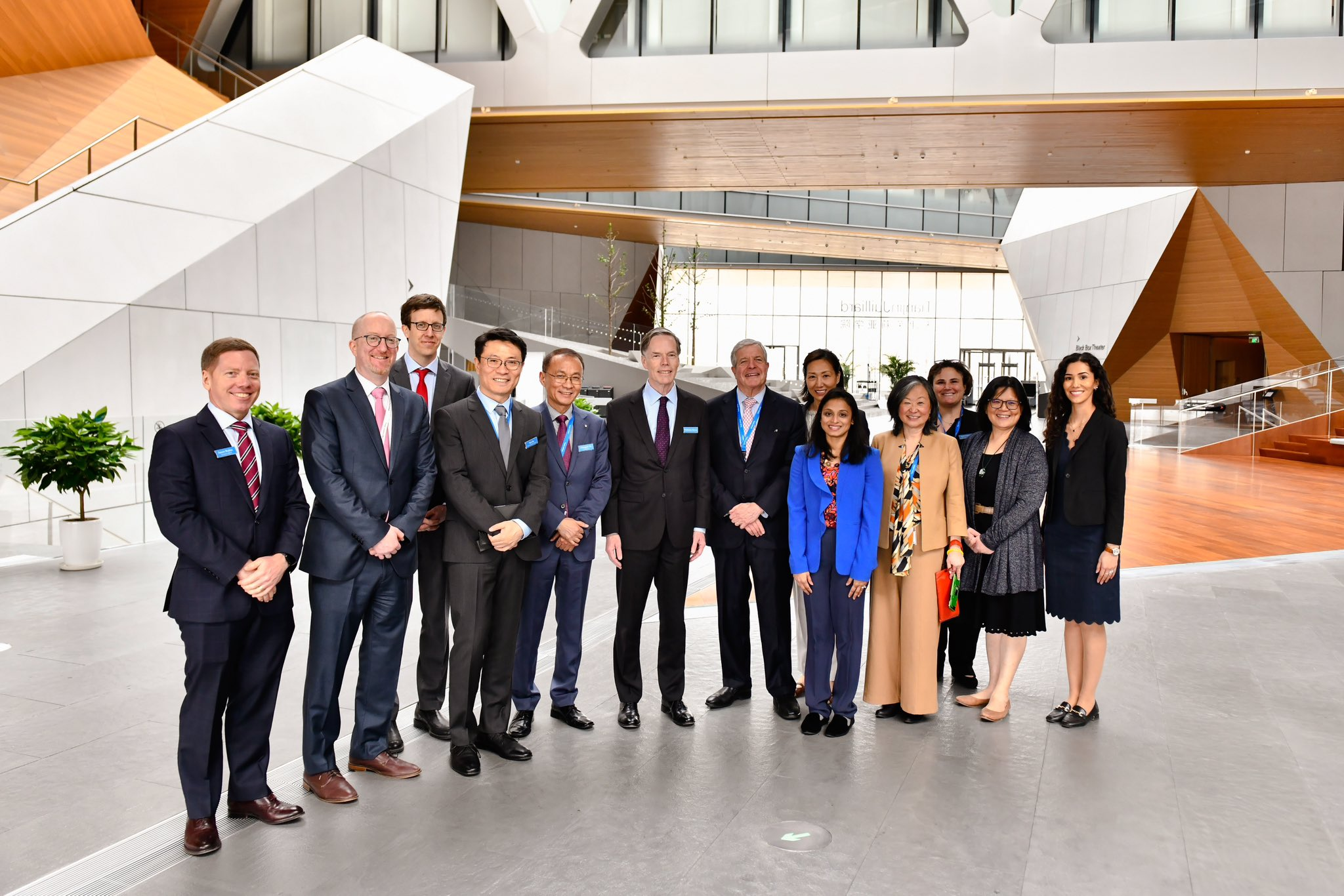
On March 24, 2023, U.S. Ambassador to China R. Nicholas Burns visited the Tianjin Juilliard School

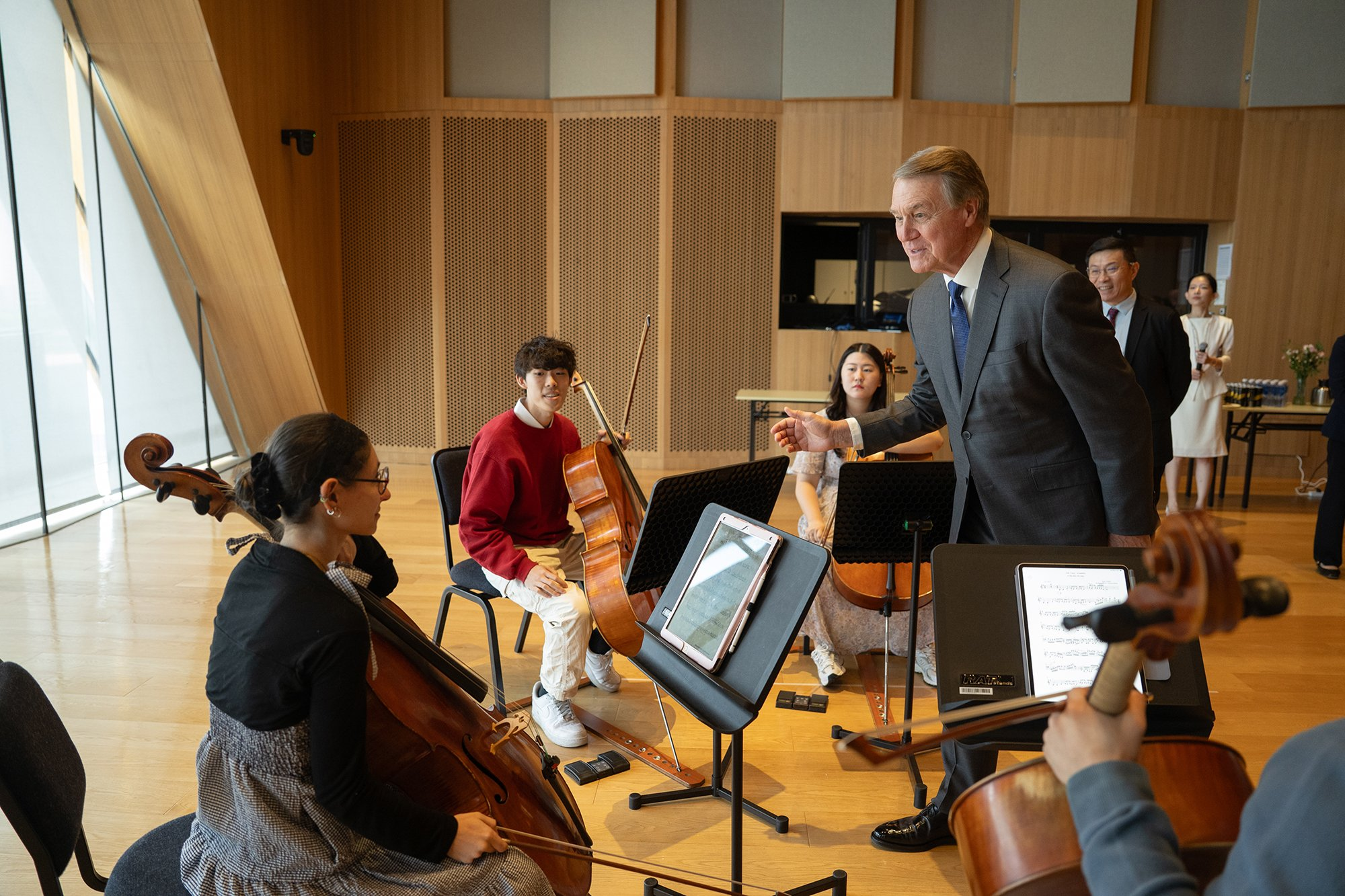
On September 29, 2025, U.S. Ambassador to China David Perdue visited the Tianjin Juilliard School

=== Graduate Studies ===
The Graduate Studies program offers Masters of Music degrees in orchestral studies, chamber music, and collaborative piano. Pre-formed groups for the chamber music program have the chance to take part in the Tianjin Juilliard Chamber Music Fellowship Program which features professional and personal benefits including financial rewards and performance opportunities in China and New York.

=== Pre-College ===
The Pre-College division opened in 2019 while based in the Tianjin Conservatory and is made for students aged 8-18. Classes take place from 8:30am to 7:00pm on Saturdays during the school year which includes core classes of private lessons, chamber music, ear training, music theory, chorus, and English for music, major-specific courses including orchestra, studio class, and courses specific to pianists, composers, percussionists, and reed instrumentalists, and elective courses including lessons on a secondary instrument, conducting, and group composition.

=== Other ===
The school also provides public education and continuing education programs. The Public Education Program consists of the Music Development Program meant for serious students and Music Discovery which serves as an introductory course. The Continuing Education program consists of English for Professional Musicianship and the Professional Development Program which is centered around pedagogy.

== Notable people ==
=== Teachers ===
- Richard Aaron
- Sheila Browne
- Elaine Douvas
- Gergely Ittzés
- Yoheved Kaplinsky
- Joel Krosnick
- Akio Koyama
- Anna Lee
- Joseph Lin
- Charles Neidich
- Erik Ralske
- Carol Rodland
- Andrew Tyson
- Nicholas Tzavaras
- Carol Wincenc
- Zhang Daxun
- Nancy Zhou
