= Teng Li =

Chinese-Canadian violist

- Born: Nanjing, Jiangsu, China
- Genre: Classical
- Occupation: Musician
- Instrument: Viola
- Label: Azica Records
- Website: tengliviola.com

Teng Li (born in Nanjing, China) is a Chinese-Canadian violist. She is currently the principal violist of the Chicago Symphony Orchestra, and holds the position of Artist Faculty in Viola at The Music Conservatory of Roosevelt University's Chicago College of Performing Arts. From 2018 to 2024, she was the principal violist of the Los Angeles Philharmonic, following 14 seasons with the Toronto Symphony Orchestra. She is also the artistic director of Morningside Music Bridge and is a member of the Rosamunde String Quartet, led by Noah Bendix-Balgley.

== Education ==
Li began the violin at five years old. In 1992, she entered the Central Conservatory of Music in Beijing and at the age of sixteen, was accepted to study at the Curtis Institute of Music in Philadelphia, where she studied with Michael Tree, Joseph de Pasquale, and Karen Tuttle.

== Career ==
Alongside solo appearances with the Los Angeles Philharmonic, Toronto Symphony Orchestra, and Oklahoma City Philharmonic, Li has performed with the Munich Chamber Orchestra, Haddonfield Symphony Orchestra, Santa Rosa Symphony, Shanghai Opera Orchestra, National Chamber Orchestra, and Esprit Orchestra. Her performances have been broadcast on CBC Radio 2, WQXR-FM (New York), WHYY-FM (Pennsylvania), WFMT (Chicago), and the Bavarian Radio Symphony (Munich).

Li is also an active recitalist and chamber musician, regularly appearing at the Marlboro Music Festival, Santa Fe Chamber Music Festival, Mostly Mozart Festival, Music from Angel Fire, Moritzburg Festival (Germany) and the Rising Stars Festival in Caramoor. She has performed with the Guarneri Quartet in New York, at Carnegie Hall, and with the Chamber Music Society at 92nd Street Y. She was also featured with the Guarneri Quartet in their last season in 2009, and was also a member of the prestigious Chamber Music Society of Lincoln Center Two program.

In addition to her current position teaching at Chicago College of Performing Arts, Li teaches at the Sarasota Music Festival and Morningside Music Bridge and has held previous positions at the Colburn School, University of Toronto, Royal Conservatory of Music in Toronto and Montreal's Conservatoire de Musique.

== Awards and Prizes ==
Li is a top prize winner at the ARD International Music Competition, Primrose International Viola Competition, the Irving M. Klein International String Competition and the Johansen International Competition for Young String Players. She was also a winner of the 2003 Astral National Auditions.

== Recordings ==
- 1939 – Teng Li, Benjamin Bowman, Meng-chieh Liu. Producers: David Jaeger, Teng Li, Ron Searles. Recorded at the Glenn Gould Studio, Toronto. Label: Azica Records. June 2015
