= Sheila Browne (musician) =

American musician

Sheila Browne is an American-Irish concert violist from Gladwyne, Pennsylvania with dual citizenship. She is a concert and recording artist and Associate Professor at the University of Delaware. For ten years she was on faculty and Associate Professor of Viola at the University of North Carolina School of the Arts. Named the William Primrose Recitalist of 2016 in conjunction with the Primrose International Viola Archive (PIVA), Ms. Browne has played solo, concerto and chamber music concerts and has played principal of orchestras on six continents, performing in major venues in Africa, the Americas, Asia, Europe, Australia, and the Middle East. She is in the Fire Pink Trio and principal of the New York Women's Philharmonic, making her Carnegie- Stern Hall concerto debut in 2011 (formerly NYWE). Browne is the Director and faculty member of the January Karen Tuttle Viola Workshop, founder in 2015 and faculty member of the first European Karen Tuttle Viola Workshop at NYU- Prague 2016, and has served on the Executive Board of the American Viola Society Ms. Browne was the violist of the Gotham, Arianna, Pelligrini and Serafin string quartets. She has served on the faculties of Duke and New York universities, University of Missouri- St. Louis and of Tennessee- Knoxville, and Juilliard's Music Advancement Program.

During the summer of 2009 Sheila Browne became the first viola professor ever to teach in Iraqi Kurdistan for the inaugural year of the National Youth Orchestra of Iraq.

She has recorded CDs on the Albany Records, Bridge, Centaur, ERM, MSR and Nonesuch Records labels, and has premiered many new works by composers including Dan Coleman, Lawrence Dillon, and Kenneth Jacobs, and has recorded Cds with Natalie Cole, Paula Cole, Lisa Loeb, Audra MacDonald, and Carol Wincenc, and on major motion picture soundtracks such as Any Given Sunday.

She has made television appearances on the David Letterman Show with Aretha Franklin, and on Good Morning America with Barry Manilow at Lincoln Center.

Browne has played principal and soloed under conductors Michael Tilson Thomas, Leonard Slatkin, JoAnn Falletta, as well as under Eiji Oue, Pierre Boulez, Michael Gielen, Robert Spano, Kurt Masur, Zubin Mehta, Plácido Domingo, Paavo Jarvi. She has played in the St. Louis Symphony as well as in the Southwest Radio Symphony Orchestra in Baden - Wurttemberg, Germany.

She has performed with members of the Amernet, Audubon, Borromeo, Brentano, Calidore, Cleveland, Guarneri and Vermeer string quartets, Diaz Trio, Ruth Laredo, Gil Kalish, Anton Kuerti, Eugenia Zuckerman, Carol Wincenc, David Krakauer, Richard Stolzman, Joseph Robinson.

Browne has been featured in several books: The Musician's Way by Gerald Klickstein and UPBEAT: The Story of the National Youth Orchestra of Iraq, and has been featured in the PBS Documentary with Michael Tilson Thomas, "Beethoven Alive!"

Sheila Browne studied with Karen Tuttle and the Juilliard String Quartet at the Juilliard School, where Ms. Browne was Tuttle's teaching assistant for four years, earning a Bachelor of Music degree. She later studied in Germany with soloist Kim Kashkashian after being awarded a DAAD grant for an Aufbaustudium degree at the Hochschule fuer Musik in Freiburg. She was Karen Ritscher's teaching assistant at Rice University's Shepherd School of Music, where the Gotham Quartet was in Paul Katz's String Quartet Residency Program (M.M.). She also studied with the principal violist of Philadelphia Opera Company, Evelyn Jacobs- Luise. Sheila Browne is a pedagogical descendant of William Primrose and Eugene Ysaye as well as Max Aronoff and Carl Flesch.

She was twice co- principal of Alexander Schneider's String Orchestra Seminar at Carnegie Hall and the Kennedy Center, as well as principal violist for New World Symphony's Tenth Anniversary European Tour under the direction of Michael Tilson Thomas with soloist Barbara Hendricks. She was once the youngest member of the Philadelphia Youth Orchestra, playing in programs at the New School of Music, Temple University's Preparatory Division, Delaware County Youth Orchestra, Settlement Music School Chamber Orchestra, Boston University Tanglewood Institute, Civic Orchestra of Chicago, Evian, Great Lakes Festival, Banff Centre for the Arts Solo Residency, Jeunesses Musicales, Music Academy of the West, Luzerne Music Center. She has been on faculties of California Summer Music, Montecito, Innsbruck, Luzerne Music Center, Green Mountain Chamber Music Festival, Summer Strings at UNCSA. She is a prizewinner of the 2000 Fischoff National Chamber Music Competition.
