= Dinerchtein =

Dinerchtein is a surname. Notable people with the surname include:

- Alexandre Dinerchtein (born 1980), Russian Go player
- Viacheslav Dinerchtein (born 1976), violist
