= Sheila Browne =

Sheila Browne may refer to:

- Sheila Browne (musician), American-Irish concert violist
- Sheila Browne (educator) (1924–2015), English academic specialising in Medieval French
