= Michael Kugel =

Ukrainian viola player and composer (born 1946)

Michael Kugel (Ukrainian: Михайло Бенедиктович Кугель; born December 5, 1946) is a Ukrainian viola player and composer.

== Education ==
Born in Kharkiv, USSR, he attended various post-secondary music programs.

== Career ==
From 1975 to 1996, Michael Kugel was an academic and musician.

Kugel has been a jury member for competitions including:

- V Lionel Tertis International Viola Competition, Workshop and World Viola Congress, 1994
- First International Viola Competition in Vienna, 1998
- Primrose Memorial Viola Competition, 1999
- IX Lionel Tertis International Viola competition and Workshop, 2006

== Awards ==
The 1975 International Viola Competition joint winners were Zoltan Toth and Kugel.

== Books ==
- The history of an era. An interpretation of two works for viola (2002, ISBN 978-2-87304-001-7)

== Selected compositions ==
Kugel's compositions are published by Alain Van Kerckhoven Editeur.

- Il Carnevale di Venezia for Viola and Piano (2001)
- Classical Preludes for Viola and Piano (1999)
- Sonata-Poem for Viola Solo (1987)
- Suite in Memoriam Shostakovich for Viola and Piano (1988)

== Discography ==
He made them in the former Soviet Union but most of those records are unavailable.

His recent recordings include:

- In Memoriam Shostakovich. Michael Kugel (viola), Vesna Podrug (piano), 1998, ASIN B000068VGR
- The recorded viola. Volume IV. Pearl GEMS 0039, PhonCD R2448 reva v.4, 1998
- Mark Kopytman, Beyond all this... The Israel Camerata, Avner Biron (conductor), Michael Kugel (viola), 1999, IMI-CD-1929-03
- Glinka, Paganini, Bizet, Waxman. Michael Kugel (viola) Asir Rozenberg (piano), 1999
- The greatest Russian violists (MELODIA)-2009.
- Michael Kugel - Boris Berezovsky (MELODIA - 2014)
