= Martha Strongin Katz =

Martha Strongin Katz is a violist and member of the faculty of the New England Conservatory of Music (NEC) in Boston, Massachusetts, where she teaches viola and chamber music. She was a founding member of the Cleveland Quartet, along with her former husband, Paul Katz (cellist), and Peter Salaff and Donald Weilerstein (violinists). From 1969 until her departure from the group in 1980, she performed more than 1,000 concerts, including appearances at the White House, the Grammy Awards, on the NBC Today Show, and in the major concert halls of five continents.

A noted soloist, her appearances include a Carnegie Hall performance of Berlioz's Harold en Italie with conductor Michael Tilson Thomas, the Bartók Viola Concerto with L'Orchestre de la Suisse Romande in Geneva, recital and concerto performances at the 1989 International Viola Congress, and countless recital and concerto appearances.

Strongin Katz plays a viola made by Lorenzo Storioni of Cremona in 1800.

Ms. Strongin Katz previously served as a Professor of Viola at the Shepherd School of Music at Rice University from 1996–2000 and at the Eastman School of Music, where she taught from 1976–1996. She has performed and taught at many summer music festivals, including: the Aspen Music Festival, the Banff Center for The ArtsNew, the Interlochen Arts Academy, Kneisel Hall in Bluehill, Maine, the Marlboro Music Festival, Musicorda at Mt. Holyoke College, the Perlman Music Program in Shelter Island, NY, the Steans Institute for Young Artists at the Ravinia Festival, the Santa Fe Chamber Music Festival, the Yale Summer School of Chamber Music, and the Heifetz International Music institute.

She has served on the jury of several prestigious international music competitions, including the Walter W. Naumburg Viola Competition and the Banff International String Quartet Competition.

She studied violin with Raphael Bronstein and Ivan Galamian and viola with Lillian Fuchs and William Primrose, attending the Curtis Institute, Juilliard School of Music, Manhattan School of Music, and the University of Southern California.

In 1969, she was co-winner of the 1969 Geneva International Viola Competition, where she also earned the Max Reger Award.

The Recordings of the Cleveland Quartet, which appear on the RCA Red Seal label, received six Grammy nominations during her tenure. The quartet was joined by pianist Alfred Brendel for a recording of the Schubert "Trout" Quintet on the Philips label.

She is the sister of poet Lynn Strongin.
