= Roger Steptoe =

English composer and pianist

Roger Steptoe (born 1953) is an English composer and pianist. He studied music at the University of Reading as an undergraduate and then at the Royal Academy of Music, London, from 1974 to 1977 as a post-graduate student. There he studied composition with Alan Bush and piano accompaniment with Geoffrey Pratley.

His String Quartet No. 1 (1976) and the opera King of Macedon (1978–79, to a libretto by Ursula Vaughan Williams, based on a stage play by Charterhouse school pupil 1973-77 Charles Jockelson) were composed during his time as composer in residence at Charterhouse School from 1976 to 1979. Between 1980 and 1991 he was professor of composition at the Royal Academy of Music. Notable works during this period include the Clarinet Quintet and the solo piano piece Equinox, a series of concertos, and the Elegy on the Death and Burial of Cock Robin (1988) for counter tenor and strings.

As a pianist, Steptoe recorded the first modern performances of the Walton and Bridge piano quartets, and in the first recording of the Four Last Songs by Vaughan Williams. Anthony Bye has described Steptoe's style as "wholeheartedly in the tradition of Vaughan Williams, Finzi, Howells, Britten and Tippett...regenerated with thoroughly contemporary means of expression".

== Selected works ==
=== Opera ===
- King of Macedon (1978–1979); 3 acts; libretto by Ursula Vaughan Williams
- As You Like It, (2015-2016 ); 3 Acts; libretto by Lesley Fernández-Armesto; first performed at the University of Notre Dame, Indiana, 2016

=== Orchestral ===
- Cheers! (1993)
- This Side of Winter (2002)
- A Three-Tango Rhapsody (2007)
- Two Miniatures for strings (1977)

=== Concertante ===
- Concerto for cello and chamber orchestra (1991)
- Concerto for clarinet and strings (1989)
- Concerto for oboe and strings (1982)
- Concerto for tuba and strings (1983)
- Light, Sinfonietta for organ and strings (2006–2007)

=== Chamber music ===
- Clarinet Quintet (1980)
- Dance Suite for oboe, clarinet and string quartet (1984)
- Duo for oboe and harp (1991)
- Oboe Quartet (1988–1989)
- Petite Sonatine 1 for viola solo (2009); commissioned for the 2010 Lionel Tertis International Viola Competition
- Petite Sonatine 2 for cello solo (2009)
- Quatre romances sans paroles for piano quartet (2001)
- Sonata No.3 for brass quintet (1982)
- Sonata for clarinet and piano (2003)
- Sonata for trumpet and organ (2008)
- Sonata for tuba and piano (2007)
- Sonata for viola and piano (2010)
- Sonata No.1 for violin and piano (1983)
- Sonata No.2 for violin and piano (1986)
- String Quartet No.1 (1976)
- String Quartet No.2 (1985)
- String Quartet No.3 (2002)
- String Quartet No.4 (2003)
- Study for solo violin (1978)
- Three Pieces for viola and piano (1982)
- Two Impromptus for solo clarinet (1978)
- Two Studies for bassoon and piano (1983)

=== Piano ===
- Equinox (1981)
- Piano Sonata No.1 (1979)
- Piano Sonata No.2 (1988)
- Piano Sonata No.3 (2003)
- Three Nocturnes (1991)
- Three Preludes (1976)

=== Vocal ===
- Aspects for high voice and piano (1978)
- The Bond of the Sea for bass baritone and piano (1983); text by Joseph Conrad
- An Elegy on the Death and Burial of Cock Robin for countertenor and 11 solo strings (1988)
- Four Shakespeare sonnets for baritone and string orchestra (2013)
- Five Songs for tenor and piano (1976); poems by Percy Shelley and John Keats
- The Looking Glass for soprano, oboe and piano (1980); words by Ursula Vaughan Williams
- 3 Paul Verlaine Songs (3 French Songs) for mezzo-soprano, viola and piano (2009); words by Paul Verlaine
- Three Sonnets to Delia for baritone and piano (1993); poems by Samuel Daniel
