= Cathy Basrak =

American violist

- Genre: classical music
- Occupation: violist
- Instrument: viola
- Label: Cedille Records

Cathy Basrak (born 1977) is an American violist. She is the assistant principal violist of the Boston Symphony Orchestra and gave the premiere of John Williams' viola concerto. She previously won several important viola competitions such as the 1995 Primrose International Viola Competition, Irving M. Klein Competition, and others. Basrak studied with Michael Tree, Joseph de Pasquale, and Roland and Almita Vamos.
