= Richard Fleischman =

American musician (born 1963)

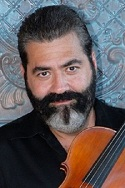
Richard Fleischman

Richard Fleischman (born 1963) is an American violist and viola d'amore player, conductor and pedagogue.

Winner of the 1988 Windsor Prize, presented by Leonard Bernstein, the 1984 Edward Steuermann Prize and a Naumberg Scholarship from the Juilliard School. Fleischman plays a viola built for him by Hiroshi Iizuka and a viola d'amore made by Martin Biller.

== Education ==
Born in Flushing, Queens, New York City, Fleischman grew up in Manalapan, New Jersey, beginning violin studies at the age of 9 and switching to viola at age 12. By the age of 15 he had already composed two operas and assorted works for string quartet and orchestra. He attended Manalapan High School.

At age 16, he was accepted at The Juilliard School Pre-College Division, where he studied viola with Eugene Becker and chamber music with flutist Julius Baker and legendary cellist Leonard Rose.

After receiving his pre-college diploma, he went on to study on scholarship in the college division of The Juilliard School, receiving the Bachelor of Music and Master of Music Degrees in a total of four years.

While at The Juilliard School, he served as principal violist of the Juilliard Philharmonia, the Juilliard Chamber Orchestra, the Juilliard Symphony and the Juilliard Orchestra. At Juilliard, he studied viola with William Lincer, long-time principal violist of the New York Philharmonic and was his teaching assistant during 1984–85. He also studied chamber music with the Juilliard String Quartet and composition with Vincent Persichetti. At commencement, he was awarded the Eduard Steuermann Memorial Prize by the Juilliard faculty.

After graduation from The Juilliard School with his B.M.and M.M., he was invited by legendary violist Joseph de Pasquale (1919–2015), then principal of the Philadelphia Orchestra, to study at the Curtis Institute of Music, where he also studied chamber music repertoire with Felix Galimir.

== Conducting ==
It was at the Curtis Institute that he met and studied conducting with Max Rudolf, followed by study in Germany with Sergiu Celibidache.

He began his conducting career with ensembles such as the Chamber Orchestra of Philadelphia and as conductor of the San Francisco Concerto Orchestra in the early 1990s. He conducted a gala baroque concert in 1994 with members of the San Francisco Symphony and singers from the San Francisco Opera.

In 2003, he conducted The Santa Fe Virtuosi (members of the Santa Fe Opera Orchestra) in a special tribute memorial concert to its founder, John Crosby, performing Richard Strauss' "Metamorphosen."

He was music director of the Renaissance Chamber Orchestra in a series of critically acclaimed performances from 2004 to 2005.

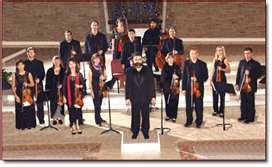
Conducting the Renaissance Chamber Orchestra in 2004

== Solo and chamber music career ==
As viola soloist, Fleischman has performed throughout the United States and Europe.

In 1988, with the Salzau String Quartet and pianist Justus Frantz at the Schleswig-Holstein Festival in Germany, he performed at the Villa Hammerschmidt in Bonn for an audience of the President of Germany, Richard von Weizsäcker and Sir Yehudi Menuhin. The Salzau Quartet also gave performances throughout Germany, including a live radio broadcast. In 1988, Fleischman appeared as viola soloist on live German television on the ZDF program Doppelpunkt.

Notable solo performances include the world premiere of Jose Raul Bernardo's "Concierto Cubano Barrocco" with the Miami Symphony Orchestra, and appearances with the Chamber Orchestra of Philadelphia on both viola and viola d'amore, The National Repertory Orchestra, the Symphony of the United Nations, the Curtis Symphony Orchestra (Bartok Viola Concerto), the AIMS Orchestra in Graz (Austria), the San Francisco Concerto Orchestra, Orchestra Miami, the Camerata Del Re, the Giovani Chamber Orchestra, the Pro Arte Chamber Orchestra and the Saratoga Symphony.

Recital appearances have include important venues in New York, Philadelphia, San Francisco and Miami.

As chamber musician, he has performed with the Pensacola Chamber Music Festival, the South Beach Chamber Ensemble, Chameleon Musicians, Amernet String Quartet, Salzau String Quartet and the Delray String Quartet. In 2012, he performed with the Santa Fe Chamber Music Festival. He was a co-founder of the Laurel Festival of the Arts, in Jim Thorpe, PA.

Since 1987, he has also given many solo performances on the viola d'amore, performing concerti of Vivaldi, Frank Martin (Sonata da Chiesa), Ghedini (Musica da Concerto for viola and viola d'amore), Casadesus (24 Preludes) and the North American Premiere of an Anonymous Concerto from c. 1750 Poland. From the Philadelphia Inquirer (1987):"*Many pieces have been written for the viola d'amore...but the early-music movement has largely bypassed this instrument, and even such acknowledged masterpieces as Vivaldi's four concerti for it are seldom heard live. All the more pleasure, then, to hear violist Richard Fleischman bring out its delicate, silvery tone in the concerto RV 393 - especially in so expert and sensitive a performance."

From 2006 to 2017, he was violist with the Delray String Quartet. The Delray String Quartet gave the world premiere of Kenneth Fuchs String Quartet no 5 (commissioned) in January 2012, recorded the work for Naxos Records the same month and was released in April 2013. In December 2011, Poinciana Records released "The Delray String Quartet: 2011 Hit Movements/Live performances." In 2014, a new release from Centaur Records featured the Delrays in works of Mahler, Glazunov and Franck. The Delrays commissioned American composer Richard Danielpour to compose his Seventh String Quartet "Songs of Solace." The work was given its world premiere in May 2015 and was recorded the same month for Naxos Records along with the composer's 5th and 6th Quartets. The recording was released in 2018. Fleischman was instrumental in securing the commissions of both the Fuchs and Danielpour works.

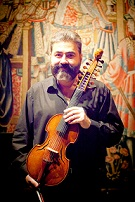
Fleischman gave the North American Premiere of Anonymous Concerto (c. 1750 Poland)for Viola d'amore at the Bass Museum of Art in Miami Beach, FL, 2011

== Orchestral career ==
He was a member of the San Francisco Symphony under the baton of Herbert Blomstedt (1990–1995) During this period, he recorded 20 CDs for London/Decca, including the Complete Symphonies of Jean Sibelius, works of Richard Strauss, Mahler, Beethoven, Bartok, Berwald, Hindemith, Brahms, Orff and Mendelssohn

Since 1990, Fleischman has been principal violist of the Santa Fe Opera Orchestra for 22 seasons, playing many of the great viola solos of the opera repertoire, such as Britten's Peter Grimes, Berg's Wozzeck and Strauss' Arabella.

Early in his career, he performed with the Philadelphia Orchestra and was principal violist in orchestras under such conductors as Sergiu Celibidache, Leonard Bernstein and Christoph Eschenbach at the Schleswig-Holstein Musik Festival.

At the invitation of Edo De Waart, he was Guest Principal violist of the Hong Kong Philharmonic from 2005 to 2007.

Other ensembles in which he performed as Principal violist include The Chamber Orchestra of Philadelphia, the Hamilton Philharmonic, the California Symphony, The National Repertory Orchestra, The Florida Grand Opera, The Miami City Ballet,(performing the solos in Coppelia, Giselle and Romeo and Juliet), The Florida Philharmonic, The Boca Raton Symphonia and the New Century Chamber Orchestra (a founding member).

== Teaching ==
Fleischman has been the Professor of Viola at New World School of the Arts in Miami, Florida since 1996.

His prize-winning viola and chamber music students have gone on to perform in orchestras such as the Los Angeles Philharmonic, Shanghai Symphony Orchestra, San Diego Symphony, Saint Louis Symphony, Orlando Philharmonic, Chicago Civic Orchestra and YouTube Symphony Orchestra and as soloist with the New World Symphony, Hong Kong Festival Orchestra, Chamber Orchestra of Philadelphia, Russian National Orchestra and the Ars Flores Orchestra.

Fleischman has given masterclasses around the world in universities and music conservatories, and frequently adjudicates in competitions.

== Recordings and video ==
He has recorded for Naxos, Centaur, London/Decca, Sony and Poinciana labels.
