= Viacheslav Dinerchtein =

Violinist

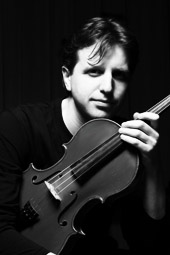

Background information
- Born: October 30, 1976 (age 48)
- Genres: Classical
- Occupation: Violist
- Instrument: Viola
- Labels: Solo Musica (Sony Music)
- Website: www.dinerchtein.com

Viacheslav Dinerchtein (born October 30, 1976) is a violist and an avid promoter of both novel and overlooked viola repertoire. He’s performed as a recitalist and chamber musician for the Kennedy Center, Carnegie Hall, and Palacio de Bellas Artes. Dinerchtein has appeared in music festivals in the Americas plus Europe. He has been a guest artist at International Viola Congresses. Dinerchtein has performed modern compositions for viola, president of the Swiss Viola Society. He’s also an editor for music publishing houses Amadeus Verlag and Ovation Press.

== Biography ==
Dinerchtein was born in Belarus and immigrated to Mexico in 1991. He resides with his family in Zurich, Switzerland.

== Career ==
His teachers include his father, Boris Dinerchtein, Joseph de Pasquale at the Peabody Conservatory, and Roland Vamos at Northwestern University. Dinerchtein holds the title of Doctor of Musical Arts from Northwestern University.
