= Klein Competition =

The Irving M. Klein International String Competition is a music competition held annually in June in San Francisco, California. The Klein is open to string players between the ages of 15 and 23 who are not under professional management. The competition was founded in 1985 in memory of Irving M. Klein, an acclaimed cellist and educator.

Each of eight or nine semifinalists, selected in a triple-blind review process from among 110 to 130 applicants, performs a 25-minute recital on the first day. The jury panel advances up to four finalists, who play 35-minute programs on the second day. The judges then award top prizes, which include substantial cash prizes and performance contracts. The performances are open to the public at the San Francisco Conservatory of Music and are live-streamed worldwide.

== Prize Winners ==
Past winners of the competition:

Year	1st	2nd	3rd	4th	
2025	Julia Schilz (violin)	Noam Ginsparg (cello)	Miles Reed (cello)	Elizabeth Poppy Song (violin) Joshua Kováč (cello)	
2024	Pearl de la Motte (viola)	Amelia Zitoun (cello)	Francis Tsai (violin)	Hannah Jeong (cello) Yeji Lim (violin)	
2023	Emad Zolfaghari (viola)	Audrey Goodner (violin)	Ray Ushikubo (violin)	Blaire Kim (violin) Vincent Garcia-Hettinger (cello)	
2022	Gaeun Kim (cello)	Jaewon Wee (violin)	Andromeda Kepecs (violin)	Jacques Forestier (violin) Hayoung Choi (violin)	
2021	Yuchen Lu (viola)	Grace Huh (violin)	William Tan (cello)	Ria Honda (violin) Serin Isabelle Park (violin)	
2020	Gabrielle Després (violin)	Jiaxun Yao (violin)	Masha Lakisova (violin)	Caroline Durham (violin); Dongyoung Shim (violin)	
2019	James Baik (cello)	Dakota Cotugno (cello)	Julia Mirzoev (violin)	Gabriel Polinsky (double bass)	James Hettinga (cello)
2018	Alex Zhou (violin)	Julian Rhee (violin)	Isabelle Ai Durrenberger (violin)	Sophia Su (violin); Jean Kim (cello)	
2017	Jeremy Tai (cello)	Zhanbo Zheng (viola)	Kyumin Park (violin)		
2016	William Langlie-Miletich (double bass)	Coleman Itzkoff (cello)	Alina Kobialka (violin)	Evin Blomberg (violin)	Sarah Hall (violin)
2015	Oliver Herbert (cello)	Isabella Perron (violin)	Emily Shehi (violin)	Erika Gray (viola); Ariel Horowitz (violin)	
2014	Zlatomir Fung (cello)	Charles Seo (cello)	Angela Wee (violin)	Luke Hsu (violin); Kyumin Park (violin)	
2013	Youjin Lee (violin)	Wyatt Underhill (violin)	Dana Kelley (viola)	Brannon Cho (cello); Kevin Lin (violin)	
2012	Austin Huntington (cello)	Emma Steele (violin)	Alexandra Switala (violin)	Jean Kim (cello); Natalie Lin (violin)	
2011	Mayumi Kanagawa (violin)	Matthew Allen (cello)	Ji-Won Song (violin)	Daniel Cho (violin); Mindy Park (cello)	
2010	Francesca dePasquale (violin)	Angelo Xiang Yu (violin)	Taeguk Mun (cello)	Fabiola Kim (violin); Philip Kramp (viola)	
2009	Nikki Chooi (violin)	So Jin Kim (violin)	Meta Weiss (cello)		
2008	Tessa Lark (violin)	Robin Scott (violin)	Ying Xue (violin)	Emily Deans (viola)	Char Prescott (cello)
2007	Jing Wang (violin)	David McCarroll (violin)	Madeleine Kabat (cello)	Lydia Hong (violin)	Alice Yoo (cello)
2006	David Requiro (cello)	Yu Jin (viola)	Celeste Golden (violin)	Song-le Do (cello)	Natalia Szadkowski (violin)
2005	Mihai Marica (cello)	Tee Khoon Tang (violin)	Ilana Setapen (violin)	Katherine Eberle (violin)	Rachel Harding (violin)
2004	Jung-Min Amy Lee (violin)	David Kim (viola)	Joshua Roman (cello); Yves Dharamraj (cello) (tie)		Clara Lyon (violin)
2003	Eric Nowlin (viola)	Tao Ni (cello)	David Joshua Roman (cello)	Katie Hyun (violin)	Ayane Kozasa (violin)
2002	Min-Ji Kim (cello)	Teng Li (viola)	Caroline Campbell (violin)	Kathryn Eberle (violin)	Adam Barnett-Hart (violin)
2001	Howard Zhang (violin)	Teng Li (viola)	Eunice Keem (violin)	Yvonne Lam (violin)	Adam Barnett-Hart (violin)
2000	Angela Fuller (violin)	Yoon-Jung Cho (violin)	Jun Jensen (cello)	Yang Xu (violin)	Hannah Jin (violin)
1999	Frank Huang (violin)	Madeline Adkins (violin)	Lucia Micarelli (violin)	Cecilia Lee (cello)	John Keigwin (double bass)
1998	Denise Djokic (cello)	Patrick Jee (cello)	Christina Castelli (violin)	YonJoo Lee (violin)	Hee Guen Song (violin)
1997	Kirsten Johnson (viola)	Amy Schwartz (violin)	Vivek Kamath (viola)	Amir Eldan (cello)	Boris Tonkov (viola)
1996	Lisa Kim (violin)	Lucasz Szyrner (cello)	Alberto Parrini (cello)	Jenny Oaks (violin)	Margo Tatgenhorst (cello)
1995	Cathy Basrak (viola)	Pavel Sporcl (violin)	Ani Aznavoorian (cello)	Kirsten Johnson (viola)	Esther Noh (violin)
1994	François Salque (cello)	Nurit Pacht (violin)	Serge Oskotsky (cello)	Ayako Yoshida (violin)	
1993	Jennifer Koh (violin)	Vadim Gluzman (violin)	Julia Tom (cello)	Lara St. John (violin)	Joanna Kurkowicz (violin)
1992	Mark Kosower (cello)	Qi-Xin Pu (violin)	Lisa Lee (violin)	Owen Lee (double bass)	Annie Chang (viola)
1991	Jennifer Frautschi (violin)	Alexis Gerlach (cello)	Brent Samuel (cello)	Carol Oh (cello)	David Park (violin)
1990	Robert deMaine (cello)	Jian-Wen Tong (cello)	Joan Kwuon (violin)	Misha Keylin (violin)	
1989	Alyssa Park (violin)	Wendy Warner (cello)	Alban Gerhardt (cello)		
1988	Sang Mee Lee (cello)	Gianna Abondolo (cello)	Richard Hirschl (cello)	Eileen Moon (cello)	Anne Chalex (violin)
1987	Molly Mo-Lin Fung (violin)	Gloria Justen (violin)	Hai-Ye Ni (cello)	Robin Sharp (violin)	
1986	Stephanie Arado (violin)	Sandra Park (violin)	Sara Parker (violin)	Charles Chandler (double bass)	Timothy Landauer (cello)

== Trivia ==
In the book The Eggnog Chronicles, one fictional character is introduced as "the youngest violinist to win the Irving M. Klein String Competition."
