= Mark Kosower =

American cellist (born 1976)

- Born: Mark Kosower; December 17, 1976; Eau Claire, Wisconsin, U.S.
- Genres: Classical
- Instrument: Cello
- Label: Naxos Records

Mark Kosower (/ˈkɒsəwər/) is principal cellist of the Cleveland Orchestra. He was solo cellist of the Bamberg Symphony Orchestra in Germany from 2006 to 2010 and was professor of cello and chamber music at the San Francisco Conservatory of Music from 2005 to 2007. He was on the faculty at the Cleveland Institute of Music until his resignation in January 2020.

== Early life and education ==
Kosower is the son of Paul and Janet Kosower. His father was a professor of cello and organ and his mother was an elementary school teacher. He was born in Eau Claire, Wisconsin, and graduated from North High School there.

He was introduced to the cello at the age of one-and-a-half by his father, who continued to be his primary teacher throughout his youth. Kosower went on to study with János Starker at Indiana University and Joel Krosnick at the Juilliard School.

== Performance ==
Kosower has appeared as soloist with the symphony orchestras of Detroit, Florida, Houston, Indianapolis, Milwaukee, Minnesota, North Carolina, Oregon, Phoenix, and Seattle; the Buffalo Philharmonic Orchestra, the Ravinia Festival Orchestra, and the Saint Paul Chamber Orchestra, among others. International appearances include the Hong Kong Philharmonic Orchestra, the China National Symphony Orchestra, the National Symphony Orchestra of Taiwan, the Kansai Philharmonic, the Orchestre de Paris, the KwaZulu-Natal Philharmonic Orchestra, and the Brazilian Symphony Orchestra.

As a recitalist Kosower has performed at the John F. Kennedy Center for the Performing Arts, the Aspen Music Festival, the Philadelphia Chamber Music Society, and on the Great Performer's Series at Lincoln Center. He has also given solo performances in sat the Théâtre du Châtelet in Paris, Frankfurt's Alte Oper, the Komische Oper Berlin, the Hong Kong Cultural Centre, the Theatro Municipal in Rio de Janeiro, and in New York's Avery Fisher Hall. He has recorded for Ambitus, Delos, Naxos, and VAI including a 2011 Naxos release of the Ginastera Cello Concertos with Lothar Zagrosek and the Bamberg Symphony Orchestra.

Along with his father and sister, Kosower has toured the United States and Europe as a member of the Dolce Cello Trio.

== Awards and recognition ==
Kosower has been a top prize winner in both the Rostropovich and Pablo Casals International Cello competitions, including a special prize in both competitions for best interpretation of the newly commissioned works by Marco Stroppa and Cristóbal Halffter. He has also been the grand prize winner of both the Irving Klein International String Competition and the WAMSO Competition of the Minnesota Orchestra. In addition, Kosower has been the recipient of the Avery Fisher Career Grant and a Sony Grant.
