= Alan de Veritch =

American violist (born 1947)

Alan de Veritch (born July 18, 1947) is an American violist and viola teacher. He studied with William Primrose and performed in the Los Angeles Philharmonic for at least ten years. He has taught viola in various universities and was the president of the American Viola Society from 1990 to 1994. He played Jago peternella modern italian Viola.

== Early life and solo career ==
De Veritch's talent caught the attention of William Primrose when he was twelve after solo appearances with the Los Angeles Philharmonic, and Primrose accepted him as a student. While studying with Primrose, his career quickly took flight. At the age of 16, De Veritch tied for first place in the National String Competition in Washington, D.C., the youngest and first violist to receive that honor. In the spring of 1965, De Veritch was one of three student musicians invited to perform with Jascha Heifetz at the University of Southern California. Later that year, De Veritch enrolled at the Indiana University School of Music and was featured as a soloist with the University Concert Orchestra in October. He soloed with the Pasadena Symphony in the spring of 1966, and at the Albuquerque June Music Festival. In 1969, De Veritch was named a winner at the Emma Feldman National String Competition—again the first violist to receive such an honor. De Veritch was a featured soloist with the Los Angeles Philharmonic 1972 1975, and 1976. De Veritch worked closely with the American Viola Society for many years and was a guest performer at the 1989 XVII International Viola Congress.

== Chamber & orchestra involvement ==
While maintaining a solo career, De Veritch was also a member of different orchestras throughout his life. He joined the Los Angeles Philharmonic in 1970 as assistant principal violist, and went on to serve ten years as principal violist under Zubin Mehta and Carlo Maria Giulini. De Veritch has participated extensively in chamber music performances with "greats" including Josef Gingold and Ralph Berkowitz. He served as the principal violist in the United States Marine Orchestra, and in 1975 was a member of the Miraflores Trio. de Veritch has also performed with the New York Philharmonic, Sunset Chamber Consort, An die Musik, and the Aldanya String Quartet. He was the founder and member of the White House String Quartet.

== Teaching & recording career ==
De Veritch has taught many of the world's leading violists including Paul Neubauer, James Dunham, and Nokuthula Ngwenyama. He was a member of the string faculty at the University of California for several years, and acted as the head of the viola department of the California Institute of the Arts, and taught at Indiana University's Jacobs School of Music until the spring of 2012. He served as the president of the American Viola Society from 1990 to 1994. He has also recorded for hundreds of motion picture soundtracks, as well as producing his own recordings of standard viola repertoire. In addition, he authored a book entitled The Art of Sensuality and its Impact on Great String Playing.
