= Rosemary Glyde =

American musician (1948–1994)

- Born: September 15, 1948; Auburn, Alabama, USA
- Died: January 18, 1994 (aged 45); Mount Kisco, New York, USA
- Other name: Rosemary Glyde Shumsky
- Occupations: Violist, composer

Rosemary Glyde (September 15, 1948 – January 18, 1994) was an American violist and composer. Focusing on expanding the limited repertory for solo viola, she wrote and transcribed many works for that instrument, including Sergei Rachmaninoff's Cello Sonata and Johann Sebastian Bach's Cello Suites for viola. She founded the New York Viola Society in 1992.

Glyde was born in Auburn, Alabama, in 1948 to Edgar Glyde, a violist on faculty at the Alabama Polytechnic Institute, and Dorothy Glyde, a cellist. Glyde was trained as soprano and violinist, studying under her father, a graduate of the Royal Academy of Music, from the age of four. While a student at Auburn High School, she was concert mistress of the Sewanee Summer Music Center Orchestra, studying with Julius Hegyi. Before her graduation from Auburn High in 1966, she was offered a scholarship to The Hartt School to train under Raphael Bronstein, with whom she continued training at the Manhattan School of Music. She began her master's work at the Juilliard School under Dorothy DeLay, but switched to viola and moved into the doctoral program studying with Lillian Fuchs. Glyde won the Juilliard Viola Competition in 1973 and, for her thesis, discovered, edited, and performed Johann Andreas Amon's 1803 Quartet for Solo Viola and String Trio. She graduated with a Doctor in Musical Arts from the Juilliard School, a Master of Music from the Juilliard School and a Bachelor of Music from the Manhattan School of Music.

After graduation, Glyde joined the Manhattan String Quartet with her sister, Judith, and Eric and Roy Lewis. Glyde arranged Sergei Rachmaninoff's Cello Sonata in G minor and Johann Sebastian Bach's Six Suites for Unaccompanied Cello and Sonatas for viola da gamba for viola, the latter two of which she performed and recorded. She composed several works for viola, notably a fantasia for solo viola, Whydah, and a suite for four violas, Wei-ji. She performed several works composed specifically for her, including works by composers Richard Lane, Bernard Hoffer, and Judith Shatin. Glyde founded the New York Viola Society in 1992 and served as that institution's first president.

Glyde died on January 18, 1994, due to cancer in Mount Kisco, New York. The New York Viola Society awards a "Rosemary Glyde Scholarship" to students for viola study in her honor.
