= Viola Concerto (Piston) =

1957 Viola Concerto by Walter Piston

The Concerto for Viola and Orchestra is a musical composition for viola and orchestra by the American composer Walter Piston. The work was written in 1957 for the violist Joseph de Pasquale, who first performed the piece with the Boston Symphony Orchestra on March 7, 1958.

== Music ==
The concerto has a duration of roughly 20 minutes and is cast in three movements:

1. Con moto moderato e flessible
2. Adagio con fantasia
3. Allegro vivo

It is scored for a solo viola and an orchestra consisting of a piccolo, two flutes, two oboes, cor anglais, two clarinets, bass clarinet, two bassoons, contrabassoon, four horns, two trumpets, three trombones, tuba, timpani, percussion, harp, and strings.

== Reception ==
The music critic Andrew Farach-Colton of Gramophone wrote, "Piston's Concerto (1957) opens pensively, quickly builds to an aching climax (beginning around 4'00") with the first movement ending almost abruptly on a note of resignation. The central Adagio con fantasia is the work's emotional core, beginning in abject loneliness (sparely scored with wistful harmonies) but finds, in the final pages, a sweeter lyricism that prepares the listener perfectly for the playful syncopations of the exuberant finale." Anthony Tommasini of The New York Times similarly observed:

The concerto, 25 minutes long, begins with a slow introduction in which the meditative viola wanders searchingly over clear-voiced modal harmonies in the orchestra. The intensity builds but never becomes overwrought. When the tempo picks up, those ruminative motifs become building blocks for intricate interplay with the orchestra. Yet the expressive gesture is always paramount, even when the full orchestra sounds a brassy statement of that initial searching theme. The soulful second movement has a neo-Romantic quality, but the viola melody, enshrouded by muted strings, keeps breaking into restless, harmonically astringent digressions. The finale begins with fanfares in the trumpets and horns, then sets off like some spirited rondo. Yet even here, a restrained quality in the music never lets the mood become too festive. Piston keeps you on guard with metric shifts and episodes of insistent counterpoint.
