= Geraldine Walther =

American violist (born 1950)

- Born: 22 July 1950 (age 76); Tampa, Florida
- Education: Manhattan School of Music
- Occupation: violist

Geraldine Lamboley Walther (born July 22, 1950) is an American violist. From 2005 to May 2020 she was a member of the Takács Quartet. During this time she also taught at the University of Colorado Boulder. She was also the principal violist of the San Francisco Symphony, a role she held from 1976 through 2005. Previously, she was assistant principal viola of the Pittsburgh Symphony Orchestra, Baltimore Symphony Orchestra and the Miami Philharmonic. In 1979, she won the First Prize at the Primrose International Viola Competition.

== About ==
Before joining the Takács Quartet at the University of Colorado, Geraldine Walther was Principal Violist of the San Francisco Symphony for 29 years. Early in her career she served as assistant principal of the Pittsburgh Symphony, the Miami Philharmonic, and the Baltimore Symphony. She studied at the Manhattan School of Music with Lillian Fuchs, at the Curtis Institute with Michael Tree of the Guarneri Quartet, and in 1979 she won first prize at the William Primrose International Competition. She had been on the music faculty of The San Francisco Conservatory, Notre Dame de Namur University, and Mills College and conducted master classes at numerous universities and festivals.

She has performed as soloist on numerous occasions with the San Francisco Symphony and given the US premieres of Michael Tippett's Triple Concerto in 1981, Tōru Takemitsu's A String Around Autumn in 1990, Peter Lieberson's Viola Concerto in 1999, George Benjamin's Viola, Viola (together with SFS Associate Principal Violist Yun Jie Liu), also in 1999, and the Viola Concerto by Robin Holloway.

In 1995 Ms. Walther was selected by Sir Georg Solti as a member of his Musicians of the World, which performed in Geneva to celebrate the 50th anniversary of the United Nations in July 1995. She has also served as principal violist with the Mainly Mozart Festival in San Diego. An avid chamber musician, Ms. Walther regularly participates in leading chamber music festivals, including Marlboro, Santa Fe, Tanglewood, Bridgehampton, and, most recently, the Telluride, Seattle, and Ruby Mountain festivals, Music at Kohl Mansion, Green Music Festival in Sonoma, and the inaugural season of Music@Menlo. She has collaborated with such artists as Isaac Stern, Pinchas Zukerman, and Jaime Laredo, and appeared as a guest artist with the Vermeer, Guarneri, Lindsay, Cypress, Tokyo and St. Lawrence quartets.

Geraldine Walther's recordings include Paul Hindemith's Trauermusik and Der Schwanendreher with the San Francisco Symphony (both on London/Decca), Paul Chihara's Golden Slumbers with the San Francisco Chamber Singers (Albany), and Lou Harrison's Threnody (New Albion). In 2003, she recorded, with SFS Assistant Concertmaster Mark Volkert and cellist Jan Volkert, a disc of Mr. Volkert's transcriptions for string trio entitled Delectable Pieces. In 2013, she released a CD of the music of Johannes Brahms, which includes the two viola sonata (F minor and E-flat major) and the Trio in A minor for Viola, Violoncello and Piano.
