= Scott Slapin =

American composer and violinist (born 1974)

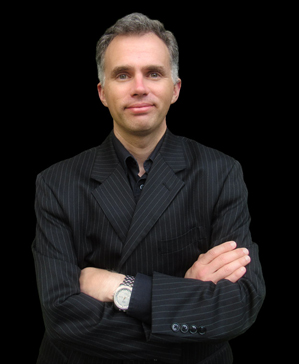
Slapin, c. 2018

Scott Slapin (born May 18, 1974) is an American composer and violist. Slapin began his composing career during his adolescence. In later years, he has performed as a viola soloist, with his wife in a duo, and as a member of several symphonic and chamber orchestras. Slapin has composed more than eighty works, including the required piece for the 2008 Primrose International Viola Competition. He played at the 36th and 38th International Viola Congresses. In 2008, he and his wife won the Best Chamber Performance award at the Tribute to the Classical Arts in New Orleans.

== Early life and education ==
Slapin was born on May 18, 1974. Both his parents were musicians; his mother played the cello, his father played bass instruments. Slapin grew up in Lebanon Township, New Jersey. He began studying music when he was 6. Initially, he played the violin but switched to the viola. His first music teacher was Barbara Barstow, who later served as the artistic director of the New Jersey Youth Symphony.

Slapin attended a music high school in North Carolina and was accepted at the Manhattan School of Music two years before finishing high school. He graduated from the conservatory aged 17 where he studied under Emanuel Vardi.

== Career ==
Slapin was a member of the New Jersey Youth Symphony from the age of 9. When he was 13, he composed an opera that was included in a New Jersey Philharmonic Orchestra program. His composition, Funeral Music, was performed by the Brunswick Symphony Orchestra in New Brunswick when he was 14. The New Jersey Star Ledger described it as "quite sophisticated".

When he was 18, Slapin was performing daily as the solo violist in the New York City production of Gerald Busby's Orpheus in Love, a chamber opera about Orpheus reborn as a viola player. There, he became friends with the composer Richard Lane.

Slapin was subsequently invited to premiere Busby's Muse for solo viola at Carnegie Hall's Weill Recital Hall. Slapin also performed solo recitals and with ensembles in the United States and South America. He has composed for the Penn State Viola Ensemble, the Wistaria String Quartet, and is a former fellow at the Montalvo Arts Center in California. He plays solo Bach, Paganini Caprices, and his own compositions on various soundtracks for film and TV.

Slapin has composed more than eighty works. He was commissioned to write the required piece for the 2008 Primrose International Viola Competition. He served on the committee for the first Maurice Gardner Composition Competition and co-premiered the winning work, Rachel Matthews' Dreams, at the 38th International Viola Congress. Slapin plays a viola built by Hiroshi Iizuka.

== Slapin-Solomon Viola Duo ==
The Slapin-Solomon Viola Duo is a musical group consisting of violists Scott Slapin and Tanya Solomon. The duo has performed throughout the US and internationally and released more than 20 albums. Notable composers have written specifically for the ensemble, who have expanded the repertoire for two violas. The husband and wife pair have been married since about 2003. They play together as a duo, as soloists, and also in symphony orchestras.

The duo has performed throughout the US and internationally. Slapin and Solomon have given duo performances at international viola congresses and also shared a stand in many chamber and symphonic ensembles. Composers Gerald Busby, Patrick Neher, Richard Lane, Rachel Matthews, Frank Proto, and David Rimelis have written for the ensemble. The duo has also premiered and recorded thirty of Slapin's own compositions, many of which reference Cremonus.

Slapin plays a viola by Hiroshi Iizuka, and Solomon plays a viola by Marten Cornelissen.

The husband and wife pair have been married since about 2003. They play together as a duo, as soloists, and also in symphony orchestras. In 2005, the pair, who were based in New Orleans, found themselves on the road and sleeping on friends' couches for six months following Hurricane Katrina.

In September 2005, the duo played a benefit concert with the New Jersey Youth Symphony at the Church of the Redeemer in Morristown to aid the Gulf Coast Orchestra Relief Fund (New Orleans Philharmonic Orchestra) and the Greater New Orleans Youth Orchestra. In 2006, they released an album Recital on the Road: What We Did On Our Summer Evacuation which included the music they played in the months following Hurricane Katrina.The duo won the Best Chamber Music Performance award at the 2008 New Orleans Tribute to the Classical Arts.

In 2008, they played at the 36th International Viola Congress. In 2013, the duo played at Valley Classics "A MUSEical Journey: Adventures in Composition," performing Slapin's own "Nocturne", David Rimelis' "A Day in Acadia" and the world premiere of Patrick Neher's "Games".

In 2023, the duo released a 20-year retrospective album.

== Solo recordings ==
Slapin's chamber music has been recorded by the Wistaria String Quartet, the Penn State Viola Ensemble, the American Viola Quartet, and the Slapin-Solomon Viola Duo. Slapin was the first person to record the complete cycle of Bach's Sonatas and Partitas (originally for violin) on viola, a set which he re-recorded in 2006. He has premiered and recorded many 20th and 21st-century works for the viola, and he is the soloist on the first album produced by the American Viola Society. His 2008 recording of his viola arrangement of the 24 Caprices by Niccolò Paganini was the first made on a viola in standard tuning since Emanuel Vardi in 1965.

== Duo recordings ==
- 2000 Sonatas by Lane, Leclair and Handel
- 2005 Sketches from the New World: American Viola Duos in the 21st Century
- 2006 Recital on the Road: What We Did On Our Summer Evacuation
- 2007 Reflection: Violacentric Chamber Music of Scott Slapin
- 2012 All Viola, All the Time: Music for Multiple Violas by Scott Slapin
- 2012 Music for Friends, Two (Music by Patrick Neher)
- 2013 Three Moods for Two Violas (Bob Cobert)
- 2015 Violacentrism: The Opera
- 2016 Violacentric Sonatas
- 2016 A Fifth of Slapin: All You Need is Viola (or Two)
- 2016 3 Excursions for 2 Violas (Music by David Rimelis)
- 2017 Symphonic Masterworks (Music by Beethoven, Rossini, Tchaikovsky, and Wagner)
- 2019 Short Stories: Original Music by Scott Slapin
- 2020 Concerto for Two Violas by Scott Slapin
- 2022 The Slapin Anthology
- 2023 The Slapin-Solomon Viola Duo: A Twenty-Year Retrospective

== Tributes ==
In memory of his teacher, Vardi, Slapin wrote Capricious, a viola trio which references several of Paganini's Caprices. Slapin's Nocturne is also dedicated to his composition teacher and mentor Richard Lane and can be heard, along with Slapin's Elegy-Caprice, in the final scenes of the American docudrama Secret Life, Secret Death. Slapin performed his Trauermusik at the memorial concert for his first violin and viola teacher, Barbara Barstow.

== Selected works ==
- Ballade (for viola duo)
- Capricious (for viola trio)
- Concerto for Two Violas
- Elegy (for two violas and doublebass)
- Elegy-Caprice (for solo viola)
- Fanfare (for an Old Library, for viola duo)
- The Four Seasons of New England (for viola quartet)
- The Hassid & The Hayseed (for viola and cello, from Triptych)
- Nocturne (for viola duo)
- Postlude (for solo viola and string orchestra)
- Prelude (for viola duo)
- Recitative – Commissioned for the 2008 Primrose International Viola Competition (for solo viola)
- Sketches (for viola quartet)
- Soliloquy (for solo viola)
- Sonata in C (for viola duo)
- Sonatina (for viola duo)
- Suite (in versions for viola duo or solo viola with viola ensemble)
- Violacentrism, The Opera (for viola duo)
