= Pacifica Quartet =

String instrument quartet

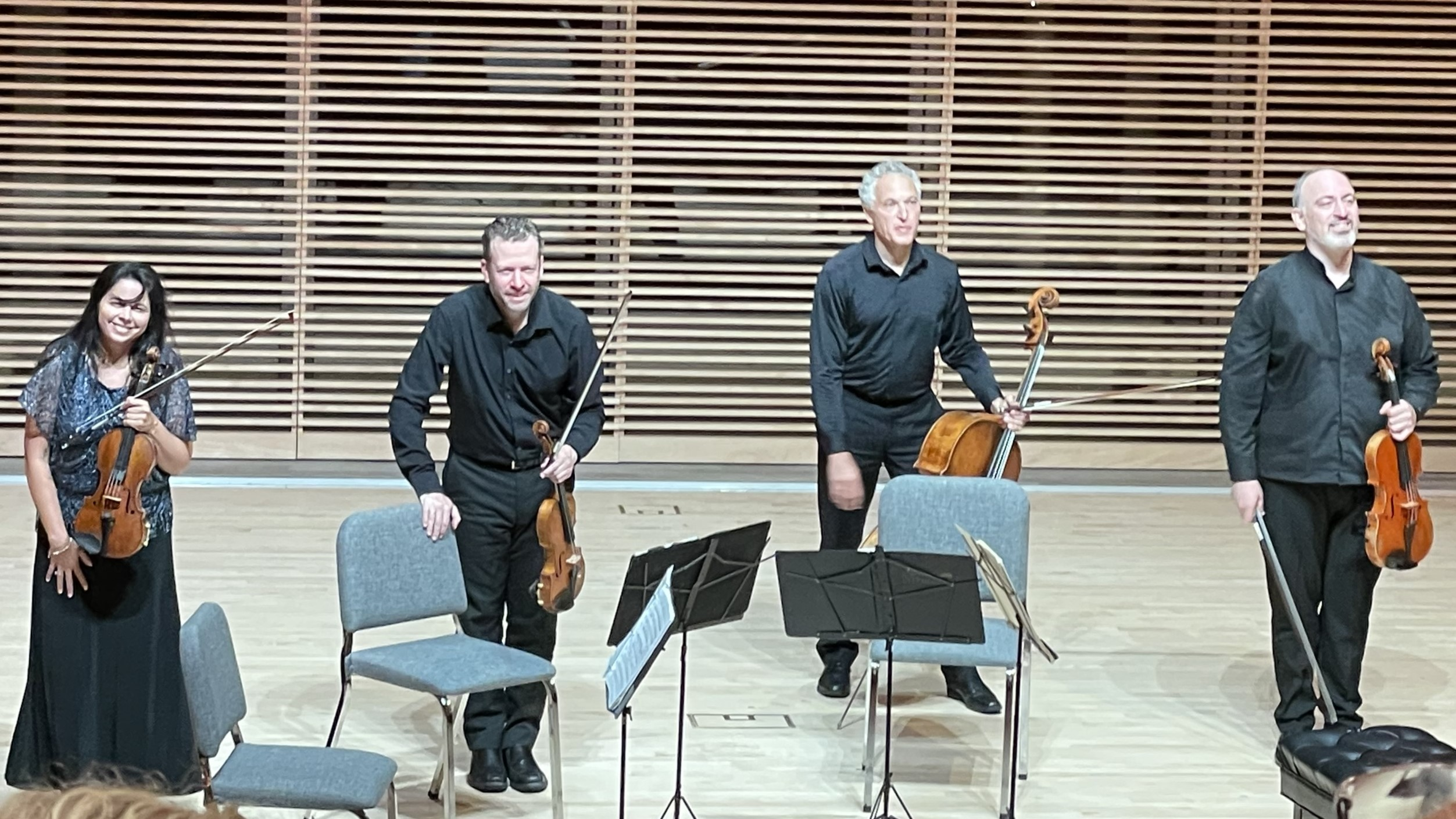
- The Pacifica Quartet at Tanglewood in 2023

Background information
- Also known as: Pacifica String Quartet
- Origin: Bloomington, Indiana, United States
- Genre: Classical
- Occupation: String quartet
- Instruments: 2 violins, 1 viola, 1 cello
- Years active: 1994–present
- Members: Simin Ganatra; Austin Hartman; Mark Holloway; Brandon Vamos
- Website: www.pacificaquartet.com

The Pacifica Quartet is a professional string quartet based in Bloomington, Indiana. Its members are: Simin Ganatra, first violin; Austin Hartman, second violin; Mark Holloway, viola; and Brandon Vamos, cello. Formed in 1994 by Ganatra and Vamos with violinist Sibbi Bernhardsson and violist Kathryn Lockwood, the group won prizes in competitions such as the 1996 Coleman Chamber Music Competition, the 1997 Concert Artists Guild Competition, and the 1998 Naumburg Chamber Music Competition. In 2001, violist Masumi Per Rostad replaced Lockwood. The group subsequently received Chamber Music America's prestigious Cleveland Quartet Award in 2002, the Avery Fisher Career Grant in 2006, and was named "Ensemble of the Year" by Musical America in 2009. In 2017, violinist Austin Hartman replaced Bernhardsson and violist Guy Ben-Ziony replaced Rostad.

The Pacifica Quartet tours throughout the Americas, Europe, and Asia. The ensemble is known for its traversal of the complete string cycles of a single composer, and in recent years have toured and recorded the quartets of Elliott Carter, Mendelssohn, Beethoven and Shostakovich.

Currently the ensemble serves as Quartet-in-Residence and full-time faculty at the Jacobs School of Music at Indiana University in Bloomington. The members of the Pacifica Quartet are also Resident Performing Artists at the University of Chicago and were previously the Quartet-in-Residence at the University of Illinois School of Music from 2003 to 2012.

== History ==
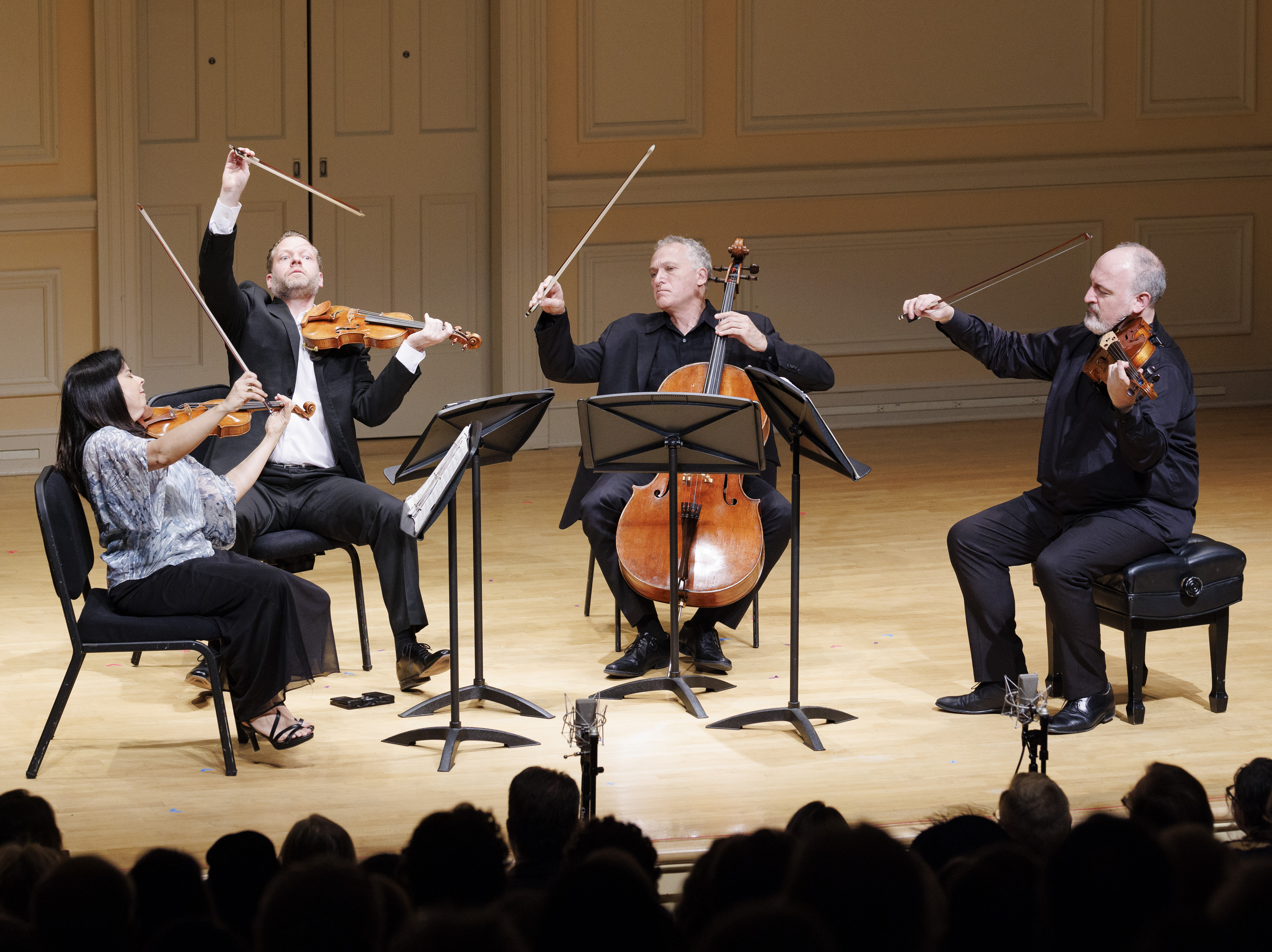
The Pacifica Quartet performs in 2024 at the Library of Congress

The quartet was conceived at the Music Academy of the West Summer School in Montecito, California, when fellow students, violist Kathryn Lockwood and violinist Josefina Vergara, decided they would create a string quartet for the sake of entering a competition in the Los Angeles area. Vergara invited Simin Ganatra, originally from southern California but still a student in Oberlin, Ohio, and filled in the application with the name, "Pacifica Quartet", having yet to hold a single rehearsal. The name came from the ocean within view of the Music Academy. Ganatra invited cellist Brandon Vamos, who was finishing graduate school in New Haven, Connecticut, resulting in a part-time, cross-country commitment. Within a year, the group went full-time when they all moved from their respective locations to the Chicago area for post-graduate study, although Vergara soon returned to California and was eventually replaced by Sibbi Bernhardsson, establishing the first long-term iteration of the quartet. Ganatra and Sibbi Bernhardsson had both been students of well-known pedagogues Roland and Almita Vamos, whose son is Brandon Vamos, Bernhardsson having come from Iceland to study with the Vamoses. In 1997, Bernhardsson collaborated with violist Masumi Per Rostad at Yale School of Music's Norfolk Chamber Music Festival. Rostad was subsequently invited to join the Pacifica Quartet a few years later, shortly after Lockwood's departure in 2001. At the end of the 2016–2017 season, Austin Hartman replaced Bernhardsson and Guy Ben-Ziony replaced Rostad.

== Members ==
- Simin Ganatra, violin
- Austin Hartman, violin
- Mark Holloway, viola
- Brandon Vamos, cello

== Residencies ==
- Indiana University Jacob's School of Music, Quartet-in-residence and full-time faculty members, Fall 2012 – present
- University of Chicago, Artist-in-Residence of Contempo, 1999 to present
- The Metropolitan Museum of Art in NY, Quartet-in-Residence, 2009-2012
- University of Illinois at Champaign-Urbana, Quartet-in-residence, 2003-2012
- The Longy School in Cambridge, MA, Visiting Artists in Chamber Music, 2006-2009

== Exploration of complete string quartet cycles ==
The Pacifica Quartet gained international recognition as an interpreter of string quartet cycles. They have given performances of the Pulitzer Prize-winning composer Elliott Carter's cycle in San Francisco, New York, Chicago, Houston, Los Angeles, Tokyo, Edinburgh and London; the Mendelssohn cycle in Atherton, Pittsburgh, as well as cities in Australia and Germany; and the Beethoven cycle in New York, Denver, St. Paul, Chicago, Napa, and Tokyo (in a presentation of five concerts in three days at Suntory Hall). The Quartet presented the complete cycle of fifteen quartets by Dmitri Shostakovich in Chicago and New York during the 2010–2011 season and in Montreal and at London's Wigmore Hall in the 2011–2012 season.

- Volumes III and IV of the complete string cycle of Dmitri Shostakovich released: 2013
- Volumes I and II of the complete string cycle of Dmitri Shostakovich released: 2011 & 2012
- Performs the complete Shostakovich string quartet cycle during the Soviet Experience festival in Chicago and at The Metropolitan Museum of Art in New York: 2010-2011
- Volumes I and II of the complete string quartets by Elliott Carter on Cedille Records released: 2008-2009
- First Australian tour, Mendelssohn cycle: 2008-2009
- Beethoven cycle tour: 2007-2008
- Complete Mendelssohn string quartets released on Cedille Records: 2005
- Elliott Carter's string quartet cycle, first world tour: 2002/03

== Premieres and new commissioning projects ==
- "Dooryard Bloom" by Jennifer Higdon. To be premiered February 19, 2013 with Nathan and Julie Gunn at the Carnegie Hall.
- "Return" by Keeril Makan, premiered October 24, 2012, co-commissioned by the Celebrity Series of Boston and the Great Lakes Chamber Music Festival.
- "String Quartet" by Eric Brinkmann, premiered May 14, 2010 with Contempo at the University of Chicago
- "Quintet for Alto Saxophone and String Quartet" by Ellen Taaffe Zwilich, premiered with Ashu in December 2009. Commissioned by the Arizona Friends of Chamber Music.
- "Redemption: Book I" by Christos Hatzis, premiered October 2009 at City Music Cleveland.
- Piece by Alex Berezowky, premiered May 28, 2009 with Contempo at the University of Chicago
- "Distant Glimmerings" by Steve Winfield, premiered May 28, 2009 with Contempo at the University of Chicago
- "Fantasia Sobre 'Soledad'" by Andrews Carrizo, premiered May 28, 2009 with Contempo at the University of Chicago
- "Midair" by Takuma Tanikawa, premiered May 15, 2009 with Contempo at the University of Chicago
- "Time and the Bell…" by Gerald Levinson, received Chicago premiere on October 4, 2008 with Contempo at the University of Chicago
- "Quasi Sinfonia" by David M. Gordon, premiered on May 23, 2008 with Contempo at the University of Chicago
- "String Quartet No. 1" by Füsun Köksal, premiered on May 23, 2008 with Contempo at the University of Chicago
- "Electric Pastoral" by Simon Fink, premiered on May 9, 2008 with Contempo at the University of Chicago
- "Nekudot for String Sextet" by Josef Bardanashvili, premiered on April 7, 2007 with Contempo at the University of Chicago
- "Oasis for String Quartet and Tape" by Franghiz Ali-Zadeh, received Chicago premiere on February 2, 2007 with Contempo at the University of Chicago
- "Metamorphoses for Viola and Piano" by Josef Bardanashvili, received Chicago premiere on February 2, 2007 with Contempo at the University of Chicago
- "Minyo" by Kotoka Suzuki, received Chicago premiere on February 2, 2007 with Contempo at the University of Chicago
- "Power Chords" by Dmitri Tymoczko, premiered in 2006 with Cleveland contemporary youth orchestra.
- "Changing Lanes for String Quartet and Electronics" by Krzysztof Wolek, premiered May 17, 2005 with Contempo at the University of Chicago
- "Awakening Captive for Solo Piano, Soprano, 14 Players and Computer" by William Coble, premiered May 17, 2005 with Contempo at the University of Chicago
- "Afterglow – String Quartet No. 3" by Yao Chen, premiered May 3, 2005 with Contempo at the University of Chicago
- "Celebrations for Piano and Chamber Orchestra" by John Austin, premiered January 23, 2005 with Contempo at the University of Chicago
- "Quartet No. 5" by Ezra Sims, premiered November 2003, commissioned by Arizona Friends of Chamber Music.
- "Mosaics" by Marta Ptaszynska, premiered July 2002, commissioned by Caramoor International Music Festival.
- "Piano Quintet, 'Tableau Funebres'" by Claude Baker, premiered March 2003 with Ursula Oppens, commissioned by Louisville Chamber Music Society.
- Julia Hemphill: "One Atmosphere for piano and string quartet" by Julia Hemphill, premiere recording in 2003
- "String Quartets" by Easley Blackwood, premiere recording release on Cedille Records in 1999.

== Discography ==
- Contemporary Voices, Cedille Records, 2021. With Otis Murphy, alto saxophone. 2021 GRAMMY Award Winner for Best Chamber Music/Small Ensemble Performance.
- Souvenirs of Spain and Italy, Cedille Records, 2019. With Sharon Isbin, guitar.
- Brahms Piano Quintet Op. 34, Schumann String Quartet No. 1 Op. 41, Cedille Records, 2017. With Menahem Pressler, piano.
- Mozart & Brahms Clarinet Quintets (K. 581 & Op. 115), Cedille Records, 2014. With Anthony McGill, clarinet.
- The Soviet Experience Box Set, Cedille Records, 2014 (Collection of Vol. 1-4 in a box)
- The Soviet Experience: Shostakovich & Contemporaries, Vol. 4, Cedille Records, 2013
- The Soviet Experience: Shostakovich & Contemporaries, Vol. 3, Cedille Records, 2013
- The Soviet Experience: Shostakovich & Contemporaries, Vol. 2, Cedille Records, 2012
- The Soviet Experience: Shostakovich & Contemporaries, Vol. 1, Cedille Records, 2011
- Elliott Carter String Quartets 2, 3 & 4, Naxos, 2009
- Elliott Carter String Quartets 1 & 5, Naxos, 2008 2009 GRAMMY Award winner for Best Chamber Music Performance.
- Mendelssohn: The Complete String Quartets, Cedille Records, 2005
- Declarations: Music Between the Wars, Cedille Records, 2006
- Julius Hemphill: One Atmosphere, Tzadik, 2003
- Dvořák: Quartet, Op. 106, Quintet, Op. 97, Cedille Records, 2002 With Michael Tree, viola.
- String Quartets by Easley Blackwood, Cedille Records, 1999

== Special projects ==
=== The Soviet Experience ===
"The Soviet Experience" was a fourteen-month-long multidisciplinary festival that took place in Chicago, IL during the 2010/11 season. Spearheaded by Shauna Quill, Executive Director of University of Chicago Presents, the festival was inspired by the Pacifica Quartet's plan to perform all fifteen of Dmitri Shostakovich's string quartets in Chicago, the first time the city hosted the entire cycle. Eleven different institutions collaborated to present works by visual artists, choreographers, composers, and dramatists who lived under the Politburo of the Soviet Union in more than 48 events in a dozen venues across Chicago, making it one of the largest inter-disciplinary collaborative efforts in Chicago since the Silk Road Chicago project in 2006/07. In addition to five concerts during the season, the Pacifica Quartet gave master classes and free noon-time lecture demonstrations throughout the festival.

== Awards and recognition ==
- Grammy Award, 2021, Best Chamber Music/Small Ensemble Performance for "Contemporary Voices"
- Named Ensemble of the Year by Musical America: 2009
- Grammy Award for Best Chamber Music Performance (Carter's Quartets Nos. 1 & 5): 2009
- Avery Fisher Career Grant: 2006
- Cover of Gramophone magazine, “Five new quartets you should know about”: 2005
- Chamber Music America's Cleveland Quartet Award: 2002
- Appointed members of Lincoln Center's CMS Two: 2002
- Naumburg Chamber Music Award: 1998
- Concerts Guilds Competition:1997

== Publications ==
- Per Rostad, Masumi, “My Viola is a Porsche-More or Less,” Strings November 2011.
- Per Rostad, Masumi, “The Challenges and Joys of Quartet Playing," Gramophone, October 26, 2010.
- Per Rostad, Masumi, “Mortality and Meaning of Beethoven’s Late Quartet, Op. 132," Strings, May 2009.
- Vamos, Brandon, “Never Too Late,” Gramophone, March 2009

== Podcasts ==
In 2011, WGBH radio in Boston began hosting violist Masumi Per Rostad's podcast series Inner Voice. Often recorded in the various locales where chamber music is performed, the program features behind-the-scenes conversations with fellow musicians and other figures in the classical music world, and explores the experience of touring as a contemporary chamber musician.
