= Peter Slowik =

- Born: 1957 (age 68–69); Oak Park, Illinois, U.S.
- Genre: Classical
- Instruments: Viola

Academic background
- Education: New England Conservatory of Music (BM); University of Rochester (MM)

Peter Slowik (born 1957) is an American classical musician and academic working as a professor of viola and head of the string department at Oberlin Conservatory of Music.

== Early life and education ==
Slowik was born in Oak Park, Illinois. He earned a Bachelor of Music degree from the New England Conservatory of Music and a Master of Music from the Eastman School of Music.

== Career ==
Before teaching at Oberlin, Slowik taught at the Cleveland Institute of Music, Northwestern University (where he earned the McCormick Professorship for Teaching Excellence), and Wheaton College as a guest lecturer and viola instructor. He has received awards in teaching excellence from Oberlin, Northwestern, and the American Viola Society. Some of his former viola students perform in major U.S. orchestras such as the Chicago Symphony Orchestra, the Minnesota Orchestra, the San Francisco Symphony, and the National Symphony Orchestra, and in university appointments across the nation.

Slowik is a former substitute violist for the Chicago Symphony Orchestra, and appeared as an onstage solo violist at the Lyric Opera of Chicago. Slowik is also currently the artistic director of Credo Chamber Music, a faith-based summer music program that allows gifted youths to experience intensive chamber music instruction, master classes, and performances.His teaching style is notable for its deeply empathic approach and high standards.

Slowik has been featured at six International Viola Congresses and on NPR. He was the principal violist of the American Sinfonietta, Concertante di Chicago, and the Smithsonian Chamber Orchestra.
