= Maxim Rysanov =

Ukrainian violist and conductor (born 1978)

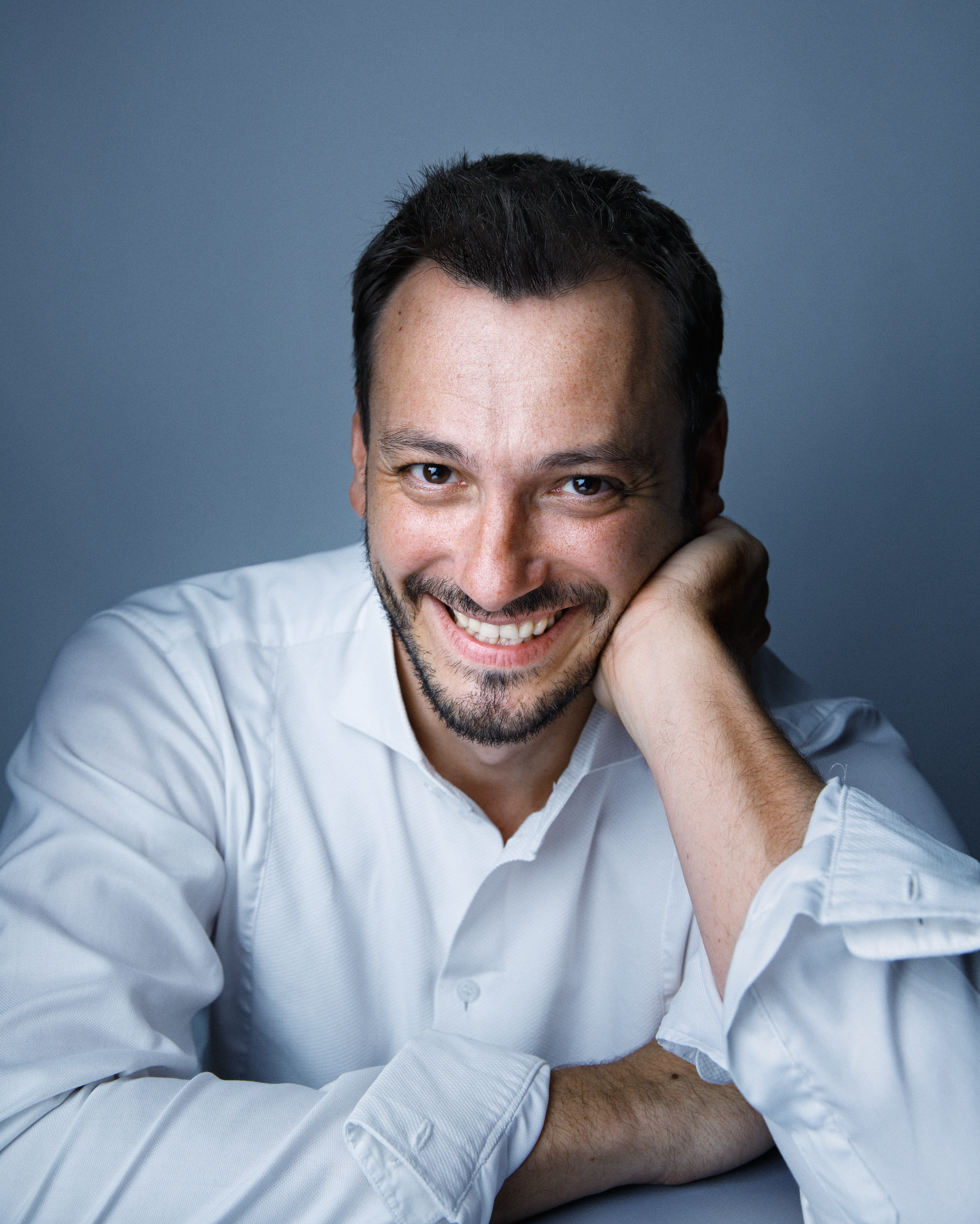
- Maxim Rysanov, 2022

Background information
- Born: 1978 (age 47–48); Kramatorsk, Ukraine
- Genre: Classical music
- Instruments: Viola and Conductor
- Spouse: Dóra Kokas (m. 2019)

Maxim Rysanov (born 1978) is a Ukrainian violist and conductor.

Rysanov was born in Kramatorsk, and studied at the Central Special Music School in Moscow and later at the Guildhall School of Music and Drama in London. In 2000 he won the Gold Medal of the Guildhall School of Music and Drama.

Rysanov won the Gramophone Award as Young Artist of the Year in 2008 and was a BBC New Generation Artist from 2007 to 2009. He is also a laureate of the Geneva (2005), Lionel Tertis (2003), and Valentino Bucchi (1995) competitions.

As a soloist, Rysanov has worked with orchestras and conductors world-wide.

Rysanov performed his own transcription of Tchaikovsky's Variations on a Rococo Theme, Op. 33, at the last night of the BBC Proms in 2010.

Rysanov has recorded and released many albums of music featuring the viola. His first three releases all gained a Gramophone Editor's Choice award. His recording with the Swedish Chamber Orchestra and Muhai Tang on BIS Records (released in September 2011) was declared Editors Choice of the month in The Strad and received a 5-star review in the Daily Telegraph.

Three CDs of Beethoven and Brahms on the Onyx label, including some transcription for the viola, with Kristina Blaumane (cello) and Jacob Katsnelson (piano), have received positive review.

Rysanov plays an instrument by Giuseppe Guadagnini (son of Giovanni Battista Guadagnini), made in 1780, known as 'Il Soldato' on private loan that was kindly arranged by Premiere Performances Hong Kong.
