= Margaret Jones Wiles =

American composer, conductor and violinist (1911 - 2000)

Margaret Isobel Jones Wiles (Dec 25, 1911 – Jul 6, 2000) was an American composer, conductor, and teacher who played violin and viola with several orchestras and composed over 50 string quartets. She received a B. Mus. from DePauw University in Indiana. Wiles also studied with Arthur Catterall at the Royal Academy of Music in London, and with Raphael Bronstein at New York College. In 1934 she moved to South Africa to marry Gordon Wiles, whom she had met while studying violin in London. Margaret and Gordon had two sons, Peter and John.

Wiles played violin with the Durban Symphony Orchestra from 1941 to 1945. For 15 years, she gave solo recitals live and on South African radio. From 1945 to 1951, she was the concertmistress of the Pietermaritzburg Symphony. After returning to the United States in 1957, she became the assistant concertmistress of the Eastern Connecticut Symphony Orchestra. She also founded and conducted the Connecticut College Orchestra. She taught violin and viola at Connecticut College and at her home.
