= American Viola Society =

The American Viola Society (AVS) is an organization headquartered in Dallas, Texas that encourages excellence in performance, pedagogy, research, composition, and lutherie by fostering communication and friendship among violists of all skill levels, ages, nationalities, and backgrounds.

The American Viola Society offers a variety of services to its members and violists worldwide, including the Primrose International Viola Competition, the Gardner Composition Competition, and the Dalton Research Competition; publications, including the Journal of the American Viola Society, the AVS Studio Blog, Teacher's Toolbox, and score downloads; a Viola Bank offering loans of instruments; and a National Teacher Directory. The society has regularly hosted International Viola Congresses as well as American Viola Society Festivals.

== History ==
In 1971, Myron Rosenblum founded the American Viola Research Society, a subset of the Viola-Forschungsgellschaft, now the International Viola Society (IVS). The organization changed its name in 1978 to the American Viola Society to better reflect the interests of its members. In 1979, David Dalton founded the Primrose International Viola Competition in honor of the violist William Primrose. That same year, the American Viola Society co-commissioned George Rochberg's Viola Sonata in celebration of Primrose's seventy-fifth birthday.

In 1985, the AVS began publishing the Journal of the American Viola Society (JAVS), an outgrowth of the AVS Newsletter that it had previously produced. The JAVS has been a leading source of viola research; notably publishing several articles on the genesis and revision of Béla Bartók's Viola Concerto. Upon retirement of Dalton as longtime editor in 1999, JAVS established the David Dalton Viola Research Competition for student members of the society.

== Primrose International Viola Competition ==
The Primrose International Viola Competition (PIVC) is an international music competition for viola players sponsored by the American Viola Society and named for the violist William Primrose. The PIVC has been held regularly since 1987, often in conjunction with biennial meetings of the North American Viola Congress. Eligible participants are 29 years and younger of any nationality. The competition involves three rounds during a week-long festival in which entrants perform a required work as well as several choices from a viola repertoire list that includes solo works, sonatas, concertos and transcriptions by Primrose.

== Maurice Gardner Composition Competition ==
The AVS inaugurated the biennial Maurice Gardner Composition Competition in 2009. The first winner was pianist/composer Rachel Matthews, whose work Dreams for Viola and Piano was premiered by violist Scott Slapin and the composer at the 2010 International Viola Congress.

Maurice Gardner Composition Competition laureates

- 2010 – Rachel Matthews: Dreams for viola and piano (2008); Ourtext Edition
- 2012 – Michael Djupstrom: Walimai for alto saxophone (or viola) and piano (2005); Bright Press
- 2014 – Matthew Browne: Exit, Pursued by a Bear for viola solo (2012); Maestoso Music
- 2016 – Qi Jing: Sonata for solo viola, Threnody (2013)
- 2020 – Max Vinetz: Other, for solo viola
- 2022 – Daniel Reza Sabzghabaei: ...under this blue of my land (زیر همین آبی وطنم...) for viola and voice (2019)
- 2024 – Christopher Lowry: Zenith, for viola and tape

== AVS Publications ==
In 2010 the American Viola Society began digital publication of sheet music under the AVS Publications name. The largest selection of scores to date are works by American composers as part of the "American Viola Project," which aims to "collect, publish, and preserve viola music from the United States." Works by such noted composers as Quincy Porter, Arthur Foote, and Michael Colgrass have been published as well as contributions by less well-known composers. Other publishing priorities include works for multiple violas and movements from the cantatas of J. S. Bach that prominently feature the viola.

== AVS Presidents ==
- 1971–1981 Myron Rosenblum, Founder
- 1981–1986 Maurice Riley
- 1986–1990 David Dalton
- 1990–1994 Alan de Veritch
- 1994–1998 Thomas Tatton
- 1998–2002 Peter Slowik
- 2002–2005 Ralph Fielding
- 2005–2008 Helen Callus
- 2008–2011 Juliet White-Smith
- 2011–2014 Nokuthula Ngwenyama
- 2014–2017 Kathryn Steely
- 2017–2020 Michael Palumbo
- 2020–2023 Hillary Herndon
- 2023–2026 Ames Asbell

== See also ==
- Primrose International Viola Archive, containing the official archives of the AVS
