= Roland and Almita Vamos =

- Born: Roland Vamos; Almita Vamos; July 20, 1930 (age 96) (Roland); September 16, 1938 (age 87) (Almita)
- Education: Juilliard School (both)
- Occupations: Violin instructor; Viola instructor
- Awards: NEA Distinguished Teacher Award; ASTA Distinguished Service Award; Presidential Excellence in Teaching Award (6 times)

Roland and Almita Vamos /ˈveɪmoʊs/ are a husband-and-wife team of violin and viola instructors recognized as leading pedagogues in string instruction. The Vamoses have been recognized at the White House seven times and were named Distinguished Teachers by the National Endowment for the Arts. They have been honored by the American String Teachers Association (ASTA) with the Distinguished Service Award, and showcased on CBS' Sunday Morning News.

== Background and education ==
Roland Vamos was born July 20, 1930. He studied with Oscar Shumsky and William Lincer at the Juilliard School. He performed as a member of the Houston Symphony, Dallas Symphony, Radio City Music Hall Orchestra, and the Contemporary String Quartet.

Almita Vamos was born September 16, 1938. She studied with Mischa Mischakoff and Louis Persinger at the Juilliard School. As a performing artist, she won the Concert Artists Guild Award in New York City along with other prizes.

== Teaching career ==
The Vamoses are members of the faculty at the Music Institute of Chicago and the Chicago College of Performing Arts at Roosevelt University. Roland Vamos has served as Director of the Music Institute of Chicago Academy Orchestra since its inception in 2006.

Prior to their positions at Roosevelt University, they taught at Northwestern University's Bienen School of Music, Oberlin Conservatory of Music, the University of Minnesota, Western Illinois University, University of Kentucky, and Antioch College. They also teach at summer music festivals including Chautauqua Music Festival, Aspen Music Festival, and Bowdoin International Music Festival.

== Notable students ==
Their former students include violinists Rachel Barton Pine, Jennifer Koh, and fr:Benjamin Beilman (winner of a 2012 Avery Fisher Career Grant); violist Matthew Lipman (2015 Avery Fisher Career Grant recipient); founding members of the Ying Quartet (Janet Ying and Philip Ying); and Ryan Meehan of the Calidore String Quartet. Other notable former students include violinists Lisa Kim of the New York Philharmonic and Yang Xu of the Metropolitan Opera Orchestra, and violist Cathy Basrak of the Boston Symphony Orchestra.

Their son, Brandon Vamos, is a cellist and founding member of the Pacifica Quartet, along with his wife, violinist Simin Ganatra, who studied with the Vamoses.

== Teaching philosophy ==
The Vamoses are known for their "team teaching" approach, with students often studying with both instructors to benefit from their complementary perspectives. Rachel Barton Pine has credited them with encouraging artistic development over competitive success, saying they "wanted me to think long term."

== Awards and recognition ==
- Distinguished Teacher Award, National Endowment for the Arts
- Distinguished Service Award, American String Teachers Association
- Presidential Excellence in Teaching Award (6 times, Roland Vamos)
- White House recognition (7 occasions)
