= Cleveland Quartet =

American string quartet

- Official Cleveland Quartet logo

Background information
- Origin: Cleveland, Ohio, US
- Genres: Classical
- Occupation: Chamber orchestra
- Years active: 1969 – 17 December 1995
- Labels: RCA Red Seal Telarc
- Members: William Preucil, Violin; Peter Salaff, Violin; James Dunham, Viola; Paul Katz, Cello
- Past members: Donald Weilerstein, Violin (1969–1988); Martha Strongin Katz, Viola (1969–1980); Atar Arad, Viola (1980–1987)
- Website: www.ClevelandQuartet.com

The Cleveland Quartet was a string quartet founded in 1969 by violinist Donald Weilerstein, at the time an instructor at the Cleveland Institute of Music, whose director Victor Babin had secured funding for an in-resident quartet (the institute's first) to be headed by Weilerstein. Weilerstein formed the group that summer at the Marlboro Music School and Festival with violinist Peter Salaff, violist Martha Strongin Katz, and cellist Paul Katz. The group was initially called the "New Cleveland Quartet." In 1971, the group left the Cleveland Institute because of disagreements over teaching loads and took up residency at the University at Buffalo, The State University of New York; they dropped the word "New" from their name at this time. In 1976, the quartet made their final change of residency and moved to the Eastman School of Music in Rochester, New York.

The quartet had three personnel changes: violist Atar Arad replaced Strongin Katz in 1980; violist James Dunham then replaced Arad in 1987; and William Preucil replaced Weilerstein as first violin in 1989. The quartet disbanded in 1995. Preucil became concertmaster of the Cleveland Orchestra, a position he held until 2018, when he was fired for sexual misconduct. Paul Katz, Martha Strongin Katz and Donald Weilerstein are on the faculty of the New England Conservatory of Music, and Weilerstein performs in a trio with his wife Vivian Hornik Weilerstein and his daughter, cellist Alisa Weilerstein; Peter Salaff was on the faculty of the Cleveland Institute of Music through the summer of 2018; Atar Arad teaches at the Jacobs School of Music at Indiana University; and James Dunham teaches at the Shepherd School of Music at Rice University. The Cleveland Quartet recorded prodigiously for RCA Red Seal and the Cleveland-based Telarc label; a 23-CD boxed set of the complete RCA Red Seal recordings by the Cleveland Quartet was issued in 2023.
