= Caroline Coade =

American violist

Caroline Coade is an American violist and teacher. She is an Associated Professor of Viola at the School of Music, Theatre, and Dance at University of Michigan.

Coade was born and raised in San Diego. She began playing violin at the age of 6 but switched to viola when she turned 14. She graduated from the Interlochen Arts Academy and then pursued her Bachelor of Music degree from the Oberlin Conservatory as well as the Artist Diploma from the Curtis Institute of Music followed by a Master's from the Juilliard School. In those schools, she was guided by Karen Tuttle, Joyce Robbins, Jeffrey Irvine, David Takeno, Dave Holland, and Eugene Becker. She is a participant in the Great Lakes Chamber Music Festival, Laurel Festival of the Arts and Marlboro Music Festival. She has played in the Cleveland and Philadelphia Orchestras, as well as the New York Philharmonic.

Coade is a Professor of Viola at the University of Michigan and is Assistant -Principal of the Detroit Symphony Orchestra. She serves as a faculty member of the Green Mountain Chamber Music Festival, Heifetz International Music Institute and Meadowmount School of Music, as well as previously on faculty at Bowdoin International Music Festival, Chautauqua Music Festival, and the National Music Festival.
