= Nokuthula Ngwenyama =

American classical composer and violist

- Born: June 16, 1976 (age 49)
- Genres: Classical music
- Occupation: Musician
- Instrument: Viola
- Website: thulamusic.com

Nokuthula Ngwenyama (born June 16, 1976) is an American solo violist and composer of Ndebele and Japanese descent. She is a recipient of the Avery Fisher Career Grant and has won the Primrose International Viola Competition and the Young Concert Artists International Auditions.

== Background ==
Sixteen-year-old Nokuthula Ngwenyama came to international attention when she won the Primrose International Viola Competition in 1993 and the Young Concert Artists International Auditions in 1994. Since then, she has been a soloist with orchestras around the world, including the Atlanta Symphony Orchestra, Baltimore Symphony Orchestra, Charlotte Symphony Orchestra, Indianapolis Symphony Orchestra, Los Angeles Philharmonic and the National Symphony Orchestra in Washington. She has appeared in recital at the Kennedy Center, Japan's Suntory Hall, the Louvre, and the White House.

She is an alumna of the Crossroads School, Colburn School for the Performing Arts, Curtis Institute of Music, and the Conservatoire National Supérieur de Musique de Paris as a Fulbright Scholar. She also has a Master of Theological Studies degree from Harvard University. She is a past president of the American Viola Society and director of the Primrose International Viola Competition.
