= Roland Glassl =

German musician

Roland Glassl (born 1972 in Ingolstadt, West Germany) is a professional German viola player. He has won the Lionel Tertis Competition as well as the International Competition in Vienna. Glassl has collaborated with many leading artists, and is also a member of the Mandelring Quartet.
