= Raphael Bronstein =

Lithuanian-born violinist and violin professor (1896 - 1988)

Raphael Bronstein (June 25, 1896 – November 4, 1988) was a Lithuanian-born American violinist and violin professor.

== Early life ==
He was born in a Jewish family in Vilnius, Lithuania and studied violin with Leopold Auer at the St. Petersburg Conservatory. He arrived in the United States in 1923 to take a job as an assistant to Auer. Bronstein had one daughter, Ariana Bronne, who taught at the Manhattan School of Music.

== Career ==
Bronstein's teaching career spanned 65 years and was responsible for a large number of the current generation of leading violin teachers and performers. He taught at the Hartt School in Hartford, Boston University, Manhattan School of Music, Queens College, City University of New York and the Graduate Center of the City University of New York. He is remembered annually at the Manhattan School of Music with the Raphael Bronstein Award. Bronstein's students have included Elmar Oliveira, Margaret Jones Wiles, Michael Ludwig, Martha Strongin Katz, Lya Stern, Jay Zhong, Kerry McDermott, Judith Morse, Estelle Kerner, Richard Auldon Clark, Linya Su, and his own daughter Ariana Bronne. Daniel Kobialka and Phillip Ruder are also among Bronstein's most noteworthy students.

He founded and conducted the Bronstein Symphonietta in 1949. He wrote the Science of Violin Playing.

== Later life ==
He died at St. Luke's Hospital in Manhattan, New York City on November 4, 1988.
