= Paul Katz =

American cellist

Paul Katz is an American cellist, who was a member of the Cleveland Quartet from 1969 to 1995. He and his wife, pianist Pei-Shan Lee, reside in Boston and teach at the New England Conservatory of Music.

== Education ==
Katz received a Bachelor of Music degree from the University of Southern California School of Music and a Master of Music from the Manhattan School of Music. He studied with Gregor Piatigorsky, János Starker, Bernard Greenhouse, Leonard Rose, and Gábor Rejtő.

== Career ==
Since 2001 Katz has taught at the New England Conservatory He had been professor of cello and chamber music at the Shepherd School of Music at Rice University and the Eastman School of Music. His recordings with the Cleveland Quartet, have received Grammy awards for Best Chamber Music Recording and also for Best Recorded Contemporary Composition in 1996.

He has also played as soloist with many groups, including the Pacifica Quartet, the Ariel Quartet, and the Jupiter Quartet.

He serves on the National Advisory Board of the Fischoff National Chamber Music Association. Paul Katz is the founder of CelloBello - an online cello resource center.

== Honors ==
Katz holds an Honorary D.M.A. from Albright College. He received the Chevalier du Violoncelle from the Eva Janzer Memorial Cello Center of Indiana University in 2003.
