= William Preucil =

American violinist

William Preucil (born January 30, 1958) is an American violinist. During a musical career spanning several decades, he served as concertmaster for four major American orchestras, most notably the Cleveland Orchestra from 1995, until he was dismissed in 2018. He also played with the Cleveland Quartet, which won a Grammy Award for Best Chamber Music Performance in 1997. He was a longtime member of the faculty at Cleveland Institute of Music until his resignation in 2018, following allegations of sexual misconduct.

== Early life and education ==
William Preucil was born on January 30, 1958, in Dearborn, Michigan, to a musical family. His mother, father, and various siblings played violin, while other family members played the harp, the horn, and the cello.

Preucil started playing the violin at the age of five, initially studying with his mother. At the age of 16, he graduated with honors from the Interlochen Center for the Arts. He later entered the Indiana University School of Music, where he earned a Performer's Certificate under the tutelage of Josef Gingold. He also studied with Zino Francescatti and György Sebők.

== Career ==
In 1982, Preucil became the concertmaster of the Atlanta Symphony Orchestra; he had previously served as the concertmaster of the Utah Symphony and the Nashville Symphony. He appeared as soloist with the orchestra in 70 performances of 15 different violin concertos. In 1989, Preucil left the Atlanta Symphony to become the first violinist of the Cleveland Quartet; he would remain so until the quartet's disbanding seven seasons later. During his tenure with the ensemble, Preucil won a Grammy Award for Best Chamber Music Performance in 1996 for a recording of John Corigliano's String Quartet. He also recorded the complete Beethoven string quartets, as well as chamber works by Haydn, Mozart, Schubert, and Brahms, for the Telarc label.

In 1995, Preucil became the concertmaster of the Cleveland Orchestra, serving until his termination in 2018. He regularly appeared with the orchestra as soloist in concertos, and also has appeared as soloist with the Detroit Symphony Orchestra, Hong Kong Philharmonic Orchestra, Minnesota Orchestra, Rochester Philharmonic Orchestra, and the Taipei Philharmonic Orchestra. Each summer, Preucil also served as the concertmaster of the Mainly Mozart Festival Orchestra. Preucil is currently the violinist of the Lanier Trio, which has recorded the complete Dvořák piano trios and the trios of Mendelssohn and Paulus.

Preucil was a longtime faculty member of the Cleveland Institute of Music and was serving as Distinguished Professor of Violin upon his resignation in 2018. Preucil also served as Distinguished Visiting Lecturer at Furman University before being terminated in 2018. He also previously served on the faculties of the University of Georgia and the Eastman School of Music.

He also is known for recording the music CDs for the Suzuki Violin Volumes.

== Sexual misconduct allegations ==
On July 26, 2018, graphic allegations of Preucil committing acts of sexual misconduct were published in The Washington Post. Preucil's employers swiftly reacted in wake of the revelations. On July 27, 2018, André Gremillet, the Cleveland Orchestra's executive director, announced that the orchestra was suspending Preucil with pay and investigating the claims made in the Washington Post. Additionally on July 27, Paul Hogle, the president and executive director of the Cleveland Institute of Music, released a statement saying that while he declined to comment on details in the article, the school is "deeply troubled" by the allegations and has "zero tolerance" for behavior that puts its students at risk. According to a spokeswoman for the Cleveland Institute of Music, the school had begun to review the situation internally. On July 28, 2018, Preucil resigned from the faculty of the Cleveland Institute of Music and was dismissed from his post at Furman University.

On August 16, 2018, the orchestra announced that it had hired the Debevoise & Plimpton law firm to conduct an independent investigation of Preucil, including the claims made in The Washington Post. The investigation was overseen by a special committee consisting of five members from the orchestra's board of trustees. During the course of the investigation, more than 70 people were interviewed, and Preucil himself was interviewed by the investigators on October 18, 2018. In that interview, Preucil admitted to "engaging in sexual contact with three female students during or after lessons," but refused to answer a number of other questions, "which largely focused on sexual activity with women who had not already been identified in the press." The investigation concluded that Preucil used his position to entice female students to one-on-one situations where he engaged in sexual misconduct, and used his position in the classical community to ensure that victims remained silent. On October 24, 2018, Preucil was fired by the Cleveland Orchestra following its investigation.

== Personal life ==
Preucil was married to the violinist Gwen Starker-Preucil, daughter of the famed cellist János Starker. They divorced in December 2017. His daughter, Alexandra Preucil, is also a violinist; she previously served as assistant concertmaster of the Cleveland Orchestra.
