= Atar Arad =

Israeli-American musical artist

Atar Arad עתר ארד
- Born: March 8, 1945 (age 80)
- Genres: classical music
- Occupation: violist
- Instrument: viola
- Labels: RCA Red Seal
- Website: Atar Arad's homepage

Atar Arad (Hebrew: עתר ארד; born 8 March 1945) is an Israeli American violist, professor of music, essayist and composer.

== Biography ==
Arad and his brother, architect Ron Arad, were born in Tel Aviv, Israel. Arad began his training on the violin in Tel Aviv and received an Artist Diploma in 1966 from the Samuel Rubin Israeli Academy of Music. In 1968 he was selected for study at Chapelle Musicale Reine Elisabeth in Waterloo, Belgium, earning a Laureate there in 1971 and a Diplome Superieure from Brussels Conservatory in 1973.

Having decided to devote himself to the viola in 1971, he entered the Carl Flesch International Competition in 1972 as a violist, winning the City of London prize (second prize) in his first public appearance with the instrument. Two months later he repeated, winning first prize in the International Viola Competition in Geneva, Switzerland.

Arad has performed around the world as a soloist with orchestras and as a member of the Cleveland Quartet from 1980 to 1987, taking the seat previously established by founding member Martha Strongin Katz. He was succeeded by James Dunham.

Arad teaches at Indiana University's Jacobs School of Music in Bloomington, and the Steans Institute for Young Artists at the Ravinia Festival in Highland Park, Illinois as well as the Domaine Forget Music and Dance Academy in Quebec. Previously he was professor of viola at the Eastman School of Music in Rochester, New York. He has also taught at the Shepherd School of Music at Rice University in Houston, Texas, and has been an artist/lecturer at Carnegie Mellon University in Pittsburgh, Pennsylvania. Prior to 1980 he served on faculties at Chapelle Musicale Reine Elisabeth and the Royal Northern College of Music, Manchester, England.

== Performance venues ==
- Berlin Music Festival, Berlin, Germany
- Israel Festival, Caesarea, Israel
- Flanders Music Festival, Antwerp, Belgium
- Edinburgh Festival, Edinburgh, Scotland
- Salzburg Festival, Salzburg, Austria
- Mostly Mozart Festival, New York City, NY, United States
- Sitka Summer Music Festival, Sitka, Alaska, United States
- Aspen Music Festival, Aspen, Colorado, United States
- Chautauqua Festival, Chautauqua, New York, United States
- Ravinia Festival near Chicago, Illinois, United States
- Domaine Forget International Festival, Saint-Irenee, Quebec, Canada
- North Shore Chamber Music Festival, Northbrook, Illinois, United States

== Compositions and recordings ==
His compositions include:

- Sonata for Viola Solo (1992)
- String Quartet (1993)
- Caprices for Viola Solo (2003)
- Concerto per la Viola (2005)

His essays have explored compositional aspects of viola concertos:

- The Thirteen Pages (The American String Teacher, Winter 1988)
- Walton as Scapino (The Strad, February 1989)

He has recorded, as featured soloist or with the Cleveland Quartet, on the RCA Red Seal, CBS Masterworks, Teldec Telefunken, Telarc and RIAX Records Classical labels.
