= Joseph de Pasquale =

American violist (1919 - 2015)

Joseph de Pasquale (October 14, 1919 – June 22, 2015) was an American violist.

== Career ==
Born in Philadelphia, Pennsylvania, Joseph de Pasquale was a student of Louis Bailly, Max Aronoff and William Primrose at the Curtis Institute of Music. He was the principal violist of the Boston Symphony Orchestra from 1947 to 1964, and then, at the request of Eugene Ormandy, principal violist of the Philadelphia Orchestra until 1995. At a certain point, three of his brothers (William, Robert, and Francis; who formed the de Pasquale String Quartet with him) played with him in the Philadelphia Orchestra, with three of the brothers boasting first desk seatings.

Joseph de Pasquale performed and recorded with Angelin Chang, Jascha Heifetz, Ruggiero Ricci, Isaac Stern, Gregor Piatigorsky, Norman Carol, and Anshel Brusilow, among others. He also premiered several important compositions of the viola repertoire, including the Viola Concerto by Walter Piston and the Viola Sonata by George Rochberg, and recorded for the RCA, Sony, Boston, Albany Records, and Decca labels.

Until his death at age 95, Joseph de Pasquale was Professor of Viola at the Curtis Institute of Music in Philadelphia. He raised a whole generation of prominent violists, among them Roberto Diaz, Stephen Wyrczynski, Viacheslav Dinerchtein, Richard Fleischman and Cathy Basrak. At the time of his retirement from the Philadelphia Orchestra, 2/3 of the viola section's players were his former students.
