= Karen Ritscher =

American violist and academic

Karen Ritscher (23 May 1952 – 15 July 2025) was an American violist, educator, and academic.

== Performance career ==
Ritscher served as the principal violist for both the Dallas Opera, Houston Grand Opera, and Brooklyn Philharmonic; and the assistant principal viola for the American Composers Orchestra. She performed with the Orpheus Chamber Orchestra, the Houston Symphony, New York City Ballet Orchestra, and the New York City Opera Orchestra. Ritscher was a member of the Aureus Piano Quartet the Azure Ensemble as well as playing in many other chamber music ensembles and festivals.

As a new music collaborator, Ritscher commissioned and performed new works by composers such as by Chen Yi, Bruce Adolphe, Judith Shatin, and Gabriela Lena Frank.

As a soloist, she performed many recitals, and appeared with the Westchester Philharmonic, the Dallas Chamber Orchestra, the Colonial Symphony of New Jersey, the Texas Music Festival Orchestra, and the Texas Chamber Symphony.

== Teaching and legacy ==
Ritscher served on the faculties of the Manhattan School of Music, Rice University, the Mannes College of Music, Oberlin Conservatory, the Eastman School of Music, Boston University, and as a guest for masterclasses in the United States, Asia, and Europe. She served on the faculty of the Karen Tuttle Coordination Workshop from its inception in 2002.

As an extension of her teaching practice dedicated to movement, Ritscher was also a certified 5Rhythms® Movement teacher, and led workshops and clinics often combining the exploration of movement with the art of self-expression as a musician.

As an academic, Ritscher published many articles on practice, physicality, and performance. She was the string consultant for Madeline Bruser's book, "The Art of Practicing; A Guide to Making Music from the Heart." Additionally, Ritscher co-authored The Karen Tuttle Legacy: A Resource and Guide for Viola Students, Teachers, and Performers (Carl Fischer Music).

== Selected discography ==
- Chen Yi & Karen Tanaka. Invisible Curve. Azure Ensemble (Susan Glaser, Airi Yoshioka, Karen Ritscher, Pitnarry Shin, Christopher Oldfather). New World Records, 1998.
- Steve Kuhn. Steve Kuhn With Strings – Promises Kept. Conducted and orchestrated by Carlos Franzetti. ECM, 2004
