= Karen Tuttle =

American violist (1920–2010)

- Born: Katherine Ann Tuttle; March 28, 1920; Lewiston, Idaho, US
- Died: December 16, 2010 (aged 90); Philadelphia, Pennsylvania
- Occupations: Viola teacher, violinist, violist, musician
- Years active: 1935–2005
- Spouse: Dr. Morton Herskowitz
- Children: 1

Karen Tuttle (March 28, 1920 – December 16, 2010) was an American violist and pedagogue, well known for her teaching system that she called coordination. There are several aspects to coordination including stance, balancing the instrument, physical releases, body awareness and integration, musical impulses, and emotional responses to the music. She began performing on violin at the age of sixteen before switching to viola in 1941. Tuttle actively performed and taught at a number of institutions until her retirement in 2005.

== Early years and education ==
Born Katherine Ann Tuttle in Lewiston, Idaho, she changed her name to Karen as a young woman. Her father Ray, a fiddler from a family of farmers, and her mother Eunice, the director of a local church choir, moved to Walla Walla, Washington with Karen when she was twelve. After eighth grade, Karen refused to continue school, and instead, devoted her time to learning the violin. She studied with Jean Heers, Karel Havlíček, and Henri Temianka, and actively toured the West Coast as a teen. However, she experienced tension and pain from playing the violin that her teachers could not solve.

In 1941, Tuttle heard violist William Primrose play in Los Angeles with the London String Quartet. She was so impressed with his relaxed way of playing that she immediately asked him for lessons. Primrose agreed, as long as she switched to viola and moved to Philadelphia to attend the Curtis Institute of Music, where Primrose was a faculty member.

While at Curtis, Tuttle spent hours observing Primrose and analyzing his relaxed way of playing. In 1944, she became Primrose's teacher assistant. Primrose often sent students with technical problems to Tuttle for help, because she could better articulate what they needed to create beautiful sound. She graduated in 1948, and when Primrose left Curtis in 1951, Tuttle became the head of the viola and chamber music departments. She taught at the Curtis Institute of Music until 1955.

== Career ==
Although an excellent teacher, Tuttle also continued to perform on the viola. In the early 1950s, she became the first female member of the NBC Symphony Orchestra. In 1955, she collaborated with cellist Pablo Casals at the Pablo Casals Festival in Prades, where she returned several times. She also frequently participated in the Marlboro Music Festival in Vermont. In 1958, she traveled to Fiji, Samoa, and Tahiti, and performed for native audiences there. She made her Carnegie Hall recital debut in February 1960. Her recital was reviewed by Harold Schonberg, a leading reviewer for The New York Times. He wrote, "About as large an audience as Carnegie Recital Hall has ever held jammed it yesterday evening at 5:30 to hear Karen Tuttle's recital. The violist, with Artur Balsam at the piano, gave a concert that seemed to be attended by every string player in town." Tuttle also performed and recorded with the Galimir, Gotham, and Schneider Quartets, which was revolutionary for a woman at the time. From 1965, she also played with the American String Trio.

From 1970 onward, she taught at the State University of New York at Albany, the Philadelphia Musical Academy, the Peabody Institute, Curtis, the Mannes College of Music, the Manhattan School of Music, and Juilliard. She retired in 2005.

== Personal life ==
Tuttle first married at age 18, and divorced several years later. At age 25, she married violist Philip Goldberg. This marriage was also short-lived. As a single woman, Tuttle had her daughter Robin in 1954, and she found a Reichian therapist to help her make peace with her decision to be a single mother. Coincidentally, in 1957, she married Dr. Morton Herskowitz, who was also a Reichian therapist. She remained with him for the rest of her life. Karen Tuttle died on December 16, 2010, in Philadelphia from complications of Alzheimer's.

== Honors and legacy ==
In 1994, Tuttle was recognized by ASTA with the Artist Teacher Award. She also received honorary doctorate degrees from the Curtis Institute of Music in 2005 and the New England Conservatory in 2010.

Tuttle developed the Karen Tuttle Coordination Technique by watching William Primrose play and collaborating with various people. Cellist Pablo Casals, violinist Alexander Schneider, violinist and doctor Demetrius Constantine Dounis, and psychiatrist Wilhelm Reich all inspired her. Her technique focuses on coordinating a musician's physical and emotional awareness to create a beautiful sound. Her method focuses on tensionless playing and is adaptable for each individual student's needs. The Karen Tuttle Coordination Workshop occurs annually for violists interested in exploring her technique.

Many of her students have gone on to have solo careers and teach at prominent universities and music conservatories: Christine Rutledge, Sheila Browne, Caroline Coade, Susan Dubois, Edward Gazouleas, Jeffrey Irvine, Kim Kashkashian, Michelle LaCourse, Katherine Murdock, Ashan Pillai, Lawrence Power, Lynne Ramsey, André Roy, Karen Ritscher, Carol Rodland, Kate Hamilton, Masumi Per Rostad, Jennifer Stumm, Stephen Wyrczynski, and Brenton Caldwell.

== Recordings ==
Karen Tuttle made many recordings throughout her career, both private and commercially released. Her discography includes:

- Johann Sebastian Bach. Musikalisches Opfer, BWV 1079, No. 8, Ricercar a 6. Orrea Pernel, Alexander Schneider, violin, Karen Tuttle, Milton Thomas, viola, Daniel Seidenberg, Leopold Teraspulsky, cello, June Rotenberg, Double Bass, Pablo Casals, conductor. (Cascavelle CD 3061)
- Ludwig van Beethoven. Serenade in D, Op. 8. American String Trio: Marvin Morgenstern, violin, Karen Tuttle, viola, John Goberman, cello. (SUNY Albany Music Department LP MG-7-201,818-9)
- Ernest Bloch. Suite for Viola and Piano (1919). Karen Tuttle, viola, Jacob Lateiner, piano. (Privately released)
- Alexander Borodin. Quartet No. 2 in D Major. Galimir Quartet: Felix Galimir, Henry Siegl, violins, Karen Tuttle, viola, Seymour Barab, cello. (Period Records LP SPLP 505)
- Johannes Brahms. Songs for Alto, Viola, and Piano, Op. 91. Elaine Bonazzi, mezzo-soprano, Karen Tuttle, viola, Ellen Mack, piano. (Bridge CD 9176)
- Benjamin Britten. Fantasy Quartet for Oboe and Strings, Op. 2. Harold Gomberg, oboe, Felix Galimir, violin, Karen Tuttle, viola, Seymour Barab, cello. (Esoteric Records LP ES-504)
- ___. String Quartet No. 1 in D, Op. 25. Galimir String Quartet: Felix Galimir, Leon Zawisza, violins, Karen Tuttle, viola, Seymour Barab, cello. (Esoteric Records LP ES-504)
- Jean Françaix. String Trio (1933). American String Trio: Marvin Morgenstern, violin, Karen Tuttle, viola, John Goberman, cello. (SUNY Albany Music Department LP MG-7-201,818-9)
- Alexander Glazunov, Anatoly Lyadov and Nikolai Rimsky-Korsakov. Jour de Fete. Galimir Quartet: Felix Galimir, Henry Siegl, violins, Karen Tuttle, viola, Seymour Barab, cello. (Period Records LP SPLP 505)
- Joseph Haydn. Quartet in C Major, Op. 76, No. 3, "Emperor" and Quartet in d minor, Op. 76, No. 2. Galimir Quartet: Felix Galimir, Henry Siegl, violins, Karen Tuttle, viola, Seymour Barab, cello. (Period Records SPLP 504)
- ___. Quartet in E♭, Op. 1, No. "0" and Quartet in B♭, Op. 1, No. 1. Schneider Quartet: Alexander Schneider, Isidore Cohen, violins, Karen Tuttle, viola, Madeline Foley, cello. (Haydn Society LP HS-9075)
- ___. Quartet in E♭, Op. 1, No. 2 and Quartet in D, Op. 1, No. 3. Schneider Quartet: Alexander Schneider, Isidore Cohen, violins, Karen Tuttle, viola, Madeline Foley, cello. (Haydn Society LP HS-9076)
- ___. Quartet in G, Op. 1, No. 4 and Quartet in C, Op. 1, No. 6. Schneider Quartet: Alexander Schneider, Isidore Cohen, violins, Karen Tuttle, viola, Madeline Foley, cello. (Haydn Society LP HS-9077)
- ___. Quartet in A, Op. 2, No. 1 and Quartet in D, Op. 2, No. 2. Schneider Quartet: Alexander Schneider, Isidore Cohen, violins, Karen Tuttle, viola, Herman Busch, cello. (Haydn Society LP HS-9078)
- ___. Quartet in B♭, Op. 2, No. 3 and Quartet in F, Op. 2, No. 4. Schneider Quartet: Alexander Schneider, Isidore Cohen, violins, Karen Tuttle, viola, Herman Busch, cello. (Haydn Society LP HS-9079)
- ___. Quartet in D, Op. 2, No. 5 and Quartet in B♭, Op. 2, No. 6. Schneider Quartet: Alexander Schneider, Isidore Cohen, violins, Karen Tuttle, viola, Herman Busch, cello. (Haydn Society LP HS-9080)
- ___. Quartet in E, Op. 17, No. 1 and Quartet in F, Op. 17, No. 2. Schneider Quartet: Alexander Schneider, Isidore Cohen, violins, Karen Tuttle, viola, Madeline Foley, cello. (Haydn Society LP HS-9083)
- ___. Quartet in E, Op. 17, No. 1 and Quartet in c, Op. 17, No. 4. Schneider Quartet: Alexander Schneider, Isidore Cohen, violins, Karen Tuttle, viola, Madeline Foley, cello. (Haydn Society LP HSQ-13)
- ___. Quartet in F, Op. 17, No. 2 and Quartet in E♭, Op. 17, No. 3. Schneider Quartet: Alexander Schneider, Isidore Cohen, violins, Karen Tuttle, viola, Madeline Foley, cello. (Haydn Society LP HSQ-14)
- ___. Quartet in E♭, Op. 17, No. 3 and Quartet in c, Op. 17, No. 4. Schneider Quartet: Alexander Schneider, Isidore Cohen, violins, Karen Tuttle, viola, Madeline Foley, cello. (Haydn Society LP HS-9084)
- ___. Quartet in G, Op. 17, No. 5 and Quartet in D, Op. 17, No. 6. Schneider Quartet: Alexander Schneider, Isidore Cohen, violins, Karen Tuttle, viola, Madeline Foley, cello. (Haydn Society LP HSQ-15, HS-9085)
- ___. Quartet in E♭, Op. 20, No. 1 and Quartet in C, Op. 20, No. 2. Schneider Quartet: Alexander Schneider, Isidore Cohen, violins, Karen Tuttle, viola, Herman Busch, cello. (Haydn Society LP HS-16, HS-9086)
- ___. Quartet in g, Op. 20, No. 3 and Quartet in D, Op. 20, No. 4. Schneider Quartet: Alexander Schneider, Isidore Cohen, violins, Karen Tuttle, viola, Herman Busch, cello. (Haydn Society LP HSQ-17, HS-9087)
- ___. Quartet in f, Op. 20, No. 5 and Quartet in A, Op. 20, No. 6. Schneider Quartet: Alexander Schneider, Isidore Cohen, violins, Karen Tuttle, viola, Herman Busch, cello. (Haydn Society LP HS-9088)
- ___. Quartet in b, Op. 33, No. 1 and Quartet in E♭, Op. 33, No. 2, "The Joke". Schneider Quartet: Alexander Schneider, Isidore Cohen, violins, Karen Tuttle, viola, Herman Busch, cello. (Haydn Society LP HSQ-19)
- ___. Quartet in E♭, Op. 50, No. 3 and Quartet in f#, Op. 50, No. 4. Schneider Quartet: Alexander Schneider, Isidore Cohen, violins, Karen Tuttle, viola, Madeline Foley, cello. (Haydn Society LP HS-9090)
- ___. Quartet in F, Op. 50, No. 5, "The Dream" and Quartet in D, Op. 50, No. 6, "The Frog". Schneider Quartet: Alexander Schneider, Isidore Cohen, violins, Karen Tuttle, viola, Madeline Foley, cello. (Haydn Society LP HSQ-24, HS-9091)
- ___. Quartet, Op. 51 "The Seven Last Words of Christ on the Cross". Schneider Quartet: Alexander Schneider, Isidore Cohen, violins, Karen Tuttle, viola, Madeline Foley, cello. (Haydn Society LP HSQ-39, HS-9041)
- ___. Quartet in C, Op. 76, No. 3, "Emperor" and Quartet in B♭, Op. 76, No. 4, "Sunrise". Schneider Quartet: Alexander Schneider, Isidore Cohen, violins, violins, Karen Tuttle, viola, Herman Busch, cello. (Haydn Society LP HS-9053)
- ___. Quartet in D, Op. 76, No. 5 and Quartet in E♭, Op. 76, No. 6. Schneider Quartet: Alexander Schneider, Isidore Cohen, violins, Karen Tuttle, viola, Herman Busch, cello. (Haydn Society LP HS-9065)
- ___. Quartet in d, Op. 42 and Quartet in G, Op. 77, No. 1. Schneider Quartet: Alexander Schneider, Isidore Cohen, violins, Karen Tuttle, viola, Madeline Foley, cello. (Haydn Society LP HSQ-37)
- ___. Quartet in F, Op. 77, No. 2 and Quartet in B♭, Op. 103. Schneider Quartet: Alexander Schneider, Isidore Cohen, violins, Karen Tuttle, viola, Madeline Foley, cello. (Haydn Society LP HSQ-38)
- Hindemith, Paul. Sonata for Viola and Piano, Op. 11, No. 4. Karen Tuttle, viola, Pianist, unknown. (Privately released)
- ___. Die Serenaden, Op. 35, for Soprano, Oboe, Viola, and Cello. Lois Winter, soprano, Ronald Roseman, oboe, Karen Tuttle, viola, and John Goberman, cello. (Desto LP DC 6484)
- Wolfgang Amadeus Mozart. Clarinet Quintet in A major, K. 581. Sidney Forrest, Clarinet, Galimir Quartet: Felix Galimir, Stuart Canin, violins, Karen Tuttle, viola, Seymour Barab, cello. (Lyrichord LP LL67)
- ___. Oboe Quartet in F major, K. 370. Orrea Pernel, violin, Karen Tuttle, viola, Marcel Tabuteau, oboe, Paul Tortelier, cello. (Music and Arts CD 1113)
- Franz Schubert. Quintet in A major, "Trout". Istvan Nadas, piano, Felix Galimir, violin, Karen Tuttle, viola, Laszlo Varga, cello, Julius Levine, bass. (Period Records LP SPL 730)
- ___. Quintet in C major, Op. 163, D. 956. Orrea Pernel, Jacob Krachmalnick, violin, Karen Tuttle, viola, Pablo Casals, Madeline Foley, cello. (Music and Arts CD 1113)
- Alan Shulman. Homage to Erik Satie. Karen Tuttle, viola, Orchestra, unknown, Conductor, unknown. (Privately released)
