= Carol Rodland =

American viola player

Carol Rodland is an American viola player who studied with Karen Tuttle at the Juilliard School. She was Tuttle's teaching assistant for several years before taking a position as a viola teacher at the New England Conservatory. She is a recipient of a Fulbright grant; as a Beebe Fund Grantee, Rodland studied under and became the teaching assistant of Kim Kashkashian.

In February 2008, it was announced that Rodland would join the faculty at the Eastman School of Music for the Fall 2008 semester, replacing the retiring John Graham. In 2017, Rodland returned to her alma mater as professor of viola and chamber music at the Juilliard School.
