= List of violists =

This is a list of Wikipedia articles on notable viola players. In cases where a violist has also achieved fame in another musical area, such as conducting or composing, this is noted.

== Notable violists ==
=== A ===
- Tasso Adamopoulos (1944–2021)
- Julia Rebekka Adler (b. 1978)
- Adolfo Alejo (b. 1986), conductor
- Sir Hugh Allen (1869–1946), conductor
- Kris Allen (b. 1985)
- Vladimir Altshuler (b. 1946), conductor
- Ruben Altunyan (1939–2021), composer, conductor
- Johann Andreas Amon (1763–1825)
- B. Tommy Andersson (b. 1964), composer, conductor
- Paul Angerer (1927–2017), composer
- Steven Ansell (b. 1954)
- Atar Arad (b. 1945), composer
- Cecil Aronowitz (1916–1978)
- Dino Asciolla (1920–1994)
- Jean-Marie Auberson (1920–2004), violinist, conductor
- Emilie Autumn
- Eddie Ayres (b. 1967)

=== B ===
- Joseph Baber (1937–2022), composer
- Johann Aegidius Bach (1645–1716), organist
- Johann Sebastian Bach (1685–1750), composer
- Sigismund Bachrich (1841–1913), composer, violinist
- August Baeyens (1895–1966), composer
- Vladimir Bakaleinikov (1885–1953), conductor, composer
- Michael Balling (1866–1925), conductor
- Alain Bancquart (1934–2022), composer
- Rudolf Barshai (1924–2010), conductor
- Hans-Christian Bartel (1932–2014), composer
- Yuri Bashmet (b. 1953)
- Cathy Basrak (b. 1977)
- Natalie Bauer-Lechner (1858–1921)
- Sally Beamish (b. 1956), composer
- Ludwig van Beethoven (1770–1827), composer
- Sviatoslav Belonogov (b. 1965)
- Mitrofan Belyayev (1836–1904)
- František Benda (1709–1786), composer
- Jiří Antonín Benda (1722–1795), composer
- Daniel Benyamini (1925–1993)
- Wilhelm Georg Berger (1929–1993), composer
- Yehonatan Berick (1968–2020), violinist
- Harry Berly (1905–1937)
- Lise Berthaud (b. 1982)
- Vasily Bessel (1843–1907), music publisher
- Roger Best (1936–2013)
- Mikhail Bezverkhny (b. 1947), violinist
- Franz Beyer (1922–2018), musicologist
- Hatto Beyerle (1933–2023), chamber musician, conductor
- Luigi Alberto Bianchi (1945–2018)
- Benjamin Blake (1751–1827), composer, violinist
- Herbert Blendinger (1936–2020), composer
- Joseph von Blumenthal (1782–1856), violinist, composer
- Alexandre Pierre François Boëly (1785–1858)
- Emil Bohnke (1888–1928), composer, conductor
- Vadim Borisovsky (1900–1972)
- Jacques Borsarello (b. 1951)
- York Bowen (1884–1961), composer, pianist
- Máximo Arrates Boza (1859–1936), composer
- Jolyon Brettingham Smith (1949–2008), composer, conductor
- Frank Bridge (1879–1941), composer
- Benjamin Britten (1913–1976), composer
- Carolyn Waters Broe, composer, conductor
- Sheila Browne (b. 1971)
- František Brož (1896–1962), composer
- Gerard von Brucken Fock (1859–1935), composer
- Bjarne Brustad (1895–1978), composer, violinist
- Peter Bucknell (b. 1977)
- Kenji Bunch (b. 1973)
- Caleb Burhans (b. 1980), composer

=== C ===
- John Cale (b. 1942)
- Helen Callus
- Bartolomeo Campagnoli (1751–1827), composer, violinist
- Giuliano Carmignola (b. 1951), violinist
- David Aaron Carpenter (b. 1986)
- Henri Casadesus (1879–1947)
- Gérard Caussé (b. 1948)
- Eugenio Cavallini (1806–1881), violinist, conductor
- Alain Celo (b. 1960), composer
- Ladislav Černý (1891–1975)
- Eugène Chartier (1893–1963), violinist, conductor
- Roger Chase (b. 1953)
- André Hippolyte Chélard (1789–1861), composer, conductor
- Rebecca Clarke (1886–1979), composer
- Caroline Coade
- Eric Coates (1886–1957), composer
- Paul Coletti (b. 1959)
- Anthony Collins (1893–1963), composer, conductor
- Serge Collot (1923–2015)
- Carlton Cooley (1898–1981), composer
- Winifred Copperwheat (1905–76), performer, teacher
- Paul Cropper (1913–2006)
- Wayne Crouse (1924–2000)
- John Curro (1932–2019), conductor

=== D ===
- David Dalton (1934–2022)
- Harry Danks (1912–2001)
- Steven Dann (b. 1953)
- Gyula Dávid (1913–1977)
- Tania Davis (b. 1975)
- Brett Dean (b. 1961)
- Christophe Desjardins (1962–2020)
- Jack Delano (1914–1997), composer
- Alan de Veritch (b. 1947)
- Brett Deubner (b.1968)
- Patrizia Di Paolo
- Roberto Díaz (b. 1960)
- Viacheslav Dinerchtein (b. 1976)
- Paul Doktor (1919–1989)
- Demetrius Constantine Dounis (1886–1954), violinist, pedagogue
- Dimitris Dragatakis (1914–2001), composer
- Karen Dreyfus
- Duncan Druce (1939–2015), composer
- Fyodor Druzhinin (1932–2007)
- Matthias Durst (1815–1875), violinist, composer
- Charles Dutoit (b. 1936), conductor
- Lawrence Dutton (b. 1954)
- Antonín Dvořák (1841–1904), composer

=== E ===
- Heinrich Wilhelm Ernst (1814–1865), violinist
- Ernest van der Eyken (1913–2010), composer, conductor

=== F ===
- Ralph Farris (b. 1970)
- Kristina Fialová
- Federigo Fiorillo (1753–c.1823), violinist, composer, pedagogue
- William Flackton (1709–1978), composer
- Richard Fleischman (b. 1963)
- Watson Forbes (1909–1997)
- Cecil Forsyth (1870–1941), composer
- Johannes Fritsch (1941–2010), composer
- Lillian Fuchs (1901–1995)
- Arthur Furer (1924–2013), composer, violinist
- Paul Walter Fürst (1926–2013), composer
- Kenji Fusé (b. 1965), composer

=== G ===
- Grigori Gamburg (1900–1967), composer, conductor
- John Garvey (1921–2006), conductor
- Ottmar Gerster (1897–1969), composer, conductor
- Carlo Maria Giulini (1914–2005), conductor
- Bruno Giuranna (b. 1933)
- Donald A. Glaser (1926–2013), Nobel Prize–winning physicist
- Roland Glassl (b. 1972)
- Rosemary Glyde (1948–1994), composer
- Rivka Golani (b. 1946)
- Richard Goldner (1908–1991)
- Jonny Greenwood, lead guitarist of Radiohead
- Ebbe Grims-land (1915–2015)
- Amihai Grosz (b. 1979)
- Guido Guerrini (1890–1965), composer, conductor

=== H ===
- Veronika Hagen (b. 1963)
- Dietmar Hallmann (b. 1935)
- Hope Hambourg (1902–1989)
- Harutyun Hanesyan (1911–1987), composer
- John Harbison (b. 1938), composer
- Kenneth Harding (1903–1992), composer
- Joseph Haydn (1732–1809), composer
- Donald Heins (1878–1949), violinist, conductor, composer
- Jiří Herold (1875–1934)
- Willy Hess (1859–1939), violinist
- Raphael Hillyer (1914–2010)
- Paul Hindemith (1895–1963), composer
- Alfred Charles Hobday (1870–1942)
- Manfred Honeck (b. 1958), conductor
- Lorraine Hunt Lieberson (1954–2006), mezzo-soprano

=== I ===
- Nobuko Imai (b. 1943)
- Yuko Inoue

=== J ===
- Hanoch Jacoby (1909–1990), composer
- Baudime Jam (b. 1972), composer
- Janine Jansen (b. 1978), violinist
- Leroy Jenkins (1932–2007)
- Raymond Jeremy (1890–1969)
- Otto Joachim (1910–2010), composer
- Matthew Jones (b. 1974), violinist

=== K ===
- Jiří Kabeš (b. 1946), singer, songwriter
- Thomas Kakuska (1940–2005)
- Jan Karlin (b. 1954), producer, administrator
- Jurgis Karnavičius (1884–1941), composer
- Gilad Karni
- Kim Kashkashian (b. 1952)
- Milton Katims (1909–2006), conductor
- Martha Strongin Katz (b. 1942)
- Hugo Kauder (1888–1972), composer, violinist
- Nigel Keay (b. 1955), composer
- Nigel Kennedy (b. 1956), violinist
- Louise Lincoln Kerr (1892–1977), composer
- Isabelle van Keulen (b. 1966), violinist
- Volker David Kirchner (1942–2020), composer
- Dmitri Klebanov (1907–1987)
- Paul Klengel (1854–1935), violinist, pianist
- Garth Knox (b. 1956)
- Ulrich Koch (1921–1996)
- Vesko Kountchev (b. 1974)
- František Kočvara (1730–1791), composer
- Katalin Kokas (b. 1978), violinist
- Johann Král (1823–1912), also played viola d'amore
- Tosca Kramer (1903–1976)
- Alison Krauss (b. 1971)
- Emil Kreuz (1867–1932)
- Milan Křížek (1926–2018), composer
- Boris Kroyt (1897–1969)
- Theodore Kuchar (b. 1960), conductor
- Ferdinand Küchler (1867–1937), violinist, composer
- Michael Kugel (b. 1946)
- Sigiswald Kuijken (b. 1944), violinist, conductor

=== L ===
- Michelle LaCourse
- Théophile Laforge (1863–1918)
- Édouard Lalo (1823–1892), composer
- Anne Lanzilotti (b. 1983), composer
- Jaime Laredo (b. 1941), violinist
- Victor Legley (1915–1994), composer
- Pierre Lénert (b. 1966)
- Harold Levin (b. 1956)
- Avri Levitan (b. 1973)
- Jodi Levitz
- Teng Li
- Ingvar Lidholm (1921–2017), composer
- Samuel Lifschey (1889–1961)
- Lim Soon Lee (b. 1957), conductor
- Alfred Lipka (1931–2010)
- Ernest Llewellyn (1915–1982), violinist, conductor
- Lloyd Loar instrument designer, composer, played viola alta
- James Lockyer (1883–1962)
- James Lowe (b. 1976), conductor
- Lydia Luce, singer-songwriter
- Pál Lukács (1919–1981)

=== M ===
- Jef Maes (1905–1996), composer
- Virginia Majewski (1907–1995)
- Sergey Malov (b. 1983), violinist
- Mat Maneri (b. 1969), composer, violinist
- Michael Mann (1919–1977), violinist
- Jethro Marks
- Carlo Martelli (b. 1935), composer
- Tatjana Masurenko (b. 1965)
- Uri Mayer (b. 1946), conductor
- Donald McInnes (1939–2024)
- Eduard Melkus (b. 1928), violinist
- Felix Mendelssohn (1809–1847), composer
- Vladimir Mendelssohn (1949–2021), composer
- Yehudi Menuhin (1916–1999), violinist
- John Metcalfe (b. 1964)
- Michel Michalakakos (b. 1954)
- Miroslav Miletić (1925–2018), composer
- Shlomo Mintz (b. 1957), violinist
- Marco Misciagna (b. 1984), violinist, educator
- Alexander Mishnaevski
- Roberto Molinelli (b. 1963), composer, conductor
- Nils Mönkemeyer (b. 1978)
- Pierre Monteux (1875–1964), conductor
- Arie Van de Moortel (1918–1976), composer
- Wolfgang Amadeus Mozart (1756–1791), composer
- Janee Munroe (1923–2006)
- Henry Myerscough (1927–2007)

=== N ===
- Philipp Naegele (1928–2011), violinist
- Naruhito, Emperor of Japan (b. 1960)
- Oskar Nedbal (1874–1930), composer
- Paul Neubauer (b. 1962)
- Václav Neumann (1920–1995), conductor
- Maria Newman (b. 1962), violinist, composer
- Casimir Ney (1801–1877)
- Nokuthula Ngwenyama (b. 1976)

=== O ===
- Heiichiro Ohyama (b. 1947)
- David Oistrakh (1908–1974), violinist
- Raphaël Oleg (b. 1959), violinist
- Martin Outram

=== P ===
- Niccolò Paganini (1782–1840), composer, violinist
- Johannes Palaschko (1877–1932), violinist, composer
- Úna Palliser, vocalist, violinist
- Ian Parrott (1916–2012), composer
- Harry Partch (1901–1974), composer
- Ödön Pártos (1907–1977), composer
- Joseph de Pasquale (1919–2015)
- Bruno Pasquier (b. 1943)
- Pemi Paull (b. 1975)
- Pierre Pasquier (1902–1986)
- Clara Petrozzi (b. 1965), violinist, composer
- Allan Pettersson (1911–1980), composer
- Cynthia Phelps (b. 1961)
- Robert Pikler (1909–1984), violinist
- Ashan Pillai (b. 1969)
- Enrico Polo (1868–1953), violinist
- Jocelyn Pook (b. 1960), composer
- Diemut Poppen (b. 1960)
- Rita Porfiris (b. 1969)
- Ari Poutiainen (b. 1972)
- Lawrence Power (b. 1977)
- William Presser (1916–2004), composer, violinist
- Milton Preves (1909–2000)
- Joseph Primavera (1926–2006), conductor
- William Primrose (1904–1982)

=== Q ===
- Karl Traugott Queisser (1800–1846)

=== R ===
- Julian Rachlin (b. 1974), violinist
- Mary Ramsey (b. 1963), violinist, singer, songwriter
- Wilhelm Ramsøe (1837–1895), composer, conductor, violinist
- Émile Pierre Ratez (1851–1934), composer
- Mary Ruth Ray (1956–2013)
- Adolf Rebner (1876–1967)
- Ottorino Respighi (1879–1936), composer
- Sophia Reuter (b. 1971), violinist
- Allard de Ridder (1887–1966), conductor, composer
- Frederick Riddle (1912–1995)
- Timothy Ridout (b. 1995)
- Joaquín Riquelme García (b. 1983)
- Karen Ritscher (1952–2025)
- Hermann Ritter (1849–1926)
- Carol Rodland
- Jean Rogister (1879–1964), composer
- Hartmut Rohde (b. 1966)
- Alessandro Rolla (1757–1841), composer
- Antonio Rolla (1798–1837), violinist, composer
- Paul Rolland (1911–1978)
- Max Rostal (1905–1991), violinist
- Simon Rowland-Jones (b. 1950)
- Vincent Royer (b. 1961)
- Miklós Rózsa (1907–1995), composer
- Thomas Ryan (1827–1903)
- Maxim Rysanov (b. 1978)

=== S ===
- Pauline Sachse (b. 1980)
- Luigi Sagrati (1921–2008)
- Philip Sainton (1891–1967), composer, conductor
- Matthias Sannemüller (b. 1951)
- Stephanie Sant'Ambrogio (b. 1960), violinist
- Guido Santórsola (1904–1994), composer
- Hermann Scherchen (1891–1966), conductor
- Peter Schidlof (1922–1987)
- Ervin Schiffer (1932–2014)
- Hanning Schröder (1896–1987), composer
- Franz Schubert (1797–1828), composer
- Joseph Schubert (1754–1837), composer, violinist
- Rudolf Schwarz (1905–1994), conductor
- Leif Segerstam (1944–2024), conductor, composer, violinist
- Albert Seitz (1872–1937), composer
- Konstantin Sellheim (b. 1978)
- Tibor Serly (1901–1978), composer
- William Shield (1748–1829)
- Bernard Shore (1896–1985)
- Gilbert Shufflebotham (1907–1978), violinist
- Oscar Shumsky (1917–2000), violinist, conductor
- Paul Silverthorne (b. 1951)
- Robert Siohan (1894–1985), composer, conductor
- Nadia Sirota
- Hans Sitt (1850–1922)
- Scott Slapin (b. 1974), composer
- Kay Slocum
- Peter Slowik (b. 1957)
- Carolyn Sparey (b. 1960), composer
- Anton Stamitz (1750–c.1800), composer
- Carl Stamitz (1745–1801), composer
- Johann Stamitz (1717–1757), composer
- Helen Camille Stanley (1930–2021), composer
- Jean Stewart (1914–2002)
- Scott St. John (b. 1969)
- Nathaniel Stookey (b. 1970), composer
- Simon Streatfeild (1929–2019), conductor
- Jennifer Stumm
- Josef Suk (1929–2011), violinist
- Jean Sulem (b. 1959)
- Louis Svećenski (1862–1926)
- Gusztáv Szerémi (1877–1952), composer

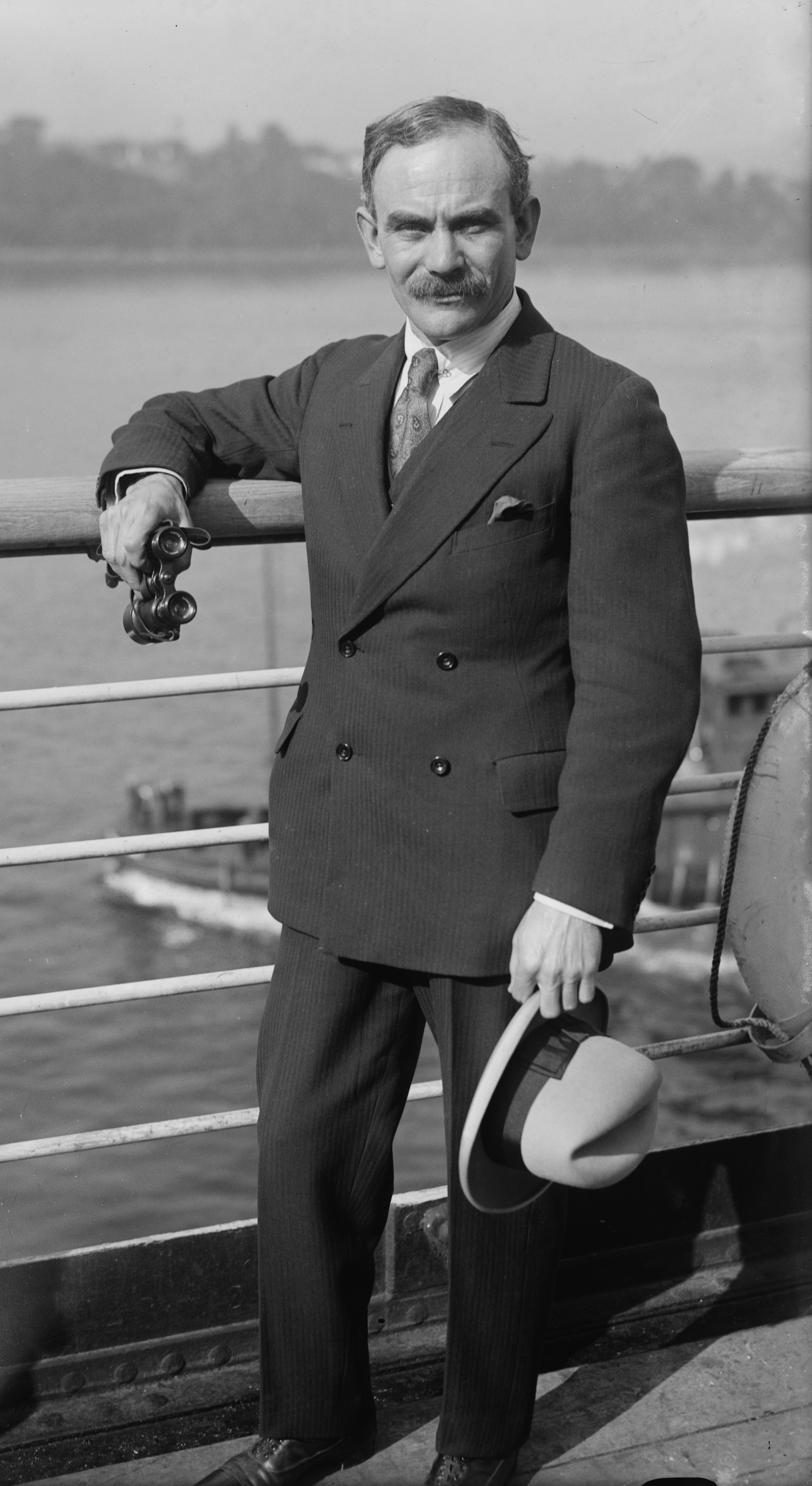
Lionel Tertis

=== T ===
- Robert Talbot (1893–1954), conductor, composer, violinist
- Václav Talich (1883–1961), conductor, violinist
- Antoine Tamestit (b. 1979)
- Will Taylor (b. 1968)
- Jan Tausinger (1921–1980), composer, conductor
- Arve Tellefsen, (b. 1936), violinist
- Yuri Temirkanov (1938–2023), conductor
- Mela Tenenbaum, violinist
- Lionel Tertis (1876–1975)
- Xaver Paul Thoma (b. 1953), composer
- Marcus Thompson (b. 1946)
- Katia Tiutiunnik (b. 1967), composer
- Lars Anders Tomter (b. 1959)
- Giuseppe Torelli (1658–1709), pedagogue, composer
- Sabine Toutain (b. 1966)
- Jacqueline Townshend (1912–1983), pianist, violinist
- Walter Trampler (1915–1997)
- Michael Tree (1934–2018)
- Anahit Tsitsikian (1926–1999), violinist, musicologist
- Karen Tuttle (1920–2010)

=== U ===
- Åke Uddén (1903–1987), composer, conductor
- Alfred Uhl (1909–1992)
- Chrétien Urhan (1790–1845)

=== V ===
- Nancy Van de Vate (1930–2023), composer, pianist
- Léon van Hout (1864–1945)
- Roland Vamos (b. 1930)
- Emanuel Vardi (1915–2011)
- Maxim Vengerov (b. 1974), violinist
- Robert Vernon (b. 1949)
- Maurice Vieux (1884–1951)
- Johann Georg Hermann Voigt (1769–1811), composer
- Hermann Voss (b. 1934)
- Ladislav Vycpálek (1882–1969), composer, violinist

=== W ===
- Louis van Waefelghem (1840–1908)
- Ernst Wallfisch (1920–1979)
- Geraldine Walther (b. 1950)
- Johann Baptist Wanhal (1739–1813)
- Maurice Ward (1899–1957)
- Harry Waldo Warner (1874–1945), composer
- Melia Watras
- John Webb (b. 1969), composer
- Hieronymus Weickmann (1825–1895)
- Justus Weinreich (1858–1927), composer
- Franz Weiss (1778–1830)
- Henryk Wieniawski (1835–1880), violinist
- Emanuel Wirth (1842–1923), violinist
- Lena Wood (1899–1982)
- Mark Wood

=== X ===
- Hong-Mei Xiao (b. 1963)
- Pierre-Henri Xuereb (b. 1959)

=== Y ===
- Eugène Ysaÿe (1858–1931), violinist

=== Z ===
- Bernard Zaslav (1926–2016)
- Wen Xiao Zheng (b. 1981)
- Grigori Zhislin (1945–2017), violinist
- Lev Zhurbin (b. 1978), composer
- Tabea Zimmermann (b. 1966)
- Fidelis Zitterbart (1845–1915), composer
- Đuro Živković (b. 1975), composer, violinist
- León Zuckert (1904–1992), composer, violinist
- Pinchas Zukerman (b. 1948), violinist

== See also ==
- Lists of musicians
