= Luigi Alberto Bianchi =

Italian violinist and violist (1945–2018)

- Born: 1 January 1945; Rimini, Italy
- Died: 3 January 2018 (aged 73)
- Genres: Classical music
- Occupations: Violinist; violist; teacher; conductor
- Instruments: Violin; Viola
- Years active: 1960s–2018

Luigi Alberto Bianchi (1 January 1945 – 3 January 2018) was an Italian violinist and violist.

== Life ==
Bianchi was born in 1945 in Rimini, into a musical family, and from the age of six, he had violin lessons.

The violin classes being oversubscribed at a music college in Rome, he instead studied viola; he later studied at the Accademia Nazionale di Santa Cecilia with the violist Renzo Sabatini. Sabatini arranged an audition with Yehudi Menuhin, who invited him to play at the Bath International Music Festival in 1968, and involved him in other music projects.

For eight years, Bianchi was a member of the Quartetto di Roma piano quartet, and he was principal viola at the Orchestra Sinfonica della RAI in Rome. He won the Carl Flesch competition in 1970, playing Walton's Viola Concerto in the presence of the composer. In 1973, he was appointed Professor of Viola at the University of Milan.

In 1980, his Amati viola, of 1595, known as the "Medicea", was stolen from his car in Milan. (It was recovered in 2006.) Unable to find another viola that he liked, his subsequent career was as a violinist. He bought a Stradivarius violin of 1692, and later the 1716 "Colossus" Stradivarius. In 1998, this was stolen (and remains missing); he then performed on both violin and viola.

He made recordings of music for violin and viola, sometimes both on the same disc. Recordings include Paganini's Sonata per la Grand Viola, Max Reger's three suites for viola, Sarasate's Spanish Dances Op. 23, and works by Nino Rota.

Bianchi taught in Europe and the US, and conducted. He was an authority on Paganini and wrote a book about Paganini's teacher Alessandro Rolla.
