= Maurice Vieux International Viola Competition =

The Maurice Vieux International Viola Competition (French: Le Concours International d'Alto Maurice Vieux) is an international music competition for viola players established in 1983 by the French viola society Les Amis de l'Alto. The competition is named for the French viola player and teacher Maurice Vieux.

== Maurice Vieux International Viola Competition ==
No.	Year	Location	1st Prize	2nd Prize	3rd Prize	Notes / Jurists
5	2000		(France) Antoine Tamestit (tie) (Romania) Aroa Sorin (tie)	— not awarded —	(United Kingdom) Lawrence Power	Marc-Olivier Dupin (Chairman), Gérard Caussé, Bruno Pasquier, Michaël Lévinas, Tabea Zimmermann, Thomas Riebl, Jesse Levine
4	1992	Ville Nouvelle de Melun-Sénart	—not awarded—	(Japan) Hiroto Tobisawa	(France) Benoît Marin	Michel Zbar(Chairman), Sabine Toutain, Emile Cantor, Serge Collot, Ulrich Koch, Yfrah Neaman, Dionisio Rodriguez Suarez
3	1989	Orléans	(Soviet Union) Andrei Gridchuk (Андрей Гридчук)	(Japan) Tomoko Ariu	(France) Pierre Lénert	Claude-Henry Joubert (Chairman), Yuri Bashmet, Marc Carles, Thomas A. Guilissen, Ulrich Koch, Bruno Pasquier, Tabea Zimmermann
2	1986	Lille	(Norway) Lars Anders Tomter	(France) François Schmitt (tie) (Romania) Teodor Coman (tie)	(France) Sabine Toutain	Betsy Jolas (Chairman), Emile Cantor, Claude Ducrocq, Paul Hadjaje, Georges Longrée, Erwin Schiffer, Maurice W. Riley
1	1983	Paris	(Germany) Tabea Zimmermann	(Romania) Marius Nichiteanu	(France) Pascal Cocheril	4th Prize: (France) Pascal Robault

== See also ==
- List of classical music competitions
- Lionel Tertis International Viola Competition
- Primrose International Viola Competition
