= Jodi Levitz =

American viola player and academic

Jodi Levitz is an American viola player and academic. She has performed throughout Europe, South America, the US, and the Far East as a solo violist and has recorded works for the viola on several record labels including Erato Records. She is the violist of the Ives Quartet.

She is currently on the viola and chamber music faculties at the Frost School of Music at the University of Miami and directs the Stamps Scholars program. She is also a faculty member of the Zephyr International Chamber Music Festival, held annually in Courmayeur, Italy.

She won first place in several competitions, including the D'Angelo Competition and the Hudson Valley Young Artists Competition. After receiving her Bachelor of Music and Master of Music degrees from the Juilliard School, she served for twelve seasons as the Principal and Solo Violist for the Italian chamber orchestra, I Solisti Veneti in addition to additional Principal positions at orchestras in Ferrara, Mantova, Tuscany, and Parma. She is fluent in Italian.

Her pedagogical lineage includes William Lincer, Paul Doktor, Dorothy DeLay, and Margaret Pardee.
