= Paul Rougnon =

French composer, pianist and music educator

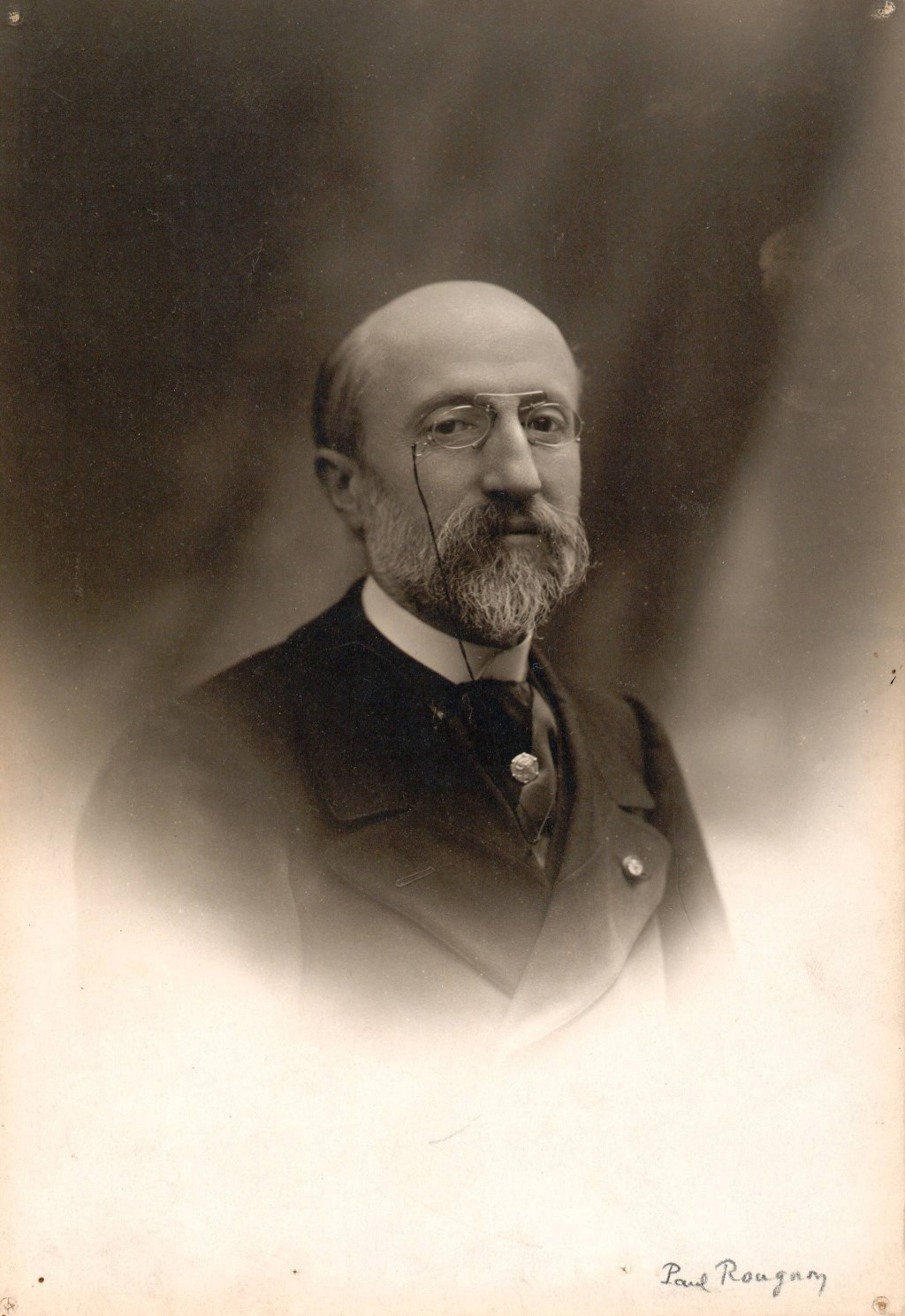
Paul Rougnon, 1895

Paul-Louis Rougnon (French pronunciation: [pɔl ʁuɲɔ̃]; 24 August 1846 – 11 December 1934) was a French composer, pianist and music educator.

== Biography ==
Paul Rougnon was born in Poitiers the son of Louis Rougnon and Claire Clotilde Robin. A student at the Lycée Bonaparte (now the Lycée Condorcet), he entered the Conservatoire de Paris in 1861 as an auditor, then a full-time student in 1862. He studied piano, music theory and composition with such masters as Édouard Batiste, François Bazin, Ambroise Thomas, Antoine François Marmontel and César Franck. He received degrees in music theory in 1865, harmony in 1868 and counterpoint in 1870.

In 1873, at age 27, Rougnon became a professor at the Conservatoire, then under the directorship of Ambroise Thomas. He taught music theory, counterpoint and fugue until his retirement in 1921. His students include Alfred Cortot, Yves Nat, Fernand Oubradous, Noël Gallon, and Henri Mulet. In addition to teaching, he was an administrator for the choral societies Orphéon and Sociétés musicales mutuelles. He composed choral works especially for these ensembles. After the turn of the century, he began to work with various magazines including Piano-Soleil, Le Monde Musical, Le Ménestrel, Le Monde Orphéonique and L'Harmonie.

As a prolific composer and writer, he composed more than 300 musical works in addition to literary and pedagogical volumes. He composed hundreds of piano pieces, two operas, some chamber music, and also vocal and choral works. In 1896, under the tenure of Théodore Dubois, the Conservatoire began the practice of charging composers to write contest pieces. Rougnon began composing works for this purpose, particularly for piano, viola, flute, and trumpet. His treatises on music theory and piano pedagogy are still in use today.

Rougnon received a gold medal for his collective works of music education at the 1900 Exposition Universelle in Paris. In 1911, he was made a Chevalier of the Légion d'honneur.

Rougnon married Marie-Louise de Beurmann in 1887 and had five children. He died on 11 December 1934 at his home in Saint-Germain-en-Laye.

== Selected works ==
=== Compositions ===
This is a list of compositions sorted by genre, opus number, date of composition (or publication), and title.

Genre	Opus	Date	Title	Scoring	Notes
Opera		1876	La Prima Donna		libretto by Lauzières de Thémines
Opera			Le Prince charmant		
Chamber music			Air de ballet	for oboe and piano	
Chamber music		1916	Allegro appassionato in D minor	for viola (or cello) and piano	
Chamber music		1879	Aragonaise	for violin and piano	original for piano solo
Chamber music		1900	2 Morceaux: 2. Allegro symphonique	for oboe (or violin) and piano	
Chamber music		1919	Barcarolle in G major	for flute (or violin) and piano	
Chamber music	138	1895	Concertino romantique in D minor	for viola (or violin) and piano	dedicated to violist Théophile Laforge
Chamber music		1921	Élégie		
Chamber music		1922	Fantaisie-Caprice in G major	for viola and piano	dedicated to violist Maurice Vieux
Chamber music			1^{er} Fantaisie de concert	for trumpet and piano	
Chamber music		1900?	Fantaisie de concert	for oboe and piano	
Chamber music		1902	4^{ème} Fantaisie de concert in G minor	for viola (or violin) and piano	
Chamber music			Grande étude de concert	for viola and piano	
Chamber music			Méditation	for violin (or cello) and piano or organ	
Chamber music		1911	4 Pièces archaïques concertantes: 1. Danza; 2. Passe-pied; 3. Toccata	for 2 violins and piano	
Chamber music			Polonaise de concert	for 2 trumpets and piano	
Chamber music			Prière		
Chamber music		1919	Rapsodie italienne	for flute (or violin) and piano	
Chamber music		1919	Sérénade in A major	for flute (or violin) and piano	dedicated to flautist René Le Roy
Chamber music			Sicilienne	for bass saxhorn, bugle, baritone or saxophone	
Chamber music	128	1895	1^{er} Solo in F major	for clarinet and piano	dedicated to clarinetist Cyrille Rose
Chamber music			1^{er} Solo de concert	for alto saxophone and piano	
Chamber music		1895	2^{ème} Solo de concert: 1. Berceuse; 2. Caprice	for alto saxophone and piano	"Ces deux parties s'enchaînent sans interruption ou peuvent être jouées séparément"
Chamber music			1^{er} Solo de concert	for trumpet or cornet and piano	
Chamber music	129	1895	2^{ème} Solo de concert in D minor	for trumpet and piano	"Imposé au Concours du Conservatoire de Paris (1895)"
Chamber music		1900	4^{ème} Solo de concert in F major	for trumpet and piano	"Imposé au Concours du Conservatoire de Paris (1913)"; dedicated to trumpeter Merri Franquin
Chamber music		1900	5^{ème} Solo de concert: Variations sur un thème original	for trumpet and piano	Fantaisie pastorale
Chamber music			8^{ème} Solo de concert	for trumpet and piano	
Chamber music			Suite de concert	for viola and piano	
Organ			2 Pièces	for organ	No. 1 in C, No. 2 in E
Piano	2		Caprice-Menuet, Menuet symphonique in G major	for piano	
Piano	4		Mazurka-Polonaise	for piano	
Pedagogical	12	1875	15 Études préparatoires de mécanisme et de style mélodiques et progressives	for piano	
Pedagogical	15	1874	24 Récréations instructives dans tous les tons majeurs et mineurs, Précédées de la gamme rythmée et d'un exercice dans le ton du morceau	for piano	
Pedagogical	21	1877	12 Études très faciles, Faisant suite aux méthodes	for piano	introduction to Op. 22
Pedagogical	22	1877	12 Études faciles sans octaves, Précédées d'exercises préparatoires et composées spécialement pour développer le mécanisme, le sentiment mélodique et rhythmique	for piano	introduction to Op. 23
Pedagogical	23	1877	12 Études chantantes de style et de mécanisme faisant suite aux Études faciles, Op. 22, Précédées d'exercices préparatoires	for piano	introduction to Op. 24
Piano	26	1877	15 Caprices-Études	for piano	dedicated to Ambroise Thomas
Piano	30		La Madgyare, Fantaisie-Caprice	for piano	
Piano	32		La Chant de la montagne	for piano	
Piano	35		Rêve maternal	for piano	
Piano		1879	Aragonaise	for piano	also for violin and piano
Piano	38	1879	La charmeuse, Polka-Mazurka	for piano	
Piano	46	1880	Historiette, Caprice	for piano	
Piano	47	1880	Le sommeil des fleurs, Nocturne	for piano	
Piano		1880	Fleurs et diamants, Caprice brillante	for piano	
Piano	52	1882	Souvenance, Gavotte	for piano	
Piano	55	1881	Caprice espagnol	for piano	
Piano		1881	Le Réveil de flore, Valse brillante	for piano	
Piano		1886	Au Village, Impromptu	for piano	
Piano		1886	Valse-Caprice	for piano	
Piano	80	1887	Gavotte	for piano	
Piano	81	1887	Chanson vénitienne	for piano	
Piano	82	1887	Marquis et Marquise, Souvenir d'autrefois	for piano	
Piano	88	1885	Perruque poudrée, Vieux style	for piano	
Piano	90	1885	Aragonaise	for piano	
Piano	91		Concert des anges, Nocturne brilliante	for piano	
Piano	93		Valse-Ballet, Morceau de salon	for piano	
Piano	96	1886	Scherzo-Valse, Morceau brilliante	for piano	
Piano	97		Tristezza, Chant de tristesse, Nocturne	for piano	
Piano	98		Allegrezza	for piano	
Piano	99		Valse des lutins, Morceau brilliante	for piano	
Piano	100	1887	Valse rêveuse	for piano	
Piano	101	1887	Menuet symphonique	for piano	
Piano	103		Ballerine, Air de ballet	for piano	
Piano	104		Astre des nuits, Nocturne	for piano	
Piano	105		Menuet de l'infante	for piano	
Piano	105		Valse-Rêverie	for piano	
Piano	106		Chanson de l'aïeule	for piano	
Piano	107		Valse joyeuse	for piano	
Piano	108		Mascarade	for piano	
Piano	109		Parmi le thym et le rosée, Idylle in A major	for piano	
Piano	110		Valse des fileuses	for piano	
Piano	111		Sous les tilleuls, Valse alsacienne	for piano	
Piano	115		Polichinelle	for piano	
Piano	117		Bagatelle	for piano	
Piano	120		4 Pièces faciles et brillantes sans octaves: 1. Danse bretonne 2. Rondo-Valse; 3. Ballade; 4. Galop	for piano 4-hands	
Piano	121		Gavotte Régence	for piano	
Piano	122		Valse arabesque	for piano	
Piano	123		Russia, Mazurka	for piano	
Piano	124		Menuet-Ballet	for piano	
Piano	125		Danse rustique	for piano	
Piano	126		Dans l'azur, Caprice	for piano	
Piano	128		Echos du nord, Mazurka	for piano	
Piano	129		Près du Ruisseau	for piano	
Piano	131		Mazurka rêveuse	for piano	
Piano	133		Chanson du Batelier	for piano	
Piano	136		Hymne	for piano	
Piano	141		Passe-pied de la reine	for piano	
Piano	141		Chants du cœur	for piano	
Piano	142		Les Cascatelles, Caprice brillante	for piano	
Piano	142		2^{ème} Valse-Caprice	for piano	
Piano	146		Valse expressive	for piano	
Piano	170	1899	Sérénade tendre	for piano	
Piano	171	1899	À Grenade, Danse espagnole	for piano	
Piano	200		Faintaisie-Valse	for piano	
Piano	220		6 Morceaux: 1. Sous la Ramée, Valse; 2. La Naïade, Caprice; 3. En rêvant, Romance; 4. Talons roses, Caprice-Gavotte; 5. En valsant, Fantaisie-Valse; 6. Balancelle, Caprice-Valse	for piano	
Piano	301	1912	Pour la saison nouvelle, 2 Pièces: 2. Chanson d'été	for piano	
Piano		1921	Danse ancienne in D minor	for piano	
Piano		1927	Les Harpes célestes, Caprice in G major	for piano	
Piano		1931	6^{ème} Mazurka in D major	for piano	
Piano		1930	1^{ère} Alsacienne in A major	for piano	may be played as a solo or simultaneously with 2^{ème} Alsacienne on a second piano
Piano		1930	2^{ème} Alsacienne in A major	for piano	may be played as a solo or simultaneously with 1^{ère} Alsacienne on a second piano
Piano			2^{e} Air de ballet	for piano	
Piano			Cantilène italienne	for piano	
Piano			Chanson espagnole in D minor	for piano	
Piano			Chant d'amour, Rêverie-Barcarolle in E♭ major	for piano	
Piano			Fleur de bruyères, Villanelle	for piano	
Piano			La Féria, Caprice espagnol in A minor	for piano	
Piano			Marche bosniaque in C major	for piano	
Vocal		1876	Le Bataillon de la reine	for voice and piano	words by François de Barghon Fort-Rion
Vocal		1879	Chant de Pâques	for voice and piano	words by L. Bridier; championed by tenor Jean-Alexandre Talazac
Vocal		1879	L'Assomption!	for voice and piano	words by L. Bridier
Vocal		1885	La Chanson du renouveau	for voice and piano	words by R. Laret
Vocal		1885	Le Souvenir	for voice and piano	words by P. Roussel
Vocal	99	1887	Gavotte-Marly	for voice and piano	....Théorie composée par De Soria
Vocal		1890	Pour Vous, Mélodie	for voice and piano	words by Léon Roger-Milès
Vocal		1904	Le Chant de la Mutualité, Prose rythmée	for voice and piano	words by the composer À Monsieur Léopold Mabilleau, Président de la Fédération Nationale des Sociétés de Secours Mutuels, Directeur du Musée Social
Vocal		1921	Les Enfants du Poitou!, Hymne patriotique poitevin	for voice and piano	words by the composer; Patriotic Hymn of Poitou
Vocal		1927	Aragonaise, Cantilène espagnole	for voice and piano	words by Louis Tiercelin
Vocal			Comment on dit: je t'aime	for voice and piano	words by Fernand Rougnon
Vocal			Coquelicots et bluets	for voice and piano	words by Louis Girard
Vocal			J'ai fait pleurer tes yeux...	for voice and piano	words by A. Saillard
Vocal			Je crois, j'aime, j'espère!, Mélodie	for voice and piano	words by Fernand Rougnon
Vocal			Le Rêveur et le passant	for voice and piano	words by Fernand Rougnon
Choral			Bois	for male chorus a cappella	
Choral			Cyclopes, Scène chorale	for male chorus a cappella	
Choral			En mer	for male chorus a cappella	
Choral			Enfants de la côte	for male chorus a cappella	
Choral			Enfants d'Orphée	for male chorus a cappella	
Choral			Enfants de St. Eloi	for male chorus a cappella	
Choral			Fin de moisson	for male chorus a cappella	
Choral			Fleur du matin	for male chorus a cappella	
Choral			Fraternité	for male chorus a cappella	
Choral			Gloire aux héros!	for male chorus a cappella	
Choral			Haut les cœurs!	for male chorus a cappella	words by H. A. Simon
Choral			Hymne à Paris (Vive Paris!), Scène chorale	for male chorus a cappella	
Choral			Hymne au drapeau	for male chorus a cappella	
Choral			Idylle	for male chorus a cappella	
Choral			Korrigans	for male chorus a cappella	
Choral			La Nuit aux champs	for male chorus a cappella	
Choral			Les Bateleurs	for male chorus a cappella	
Choral			Les Chants du jeune age pour garçons ou filles	for chorus and piano	
Choral			Les Flibustiers	for male chorus a cappella	
Choral			Les Laboureurs	for male chorus a cappella	words by René Brancour
Choral			Les Pêcheurs	for male chorus a cappella	
Choral			Les Penseurs	for male chorus a cappella	
Choral			Les Voix de la foule	for male chorus a cappella	
Choral		1873	Messe en Fa majeur à 3 voix	for chorus a cappella	premiered at L'église de Saint-Porchaire in Poitiers with subsequent performances in Paris on 6 June 1891 at Basilique du Sacré Cœur de Montmartre, in Rome at San Luigi dei Francesi, and at the Palace of Versailles
Choral			Poésie du soir	for male chorus a cappella	
Choral			Retour du Pôle	for male chorus a cappella	
Choral			Vers les Times	for male chorus a cappella	

=== Literary works ===
- Devoirs élémentaires de musique théorique et pratique en deux livres (Éditions Gallet)
- Dictées harmoniques à 2 parties (Heugel and Cie., 1914)
- Dictionnaire général de l'art musical (Éditions Delagrave, 1935)
- Dictionnaire musical des locutions étrangères (italiennes, allemandes, etc.) (c.1880, Éditions Delagrave, 1918, 1935)
- La Musique et son histoire (Librairie Garnier Frères, 1920)
- Le Mouvement et les nuances d'expression dans la musique (P. Dupont, 1893)
- Le Rythme et la mesure: Traité complet théorique, analytique & practique (Éditions Enoch et Cie.)
- Manuel de transposition musicale: étude de toutes les clés; appliquée aux instruments de musique et principalment au piano, à l'orgue, à la harpe (Heugel, 1912)
- Origines de la notation musicale moderne: Étude historique (1925)
- Petit dictionnaire de musique: termes musicaux usuels (Heugel, 1922)
- Petit dictionnaire liturgique de musique religieuse: théorique, pratique, historique (P. Lethielleux, 1921)
- Petite biographie des grands compositeurs (in 3 volumes) 1. École française 2. École italienne 3. École allemande (Éditions Margueritat, 1924)
- Souvenirs de 60 années de vie musicale et de 50 années de professorat au Conservatoire de Paris (Éditions Margueritat, 1925)

Pedagogical publications

- Cours de chant choral (Andrieu et Cie., 1924)
- Cours de piano élémentaire et progressif formant un cours complet de mécanisme (E. Gallet, 1899; Éditions M. Combre)
- Grandes études journalières de solfège à changement de clef (Éditions du Ménestrel, 1907)
- Mon piano: Hygiène du piano, Petit dictionnaire explicatif et historique des éléments constitutifs du piano (Éditions Fischbacher, 1921)
- Principes de la musique. Étude développée (Édition Delagrave, 1936)
- Solfège élémentaire: théorique, analytique et pratique à la portée des jeunes élèves (Éditions Combre)
- Solfège en 16 volumes (Éditions Combre)
- Traité pratique de prosodie dans la composition musicale et la déclamation lyrique (Éditions Enoch et Cie.)
- Traité pratique d'harmonie (Éditions Gallet)
