= Kay Slocum =

American musician and historian

Kay Brainerd Slocum is an American musician and historian who has published books in music and medieval history. Slocum is currently the Gerhold Professor of History and Humanities at Capital University, Ohio, prior to which she taught music history and viola at Kent State University. A violist, Slocum has performed with the Ohio Chamber Orchestra, the Buffalo Philharmonic Orchestra, the Erie Philharmonic, and the Youngstown Symphony. She currently plays with the ProMusica Chamber Orchestra.

== Select bibliography ==
- (2004) Liturgies in Honor of Thomas Becket USA: University of Toronto Press ISBN 0-8020-3650-3 excerpts online
- (2005) Medieval Civilisation. London: Laurence King Publishing ISBN 1-85669-444-5
- (2011) Sources in Medieval Culture and History USA: Prentice Hall ISBN 978-0-13-615726-7
- Bede’s Ladies: Images of Anglo-Saxon Holy Women on Thirteenth-Century Seals
