= Scottish Chamber Orchestra =

Edinburgh-based chamber orchestra

The Scottish Chamber Orchestra (SCO) is an Edinburgh-based UK chamber orchestra. One of Scotland's five National Performing Arts Companies, the SCO performs throughout Scotland, including annual tours of the Scottish Highlands and Islands and South of Scotland. The SCO appears regularly at the Edinburgh, East Neuk, St Magnus and Aldeburgh Festivals and The Proms. The SCO's international touring receives support from the Scottish Government. The SCO rehearses mainly at Edinburgh's Queen's Hall.

== History ==
The SCO was formed in 1974, with Roderick Brydon as its first principal conductor, from 1974 to 1983. The founding leader of the SCO was John Tunnell, and by 1977 he had been joined by Carolyn Sparey as principal viola, and Haflidi Halgrimsson as principal cello. The first Manager of the Scottish Chamber Orchestra in 1974 was Ursula Richardson. Michael Storrs came from London as the second Manager in mid-1978 in time for the SCO's visit with Scottish Opera to the Aix-en-Provence Festival, the schedule, which for a while included work as the orchestra for Scottish Opera, offered a full diary of concert performances, recordings and touring. In 1978 there was a tour to Hungary, Romania and Bulgaria, as well as the first of two summers as orchestra in residence for the festival in Aix-en-Provence. A year later a tour of the Scottish Highlands and islands was the first of its kind ever to take place on the islands of the West coast of Scotland, and was followed by the official opening by Queen Elizabeth II of the Queen's Hall in Edinburgh on July 6.

A highlight of the year 1980 was a BBC TV recording with Raymond Leppard of all six Brandenburg Concertos and over the next couple of years the relentless schedule continued with concerts in Barcelona, a residency in the Scottish Highlands, performances at the St. Magnus Festival in Orkney, a recording of Vivaldi's Four Seasons with violinist Jaimie Laredo, tours of the UK and Europe with mezzo soprano Teresa Berganza, concerts with the Polish conductor, Jerzy Maksymiuk, and an introduction to the up and coming young English conductor, Simon Rattle in a concert involving the American opera singer, Jessye Norman.

Other principal conductors have included Jukka-Pekka Saraste (1987–1991) and Ivor Bolton (1994–1996). The American violinist and conductor Joseph Swensen served as principal conductor from 1996 to 2005, and is now the SCO's conductor emeritus. Sir Charles Mackerras held the position of conductor laureate until his death in 2010. The Estonian conductor Olari Elts served as the SCO's principal guest conductor from October 2007 to September 2010. Robin Ticciati was principal conductor from 2009 to 2018. with an initial contract of 3 years. Emmanuel Krivine became the SCO's principal guest conductor in September 2015.

In March 2018, Maxim Emelyanychev first guest-conducted the SCO, as an emergency substitute for Ticciati. Based on this appearance, in May 2018, the SCO announced the appointment of Emelyanychev as its sixth principal conductor, effective with the 2019-2020 season. In November 2019, the SCO announced the extension of Emelyanychev's contract as principal conductor through 2025. In April 2023, the SCO announced an additional extension of Emelyanychev's contract as principal conductor through "at least 2028". In April 2026, the SCO announced the most recent extension of Emelyanychev's contract as principal conductor through "at least 2031".

In 2023 members of the orchestra were selected to play at the coronation of Charles III and Camilla.

== Contemporary music ==
The SCO's work in contemporary music has included collaborations with Gordon Crosse, John McLeod, and Peter Maxwell Davies, notably the series of Strathclyde Concertos. Einojuhani Rautavaara's Autumn Gardens received its world premiere with the SCO in 1999. The SCO premiered Sally Beamish's Concerto for Orchestra (Sangsters) in November 2002. The SCO has commissioned over 100 new works, from composers including Peter Maxwell Davies (the SCO's Composer Laureate), Mark-Anthony Turnage, Judith Weir, Sally Beamish, Karin Rehnqvist, Lyell Cresswell, James MacMillan, Hafliði Hallgrímsson, Einojuhani Rautavaara, Stuart MacRae, Edward Harper and Martin Suckling (appointed SCO Associate Composer in 2013).

The SCO has recorded for a number of labels, including Deutsche Grammophon and Hyperion. It has a recording partnership with the Glasgow-based record company, Linn Records, with whom it has recorded 12 albums, including several recordings of Mozart symphonies conducted by Sir Charles Mackerras and an album of Berlioz conducted by Ticciati.

== Principal conductors ==
- Roderick Brydon (1974–1983)
- Jukka-Pekka Saraste (1987–1991)
- Ivor Bolton (1994–1996)
- Joseph Swensen (1996–2005)
- Robin Ticciati (2009–2018)
- Maxim Emelyanychev (2019–present)

Past SCO chief executives have included Roy McEwan-Brown. In April 2016, the SCO announced the appointment of Gavin Reid as its current chief executive, effective 29 August 2016.
