= Pierre Lénert =

French violist (born 1966)

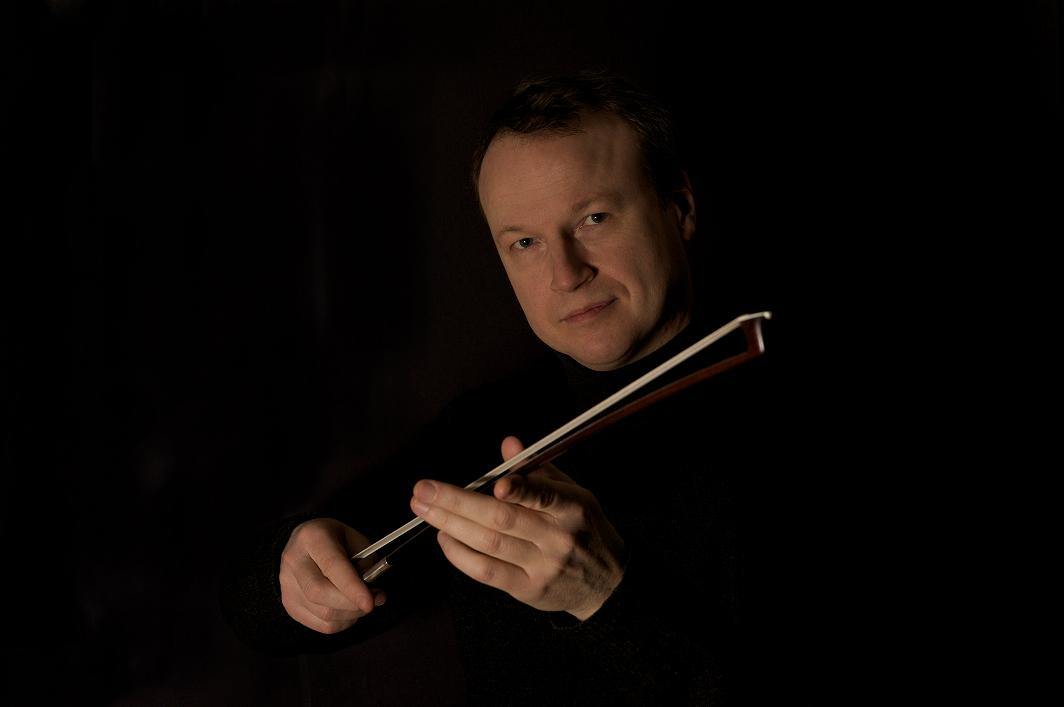
Pierre Lénert (2009)

Pierre Lénert (born in 1966) is a French violist. An international concertist, he is first solo violist of the Orchestre de l'Opéra national de Paris.

== Biography ==
Pierre Lénert regularly performs in large concert halls: the Queen Elizabeth Hall in London, the Centre for Fine Arts, Brussels, the Tchaikovski hall in Moscow, the Brick Hall in Nagasaki, the salle Pleyel, the Théâtre du Châtelet, the Théâtre des Champs-Élysées, the Palais Garnier in Paris, the Concertgebouw of Amsterdam etc.

Born in France to a family of musicians, Pierre Lénert had his own father Jean Lenert as his first master. He then studied with Kim Kashkashian in Luxemburg, Yuri Bashmet in France and Hatto Beyerle in Germany.

Pierre Lénert has won major international competitions: "Markneukirchen" (Germany), Maurice Vieux International Viola Competition (France) and Lionel Tertis competition (Isle of Mann, Great-Britain). He was sponsored by the Philipp Morris foundation and the Yehudi Menuhin foundation.

Pierre Lénert plays with outstanding orchestras such as the Orchestre National de Paris, the Hungarian Radio Orchestra, the Sofia Philharmonic Orchestra, the Kyushu Symphony Orchestra, the Orchestra of the Camerata of Athens, the Orchestra of the Gran Teatro del Liceu, etc.... under the direction of Philippe de Chalendar, Frédéric Chaslin, Myung Wung Chung, Edmon Colomer, James Conlon, Armin Jordan, Jacques Mercier, Fumiaki Miyamoto... he also played the Sinfonia Concertante for Violin, Viola and Orchestra (Mozart) alongside Augustin Dumay.

His international career as a chamber musician began with the Marlboro Music School and Festival (in the U.S) where he played alongside Rudolf Serkin, Paul Tortelier, David Soyer, and Isidore Cohen. Since then he appeared at the Georges Enesco festival (Bucarest), Kuhmo (Finland), BBC Proms Chamber Music London), at the Schubertiade (Austria) alongside Joshua Bell, Jeff Cohen, Martin Fröst, Isabelle Faust, Alban Gerhardt, Marie Hallynck, Nelly Decamp, Hervé Joulain, Patrick Messina, Viktoria Mullova, Nicolas Stavy, Alexandre Tharaud, Cédric Tiberghien, the Danel Quartet... In 2005 Pierre Lénert founded the chamber music festival "Sérénade" at Surgères (France), of which he is the artistic director.

He participates in the creation of new scores, such as those of Michiru Oshima (Concerto for viola "Voix de la Vie"), Marc Bleuse, Edison Denisov, Antoine Duhamel, Thierry Pecou, and Ian Wilson.

Pierre Lénert has recorded for EMI Classics, Erato, Arion, Syrius, Sonogramme and Intégral Classic.

His CD Classic-Sonogramme "Rhapsodie" with Cédric Tiberghien (2008) has been widely rewarded by the press (9 stars of Classica, 5 keys in Diapason, 4 stars of the Monde de la Musique.)

Pierre Lénert won the Académie Charles-Cros prize at EMI and the Diapason d'Or of the year 2000 at Arion.

In 1988, he was appointed to the position of "First Alto SuperSoloist". of the Orchestraof the Opéra national de Paris, of which he is still the incumbent.

Pierre Lénert played a viola by Jean-Baptiste Vuillaume dated 1865 from 1993 until 2023 when it was sold to the Anne-Sophie Mutter Foundation via Tarisio private sales.

== Discography ==
Publications by the labels, EMI Classics, Erato, Integrale Classic, Syrius, Arion, Saphir, Chandos and Sonogramme, the following recordings:

- 2017: Paganini's Complete Caprices, Pierre Lenert viola (Paraty)
- 2013: Mélodies, works by Prokofiev, Tchaikovsky, Debussy - Jeff Cohen, piano (Continuo Classic)
- 2012: Shostakovitch, Sonatas for viola, Op. 147; Sonata for cello, opus 40 - Éliane Reyes, piano (Integral Classic)
- 2010: Beethoven - with Patrick Gallois, Jeff Cohen and the soloists of the Paris Opera (Integral Classic)
- 2008: Rhapsodie, works by Enesco, Françaix, Milhaud - Cédric Tiberghien, piano (Sonogramme/Integral Classic)
- 2006: "Tribute to Paul Tortelier", works by Paul Tortelier with Paul Tortelier… (Chandos)
- 2001: Paganini, works by Paganini - Cyril Lacrouts, cellist; Nelly Decamp, guitar (Syrius)
- 2000: Albert Roussel, Integral of the flute work - Mathieu Dufour, flute… (Saphir)
- 2000: "Reinecke" - Carol Robinson, clarinet; Jeff Cohen, piano (Syrius)
- 1999: Camille Saint-Saëns, Le Carnaval des Animaux - Alexandre Tharaud, piano; Claude Pieplu, narrator, etc. (Arion)
- 1999: "Hummel-Mendelssohn-Schubert" recital - Jeff Cohen, piano (Syrius)
- 1997: Henri Vieuxtemps, Integral of the work for viola and piano - Jeff Cohen, piano (Syrius)
- 1993: "Musique française pour harpe" - Markus Klinko, harp and the soloists of the Paris Opera (EMI Classics)
- 1992: "Merry Christmas" - Simion Stanciu, Alexandre Lagoya, Marielle Nordmann (Erato)
