= Pemi Paull =

Pemi Paull is a Canadian viola soloist, music educator, and chamber musician, known for a wide range of musical activities,

== Career ==
Paull founded and is artistic director of Warhol Dervish, an original and unorthodox chamber music collective based in Montreal, Quebec. He is a member of Ensemble Caprice, with whom he has recorded seven discs for Analekta, winning a Juno Award in the process, as well as Daniel Taylor's Theatre of Early Music. He plays a "viola built in 1789 by the Parisian luthier...Leopold Renaudin.

Paull's activities have brought him to the forefront of Canada's contemporary music world, where he is a member of two important new music ensembles, Bradyworks and SMCQ. In addition, he has premiered works for viola by composers including Scott Godin, Andre Ristic, Rose Bolton, Emily Hall, and Nicolas Gilbert, Michael Oesterle, and Tim Brady.

Paull frequently collaborates with musicians outside of the classical world, including Richard Reed Parry of Arcade Fire, Chilly Gonzales, Patrick Watson, Lukas Ligeti, and has recorded with artists like Socalled, Barr Brothers, Hey Rosetta, to name a few. Paull is one of the few violists in the world to present full programs of unaccompanied repertoire for viola, covering more than three centuries, from the early baroque to new commissions.

His first solo album, Musicum Umbrarum was released in November, 2018 on Métis Island records.

Pemi has been president of the Canadian Viola Society since June 2016.

== Performance examples ==
- Bach Passacaglia
