= Will Taylor (musician) =

- Born: 30 November 1968 (age 56)
- Origin: Austin, Texas, United States
- Genres: Jazz, jazz fusion, swing, western swing, folk, rock, pop
- Occupation(s): Musician, composer, arranger, producer
- Instrument: Viola
- Years active: 1987–present
- Labels: Amazing Records, Strings Attached Music, Igmod, Cymekob
- Website: www.stringsattached.org,www.stringarrangementsbywilltaylor.com,www.youtube.com/willtaylorsmusic, celebratewithstringsattached.com

Will Taylor (born 30 November 1968) is an American violist, violinist, arranger, composer, record producer and guitarist and from Austin, Texas. He is the founder of the groups Will Taylor & Strings Attached and The Jazz Menagerie.

== Early life ==
Taylor graduated from Austin High School. He then attended the Sarah and Ernest Butler School of Music at the University of Texas at Austin.

== Career ==
Taylor is one of few viola players in jazz. He began his career playing jazz fusion in clubs on 6th Street in Austin, Texas during his college years. After that, he worked with Eddie Harris and the Turtle Island Quartet. Additionally, he has spent 23 years playing with the Austin Lyric Opera. He also spent time doing solo work, releasing three albums: Reel Life (1993, Amazing), Simple Gifts (1995, Igmod), and Live from Austin (1996, Cymekob, Inc.) The three albums received airtime on National Public Radio stations.

=== Will Taylor and Strings Attached ===
In 1999, Taylor began collaborating extensively with other Austin artists. Most of the collaborations were jazz, although some were considered more pop. He began collaborating regularly with different artists, but often bringing in the same people. These people eventually formed under the band name Will Taylor & Strings Attached.

The band currently includes:

- Will Taylor (viola)
- Steve Zirkel (bass and muted trumpet)
- Jason McKenzie (percussion)
- Shawn Sanders (cello)
- Glenn Rexach (guitar)

The group has collaborated with artists such as Eliza Gilkyson, Slaid Cleaves, Shawn Colvin, Ian Moore, and Pearl Jam.

== Discography ==
=== Solo work ===
- Reel Life (1993, Amazing)
- Simple Gifts (1995, Igmod)
- Live from Austin (1996, Cymekob, Inc.)

=== Will Taylor and Strings Attached ===
- Will Taylor and Strings Attached (2000)
- A Bride's Collection of Traditional Classical Wedding Music (2006)
- Collaborations (2005, Heart)
- A Christmas Collection from Will Taylor and Strings Attached (2007)
- A Live Tribute to Led Zeppelin (2007)
- All Beatles Covers Live, Vol. 1 (2007)
- Back to the Garden: A Tribute to Joni Mitchell (2007)
- All Beatles Covers, Vol. 2 (2007)
- Songs of Leonard Cohen: Live (2008)
- Acoustic Rubber Soul - Songs of the Beatles (2009)
