= Carolyn Sparey =

- Born: 1946 12 28
- Education: Royal Academy of Music. London
- Known for: Viola player, composer and author
- Style: Classical
- Website: https://www.carolynspareyfox.com

Carolyn Sparey Fox (born 28 December 1946) has successfully embraced a number of art forms during her long career as a professional viola player, a career which began in London during the 1970s and culminated in Scotland.

== Early life ==
Carolyn and her brother were born to amateur musician parents and raised in a Christian household. During the war her parents home and father's dental practice were destroyed during the London bombing raids and they decided to settle in Keswick, Lake District.

"As a child I was very much in love with Jesus; at the age of eight I enjoyed writing ‘sermons’ and psalms, and arranging services in my bedroom to which the members of my family, and any passing visitor, were invited."

== Education ==
Sparey went to Keswick Grammar School and studied at Royal Academy of Music.

== Career ==
Sparey played at the London Sinfonietta, the Academy of St Martins in the Field, the English Chamber Orchestra. In the mid nineteen seventies Carolyn was invited to become principal viola with the Scottish Chamber Orchestra, based in Edinburgh and the BBC Scottish Symphony Orchestra. She started composing after leaving the BBCSSO.

In December 1981, Sparey performed Bruckner's String Quintet on the viola with the Fitwilliam Quartet in London.

In 1984, Sparey played with the BBC Scottish Symphony Orchestra at St Magnus Cathedral in Kirkwall, Orkney as part of two St. Magnus Festival concerts under the conductor, Jerzy Maksymiuk. Sparey played viola on the Mozart Sinfonia Concertante as house soloist.

In 1986, Sparey played rebec at the Burrell Collection as part of a programme of mid-15th century music of the Burgundian court.

In 1991 Sparey was invited to take up a position with the BBC orchestra in Glasgow, where she moved back to Scotland with her family after living in Durham.

Aside from music, Sparey is the author of 6 published books. With the most recent of these books being illustrated children's books; Little Acorn (2021), Abdu'l-Bahá's Little Brown Cat (2021), and Leili and the Blue Balloon (2023). Previously, Sparey has written on Bahá’ísm and published the letters and diaries of her parents.

== Personal life ==
Sparey has a son with her first husband Rob Gillies. She has been married to Jeremy Fox since 2000, who wrote a study of the Letter to the Christians.

In June 1992 Carolyn converted to Bahá’ísm.
