= Paul Doktor =

Paul Doktor (March 28, 1917 in Vienna – June 21, 1989 in New York City) was a notable violist and orchestra conductor.

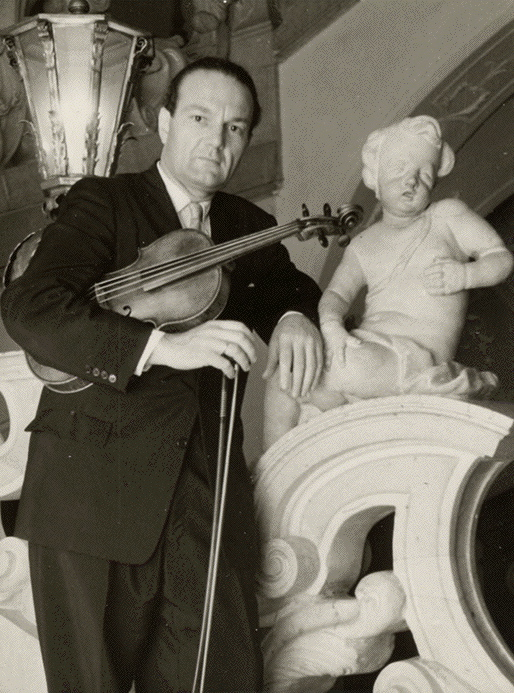
Paul Doktor.

The son of singer-pianist Georgine and violist Karl Doktor, at the age of five, Paul began violin studies with his father, and received his diploma from the State Academy of Music in 1938. While still in his teens, he toured as a violinist with the Adolf Busch Chamber Orchestra, but the youthful performer's mastery of the viola came to the fore when, at a few days' notice, he was asked to take over from the ailing second violist in a performance of a Mendelssohn Quintet with the Busch Quartet. His achievement was so remarkable that he was invited to join the Quartet in presenting a series of Mozart quintets at London's Wigmore Hall. From then on, Paul Doktor stuck to the instrument fate had chosen for him, and became the first violist ever to have been awarded unanimously the First Prize at the International Music Competition in Geneva. He left Vienna in 1938 and from 1939 to 1947 was solo violist with the Lucerne Symphony Orchestra. He moved to the United States in 1947 and became an American citizen in 1952.

His American debut at the Library of Congress in Washington, D.C. was certainly auspicious: "Not for many years has so competent a master of the viola been heard in American concert halls", commented the Washington Post. From then on, he appeared widely as recitalist, soloist with orchestras and as a chamber musician. Paul Doktor was equally at home with the baroque, classical and modern repertoires. With Yaltah Menuhin, he introduced to American audiences a concerto by J.C.F. Bach for viola, pianoforte and orchestra, which he had discovered in Paris. He gave the world premiere of Quincy Porter's Concerto for Viola and Orchestra at the Columbia University American Music Festival and recorded Walter Piston's Viola Concerto with the Louisville Orchestra for their First Edition Record series. He also played the BBC premiere of Wilfred Josephs' concertante ("Mediatio di Beornmundo"), which he repeated for its American premiere in New York.

In addition to his solo career, Paul Doktor was a founder-member of the Rococo Ensemble, the New York String Sextet, The New String Trio of New York, with whom he recorded the Max Reger and Frank Martin string trios, and the Duo Doktor-Menuhin. Extensive tours took the Duo all over the United States and Alaska. They also joined forces in making four television films about the viola for the National Educational Network; these comprise rarely performed music by Marais, Telemann, Dittersdorf, Beethoven, Schubert, Schumann, Hummel, Berlioz, Brahms and Flackton. Many of these works were edited by Paul Doktor. Paul was often joined by Yaltah in demonstration lectures and string seminars, which he gave at the Eastman School of Music and the University of Missouri.

When not performing, he was a faculty member at the Juilliard School, The Mannes College of Music and New York University. He also taught at the Philadelphia Musical Academy and Farleigh Dickinson University and was a guest professor at the Conservatoire de musique du Québec à Montréal. In appreciation of his diverse educational activities, he was recipient of the 1977 "Artist-Teacher of the Year" award, given annually by the American String Teachers Association to one outstanding contributor to string pedagogy in the world.

A former student of Doktor, Adam Crane, has begun compiling unpublished edits to Doktor's viola editions, including the Carl Stamitz Concerto in D Major.
