= William Flackton =

English bookseller, viola player and composer

William Flackton (bap. 27 March 1709 – 5 January 1798) was an 18th-century bookseller, publisher, amateur organist, viola player and composer. He is perhaps best known today for his compositions for the viola.

Flackton was born in Canterbury and was the eldest surviving son of John Flackton and Catharine Sharp. He demonstrated a talent for music from an early age and at the age of nine he was admitted as a chorister at Canterbury Cathedral.

He was apprenticed to the Canterbury bookseller Edward Burges until 1730 when he set up his own business as a stationer and bookseller specialising in the second-hand and antiquarian book trade. He was in partnership with his brother John from 1738 and later traded in partnership with two of his former apprentices, first as Flackton and Marrable from 1774 and as Flackton, Marrable and Claris from 1784. The ESTC Database records over 60 books published by the firm.

In 1770, he published his Six Solos, Three for a Violoncello and Three for a Tenor, Accompanied Either with a Violoncello or Harpsichord, dedicated to Sir William Young, Lieutenant-Governor of Dominica. In the Preface, Flackton shows that he wanted to promote music for the viola.

The Solos for a Tenor Violin are intended to shew that Instrument in a more conspicuous Manner, than it has hitherto been accustomed; the Part generally allotted to it being little more than a dull Ripiano, an Accessory or Auxiliary, to fill up or compleat the Harmony in Full Pieces of MUSIC; though it must be allowed, that at some particular Times, it has been permitted to accompany a Song, and likewise to lead in a Fugue; yet even then, it is assisted by one, or more Instruments in the Unisons or Octaves, to prevent, if possible, its being distinguished from any other Instrument; or, if it happens to be heard but in so small a Space as a Bar or two, 'tis quickly overpowered again with a Crowd of Instruments and lost in Chorus.

Such is the Present State of this Fine Toned Instrument, owing, in some Measure, to the Want of Solos, and other Pieces of MUSIC, properly adapted to it.

The Author takes this Opportunity of acknowledging his particular Obligations to Mr. ABEL, for inspecting this Work in Manuscript before it went to the Press; the Publication of which, it is hoped, may be productive of other Works of this Kind from more able Hands, and establish a higher Veneration and Taste for this excellent, tho' too much neglected Instrument.

Flackton was the organist at the church of St Mary of Charity in Faversham between 1735 and 1752. He had a particular interest in church music which is demonstrated by his collection of music manuscripts, now held in the British Library. One of the more significant of Flackton's church compositions is Hymns for Three Voices which was composed in support of the Sunday school movement. Non-church music composed by Flackton includes A Glorious Chase in F major for three voices and horn, which he composed for the Canterbury Catch Club. Some of his works are used as examination pieces by many music schools.

== Bibliography ==
- Sarah Gray, "Flackton, William (bap. 1709, d. 1798)", in Oxford Dictionary of National Biography, ed. H. C. G. Matthew and Brian Harrison (Oxford: OUP, 2004)
