= Adolfo Alejo =

Mexican violinist, violist and conductor

Adolfo Alejo (born 1986) is a Mexican violinist, violist and conductor. He was named one of the most creative Mexicans in the world by Forbes Magazine in 2019.

== Career ==
An artist under Brilliant Classics and Naxos Labels, Alejo has performed and conducted with orchestras around the globe including: orchestra de Cámara de Bellas Artes, Camerata of Coahuila, Baskent Chamber Orchestra, Nuevo León Symphony Orchestra, Kalisz Filharmonic, Opole Filharmonic, Capella Bidgostiensis, Radom Chamber Orchestra, Voronezh Symphony Orchestra, Sinfonica Rossini, Filharmonica della Calabria, Berliner Camerata, Matera Conservatory Symphony Orchestra, Youth Orchestra of Catalunya, the Hunan Symphony Orchestra, Lake Como Philharmonic Orchestra, Braga Philharmonic, Lugansk Philharmonic Orchestra and Brno Philharmonic Orchestra among others.

His recordings include a live DVD from the Berliner Philharmonie Kammermusiksaal and a double Album "Music for Violin and Viola" on Brilliant Classics Label, featuring some of the most important repertoire for violin and viola.

== Prizes ==
- 2001 Hermilo Novelo National Violin Competition UNAM (2nd Prize)
- 2004 Hermilo Novelo National Violin Competition UNAM (2nd Prize)
- 2006 Hermilo Novelo National Violin Competition UNAM (3rd Prize)
- 2009 New York University String Quartet Competition (1st Prize and Audience Choice Winner)
- 2017 José Maria Morelos Y Pavon Medal (Excellence in Arts and Education)
- 2018 Claustro Doctoral Ibero Americano (Doctor Honoris Causa)
