= Maurice Vieux =

French violist (1884–1951)

Maurice Edgard Vieux (14 April 1884 in Savy-Berlette near Valenciennes – 28 April 1951 in Paris) was a French violist whose teaching at the Conservatoire de Paris plays a key role in the history of the viola in France.

Vieux received his 1st Prize Viola in 1902 in the class of Théophile Laforge, the first viola professor of the Conservatoire de Paris. Thereafter, he was principal violist of the Opéra National de Paris (1907–1949) and the Orchestre de la Société des Concerts du Conservatoire, and member of the Quatuor Parent and Quatuor Touche. In 1918, he replaced LaForge as professor of viola at the Conservatoire.

Vieux composed several works for the viola, notably his Vingt Études pour Alto (20 Études for Viola) published by Alphonse Leduc in 1927.

The Maurice Vieux International Viola Competition (Le Concours International d'Alto Maurice Vieux) was established in 1983 by the French viola society Les Amis de l'Alto. The first-prize winner was the German violist Tabea Zimmermann.

In 2022, the Italian violist Marco Misciagna released the world premiere recording of all works for solo viola by Maurice Vieux.

== Compositions ==
- 20 Études for viola solo (1927); Éditions Alphonse Leduc
- 10 Études sur des traits d'orchestre (1928); Éditions Alphonse Leduc
- Scherzo for viola and piano (1928); Éditions Alphonse Leduc
- 6 Études de concert for viola and piano (1928–1932); Éditions Alphonse Leduc; Éditions Max Eschig; Associated Music Publishers
- 10 Études sur les intervalles for viola solo (1931); Éditions Alphonse Leduc

== Dedications ==
- Max Bruch – Romanze for viola and orchestra, Op. 85 (1911)
- Henri Büsser – Catalane sur des airs populaires for viola and orchestra or piano, Op. 78 (1926)
- Henri Büsser – Rhapsodie arménienne sur des thèmes populaire in B minor for viola and piano, Op. 81 (1930)
- Gabriel Grovlez – Romance, Scherzo et Finale for viola and piano (1932)
- Reynaldo Hahn – Soliloque et forlane for viola and piano (1937)
- Désiré-Émile Inghelbrecht – Impromptu in F minor for viola and piano (1922)
- Joseph Jongen – Allegro appassionato for viola and piano or orchestra, Op. 79 (1925)
- Joseph Jongen – Introduction et danse for viola and piano or orchestra, Op. 102 (1935)
- J. M. L. Maugüé – Allègre, lent et scherzo for viola and orchestra (1927)
- Paul Rougnon – Fantaisie-Caprice in G major for viola and piano (1922)
