= Antonio Rolla =

Italian composer (1798–1837)

Giuseppe Antonio Rolla
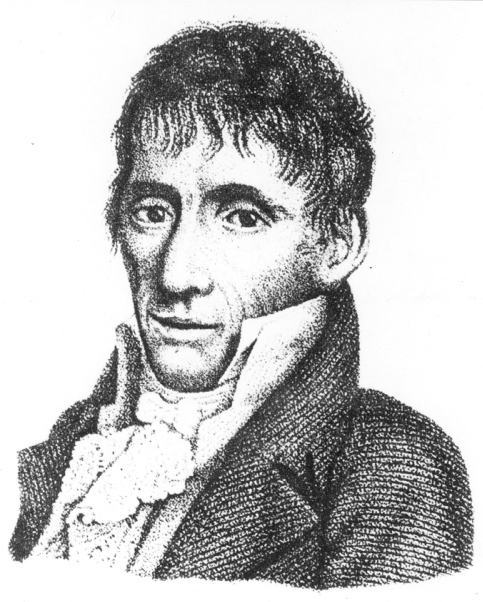
- Antonio Rolla
- Born: April 18, 1798; Parma, Italy
- Died: March 19, 1837 (aged 38); Dresden, Germany
- Occupations: Violist; composer
- Years active: 1807–1836

Giuseppe Antonio Rolla (18 April 1798 – 19 March 1837) was an Italian violin and viola virtuoso and composer.

== Life and career ==
Antonio Rolla was born in Parma, Italy, where he studied violin with his father, composer Alessandro Rolla. In 1803 the family moved to Milan where Rolla began to work at a young age. He became a violinist with the Teatro di Pavia in the spring of 1807, but lost the post with the fall of the Napoleonic Empire in 1814. Having maintained contacts with the town of his birth, Rolla presented a concert at the Teatro Ducale in Parma on 11 June 1818. In a letter written in 1820, Niccolò Paganini praised Rolla's ability after they had played violin duets at the request of his father. In 1821, Rolla became the concertmaster of the Teatro Comunale in Bologna and performed along with his father at the Teatro alla Scala in Milan in 1823. The same year, he accepted the position of concertmaster at the Staatskapelle in Dresden on the recommendation of Paganini. Rolla contracted an illness in 1836 and died the following year in Dresden at the age of 38.

Rolla was highly regarded as an instrumentalist and composed a few works, notably for violin and viola, of which the most famous are the posthumously published 24 Cadenzas for solo violin.

== Selected works ==
- Sinfonia (1816)
- Concerto a violino (1817)
- Divertimento a flauto (1818)
- 12 Valzer (12 Waltzes) for string orchestra, Op.1
- Rondò alla polacca for violin and orchestra, Op.3
- Variazioni for violin and string trio, Op.10
- Variazioni brillanti in F for viola and orchestra, Op.13 (1822)
- Terzo rondò alla polacca preceduto da un Adagio di introduzione for violin and string orchestra, Op.15
- Tema variato for violin and string quintet or string orchestra
- Divertimento for 2 violins and orchestra
- Variazioni for violin and orchestra
- Introduzione e variazioni sopra un tema dell'opera 'La Gazza ladra' di Rossini for violin and string quartet or orchestra
- Andante con variazioni for viola and orchestra
- 6 Piccole pastorale (6 Idylles) for viola solo (1836–1837)
- Esercizi (Exercises) for violin solo
- Studi (Studies) for violin solo
- 24 Cadenze (24 Cadenzas) for violin solo

== Sources ==
- Famiglia Rolla al Dizionario della musica di Parma (in Italian)
