= Hermann Ritter =

German violist, composer and music historian (1849 - 1926)

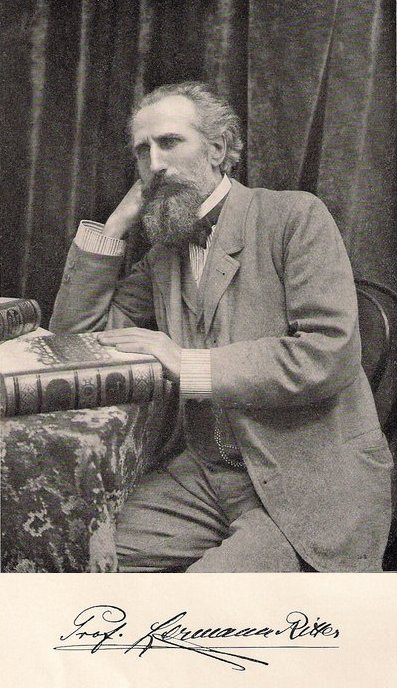
- Ritter (c. 1905)
- Born: 16 September 1849; Wismar, Mecklenburg-Vorpommern, Germany
- Died: 25 January 1926 (aged 76); Würzburg, Bavaria, Germany
- Occupations: Viola player, composer and music historian

Hermann Ritter (16 September 1849 in Wismar – 25 January 1926 in Würzburg) was a German viola player, composer and music historian.

== Biography ==
Hermann Ritter studied violin at the Neue Akademie für Musik in Berlin from 1865 to 1870. His outstanding talent was soon recognized, and he was appointed music director of the municipal orchestra in Heidelberg, where he also continued his education at the University of Heidelberg. During this time, his interest in performance shifted from the violin to the viola, with the intention of improving the status of the violist by raising the standard of performance and developing an instrument with a tone equal to that of the violin and cello.

Besides musical compositions and transcriptions, Ritter is credited with writing many books and essays including several volumes on the music history of Europe.

== Selected works ==
=== Original compositions ===
Stage

- Ein kritischer Tag, Familienscene in 1 act (1894)
- Durch Nacht zum Licht!, Schauspiel in 4 acts (1895)
- Ein Stein des Anstoßes, Abenteuer in 1 act (1895)
- Im Alpenglühen, Gebirgsstück mit Gesang und Tanz in 1 act (1903)

Vocal

- Altschottische Volksweisen mit Beibehaltung der Originalmelodien for voice and piano (published 1887); words by Robert Burns
- Fortgeflogen, fortgezogen for soprano or tenor and piano, Op. 20 (published c.1900)
- Schneeglöckchen for voice and piano, Op. 30 (published 1872); words by Fritz Holthey
- Leb' wohl! (Good-bye!) for voice and piano, Op. 59 (published 1893)
- Ich fühle deinen Odem for voice and piano, Op. 60 (published 1894)
- Lieder-Grüße aus Natur und Leben, 10 leichte und ansprechende Gesänge for voice and piano, Op. 62 (published 1894)

Piano

- Deutscher Sieges-Hymnus (German Victory Hymn), Op. 23 (1871)
- Trauergesang auf den Tod eines Kriegers (Lament on the Death of a Warrior), Op. 24

Pedagogical works

- Viola-Schule: für den Schul- und Selbstunterricht (Viola School; Méthode pour l'alto) (published 1884)
- Elementartechnik der Viola alta (Elementary Technique for the Viola alta) (published 1895)
- Solobuch für Viola (Viola alta, Altgeige), Heft I-II: Enthaltend die wichtigsten Soli der orchestralen Litteratur dieses Instrumentes (Orchestral Studies for Viola, Books I and II: Containing the Most Important Solos from the Orchestral Literature) (published 1910s)

Viola or viola alta

- Zwei Stücke (2 Pieces) for viola (viola alta) and piano, Op. 7 (1869)

1. Idylle
2. Elfengesang

- Schlummerlied (Lullaby) for viola (viola alta) and piano, Op. 9 (1871)
- Canzonetta in G major for viola (viola alta) and piano, Op. 10 (1875)
- Erinnerung an die Alpen (Souvenir of the Alps) for viola (viola alta) and piano, Op. 11 (published 1891)
- Jagdstück for viola (viola alta) and piano, Op. 17 (published 1883)
- Auf den Wellen (On the Waves) for viola (viola alta) and piano, Op. 27 (published 1878)
- Melodie for viola (viola alta) and piano (published 1878)
- Spinnerlied (Spinning Song) in B♭ major for viola (viola alta) and piano, Op. 28 (published 1878)
- Zwei Stücke (2 Pieces) for viola (viola alta) and piano, Op. 32 (1886)

1. Pastorale und Gavotte in A minor
2. Im Traume in G major

- Nach slavischen Eindrücken (After Slavic Impressions) for viola (viola alta) and piano, Op. 33 (1886)

1. Elegie in G minor
2. Introduktion und Mazurka in A minor/C major

- Erinnerung an Schottland: Phantasie mit Benutzung altschottischer Weisen (Souvenir of Scotland: Fantasy on an Old Scottish Air) for viola (viola alta) and piano, Op. 34 (1886)
- Concert-Phantasie No.1 in C minor for viola (viola alta) and orchestra or piano, Op. 35 (1886)
- Concert-Phantasie No.2 in C major for viola (viola alta) and orchestra or piano, Op. 36 (1886)
- Italienische Suite (Italian Suite) for viola (viola alta) and orchestra or piano, Op. 37 (1886)

1. Barcarole (Venezia)
2. Elegie (Roma) in A minor
3. Tarantella (Napoli)

- Zwei Stücke (2 Pieces) for viola (viola alta) and piano, Op. 48 (1889)

1. Valse caprice
2. Moto perpetuo

- Zwei Stücke (2 Pieces) for viola (viola alta) and piano, Op. 65 (1898)

1. Andante
2. Allegretto Scherzando

- Gesangsstück in D major for viola (viola alta) and piano, Op. 66 (1900)
- Ständchen (Serenade) in A minor for viola (viola alta) and piano, Op. 70 (published 1905)
- Rokoko: 2 Vortragsstücke (Rococo: 2 Concert Pieces) for viola (viola alta) and piano, Op. 73 (published 1907)

1. Gavotte in C major
2. Pastorale und Menuett in C major

- Dithyrambe in G minor for viola (viola alta) and piano, Op. 74 (published 1907)
- Melodia religiosa for viola (viola alta) and piano

=== Transcriptions ===
Transcriptions for viola or viola alta and piano unless otherwise noted

- Hermann Ritter's Repertorium für die Viola alta (Altgeige) mit Begleitung des Pianoforte (Hermann Ritter's Repertoire for the Viola alta and piano) (published 1878 by W. Schmid, Nürnberg)

1. Aria di chiesa by Alessandro Stradella
2. Largo in E minor by Jean-Marie Leclair
3. Larghetto by Wolfgang Amadeus Mozart
4. Moment musical by Franz Schubert; original for piano
5. Lied ohne Worte by Felix Mendelssohn; original for piano
6. Melodie by Hermann Ritter
7. La Romanesca: Tanz aus dem XVI. Jahrhunderts
8. Recitativ und Arie (aus Rinaldo) by George Frideric Handel
9. Largo in F major by Johann Sebastian Bach
10. Aria by Antonio Lotti
11. Sonate in E-moll by Wolfgang Amadeus Mozart
12. Ave verum by Wolfgang Amadeus Mozart
13. Larghetto from the Violin Concerto by Ludwig van Beethoven
14. Ave Maria by Franz Schubert
15. Russisches Lied (Der Zweifel) by Mikhail Glinka; original for voice, chorus and piano
16. Auf den Wellen by Hermann Ritter
17. Gavotte (G-Dur) by Giovanni Battista Martini
18. Romanze (Tregiorni) by Giovanni Battista Pergolesi
19. Andante (F-Dur) by Wolfgang Amadeus Mozart
20. Andantino (Es-Dur) by Wolfgang Amadeus Mozart
21. Nocturne by John Field
22. Arie (aus der D-Dur-Suite) by Johann Sebastian Bach
23. La séparation: Nocturne (1839) by Mikhail Glinka; original for piano
24. Chant sans paroles (Lied ohne Worte), Op. 2 No. 3 by Pyotr Ilyich Tchaikovsky

- Anthologie für Bratsche (Altgeige) mit Begleitung des Klaviers (Anthology for Viola or Viola alta and Piano), Book I: Works by Ludwig van Beethoven (published 1880s by C. Merseburger, Leipzig)

1. Romanze, Op. 40; original for violin and orchestra
2. Adelaide, Op. 46; original for voice and piano
3. Romanze, Op. 50; original for violin and orchestra

- Anthologie für Bratsche (Altgeige) mit Begleitung des Pianoforte (Anthology for Viola or Viola alta and Piano), Book II (published 1880s by C. Merseburger, Leipzig)

1. Larghetto from Sonate Concertante No. 4 in D major, Op. 115 (1809) by Louis Spohr; original for violin and harp
2. Recitativ und Andante from the Violin Concerto No. 6, Op. 28 (1808–1809) by Louis Spohr; original for violin and orchestra
3. Barcarole from 6 Salonstücke, Op. 135 No. 1 by Louis Spohr; original for violin and piano
4. Erlkönig, Op. 1 by Franz Schubert

- Musik für Viola: Übertragungen von Hermann Ritter (Music for Viola: Transcriptions by Hermann Ritter); Nos. 1~3 (1884); Nos. 4~17 (1885); No. 20 (1891); Nos. 21~25 (1892); published by Friedrich Kistner, Leipzig

1. Air varié, Op. 10 by Pierre Rode
2. Élégie, Op. 10 by Heinrich Wilhelm Ernst; original for violin and piano
3. Suite by Johann Sebastian Bach
  1. Sarabande (BWV 1012)
  2. Gavotte (BWV 811)
  3. Andante (BWV 1003)
  4. Allegro (BWV 1009)
4. Notturno, Op. 9 No. 2 by Frédéric Chopin; original for piano
5. Lied ohne Worte, Op. 53 No.2 by Felix Mendelssohn; original for piano
6. Russische Melodie (Kosakentanz)
7. Moto perpetuo by Niccolò Paganini; original for violin and piano
8. Frühlingslied (Lied ohne Worte), Op. 62 No.6 by Felix Mendelssohn; original for piano
9. Lied ohne Worte, Op. 85 No. 1 by Felix Mendelssohn; original for piano
10. Adagio cantabile aus der Sonate pathétique, Op. 13 by Ludwig van Beethoven; original for piano
11. Romance sans paroles in G major, Op. 23 (1875) by Karl Davydov; original for cello and piano
12. Cavatine by Joachim Raff
13. Wiegenlied, Op. 98 No. 2 by Franz Schubert
14. Impromptu, Op. 90 No. 3 by Franz Schubert; original for piano
15. Serenade aus dem Quartett No. 74 (Andante cantabile) by Joseph Haydn
16. Notturno aus der Musik "Sommernachtstraum" by Felix Mendelssohn; original for orchestra
17. Waltz, Op. 34 No. 2 by Frédéric Chopin; original for piano
18. Adagio aus dem Klarinettenkonzert by Wolfgang Amadeus Mozart; original for clarinet and orchestra
19. Aria in D minor by Francesco Durante
20. Larghetto by Giuseppe Tartini
21. Czárdás
22. Lento, Movement I from a Sonata by Johann Sebastian Bach
23. Siciliano by Johann Sebastian Bach
24. Adagio by Johann Sebastian Bach
25. 4 altschottische Volkslieder (4 Old Scottish Folk Songs)

- Liebesgesang (Love Song), Notturno for viola (viola alta) and piano by Leopold Damrosch (published 1888)
- Albumblatt (Es-dur) for viola (viola alta) and piano by Richard Wagner (published 1890s); original for piano (1875)
- Bel canto: sechs Stücke von Meistern des XVII. und XVIII. Jahrhunderts (Bel Canto: 6 Pieces by Masters of the 17th and 18th Centuries) for viola alta (or violin) and piano or organ (published 1900)

1. Arietta in G major by Alessandro Stradella
2. Siciliana in G minor by Alessandro Scarlatti
3. Vergin tutt'amor in D minor by L. Durante
4. Aria "Caro mio ben" in D major by Giuseppe Giordani
5. Adagio in E major by Johann Sebastian Bach
6. Andante in A minor by George Frideric Handel

- Causerie for viola and piano (1900) by Alphonse Mailly (1833–1918); original for piano

=== Literary works ===
- Die Viola ihre Geschichte, ihre Bedeutung und die Principien ihres Baues (The Viola: Its History, Significance and the Principles of Its Structure) (1876)
- Die Geschichte der Viola alta und die Grundsätze ihres Baues (The History of the Viola alta, and the Principles of Its Structure) (1877)
- Repetitorium der Musikgeschichte nach Epochen übersichtlich dargelegt, nebst einem Verzeichnisse der hauptsächlichsten wissenschaftlichen Musikliteratur (1880)
- Über den Zweck des Studiums der Musikgeschichte (The Purpose of Music History Studies) (1880)
- Hermann Ritter und seine Viola alta (Hermann Ritter and His Viola alta) (1881)
- Aus der Harmonielehre meines Lebens: Kleine Skizzen und Aphorismen von Hermann Ritter (From the Harmony Teachings of My Life: Little Sketches and Aphorismen of Hermann Ritter) (1883)
- Die Viola alta oder Altgeige (The Viola alta or Altgeige) (1885)
- Populäre Elementartheorie der Musik für gebildete Musikfreunde (Popular Elementary Music Theory for Music Lovers) (1885)
- Die Aesthetik der Tonkunst in ihren wichtigsten Grundzügen (The Aesthetics of Music in Its Most Fundamental Features) (1886)
- Der dreifüßige oder Normal-Geigensteg erfunden und begründet von Hermann Ritter: Mit 50 Modell-Abbildungen (The Three-Footed or Normal Violin Bridge Invented and Founded by Hermann Ritter: With 50 Model Images) (1889)
- Musik in den Alpen (Music in the Alps) (1889)
- Katechismus der Musik-Aesthetik: Ein Hülfsbuch für den Musikunterricht in Schule und Haus (Catechism of the Music Aesthetic: a Guidebook for Music Lessons in School and Home) (1890)
- Richard Wagner als Erzieher. Ein Volksbuch und zugleich Begleiter zu den bayreuther Festspielen (Richard Wagner as an Educator. A Companion Book of the Bayreuth Festival) (1891)
- Über musikalische Erziehung: Ein Mahnruf an Eltern, Vormünder, Erzieher (On Music Education: A Warning Cry to Parents, Guardians, Educators) (1891)
- Studien und Skizzen aus Musik- und Kulturgeschichte, sowie Musikästhetik (Studies and Sketches of Musical and Cultural History and also Aesthetics of Music) (1892)
- Etwas weniger Musik! (A Little Less Music) (1896)
- Franz Schubert (Geb. 31. Januar 1797) Gedenkschrift zur 100. Geburtstagsfeier. Dem "Schubert-Bund" in Wien gewidmet (1896)
- Volksgesang in alter und neuer Zeit (Folk Song in Ancient and Modern Times) (1896)
- Haydn, Mozart, Beethoven. Ein Dreigestirn am Himmel deutscher Tonkunst (Haydn, Mozart, Beethoven. A Heavenly Triumvirate of German Musical Art) (1897)
- Die fünfsaitige Altgeige (Viola alta) : und die sich daran knüpfende eventuelle Weiterentwickelung der Streich-Instrumente (The Five-String Altgeige (Viola alta) and Further Development of Stringed Instruments) (1898)
- Einiges zum Verständniss von Berlioz' Haroldsinfonie und Berlioz' künstlerischer Bedeutung (Insight to Berlioz's Harold en Italie Symphony and Berlioz's Artistic Significance) (1899)
- Über die materielle und soziale Lage des Orchestermusikers: Ein Mahnruf an Eltern, Vormünder, Erzieher (On the Material and Social Situation of Orchestra Musicians: A Warning Cry to Parents, Guardians, Educators) (1901)
- Allgemeine illustrierte Encyklopädie der Musikgeschichte, 6 Bände (General Illustrated Encyclopedia of Music History, 6 Volumes) (1901–1902)

1. Musikgeschichte des Altertums (A Music History of Antiquity) (1902)
2. Musikgeschichte des Mittelalters (A Music History of the Middle Ages) (1902)
3. Musikgeschichte Deutschlands im 16. – 18. Jahrhunderts (A Music History of Germany in the 16th through 18th Centuries) (1902)
4. Musikgeschichte Deutschlands im 19. Jahrhunderts (A Music History of Germany in the 19th Century) (1902)
5. Musikgeschichte Frankreichs, Britanniens, Russlands u.s.w. (A Music History of France, Britain, Russia, etc.) (1902)
6. Musikgeschichte Italiens (A Music History of Italy) (1902)

- Das 19. Jahrhundert in seinen musikalischen Hauptvertretern in Deutschland (The 19th Century in Its Main Musical Representatives in Germany) (1902)
- Allgemeines über Streichinstrumente sowie Ideen über ein neues Streichquartett: Soprangeige (Violine), Altgeige (Viola alta), Tenorgeige (Viola tenore), Bassgeige (Viola bassa oder Violoncello): nach den Intentionen und dem Modell von Hermann Ritter (General Information about Strings and Ideas about a New String Quartet: Soprano Violin (Violin), Altgeige (Viola alta), Tenor Violin (Viola tenore), Bass Violin (Viola bassa or cello): According to the Intentions and the Model of Hermann Ritter) (1905)
- Erkenne Dich selbst!: Das goldene Buch der Lebensweisheit, 2 Bände (Know Thyself! The Golden Book of Life's Wisdom, 2 Volumes) (1905)
- Professor Hermann Ritter's Neues Streichquartett <Ritter-Quartett> (The Ritter Quartet: Professor Hermann Ritter's New String Quartet) (1910)
- Mein neues oder Reform-Streichquartett (My New or Reform String Quartet)
- Die Quellen zu Richard Wagner's "Der Ring des Nibelungen" (The Sources for Richard Wagner's "Der Ring des Nibelungen") (1911)
- "Franz Liszt" von James Huneker 1911 – Aufsatz von Hermann Ritter ("Franz Liszt" by James Huneker 1911 – Essay by Hermann Ritter) (1911)

== Dedications ==
- Cyrill Kistler (1848–1907) – Serenade in D minor for violin, or viola (viola alta), or cello and orchestra, Op. 72 (1903)
- Franz Liszt (1811–1886) – Romance oubliée for viola and piano, S. 132 (1880)
- Hans Sitt (1850–1922) – 3 Fantasiestücke (3 Fantasy Pieces) for viola and piano, Op. 58 (1894)
