= Théophile Laforge =

French musician

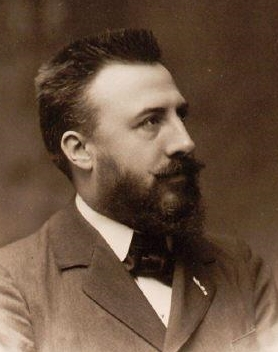
Théophile Laforge

Théophile Édouard Laforge (6 March 1863 in Paris – 31 October 1918 in Paris) was a French violist and first professor of viola at the Conservatoire de Paris.

Laforge studied violin at the Conservatoire de Paris with Eugène Sauzay and was awarded first prize in 1886. From 1883, he was a violinist at the Opéra de Paris and in 1887 became principal violist. Furthermore, from 1887 he was viola soloist with the Orchestre de la Société des Concerts du Conservatoire.

In 1894, he was selected as the first professor of viola of the Conservatoire de Paris. Indeed, 99 years after the implementation of the violin and cello programs, a class entirely reserved for viola players was created. Laforge devoted himself to his post until his death after a short illness in 1918.

During his career at the Conservatoire, Théophile Laforge initiated works for viola from composers of the time, also setting them as a requirement in partial fulfillment of a degree. More than a dozen works would be dedicated to him as well, of which the Concertpiece by George Enescu is the most widely performed.

In his 22 years of teaching, Laforge created a generation of new violists; notable students include Maurice Vieux (who succeeded him at the Conservatoire), Henri Casadesus, Louis Bailly, Paul-Louis Neuberth and Pierre Monteux.

== Dedications ==
- Henri Büsser – Appassionato in C♯ minor for viola and piano, Op. 34 (1910)
- Eugène Cools – Poème in G minor for viola and orchestra, Op. 74 (1909)
- George Enescu – Concertpiece for viola and piano (1906)
- Hélène Fleury-Roy – Fantaisie for viola and piano, Op. 18 (c.1906)
- Léon Honnoré – Morceau de Concert for viola and orchestra or piano, Op. 23 (1890)
- Désiré-Émile Inghelbrecht – Prélude et Saltarelle for viola and piano (1907)
- René Jullien – Concertstück in C minor for viola and orchestra, Op. 19 (1912)
- Henri Marteau – Chaconne in C minor for viola and piano, Op. 8 (1905)
- Pierre Monteux – Arabesque in D major for viola and piano (1920)
- Paul Rougnon – Concertino romantique for viola and piano, Op. 138 (1895)
