= Casimir Ney =

French composer and violist (1801–1877)

Louis-Casimir Escoffier, known primarily as Casimir Ney or L. Casimir-Ney (24 February 1801 – 3 February 1877) was a French composer and one of the foremost violists of the 19th century.

== History ==
Escoffier/Ney was born in Paris. During the mid-19th century, he was active as a performer, primarily in string quartets; he was a member of the Quatour Alard-Chevillard and Société Alard et Franchomme, performing with violinist Jean-Delphin Alard and cellists Auguste Franchomme and Alexandre Chevillard (1811–1877). He was active in Parisian salons and the Société académique des enfants d'Apollon, of which he was president in 1853.

Ney achieved virtually universal critical acclaim as a performer, with special praise for his smooth, broad viola sound. He devoted his efforts almost exclusively to the viola, in contrast to the majority of his contemporaries who went back and forth between the viola and the violin. His biography was a mystery until the musicologist Jeffrey Cooper discovered an 1877 obituary of the successful Parisian violist Louis-Casimir Escoffier, who had died aged 75. He most likely took the name Ney from Napoleon's marshal Michel Ney.

He died in Arras.

== Obituary ==
An obituary from the 11 February 1877 edition of Revue et Gazette Musicale de Paris, "Nouvelles diverses," p. 47, reveals the identity of Casimir Ney.

Original text
Un artiste qui a tenu une place des plus honorables dans le monde musical parisien, Louis-Casimir Escoffier, dit Casimir Ney, est mort à Arras, le 3 février, dans sa soixante-seizième année. Casimir Ney était connu pour son remarquable talent sur l'alto; pendant de longues années, il fit partie de nos meilleures sociétés de quatuors, et donna même chez lui des séances périodiques de musique de chambre, qui furent toujours fort recherchées.

Translation
An artist who has held a most honorable place in the music world of Paris, Louis-Casimir Escoffier, known as Casimir Ney, died at Arras, 3 February, in his seventy-sixth year. Casimir Ney was known for his remarkable talent on the viola; for many years he was a member of some of our best quartets, and even presented periodic chamber music concerts in his home, which were always excellent.

== Compositions ==
Casimir Ney is most famous for his book of 24 preludes for solo viola, which are extremely difficult to play. He also wrote a trio, a quartet and a string quintet, as well as Eighteen Caprices for Violin on the G-string, and a few works for viola and piano. He also wrote many transcriptions.

The 24 Préludes for viola, published in Paris around 1849, are without a doubt the most ambitious attempt in the 19th century to demonstrate the technical possibilities of the viola. The preludes are designed around the 24 keys, are not really preludes in the traditional sense. They are not introductions to anything else. The choice of terminology, "prelude" is used to convey a sense of liberty. Unlike etudes, these pieces are meant to be more than just tools for study. The preludes are not arranged in order of difficulty and do not necessarily each focus on a specific technical point. The technical demands made on the player are in some places unbelievable. For example, the interval of the 12th in the Prélude No. 7 is just short of half the string length and is impossible to play except on a small viola with very big hands. Some of the other difficult techniques asked of the performer are many double stops, double harmonics, left hand pizzicato, 4 finger pizzicato, and the exploration of the full functional range of the instrument.

Original compositions

- Grand Trio for violin, viola and cello (before 1845)
- 1^{er} Quadrille brillant for flute or viola and piano (1842)
- Quadrille "La petite Marie" for flute, viola, flageolet, cornet and piano (1842)
- Quadrille "Le Baroque" for flute, viola, flageolet, cornet and piano (1842)
- Quadrille for piano
- Fantaisie brillante for viola and piano, Op. 12
- 1^{er} Quatour (Quartet No. 1) in E minor for 2 violins, viola and cello, Op. 20 (c.1850)
- 24 Préludes pour l'alto viola dans les 24 tons de la gamme, composés et dédiés aux artistes (24 Preludes in All Keys for Viola, Composed for and Dedicated to Artists), Op. 22 (published c.1849–1853)
- 1^{er} Quintette (Quintet No. 1) for 2 violins, viola, cello and double bass, Op. 24 (1850–1855)
- Fantaisie sur la Sicilienne de A. Gouffé for violin or viola and piano, Op. 25 (1856)
- 18 Caprices pour violon sur la 4^{eme} corde (18 Caprices for Violin on the G-String), Op. 26 (1856)
- Voir Callaunt, Pièce de salon for violin or viola and piano (1856)
- L'amour troupeur, Chansonette Marquerie (1860)
- Polka brillante et facile for 2 violas (1860)

Transcriptions

- Charles-Valentin Alkan: Sonate de concert for viola and piano, Op. 47 (1857, published 1858); original work for cello and piano
- Ludwig van Beethoven: Sonata in F major "Spring" for viola and piano, Op. 24 (published 1840s); original 1801 work for violin and piano
- Francois Schubert: La Solitude, 12ème Mélodie de Francois Schubert for viola and piano; the original version of this work has been lost, and its instrumentation is unknown
- La Romanesca: Air de danse du XVI. siècle (La Romanesca: Air and Dance from the 16th Century) for viola d'amore and piano; original for viola d'amore solo, string quartet and guitar

== Discography ==
- Eric Shumsky: Casimir Ney: 24 Preludes in all keys for viola solo, 2 CDs (Vestige Classics, 2000)

== Sources ==
- "Nouvelles diverses", Revue et Gazette Musicale de Paris, 44/6: 47, 11 February 1877
- Riley, Maurice W. (November 1983), "Jeffrey Cooper Solves Mystery of L. Casimir-Ney's Identity", The American Viola Society, Newsletter No. 25: 21
- Riley, Maurice W. (1991), "The Identity of L. Casimir-Ney, His Compositions, and an Evaluation of His 24 Préludes for Solo Viola", The History of the Viola, Volume II, Ann Arbor, Michigan: Braun-Brumfield, pp. 144–154
- Casimir Ney: 24 Préludes pour l'alto, Éditions Gérard Billaudot.
