= Alessandro Rolla =

Italian composer (1757–1841)

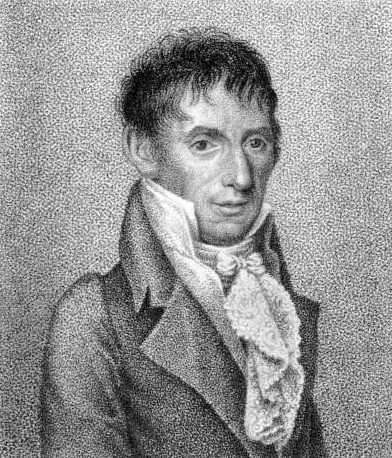
- Engraving by Luigi Rados, c. 1820

Background information
- Born: 23 April 1757; Pavia
- Died: 14 September 1841 (aged 84) Milan
- Occupation: Composer

Alessandro Rolla (Italian pronunciation: [alesˈsandro ˈrɔlla]; 23 April 1757 – 14 September 1841) was an Italian viola and violin virtuoso, composer, conductor and teacher. His son, Antonio Rolla, was also a violin virtuoso and composer.

His fame now rests mainly as "teacher of the great Paganini", yet his role was very important in the development of violin and viola technique. Some of the technical innovations that Paganini later utilized largely, such as left-hand pizzicato, chromatic ascending and descending scales, the use of very high positions on violin and viola, octave passages, were first introduced by Rolla.

== Life ==
Rolla was born in Pavia, Italy, in 1757 and after his initial studies he moved to Milan where, from 1770 to 1778, he studied with Giovanni Andrea Fioroni, Maestro di cappella at Milan Cathedral, who was the most important musician in Milan after G. B. Sammartini. Charles Burney, in his musical tour in Italy, refers to Fioroni to acquire information about the Ambrosian Chant.

In 1772, he made his first public appearance as a soloist and composer performing "the first viola concerto ever heard", as reported by a contemporary writer. (Note: This is in fact false, as the first viola concerto was written several years earlier by Georg Philipp Telemann (Concerto in G major for Viola and String Orchestra).) In 1782 he was appointed principal viola and the leader of the Ducale Orchestra in Parma, playing violin and viola until 1802. (Note: This was the most profitable period of Rolla's life, his most serene and creative years, in a very stimulating cultural and intellectual atmosphere; he was allowed to travel to conduct and perform as a soloist, became known also abroad and his works were published in Paris and Vienna.) In 1795 he received a visit by the father of the young Paganini, wishing him to teach his son. (Note: From Paganini's later letters there is evidence that they remained in contact and even played a quartet together. This relationship must have had an influence on Paganini, as far as his love for the viola is concerned, which in his maturity led him to compose works of great interest for the instrument, such as the concert piece Sonata per la Grand Viola e Orchestra, the Serenata and Terzetto concertante, besides the Quartet No. 15 for Viola Concertante, violin, guitar and cello.) After the death of the Duke of Parma, Rolla was offered a position as leader and orchestra director of the La Scala Orchestra in Milan in 1802. Here the new governors, the French and later the Austrians, wanted to create the most important orchestra of Italy and therefore hired the best virtuosos of the time. Among his students during this period were Cesare Pugni, the prolific composer of ballet music, whom he taught the violin. Rolla would conduct many of Pugni's operas for La Scala, among them Il Disertore Svizzero (1831) and La Vendetta (1832).

Rolla remained at La Scala until 1833. There he was usually identified as the "Primo violino, Capo d'orchestra" being so responsible for leading the orchestra. He conducted the first Milanese performances of Mozart's Don Giovanni, Così fan tutte, La clemenza di Tito and The Marriage of Figaro and Beethoven's first symphonies. During this period he also conducted about eighteen operas of the then most loved opera composer, Gioachino Rossini, as well as operas by Gaetano Donizetti and Bellini, whom he got to know personally. He conducted the premiere of Norma, for example.

From 1811 he was also director of a Cultural Society where musicians would perform chamber music works by Haydn, Mozart and Beethoven, among others. In 1813 at this Cultural Society he gave private performances of Beethoven's 4th, 5th and 6th symphonies. He also frequented the aristocracy drawing rooms, meeting artists and poets, playing for them and dedicating several compositions to them. In 1808 the Conservatoire of Music in Milan was inaugurated and Rolla was appointed professor of violin and viola. In this capacity he composed many didactic works for his own pupils, graded in difficulty, many of which were published by the newly established publishing house Ricordi. (Note: Several of these esercizi are composed with progressive technical difficulties and in all keys. It is also curious to note that Rolla was a member of the adjudicating commission that rejected another famous Parmesan, Giuseppe Verdi, at the entry examination in the Conservatoire of the city, although he was the only one who expressed a favourable judgement about the young student.)

Although involved in opera conducting in a period when in Italy opera was dominating over instrumental music, Rolla continued to compose, maintaining the Italian instrumental tradition high. He wrote about 500 works, from didactic compositions to sonatas, quartets, symphonies, concertos for violin, and at least 13 concertos and other works for viola and orchestra. Significant was his contribution to the dissemination of Beethoven's works in Italy and his familiarity with Beethoven and other Viennese composers is shown in his compositions. He continued to compose and play chamber music until few months before his death at 84.

== Musical legacy ==
As an example of his fame in Italy and abroad, it is worth noting that during his lifetime his compositions were published by publishers such as Le Duc and Imbault in Paris, Artaria in Vienna, Breitkopf & Hartel in Leipzig, Monzani & Hill in London, André in Offenbach, Ricordi in Milan from 1809, and many more. This information about Rolla's life and musical activity helps us interpret his work. He was a musician of European vision, an innovator in his own field who was also able to learn from his contemporaries. Also being so deeply immersed in opera environment had an influence on his style as a composer. He often used themes from operas for his variations.

Many of his works have been published in modern times and are therefore available. His works and performances as a violin and viola player, as well as conductor at La Scala, were often reviewed and appreciated in the Leipziger Zeitung. Rolla deserves a more important position in viola repertoire. His pedagogical works, conceived especially for the viola, are of special interest for students and teachers. They are often conceived in form of duos, lending themselves to be used also for chamber music education purposes as well.

== Compositional style ==
Because of the technical innovations introduced, his work may be considered helpful for the development of viola technique. His style varies from the very melodic phrases, typically operatic in character, rich in fiorituras, to the extremely virtuoso writing, the style usually identified with Paganini. Ingredients of this technique are an ample use of double stops, fast passages in thirds and sixths, octaves from the first to the eighth position, very fast ascending and descending diatonic and chromatic scales, flying staccato, left-hand pizzicato. This intense virtuosity was a new innovation for viola technique, practically unheard of in previous times. Bertini, a historian of his time, in a dictionary of musicians reported that Rolla was prohibited from playing in public because women could not hear him without fainting or suffering attacks of nerves.

== Bibliography ==
- Luigi Inzaghi and Luigi Alberto Bianchi, Alessandro Rolla – Catalogo tematico delle opere, Nuove Edizioni, 1981.
- Maurice Riley, The History of the Viola, Riley, 1980.
- Alessandro Rolla, Adagio e tema con variazioni per viola e orchestra,, edited by L. A. Bianchi, Edizioni Suvini Zerboni, 1979.
- Alessandro Rolla, Sonata in Do maggiore per viola e basso, edited by L. A. Bianchi, Edizioni Suvini Zerboni, 1982.
- Alessandro Rolla, Tre pezzi per viola sola, edited by L. A. Bianchi, Edizioni Suvini Zerboni, 1974.
- Scholes Percy A. (editor), Dr. Burney’s Musical Tours in Europe, vol.I and II; Oxford University Press, 1959.
- Giuseppe Bardone "Convegno su A.Rolla al Collegio Ghislieri" in Academia edu 2016
