= Viola =

Bowed string instrument

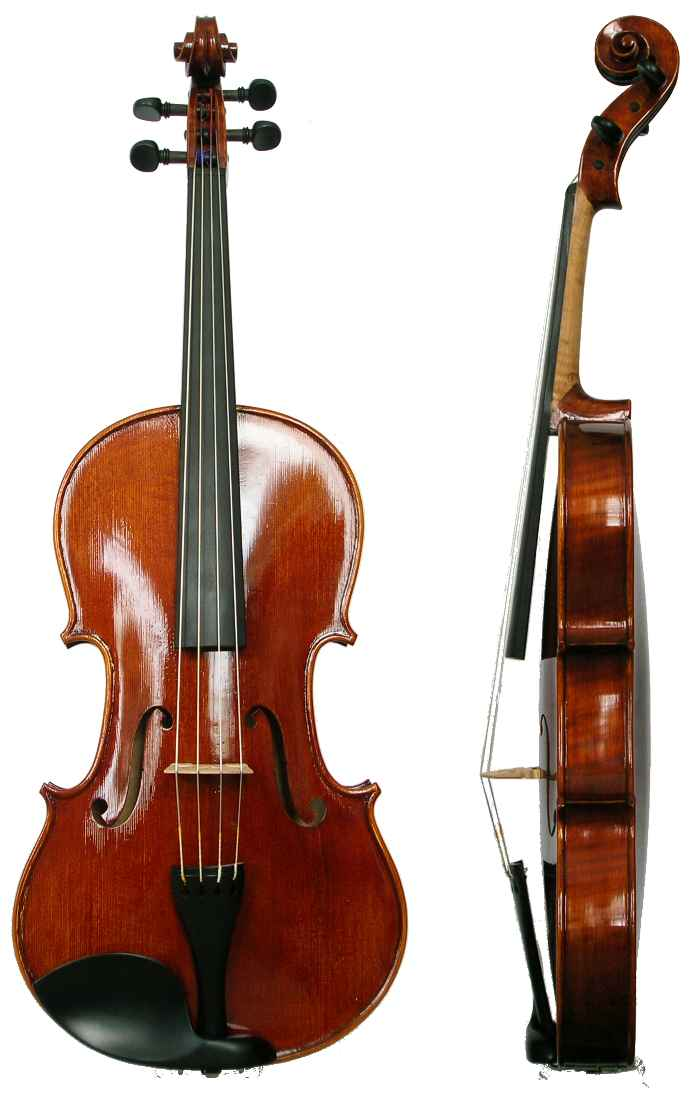

String instrument
- Other names: French: alto; German: Bratsche; Portuguese: Viola d'arco
- Hornbostel–Sachs classification: 321.322–71 (Composite chordophone sounded by a bow)
- Developed: c. 13th century

Playing range
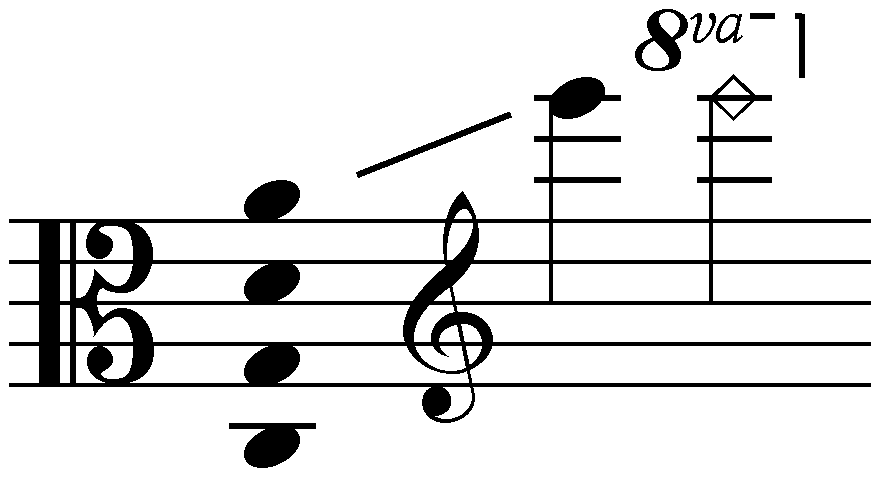

Related instruments
- Violin family (violin, cello, double bass)

Sound sample
- Cello Suite 5, BWV 1011 – 1. Prelude Prelude of Bach's Fifth Cello Suite, performed on a viola by Elias Goldstein

The viola (/viˈoʊlə/ vee-OH-lə, Italian: [ˈvjɔːla, viˈɔːla]) is a string instrument of the violin family, and is usually bowed when played. The viola is slightly larger than the violin and has a lower sound. Since the 18th century, it has been the middle or alto voice of the violin family, between the violin (which is tuned a perfect fifth higher) and the cello (which is tuned an octave lower). The strings from low to high are typically tuned to C_{3}, G_{3}, D_{4}, and A_{4}.

In the past, the viola varied in size and style, as did its names. The word viola originates from the Italian language. The Italians often used the term viola da braccio, meaning, literally, 'of the arm'. "Brazzo" was another Italian word for the viola, which the Germans adopted as Bratsche. The French had their own names: cinquiesme was a small viola, haute contre was a large viola, and taile was a tenor. Today, the French use the term alto, a reference to its range.

The viola was popular in the heyday of five-part harmony, up until the eighteenth century, taking three lines of the harmony and occasionally playing the melody line. Music notation for the viola differs from most other instruments in that it primarily uses the alto clef. When viola music has substantial sections in a higher register, it switches to the treble clef to make it easier to read.

The viola often plays the "inner voices" in string quartets and symphonic writing, and it is more likely than the first violin to play accompaniment parts. The viola occasionally plays a major, soloistic role in orchestral or chamber music. Examples include the symphonic poem Don Quixote, by Richard Strauss, the 13th Quartet by Dmitri Shostakovich, and a symphony with a main viola line: Harold en Italie, by Hector Berlioz. In the earlier part of the 20th century, more composers began to write for the viola, encouraged by the emergence of specialized soloists such as Lionel Tertis and William Primrose. English composers Arthur Bliss, Edwin York Bowen, Benjamin Dale, Frank Bridge, Benjamin Britten, Rebecca Clarke and Ralph Vaughan Williams all wrote substantial chamber and concert works. Many of these pieces were commissioned by, or written for, Tertis. William Walton, Bohuslav Martinů, Tōru Takemitsu, Tibor Serly, Alfred Schnittke, and Béla Bartók have written well-known viola concertos. The concerti by Bartók, Paul Hindemith, Carl Stamitz, Georg Philipp Telemann, and Walton are considered major works of the viola repertoire. Hindemith, who was a violist, wrote a substantial amount of music for viola, including the concerto Der Schwanendreher.

== Form ==
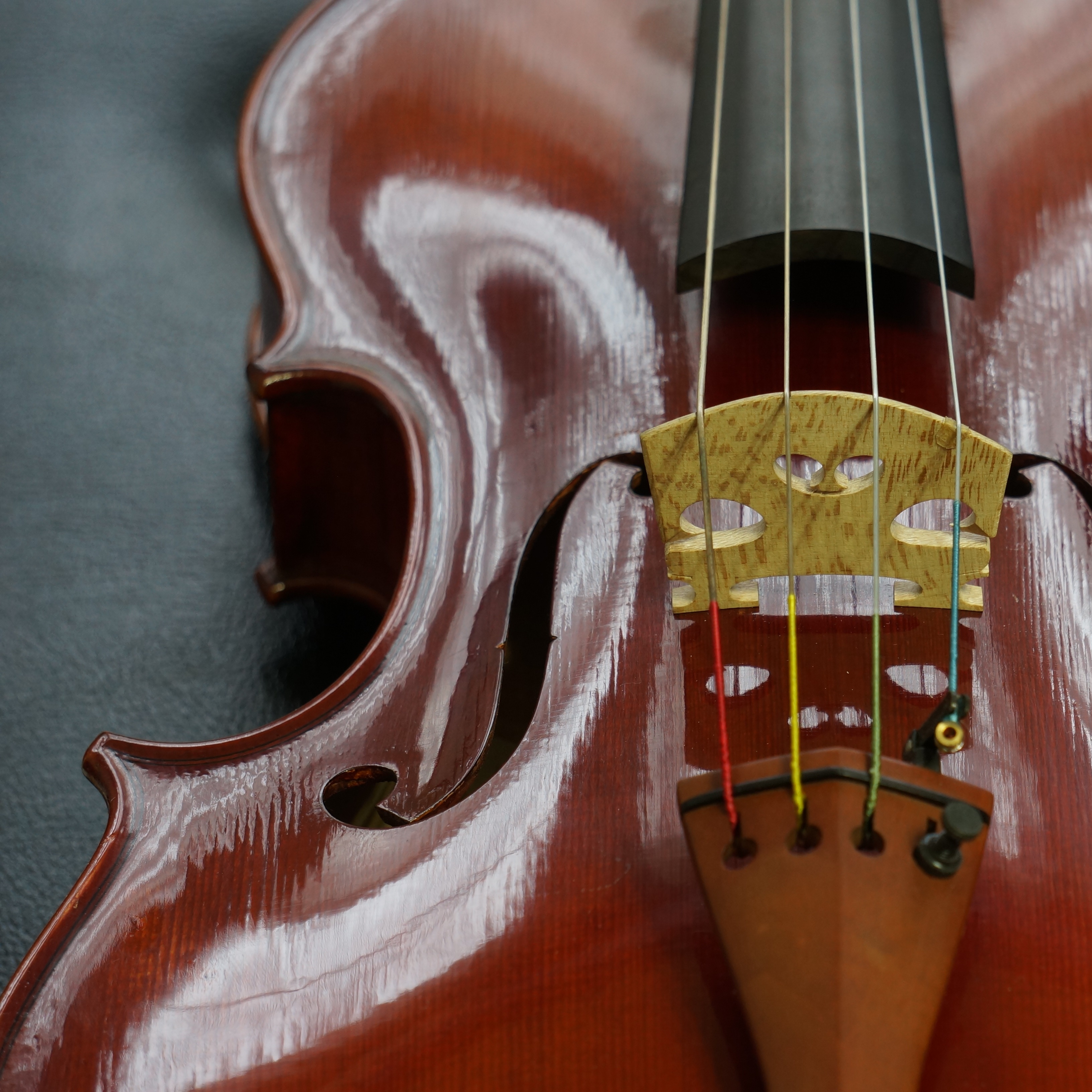
Viola close up of bridge

The viola is similar in material and construction to the violin. A full-size viola's body is between 25 and 100 mm (1 and 4 in) longer than the body of a full-size violin (i.e., between 38 and 46 cm [15–18 in]), with an average length of 41 cm (16 in). Violas for children typically start at 30 cm (12 in). (Note: The body of a viola would need to measure about 51 cm (20 in) long to match the acoustics of a violin, however a viola of that size can only be played vertically like a cello, hence the name vertical viola.) For centuries, viola makers have experimented with the size and shape of violas, often to make a lighter instrument with shorter string lengths, but with a large enough sound box to retain the sound associated with the instrument. Prior to the 18th century, a large viola (known as a tenor) was designed to play lower notes. A smaller-sized viola (alto viola) was used for higher register.

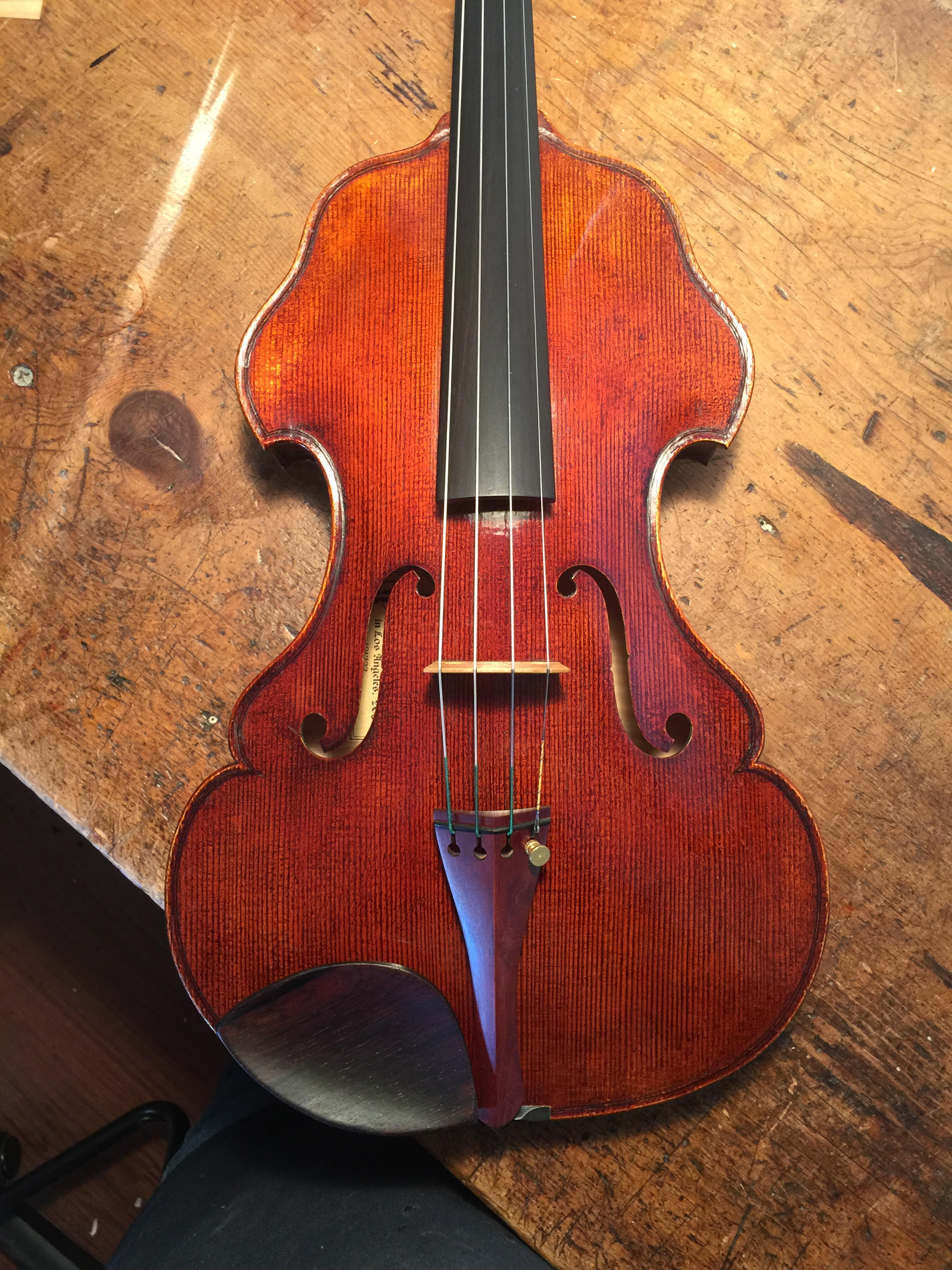
Oak Leaf viola, Eric Benning, Benning Violins

Several experiments have intended to increase the size of the viola to improve its sound and harmony. Hermann Ritter's viola alta, which measured about 48 cm (19 in), was intended for use in Wagner's operas. The Tertis model viola, which has wider bouts and deeper ribs to promote a better tone, is another slightly "nonstandard" shape that allows the player to use a larger instrument. Many experiments with the acoustics of a viola, particularly increasing the size of the body, have resulted in a much deeper tone, making it resemble the tone of a cello. Since many composers wrote for a traditional-sized viola, particularly in orchestral music, changes in the tone of a viola can have unintended consequences upon the balance in ensembles.

One of the most notable makers of violas of the twentieth century was Englishman A. E. Smith, whose violas are sought after and highly valued. Many of his violas remain in Australia, his country of residence, where during some decades the violists of the Sydney Symphony Orchestra had a dozen of them in their section.

More recent (and more radically shaped) innovations have addressed the ergonomic problems associated with playing the viola by making it shorter and lighter, while finding ways to keep the traditional sound. These include the Otto Erdesz "cutaway" viola, which has one shoulder cut out to make shifting easier; the "Oak Leaf" viola, which has two extra bouts; viol-shaped violas such as Joseph Curtin's "Evia" model, which also uses a moveable neck and maple-veneered carbon fibre back, to reduce weight: violas played in the same manner as cellos (see vertical viola); and the eye-catching "Dalí-esque" shapes of both Bernard Sabatier's violas in fractional sizes—which appear to have melted—and David Rivinus' Pellegrina model violas.

Other experiments that deal with the "ergonomics vs. sound" problem have appeared. The American composer Harry Partch fitted a viola with a cello neck to allow the use of his 43-tone scale, called the "adapted viola". Luthiers have also created five-stringed violas, which allow a greater playing range.

== Method of playing ==
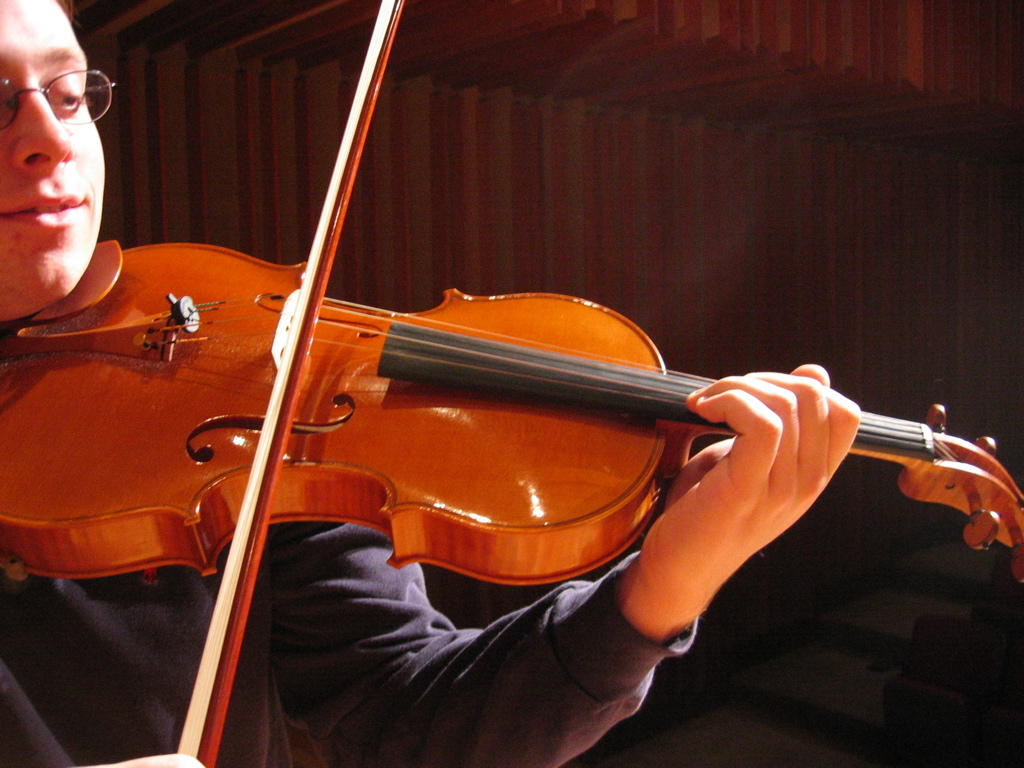
Playing a 43 cm (17 in) viola in 3rd position.

A person who plays the viola is called a violist or a viola player. The technique required for playing a viola has certain differences compared with that of a violin, partly because of its larger size: the notes are spread out further along the fingerboard, although they do not usually require different fingerings. The viola's less responsive strings and the heavier bow warrant a somewhat different bowing technique, and a violist has to lean more intensely on the strings.

The viola is held in the same manner as the violin; however, due to its larger size, some adjustments must be made to accommodate. The viola, just like the violin, is placed on top of the left shoulder between the shoulder and the left side of the face (chin). Because of the viola's size, violists with short arms tend to use smaller-sized instruments for easier playing. The most immediately noticeable adjustments that a player accustomed to playing the violin has to make are to use wider-spaced fingerings. It is common for some players to use a wider and more intense vibrato in the left hand, facilitated by employing the fleshier pad of the finger rather than the tip, and to hold the bow and right arm further away from the player's body. A violist must bring the left elbow further forward or around, so as to reach the lowest string, which allows the fingers to press firmly and create a clearer tone. Different positions are often used, including half position, and most commonly third position.

The viola is strung with thicker gauge strings than the violin. This, combined with its larger size and lower pitch range, results in a deeper and mellower tone. However, the thicker strings also mean that the viola responds to changes in bowing more slowly. Practically speaking, if a violist and violinist are playing together, the violist must begin moving the bow a fraction of a second sooner than the violinist. The thicker strings also mean that more weight must be applied with the bow to make them vibrate.

The viola's bow has a wider band of horsehair than a violin's bow, which is particularly noticeable near the frog (or heel in the UK). Viola bows, at 70–74 g (2.5–2.6 oz), are heavier than violin bows (58–61 g [2.0–2.2 oz]). The profile of the rectangular outside corner of a viola bow frog generally is more rounded than on violin bows.

== Tuning ==
"Normal" stringing shown here; some players reverse the G and C.

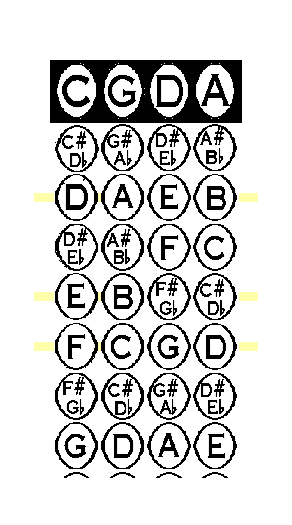
First position viola fingerings

The viola's four strings are normally tuned in fifths: the lowest string is C (an octave below middle C), with G, D, and A above it. This tuning is exactly one fifth below the violin, so that they have three strings in common—G, D, and A—and is one octave above the cello.

Each string of a viola is wrapped around a peg near the scroll and is tuned by turning the peg. Tightening the string raises the pitch; loosening the string lowers the pitch. The A string is normally tuned first, to the pitch of the ensemble: generally 440–442 Hz. The other strings are then tuned to it in intervals of fifths, usually by bowing two strings simultaneously. Most violas also have adjusters—fine tuners that make finer pitch adjustments. Some violists will choose to only have one fine tuner on the A string; others choose to have fine tuners on all strings. These adjust the tension of the string via rotating a small knob above the tailpiece. Such tuning is generally easier to learn than using the pegs, and adjusters are usually recommended for younger players and put on smaller violas, though pegs and adjusters are usually used together. Some violists reverse the tuning of the C and G strings, so that the thicker C string does not turn so severe an angle over the nut, although this is rare.

Small, temporary tuning adjustments can also be made by stretching a string with the hand. A string may be tuned down by pulling it above the fingerboard, or tuned up by pressing the part of the string in the pegbox. These techniques may be useful in performances such as live concerts, reducing the dissonance of an out-of-tune string or viola until a proper opportunity to tune.

The tuning C3-G3-D4-A4 (from lowest to highest) is used for the great majority of all viola music. The strings are tuned perfect fifths apart. However, other tunings are occasionally employed, both in classical music, where the technique is known as scordatura, and in some folk styles. Mozart, in his Sinfonia Concertante for Violin, Viola and Orchestra in E♭, wrote the viola part in D major, and specified that the violist raises the strings in pitch by a semitone. He probably intended to give the viola a brighter tone so the rest of the orchestra would not overpower it. Tertis, in his transcription of the Elgar cello concerto, wrote the slow movement with the C string tuned down to B♭, enabling the viola to play one passage an octave lower.

== Organizations and research ==
A renewal of interest in the viola by performers and composers in the twentieth century led to increased research devoted to the instrument. Paul Hindemith and Vadim Borisovsky made an early attempt at an organization, in 1927, with the Violists' World Union. But it was not until 1968, with the creation of the Viola-Forschungsgesellschaft, now the International Viola Society (IVS), that a lasting organization took hold. The IVS now consists of twelve chapters around the world, the largest being the American Viola Society (AVS), which publishes the Journal of the American Viola Society. In addition to the journal, the AVS sponsors the David Dalton Research Competition and the Primrose International Viola Competition.

The 1960s also saw the beginning of several research publications devoted to the viola, beginning with Franz Zeyringer's Literatur für Viola, which has appeared in several versions, the most recent being in 1985. In 1980, Maurice Riley produced the first attempt at a comprehensive history of the viola, in his History of the Viola, which was followed with a second volume in 1991. The IVS published the multi-language Viola Yearbook from 1979 to 1994, during which several other national chapters of the IVS published respective newsletters. The Primrose International Viola Archive at Brigham Young University houses the greatest amount of material related to the viola, including scores, recordings, instruments, and archival materials from some of the world's greatest violists.

== Music ==
Viola Concerto – 2. Allegro
Composed by Georg Philipp Telemann, performed by the Advent Chamber Orchestra with Elias Goldstein (viola)

Arpeggione Sonata – 3. Allegretto
From Schubert's Arpeggione Sonata, performed by Elias Goldstein (viola) with the Advent Chamber Orchestra

Humoresque in G, Op. 101, No. 7
From Dvořák's Humoresques, arranged for viola and piano by Elias Goldstein, performed by Elias Goldstein (viola) and Monica Pavel (piano)

Improvisation for four violas
Short four-part improvisation demonstrating the range and part of the tone quality of the viola

=== Reading music ===
Music that is written for the viola primarily uses the alto clef, which is otherwise rarely used. The note that resides on the lowest line on the alto clef stave is F_{3}, whereas in treble clef it is E_{4}. Viola music employs the treble clef when there are substantial sections of music written in a higher register. The alto clef indicates the placement of C_{4} on the middle line of the staff.

As the viola is tuned exactly one octave above the cello, music that is notated for the cello can be easily transcribed for alto clef without any changes in key. For example, there are numerous editions of Bach's Cello Suites transcribed for viola. The viola also has the advantage of smaller scale-length when compared to the cello. This means that the stretches needed by cellists to play certain notes are easier to achieve on the viola. However, occasional changes must be made due to differences in the ways that the two instruments are played, as well as their differences in range.

=== Role in pre-twentieth century works ===
In early orchestral music, the viola part was usually limited to filling in harmonies, with very little melodic material assigned to it. When the viola was given a melodic part, it was often duplicated (or was in unison with) the melody played by other strings.

The Brandenburg Concertos, a set of concerti grossi composed by J. S. Bach, are unusual for their time in their use of viola. The third concerto grosso, scored for three violins, three violas, three cellos, and basso continuo, requires virtuosity from the violists. Indeed, Viola I has a solo in the last movement which is commonly required in orchestral auditions. In the sixth concerto grosso, Brandenburg Concerto No. 6, scored for 2 violas "concertino", cello, 2 violas da gamba, and continuo, the two violas play the primary melodic roles. Bach also used this unusual ensemble in his cantatas Gleichwie der Regen und Schnee vom Himmel fällt, BWV 18 and Mein Herze schwimmt im Blut, BWV 199, in which the chorale is accompanied by an obbligato viola.

There are a few Baroque and Classical concerti, such as those by Georg Philipp Telemann (one for solo viola, being one of the earliest viola concertos known, and one for two violas), Alessandro Rolla, Franz Anton Hoffmeister and Carl Stamitz.

The viola plays an important role in chamber music. Mozart used the viola in more creative ways when he wrote his six string quintets. The viola quintets use two violas, which frees them (especially the first viola) for solo passages and increases the variety of writing that is possible for the ensemble. Mozart also wrote for the viola in his Sinfonia Concertante, a set of two duets for violin and viola, and the Kegelstatt Trio for viola, clarinet, and piano. The young Felix Mendelssohn wrote a little-known Viola Sonata in C minor (without opus number, but dating from 1824). Robert Schumann wrote his Märchenbilder for viola and piano. He also wrote a set of four pieces for clarinet, viola, and piano, Märchenerzählungen.

Max Bruch wrote a romance for viola and orchestra, his Op. 85, which explores the emotive capabilities of the viola's timbre. In addition, his Eight pieces for clarinet, viola, and piano, Op. 83, features the viola in a very prominent, solo aspect throughout. His Concerto for Clarinet, Viola, and Orchestra, Op. 88 has been quite prominent in the repertoire and has been recorded by prominent violists throughout the 20th century.

From his earliest works, Brahms wrote music that prominently featured the viola. Among his first published pieces of chamber music, the sextets for strings Op. 18 and Op. 36 contain what amounts to solo parts for both violas. Late in life, he wrote two greatly admired sonatas for clarinet and piano, his Op. 120 (1894): he later transcribed these works for the viola (the solo part in his Horn Trio is also available in a transcription for viola). Brahms also wrote "Two Songs for Voice, Viola and Piano", Op. 91, "Gestillte Sehnsucht" ("Satisfied Longing") and "Geistliches Wiegenlied" ("Spiritual Lullaby") as presents for the famous violinist Joseph Joachim and his wife, Amalie. Dvořák played the viola and apparently said that it was his favorite instrument: his chamber music is rich in important parts for the viola. Two Czech composers, Bedřich Smetana and Leoš Janáček, included significant viola parts, originally written for viola d'amore, in their quartets "From My Life" and "Intimate Letters" respectively: the quartets begin with an impassioned statement by the viola. This is similar to Bach, Mozart, and Beethoven all occasionally played the viola part in chamber music.

The viola occasionally has a major role in orchestral music, a prominent example being Richard Strauss' tone poem Don Quixote for solo cello and viola and orchestra. Other examples are the "Ysobel" variation of Edward Elgar's Enigma Variations and the solo in his work, In the South (Alassio), the pas de deux scene from act 2 of Adolphe Adam's Giselle and the "La Paix" movement of Léo Delibes's ballet Coppélia, which features a lengthy viola solo.

Gabriel Fauré's Requiem was originally scored (in 1888) with divided viola sections, lacking the usual violin sections, having only a solo violin for the Sanctus. It was later scored for orchestra with violin sections, and published in 1901. Recordings of the older scoring with violas are available.

While the viola repertoire is quite large, the amount written by well-known pre-20th-century composers is relatively small. There are many transcriptions of works for other instruments for the viola and the large number of 20th-century compositions is very diverse. See "The Viola Project" at the San Francisco Conservatory of Music, where Professor of Viola Jodi Levitz has paired a composer with each of her students, resulting in a recital of brand-new works played for the very first time.

=== Twentieth century and beyond ===
In the earlier part of the 20th century, more composers began to write for the viola, encouraged by the emergence of specialized soloists such as Tertis. Englishmen Arthur Bliss, Edwin York Bowen, Benjamin Dale, and Ralph Vaughan Williams all wrote chamber and concert works for Tertis. William Walton, Bohuslav Martinů, and Béla Bartók wrote well-known viola concertos. Hindemith wrote a substantial amount of music for the viola; being himself a violist, he often performed his own works. Claude Debussy's Sonata for flute, viola and harp has inspired a significant number of other composers to write for this combination.

Charles Wuorinen composed his virtuosic Viola Variations in 2008 for Lois Martin. Elliott Carter also wrote several works for viola including his Elegy (1943) for viola and piano; it was subsequently transcribed for clarinet. Ernest Bloch, a Swiss-born American composer best known for his compositions inspired by Jewish music, wrote two famous works for viola, the Suite 1919 and the Suite Hébraïque for solo viola and orchestra. Rebecca Clarke was a 20th-century composer and violist who also wrote extensively for the viola. Lionel Tertis records that Elgar (whose cello concerto Tertis transcribed for viola, with the slow movement in scordatura), Alexander Glazunov (who wrote an Elegy, Op. 44, for viola and piano), and Maurice Ravel all promised concertos for viola, yet all three died before doing any substantial work on them.

In the latter part of the 20th century a substantial repertoire was produced for the viola; many composers including Miklós Rózsa, Revol Bunin, Alfred Schnittke, Sofia Gubaidulina, Giya Kancheli and Krzysztof Penderecki, have written viola concertos. The American composer Morton Feldman wrote a series of works entitled The Viola in My Life, which feature concertante viola parts. In spectral music, the viola has been sought after because of its lower overtone partials that are more easily heard than on the violin. Spectral composers like Gérard Grisey, Tristan Murail, and Horațiu Rădulescu have written solo works for viola. Neo-Romantic, post-Modern composers have also written significant works for viola including Robin Holloway Viola Concerto Op. 56 and Sonata Op. 87, Peter Seabourne a large five-movement work with piano, Pietà, Airat Ichmouratov Viola Concerto No. 1, Op. 7 and Three Romances for Viola, Strings, and Harp, Op. 22.

=== Contemporary pop music ===
The viola is sometimes used in contemporary popular music, mostly in the avant-garde. John Cale of The Velvet Underground used the viola, as do some modern groups such as alternative rock band 10,000 Maniacs, Imagine Dragons, folk duo John & Mary, British Sea Power, The Airborne Toxic Event, Marillion, and others often with instruments in a chamber setting. Jazz music has also seen its share of violists, from those used in string sections in the early 1900s to a handful of quartets and soloists emerging from the 1960s onward. It is quite unusual though, to use individual bowed string instruments in contemporary popular music.

== Notable violists ==
There are few well-known viola virtuoso soloists, perhaps because little virtuoso viola music was written before the twentieth century. Pre-twentieth century viola players of note include Stamitz, Rolla, Antonio Rolla, Chrétien Urhan, Casimir Ney, Louis van Waefelghem, and Ritter. Important viola pioneers from the twentieth century were Tertis, William Primrose, Hindemith, Théophile Laforge, Cecil Aronowitz, Maurice Vieux, Borisovsky, Lillian Fuchs, Dino Asciolla, Frederick Riddle, Walter Trampler, Ernst Wallfisch, Csaba Erdélyi, the only violist to ever win the Carl Flesch International Violin Competition, and Emanuel Vardi, the first violist to record the 24 Caprices by Paganini on viola. Many noted violinists have publicly performed and recorded on the viola as well, among them Eugène Ysaÿe, Yehudi Menuhin, David Oistrakh, Pinchas Zukerman, Maxim Vengerov, Julian Rachlin, James Ehnes, and Nigel Kennedy.

Among the great composers, several preferred the viola to the violin when they were playing in ensembles, the most noted being Ludwig van Beethoven, Bach and Mozart. Other composers also chose to play the viola in ensembles, including Joseph Haydn, Franz Schubert, Mendelssohn, Dvořák, and Benjamin Britten. Among those noted both as violists and as composers are Rebecca Clarke and Hindemith. Contemporary composers and violists Kenji Bunch, Scott Slapin, and Lev Zhurbin have written a number of works for viola.

== Electric violas ==
To amplify the sound produced, regular acoustic violas are fitted with a piezoelectric pickup. Specially-designed electric violas have little or no body; unlike traditional violas, they can be made of materials other than wood, and of any colour.

Electric violas are mostly violin-sized, as they use the amp and speaker to create a big sound, so they do not need a large soundbox. Indeed, some electric violas have little or no soundbox, and thus rely entirely on amplification. Fewer electric violas are available than electric violins. It can be hard for violists who prefer a physical size or familiar touch references of a viola-sized instrument, when they must use an electric viola that uses a smaller violin-sized body. John Cale, formerly of The Velvet Underground, is one of the more notable users of such an electric viola and he has used them both for melodies in his solo work and for drones in his work with The Velvet Underground (e.g. "Venus in Furs"). Other notable players of the electric viola are Geoffrey Richardson of Caravan and Ramsey.

Instruments may be built with an internal preamplifier, or may put out an unbuffered transducer signal. While such signals may be fed directly to an amplifier or mixing board, they often benefit from an external preamp/equalizer on the end of a short cable, before being fed to the sound system. In rock and other loud styles, the electric viola player may use effects units such as reverb or overdrive.
