= String Quartet in D minor (Sibelius) =

String quartet by Jean Sibelius (1909)

- Voces intimae
- by Jean Sibelius
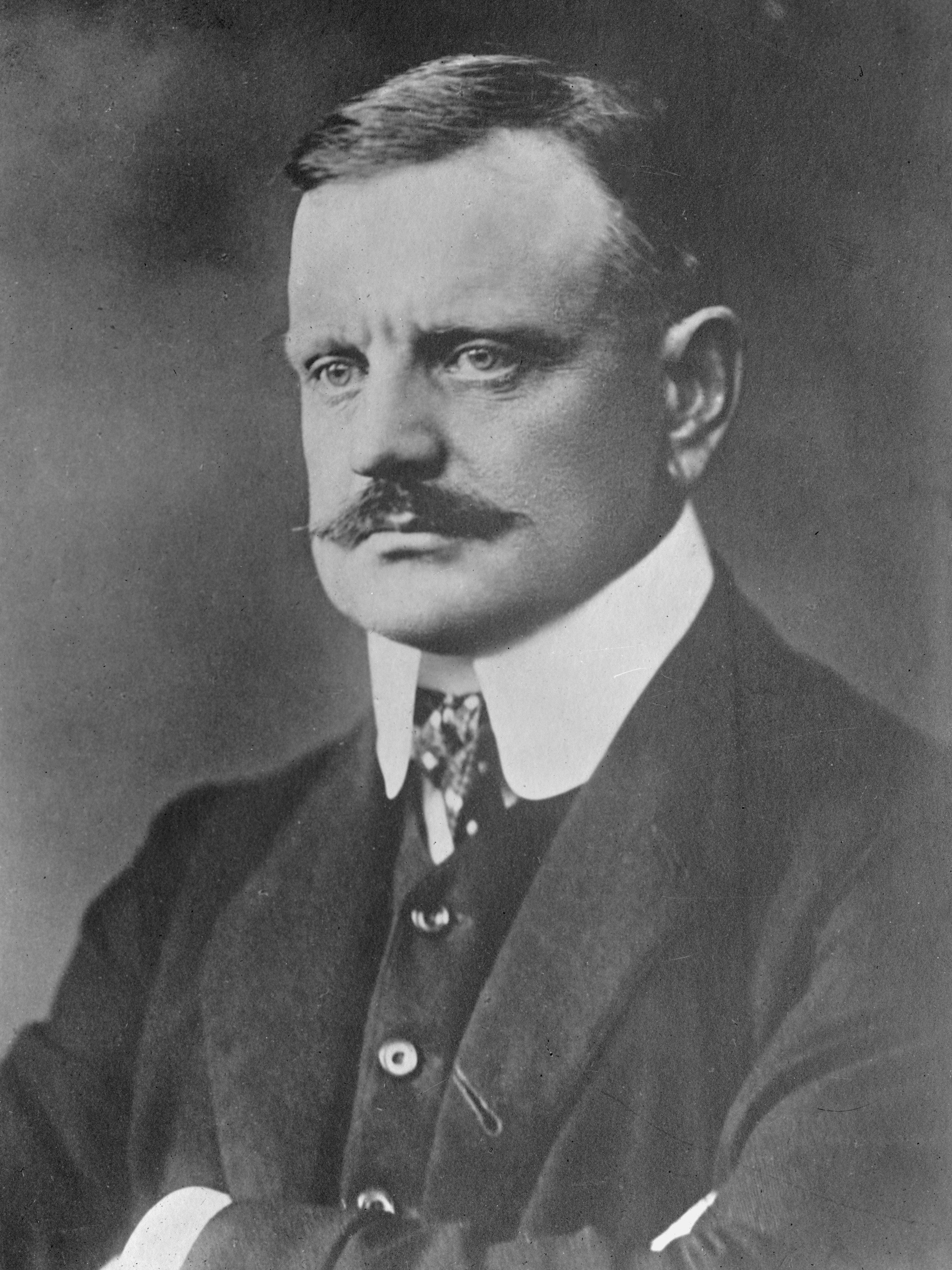
- The composer in 1913
- Opus: 56
- Composed: 1908–1909
- Publisher: Lienau (1909)
- Duration: 28 mins.
- Movements: 5

Premiere
- Date: 25 April 1910
- Location: Helsinki, Finland
- Performers: Viktor Nováček (violin I); Sulo Hurstinen (violin II); Carl Lindelöf (viola); Bror Persfelt (cello)

The String Quartet in D minor, Voces intimae (literal English translation: "Intimate voices" or "Inner voices"), Op. 56, is a five-movement chamber piece for two violins, viola, and cello written in 1909 by the Finnish composer Jean Sibelius. It is the only major work for string quartet of his mature period.

== History ==
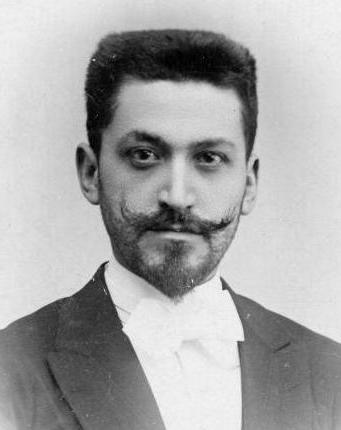
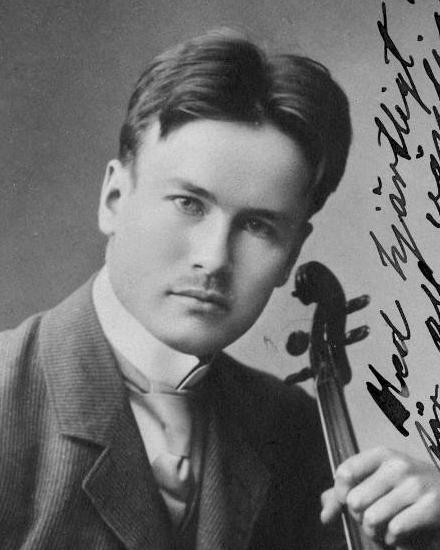
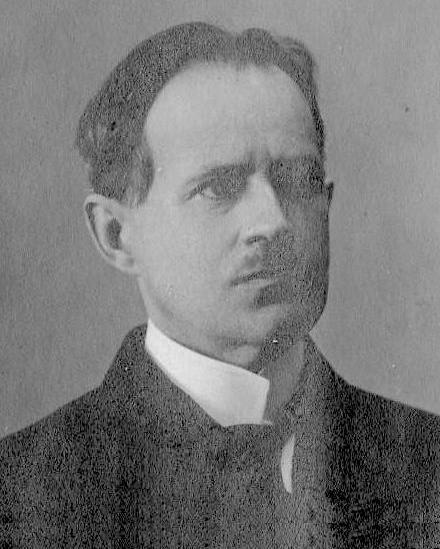
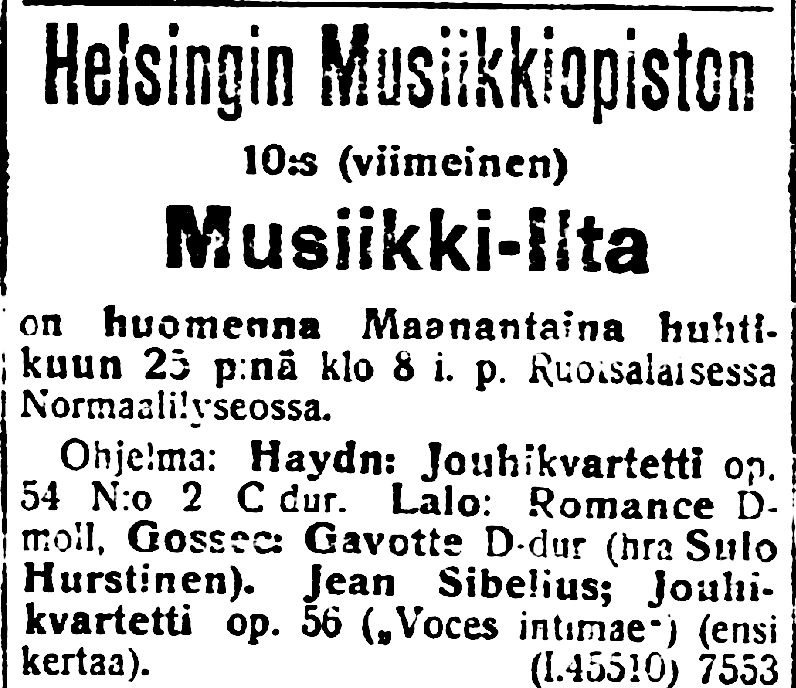
Voces intimae premiered on 25 April 1910 at the Helsinki Music Institute, with Viktor Nováček (top) and Sulo Hurstinen (middle) on violin, Carl Lindelöf (bottom) on viola, and Bror Persfelt (not pictured) on cello.

As a student, Sibelius composed several works for string quartet. In 1885 he finished the String Quartet in E♭ major, followed in 1889, after quite a few individual movements for this combination, by the String Quartet in A minor. The first string quartet to receive an opus number was in 1890: the String Quartet in B♭ major (Op. 4). Afterwards he wrote no string quartets until Voces intimae in 1909. Composed between his Third and Fourth Symphony, it remained "the only major work for string quartet of Sibelius's mature period".

Sibelius composed the quartet from December 1908, working on it in London in early 1909. The Latin title, translating to "Intimate Voices" or "Inner voices", marks a "conversational quality" and "inwardness" of the music. The composer wrote about his work in a letter to his wife: "It turned out as something wonderful. The kind of thing that brings a smile to your lips at the hour of death. I will say no more." Sibelius showed it to his publisher Robert Lienau on 15 April 1909.

The first performance was on 25 April 1910 at the Helsinki Music Institute. A review in the Helsingin Sanomat noted: "The composition attracted a great deal of attention, and it is undoubtedly one of the most brilliant products in its field. It is not a composition for the public at large, it is so eccentric and out of the ordinary." Sibelius later wrote about the composition: "The melodic material is good but the harmonic material could be 'lighter', and even 'more like a quartet.'"

== Music ==
Sibelius structured the quartet in five movements:

1. Andante – Allegro molto moderato
2. Vivace
3. Adagio di molto
4. Allegretto (ma pesante)
5. Allegro

The work opens with a dialogue of violin and cello. The first movement contrasts "murmurous figuration with firm chords". The second movement is a scherzo in A major, connected to the first by musical motifs. The central slow movement has been described as a "soulful quest for serenity in F major". It contains "three detached, soft chords in E minor, remote from any of the previous harmonic implications", to which Sibelius added the "voces intimae" in a friend's score. A second scherzo is also connected by motivic similarity to the first movement. The finale, "with more than a hint of folk fiddling", grows in intensity by markings from Allegro to "sempre più energico" (always more energetic), described as "fiercely accented music of forceful contrasts but irresistible momentum".

== Arrangements ==
The Finnish violinist and composer Pekka Kuusisto has arranged the work for chamber orchestra, which was included in Kuusisto's 2009 Australian tour with the Australian Chamber Orchestra.

== Discography ==
The Budapest String Quartet made the world premiere studio recording of the String Quartet in D minor on 8 August 1933, which appeared on Volume 3 of HVM's The Sibelius Society series (DB.2317/23, 1935).

No.	Quartet	Violin I	Violin II	Viola	Cello	Runtime (Note: All runtimes are official, as printed on CD or LP liner notes.)	Rec. (Note: Refers to the year in which the performers recorded the work; this may not be the same as the year in which the recording was first released to the general public.)	Recording venue	Label	Ref.
1	Budapest (1)	Josef Roisman (1)	Alexander Schneider (1)	István Ipolyi	Mischa Schneider (1)	26:56	1933	Beethovensaal, Alte Philharmonie Berlin	Warner Classics	(Note: Budapest–Warner Classics (0825646053179) 2015)
2	Griller	Sidney Griller	Jack O’Brien	Philip Burton	Colin Hampton	36:03	1950	Decca Studios	Decca	(Note: Griller–Decca (478 8589) 2015)
3	Budapest (2)	Josef Roisman (2)	Alexander Schneider (2)	Boris Kroyt	Mischa Schneider (2)	28:22	1955	Coolidge Auditorium	Urania	(Note: Budapest–Urania (WS 121.376) 2019)
4	Smetana	Jiří Novák	Lubomír Kostecký	Milan Škampa	Antonín Kohout	29:31	1956	[Unknown venue], Helsinki	Ina	(Note: Smetana–Ina (IMV072) 2007)
5	Pascal	Jacques Dumont	Maurice Crut	Léon Pascal	Robert Salles	32:23	c. 1957	?	First Hand	(Note: Pascal–First Hand (FHR85) 2024)
6	Borodin	Rostislav Dubinsky	Yaroslav Alexandrov	Dmitri Shebalin	Valentin Berlinsky	?	c. 1959	?	Melodiya	(Note: Borodin–Melodiya (33Д-5668) 19??)
7	Claremont	Marc Gottlieb	Vladimir Weisman	Scott Nickrenz	Irving Klein	27:37	c. 1966	?	Nonesuch	(Note: Claremont–Nonesuch (H–71140) 1966)
8	Lansdowne	Jack Rothstein	Antony Gilbert	Kenneth Essex	Charles Tunnell	?	c. 1967	?	His Master's Voice	(Note: Lansdowne–HMV (HQS 1061) 1967)
9	Finlandia	Olavi Pälli	Jussi Pesonen	Esa Kamu	Heikki Rautasalo	?	1970	Finnvox Studios	His Master's Voice	(Note: Finlandia–HMV (5 E063-34235) 1970)
10	Voces Intimae	Ari Angervo	Jorma Rahkonen	Mauri Pietikäinen	Veikko Höylä	31:04	1974	Vik Castle	BIS	(Note: Voces Intimae–BIS (CD-10) 1988)
11	Copenhagen	Tutter Givskov	Mogens Lydolph	Mogens Bruun	Asger Lund-Christiansen	32:28	c. 1975	?	Turnabout	(Note: Copenhagen–Turnabout (TV 34091S) 1975)
12	Fitzwilliam	Christopher Rowland	Janathan Sparey	Alan George	Ioan Davies	32:57	1978	Snape Maltings Concert Hall	Decca	(Note: Fitzwilliam–Decca (485 3639) 2023)
13	Sibelius Academy	Seppo Tukiainen	Erkki Kantola	Veikko Kosonen	Arto Noras	28:14	1980	Sibelius Academy Concert Hall	Finlandia	(Note: Sibelius Academy–Finlandia (4509–95851–2) 1992)
14	Guarneri	Arnold Steinhardt	John Dalley	Michael Tree	David Soyer	28:47	1989	[Unknown venue], New York	Philips	(Note: Guarneri–Philips (426 286–2) 1991)
15	Gabrieli	John Georgiadis	Brendan O'Reilly	Ian Jewel	Keith Harvey	34:13	1989	Snape Maltings Concert Hall	Chandos	(Note: Gabrieli–Chandos (CHAN 8742) 1989)
16	Fresk	Lars Fresk	Hans-Erik Westberg	Lars-Gunnar Bodin	Per-Göran Skytt	30:10	1989	Studio 2, Swedish Radio	Bluebell	(Note: Fresk–Bluebell (ABCD 040) 1991)
17	Sophisticated Ladies	Ulrika Jansson	Annette Mannheimer	Mona Bengtsson	Åsa Forsberg	29:41	1989	Petrus Church, Stocksund	BIS	(Note: Sophisticated Ladies–BIS (CD-463) 1989)
18	Juilliard	Robert Mann	Joel Smirnoff	Samuel Rhodes	Joel Krosnick	30:45	1990	Coolidge Auditorium	Sony Classical	(Note: Juilliard–Sony Classical (SK 48193) 1992)
19	Jean Sibelius	Yoshiko Arai	Jukka Pohjola	Teemu Kupiainen	Seppo Kimanen	30:11	1991	Roihuvuori Church	Ondine	(Note: Jean Sibelius–Ondine (ODE 773-2) 1991)
20	Wilanow	Tadeusz Gadzina	Paweł Łosakiewicz	Ryszard Duź	Marian Wasiółka		1991	Studio 2, Polish Radio	Accord	(Note: Wilanow–Accord (202492) 1993)
21	New Helsinki	Jan Söderblom	Petri Aarnio	Ilari Angervo	Mark Ylönen	33:22	1997	Sigyn Hall, Turku	Finlandia	(Note: New Helsinki–Finlandia (0927-40872-2) 2002)
22	Melos	Wilhelm Melcher	Ida Bieler	Hermann Voss	Peter Buck	30:38	1998	Jesus-Christus-Kirche, Berlin	Harmonia Mundi	(Note: Melos–Harmonia Mundi (HMA 901671) 2000)
23	Beau	Anita Dusevic	Stephan Bryant	Sue Jane Bryant	Peter Parthun	?	c. 1998	?	Arktos Recordings	(Note: Beau–Arktos Recordings (ARK98028) 1998)
24	Utrecht	Eeva Koskinen	Katherine Routley	Sven Arne Tepl	Sebastian Koloski	29:28	2001	[Unknown venue], Renswoude	Cobra	(Note: Utrecht–Cobra (COBRA 0003) 2001)
25	Oslo	Geir Inge Lotsberg	Per Kristian Skalstad	Are Sandbakken	Øystein Sonstad	32:25	2002	Lommedalen Church	cpo	(Note: Oslo–cpo (999 977-2) 2003)
26	Tempera	Laura Vikman	Silva Koskela	Tiila Kangas	Ulla Lampela	29:48	2004	Länna Church, Uppland	BIS	(Note: Tempera–BIS (CD-1466) 2007)
27	Emerson	Eugene Drucker	Philip Seltzer	Lawrence Dutton	David Finckel	27:56	2004	American Academy of Arts and Letters	Deutsche Grammophon	(Note: Emerson–DG (B0006340-02) 2006)
28	Daedalus	Min-Young Kim	Kyu-Young Kim	Jessica Thompson	Raman Ramakrishnan	28:56	c. 2006	?	Bridge	(Note: Daedalus–Bridge (BRIDGE 9202) 2006)
29	Coull	Roger Coull	Philip Gallaway	Gustav Clarkson	Nicholas Roberts	31:49	2008	St Paul's Church, Birmingham	SOMM	(Note: Coull–SOMM (SOMMCD 096) 2010)
30	Henschel	Christoph Henschel	Markus Henschel	Monika Henschel	Mathias Beyer-Karlshøj	30:51	2008	August Everding Hall, Grünwald	Neos	(Note: Henschel–Neos (NEOS11006) 2012)
31	Kocian	Pavel Hůla	Miloš Černý	Zbyněk Paďourek	Václav Bernášek	29:26	2009	Domovina Studio, Prague	Praga Digitals	(Note: Kocian–Praga Digitals (DSD 250 257) 2009)
32	Tetzlaff	Christian Tetzlaff	Elisabeth Kufferath	Hanna Weinmeister	Tanja Tetzlaff	29:55	2009	Sendesaal Bremen	Avi-Music	(Note: Tetzlaff–Avi-Music (8553202) 2010)
33	Vertavo	Berit Cardas	Øyvor Volle	Henninge Landaas	Bjørg Lewis	30:52	2010	Østre Fredrikstad Church	LAWO Classics	(Note: Vertavo–LAWO Classics (LWC1201) 2020)
34	Dante	Krysia Osostowicz	Giles Francis	Judith Busbridge	Bernard Gregor-Smith	31:01	2010	Potton Hall, Suffolk	Hyperion	(Note: Dante–Hyperion (CDA 67845) 2011)
35	Kamus	Terhi Paldanius	Jukka Untamala	Jussi Tuhkanen	Petja Kainulainen	30:07	2014	Schauman Hall, Pietersaari	Alba	(Note: Kamus–Alba (ABCD 383) 2015)
36	Skyros	Sarah Pizzichemi	James Moat	Justin Kurys	William Braun	32:14	2014	Engel Hall, Union Adventist University	Navona	(Note: Skyros–Navona (NV6005) 2015)
37	Engegård	Arvid Engegård	Alex Robson	Juliet Jopling	Jan Clemens Carlsen	28:37	2015	Bryn Church	BIS	(Note: Engegård–BIS (SACD–2101) 2015)
38	Flinders	Helen Ayres	Shane Chen	Helen Ireland	Zoe Knighton	29:39	2015	Wyselaskie Auditorium, Parkville	ABC Classics	(Note: Flinders–ABC Classics (ABC 481 1982) 2015)
39	Ehnes	James Ehnes	Amy Schwartz Moretti	Richard Yongjae O'Neill	Robert deMaine	31:38	2015	Potton Hall, Suffolk	Onyx Classics	(Note: Ehnes–Onyx Classics (ONYX 4163) 2016)
40	Leipzig	Conrad Muck	Tilman Büning	Ivo Bauer	Matthias Moosdorf	31:21	2016	Marienmünster Abbey	MDG	(Note: Leipzig–MDG (MDG 307 1957–2) 2016)
41	Aizuri	Emma Frucht	Miho Saegusa	Ayane Kozasa	Karen Ouzounian	29:39	2022	Sauder Concert Hall, Goshen College	Azica	(Note: Aizuri–Azica (ACD–71359) 2023)

== Literature ==
- Beat Föllmi (ed.): Das Streichquartett in der ersten Hälfte des 20. Jahrhunderts (German), Verlag Hans Schneider, Tutzing 2004
- Tomi Mäkelä: Jean Sibelius und seine Zeit (German), Laaber-Verlag, Regensburg 2013
- Ulrich Wilker: "Ein fernes Murmeln aus einer fernen Welt". Zu Jean Sibelius’ Streichquartett "Voces intimae" d-Moll op. 56 (German), in: Stefan Börnchen/Claudia Liebrand (eds.): Lauschen und Überhören. Literarische und mediale Aspekte auditiver Offenheit, Wilhelm Fink Verlag, Paderborn 2020, p .193–211
