= The Favourite (soundtrack) =

The Favourite (Original Motion Picture Soundtrack)

Soundtrack album by various artists
- Released: 7 January 2019
- Genres: Classical music; baroque
- Length: 78:34
- Label: Decca Records

The Favourite (Original Motion Picture Soundtrack) is the soundtrack to the 2018 film of the same name released by Decca Records on 7 January 2019. The album featured baroque music pieces, from composers such as Henry Purcell, Antonio Vivaldi, George Frideric Handel, and Johann Sebastian and Wilhelm Friedemann Bach, and pieces from romantic composers Franz Schubert and Robert Schumann, 20th-century composers Olivier Messiaen and Luc Ferrari, and the 21st-century composer Anna Meredith. The track "Skyline Pigeon" from Elton John's debut album Empty Sky (1969) was played in the film's closing credits.

== Reception ==
Matthew Strauss of Pitchfork wrote "The Favourite’s soundtrack, in turn, is a fussy but amusing collection, refusing to commit to a mood more distinct than emotional unrest." Mark Kermode of The Guardian wrote "A soundtrack that lurches from the lush strains of Handel, Purcell and Vivaldi to the experimental edginess of Anna Meredith via Elton John’s harpsichord adds to the off-kilter atmosphere, keeping the audience on their toes – alert, unsettled, and hugely entertained."

Teo van den Broeke of GQ wrote that the soundtrack is a "monorhythmic spree of baroque hits as pacey as it is foreboding". Aline G. Damas of The Harvard Crimson wrote "The soundtrack, consisting largely of plucked stringed staccatos as well as grand organ themes, does a fantastic job of pressing scenes forward. The dissonance of these sounds, though eerie, keeps the viewer on edge during the most terse scenes."

== Track listing ==
No.	Title	Artist(s)	Length
1.	"Concerto Grosso in B-Flat, Op. 6, No. 7, HWV 325: 1. Largo (George Frideric Handel)"	Orchestra "Classic Music Studio" & Alexander Titov	1:11
2.	"Harpsichord Concerto in A Minor, F.45: 3. Allegro Ma Non Tanto (Wilhelm Friedemann Bach)"	Brigitte Haudebourg, Orchestre Pro Arte De Munich & Kurt Redel	6:19
3.	"Didascalies (Luc Ferrari)"	Jean-Philippe Collard & Vincent Royer	15:07
4.	"Viola d'amore Concerto in A Minor, RV 397: 1. Vivace (Antonio Vivaldi)"	Ars Antigua & Rachel Barton Pine	3:10
5.	"Trumpet Sonata in D Major, Z. 850: 2. Adagio (Henry Purcell)"	John Eliot Gardiner, English Baroque Soloists & David Blackadder	1:32
6.	"Songs For The M8: Movement II (Anna Meredith)"	Renoir Quartet	2:19
7.	"La Nativité du Seigneur: 7. Jésus accepte la Souffrance (Olivier Messiaen)"	Olivier Latry	4:56
8.	"Pastorale in F Major, BWV 590: 3. Aria (Johann Sebastian Bach)"	Miklós Teleki	3:03
9.	"Fantasia in C Minor, BWV 562 (Johann Sebastian Bach)"	Peter Hurford	5:55
10.	"Prelude (Fantasy) and Fugue in G Minor, BWV 542 - "Great": 1. Praeludium (Fantasy) (Johann Sebastian Bach)"	Simon Preston	5:11
11.	"Songs For The M8: Movement V (Anna Meredith)"	Renoir Quartet	1:55
12.	"Harpsichord Concerto in D Major, F.41: 2. Andante (Wilhelm Friedemann Bach)"	Brigitte Haudebourg, Orchestre Pro Arte De Munich & Kurt Redel	6:42
13.	"Violin Concerto in E Minor, RV 277 "Il Favorito": 2. Andante (Antonio Vivaldi)"	Sonatori de la Gioiosa Marca & Giuliano Carmignola	4:04
14.	"Water Music Suite No. 1 in F, HWV 348: 2. Adagio e staccato (George Frideric Handel)"	The English Concert & Trevor Pinnock	2:15
15.	"Piano Sonata No. 21 in B-Flat, D.960: 2. Andante sostenuto (Franz Schubert)"	Artur Schnabel	11:18
16.	"Skyline Pigeon"	Elton John	3:37
Total length:			78:34
