= Ulrich Koch =

German violinist (1921–1996)

- Born: 14 March 1921; Braunschweig, Germany
- Died: 7 June 1996 (aged 75) Tokyo, Japan
- Genres: Classical
- Occupations: Musician, educator
- Instrument: Viola
- Formerly of: Cappella Coloniensis; Stuttgarter Kammerorchester; Collegium Aureum; Lucerne Festival Strings; Bell'Arte String Trio
- Award: Bundesverdienstkreuz am Bande (1981)

Ulrich Koch (14 March 1921 – 7 June 1996) was a German violist.

== Life ==
Born in Braunschweig, Koch received violin lessons from Ion Voicu in Berlin. In 1945 he worked with the orchestra of the Staatstheater Braunschweig, from 1949 in the Südwestfunkorchester Baden-Baden, as solo violist. In 1955 he became director of the master class at the Hochschule für Musik Freiburg, from 1967 professor for viola himself. He shaped a generation of viola students and produced internationally renowned violists. Well-known Koch students include Hatto Beyerle, Ruth Killius, Vincent Royer, Henrik Schaefer, Hermann Voss and Tabea Zimmermann. From 1990 he worked as a teacher at the Musashino Academia Musicae in Tokyo.

As a soloist, he became particularly known as an interpreter of the works of classical modernism. Of the classics, he liked most to play Johann Sebastian Bach. Thanks to numerous concerts at home and abroad he attracted attention through premieres and world premieres, among others in the context of the Donaueschinger Musiktage for modern music and by means of commissioned compositions from the Südwestfunk of Baden-Baden. Recordings with works by Paul Hindemith, Karl Amadeus Hartmann, Béla Bartók, Jean Françaix, Darius Milhaud, Raymond Baervoets, Karel Husa, Johann Nepomuk David, Miklós Rózsa document his manifold work. He has also worked for many years with renowned ensembles such as the Cappella Coloniensis, with which he toured Russia in 1961, the Stuttgart Chamber Orchestra, to whom he owed his first stay in Japan in 1953, the Collegium Aureum, the Lucerne Festival Strings and the Bell'Arte String Trio. He gave international master classes in Assisi. Koch also devoted himself to playing old instruments (viola pomposa, viola d'amore). Since the nineties, an "Ulrich Koch Prize" has been awarded to outstanding young viola players within the Wolfgang Marschner International Competition.

Ulrich Koch died in Tokyo on 7 June 1996.

== Awards ==
- 1981: Bundesverdienstkreuz am Bande.
