= Melos Quartet =

String quartet

Melos Quartett Stuttgart
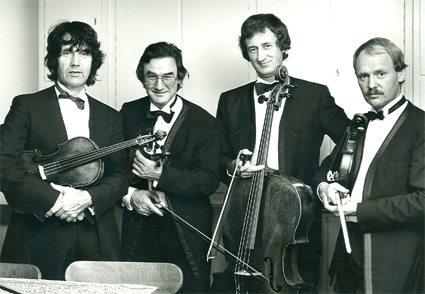
- Melos Quartet (from L to R: H. Voss, W. Melcher, P. Buck, G. Voss) in 1977

Background information
- Also known as: Melos String Quartet, Melos Quartett
- Origin: Stuttgart, Germany
- Genre: Classical
- Occupation: Chamber ensemble
- Years active: 1965–2005
- Labels: Bayer Records, BIS, Deutsche Grammophon Gesellschaft, EMI, Harmonia Mundi, Hännsler Classics, Intercord, Novalis, Philips, SWR-digital, Tower Records (Japan releases), Vera Verlag GmbH, Vox Candide, Vox Turnabout
- Past members: Wilhelm Melcher, 1st violin; Gerhard Voss, 2nd violin (1965–1993); Ida Bieler, 2nd violin (1993–2005); Hermann Voss, viola; Peter Buck, cello

The Melos Quartet was a much-recorded, Stuttgart-based string quartet active from 1965 until 2005, when its first violinist died. It also went by the name Melos-Quartett-Stuttgart, partly to distinguish itself from the equally prominent chamber group the Melos Ensemble of London.

== Origins and activities ==
Melos Quartett Stuttgart was founded in October 1965 by four young members of well-known German chamber orchestras. The name Melos, an ancient Greek word for singing, and the root of the word melody, was suggested by the combination of the names Melcher and Voss, to indicate their purpose as distinct individuals seeking musical harmony together.

Leader Melcher of Hamburg studied with Erich Röhn and with both Pina Carmirelli and Arrigo Pelliccia of the Boccherini Quintet in Rome. He won the International Chamber Music Competition in Venice in 1962 and became concertmaster of the Hamburg Symphony Orchestra the next year. The Voss brothers are Rhinelanders. They studied with Sandor Végh, and Hermann continued as a pupil of Ulrich Koch, becoming solo violist of the Stuttgart Chamber Orchestra. Cellist Buck is a Swabian who studied in Düsseldorf and Freiburg and with Ludwig Hoelscher in Stuttgart. Gerhard Voss and Buck were members of the Württemberg Chamber Orchestra.

The group made its début as a string quartet in January 1966. Its first recitals produced encouraging results – a grant from the "Musikleben" Foundation, assistance from the "Concerts by Young Artists" section of the German "Musikrat", participation in the Paris World Congress of the "Jeunesses Musicales", a "Prix Américain" and nomination as the best Quartet at the International Musical Competition held in Geneva; in 1967 the group won a prize in the "Heitor Villa-Lobos Quartet Competition" in Rio de Janeiro.

Very quickly engagements came and it was not long before the four members gave up their positions as solo players in various chamber orchestras becoming free-lance artists in order to concentrate entirely on their work as an ensemble. This was in September 1967. Stuttgart then became the centre of their activities and they rented a wooden hut belonging to a kindergarten, renovating it themselves before they used it as their studio. in 1969 only they gave 105 concerts throughout the world, and had their first television appearance.

They have made various tours in the Middle East, South America (1971), as well as making appearances in all European countries, the Near East and Far East, in North America, Canada, Japan, Australia and South Africa (1972), getting as far as Novosibirsk in Russia. They became the first West German musicians to play in Volgograd (Stalingrad), in 1973, in concerts commemorating the events of 1943. By 1975, when the Schubert integral recordings were completed and issued, the Quartet also held a teaching post at the Stuttgart School of Music.

Among others, the Quartet collaborated with Arthur Rubinstein, Mstislav Rostropovich, Georg Solti, Narciso Yepes, Piero Farulli, Gérard Caussé, Michel Portal and Dietrich Fischer-Dieskau.

After 28 years, Gerhard Voss left the quartet in 1993 due to "irreconcilable differences of opinion" with the other members; he was replaced by Ida Bieler. A "Les Adieux" farewell tour was planned for 2005, but it was canceled due to the death of Wilhelm Melcher just before his 65th birthday, when the quartet was disbanded.

== Personnel ==
name	dates	role	period
Wilhelm Melcher	(*1940 – †2005)	1st violin (founder & leader)	1965–2005
Gerhard Voss	(*1939)	2nd violin (founder)	1965–1993
Ida Bieler	(*1950)	2nd violin	1993–2005
Hermann Voss	(*1934)	viola (founder)	1965–2005
Peter Buck	(*1937 – †2024)	cello (founder)	1965–2005

== Instruments ==
During the period of activity, the instruments of the quartet members were:

- 1st violin: Matteo Goffriller (18th Cent.) until 1972 | Antonio Stradivari (1720) [a loan for the 1971 South America Tour] | Domenico Montagnana (1731) from 1972 to 1975 | Carlo Bergonzi (c.1743–47) from 1975 to 2005;
- 2nd violin: Michele Angelo Bergonzi (18th Cent.) until 1972 | Carlo Annibale Tononi (18th Century) from 1972 to 1975 | Giovanni Battista Rogeri (1701) from 1975;
- viola: Carlo Ferdinando Landolfi (18th Cent.);
- cello: Francesco Ruggieri (1682).

== Honors and awards ==
- 1966: Winner of the "International Geneva Music Competition"
- 1967: Prizewinner of the "Concurso Internacional de Quarteto de Cordas Villa-Lobos" (Villa-Lobos String Quartet Competition) in Rio de Janeiro
- 1990: Order of Merit of the Federal Republic of Germany

== Documentaries ==
- Das Melos-Quartett – Vier Leben für die Kammermusik (Four Lives for Chamber Music) The members of the Melos Quartet talk about their lives and experiences around music. As a common theme, they perform Franz Schubert's Quartet No.15 – Film by Klaus Kirschner (1988) OCLC 915981059
- Melos String Quartet | Japanese TV Interview Interview with the Melos Quartet on Japanese TV prior to their concert with pieces by Schubert, Mozart and Beethoven. (Live in Japan 26/3/1990)

== Recording career ==
Alongside a record deal with the "Intercord Ton GmbH" label (Intercord) started in 1968, in 1969 the group signed a five-year contract with the "Deutsche Grammophon GmbH" (DGG) record company, and spent 25 days that year making recordings for SWR radio and commercial release. They obtained the first prize of the String Quartet Foundation sponsored by German industry in 1970, and in 1972 they entered into a further contract with DGG for the complete recordings of Schubert, Cherubini, and later, the Mendelssohn, Brahms, Schumann and Beethoven string quartets.

By 1975 the group had built up a repertoire of 120 works, including the complete Beethoven, Schubert, Cherubini, Mendelssohn, Schumann, Brahms, Janáček quartets, and works by Haydn, Mozart, Hugo Wolf, Pfitzner, Verdi, Donizetti, Debussy, Smetana, Kodály, Hindemith, Bartók, Alban Berg, Gian Francesco Malipiero, Witold Lutosławski, Milko Kelemen, Robert Wittinger and Josef Maria Horváth. They made a conscious decision to have a wide-ranging repertoire in order to avoid getting stuck to any particular period.

For Deutsche Grammophon label, they taped Schubert's String Quintet with Mstislav Rostropovich as second cellist; Mozart's 10 Great String Quartets, the complete cycles of Mendelssohn, Schumann, Brahms, Cherubini and Schubert; they recorded the complete Beethoven cycle twice (1969/70 for Intercord and 1983/85 for DGG), and later the two Janáček's Quartets. Again for DGG, with violists Franz Beyer and Piero Farulli, they recorded the 6 String Quintets by Mozart. They taped also many unusual repertoire for SWR Radio, which has been since released digitally.

In the early 1990s the Melos-Quartett signed a second important recording contract with the "Harmonia Mundi" label, where from 1993 onwards they recorded exclusively with the new line-up featuring Ida Bieler on 2nd violin.

Violist Hermann Voss and cellist Peter Buck, are featured in the recording with the Verdi Quartet (German string quartet founded in 1985 in Cologne) of the 2 Quintets and the 2 Sextets for strings by Brahms (rec: Deutschlandfunk, Kammermusiksaal, 2007/2008 | 4CD box – Hänssler Classic HC16084 ℗2018).

== Complete Recordings ==
=== LP & CD releases ===
(alphabetical order by Composer)

- BARTÓK – String Quartet No.3, Sz. 85, BB 93 (**first recording made for DGG** [+ KODALY; WEINER] | rec: 2–3.X.1969 | LP – DGG 139 450 ℗1970 | Japan reprint: CD – Tower Records PROC-2102 ℗2017)
- BEETHOVEN – Die Streichquartette -Gesamtausgabe- ('1st'-rec: Südwest-Tonstudio Jansen, Stuttgart, 1969/70 | 12LP set – Intercord 29319-1 ℗1970; Intercord 65977-1 "Special Edition" ℗1970)
  - Die frühen Streichquartette – The Early String Quartets: Op.18 Nr.1-6 / Op.14 No.1 (3LP – Intercord 955-09 Z/1-3 [without Op.14/1] ℗1969 | reprint: 4LP – Intercord 185.750 ℗1970 | 3CD – Intercord INT 885.750 ℗1986)
  - Die mittleren Streichquartette – The Middle String Quartets: Op.59 Nr.1–3 / Op.74 / Op.95 (4LP – Intercord 959-09 Z/1-4 ℗1969 | reprint: 4LP – Intercord 185.751 ℗1970 | 3CD – Intercord INT 885.751 ℗1986)
  - Die späten Streichquartette – The Late String Quartets: Op.127 / Opp.130–133 / Op.135 (5LP – Intercord 964-09 Z/1-5 [with Op.14/1] ℗1970 | reprint: 4LP – Intercord 185.752 ℗1970 | 3CD – Intercord INT 885.752 ℗1987)
- BEETHOVEN – Die Streichquartette ('2nd'-rec: Zentralsaal, Bamberg, 1983/85 | 10LP / 9CD – DGG separate releases | 9CD boxed-set "Limited Edition – 25 Years" – DGG 431 094-2 ℗1990 | Japan reprint: 8CD box – Tower Records POCG-9141/8 ℗1991)
  - Die frühen Streichquartette: Op.18 Nos.1–6 (rec: VI., VII. & IX.1983 | 3LP – DGG 410 971-1 | 3CD – DGG 410 971-2 ℗1984)
  - Die mittleren Streichquartette: Op.14 No.1 / Op.59 Nos.1–3 / Op.74 / Op.95 (rec: II. & VII.1984 | 3LP – DGG 415 342-1 | 3CD – DGG 415 342-2 ℗1985)
  - Die späten Streichquartette: Opp.127-130-131-132-135 / "Great Fugue" Op.133 (rec: XII.1984 & V.1985 [Opp.130–132] | 4LP – DGG 415 676-1 | 3CD – DGG 415 676-2 ℗1986)
- BOCCHERINI – Quintets for Guitar and Strings: No.4 in D major, G.448 "Fandango" / No.9 in C major, G.453 "La ritirata di Madrid" / No.7 in E minor, G.451 (+ Narciso Yepes, guitar; Lucero Tena, castanets [4] | rec: Hamburg-Rahlstedt, Polydor Studios, III.1970 | LP – DGG 2530 069 ℗1971 | reprint: CD – DGG Resonance 429 512-2 ℗1990; CD – DGG Classikon 449 852-2 ℗1997; CD – DGG The Originals 477 7112 ℗2007)
- BRAHMS – String Quartets: No.3 in B-flat major, Op.67 / No.1 in C minor, Op.51/1 ('1st'-rec: 1972 | [Op.51/1 only + HAYDN Op.76/4 in B-flat major, Hob.III:78 "Sunrise" | sample copy – not for sale (grey label) LP – DGG 642 014 ℗1973] LP – DGG 2530 345 ℗1973)
- BRAHMS – Complete String Quartets: No.1 in C minor, Op.51/1 / No.2 in A minor, Op.51/2 / No.3 in B-flat major, Op.67 ('2nd'-rec: Zentralsaal, Bamberg, V.1986 [2 + SCHUMANN 2,3], VI.1987 [1,3 + SCHUMANN 1] | 3CD – DGG 423 670-2 ℗1988 | reprint: 3CD – Newton Classics 8802051 ℗2011)
- BRAHMS – String Quintet No.2 in G major, Op.111 / Clarinet Quintet in B minor, Op.115 (+ Gérard Caussé, 2nd viola & Michel Portal, clarinet | rec: VII.1990 | CD – Harmonia Mundi HMC 9013149 ℗1991 | reprint: CD – Harmonia Mundi HMA 1951349 ℗2001)
- BRUCKNER – String Quintet in F major, WAB.112 (+ Enrique Santiago, 2nd viola | '1st'-rec: II.1969 [+ WOLF] | LP – Vox Candide CE 31014 ℗1969; LP – Intercord INT 160.806 ℗1975; LP – Vox Turnabout TVC 37005 ℗1979 | 2LP set – Intercord 180.854 [+ SMETANA; JANACEK 2] ℗1982 | reprint: CD – Intercord INT 820.744 [+ HAYDN Op.20/4] ℗1988)
- BRUCKNER – String Quintet in F major, WAB.112 / Intermezzo in D minor, WAB.113 (+ Enrique Santiago, 2nd viola | '2nd'-rec: V.1992 | CD – Harmonia Mundi HMC 901421 ℗1993)
- CHERUBINI – Complete String Quartets: No.1 in E-flat major (1814) / No.2 in C major (1829) / No.3 in D minor (1834) / No.4 in E major (1835) / No.5 in F major (1835) / No.6 in A minor (1837) (rec: VI.1973 [1,2]; IV.1974 [5]; X.1974 [3]; II.1975 [4,6] | 3LP set – DGG Archiv Produktion 2723 044 ℗1976 | reprint: 3CD box – DGG 429 185-2 ℗1989; 3CD box – Brilliant Classics 93891 ℗2009; CD #29-30-31 in: 50CD box – DGG Archiv Produktion 00289 479 5555 ℗2016)
- DEBUSSY – String Quartet in G minor, Op.10/L.85 (rec: Liederhalle, Stuttgart, II.1979 [+ RAVEL] | LP – DGG 419 750 ℗1979 | reprint: CD – DGG The Originals 479 0529 [+ KODALY] ℗2012)
- DVOŘÁK – Late String Quartets: No.13 in G major, Op.106/B.192 / No.14 in A-flat major, Op.105/B.193 (w. Ida Bieler, 2nd violin | rec: XI.1999 | CD – Harmonia Mundi HMC 901709 ℗2001)
- DVOŘÁK – String Quartet No.9 in D minor, Op.34/B.75 / Piano Quintet No.2 in A major, Op.81/B.155 / String Quintet No.3 in E-flat major "American", Op.97/B.180 / String Quartet No.12 in F major "American", Op.96/B.179 (w. Ida Bieler, 2nd violin + Karl Engel, piano [op.81] & Gérard Caussé, 2nd viola [op.97] | rec: III.1994 [Op.96] | 2CD – Harmonia Mundi HMX 2901509.10 ℗1997/1995/2006 | 2CD – HMG 501509.10 ℗2018)
- FORTNER, Wolfgang (*1907 – †1987) – String Quartet No.4 (1975) (Quartet Recital [+ HAYDN; RAVEL] | live rec: Schwetzingen, 9.V.1979 | CD – Hänssler Classic 93.716 ℗2012)
- FROMM-MICHAELS, Ilse (*1888 – †1986) – "Musica Larga" for Clarinet and String Quartet (1944) (Freie Akademie der Künste in Hamburg [+ Frank WOHLFAHRT] | + Jost Michaels, clarinet | rec: 1968 | comp. LP 10" – Vera Verlag GmbH Hamburg SWT-14 ℗1968)
- HAYDN – 4 Famous String Quartets: No.62 in C major, Op.76/3, Hob.III:77 "Emperor" / No.63 in B-flat major, Op.76/4, Hob.III:78 "Sunrise" / No.32 in C major, Op.33/3, Hob.III:39 "Bird" / No.27 in D major, Op.20/4, Hob.III:34 "Sun" (rec: Stuttgart, Südwest Tonstudio, 1968 [Opp.76/3, 76/4, 33/3] & 1970 [Op.20/4] | 2LP – Intercord INT 180.802 ℗1976 | reprint: LP – Intercord 26 830-0 [Opp.76/3, 76/4] ℗1981 | 3CD Comp. – Intercord INT 885.906 ℗1991 | CD – Intercord INT 820.744 [Op.20/4 + BRUCKNER Quintet] ℗1988 | 2CD – EMI 'Seraphim' 5 69116 ℗1996 | CD – EMI Classics 'Red Line' 5 73530 [Opp.76/3, 76/4, 33/3] ℗1999)
- HAYDN – String Quartet No.63 in B-flat major, Op.76/4, Hob.III:78 "Sunrise" (rec: 1972 [+ BRAHMS Op.51/1] sample copy – not for sale (grey label) LP – DGG 642 014 ℗1973)
- HAYDN – String Quartet No.64 in D major, Op.76/5, Hob.III:79 "Erdödy" (Quartet Recital [+ FORTNER; RAVEL] | live rec: Schwetzingen, 9.V.1979 | CD – Hänssler Classic 93.716 ℗2012)
- JANÁČEK – String Quartet No.2 "Intimate Letters", JW.7/13 (rec: 1973 [+ SMETANA] | LP – Intercord 29.730-9 K / INT 160.803 ℗1973 | LP – Philips 6542.520 ℗1980 | 2LP set – Intercord 180.854 [+ BRUCKNER Quintet; WOLF] ℗1982 | reprint: CD – Intercord INT 820.743 [+ WOLF] ℗1988)
- JANÁČEK – Complete String Quartets: No.1 "Kreutzer Sonata", JW.7/8 / No.2 "Intimate Letters", JW.7/13 (rec: V.1991 | CD – Harmonia Mundi HMG 501380 ℗1992)
- KELEMEN, Milko (*1924 – †2018) – "Sonnets" for String Quartet (1987) (rec: Stuttgart, SDR Funkstudio, 17.II.1988 | CD – BIS 742 ℗1995)
- KODÁLY – String Quartet No.2, Op.10 (**first recording made for DGG** [+ BARTÓK; WEINER] | rec: IX.1969 | LP – DGG 139 450 ℗1970 | reprint: CD – DGG The Originals 479 0529 [+ RAVEL; DEBUSSY] ℗2012 | Japan reprint: CD – Tower Records PROC-2102 ℗2017)
- MENDELSSOHN – Complete String Quartets: (No.0) in E-flat major, oh.Op. / No.1 in E-flat major, Op.12 / No.2 in A minor, Op.13 / No.3 in D major, Op.44/1 / No.4 in E minor, Op.44/2 / No.5 in E-flat major, Op.44/3 / No.6 in F minor, Op.80 / 4 Pieces for String Quartet, Op.81 (rec: II.1976 [1]; VI.1977 [4]; VI.1980 [2,6]; X.1980 [5]; II.1981 [0,3]; X.1981 [Op.81] | 4LP set – DGG 2740 267 ℗1978/1982 | reprint: 3CD box – DGG 415 883-2 ℗1987 | Japan reprint: 3CD box – Tower Records UCCG-4333/5 ℗2009)
- MOZART – Die Preussischen Quartette (+ Hoffmeister Quartett): No.20 in D Major, K.499 "Hoffmeister" / No.21 in D Major, K.575 / No.22 in B-flat major, K.589 / No.23 in F major, K.590 ('1st'-rec: 1973 | 2LP – Intercord 29722-6 Z/1-2 ℗1974 | 3LP set – Intercord INT 185.701 [+ Clarinet Quintet & 5 Fugues] ℗1981 | **no CD reprint, except K.499 coupled with Clarinet Quintet**)
- MOZART – Die 10 großen Streichquartette (rec: 17–20.II.1976 [K.428,458]; 16–17.XI.1976 [K.387,421]; 5–6.VI.1977 [K.464,465]; 15–16.II.1979 [K.589]; 19–20.VI.1980 [K.590]; 23–24.II.1981 [K.499]; 10.V.1983 [K.575] | 5LP set – DGG 415 587-1 ℗1985 | Japan reprint: 4CD box – Tower Records PROC-2992/5 ℗2017)
  - 6 Haydn-Quartets: No.14 in G major, K.387 "Spring" / No.15 in D minor, K.421/417b / No.16 in E-flat major, K.428/421b / No.17 in B-flat major, K.458 "Hunt" / No.18 in A major, K.464 / No.19 in C major, K.465 "Dissonance" (rec: Stuttgart, Liederhalle, 17–20.II.1976 [16,17]; 16–17.XI.1976 [14–15]; 5–6.VI.1977 [18–19] | LP separate releases – [14–15]: DGG 2530 898 ℗1977; [16–17]: DGG 2530 800 ℗1977; [18–19]: DGG 2530 981 ℗1978 | 3LP set – DGG 2740 249 ℗1978 | reprint: 3CD box – DGG 415 870-2 ℗1990)
  - Hoffmeister & 3 Prussian-Quartets: No.20 in D Major, K.499 "Hoffmeister" / No.21 in D Major, K.575 / No.22 in B-flat major, K.589 / No.23 in F major, K.590 ('2nd'-rec: Stuttgart, Liederhalle, II.1979 [22]; VI.1980 [23]; II.1981 [20]; Bamberg, Zentralsaal, V.1983 [21] | LP separate releases – [20–21]: DGG 410 998-1 ℗1984; [22–23]: DGG 2531 320 ℗1981 | reprint: 2CD box – DGG 431 153-2 ℗1990)
- MOZART – Clarinet Quintet in A major, K.581 "Stadler" / 5 Fugues for String Quartet, K.405 (transcribed from BACH, WTC Book II: Nos.2,7,9,8,5) (+ Julia Rayson, clarinet | rec: 1973 | LP – Intercord 29731-7 K ℗1974 | 3LP set – Intercord INT 185.701 [+ Hoffmeister & 3 Prussian-Quartets] ℗1981 | reprint: CD – EMI Classics 'Red Line' 5 74419 [+ MOZART K.499] ℗1998)
- MOZART – Piano Quartets: No.1 in G minor, K.478 / No.2 in E-flat major, K.493 (+ Georg Solti, piano | H.Voss, viola [1]; G.Voss, viola [2] | rec: Frankfurt, Alte Oper, VI.1984 [1]; London, St.John's Smith Square, VI.1985 [2] | CD – Decca 417190 ℗1986 | reprint: CD – Eloquence 442 8221 ℗2006)
- MOZART – Complete String Quintets: No.1 in B-flat major, K.174 / No.2 in C minor, K.406/516b / No.3 in C major, K.515 / No.4 in G minor, K.516 / No.5 in D major, K.593 / No.6 in E-flat major, K.614 (rec: VII.1986 [3,4]; XII.1987 [1,2]; 1989 [5,6] | + Franz Beyer, 2nd viola [1–4]; Piero Farulli, 2nd viola [5,6] | CD – [1,2]: DGG 423 697-2 ℗1988 / CD Japan reprint: UCG-90624 ℗2016; CD – [3,4]: DGG 419 773-2 ℗1987 / CD Japan reprint: UCG-90625 ℗2016; CD – [5,6]: DGG 429 777-2 ℗1990 / CD Japan reprint: UCG-90626 ℗2016 | 3CD box – DGG 431 694-2 ℗1990)
- PFLÜGER, Hans Georg (*1944 – †1999) – String Quartet (1984) (comp. CD – Bayer Records BR 100040 ℗1989)
- RAVEL – String Quartet in F major, M.35 (rec: Liederhalle, Stuttgart, II.1979 [+ DEBUSSY] | LP – DGG 419 750 ℗1979 | reprint: CD – DGG The Originals 479 0529 [+ KODALY] ℗2012)
- RAVEL – String Quartet in F major, M.35 (Quartet Recital [+ HAYDN; FORTNER] | live rec: Schwetzingen, 9.V.1979 | CD – Hänssler Classic 93.716 ℗2012)
- SCHUBERT – Complete String Quartets: No.1 in G minor|B-flat major, D.18 / No.2 in C major, D.32 / No.3 in B-flat major, D.36 / No.4 in C major, D.46 / No.5 in B-flat major, D.68 / No.6 in D major, D.74 / No.7 in D major, D.94 / Quartet Movement in C minor, D.103 / No.8 in B-flat major, D.112 (Op.ph.168) / No.9 in G minor, D.173 / No.10 in E-flat major D.87 (Op.ph.125/1) / No.11 in E major D.353 (Op.ph.125/2) / No.12 in C minor, D.703 "Quartettsatz" / No.13 in A minor, D.804 (Op.29) "Rosamunde" / No.14 in D minor, D.810 "Death and the Maiden" / No.15 in G major, D.887 (Op.ph.161) (rec: Stuttgart, Liederhalle, Mozartsaal, XI.1971 [D.18,32,36]; V.1972 [D.46]; X.1972 [D.94]; IV.1973 [D.68,87,112]; IV.1974 [D.353]; X.1974 [D.74]; XII.1974 [D.703,804,810,887]; II.1975 [D.103]; III.1975 [D.173] | LP – separate releases: DGG ℗1973/1975 | 7LP set – DGG 2740 123 ℗1975 | reprint: 6CD set – DGG 419 879-2 ℗1990 | 6CD box – DGG 463 151-2 ℗1999 | Japan reprint: 2CD box – Tower Records PROC-2096/7 [Nos.12–15 & D.103] ℗2012)
- SCHUBERT – String Quartets: No.13 in A minor, D.804 (Op.29) "Rosamunde" / No.14 in D minor, D.810 "Death and the Maiden" (rec: Neumarkt in der Oberpfalz, Reitstadel, XI.1989 | CD – Novalis 150 058-2 ℗1990 | reprint: CD – Harmonia Mundi HMA 1951408 ℗2001 | Japan reprint: CD – King Records KICC 2657 ℗2017)
- SCHUBERT – The Late String Quartets: No.12 in C minor, D.703 "Quartettsatz" / No.13 in A minor, D.804 (Op.29) "Rosamunde" / No.14 in D minor, D.810 "Death and the Maiden" / No.15 in G major, D.887 (Op.ph.161) (rec: XI.1989 [13,14] **same recording of Novalis release**; IX.1991 [12,15] | 2CD – Harmonia Mundi HMC 901408.09 ℗1992)
- SCHUBERT – String Quintet in C major, D.956 (+ Mstislav Rostropovich, 2nd cello | rec: Zurich, Tonhalle, IX.1977 | LP – DGG 2530 980 ℗1978 | reprint: CD – DGG 415 373-2 ℗1989; CD – DGG 453 668-2 ℗1997; CD – DGG 477 6357 ℗2007)
- SCHUBERT – String Quintet in C major, D.956 (w. Ida Bieler, 2nd violin + Wolfgang Boettcher, 2nd cello | rec: X.1993 | CD – Harmonia Mundi HMA 1951494 ℗1994)
- SCHUMANN – Complete String Quartets: No.1 in A minor, Op.41/1 / No.2 in F major, Op.41/2 / No.3 in A major, Op.41/3 (rec: Zentralsaal, Bamberg, V.1986 [2,3 + BRAHMS 2], VI.1987 [1 + BRAHMS 1,3] | 3CD – DGG 423 670-2 ℗1988 | reprint: 3CD – Newton Classics 8802051 ℗2011)
- SIBELIUS – String Quartet in D minor, Op.56 "Voces intimae" (w. Ida Bieler, 2nd violin | rec: V.1998 [+ VERDI] | CD – Harmonia Mundi HMC 901671 ℗1998; HMA 1951671 ℗2003)
- SMETANA – String Quartet No.1 in E minor "From my Life" (rec: 1973 [+ JANACEK 2] | LP – Intercord 29.730-9 K / INT 160.803 ℗1973 | LP – Philips 6542.520 ℗1980 | 2LP – Intercord 180.854 [+ BRUCKNER Quintet; WOLF] ℗1982 | reprint: CD – Intercord INT 820.743 [+ WOLF] ℗1988)
- VERDI – String Quartet in E minor (w. Ida Bieler, 2nd violin | rec: V.1998 [+ SIBELIUS] | CD – Harmonia Mundi HMC 901671 ℗1998; HMA 1951671 ℗2003)
- WEINER, Leó – String Quartet No.3 Op.26 (**first recording made for DGG** [+ BARTÓK; KODALY] | rec: 2–3.X.1969 | LP – DGG 139 450 ℗1970 | Japan reprint: CD – Tower Records PROC-2102 ℗2017)
- WOLF – "Italian Serenade" in G minor, for String Quartet (rec: II.1969 [+ BRUCKNER Quintet] | LP – Vox Candide CE 31014 ℗1969; LP – Intercord INT 160.806 ℗1975; LP – Vox Turnabout TVC 37005 ℗1979 | 2LP set – Intercord 180.854 [+ SMETANA; JANACEK 2] ℗1982 | reprint: CD – Intercord INT 820.743 [+ SMETANA; JANACEK 2] ℗1988)

=== Digital releases ===
Exact recording dates are unknown, but traceable from the late 1960s to the mid 1980s. Source: SWR Classic Archive / Presto Classical Ltd. | Provided to YouTube by NAXOS of America. (alphabetical order by Composer)

- ARRIAGA – String Quartet No.3 in E-flat major (radio recording | digital release – SWR10282 ℗2015)
- BARTÓK – String Quartet No.1, Op.7, Sz. 40, BB 52 (+ WEINER | radio recording | digital release – SWR10044 ℗2013)
- BOSE, Hans-Jūrgen von (*1953) – String Quartet No.2 (1976–77) (20th Century String Quartets + KELEMEN, KOKKONEN, STRAVINSKY, WITTINGER | radio recordings | digital release – SWR10160 ℗2014)
- CHERUBINI – String Quartets: No.2 in C major / No.4 in E major (radio recording | digital release – SWR10060 ℗2014)
- DVOŘÁK – String Quartet No.14 in A-flat major, Op.105, B.193 (radio recording | digital release – SWR10086 ℗2014)
- HAYDN – String Quartets: No.16 in A major, Op.9/6, Hob.III:24 / No.7 in A major, Op.2/1, Hob.III:7 / No.19 in C minor, Op.17/4, Hob.III:28 (radio recording | digital release – SWR10126 ℗2014)
- HAYDN – String Quartet No.66 in G major, Op.76/1, Hob.III:81 "Lobkowitz" (+ MOZART | radio recording | digital release – SWR10067 ℗2014)
- HAYDN / attrib. Roman Hoffstetter – String Quartets (spurious): in B-Flat major, Op.3/4, Hob.III:16 / in A major, Op.3/6, Hob.III:18 (radio recording | digital release – SWR10094 ℗2014)
- HINDEMITH – String Quartets: No.3 (previously No.2) in C major, Op.16 (1920) / No.5 (prev. No.4), Op.32 (1932) (radio recording | digital release – SWR10051 ℗2014)
- KELEMEN, Milko (*1924 – †2018) – "Sonnets" for String Quartet (1987) (20th Century String Quartets + BOSE, KOKKONEN, STRAVINSKY, WITTINGER | radio recordings | digital release – SWR10160 ℗2014)
- KOKKONEN, Joonas (*1921 – †1996) – String Quartet No.2 (1966) (20th Century String Quartets + BOSE, KELEMEN, STRAVINSKY, WITTINGER | radio recordings | digital release – SWR10160 ℗2014)
- MOZART – String Quartet No.22, in B-flat major K.589 (+ HAYDN | radio recording | digital release – SWR10067 ℗2014)
- MOZART – Clarinet Quintet in A major, K.581 "Stadler" (+ Ulf Rodenhäuser, clarinet | radio recording | digital release – SWR10523 ℗2018)
- REGER – String Quartet No.4 in E-flat major, Op.109 (radio recording | digital release – SWR10085 ℗2014)
- SHOSTAKOVICH – String Quartets: No.8 in C minor, Op.110 / No.10 in A-flat major, Op.118 (radio recording | digital release – SWR10066 ℗2014)
- STRAVINSKY – 3 Pieces for String Quartet (20th Century String Quartets + BOSE, KELEMEN, KOKKONEN, WITTINGER | radio recordings | digital release – SWR10160 ℗2014)
- VERDI – String Quartet in E minor (radio recording | digital release – SWR10388 ℗2017)
- WEILL – String Quartet in B minor (1918) (radio recording | digital release – SWR10249 ℗2015)
- WEINER, Leó (*1885 – †1960) – String Quartet No.3 in G Major, Op.26 (+ BARTÓK #1 | radio recording | digital release – SWR10044 ℗2013)
- WITTINGER, Róbert (*1945) – String Quartet No.3, Op.20 (20th Century String Quartets + BOSE, KELEMEN, KOKKONEN, STRAVINSKY | radio recordings | digital release – SWR10160 ℗2014)
- ZEMLINSKY – String Quartet No.3, Op.19 (radio recording | digital release – SWR10250 ℗2015)
