= Wilhelm Melcher =

German violinist

Wilhelm Melcher (April 5, 1940 – March 5, 2005) was a German violinist. He was the founder and leader of the Melos Quartet.

== Biography ==
Melcher was born in Hamburg, and studied there and in Rome. In 1962, he won the International Chamber Music Competition in Venice. In 1963, at the age of 23, he became the concertmaster of the Hamburg Symphony Orchestra.

He established a standing quartet with the brothers Gerhard Voss and Hermann Voss, as well as cellist Peter Buck. The quartet was based in Stuttgart, and remained together until Melcher's unexpected death on the eve of a planned farewell tour.

A lover of Italy since he was a boy, he bought a house and moved his home to Tuscany in the Etruscan village of Sorano, in the province of Grosseto.

Wilhelm Melcher played a violin by Carlo Bergonzi (1731).
