= Franz Beyer (musicologist) =

German musicologist (1922–2018)

Franz Beyer (26 February 1922, in Weingarten – 29 June 2018, in Munich) was a German musicologist, who is best known for his revising and restoration of Wolfgang Amadeus Mozart's music, in particular his unfinished Requiem, KV 626, which he restored in the early 1970s.

In 1962 he became professor for viola and chamber music at the Hochschule für Musik und Theater München.

His revision of the Requiem was in keeping with Mozart's actual musical style, not his own interpretation of the work. He has also revised and/or edited works of other composers. He has also played in the Collegium Aureum as a violist, and collaborated with the Melos Quartet as additional violist when performing Mozart's string quintets.

== Awards ==
- 6 August 2002 Medal of the City of Munich, Munich lights - the friends of Munich in silver.
- 2003 Order of Merit, First Class awarded.

== Completions and reconstructions of fragments by Mozart ==
- Requiem in D minor, K. 626
- Mass in C minor ("The Great"), K. 427 (417a)
- "Dir, Seele des Weltalls", cantata, K. 429 (420a; 468a)
- Lo sposo deluso, K. 430 (424a)
- "Männer suchen stets zu naschen", aria for bass and orchestra, K. 433 (416c)
- "Muesst ich auch durch tausend Drachen", aria for tenor and orchestra K. 435 (416b)
- "Schon lacht der holde Frühling", aria for soprano and orchestra, K. 580
- Adagio in F for clarinet and three basset horns, K. Anh. 94 (580a)
- Allegro in F for a quintet for clarinet, basset horn, violin, viola and cello K. Anh. 90 (580b)
- Movement of a trio in G for violin, viola and bass, K. Anh. 66 (562e)
