= Collegium Aureum =

German chamber orchestra

- Chamber orchestra
- Founded: 1962
- Disbanded: 1990s
- Location: Cologne

Collegium Aureum was a chamber orchestra founded in Cologne, Germany, in 1962, which later focused on historically informed performance. Playing typically without conductor, they recorded for three decades, and performed concerts on international tours.

== History ==
Collegium Aureum was initiated by the label Deutsche Harmonia Mundi as a group of instrumental soloists dedicated to the recording of early music to up to the 18th century in what was then called "gerechtes Klangbild“ (fair sound image), later called Historische Aufführungspraxis (historically informed performance). They pursued to play Early music, music of the Classical period and early Romantic music on historic instruments and with the playing techniques of the earlier times, in appropriate venues. They found a suitable location at the Schloss Kirchheim in Schwaben for rehearsals and recordings. As the Renaissance architecture Zedernsaal hall there had the proportions of the golden ratio they called their group Collegium Aureum (Golden Colleagues). The violinist Franzjosef Maier was concert master, other members included the harpsichordists Bob van Asperen and Gustav Leonhardt, flutists Hans-Martin Linde and Barthold Kuijken, oboist Helmut Hucke, violinist Reinhard Goebel, violist Franz Beyer and timpanist Wolfgang Preissler. The ensemble played without conductor, directed by the concert master.

They made recordings from 1962, followed by concerts and productions for radio and television. The group toured in England, France, Japan, Latin America, Northern Africa, the Netherlands, the USSR and the Near East. They recorded for three decades, and disbanded in the 1990s. Several recordings were reissued on CD. A 2016 reviewer called their playing "smooth, elegant and thoughtful". Their 1971 recording of Bach's Christmas Oratorio with the Tölzer Knabenchor, conducted by Gerhard Schmidt-Gaden, was described as a vigorous exploration of the Nativity, with a "gratifying eloquence throughout".
