= Luc Ferrari =

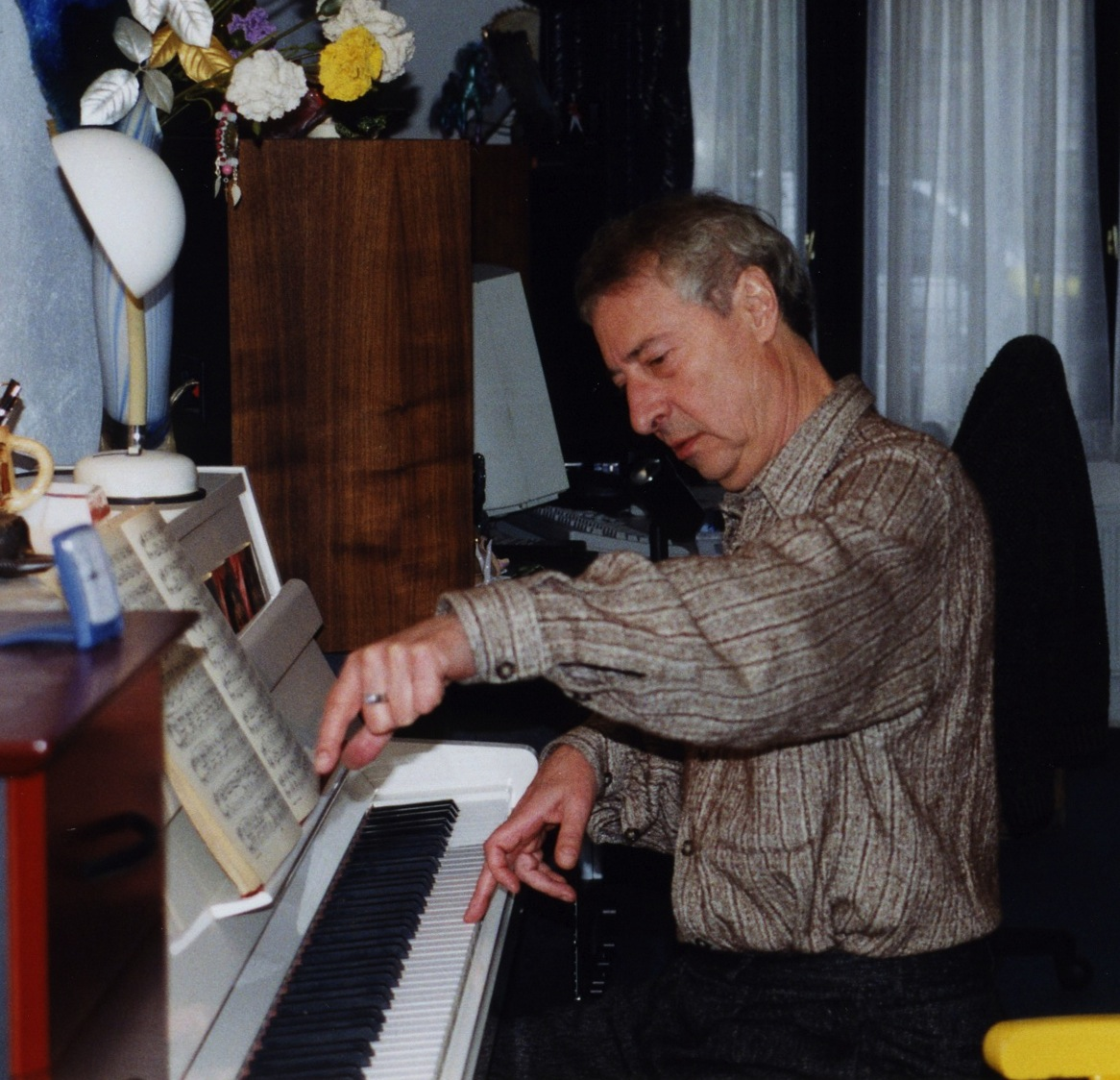

Background information
- Born: Lucien Ferrari; 5 February 1929; Paris, France
- Died: 22 August 2005 (aged 76) Arezzo, Italy
- Genres: Musique concrète, electroacoustic, modern classical
- Occupations: Composer, musician, film director
- Years active: 1950–2005
- Website: lucferrari.org

Lucien Ferrari (5 February 1929 – 22 August 2005) was a French composer and pioneer in musique concrète and electroacoustic music. He was a founding member of RTF's Groupe de Recherches Musicales (GRMC), working alongside composers such as Pierre Schaeffer and Pierre Henry.

== Biography ==
Ferrari was born in Paris and was trained in music at a very young age. He studied the piano under Alfred Cortot, musical analysis under Olivier Messiaen, and composition under Arthur Honegger. His first works were freely atonal. A case of tuberculosis in his youth interrupted his career as a pianist. From then on, he mostly concentrated on musical composition. During this illness, he had the opportunity to become acquainted with the radio receiver, and with pioneers such as Schönberg, Berg, and Webern.

In 1954, Ferrari went to the United States to meet Edgard Varèse, whose Déserts he had heard on the radio, and had impressed him. This seems to have had a great effect on him, with the tape part in Déserts serving as inspiration for Ferrari to use magnetic tape in his own music. In 1958, he co-founded the Groupe de Recherches Musicales with Pierre Schaeffer and François-Bernard Mâche. He taught in institutions around the world, and worked for film, theatre and radio. By the early 1960s, Ferrari had begun work on his Hétérozygote, a piece for magnetic tape which uses ambient environmental sounds to suggest a dramatic narrative. The use of ambient recordings was to become a distinctive part of Ferrari's musical language.

Ferrari's Presque rien No. 1 'Le Lever du jour au bord de la mer (1970) is regarded as a classic of its kind. In it, Ferrari takes a day-long recording of environmental sounds at a Yugoslavian beach and, through editing, makes a piece that lasts just twenty-one minutes. It has been seen as an affirmation of John Cage's idea that music is always going on all around us, and if only we were to stop to listen to it, we would realise this. Ferrari continued to write purely instrumental music as well as his tape pieces. He also made a number of documentary films on contemporary composers in rehearsal, including Olivier Messiaen and Karlheinz Stockhausen.

In 1991, Ferrari composed L'Escalier des aveugles, commissioned by Radio Nacional de España and co-produced by its experimental radio programme Ars Sonora and the French organisation La Muse en Circuit. The work received a special prize at the 1991 Prix Italia.

Ferrari died in Arezzo, Italy, on 22 August 2005, at age 76.

== Discography ==
- Acousmatrix

Petite symphonie intuitive pour un paysage de printemps (1973–74)
Strathoven (1985)
Presque rien avec filles (1989)
Hétérozygote (1963–64)
BVHAAST 9009 Acousmatrix 3 – 1990

- Unheimlich schön

Unheimlich schön (1971)
Coll. Cinéma pour l'oreille
Metamkine MKCD008 1993

- L'Escalier des aveugles

Patajaslotcha (1984)
L'Escalier des aveugles (1991)
Xavier Legasa / Donatienne Michel-Dansac / Michel Musseau (song)
Ensemble Le Banquet, Dir. Olivier Dejours
Ina-grm ina c 2008/Musidisc 201302 – 1993

- Presque rien

Music promenade (1964–69)
Presque rien No.1 – le lever du jour au bord de la mer (1967–70)
Presque rien No.2 – ainsi continue la nuit dans ma tête multiple (1977)
Presque rien avec filles (1989)
Ina-grm 245172 – 1995

- Piano-piano

Suite pour piano (1952)
Antisonate (1953)
Suite hétéroclite (1955)
Visage I (1956)
Fragments du journal intime (1980–82)
Comme une fantaisie dite des réminiscences (1989–91)
Christine Lagniel / Michel Maurer (Piano)
Auvidis Montaigne MO 782110 – 1997

- Cellule 75

Cellule 75 (1975)
Place des Abbesses (1977)
Chris Brown (Piano), William Winant (Perc.)
Tzadik USA – TZ 7033 – 1997

- Interrupteur / Tautologos III

Interrupteur (1967)
Tautologos III (1970)
Ensemble de musique vontemporaine de Paris, Dir. Konstantin Simonovitch
Blue Chopsticks USA BC1, distrib. France : Chronowax – 1999

- Chansons pour le corps – Et si tout entière maintenant

Chansons pour le corps
Elise Caron (Song), Carol Mundinger / Sylvain Frydman (Clar.), Christine Lagniel (Perc.), Michel Maurer (Piano.), Michel Musseau (Synthesizer)
Et si tout entière maintenant (1986–87)
Symphonic story. (Prix Italia 1987) – Text by Colette Fellous
Anne Sée (Voice), Nouvel Orchestre Philharmonique, Dir. Yves Prin.
Mode Records USA MODE 81 – 1999

- Danses Organiques cinéma pour l'oreille

Danses organiques (1971–73)
Elica mpo-3340 – 1999
vinyle LP Elica 4VL 3704 – 2003

- Far-West news

Far-West news episode No.1 (1998–99)
Histoire du plaisir et de la désolation (1979–81)
Nouvel orchestre de France, Dir. Michael Luig.
Signature, France ASIN : B00005Q4KU – distribution Harmonia Mundi – 1999

- Cycle des souvenirs – Exploitation des concepts No.2

Cycle des souvenirs – Exploitation des concepts No.2 (1995–2000)
Blue Chopsticks USA BC8, distrib. France : Chronowax – 2002

- Tautologos and other early electronic works

Étude aux accidents (1958)
Étude aux sons tendus (1958)
Visage V (1958/59)
Tête et queue du dragon (1959–60)
Tautologos I (1961)
Tautologos II (1961)
Und so weiter for piano and tape (1965–66)
(works from 1959 to 1966) EMF and GRM
Gérard Frémy (piano)
EMF CD 037 – 2003

- Comedia dell'amore 224 (1992)

Performers and composers : Jean-Jacques Birgé, Francis Gorgé, Bernard Vitet and Luc Ferrari
Un Drame musical instantané "Opération Blow up" GRRR 2020 – distrib. France : Orkhêstra / Les Allumés du Jazz – 1992

- Impro-micro-acoustique (2001)

Performers and composers : Noël Akchoté, Roland Auzet and Luc Ferrari
Blue Chopsticks, USA BC12 – distrib. France : Chronowax – 2004

- Collection

Collection de petites pièces ou 36 Enfilades pour piano et magnétophone (1985)
Jeu du hasard et de la détermination (1999)
Michel Maurer (Piano.), Françoise Rivalland (Perc.).
Les empreintes digitales, France – distribution Abeille Musique (Nocturne) ED13171 – 2004

- Les Anecdotiques

Les Anecdotiques – Exploitation des Concepts No.6 (2002)
SUB ROSA SR 207 – 2004
Grand Prix 2005 Charles Cros in Memoriam

- Archives sauvées des eaux

Archives sauvées des eaux – Exploitation des concepts No.1 (2000)
Version for plastic, Milan 2004. By Luc Ferrari and Erikm
Angle Records, Italie CD 0008 – 2004
Grand Prix 2005 Charles Cros in memoriam

- Son mémorisé

Presque Rien No.4 (1990–98)
Promenade symphonique dans un paysage musical ou Un jour de fête à El Oued en 1976 : (1976–78)
Saliceburry cocktail (2002)
Sub Rosa, SR252 – 2006

- Far-West news episodes 2 and 3

Far-West news episodes 2 (May 1999)
Far-West news episodes 3 (June 1999)
Blue Chopsticks BC16 CD September 2006

- Et tournent les sons

Et tournent les Sons dans la Garrigue – Réflexion sur l'écriture No.1 (1977)
Archives sauvées des eaux – Exploitation des concepts No.3 (2000)
By the Ensemble Laborintus and Erikm
Césaré 06/03/4/2/1 France septembre 2006. Distr. Metamkine

- Les ProtoRythmiques

Les ProtoRythmiques (2007)
EriKm (Luc Ferrari) and Thomas Lehn
Room40 RM417/ May 2007

- Didascalies

Rencontres fortuites (2003) for viola, piano and memorized sounds.
Didascalies (2004) for viola and piano
Tautologos III (1969)
By Vincent Royer and Jean-Philippe Collard-Neven
Luc Ferrari facing his tautology – 2 days before the end,
a film by Guy Marc Hinant and Dominique Lohlé
Sub Rosa SR261 luc ferrari "didascalies" / cd+ dvd / May 2007

- Sonopsys

Passage pour mimes (1959)
J'ai été coupé (1960–69)
Selbstportrait oder Peinture de sons ou bien Tonmalerei (1996–97)
Sonopsys 4 – Cahiers musique concrète/acousmatique. May 2007

- in OHM: The Early Gurus of Electronic Music / 1943 – 1980

Music Promenade (1969)
Ellipsis arts...... EA500-4 USA

- in Asia – Trio d'argent

Madame de Shanghaï (1996)
Michel Boizot / François Daudin Clavaud / Xavier Saint-Bonnet (Flutes)
Musique d'Aujourd'hui 9701 MDA M7 847 – 1997

- in An anthology of noise & electronic music / vol. #2

Visage V (1958–59)
Sub Rosa SR200 – 2003

- in Early modulations : vintage volts

Tête et queue du dragon (1959–60)
Caipirinha CP219 USA – 2000

- in Archives GRM – CD 2/5

Étude aux sons tendus (1958)
Étude floue (1958)
Étude aux accidents (1958)
Ina c 1032(2004) ADD – 750 – 276522

- Chantal, or the portrait of a villager (1977–78)

stereo tape.
in collaboration with Brunhild Meyer.
Digital on-line edition 2008
Room 40

- Archives Génétiquement Modifiées (2000) – mémorized sound
- Société II (1967)

for four soloists and sixteen instruments (flute, oboe, clarinet, bassoon, horn, trumpet, trombone, 4 violins, 2 violas, 2 violoncellos, 1 contrabass. Soloists: 1 piano, 3 percussions.) recording from 1968 by the EIMCP dir. Konstantin Simonovich.
Robot Records, USA

- À la recherche du rythme perdu

for piano and memorized sound. by Wilhem Latchoumia
In Wilhem Latchoumia – piano & electronic sounds
Sisyphe 013

- Madame de Shanghaï (1996)

for 3 flutes and memorized sound
In Manuel Zurria repeat !
Die Schachtel, Zeit C01

- Archives sauvées des eaux – Luc Ferrari with Otomo Yoshihide.

Bonus-track (CD extra) for the first 2000 copies : « Slow landing » Luc Ferrari with Otomo Yoshihide, Camera: Miyaoka Hideyuki and Nishihara Tazz Miyaoka
Disc Callithump CPCD-001

- Labyrinthe de violence

Danse
LP Alga Marghen
Disque vinyle PLANA-F alga027 – 2009

- Sexolidad (1982–83)
- Dialogue Ordinaire avec la Machine (1984)

Elica mpo-4301 – 2009

- INA-GRM Box (2009)

in partnership with La Muse en circuit,
contains 10 CD Luc Ferrari’s works for memorized sound as well as film music.

- Chantal (2009)

stereo tape (1977–78)
in collaboration with Brunhild Meyer.
Ohm/Avatar – ohm 051

- DIDASCALIES 2 ou Trois personnages en quête de notes (2005)

For two pianos and a third very strong instrument capable to uphold a very strong note.
Claude Berset and Jean-Philippe Collard-Neven, piano – Vincent Royer, viola
Recorded at La Chaux-de-Fonds, Switzerland
Vinyl disc Sub rosa SRV 305- April 2010

- TRANQUILLES IMPATIENCES (2010)

by Brunhild Ferrari recomposing tapes from Luc Ferrari called "Exercices d'Improvisation”
vinyle disc ALGA MARGHEN – 2010 – plana-MF alga028

- EPHÉMÈRE I & II (1974)

for tape and undetermined instrumentation
éphémère I – L'ordinateur ça sert à quoi ? Nov. 1974
éphémère II – Lyon 75 Nov. 1975
ALGA MARGHEN plana f. 33 NMN 081 – 2010

- EXERCICES D'IMPROVISATION (1977)

Suite of exercices (5 to 7 min. each) – can be individual or collective improvisation for any instrument or instrument group (maximum 8). They are intended for amateurs, professionals or students and may take place in concerts.
By Gol and Brunhild Ferrari
Vinyl disc ALGA MARGHEN planam 5 (it) – 2010

- PIANO & PERCUSSION WORKS

Satoko Inoue piano & Toshiyuki Matsukura percussion
CONVERSATION INTIME (October 1987 – March 1988) 19:33

for piano and percussion

VISAGE I (1956) 7:21 for piano
SONATINE ELYB POUR PIANO (1953–54) – 7 :44 for piano
CELLULE 75 – FORCE DU RYTHME ET CADENCE FORCEE (May – November 1975) 32:45
for piano, percussions and tape
Recorded in 2004 – Hat(now)ART 165 – Jan. 2011 – harmonia mundi

- LUC FERRARI " Madame de Shanghai " – " Après Presque Rien " – " Visage 2 "

VISAGE 2 (1955–56) – 10'02
APRES PRESQUE RIEN (2004) – 31'47 (commissioned by Art Zoyd, Musiques Nouvelles and CCMIX)
MADAME DE SHANGHAI (1996) – 15'22
By the Scottish Flute Trio and Ensemble Musiques Nouvelles, cond. Jean-Paul Dessy
Mode 228 – Feb. 2011

- VISITATION (1 avril 2011) – 25'23

eRikm & Luc Ferrari – The night bird, Cap 15 and night bird, Tuchan, in Presque Rien N0 2
Vinyle disc Alga Marghen Planam 18 (it) – 2011

- Souvenir, Souvenir

SUITE (1952)
SUITE HÉTÉROCLITE
SONATINE ELYB
VISAGE I
COLLECTION DE PETITES PIÈCES OU 36 ENFILADES POUR PIANO ET MAGNÉTOPHONE
piano : Elmar Schrammel – WERGO 67372

- JETZT ou PROBABLEMENT MON QUOTIDIEN IL EST LA, DANS LA CONFUSION DES LIEUX ET DES MOMENTS – Hörspiel 1982 – 1 h. 45'

Radio composition for Hessischer Rundfunk. .

Ferrari (r)écouté
new compositions with sound material of Ferrari's JETZT tapes from:
Tiziana Bertoncini – Antje Vowinckel – Frank Niehusmann – David Fenech – Neele Hülcker

COMPOSER LA RADIO – DAS RADIO KOMPONIEREN
excerpts from a radio conférence with Luc Ferrari (2000)
produced by ZKM, Karlsruhe and WERGO. – WERGO ZKM milestones 2066.2 – 2011

- PROGRAMME COMMUN Luc + Brunhild Ferrari

Double CD

Luc Ferrari:

MUSIQUE SOCIALISTE, or PROGRAMME COMMUN POUR CLAVECIN ET BANDE MAGNETIQUE – (1972)
harpsichord: Elisabeth Chojnacka

DIDASCALIES 2 – (2005)
for 2 pianos and a third very powerful instrument that can hold a very loud note : viola
Jean-Philippe Collard-Neven et Claude Berset : piano. Vincent Royer : viola

LES EMOIS D’APHRODITE – (1986) Version 1998
for clarinet, piano, percussion, 2 samplers and memorized sound
by the ensemble MC BAND, dir. Mary Chun, San Francisco

Brunhild Ferrari – electroacoustic, with sounds from Luc Ferrari :

DERIVATIF – (2008)
BRUMES DU REVEIL – (2009)
TRANQUILLES IMPATIENCES – (2010)
Sub Rosa SR363 AB – www.SUBROSA.NET

- LUC FERRARI « PRESQUE RIEN »

double vinyl discs
PRESQUE RIEN No.1
PRESQUE RIEN No. 2
PRESQUE RIEN AVEC FILLES
PRESQUE RIEN No. 4 – La remontée du Village
Recollectio GRM 2012 – REGRM 005 et éditions MEGO – INA GRM

- L. FERRARI

UND SO WEITER for electric piano and tape
Gérard Frémy, Piano
MUSIC PROMENADE original mix
re-issue of the vinyl disc by WERGO from 1969 – WER 67752 – 2012

== CD and DVD releases ==
- Didascalies

Rencontres Fortuites (2003) pour alto, piano et SM.
Didascalies (2004) pour alto et piano
Tautologos 3 (1969)
by Vincent Royer, viola and Jean-Philippe Collard-Neven, piano
+ DVD
Luc Ferrari face à sa tautologie – 2 jours avant la fin
Film by Guy-Marc Hinant and Dominique Lohlé
French version, with English sub-titles, recorded while the rehearsal of Tautologos III.
"that would be Luc’s last one in this beginning of July 2005.
Sub Rosa SR261 luc ferrari "didascalies" / cd+ dvd / mai 2007

This Box was rewarded with the « Coup de Coeur Charles Cros – musique contemporaine printemps 2008 » and the Grand Prix from the festival "Filmer à tout prix", Brussels in 2008

- Presque rien avec Luc Ferrari

Film by Jacqueline Caux and Olivier Pascal – with Elise Caron – eRikm – Christof Schläger . 2004.
ELICA VPO-4290
Robot Records 2008
Forced Exposure; Métamkine, Fr.; Die Schachtel, It.; Mimaroglu Music Sales; Die Stadt, Germ.; A-Musik, Cologne, Germ.; Empreintes Digitales, Montreal Can.; Disk Union, Tokyo, Jap.

- Les Archives sauvées des Eaux

Luc Ferrari with Otomo Yoshihide.
« Slow Landing » Luc Ferrari with Otomo Yoshihide, Camera: Miyaoka Hideyuki and Nishihara Tazz Miyaoka
Disc Callithump CPCD-001

== Recent book releases ==
- Collective book, edited by Brunhild Ferrari : Luc Ferrari complete works, London May 2019, 457 p. (ISBN 9781787601536). Published par Ecstatic peace library (UK).
- Presque Rien avec Luc Ferrari

book by Jacqueline Caux. Discussion with Luc Ferrari.
Editions Main d’œuvre, Nice – January 2001

translation into Japanese by Ryosuke Shiina (Tokyo, 2006)
Luc Ferrari to hotondo nanimo nai.
Editions Gendaishichô-shinsha (2006), Tokyo, Japan.

translation into English by Jérôme Hansen.
Almost Nothing with Luc Ferrari. Editions Errant Bodies (2013)

- Sonopsys No. 4 Luc Ferrari

Cahiers Musique Concrète / Acousmatique, published by Licences (French – English) – 2007
by Alexandre Yterce and Florence Gonot

- Luc Ferrari Portraits Polychromes

supplemented edition by GRM / INA – 2007 – grm@ina.fr

- The Politics of Presque Rien by Eric Drott

in Sound Commitments (Oxford University Press, 2009).
P. 145-166. Pdf to download on the website on “bibliography” 2009 page 9

- Luc Ferrari in: In the Blink of an Ear:

Toward a Non-Cochlear Sonic Art
by Seth Kim- Cohen. (Continuum, 2009). "Sound-Out-Of-Itself" p. 175-185.
Pdf to download on the website on “bibliography” 2009 page 9

- Luc Ferrari in : Silence, les couleurs du prisme & la mécanique du temps qui passe. Les Presque Rien – Et Tournent les sons Dans la Garrique by Daniel Caux

Editions de l’Eclat, Paris. Pages 333–337 (2009)

- Syntone News and Critique of the Radio-Art

the Radio of Luc (and his listeners)
Chantal Dumas – François Parra – Irvic Oliver – José Iges – Götz Naleppa – Lucien Bertolina.
Contributions collected and conducted by Etienne Noiseau. Edited by Etienne Noiseau

- The Bells Angels No. 2

Magazine TBA No 2 July 2010-07-03 containing the score of
Monologos (for solo voice and électroacoustic device) – 1970 – as well as
Concepts (3 excerpts of Jacqueline Caux’ book: Presque Rien avec Luc Ferrari
éditions nuitdencre galerie 64 rue jean-pierre timbaud – 75011 paris

- The Bells Angels

Magazine TBA No 3 – 2011
10 photoengraving-works by Luc Ferrari

== Bibliography ==
1959 Luc Ferrari: "Stages of the Vision/Stages of the Production" in Expériences musicales – Concrete music – exotic Electronics Revue Musicale No. 244, Paris 1959, p. 8 – 10

1967 "Luc Ferrari" by Pierre Schaeffer in La Musique Concrète Que Sais-Je. Presses Universitaires de France, Paris 1967, p. 108 – 113

1970 "Luc Ferrari". Interview by Denys Lémery. In Actuel No. 12, 1970, p. 14 – 18

1971 Luc Ferrari – "Für Wen Komponieren Sie Eigentlich?" (For whom do you actually compose?) By Hansjörg Pauli Ed. S. Fischer – Frankfurt 1971, p. 37 – 59

1972 "Discussion with Luc Ferrari" by François-Bernard Mâche. In Nouvelle Revue Française No. 232, 1972

1973 "Luc Ferrari Les Danses Organiques". Remarks collected by Daniel Caux in Art Vivant – Le Corps (The body) 2, No. 41, July 1973, p. 30 – 32

1974 Tibor Kneif: "Types of the « Entsprachlichung" » in The New Music 1 Stephan, Rudolf (ed.): "About music and language. Seven Attempts about the Newer Vocal Music" Mainz (Schottt) 1974, pp. 30–31

1974 Luc Ferrari. "Interrupteur, Tautologos 3, Ensemble Instrumental de Musique Contemporaine de Paris, Konstantin Simonovitch". By Klaus Stahmer. In Melos Heft IV, July–August 1974, p. 242 – 244

1975 "Allo, Ici la Terre..." (Hello, the Earth is speaking) by Luc Ferrari. In Art Vivant – La Mort, (The Death) No. 54, January 1975, p. 22 – 23

1977 Luc Ferrari – "Für Wen Komponieren Sie Eigentlich?" (For whom do you actually compose?) By Hansjörg Pauli Reproduction in Beiträge zur Musikwissenschaft, Heft 4, 1977, p. 260 – 269

1977 "Luc Ferrari". Discussion with David Jisse. In Unison No. 3 Paris, May 1977, p. 14 – 16

1977 Reflections by Luc Ferrari on "Does the Music of Future Have a Future?". In Cahiers Recherche/Musique, INA-GRM, 1977, p. 77 – 79

1978 François-Bernard Mâche: LES MAL ENTENDUS. Composers of the 70s In Revue musicale No. 314, 1978, p. 65 – 69

1978 "Srefacia a... y Reflexion Sobre... por Luc Ferrari" – UN PUEBLO NUMERO 11350 por Luc Ferrari In Arte Nuevo 1, Universidad Veracruzana 1978, p. 10 – 13

1979 Luc Ferrari "Erudite Cultures and Popular Cultures". Interview by Catherine Millet In Art Press International, No. 26, March 1979, p. 18

1981 Luc Ferrari – dossier "En attendant Enée". In Cahier de l'animation musicale, No. 19, June 1981, p. 11 – 12

1981 "Discussion with Luc Ferrari". Remarks collected by Francis Hofstein. Jazz Magazine – 1981, p. 26 – 29

1981 "Discussion with Luc Ferrari" by Denis Levaillant In L'Improvisation Musicale, Editions J.C. Lattès 1981, p. 4 – 7

1983 Luc Ferrari "The Music is also Word. Journal Intime." Interview by Michel Giroud. In Canal, No. 54, November 1983, p. 19

1983 Luc Ferrari. "Société 1" text-score. In Chemin de Ronde, Vol. 3, 1983,

1985 Luc Ferrari. "About the pleasure of the desire – Histoire du Plaisir et de la Désolation". By Klaus HiNoich Stahmer. In Melos, No. 4, 1985, p. 19 – 33

1986 Luc Ferrari. "Moderato ma non troppo" by P. Minod. In Restons Simples (Creativ Media), No. 2, January 1986, p. 68 – 69

1989 "Hörspiel – Création radiophonique – Radio Art Je Me Suis Perdu – Abyrinthe Portrait from Luc Ferrari" by Michel Dumont. In Magazine Kanal, No. 42, April 1989, p. 60 – 61

1990 "Luc Ferrari". Interview by Stephane Ollivier. In Revue et Corrigée, No. 5, Spring 1990, p. 4 – 7

1990 "Composesrs and Rhetoric". Discussion between François Delalande and Luc Ferrari In 20 Analyse Musicale, Paris June 1990, p. 47 – 49

1993 "Ça Frotte" (It brushes) by Luc Ferrari. In L'Evidence, No. 2, Autumn 1993, p. 24 – 27

1993 "Analyse – Journal" (Analysis Diary) by Luc Ferrari. In Musiques d'Aujourd'hui Conseil Général de la Creuse – December 1993, p. 69 – 77

1995 "Luc Ferrari Presque Rien". By Jérôme Noetinger. In Revue et Corrigé, No. 26, December 1995, p. 35

1996 "Discussion with Luc Ferrari". Ch. Zanesi In Ars Sonora, No. 3, March 1996, p. 7 – 15

1996 "Discussion with Luc Ferrari". By Danielle Cohen-Levinas. In La Règle du Jeu – 1996

1996 Luc Ferrari in: "Recherches sur la Transformation du Temps Musical sous L’Angle de la Philosophie Japonaise" (Research on the transformation of musical time under the angle of Japanese philosophy). by Ryôsuke SHIINA, Université de Lille III, 9, rue Auguste Angellier, 59046 Lille Cedex

1996 "Je Courais tan de Buts Divers..." (I was running in so many different directions...). Contemporary music review Vol. 15. G+B Arts International, London, p. 95 – 104

1997 Sandeep Bhagwati: "Two French Composers" (Georges Aperghis and Luc Ferrari) In Jahrbuch der Bayrischen Akademie der Schönen Künste 11. 1997, p. 391 – 399

1997 Luc Ferrari in "The Art of the Fixed Sounds", by Jean-Noël von der Weid, In La musique du XXe siècle Editions Hachette (Pluriel), p. 221 – 223

1997 "Luc Ferrari". Interview by Haruyuki Suzuki. In Eigageijutsu, No. 383, Japan 1997

1998 "Minimal or Not Luc Ferrari". Interview by Karen Tanaka In Musée – a shape of miles – Tower records – Vol. 12, Japan, March 1998, p. 14

1998 Luc Ferrari in: "Aspects de la Notation Verbale Essai de Taxinomie des Propositions Verbales des Années Soixante et Soixante-Dix. Mémoire du DEA" (Essay on taxonomy of the verbal proposals of the Sixties and seventies) Memory of the DEA by Radosveta Kouzmanova Bruzaud U.F.R. de Musique et Musicologie du XXe siècle – Université de Paris IV-Sorbonne, Oct.1998

1998 Luc Ferrari – "Interview with an Intimate Iconoclast" by Brigitte Robindoré In Computer Music Journal, Vol. 22, No. 3 – Autumn, p. 8 – 16

1999 Luc Ferrari. Remarks collected by Dan Warburton Peace Warriors No. 10 – January

1999 Luc Ferrari in: "La Notation Verbale au Service de Rituel" (the verbal notation with the service of the ritual) Colloquia Musique et Rites May 17–19, 1999 by Radosveta Bruzaud

1999 "Serial Deviant" by Dan Warburton. The Wire – April, p. 26 – 28

1999 Luc Ferrari "Far West News". In Soundscapes – VPRO Hilversum – NL, November 1999, p. 20 – 21

1999 "Lots of Luc Ferrari" by John Palmer In 20th Century Music, San Anselmo CA., USA, December, p. 3 – 10

1999 "Luc Ferrari's Art of Tautology Vous plairait-il de tautologuer avec moi?" (Would you like to tautologize with me?) Interview by Jacqueline Caux – French / English In Art Press International, No. 252 – December 1999, p. 49 – 52

2000 Luc Ferrari in conversation with J. Palmer In SAN Journal of Electroacoustic Music, London, p. 36 – 44

2000 Luc Ferrari. "About the publication of the CD: Chansons pour le Corps et si Tout Entière Maintenant" by Ryosuke Shiina. In Musée – sacrifice fly – Tower records – Vol. 23, Japan, January, p. 93 – 107

2000 11. Karl-Sczuka-Preis 1972, p. 99–101 PORTRAITSPIEL 27. Karl-Sczuka-Preis 1988, p. 184–190 VERIRRT. EIN LABYRINTH In Akustische Spielformen SWR SchrifteNoeihe « Grundlagen 1 » Spring 2000

2000 Luc Ferrari in: LE CONCERT ENJEUX, FONCTIONS, MODALITÉS JEU DE SOCIÉTÉ OU LA THEATRALISATION DU CONCERT (Stakes, functions, methods parlour game or the THEATRALISATION in the concert by Radosveta Bruzaud Harmattan – Logique Sociale, p. 137 – 174

2000 Luc Ferrari. Remarks collected by Ryosuke Shiina In Poetry and Criticism: Eureka 5 / 2000, p. 39 – 51

2001 Luc Ferrari. Portraits Polychromes. Co-Edition Cdmc, Ina Groupe Edition-Documentation 2001-06-13

2001 Luc Ferrari in "Die Kunst der Fixierten Klänge" (The art of the fixed sounds) by Jean-Noël von der Weid, In Die Musik des 20. Jahrhunderts Insel-Verlag, Leipzig, p. 332 – 335

2002 Presque Rien avec Luc Ferrari (Almost nothing with Luc Ferrari) 260 pages with photographs. Author: Jacqueline Caux. Discussions with Jacqueline Caux Publication January 2001 Editions Main d’Oeuvre, Nice Tel./Fax 04 93 92 42 49

2002 "Luc Ferrari, or Memory as Non-Music" par Ryosuke Shiina In Bulletin of Institute for Interdisciplinary Studies of Culture Vol.19 Doshisha Women’s College, Japan, March 31/2, 002

2002 "Cinéma pour les oreilles about Almost Nothing with Luc Ferrari" by Jacqueline Caux In Les INoockuptibles 14 to 20 August 2002 No. 351, p. 58 – 59

2003 T. Möller: Luc Ferrari, in Komponisten der Gegenwart, (composers of the present) 26. Subsequent edition 12/03.

2003 Luc Ferrari: "Impro-Micro-Acoustique" by Noël Akchoté in Skug No. 57– Austria, p. 49

2004 Luc Ferrari in: "Le Mot dans la Partition au Vingtième Siècle" (The Word in the Score at the Twentieth Century) Thesis of Doctorate of Music and Musicology of the 20th century by Radosveta Kouzmanova Bruzaud U.F.R. de Musique et Musicologie – Université de Paris IV – Sorbonne, December. 2004

2004 "La Musique et Son Dehors – Re la Musique Anecdotique à L’Arythmie (Music and its outside – Anecdotic Music with the Arrhythmia) by David Sanson et Pierre Yves Macé. In Mouvement No. 30, p. 48–59

2004 Luc Ferrari interviews by Dan Warburton "Invisible Jukebox". In The Wire No. 242 April 2004, p. 20–23

2005 "L'Escalier des Aveugles a Hörspiel" from Luc Ferrari (The staircase of the blinds). By Andrea Cohen in Les compositeurs et l'art radiophonique (The composers and the radiophonic art) thesis of Doctorate. Sorbonne-Paris IV 2005

2005 "L’Eloge de l’Arythmie. Le Hasard avec Détermination". (The Praise of the Arrhythmia The chance with determination. For his 75th birthday... By David Sanson et Pierre Yves Macé In Mouvement Musique Action, Cahier Spécial, 18–29 May 2005, p. 10–12

2005 Luc Ferrari "Cycles des Souvenirs – Exploitation des Concepts" (Cycle of memories – Exploitation of the Concepts). From the "Diary in disorder or the pursuit of the daily life sounds". In Temporale Edizioni Studio Dabbeni – Lugano – No. 60-61 – 2005 "Joueurs Aspendiens" a cura di Gabiele Bonomo, p. 56–60

2005 Page of the score "Tautologies et Environs" – Exploitation Des Concepts No. 4. 2000–2001 in Sound Visions p. 91, Pfau-Verlag, Saarbrücken, Editors Möller/Shim/Stäbler.

2005 Möller, Torsten: Please, Just Go Your Way... – Luc Ferrari died in the Italian Arrezzo at the age of 76 years In: NZfM 6., p. 42–43

2005 Möller, Torsten: Zum Tod Von Luc Ferrari, (Luc Ferrari died) in: Dissonanz/Dissonance 92 (December 2005), p. 43

2005 Luc Ferrari in MusikTexte Heft 107, November 2005 « Always Unconventional» Remembering Luc – Peter-michael Hamel. « The Composer, Radio Play and Film Producer Luc Ferrari » Tatjana Böhme-mehner. « An Alternative to the Opera. Luc Ferrari About Music Theater » – Jacqueline Caux. « Sounds, Sounds… The Pieces of Almost Nothing» From Luc Ferrari – Daniel Teruggi. « The Drama of Even the Life». Luc Ferrari’s « Cellule 75 » – Monika Lichtenfeld. « What Would Be, If? Stravinsky Meets Beethoven In Luc Ferrari’s Studio» – Klaus Mehner. « The True Or Untrue Story Of Cahier Du Soir» (1991–1992) » – Luc Ferrari. « Each Time… », « The City Of The Future», Autobiographies From Luc Ferrari. In memory of Luc Ferrari. « “Committed observer of the reality, Luc Ferrari » – Daniel Caux.

2005 Luc Ferrari in: La musique du XXe siècle. – Jean Noël von der Weid. Hachette. ISBN 2-01-235948-5. 2005. P. 359-363

2005 "The Lesson of Freedom – Remembering Luc Ferrari (1929–2005)" By John Palmer – Guilherme Vaz – Hildegard Westerkamp In Soundscape Vol. 6 No. 1

2006 K.T. Goldbach: "Akusmatisches und ökologisches Hören in Luc Ferraris Presque rien avec filles", (acousmatic and ecologic listening in Luc Ferrari’s Presque rien avec filles) in: Zeitschrift der GMTH 3, H. 1

2006 Böhme-Mehner, Tatjana: "He Always Composed... Until Himself. The Computer, Electroacoustician, and Film Producer Luc Ferrari". In: Dissonanz/Dissonance 93 (March 2006), p. 4–9

2006 Random Notes – Luc Ferrari 1929–2005 by David Cotner in SIGNAL TO NOISE Winter 2006 issue #40 operations@signaltonoisemagazine.com

2006 Salut Luc By Carole Rieussec, David Grubbs, Alessandro Bosetti, Li Ping Ting, Jean-Christophe Camps, Jérôme Noetinger, Chantal Dumas, eRikm, Jean-Baptiste Favory In revue & corrigée No. 67, March 2006

2006 Almost Nothing with Luc Ferrari Book by Jacqueline Caux. Discussions with Jacqueline Caux Published in January 2001 Editions Main d’Oeuvre, Nice Tel./Fax 04 93 92 42 49 Published in Japanese by Ryosuke Shiina, Tokyo, March 2006

2007 Sonopsys No. 4 Luc Ferrari Cahier Musique Concrète / Acousmatique by Florence Gonot and Alexandre Yterce, Edition LICENCES. Publication at the moment of the premiere of Morbido Symphonie in Paris on 11 May 2007. Art-book with CD.

2007 Luc Ferrari – Portraits Polychromes, Published by INA/GRM, Collection directed by Evelyne Gayou. New increased edition

2007 Almost Nothing with Luc Ferrari By Toshiharu Osato in "nobody", critic film-, music-, literature-review Published May–June 2007 No. 25, Japan. Pages 47–57:
