= Vincent Royer =

French violist and composer (born 1961)

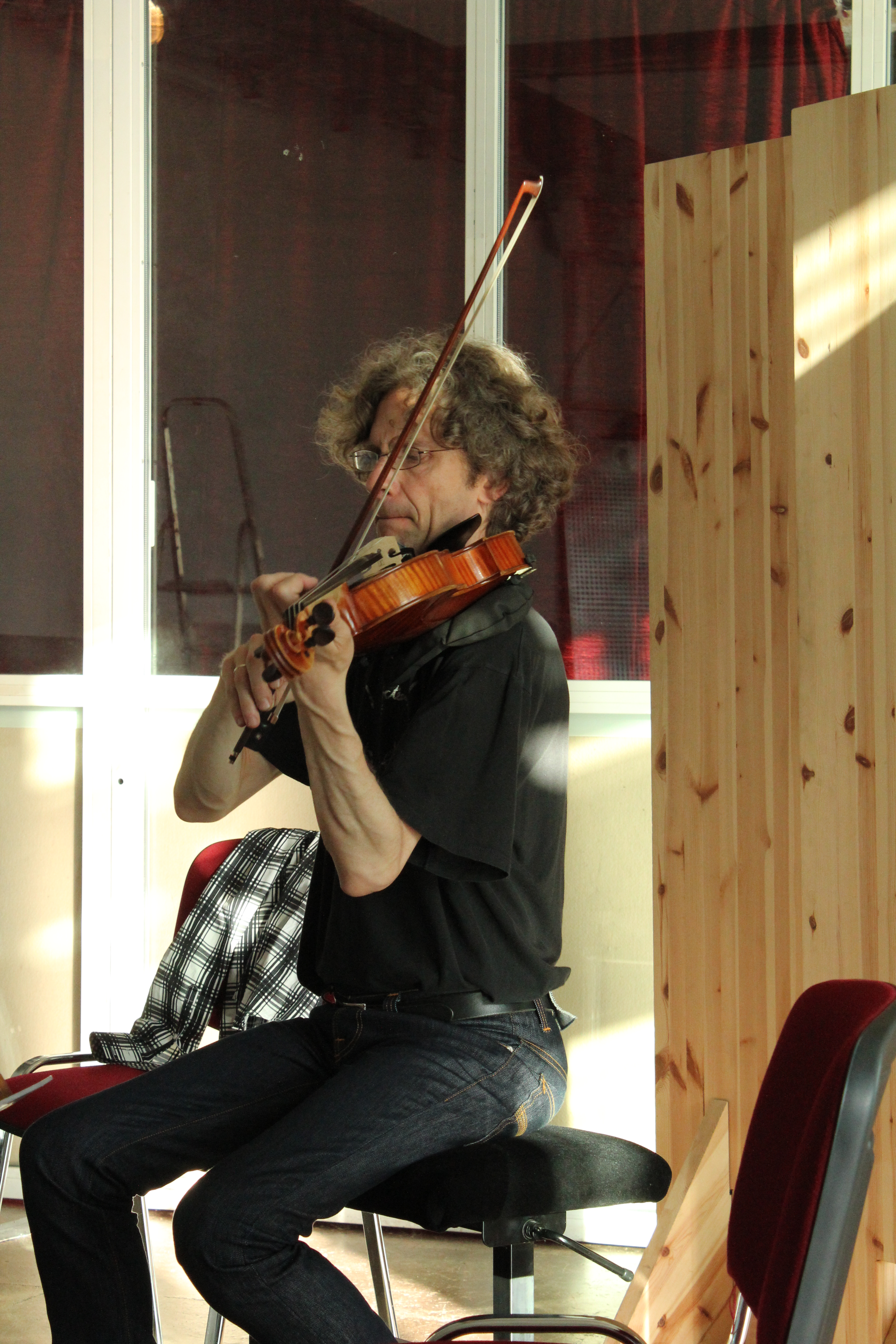
Vincent Royer bei einem Konzert mit dem Scott Fields Feartet im Loft (Köln), 2012

Vincent Royer (born 22 January 1961) is a French violist and composer.

He gives concerts worldwide as a soloist and chamber musician. He gives master classes, is a member of various ensembles and teaches as professor for chamber music at the Royal Conservatory of Liège.

== Life ==
Born in Strasbourg, Royer first studied piano with the concert pianist and Schumann interpreter Hélène Boschi. At the age of 13 he switched to the viola and received lessons from Claude Ducroqc.

As a scholarship holder of the Ministry of Culture in Paris, he passed the State Music Teacher Examination in 1987 and received his degree in the main subject viola at the Hochschule für Musik Freiburg. He obtained his diploma in 1989 at the Hochschule für Musik und Tanz Köln, also majoring in viola. He studied with Ulrich Koch in Freiburg, Rainer Moog in Cologne and Serge Collot in Paris.

After his studies he founded together with the Brazilian pianist Paulo Álvares the group ALEA - an ensemble for collective musical composition and Improvisation.

In 1991 he was awarded the 'Prix Xenakis de Paris' as part of the 'Lucero Festivals'.

In 1995 he received a scholarship from the French Ministry of Culture as Artist in Residence at the Bourse Lavoisier artist and residence at the 'Banff Centre for the Arts' in Canada.

From 1995 to 2009 Royer gave master class at the 'Académie d’été de Jeunesses Musicales de Croatie' in Grožnjan. From 2003 to 2009 he taught at the Conservatoire royal de Mons and at the Royal Conservatory of Liège. In 2009 Royer made the first recording of Horațiu Rădulescu's complete works for viola. The professional journal Crescendo awarded the recording with the highest rating.

From 2007 to 2009 Royer taught in workshops at universities in Chicago, Los Angeles (California Institute of the Arts and University of California, Santa Barbara) and Brüssel.

In 2008 Royer won the Coup de Cœur of the Académie Charles Cros. The prize is awarded by the Académie Charles Cros. It is regarded as the French equivalent of the US-American NARAS, which awards the Grammy Awards annually. The award went to two recordings, the CD Didascalies with works by the composer Luc Ferrari released in 2007 and the CD Lignes with chamber music works by Jean-Luc Fafchamps.

Didascalies, which was made together with the Belgian pianist Jean-Philippe Collard-Neven, is considered by experts to be a reference for Ferrari's music. The recordings were also highly acclaimed in the specialist press. Thus the French music magazine Le Monde de la musique awarded the highest mark for Lignes.

Three years later he received the Coup de Cœur again. This time for the album Giacinto Scelsi Volume 9: The Works for Viola, which includes works for viola and voice by the Italian composer and poet Giacinto Scelsi from 1955 to 1964.

In 2010 he gave together with Alex Waterman a master class for the American Federation of Composers at the International House Philadelphia.

Since 2010 Royer is also professor for chamber music at the Conservatoire Royal de Liège in Belgium.

In 2013 he gave further master classes at the Hochschule für Musik und Tanz Köln, in 2014 at the Musik-Akademie der Stadt Basel, in 2015 at the Viola Moderna Festival at the Folkwang Universität and the same year at the Conservatoire de musique du Québec à Montréal.

== Compositions ==
In his compositions the moment of sound research plays a central role. "Traverse" was honoured in 2000 by the "International Computer Music Conference" in Berlin, and "Lumen" (2003) for viola and electronics was created in 2003 at the "Centre Henri Pousseur" in Liège, with which Royer has been associated since 2001.

Together with the computer scientist and composer Gerhard Eckel, he developed improvisations for viola with electronics and a viola sound catalogue in Banff and the ZKM (Karlsruhe).

=== Works ===
- Catalogue des sons, Chinook (1995), premiere
- Chinook II for strings and band (1996), premiere
- la rivière du silence (2001), premiere
- Lumen für alto & Elektronik (2003), premiere
- Dix ailes for cello, harp, percussion (2004), premiere
- l’Amour fou for ensemble and tape (2009), premiere
- Préludes à l'Amour fou for mezzo, viola and piano (2011), premiere
- Akasha for viola ensemble (2014), premiere

== Chamber music ==
From 2011 to 2014 he was a member of the Scott Fields String Feartet. His current formations in the field of improvisation are the Brac Quartet, the Gratkowski-Royer duo and a duo with the architect and video artist Matthias Siegert.

== Ensembles ==
Royer was co-founder of the ALEA Ensemble in 1989 and solo viola player in the Cologne ensemble from 1989 to 1992. He has been a member of the Gürzenich Orchestra Cologne since 1990 and of the European Lucero Ensemble since 1991. He is also a regular guest with the Ensemble Modern, the Ensemble Musikfabrik and the Ensemble Noamnesia in Chicago.

== Discography ==
- Éphémère... (CD) Luc Ferrari, Brunhild Ferrari, Vincent Royer (2015, Mode 285)
- Gentle Electronics (CD/DVD) Jean-Luc Fafchamps (2015, SubRosa 397)
- La chute du rouge (CD) Christophe Bertrand (2015, Motus 214008)
- Hall des chars (CD) BRAC Quartet (2014, blumlein records)
- String Feartet (CD) Scott Fields (2013, Between the lines)
- le parfum des cordes (CD) Marcel Cominotto (2013, Azur classical)
- Instants chavirés (CD) BRAC Quartet(2012, blumlein records)
- …Lignes… (CD) Jean-Luc Fafchamps (2011, Fuga Libra 537)
- Giacinto Scelsi - The Viola Works (CD) Vincent Royer & Séverine Ballon (2011, Mode 231)
- Frail Lumber (CD) Scott Fields (2010, NotTwo)
- Didascalies 2 (Vinyl LP) Luc Ferrari (2010, SubRosa SRV305)
- Moersbow / Ozzo (CD) Scott Fields & Multiple Joyce Orchestra (2011, Clean Feed Records CF236CD)
- The Viola Works (CD) Giacinto Scelsi (2008, Mode 231)
- Didascalies (CD/DVD) Luc Ferrari (2007, SubRosa 261)
- Horatiu Radulescu: Intimate Rituals (CD) Vincent Royer & Gérard Caussé (Complete works for viola) (2006, SubRosa 248)
- The Book of Scenes (CD) David Shea (2005, SubRosa 224)
- Le Marteau sans maître (CD) Pierre Boulez (2001, CordAria)
- Fever / Ji-Virus (CD) Michael Riessler (2000, Wergo WER63092)
- Traverse (CD) Vincent Royer/Gerhard Eckel (1999, HDK Berlin)
- Das Lied von der Erde (CD) Gustav Mahler (1989, Canterino CNT 1031)

== Dedicated works ==
His solo activity as an interpreter is characterized by his personal collaboration with composers. The most important are Pascal Dusapin, Luc Ferrari, Gérard Grisey, Victor Kissine, Jean-Luc Fafchamps, Claude Ledoux, Horațiu Rădulescu, Michael Riessler, Vinko Globokar, Fabrizio Cassol, David Shea, Robert HP Platz, Frederic D'Haene, Christophe Bertrand and Ken Ueno.

As a result of this collaboration, various works were dedicated to Royer.

- Malika Kishino: Monochromer Garten VI (2015)
- Christophe Bertrand: Arashi (2007)
- Vinko Globokar: Métamorphoses paralèlles (2005)
- David Shea: The Book of Scenes (2005)
- Fabrizio Cassol: Anima Libera (2004)
- Robert Platz: Leere Mitte (2004)
- Jean-Luc Fafchamps: Z1 (2003), Streetmusic (2009)
- Luc Ferrari: Rencontres fortuites (2003), Didascalie (2004), Tautologos 3 (2005)
- Horatiu Radulescu: Agnus Dei (1991) and Lux Animae (2000)
