= Hermann Voss (musician) =

German painter (born 1934)

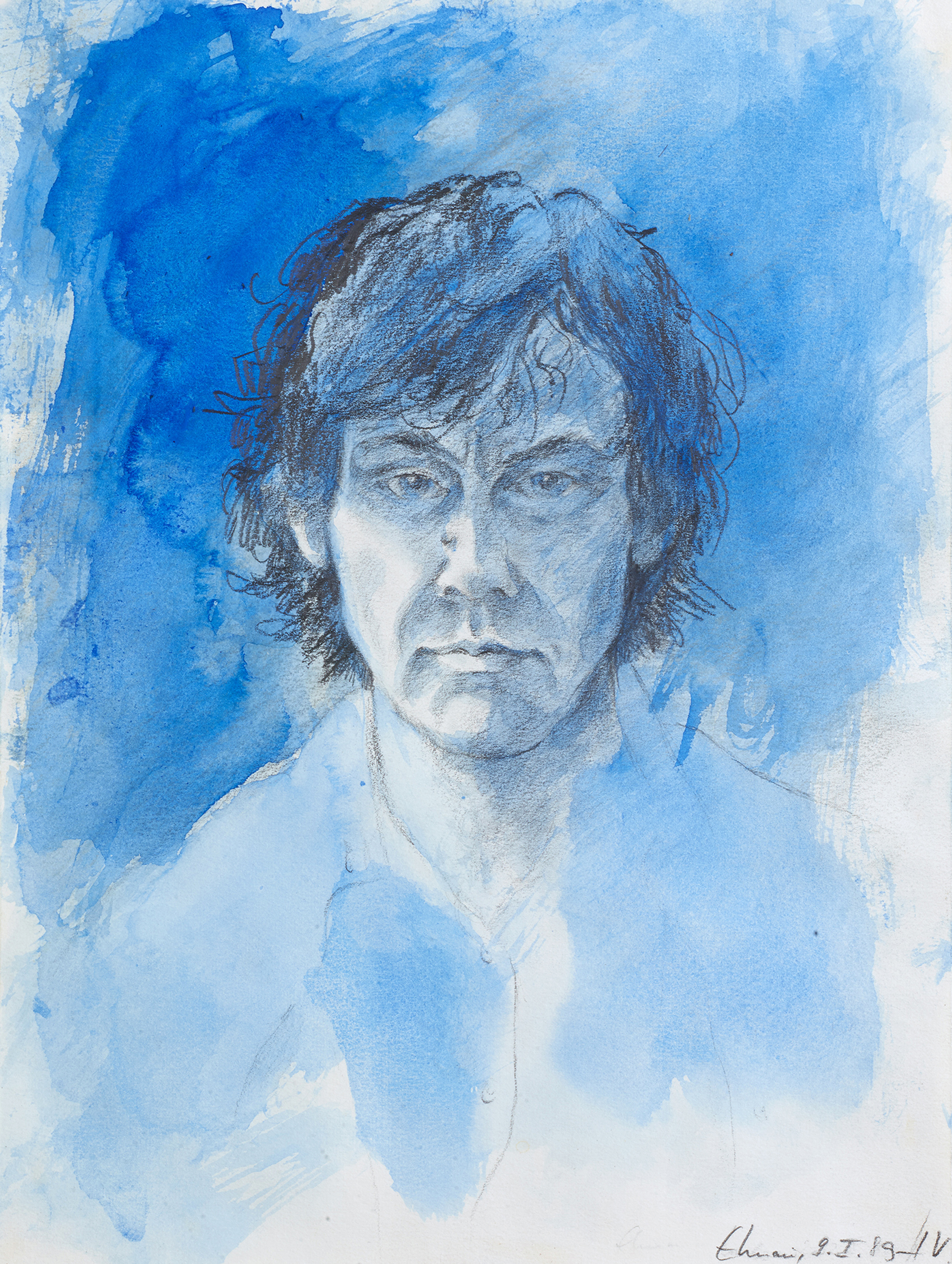
Voss self-portrait, 1989

Hermann Voss (born July 9, 1934) is a German violist, painter and marionettist. From 1975 to 2005, he taught viola and chamber music at the State University of Music and Performing Arts Stuttgart. Voss played the viola in the Melos Quartet for 40 years.

== Biography ==
=== Education and orchestral activity ===
Voss was born on July 9, 1934, in Brünen. He received his musical education at the Robert Schumann Hochschule at Düsseldorf and at the University of Music Freiburg with Sándor Végh and Ulrich Koch. After studying violin with Sándor Végh, he changed to viola under his new teacher Ulrich Koch. Shortly thereafter, he was awarded in 1959 in Stuttgart on the viola with the 1st Prize of the German University Competition. In 1959 and 1960, Herrmann Voss attended the summer courses of the cellist Pablo Casals at Zermatt. In 1966, he again became a prizewinner of the ARD International Music Competition at Munich on the viola. From 1960 to 1967, Voss was principal violist of the Stuttgarter Kammerorchester.

=== Melos quartet ===
In 1965, he was a founding member and until the dissolution in 2005 the only violist of the Melos Quartet.

=== Teaching ===
From 1975, Voss was a lecturer in string quartet playing and from 1980 to 2005 professor of viola and chamber music at the State University of Music and Performing Arts Stuttgart. In addition, he regularly took on lectures at music festivals with masterclasses in Ratzeburg, Oberstdorf and at international masterclasses in London, Sydney and Tokyo as well as at the Academy for string quartet interpretation of the Fondation Hindemith at Blonay.

=== Painting and puppet theater ===
In addition to his work as a musician, Voss also devotes himself to a creative work by making drawings, etchings, watercolor and acrylic paintings. With self-made puppet figures, masks and instruments, he regularly gives private and public performances in his own musical miniatures and pantomimes. By Voss elaborated and performed stage pieces are Festival kleiner Interpreten (Festival of small interpreters) and Bilder einer Vorstellung (Images of a performance).

== Gallery of own works ==
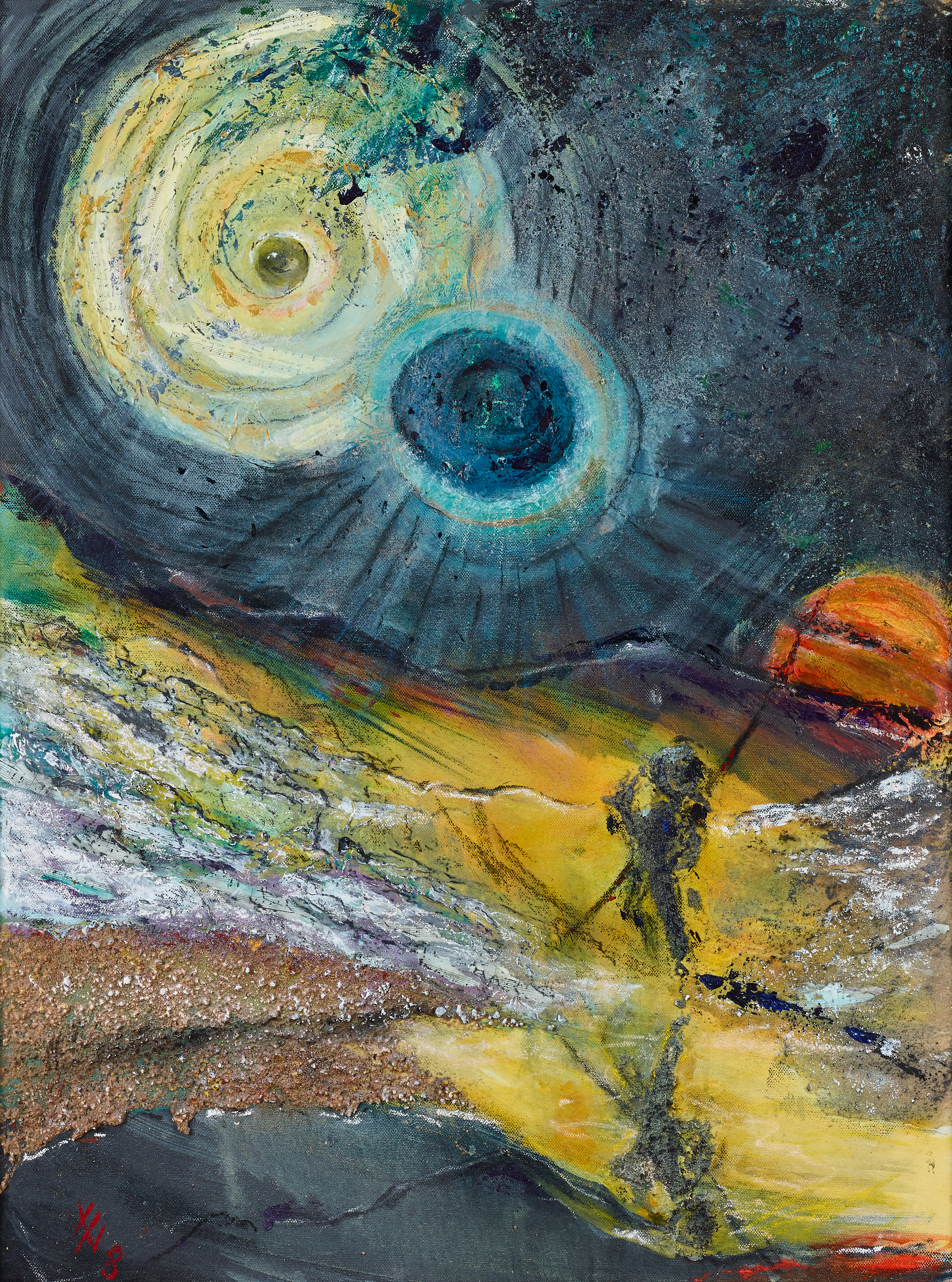
Drei Sonnen acrylic painting, 2008, 80x60 cm

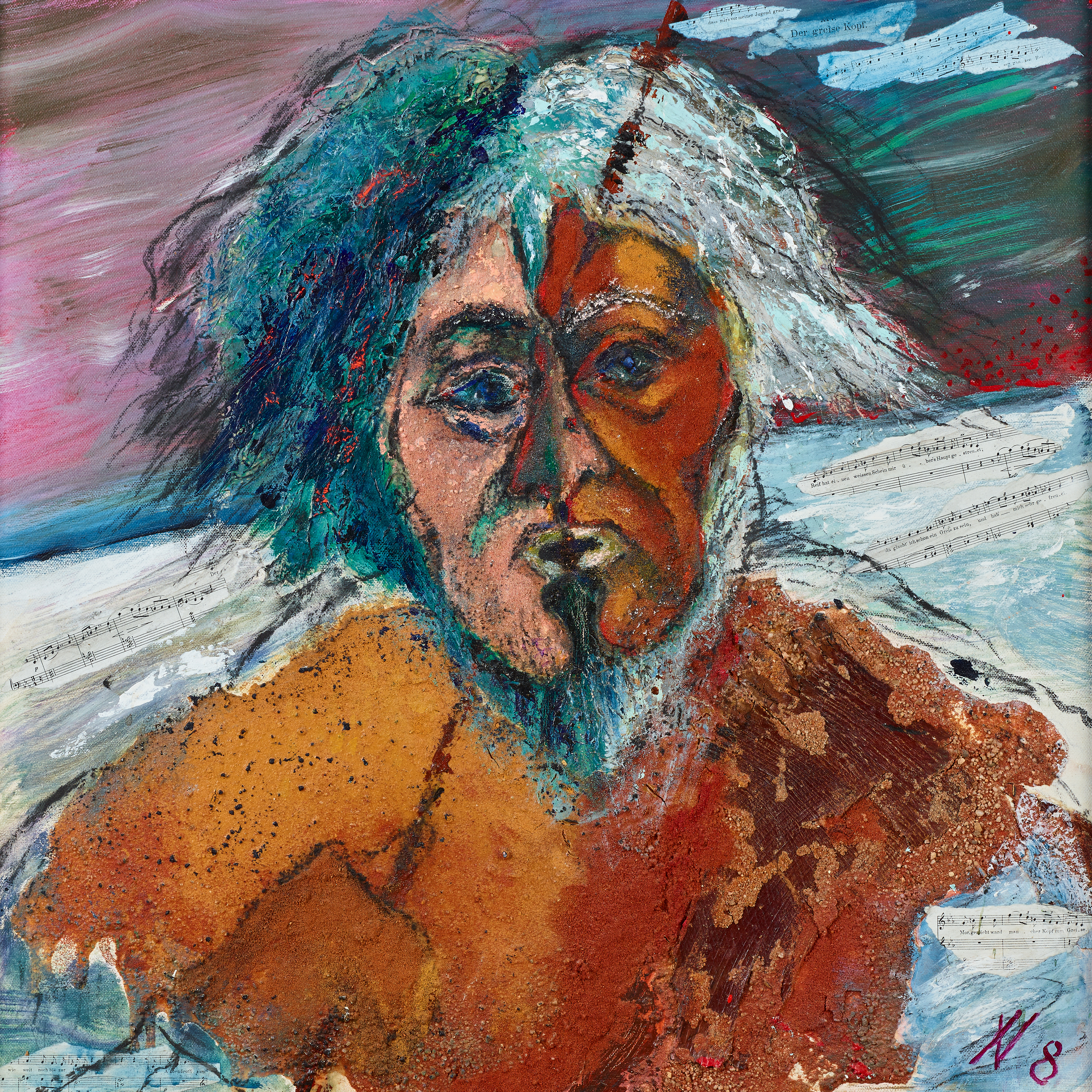
... dass ich eins und doppelt bin acrylic painting, 2008, 60x60 cm

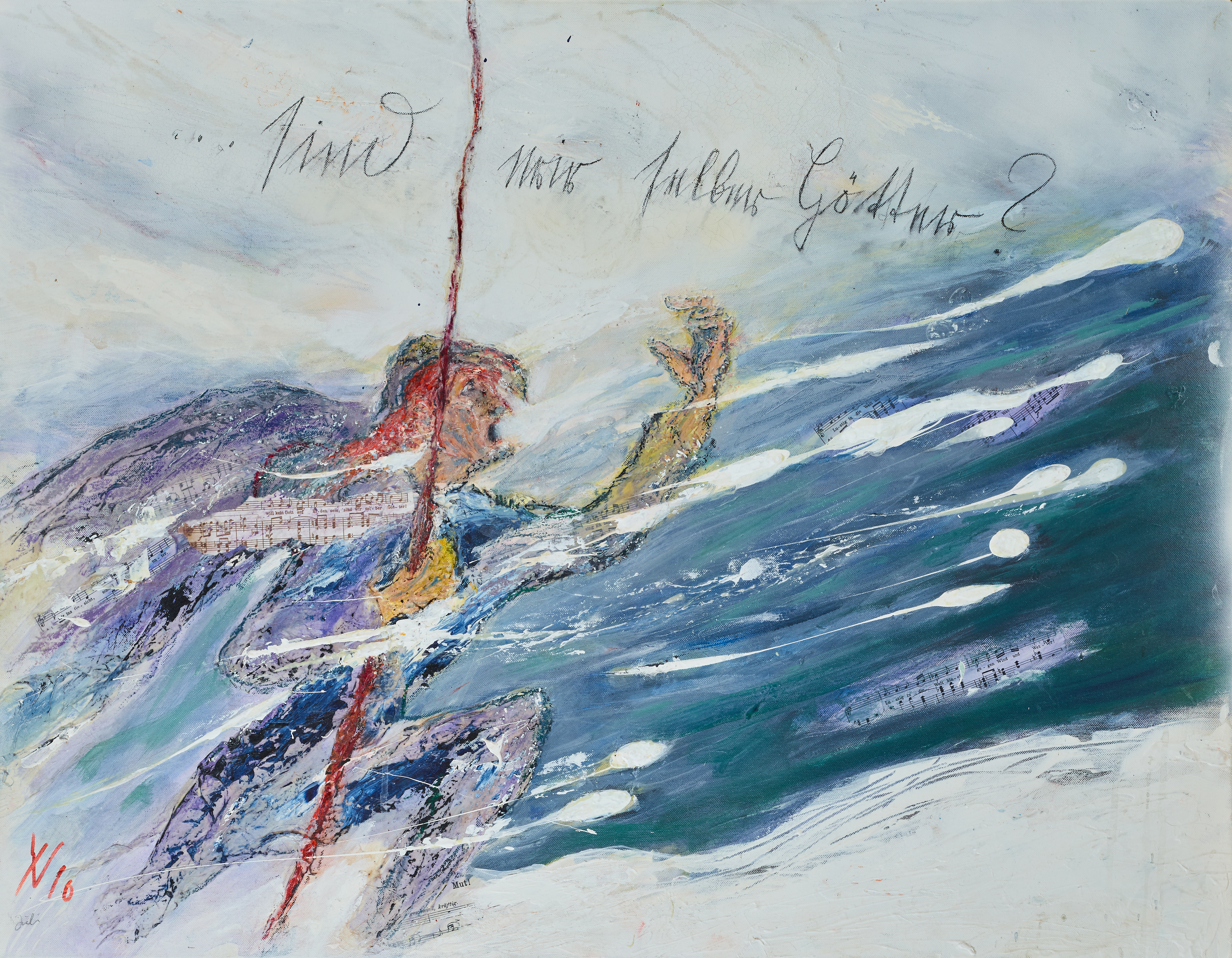
Sind wir selber Götter? acrylic painting, 2010, 70x90 cm

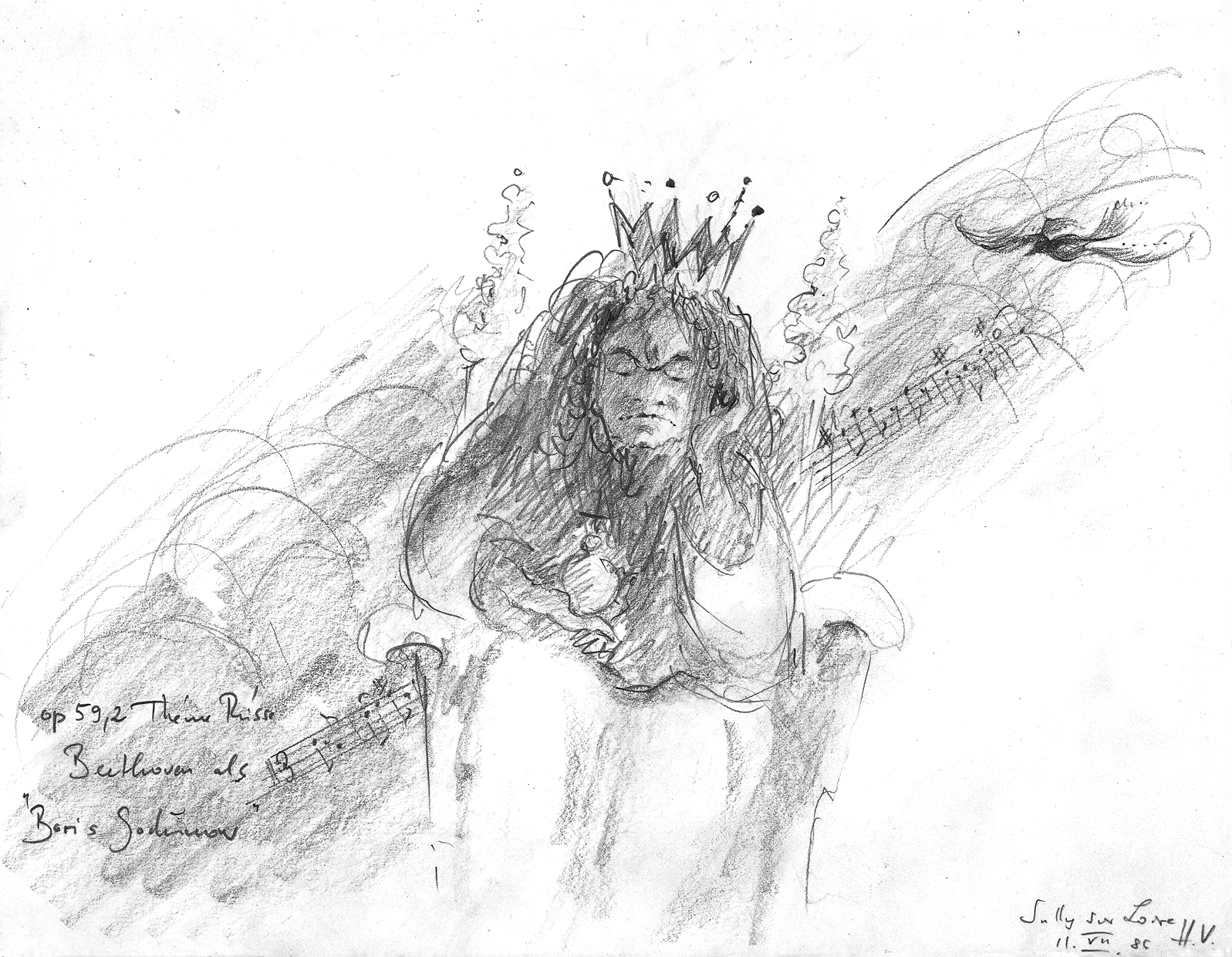
Thème russe - Beethoven als Boris Godunow pencil drawing, 1986

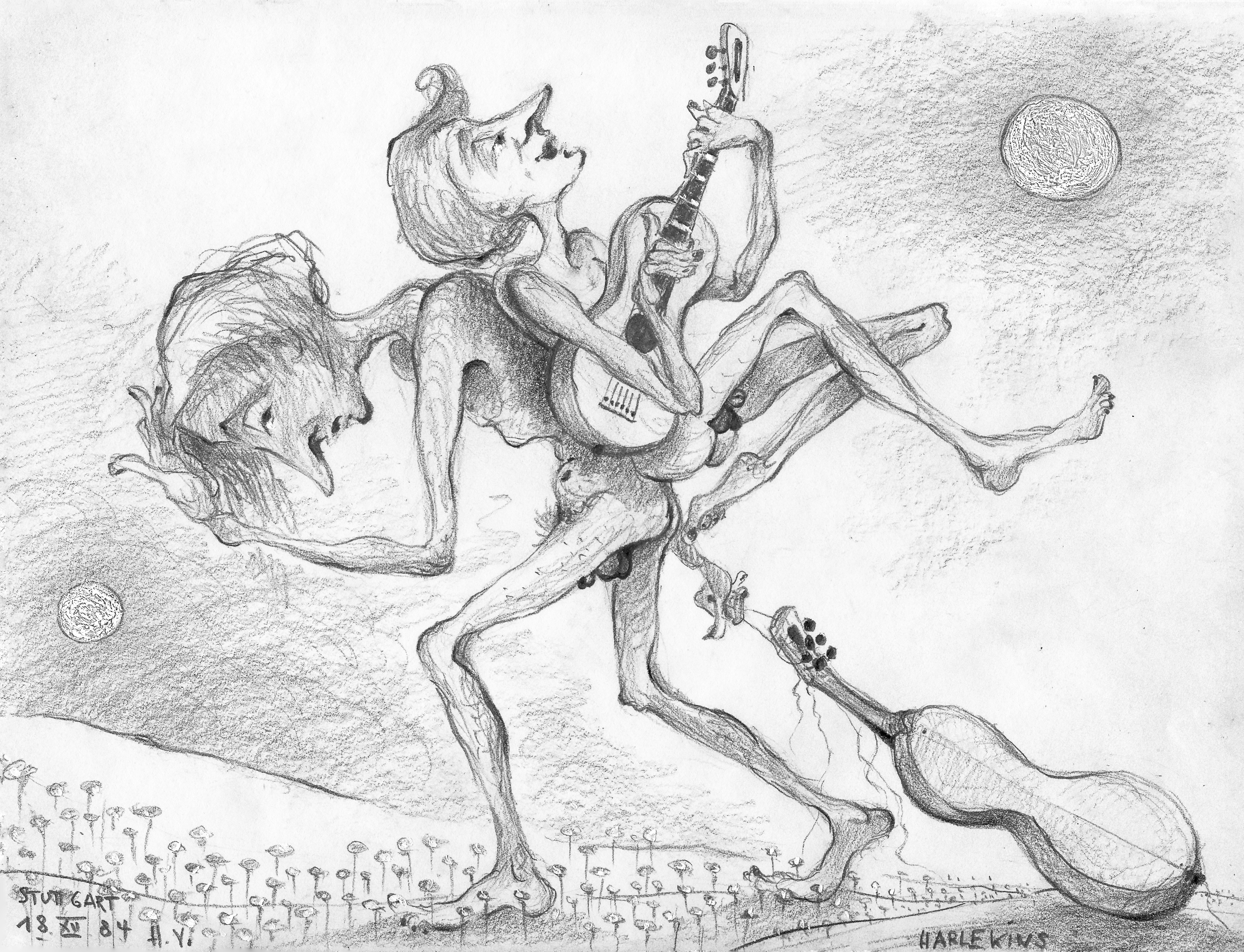
Die beiden Brüder als Harlekins pencil drawing, 1984

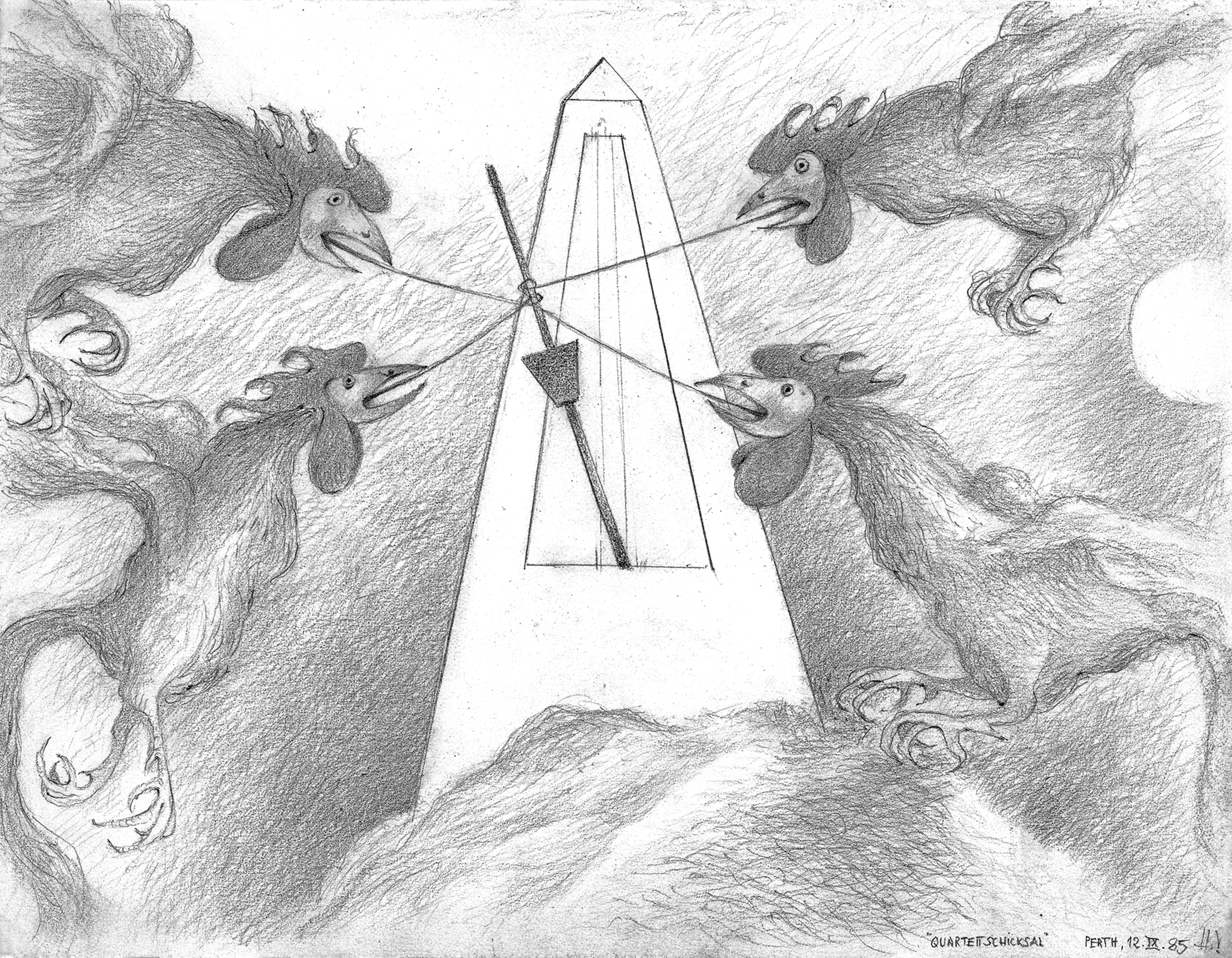
Quartettschicksal pencil drawing, 1985

== Awards and honors ==
- 1959: First prize Deutscher Hochschulwettbewerb
- 1962: Prize winner at the ARD International Music Competition at Munich
- 1966: Winner Geneva International Music Competition with the Melos Quartett
- 1967: Prize winner at the Villa-Lobos International Chamber Music Festival at Rio de Janeiro with the Melos Quartett
- 1990: Order of Merit of the Federal Republic of Germany
- 2020: Staufer medal as a personal award from the minister-president of Baden-Württemberg
