= Antal (given name) =

- Gender: masculine
- Language: Hungarian
- Name day: January 17

Other gender
- Feminine: Antónia

Origin
- Languages: Latin, Greek

Other names
- Nicknames: Anti, Tóni, Tali
- Cognate: Antonius
- Anglicisation: Anthony
- Related names: Anton, Antos

Antal (Hungarian pronunciation: [ˈɒntɒl]) is a Hungarian given name that is a form of Antonius in use throughout Hungary and in parts of Romania. Notable people with this given name include the following:

== First name ==
- Antal Amade de Várkony (1760–1835), Hungarian count
- Antal Andrássy (1742–1799), Hungarian Roman Catholic bishop
- Antal Apró (1913–1994), Hungarian politician
- Antal Bánhidi (1903–1994), Hungarian aviator
- Antal Bánkuti (1923–2001), Hungarian basketball player
- Antal Bartal (1829–1909), Hungarian lexicographer and philologist
- Antal Benda (1910–1997), Hungarian field handball player
- Antal Berkes (1874–1938), Hungarian painter
- Antal Bodó (born 1958), Hungarian wrestler
- Antal Bolvári (1932–2019), Hungarian water polo player
- Antal Csengery (1822–1880), Hungarian historian
- Antal Doráti (1906–1988), Hungarian-born conductor and composer
- Antal Dovcsák (1879–1962), Hungarian politician
- Antal Dunai (born 1943), Hungarian footballer
- Antal Festetics (born 1937), Hungarian zoologist
- Antal Gábor Hollósi (born 1946), Hungarian physician and politician
- Antal Gáborfi (1904 – ???), Hungarian swimmer
- Antal Gelley (1950–1981), Hungarian rower
- Antal Günther (1847–1920), Hungarian politician
- Antal Hajba (1938–2017), Hungarian canoeist
- Antal Hetényi (1947–2023), Hungarian judoka
- Antal Jäkl (born 1971), Hungarian football
- Antal Jákli, known as Tony Jákli (born 1958), Hungarian-born physicist
- Antal Kagerbauer (1814–1872), Transylvanian architect
- Antal Kiss (1935–2021), Hungarian walking athlete
- Antal Kisteleki (born 1945), Hungarian gymnast
- Antal Kocsis (1905–1994), Hungarian boxer
- Antal Kotász (1 September 1929 – 6 July 2003) was a Hungarian football
- Antal Kovács (born 1972), Hungarian judoka
- Antal Lakatos, known as Tony Lakatos (born 1958), Hungarian saxophonist
- Anton Lehár (1876–1962), Hungarian military officer
- Antal Ligeti (1823–1890), Hungarian painter
- Antal Lippay (1923–2003), Hungarian hurdling athlete
- Antal Lovas (1884 – ???), Hungarian long-distance athlete
- Antal Lyka (1908–1976), Hungarian football
- Antal Majnek (born 1951), Hungarian Roman Catholic bishop
- Antal Megyerdi (1939–2013), Hungarian cyclist
- Antal Melis (born 1946), Hungarian rower
- Antal Moldrich (1934–2005), Hungarian pentathlete
- Antal Nagy (footballer born 1944) (born 1944), Hungarian footballer
- Antal Nagy (footballer, born 1956) (born 1956), Hungarian footballer
- Antal Nagy de Buda (died 1437), Hungarian nobleman
- Antal Odri, Hungarian sprinter
- Antal Páger (actor) (1899–1986), Hungarian film actor
- Antal Páger (canoeist), Hungarian canoeist
- Antal Papp (1867–1945), Austro-Hungarian Roman Catholic bishop
- Antal Puhalak (born 1963), Serbian footballer
- Antal Pusztai (born 1978), Hungarian musician
- Antal Reguly (1819–1858), Hungarian linguist and ethnographer
- Antal Ribáry (1924–1992), Hungarian composer
- Antal Rizmayer (born 1939), Hungarian wrestler
- Antal Rogán (born 1972), Hungarian politician
- Antal Róka (1927–1970), Hungarian walking athlete
- Antal Róth (born 1960), Hungarian footballer
- Antal Ruprecht (1748–1818), Hungarian chemist
- Antal Simon (born 1965), Hungarian footballer
- Antal Szkalnitzky (1836–1878), Hungarian architect
- Antal Stašek (born Antonín Zeman, 1843 – 1931), Czech writer and lawyer
- Antal Steer (born 1943), Hungarian wrestler
- Antal Stevanecz (1861–1921), Slovene writer
- Antal Szabó (1910–1972), Hungarian footballer
- Antal Szabó, known as Toni Szabó (1894 – ???), Hungarian footballer
- Antal Száll (born 1944), Hungarian swimmer
- Antal Szalay (1912–1960), Hungarian footballer
- Antal Szebeny (1886–1936), Hungarian rower
- Antal Szendey (1915–1994), Hungarian rower
- Antal Szentmihályi (born 1939), Hungarian footballer
- Antal Szerb (1901–1945), Hungarian writer
- Antal Tapiška (1928–2016), Yugoslav footballer
- Antal Újváry (1907–1967), Hungarian field handball player
- Antal Vágó (1891–1944), Hungarian footballer
- Antal van den Bosch (born 1969), Dutch linguist
- Antal van der Duim (born 1987), Dutch tennis player
- Antal Zalai (born 1981), Hungarian violinist
- Antal Zirczy (1898–1972), Hungarian fencer

== Middle name ==
- Imre Antal Kocsis (born 1948), Hungarian politician
- Paul II Anton, Prince Esterházy (1711–1762), Hungarian prince

== See also ==
- Antal (disambiguation)
- Antal (surname)
- Anal (disambiguation)
- Andal (disambiguation)
- Anta (disambiguation)
- Antar (disambiguation)
- Atal (disambiguation)
