= List of compositions for viola: O to R =

This article lists compositions written for the viola. The list includes works in which the viola is a featured instrument: viola solo, viola and piano, viola and orchestra, ensemble of violas, etc. Catalogue number, date of composition and publisher (for copyrighted works) are also included. Ordering is by composer surname.

This pages lists composers whose surname falls into the O to R alphabetic range. For others, see respective pages:

- List of compositions for viola: A to B
- List of compositions for viola: C to E
- List of compositions for viola: F to H
- List of compositions for viola: I to K
- List of compositions for viola: L to N
- List of compositions for viola: S
- List of compositions for viola: T to Z

== O ==
- Charles Oberthür (1819–1895)

Le pauvre Savoyarde (The Poor Savoyard) or Le pauvre petite Savoyarde, Romance for viola and harp (or piano), Op. 119 (1855)

- Jana Obrovská (1930–1987)

Concertino for violin, viola, double bass and string orchestra (1981); Český Hudební Fond
Smutek sluší viole (Sadness Suits the Viola), Fantasie for viola and chamber orchestra (1978); Český Hudební Fond

- Irina Odăgescu-Țuțuianu (b. 1937)

Melos, Sonata for viola solo, Op. 48 (1982); Editura Muzicală

- Helmut Oehring (b. 1961)

Plath, S. for 2 violas (or other instruments) (1998)
Sexton A. for viola solo (1996); Bote & Bock; Boosey & Hawkes

- Michael Oesterle (b. 1968)

Big City, little city for solo viola and chamber ensemble (2007)
Chaucer Canticles for 2 sopranos, 2 percussionists and viola (2003)

- Will Ogdon (1921–2013)

Variation Suite for violin and viola (1995–1996); Association for the Promotion of New Music

- Eduard Oja (1905–1950)

Melanhoolsed öökullid (Melancholic Owls) for viola and piano (1937)

- Eoin O'Keeffe (b. 1979)

Trio and Over Again for flute, viola and harp (2005); Contemporary Music Centre Ireland

- Mehmet Okonşar (b. 1961)

Ahmet Taner Kışlalı Anısına (Ahmet Taner Kışlalı In Memoriam) for viola solo (2004)
Kaleidoscope No. 3 for viola and piano (2006)

- Kjartan Ólafsson (b. 1958)

Concerto for viola and orchestra (1995); Íslenzk Tónverkamiðstöð
Dimma (Dusk) for viola and piano (1985); Íslenzk Tónverkamiðstöð

- Jane O'Leary (b. 1946)

Why the Hill Sings for viola and piano (2004); Contemporary Music Centre Ireland

- Vivienne Olive (b. 1950)

And the Willows Drowse and Sleep for flute, viola and harp (2002); Furore Verlag
At All, at All ... for 3 mezzo-sopranos and 3 violas (1971); Furore Verlag
Pantjelang Lullaby for viola and cello (1995); Furore Verlag
Rondel for viola and piano (1979); Tonos International Music Editions

- John Oliver (b. 1959)

A Dream of Africa for viola and guitar (2006, 2007)
New Bloom for flute, violin and viola (1988)
3 Trains for viola and piano (2000); Canadian Music Centre
Sonare 1 for viola solo (1982, revised 1992); Canadian Music Centre

- Juan Oliver y Astorga (1733–1830)

Sonata No. 1 in C minor for viola and basso continuo (1803); Cornetto-Verlag
Sonata No. 2 in G major for viola and basso continuo (1804); Cornetto-Verlag
Sonata No. 3 in F minor for viola and basso continuo (1804); Cornetto-Verlag
Sonata No. 4 in C major for viola and basso continuo (1805); Cornetto-Verlag
Sonata No. 5 in C minor for viola and basso continuo (1807)

- Betty Olivero (b. 1954)

Neharót Neharót (נהרות, נהרות) for solo viola, accordion, percussion, 2 string orchestras and tape (2006–2007); Israel Music Institute
Per Viola (לויולה) for viola solo (1993); Israel Music Institute

- Sparre Olsen (1903–1984)

Norsk kjærleikssong (Norwegian Love Song) for viola or cello and piano, Op. 36 No. 3 (1946); Norsk Musikforlag
Tre Dialoger (Three Dialogues) for flute and viola, Op. 50 (1976); Musikk-Huset Forlag

- George Onslow (1784–1853)

Sonata in F major for viola and piano, Op. 16 No. 1 (1819); original for cello and piano
Sonata in C minor for viola and piano, Op. 16 No. 2 (1819); original for cello and piano
Sonata in A major for viola and piano, Op. 16 No. 3 (1819); original for cello and piano

- György Orbán (b. 1947)

Sonata for viola and piano (1997)

- Ben-Zion Orgad (1926–2006)

Monologue (מונולוג) for viola solo (1957); Israeli Music Publications

- Leo Ornstein (1893–2002)

Ballade for saxophone (or clarinet, or viola) and piano, S609 (1955); Poon Hill Press
Two Fantasies for viola and piano, S606-607 (1970s); Poon Hill Press

- Buxton Orr (1924–1997)

Episodes for English horn or viola and piano (1966); Gamber Press; British Music Information Centre
Kate's Piece for alto flute and viola (1997); Gamber Press
Refrains I for English horn or viola and piano (1970); Gamber Press; British Music Information Centre
Refrains II for clarinet, viola and piano (1971); Gamber Press; British Music Information Centre

- Robin Orr (1909–2006)

Sicilienne and Chaconne for viola and piano (1949); Hinrichsen Edition
Sonata for viola and piano (1947); Oxford University Press

- Juan Orrego-Salas (1919–2019)

A Greeting Cadenza for William Primrose for solo viola, Op. 65 (1970); Frangipani Press; MMB Music
Mobili for viola and piano, Op. 63 (1967); Peer Music Classical
Sonata a dúo for violin and viola, Op. 11 (1945); MMB Music

- Jackie Orszaczky (1948–2008)

Ghost for viola and cello (2005)

- Léon Orthel (1905–1985)

Sonata for viola and piano, Op. 52 (1964–1965); Donemus

- Nigel Osborne (b. 1948)

Concerto for viola and orchestra (2008); University of York Music Press
Transformations 1 "Feminist Theologies" for 2 violas (2007); University of York Music Press

- Michiru Ōshima (b. 1961)

Concerto Voix de la vie (ヴィオラ協奏曲「命の声」) for viola and orchestra (2009–2010)
Sonata (ビオラ・ソナタ) for viola and piano (2013)
In the Kitchen for viola solo (2015); composed for Sylvain Durantel and La Cuisine à l'alto

- Reine Colaço Osorio-Swaab (1881–1971)

Sonata No. 3 for viola and piano (1952); Donemus
Suite (Trio No. 1) for flute, violin and viola (1940); Donemus
Trio No. 3 for 2 violins and viola (1950); Donemus
Tsaddiék, Intermezzo for viola and piano (1953); Donemus

- Slavko Osterc (1895–1941)

Sonata for viola and piano

- Willy Ostijn (1913–1993)

Capriccio for violin (or flute, or clarinet), viola and piano (1965); CeBeDeM
Elegie for viola and piano (1956); CeBeDeM
Fata Morgana for clarinet, viola and piano (1952)
Romanza for viola and piano; CeBeDeM
Serenata for violin (or viola) and string orchestra (1954); CeBeDeM
Trio in B minor for violin (or flute), viola and piano (1960); CeBeDeM
Trio "Twilight" for clarinet, viola and piano (1952)

- Otakar Ostrčil (1879–1935)

Sonatina for viola, violin and piano, Op. 22 (1925); Universal Edition

- David Ott (b. 1947)

Concerto for viola and orchestra (1989); Lauren Keiser Music Publishing

- Hall Overton (1920–1972)

Sonata for viola and piano (1959); American Composers Alliance

== P ==
- Luis de Pablo (1930–2021)

Anatomías for viola solo, 2 clarinets, horn, trombone and harp (2005–2007); Edizioni Suvini Zerboni
Ex voto for violin and viola (1995); Edizioni Suvini Zerboni
Monólogo for viola solo (1990–1992); Edizioni Suvini Zerboni

- Giorgio Pacchioni (b. 1947)

Baroquefantasy No. 2 for viola and piano (1996); Ut Orpheus Edizioni

- Niccolò Paganini (1782–1840)

Caprice No. 24; arranged for viola and piano by William Primrose; Carl Fischer
La Campanella; arranged for viola and piano by William Primrose; Edition Schott
Sonata per la Gran' Viola in C minor for viola and orchestra (1834)

- Christopher Painter (b. 1962)

Sonata for viola solo, Op. 60 (2011); Oriana Publications
Sonata for viola and piano, Op. 18 (1986); Vanderbeek & Imrie

- Émile Paladilhe (1844–1926)

Danse noble (Concertino de violes) for 2 violas (or violin and viola) and cello (1902)

- Johannes Palaschko (1877–1932)

Alte Meister für junge Spieler: leichte klassische Stücke (Old Masters for Young Players: Easy Classical Pieces); arrangements for viola and piano (published 1930); Edition Schott
20 Etüden für Viola zur Förderung der Technik und des Vortrags (20 Viola Studies for Technical Advancement and Performance) for viola solo, Op. 36 (1904 or 1905); F. Kistner & C.F. Siegel; International Music Company
10 Künstler-Etüden (10 Artist Studies) for viola solo, Op. 44 (1907); Wilhelm Zimmerman
10 Viola-Studien für vorgerückte Spieler (10 Viola Studies for Advanced Players) for viola solo, Op. 49 (1910); C.F. Schmidt; International Music Company
12 Etüden (12 Studies) for viola solo, Op. 55 (1912); Steingräber; International Music Company
12 Studi (12 Studies) for viola solo, Op. 62 (1923); G. Ricordi
15 Studien (15 Studies) for viola solo, Op. 66 (1926); Edition Schott
15 Studi (15 Studies) for viola solo, Op. 70 (1926); G. Ricordi
24 Études Mélodiques (24 Melodious Studies) for viola (viola alta) solo, Op. 77 (1927); Alphonse Leduc
24 leichte melodische Viola-Studien (24 Easy and Melodious Studies for the Viola) for viola solo, Op. 86 (1930); Edition Schott
25 Studi facili e melodici (25 Easy and Melodious Studies for the Viola) for viola solo in 1st and 3rd positions, Op. 87 (1928); G. Ricordi
Melodische Etüden (Melodious Studies), 25 Etudes for viola solo, or with optional piano accompaniment, Op. 92 (1929); Simrock
25 melodische Studien (25 Melodious Studies) for viola solo, Op. 96 (1930); C. Merseberger; Carl Fischer

- Roman Palester (1907–1989)

Concerto for viola and orchestra (1975–1978); Polskie Wydawnictwo Muzyczne
Trio for flute, viola and harp (1985)

- Robert Moffat Palmer (1915–2010)

Sonata for viola and piano (1948); Peer Music

- Juan Pampin (b. 1967)

Nada for viola and electronic sounds (2006)

- Roxanna Panufnik (b. 1968)

Canto for viola solo (2018)

- Yiannis Papaioannou (1910–1989)

Night (Νυχτερινό) for flute, viola and harp (1937)
Pastorale (Παστοράλε) for flute, viola and harp (1938)
Romanesca (Ρομανέσκα) for flute, viola and harp (1938)
Satyricon (Σατυρικόν) for violin and viola (1978); Philippos Nakas Music House
Trio for flute, viola, guitar (1967)

- Boris Papandopulo (1906–1991)

Sonata for viola and piano (1963); Saveza kompozitora Jugoslavije

- Gérard Pape (b. 1955)

For Maurizio for amplified viola (2003)
Le Fleuve du désir VI (The River of Desire VI) for viola, tape and live electronics (1994); Éditions Musicales Européennes; United Music Publishers

- Jean Papineau-Couture (1916–2000)

Prouesse for viola solo (1985, revised 1987); Canadian Music Centre
Trio en quatre mouvements for clarinet, viola and piano (1974); Canadian Music Centre

- Désiré Pâque (1867–1939)

Sonata for viola and piano, Op. 85 (1915)
Suite de deux pièces (Romance et Allegro Scherzando) (Suite of 2 Pieces) for viola and piano, Op. 24 (1892); published as Op. 49
Suite No. 1 for violin, viola and piano, Op. 17 (1891)
Suite No. 2 for violin, viola and piano, Op. 20 (1892)
Suite No. 3 for violin, viola and piano, Op. 26 (1893)
Suite No. 4 in B♭ major for violin, viola and piano, Op. 27 (1893)
Suite No. 5 for violin, viola and piano, Op. 34 (1896)

- Robert Parris (1924–1999)

Concerto for viola and orchestra (1956); American Composers Alliance
Sonata for viola and piano (1957); American Composers Alliance

- Ian Parrott (1916–2012)

Aquarelle for clarinet or viola and piano (1952); Chester Music
Duetto for violin and viola (1986)

- Boris Parsadanian (1925–1997)

Sonata for viola solo (1977)

- Michael Parsons (b. 1938)

Pentatonic for violin or viola solo (1975, revised 1984); British Music Information Centre

- Arvo Pärt (b. 1935)

Es sang vor Iangen Jahren (Motette für de la Motte) for alto or countertenor, violin and viola (1984); Universal Edition
Fratres for viola and piano (1977, 2003) or for viola and chamber orchestra (1997, 2008); Universal Edition
Spiegel im Spiegel for viola and piano (1978); Universal Edition
Tabula Rasa, Double Concerto for 2 violins (or violin, viola) and string orchestra with prepared piano (1977); Universal Edition

- Ödön Pártos (1907–1977)

Agada (אגדה; Legend) for solo viola, percussion and piano (1960); Israel Music Institute
Concerto No. 1 "Song of Praise" ("שיר תהילה") for viola and orchestra (1949); Israel Music Institute
Concerto No. 2 for viola and orchestra (1957); Israel Music Institute
Elegy (אלגיה) for viola and piano (1974); Israel Music Institute
Shiluvim (שילובים; Fusions) for viola and chamber orchestra (1970); Israel Music Institute
Invenzione a tre – Homage to Debussy (אינוונציה לשלושה בהוקרה לדביסי) for flute, viola and harp (1977); Israel Music Institute
Mourning Music ("Oriental Ballad") ("מוסיקת אבל "בלדה מזרחית) for viola and orchestra (1956); Israel Music Institute
Sinfonia Concertante, Concerto No. 3 for viola and orchestra (1962); Israel Music Institute
Yizkor (יזכור; In memoriam) for viola and string orchestra (1947); Israel Music Institute

- Thomas Pasatieri (b. 1945)

Concerto for viola and orchestra (2012)
Manifesto for viola solo (2012)
Sonata for viola and piano (1994); Subito Music Publishing; Theodore Presser Company
Windsongs for voice, viola and piano (1989); G. Schirmer

- Paul Patterson (b. 1947)

Concerto for viola and string orchestra, Op. 101 (2008–2009); Joseph Weinberger
Elegiac Blues for viola and piano, Op. 97a (2005); Joseph Weinberger
Recitativo for viola solo, Op. 62b (1993); Joseph Weinberger
Tides of Mananan for viola solo, Op. 64 (1988); Joseph Weinberger

- Jiří Pauer (1919–2007)

12 Duets for viola and cello (1969–1970); Český Hudební Fond

- Alex Pauk (b. 1945)

Fibro for viola solo (1973); Canadian Music Centre
Magaru for flute, viola and percussion (1973); Canadian Music Centre

- Stephen Paulus (1949–2014)

Exotic Etudes for viola and piano quartet (violin, viola, cello, piano) (2000); Paulus Publications
Seven for the Flowers near the River for viola and piano (1988); Paulus Publications

- Marcus Paus (b. 1979)

Shostakovich in Memoriam for viola (or violin, or cello) and string orchestra (2006, 2007); Norsk Musikforlag
Triple Concerto for violin, viola and orchestra (2011)

- Paul Paviour (b. 1931)

The Dark Island for viola and piano (2012); Wirripang
4 Duologues for 2 clarinets or 2 violas (1957); Australian Music Centre
The Girl Friends, Suite for viola and piano (1995); The Keys Press; Australian Music Centre
Prelude and Hoe Down for viola and piano (2009); Wirripang; Australian Music Centre

- Anthony Payne (1936–2021)

Amid the Winds of Evening for viola solo (1988); Chester Music
Paraphrases and Cadenzas for clarinet, viola and piano (1969); Chester Music

- José Enrique Pedreira (1904–1959)

Canción de cuna para un infante moribundo (Lullaby for a Dying Child) for cello (or viola) and piano (1954)

- Joseph Pehrson (1950–2020)

Changing Fantasy for flute, viola and piano (1983); Seesaw Music
Entélechies, Trio for 2 violas and clarinet (1977); Seesaw Music
Levitations for viola and piano (2003); Seesaw Music
Three Musicians for guitar, violin and viola (2002); Josrep Publishing
Violahexy for solo viola and electronics (2000); Josrep Publishing
Violarimba for viola and marimba (1988); Seesaw Music

- Ahmad Pejman (b. 1935)

Sonatina for viola and piano (1966); Doblinger Verlag

- Georgs Pelēcis (b. 1947)

Austrumu pasakas Ali Baba un četrdesmit laupītāji tēli (Scenes from the Arabian Nights Story of "Ali Baba and the Forty Thieves") for viola and piano (2005); Musica Baltica

- Krzysztof Penderecki (1933–2020)

Cadenza for solo viola (1984); Edition Schott
Ciaccona in Memoriam Giovanni Paolo II for violin and viola (or cello) (2005, 2009); Edition Schott
Concerto for viola and orchestra (1983); Edition Schott
Sarabande for solo viola (2000, 2009); original from Suite for cello solo; Edition Schott
Tanz (Dance) for viola solo (2009, 2010); original for violin solo; Edition Schott
Tempo di valse for viola solo (2004, 2013); original from Suite for cello solo; Edition Schott

- Edmund J. Pendleton (1899–1987)

Concerto for viola and orchestra (1983)

- Barbara Pentland (1912–2000)

Duo for viola and piano (1960); Canadian Music Centre
Variations for viola solo (1965); Canadian Music Centre

- Albert Périlhou (1846–1936)

Danse rustique, No. 1 from Scènes agrestes for viola (or violin) and piano (c.1923); Éditions Heugel
Menuet for violin or viola and piano (1913); Éditions Heugel

- Piotr Perkowski (1901–1990)

Impression for viola and piano (1927, 1980)
Poéme for viola and piano

- George Perle (1915–2009)

Preludio, Invention and Ostinato for viola and piano, Op. 15 (1943); Instituto Interamericano de Musicología
Serenade No. 1 for viola and chamber ensemble (1962); Galaxy Music
Slow Piece for clarinet and viola, Op. 18
Solo Partita for violin and viola (one player) (1965); Theodore Presser Company
Sonata for viola solo, Op. 12 (1942); Instituto Interamericano de Musicología; Peer Music Classical

- Vincent Persichetti (1915–1987)

Infanta Marina for viola and piano, Op. 83 (1960); Elkan-Vogel; Theodore Presser Company
Parable XVI for viola solo, Op. 130 (1974); Elkan-Vogel

- Jean-Louis Petit (b. 1937)

L'équation du silence for viola and piano, Op. 287 (2000)
Paralipomenes for viola and piano, Op. 335 (2003)
Premier exercice d'admiration for flute, viola and harp, Op. 283 (1999)
Zone III for viola solo, Op. 109 (1983)

- Laurent Petitgirard (b. 1950)

Dialogue for viola and orchestra (2002–2003); Éditions Durand

- Carmen Petra Basacopol (1926–2023)

Cântece rituale (Ritual Songs) for violin and viola, Op. 119 (2007); Editura Muzicală
Confesiuni (Confessions) for viola solo, Op. 132 (2011); Editura Muzicală
Legendă (Legend) for viola and piano, Op. 113; Editura Muzicală

- Goffredo Petrassi (1904–2003)

Duetto for violin and viola (1985); RCA Edizioni Musicali
Violasola for viola solo (1978); Edizioni Suvini Zerboni

- Ivo Petrić (1931–2018)

Duo Concertante for viola and accordion (2006); Pizzicato Verlag Helvetia
Fantasia concertante for viola and chamber orchestra (2009–2011)
Fantasiana, Sonata for viola solo (2008); Pizzicato Verlag Helvetia
In signo Librae for violin and viola (1996); Pizzicato Verlag Helvetia
Landscapes for oboe and viola (1995); Pizzicato Verlag Helvetia
Tako je godel Kurent (Thus Played Kurent), Choreographic Symphonic Poem for viola and orchestra (1976); Društvo Slovenskih Skladateljev
Trio Labacensis for viola and cello (1981); Društvo Slovenskih Skladateljev
Trio lirico for clarinet, viola and piano (2000); Pizzicato Verlag Helvetia
Variacije na Bartókov tema (Variations on a Theme of Bartók) for viola and piano (1954); Pizzicato Verlag Helvetia

- Konstantin Petrossian (b. 1946)

Sonata for viola solo (1975); Sovetsky Kompozitor

- Elena Petrová (1929–2002)

Sonata for viola and piano (1966); Panton Praha

- Vilém Petrželka (1889–1967)

Dvě skladby (2 Pieces) for cello (or viola) and piano, Op. 45 (1947); Panton Praha; Český Hudební Fond

- Allan Pettersson (1911–1980)

Fantasy for viola solo (1936); Edition Wilhelm Hansen
Concerto for viola and orchestra (1979); Nordiska Musikförlaget

- Christian Petzold (1677–1733)

Partita for viola solo; original for viola d'amore; John Markert & Company

- Karel Pexidr (b. 1929)

Dvě dumky (2 Dumkas) for viola and piano
Habél Habálín... for baritone and viola (1998); biblical text from Ecclesiastes; Český Hudební Fond
Májové vidění (Vision of May) for viola and cello
Pět vizí Alberta Einsteina (Five Visions of Albert Einstein) for violin and viola
Versunken in ..., 2 Pieces for viola and piano (published 2015); Edition Brendel

- Malcolm Peyton (b. 1932)

Elegie, Berceuse for solo viola (1978); Association for the Promotion of New Music
Suite Nocturnale for solo viola (1994); Association for the Promotion of New Music

- Michel Philippot (1925–1996)

Concerto for viola and/or violin and orchestra (1984); Éditions Salabert

- Burrill Phillips (1907–1988)

Conversations for violin and viola (1962); Southern Music Publishing
Dialogues for violin and viola (1963); Southern Music Publishing
A Rondo of Rondeaux for viola and piano
Triple Concerto for clarinet, viola, piano and orchestra (1953)

- Ástor Piazzolla (1921–1992)

Dos Piezas Breve for viola and piano; Tonos Musikverlags
Le Grand Tango for viola and piano; Edizioni Bèrben

- Václav Pichl (1741–1805)

6 Duos for violin and viola, Op. 10 (1784)
3 Duets for viola and cello, Op. 14 (1790)
3 Duos concertants for viola and cello, Op. 16 (1792)
6 Duos for violin and viola, Op. 18 (1795)
3 Sonatas for solo violin with accompaniment of violin or viola, Op. 23 (c.1800)

- John Pickard (b. 1963)

Chaconne for viola solo (1998); Bardic Edition

- Alexandra Pierce (1934–2021)

The Norwich Chorale for flute, viola and cello (1976)
A Red, Red Rose for violin and viola; Seesaw Music
White Bongo for flute, viola and harp (1988); Seesaw Music

- Gabriel Pierné (1863–1937)

Sérénade, Op. 7; arranged for viola and piano by Lionel Tertis; Joseph Williams

- Boris Pigovat (b. 1953)

Botticelli's "Magnificat" for viola and piano (2010)
Nigun for viola solo (1997, 2007); Israeli Music Center
Poem for viola and string orchestra (1988); Israeli Music Center
Poem of Dawn, Romantic Music for viola and orchestra (2010)
Prayer for viola and piano (1994) or viola, harp and string orchestra (1995); Israeli Music Center
Requiem "The Holocaust" for viola and orchestra (1994–1995); Israeli Music Center
The Silent Music for viola and harp (or piano) (1997); Israeli Music Center
Sonata for viola and piano (2012)

- Max Pinchard (1928–2009)

Double Concerto for viola, cello and string orchestra (1970)
Grand ciel voilé, 2 Pieces for viola and piano (1980); Le Chant du Monde
L'eau des ombres, 2 Pieces for violin and viola (1976)
Prélude et petite danse for viola and cello (1966)

- Daniel Pinkham (1923–2006)

De profundis for mixed chorus and viola with optional organ (1989); words by Thomas Campion; Ione Press; E.C. Schirmer
Divertimento for trumpet (or flute, or viola) and harp; Ione Press; E.C. Schirmer
Duo for viola and cello (2001); Ione Press; E.C. Schirmer
For Solace in Solitude for viola solo (1991); Ione Press; E.C. Schirmer
Irenicon for clarinet and viola; Ione Press; E.C. Schirmer
Musette for violin (or viola), cello and electronic tape (1972); Ione Press; E.C. Schirmer
8 Poems of Gerard Manley Hopkins for baritone or tenor-baritone and viola; words by Gerard Manley Hopkins; Ione Press; E.C. Schirmer
Sonata for violin and viola (2005); Ione Press; E.C. Schirmer
Sonata da camera for flute (also playing alto flute) and viola (1986); Ione Press; E.C. Schirmer
Sonata da chiesa for viola and organ (1988); Ione Press; E.C. Schirmer
Triple Concerto for violin, viola, cello and string orchestra; Ione Press; E.C. Schirmer

- Matthias Pintscher (b. 1971)

in nomine, Übermalung (Painting) for solo viola (1999); Bärenreiter
Janusgesicht for viola and cello (2001); Bärenreiter
tenebrae for scordatura viola and small ensemble with live electronics (2000–2001); Bärenreiter

- Paul Pisk (1893–1990)

Ballade for viola sextet (1958); American Composers Alliance; American Viola Society Publications
Baroque Chamber Concerto for solo viola and chamber orchestra (1953); Peer Music Classical
Sonata for viola solo (1925)
Three Movements for viola and piano, Op. 36 (1955); American Composers Alliance

- Walter Piston (1894–1976)

Concerto for viola and orchestra (1957); G. Schirmer; Associated Music Publishers
Duo for viola and cello (1949); G. Schirmer; Associated Music Publishers
Interlude for viola and piano (1941); Boosey & Hawkes
Partita for violin, viola and organ (1951); Arrow Music Press; Associated Music Publishers
Souvenir for flute, viola and harp (1967); Associated Music Publishers

- Ildebrando Pizzetti (1880–1968)

Concerto for viola and orchestra (1955, unfinished)
Sonata in Fa for viola and piano (1921); original for cello and piano; adapted by Mario Corti; G. Ricordi

- Francisco Llácer Pla (1918–2002)

Arquitecturas del silencio for viola and double bass, Op. 71 (2001); Piles, Editorial de Música

- Wolfgang Plagge (b. 1960)

2 Episodes for violin and viola, Op. 25 (1985); Music Information Centre Norway
The Lonely Heart for viola and piano, Op. 135 (2004); Lindberg Lyd
Sonata for viola and piano, Op. 30 (1987); Music Information Centre Norway

- Pēteris Plakidis (1947–2017)

Ēnu dejas (Dances of the Shadows) for viola and piano (2007); Musica Baltica

- Robert Planel (1908–1994)

Fantaisie for viola and piano (1963); Éditions Alphonse Leduc

- Raoul Pleskow (1930–2022)

Bagatelles No. 2 for flute, viola and piano (1966); American Composers Alliance

- Mikhail Pletnev (b. 1957)

Concerto for viola and orchestra (1997)

- Ignaz Pleyel (1757–1831)

Concerto in D major for viola (or cello) and orchestra, B. 105 (1790); Internationale Pleyel Gesellschaft
Duo in C major for cello with viola accompaniment, B. 525 (1792)
3 Duos (3 Grand Duos) for violin and viola, B. 526–528 (1795); published as Op. 68 or Op. 69
3 Duos for violin and viola, B. 529–531 (1795–1796); published as Op. 30, Op. 44, Op. 46, or Op. 52
6 Duos for violin and viola, B. 544–549 (1808–1812); published as Op. 4
Sinfonie concertante in B♭ major for violin, viola and orchestra, B. 112 (1791); published as Op. 35
Trio in B♭ major for 2 violins and viola, B. 416

- Anthony Plog (b. 1947)

Four Miniatures for viola and woodwind quintet (1983); Editions Bim

- Alfred Pochon (1878–1959)

Passacaglia for viola solo (1942); Edition Fœtisch

- Ludvík Podéšť (1921–1968)

Suite for viola and piano (1956); Státní Nakladatelství Krásné Literatury, Hudby a Umění; Artia, Prague

- Claire Polin (1926–1995)

Dark Nebulae II: Ma'alot for solo viola and percussion (1981); Seesaw Music
Pièce d'Encore for solo viola (1976); Seesaw Music
Serpentine, Lyrical Instances for solo viola and imaginary dancer (1972); Seesaw Music
Walum Olum for clarinet, viola and piano (1984); Seesaw Music

- Enrico Polo (1868–1953)

3 Studi-Sonate (3 Etude-Sonatas) for viola solo (1950); Edizioni Suvini Zerboni

- Manuel Ponce (1882–1948)

Sonata a dúo (Sonate en duo) for violin and viola (1936–1938); Éditions Maurice Senart

- Jocelyn Pook (b. 1960)

A Storm from Paradise for mezzo-soprano and viola (1989); Chester Music

- Marcel Poot (1901–1988)

Dialogo for viola and piano (1979); CeBeDeM
Duo for violin and viola (1962); CeBeDeM

- Doru Popovici (1932–2019)

Improvizaţii Lirice (Lyric Improvisations) for flute, viola and orchestra, Op. 71 (1982)
Sonata for 2 violas, Op. 25 (1965); Uniunea Bucharest

- Enno Poppe (b. 1969)

Filz (Felt) for viola and chamber orchestra (2014); Ricordi
Fingernagel (Finger Nail) for violin and viola (2009); Ricordi

- David Popper (1843–1913)

Romance in G major for cello (or viola) and piano, Op. 5 (1887)

- Matan Porat (b. 1982)

Hands Off for viola and percussion (2009)
Horo for flute, viola and harp (2010)

- David Porcelijn (b. 1947)

Shades for flute, violin and viola (1975); Donemus
Sinfonia Concertante for viola solo, double bass solo, string quintet and large orchestra, Op. 2 (1985–1986); Donemus

- Quincy Porter (1897–1966)

Blues Lointains for viola and piano (1928); original for flute and piano; adaptation by the composer; American Composers Alliance
Concerto for viola and orchestra (1948); Associated Music Publishers
Divertimento for 2 violins and viola (1949); Valley Music Press
Duo for viola and harp (or harpsichord) (1957); Associated Music Publishers
Duo for violin and viola (1952–1954); Valley Music Press
Little Trio, Suite in E major for flute, violin and viola (1928); Valley Music Press; American Viola Society Publications
Poem for viola and piano (1948); Valley Music Press
Speed Etude for viola and piano (1948); Valley Music Press; American Viola Society Publications
Suite for viola alone (1930); Valley Music Press; American Viola Society Publications

- Alberto Posadas (b. 1967)

Seth for violin and viola (1999); Éditions Musicales Européennes; United Music Publishers
Tombeau et double for viola solo (2014)

- Francis Pott (b. 1957)

Tooryn Vannin (The Towers of Man), Sonata for viola and piano (2013)

- Artin Poturlyan (b. 1943)

Epigraphe, Epistrophes and Epilogue (Епиграф, Епистрофи и Епилог) for violin and viola (2004)
Melomonologue (Меломонолог) for viola solo (2003)

- Henri Pousseur (1929–2009)

Flexions IV for viola solo (1980); Suvini Zerboni, Milano

- Anthony Powers (b. 1953)

Barcarola for viola solo (1987); Oxford University Press

- Ferdinand Praeger (1815–1891)

Elegy in E minor for viola and piano (1885); American Viola Society Publications
Lamentation in F minor for viola and piano (1885)
Morceau in C minor for viola and piano (1888)
Romanza in C major for viola and piano (1885)
Sweet Sorrow in F minor for viola and piano (1888)

- Narong Prangcharoen (b. 1973)

Antahkarana for viola solo (2010)

- Gerhard Präsent (b. 1957)

Arietta ritmica XV for viola and piano, Op. 15 (1984); Verlag Doblinger

- William Presser (1916–2004)

A Hymne to God the Father for tenor, viola and piano or organ (1964); Tritone Press
Prelude and Rondo for viola and piano (1963); Tritone Press; Tenuto Publications; Theodore Presser
Romance and Scherzo for clarinet, viola and piano (1977); Tenuto Publications; Theodore Presser
Serenade for flute and viola (1950); The Composers Press; Henri Elkan Music
Six Songs of Autumn for baritone and viola (1984); Tenuto Publications; Theodore Presser
Twelve Duets for violin and viola (1979); Tenuto Publications

- André Prévost (1931–2001)

Improvisation III for viola solo (1976); Doberman-Yppan Music Publishers; Canadian Music Centre
Sonata for viola and piano (1979); Canadian Music Centre

- Claudio Prieto (1934–2015)

Sugerencia for viola solo (1973); Arambol
Sonata No. 5 for viola and piano (1988, revised 1991); Arambol

- Alexander Prior (b. 1992)

Viola Sonata (2006)

- Alwynne Pritchard (b. 1968)

Une Mort Héroïque for viola and tape (1993); British Music Information Centre Contemporary Voices

- Sergei Prokofiev (1891–1953)

The Cat (Кошка) from Peter and the Wolf for viola and piano, Op. 67 (1936); 1962 transcription by Vadim Borisovsky
Lullaby (Колыбельная) from the oratorio On Guard for Peace (На страже мира) for viola and piano, Op. 124 (1950); 1962 transcription by Vadim Borisovsky
Kijé's Wedding (Свадьба Киже) from the film Lieutenant Kijé for viola and piano, Op. 60 (1934); transcription by Vadim Borisovsky
Pieces from Romeo and Juliet (Пьесы из балета "Ромео и Джульетта") for viola and piano, Op. 64; transcriptions by Vadim Borisovsky

Introduction (Вступление)
The Street Awakens (Улица просыпается)
The Young Juliet (Джульетта-Девочка)
Menuet: Arrival of the Guests (Менуэт: Съезд гостей)
Dance of the Knights (Танец рыцарей)
Mercutio (Меркуцио)
Balcony Scene (Сцена у балкона)
Carnaval (Карнавал)
Dance with Mandolins (Танец с мандолинами) for 2 violas and piano
Romeo and Juliet Meet Friar Laurence (Ромео и Джульетта у патера Лоренцо)
Death of Mercutio (Меркуцио умирает)
Morning Serenade (Утренняя серенада) for 2 violas and piano
Farewell before Parting and Death of Juliet (Прощание перед разлукой и Смерть Джульетты)

- Frank Proto (b. 1941)

Duo for viola and double bass (2007); Liben Music Publishers
Reflections for viola, double bass and stereo tape (1979); Liben Music Publishers
Sonata for 2 violas (2005); Liben Music Publishers
Soundscapes for solo viola (2004); Liben Music Publishers
Trio for violin, viola and double bass (1977); Liben Music Publishers

- Ebenezer Prout (1835–1909)

Romance in F major for viola and piano, Op. 32 (c.1895)
Sonata in D major for clarinet (or viola) and piano, Op. 26 (1890)

- Anatol Provazník (1887–1950)

Concert Fantasy for viola and orchestra, Op. 51 (published 1930s)

- Marta Ptaszyńska (b. 1943)

Elegia in Memoriam John Paul II for viola solo (2005); Polskie Wydawnictwo Muzyczne

- Giacomo Puccini (1858–1924)

Requiem for chorus, viola and organ, SC 76 (1905)

- David del Puerto (b. 1964)

Narciso abatido for flute and viola (1985)
Sequor for flute, viola and guitar (1985)

- Cesare Pugni (1802–1870)

Serenata in C minor for solo viola accompanied by violin, viola and cello
Serenata in D major for solo viola accompanied by violin, viola and cello
Serenata in F major for solo viola accompanied by violin, viola and cello
Serenata No. 3 in B♭ major for solo viola accompanied by 2 violins, viola and cello
Terzettino in G major for 2 violins and viola

- John Purser (b. 1942)

Concerto for viola and string orchestra; Scottish Music Centre

- Eduard Pütz (1911–2000)

Blues for Benni for viola and piano (1991); Edition Schott
Frammenti for 4 violas (1986); Edition Tonger
Meditationen for viola and guitar (1983); Tonos Musikverlag
Sonata for viola and piano (1981); Tonos Musikverlags
Traumstück for viola and harp (1989); Edition Tonger

== Q ==
- Fernand Quinet (1898–1971)

Sonata in C for viola and piano (1928); Éditions Maurice Senart

- Marcel Quinet (1915–1986)

Concerto for viola and orchestra, Op. 50 (1963); CeBeDeM
Les caractères for violin and viola, Op. 64b (1968); CeBeDeM
Sonatina for violin and viola, Op. 55 (1965); CeBeDeM

- José Ignacio Quintón (1881–1925)

Romanza for viola and piano (1920)

== R ==
- Jaan Rääts (1932–2020)

Pala kadentsiga (Piece with a Cadenza) for viola and piano (1981)

- Sergei Rachmaninoff (1873–1943)

Serenade (Серенада) for viola and piano, Op. 3 No. 5; original for piano; transcription by A. Bagrintsev; Declaration of Love: Album of Popular Pieces for Viola and Piano (Страстное Признание: Альбом Популярных Пьес), Muzyka

- Erika Radermacher (b. 1936)

Alnair und Algenib for viola and piano (1993)
2 Impromptus for viola solo (1996)

- Miklós Radnai (1892–1935)

Sonata in D minor for viola and piano (1913); N. Simrock

- Horațiu Rădulescu (1942–2008)

Das Andere for viola solo, Op. 49 (1983); Lucero Print
Agnus Dei for 2 violas, Op. 84 (1991)
Lux Animae II for viola solo, Op. 97 (1996, 2000)
Intimate Rituals XI for viola and tape, Op. 63 (1985, 2003)

- Michael Radulescu (b. 1943)

Suonata for viola solo (1985); Doblinger Verlag

- Kaljo Raid (1921–2005)

Largo for viola and piano (1999); Eres Edition Musikverlag; Canadian Music Centre

- Osmo Tapio Räihälä (b. 1964)

Håkan Belgiassa (Håkan in Belgium; Håkan en Belgique) for viola and orchestra (2002); Uusinta Publishing Company; Finnish Music Information Centre

- Priaulx Rainier (1903–1986)

Solo Suite for cello or viola solo (1963–1965); Schott Music
Sonata for viola and piano (1945); Schott Music

- Nikolai Rakov (1908–1990)

Story (Рассказ) for viola and piano (1930); Muzgiz

- Imant Raminsh (b. 1943)

Dialogues for violin and viola (1983); Canadian Music Centre
Rise Up, My Love, My Fair One for female chorus, viola and piano (1998); Canadian Music Centre
What Voices in an Unknown Tongue for soprano, mixed chorus and viola (2002)

- Luis Antonio Ramírez (1923–1995)

Meditación a la memoria de Segundo Ruis Belvis for viola and piano (1973); Seesaw Music Corporation

- Primož Ramovš (1921–1999)

Aforizmi (Aphorisms) for viola and piano (1961); Edicije Društvo Slovenskih skladateljev
Concerto for violin, viola and orchestra (1961); Edicije Društva Slovenskih Skladateljev; Breitkopf und Härtel
Nokturno for viola and piano (1959); Edicije Društva Slovenskih Skladateljev
Skice (Sketches) for viola and piano (1958); Edicije Društva Slovenskih Skladateljev
Transformacije (Transformations) for 2 violas and 10 string instruments (1963); Edicije Društva Slovenskih Skladateljev

- Paul Ramsier (1937–2021)

Road to Hamelin for viola, narrator and orchestra (or piano) (1978, 1986); original for double bass, narrator and orchestra; Boosey & Hawkes

- Wilhelm Ramsøe (1837–1895)

Romanze for viola and piano

- Shulamit Ran (b. 1949)

Perfect Storm for viola solo (2010); Theodore Presser Company

- Bernard Rands (b. 1934)

"...sans voix parmi les voix..." for flute, viola and harp (1995); Helicon Music Corporation

- Behzad Ranjbaran (b. 1955)

Concerto for violin, viola and orchestra (2009); Theodore Presser Company

- György Ránki (1907–1992)

Concerto (Brácsaverseny) for viola and orchestra (1978)

- Kurt Rapf (1922–2007)

Sonata for viola and piano (1995)
2 Stücke (2 Pieces) for cello or viola and piano (1967)
Trio for flute, viola and harp (1987)

- Günter Raphael (1903–1960)

Concertino in D major for viola and chamber orchestra (1941); Breitkopf und Härtel
Duo in C minor for violin and viola, Op. 47 No. 2 (1940); Bärenreiter
Duo in A major for viola and cello, Op. 47 No. 4 (1941); Willy Müller, Süddeutscher Musikverlag; Bärenreiter
Sonata in C minor for solo viola, Op. 7 (1924); Breitkopf und Härtel
Sonata in G major for solo viola, Op. 46 No. 3 (1940); Bärenreiter
Sonata in E minor for solo viola, Op. 46 No. 4 (1946); Bärenreiter
Sonata [No. 1] in E♭ major for viola and piano, Op. 13 (1925); Breitkopf und Härtel
Sonata No. 2 for viola and piano, Op. 80 (1954); Breitkopf und Härtel
Sonatina for flute, viola and harp, Op. 65 No. 1 (1948); Breitkopf und Härtel

- Eda Rapoport (1890–1968)

Chant hébraïque for viola or cello and piano, Op. 13 (1939); Maxwell Weaner Publications
Poem for viola and piano, Op. 14 (1939); Maxwell Weaner Publications

- Alexander Raskatov (b. 1953)

Bel Canto for viola, string orchestra and temple gong (2008); Hans Sikorski
Canti (Канты) for viola solo, Op. 7 (1978); Sovetsky Kompozitor
Concerto "Path" (Путь; Chemin; Weg) for viola and orchestra (2002); M.P. Belaieff
Miserere for viola, cello and orchestra (1992); M.P. Belaieff
Primal Song (Urlied) for viola and 15 strings (1995); M.P. Belaieff
Six Psalmodies for harp, viola and 15 strings (1990); Hans Sikorski
Sonata for Yuri Bashmet for viola and piano (1988); Edition Peters
Songs of Sunset (Sonnenuntergangslieder) for mezzo-soprano, viola and piano (1995); M.P. Belaieff

- Sunleif Rasmussen (b. 1961)

Sonata No. 1 for viola solo (2016); Edition Wilhelm Hansen
Rondo: Mantra und Melos for violin and viola (2019); Edition Wilhelm Hansen

- Émile Pierre Ratez (1851–1934)

Douze pièces pittoresques (12 Picturesque Pieces) for violin (or viola) and piano, Op. 8 (1886); Éditions Alphonse Leduc
Pièce romantique in C minor for viola and piano, Op. 70 (ca. 1930); Éditions Musicales J. Gras
Sonata in E♭ for viola and piano, Op. 48 (1907); Breitkopf; Rouart-Lerolle; Salabert

- Karol Rathaus (1895–1954)

Rapsodie notturna for viola and piano, Op. 66 (1950); original for cello and piano; adaptation by Carl Ebert; Boosey and Hawkes

- Eldon Rathburn (1916–2008)

Soliloquy for viola solo (1999); Canadian Music Centre

- Mikhail Raukhverger (1901–1989)

Concerto for viola and orchestra (published 1986); Muzyka
3 Pieces (3 Пьесы) for viola and piano (1980); Sovetsky Kompozitor

- Elizabeth Raum (b. 1945)

Persephone and Demeter for violin, viola and orchestra (2004)
Prayer and Dance of Praise for viola and piano (1996); Canadian Music Centre
Renovated Rhymes for soprano, viola and piano (1999); words by John V. Hicks; Canadian Music Centre
Reverie for viola and piano (1987); Canadian Music Centre
Romance for viola and piano or chamber orchestra (2001); Canadian Music Centre

- Maurice Ravel (1875–1937)

Pièce en forme de habanera for viola and piano (1907); transcription by Paul-Louis Neuberth

- Irma Ravinale (1937–2013)

Dialoghi (Dialogues) for viola, guitar and orchestra (1977)

- Alan Rawsthorne (1905–1971)

Sonata for viola and piano (1937, revised 1953); Oxford University Press
Suite for flute, viola and harp (1968); Oxford University Press

- Igor Raykhelson (b. 1961)

Adagio for viola and string orchestra (2002); Éditions Alphonse Leduc
Concerto in A major for viola and orchestra
Concerto for violin, viola, piano and chamber orchestra
Jazz Suite (Джазовая сюита) for viola, saxophone and orchestra (1999)
Mirage (Мираж) for viola and string orchestra (2006)
Reflections (Отражения) for violin (or flute), viola and string orchestra (2003); Éditions Alphonse Leduc
Sonata in A minor for viola and piano (2001)

- Gardner Read (1913–2005)

Fantasy for viola and orchestra, Op. 38 (1937); Associated Music Publishers
Plain Water for chorus, viola and piano, Op. 117a No. 1 (1968); Canyon Press
Poem for viola or horn and string orchestra, Op. 31 (1935); Carl Fischer
A Shepherd Lone Lay Fast Asleep for chorus, viola and organ (1965); Lawson-Gould Music Publishers

- Ferdinand Rebay (1880–1953)

Sonata in D minor for viola and guitar; Philomele Editions

- Napoléon Henri Reber (1807–1880)

Berceuse for viola and piano, Op. 15 No. 5 (c.1840); original from 6 Pièces for violin and piano; transcription by the composer; Éditions Costallat; Éditions Gérard Billaudot
Valse in F major for viola and piano, Op. 9 No. 4 (1838)

- Herman Rechberger (1947–2022)

Rotazioni for violin (or viola) solo (1979); Edition Modern

- Martin Christoph Redel (b. 1947)

Innen-Lieder: Wachendorff-Aphorismen (Inner Songs: Wachendorff-Aphorisms) for viola solo, Op. 67 (2010)
Rhapsodie for viola and orchestra, Op. 36 (1987); Bote & Bock; Boosey & Hawkes
Suissesquisses (Swissketches), Duo for violin and viola, Op. 62 (2006–2007); Bote & Bock; Boosey & Hawkes
Trio for flute, viola and cello, Op. 3 (1965)

- Alfred Reed (1921–2005)

Rhapsody for viola and orchestra (1956); Charles H. Hansen Music; Boosey & Hawkes

- William Henry Reed (1876–1942)

Rhapsody in D major for viola and piano (1918); Augener

- William Leonard Reed (1910–2002)

Fantasy for flute, viola and harp (1934)
Suite "The Top Flat" for viola and piano, Op. 41 (1947)

- Max Reger (1873–1916)

Romanze in G major for viola and piano (1901); original for violin and piano; transcription by Hans Sitt (1924)
Sechs Stücke (6 Pieces) for viola (or violin) and piano (or organ), Op. 47 (1900); arrangement by Eberhard Werdin from Sechs Orgeltrios (6 Organ Trios) for solo organ; Doblinger Verlag
Sonata in A♭ major for viola and piano, Op. 49 No. 1 (1900); original for clarinet and piano
Sonata in F♯ minor for viola and piano, Op. 49 No. 2 (1900); original for clarinet and piano
Sonata in B♭ major for viola and piano, Op. 107 (1908–1909); also for clarinet and piano
Suite No. 1 in G minor for viola solo, Op. 131d (1915)
Suite No. 2 in D major for viola solo, Op. 131d (1915)
Suite No. 3 in E minor for viola solo, Op. 131d (1915)
Trio No. 1 in B minor for violin, viola and piano, Op. 2 (1891)

- Theobald Rehbaum (1835–1918)

Trio-Suite in E minor for violin, viola and piano, Op. 23 (1884)

- Bernard Reichel (1901–1992)

Chaconne for viola (or cello) and piano (1985)
Concerto for viola and orchestra (1956)
Gib Fried zu unsrer Zeit, O Herr for soprano, viola solo and string orchestra (1980)
Sonata breve: Gib Fried zu unsrer Zeit for viola solo, flute and 5 strings (1974)
Sonatina for viola and piano (1946)
Suite for viola and harpsichord (1963)
Trio for flute (or oboe), viola and piano (1944)
Trio for 2 flutes and viola (1938)
Variations sur le choral "Après la longue et sombre nuit" for viola and piano (1943)

- Aribert Reimann (b. 1936)

Solo for viola solo (1996); Edition Schott

- Carl Reinecke (1824–1910)

Phantasiestücke (Fantasy Pieces) for viola and piano, Op. 43 (1857)
10 kleine Stücke (10 Little Pieces) for viola and piano, Op. 213 (1891); Edition Schott
Trio in A major for clarinet, viola and piano, Op. 264 (1903)

- Karel Reiner (1910–1979)

Repliky (Replicas), Trio for flute, viola and harp (1973); Český Hudební Fond
Sloky (Verses) for viola and piano (1975); Český Hudební Fond; G. Ricordi München

- Otto Reinhold (1899–1965)

Konzertante Musik for flute, viola and orchestra (published 1950?); Breitkopf & Härtel
Musik for viola and piano (published 1952); Bärenreiter Verlag
Trio-Serenade for clarinet, viola and piano (1948)

- Jay Reise (b. 1950)

La Choumine, Poem for viola and piano (1984); Merion Music; Theodore Presser Company

- Franz Reizenstein (1911–1968)

Concert Fantasy for viola and piano, Op. 42 (1965–1966); Hinrichsen Edition
Sonata for solo viola, Op. 45 (1967)

- Josef Rejcha (1752–1795)

Concerto in E♭ major for viola and orchestra, Op. 2 No. 1

- Paolo Renosto (1935–1988)

Avant d'écrire for viola and piano (1967); Ricordi
Fast for 2 violins and viola (1974); Ricordi
In fondo alla pagina for viola solo (1984)
Presenza 3 for viola solo (1979); Ricordi
Scops: Strutture e improvvisazioni for viola and orchestra (1966); Ricordi

- Hermann Reutter (1900–1985)

Aus dem Hohelied Salomonis (From the Song of Solomon), Concerto Grosso for alto, viola, piano and orchestra (1956); Schott Music
Cinco Caprichos sobre Cervantes (5 Caprices on Cervantes) for viola solo (1968); Schott Music
Fünf antike Oden nach Gedichten von Sappho (5 Ancient Odes after Poetry of Sappho) for mezzo-soprano, viola and piano, Op. 57 (1947); Schott Music
Kleines geistliches Konzert (Little Sacred Concerto) for alto and viola (1953); Schott Music
Musik for viola and piano (1951); Schott Music
Solo-Cantata on words of Matthias Claudius for alto, viola and piano (or organ), Op. 45 (1948); Schott Music

- Michèle Reverdy (b. 1943)

Chimère, Concerto for viola and 18 instruments (1994); Gérard Billaudot
Les Jeux de Protée for flute, viola and harp (1984); Éditions Salabert
Rencontres for viola solo (1994); Gérard Billaudot
Tetramorphie for viola and percussion (1976); Alphonse Leduc

- Peter Reynolds (1958–2016)

Bell Patterns for viola solo (1988); Welsh Music Information Centre; British Music Information Centre
Dumpe for viola and piano (1990); Welsh Music Information Centre

- Antal Ribáry (1924–1992)

Dialoghi (Dialogues) for viola and orchestra (1967)
Sonata for viola and piano (1958); Editio Musica Budapest

- Alan Richardson (1904–1978)

Autumn Sketches for viola and piano (1949); Oxford University Press; Comus Edition
Duo for violin and viola
Intrada for viola and piano (1939); Oxford University Press; Comus Edition
Prelude in A and Gavotte in A from Solo Violin Partita in E by Johann Sebastian Bach for viola and piano (1939); Oxford University Press; Scottish Music Centre
Rhapsody for viola and piano (1977); Comus Edition
Sonata for viola and piano, Op. 21 (1948); Augener Edition; Scottish Music Centre
Sussex Lullaby for viola (or cello) and piano (1938); Oxford University Press; Comus Edition
Three Pieces for oboe, viola and piano (1970s); Comus Edition
Trio Sonata for viola, bass clarinet and piano (1973); Comus Edition

- Marga Richter (1926–2020)

Aria and Toccata for viola and string orchestra (1957); EMI Music
Darkening of the Light for viola solo (1961); Carl Fischer
Düsseldorf Concerto for flute, viola, harp and small orchestra (1981–1982); Carl Fischer
Suite for solo viola (1962); Harold Branch Publishing; Carl Fischer

- Nico Richter (1915–1945)

Serenade for flute, violin and viola (1945); Donemus
Trio for flute, viola and guitar (1935); Donemus

- Jaroslav Řídký (1897–1956)

Ukolébavka (Lullaby) for viola and piano, Op. 26a (1932); Edition Sádlo, Praha
Adagio for viola and piano (1932); Edition Sádlo, Praha

- Alan Ridout (1934–1996)

Seascapes, 6 Easy Pieces for viola or cello and piano (1991); Associated Board of the Royal Schools of Music
Whom Time Will Not Reprieve for countertenor and viola (1989); British Music Information Centre

- Godfrey Ridout (1918–1984)

Ballade for viola and string orchestra (1938); Canadian Musical Heritage Society; Canadian Music Centre
Ballade II for viola and string orchestra (1980); Canadian Music Centre

- Wallingford Riegger (1885–1961)

Elegy for viola and piano (1915)
Lullaby for cello (or viola) and piano (1922)
Revery for cello (or viola) and piano (1920)
Variations for violin and viola (or violin and viola ensemble), Op. 57 (1956); Associated Music Publishers

- Vittorio Rieti (1898–1994)

Pastorale e fughetta for flute, viola and piano (or harpsichord) (1966); General Music Publishing
Triple Concerto for violin, viola, piano and orchestra (1971); General Music Publishing

- Wolfgang Rihm (b. 1952)

Canzona for 4 violas (1982); Universal Edition
Canzona nuova for 5 violas (2006); longer version of Canzona; Universal Edition
Concerto [No. 1] for viola and orchestra (1979–1983); Universal Edition
Concerto No. 2 "Über die Linie" IV for viola and orchestra (2000–2002); Universal Edition
Doppelgesang No. 1 for viola, cello and small orchestra (1980); Universal Edition
Doppelgesang No. 3 for clarinet, viola and orchestra (2004); Universal Edition
Fetzen IV for viola and accordion (2004); Universal Edition
Stabat Mater for viola and baritone (2019); Universal Edition
Solo e pensoso, 2 Sonnets of Petrarch for baritone (or tenor), viola and harp (2004); Universal Edition

- Dennis Riley (1943–1999)

Apparitions for flute, viola and harp (1983–1984); C. F. Peters
Chansons funèbres (in Remembrance of Jacob Druckman on Poems of Emily Dickinson) for mixed chorus and viola (1997); C. F. Peters
Concertante Music No. 3 for viola and orchestra (1972–1974); C. F. Peters
Serenade for viola and small orchestra (1988)
Serenade (based on the opera Rappaccini's Daughter) for viola and orchestra (1996); C. F. Peters
Variations III for viola solo (1972); C. F. Peters
Wedding Canticle (Psalmus CXXVII) for baritone and viola, Op. 11B (1967)
Winter Music for violin and viola (1980–1981); C. F. Peters

- John Rimmer (b. 1939)

Concerto for viola and orchestra (1980); Waiteata Music Press
Mahurangi – Place of Importance for solo viola (1992); Catena Press

- João Guilherme Ripper (b. 1959)

Concertino for viola and string orchestra (1988, 2010); Jeanné Music Publications
Trio for viola, cello and piano (2007)

- Anthony Ritchie (b. 1960)

Concerto for viola and orchestra, Op. 64 (1994–1995); Bellbird Publications; Centre for New Zealand Music
Four Bagatelles for percussion and viola, Op. 106 (2003)
Meditation for viola and piano, Op112 (2004)
Three Pieces for viola and guitar, Op. 118 (2005)
Viola Sonata, Op. 64c (1994–1995); arrangement of the Viola Concerto for viola and piano

- Alexander Ritter (1833–1896)

Tonstück in D minor for viola and piano (published 1901); Joseph Aibl; Universal Edition

- Hermann Ritter (1849–1926)

Auf den Wellen (On the Waves) for viola (viola alta) and piano, Op. 27 (published 1878)
Concert-Phantasie No. 1 in C minor for viola (viola alta) and orchestra or piano, Op. 35 (1886)
Concert-Phantasie No. 2 for viola (viola alta) and piano or piano, Op. 36
Dithyrambe for viola (viola alta) and piano, Op. 74 (published 1907)
Erinnerung an die Alpen (Souvenir of the Alps) for viola (viola alta) and piano, Op. 11
Erinnerung an Schottland: Phantasie mit Benutzung altschottischer Weisen (Souvenir of Scotland: Fantasy on an Old Scottish Air) for viola (viola alta) and piano, Op. 34
Gesangsstück in D major for viola (viola alta) and piano, Op. 66
Nach slavischen Eindrücken (After Slavic Impressions) for viola (viola alta) and piano, Op. 33
1. Elegie in G minor
2. Introduktion und Mazurka in A minor/C major
Italienische Suite (Italian Suite) for viola (viola alta) and orchestra or piano, Op. 37
1. Barcarole (Venezia)
2. Elegie (Roma) in A minor
3. Tarantella (Napoli)
Jagdstück for viola (viola alta) and piano, Op. 17 (published 1883)
Melodia religiosa for viola (viola alta) and piano
Rokoko: 2 Vortragsstücke (Rococo: 2 Concert Pieces) for viola (viola alta) and piano, Op. 73 (published 1907)
1. Gavotte
2. Pastorale und Menuett
Schlummerlied (Lullaby) for viola (viola alta) and piano, Op. 9
Spinnerlied (Spinning Song) in B♭ major for viola (viola alta) and piano, Op. 28 (published 1878)
Ständchen (Serenade) for viola (viola alta) and piano, Op. 70 (published 1905)
Zwei Stücke (2 Pieces) for viola (viola alta) and piano, Op. 7 (published 1883)
1. Idylle
2. Elfengesang
Zwei Stücke (2 Pieces) for viola (viola alta) and piano, Op. 32
1. Pastorale und Gavotte in A minor
2. Im Traume in G major
Zwei Stücke (2 Pieces) for viola (viola alta) and piano, Op. 48
1. Valse caprice
2. Moto perpetuo
Zwei Stücke (2 Pieces) for viola (viola alta) and piano, Op. 65
1. Andante
2. Allegretto Scherzando

- Jean Rivier (1896–1987)

Concertino for viola and orchestra (1935); Éditions Salabert; United Music Publishers
Doloroso et Giocoso for viola and piano (1969); Éditions Gérard Billaudot; United Music Publishers

- John Donald Robb (1892–1989)

Concerto for viola and orchestra, Op. 24 (1953)

- Jeremy Dale Roberts (1934–2017)

Wieglied for viola solo (1999); University of York Music Press
Hamadryad for alto flute, viola and guitar (2001); University of York Music Press

- Michael Robinson (b. 1933)

Sonata Movement for viola and piano (1960)

- George Rochberg (1918–2005)

Sonata for viola and piano (1979); Theodore Presser Company

- Mauricio Rodríguez (b. 1976)

Crepitum for viola solo (2011)

- Kurt George Roger (1895–1966)

Irish Sonata for viola and piano, Op. 37 (1939); Francis, Day & Hunter; Alfred Lengnick
Sonata for viola solo, Op. 79 (1954)
Suite for viola and piano, Op. 84 (1954)

- Miquel Roger Casamada (1954–2017)

Nocturn for viola and piano (1980)

- Jean Rogister (1879–1964)

Adieu (Farewell) for viola and string orchestra (1919); Schott Music
Concerto in A major for viola and orchestra (1914)
Fantaisie concertante for viola and orchestra (1910); Édition J. Rogister
Fantaisie sur un cramignon liégeois for viola and orchestra; Éditions Musicales Bayard-Nizet
Libellule (Dragonfly), Pièce caractéristique for violin or viola and piano (1919); Edition Schott
Prélude for viola solo; Éditions Musicales Bayard-Nizet

- Miguel Ángel Roig-Francoli (b. 1953)

Piezas inviolables for viola and piano (1978)

- Kjell Roikjer (1901–1999)

Divertimento for flute and viola, Op. 45; Skandinavisk Musikforlag
Introduktion og tema med variationer (Introduction and Theme with Variations) for viola solo, Op. 29; Skandinavisk Musikforlag

- Alessandro Rolla (1757–1841)

Adagio e Tema con Variazioni in G major for viola and orchestra, BI 333
Concertino in E♭ major for viola and string orchestra, BI 328; for viola and full orchestra, BI 546
Divertimento in F major for viola and string orchestra, BI 330
Divertimento in G major for viola and orchestra, BI 332
Duo in F major for viola and cello, BI 326
6 Duos "Torinese" for 2 violas, WoBI 1–6; Gems Music Publications
22 Duos for 2 violas, BI 1–22; Gems Music Publications
78 Duos for violin and viola, BI 33–110; Gems Music Publications
3 Esercizi (3 Capricci; 3 Caprices) for viola solo, BI 311, 313, 314; Gems Music Publications
2 Intonazioni for viola solo, BI 310, 312; Gems Music Publications
Introduzione e Divertimento in F major for viola and orchestra (incomplete), BI 329
Musica Ridotta for viola solo, BI 316–322; Gems Music Publications
Rondo in G major for viola and orchestra, BI 331
Sonata in E♭ major for viola and basso
Sonata in D minor for viola and basso
10 Studi-Duetti (10 Etude-Duets) for 2 violas, BI 23–32; Gems Music Publications
3 Terzettini for 2 flutes and viola
Trattenimenti Notturni for 2 violins and viola
Viola Concerto in B♭ major, BI 555 (unfinished)
Viola Concerto in C major, BI 541; Gems Music Publications
Viola Concerto in D major, BI 542 (unfinished)
Viola Concerto in D major, BI 543; Gems Music Publications
Viola Concerto in E♭ major, BI 544
Viola Concerto in E♭ major, BI 545; Gems Music Publications
Viola Concerto in E♭ major, BI 547; Gems Music Publications
Viola Concerto in E major, BI 548
Viola Concerto in F major, BI 549
Viola Concerto in F major, BI 550; Gems Music Publications
Viola Concerto in F major, BI 551
Viola Concerto in F major, BI 552
Viola Concerto in F major, BI 553
Viola Concerto in F major, BI 554

- Antonio Rolla (1798–1837)

6 Piccole Pastorale (6 Idylles) for viola solo (1836–1837)
Variazioni Brillanti in F for viola and orchestra, Op. 13 (1822)

- Johann Georg Röllig (1710–1790)

Duet in C for 2 violas, Sp. 581; Prima La Musica!

- Fausto Romitelli (1963–2004)

Ganimede for viola solo (1986); Ricordi

- Lucia Ronchetti (b. 1963)

Amore, Music Theatre for voice, viola and live electronics (2002)
Éluvion-Étude for viola and live electronics (1997)
Il sonno di Atys: Studio da Lully for viola and live electronics (2002–2003)
La follia for viola and piano (1983)
Last Desire Cadenza for viola and live electronics (2006)
Poèmes, Paysages chez Proust for viola and piano (1983)
Requiem for viola solo (1982, revised 2006)
A Solo from Last Desire for viola solo (2005)
Studi profondi for viola solo (1984)
Studio di dedica for flute and viola (1984)
Studio di fiori da Egon Schiele for viola and guitar (1986)
Une leçon de ténèbres for ensemble of 11 violas (1985)

- Julius Röntgen (1855–1932)

Concerto in A minor for 2 violins, viola, cello and orchestra (1930); Donemus
Duo in E♭ major for violin and viola (1869)
Introduction, Fugue, Intermezzo and Finale in C♯ minor for violin, viola, cello and orchestra (1930); Donemus
Lyrische Gänge (Lyric Journeys), 5 Songs for mezzo-soprano, viola and piano (1926)
Sonata No. 1 in C minor for viola and piano (1924); Donemus
Sonata No. 2 in A♭ major for viola and piano (1924–1925); Donemus
Sonata No. 3 in A minor for viola and piano (1925); Donemus
Terzetto for flute, violin and viola (1923); Donemus
Trio in E♭ major for clarinet, viola and piano (1921); Donemus
Triple Concerto in B♭ major for violin, viola, cello and string orchestra (1922); Donemus

- Willard Roosevelt (1918–2008)

Five Songs for soprano and viola (1975); American Composers Alliance
Serenade for oboe, viola and cello (1955); American Composers Alliance
Song and Dance Suite for oboe, clarinet and viola (1975); American Composers Alliance
Suite for viola solo (1963); American Composers Alliance

- Guy Ropartz (1864–1955)

Adagio for viola and orchestra or piano (1899); original for cello and orchestra or piano; transcription by René Pollain; Dupont-Metzner; Rouart-Lerolle et Cie.; Éditions Salabert

- Hilding Rosenberg (1892–1985)

Concerto for viola and string orchestra, Lyne 107 (1942); revised version for viola and orchestra (1945, 1964); Nordiska musikförlaget
Concerto No. 1 for violin, viola, cello and string orchestra, Lyne 120 (1946)
Ett litet stycke (A Little Piece; Nocturne; Adagio funèbre) for viola and string orchestra (or organ, or piano), Lyne 94 (1935, 1937); Edition Suecia
Symphonie Concertante for violin, viola, oboe, bassoon and orchestra, Lyne 69 (1935)

- Mathew Rosenblum (b. 1954)

Two Harmonies for viola, percussion and piano/sampler (2011); Plurabelle Music Publishing

- Jakob Rosenhain (1813–1894)

Sonata in D minor for viola and piano, Op. 98 (published 1886); Breitkopf & Härtel

- Antonio Rosetti (c.1750–1792)

Viola Concerto in G major, C15

- Niels Rosing-Schow (b. 1954)

Chamber Concerto for alto flute, viola and orchestra (1986–1987); Edition Samfundet
Figura for viola and piano (1985); Edition Wilhelm Hansen
Spectre du temps for flute, viola and harp (2004); Edition Wilhelm Hansen
Trio for flute, viola and harp (1983); Edition Wilhelm Hansen

- Nikolai Roslavets (1881–1944)

Sonata No. 1 for viola and piano (1926); completed by Alexander Raskatov; Edition Schott
Sonata No. 2 for viola and piano (1930); completed by Alexander Raskatov; Edition Schott

- Arnold Rosner (1945–2013)

Canzona sopra un tema di Monteverdi for brass octet and viola, Op. 38 (1968)
A Duet for Violas, Op. 94 (1991); Horizon Bay Music
Minyan for viola and guitar, Op. 124 (2013)

- Bruno Rossignol (b. 1958)

Interlude Maya for viola and guitar (1997); Éditions Delatour

- Nino Rota (1911–1979)

Intermezzo in B minor for viola and piano (1945); Ricordi Music Publishing
Sonata in Sol [No. 1] for viola and piano (1935); Edition Schott
Sonata No. 2 in C major for viola and piano (1945); Ricordi Music Publishing

- Doina Rotaru (b. 1951)

Obsessivo for saxophone, viola, pre-recorded sounds and live electronics (2008)
Umbre (Shadows) for viola, 14 stringed instruments and percussion (1999)

- Paul Rougnon (1846–1934)

Allegro appassionato in D minor for viola and piano (1916); Editions Combre
Concertino romantique in D minor for viola and piano, Op. 138 (1895); J. Hamelle
Fantaisie-Caprice in G major for viola and piano (1922); Alphonse Leduc
Fantaisie de Concert in G minor for viola and piano (1902); Editions Combre
Grande Étude de Concert for viola and piano; Editions Combre
Suite de Concert for viola and piano; Editions Combre

- Christopher Rouse (1949–2019)

Subjectives X for solo viola (1973); American Composers Alliance

- Albert Roussel (1869–1937)

Aria for viola and piano or orchestra (1928); original for voice and piano; transcription by Paul-Louis Neuberth (1930); Éditions Alphonse Leduc
Trio for flute, viola and cello, Op. 40 (1929)

- Simon Rowland-Jones (b. 1950)

Seven Pieces for viola solo (1979)
Wiegenlied Variations for viola and piano (2008); Comus Edition

- Alec Rowley (1892–1958)

Lyric Sonata for cello (or viola) and piano (1929); Stainer & Bell
4 Pieces for viola and piano (1938); J. Williams, London
1. Aubade
2. Scherzo
3. Rêverie
4. Farandole
Rhapsody for viola and orchestra

- Edwin Roxburgh (b. 1937)

Duologue for David for 2 violas (2008); United Music Publishers
Soliloquy 2 for viola solo (2005); United Music Publishers

- Vincent Royer (b. 1961)

Chinook for viola and tape (1995)
Chinook II for violin, viola and tape (1996)
La rivière du silence for violin and viola (2002)
Lumen for viola and electronics (2003)
Préludes à "l'Amour fou", 3 Préludes for mezzo-soprano, viola and piano (2011)

- Miklós Rózsa (1907–1995)

Concerto for viola and orchestra, Op. 37 (1979); Breitkopf & Härtel
Introduction and Allegro for viola solo, Op. 44 (1988); Broude Brothers Limited

- Edmund Rubbra (1901–1986)

Concerto in A minor for viola and orchestra, Op. 75 (1952); Alfred Lengnick
Meditations on a Byzantine Hymn "O quando in cruce" for viola solo, Op. 117 (1962), or for 2 violas, Op. 117a; Alfred Lengnick
Two Sonnets, Diptych for medium voice, viola and piano, Op. 87 (1956); Alfred Lengnick

- Anna Rubin (b. 1946)

Hiding Faces, Open Faces for viola, electronic soundtrack and video (1988); AR New Music Publishers
Viola a Tre for 3 violas (1988); Leisure Planet Music

- Anton Rubinstein (1829–1894)

9 Salon Pieces (9 Салонных пьес) for viola (or violin, or cello) and piano, Op. 11 (1854)
Sonata in F minor for viola and piano, Op. 49 (1855)

- Poul Ruders (b. 1949)

Autumn Collection, 6 Pieces for viola solo (2014); Edition Wilhelm Hansen
Concerto for viola and orchestra (1993–1994, revised 2013); Edition Wilhelm Hansen
Romances, 6 Short Pieces for viola and piano (2011); Edition Wilhelm Hansen

- Witold Rudziński (1913–2004)

Sonata for viola and piano (1946); Polskie Wydawnictwo Muzyczne

- Jeanine Rueff (1922–1999)

Dialogues for viola and piano (1970); Éditions Alphonse Leduc

- Friedrich Wilhelm Rust (1739–1796)

Sonata in C major for viola solo, 2 horns and cello
Sonata in G major for viola solo, 2 horns and cello

- Adolf Ruthardt (1849–1934)

Trio for oboe, viola and piano, Op. 34 (1890)

- John Rutter (b. 1945)

O Lord, Thou Hast Searched Me Out for mixed chorus, solo English horn (or clarinet, or viola) and organ (2007); Oxford University Press

- Peter Ruzicka (b. 1948)

"...den Impuls zum Weitersprechen erst empfinge...", Music for viola and orchestra (1981); Universal Edition

- Jeffrey Ryan (b. 1962)

Bellatrix for viola solo (2001); Canadian Music Centre
Fata Morgana for flute, viola and harp (1998); Canadian Music Centre

- Joseph Ryelandt (1870–1965)

Sonata for viola and piano, Op. 73 (1919); CeBeDeM
