= Atal =

Atal or Attal is a Pashto language word which means Champion or triumph:

- Atal, Astrakhan Oblast, Russia
- Atal Nagar or Nava Raipur, a city and planned capital of Chhattisgarh, India
- Atal Tunnel, a road tunnel being constructed in Himachal Pradesh, India
- As Tall as Lions, an American musical group
  - As Tall as Lions (album), their 2006 album
- Technological and Logistics Directorate, of the Israel Defense Forces
- Atal, a character of the Cthulhu Mythos

== People with the given name ==
- Atal Bihari Vajpayee (1924–2018), Prime Minister of India
- Atal Bihari Panda, Indian actor

== Entertainment ==
- Atal (TV series), an Indian TV series

== People with surname ==
- Bakhtarullah Atal, Afghan cricketer
- Bishnu S. Atal (born 1933), Indian-American researcher
- Hira Lal Atal (1905–1985), Indian general
- Yogesh Atal (1937–2018), Indian sociologist
- Youcef Atal (born 1996), Algerian footballer

== See also ==
- Atal Setu (disambiguation)
- Attal, a surname
- Antal (disambiguation)
