= Andal (disambiguation) =

Andal was a poet-saint of South India.

Andal may also refer to:

- Andal, Paschim Bardhaman, a census town in West Bengal, India
  - Andal (community development block), an administrative division
- Andal (crater), a crater on Mercury
- Andals, a fictional ethnic group in A Song of Ice and Fire book series by George R. R. Martin and the TV series Game of Thrones

== People with the name ==
- Andal Ampatuan (disambiguation)
- Andal Priyadarshini, Tamil poet, lyricist, and writer
- Andal Venkatasubba Rao, Indian educationist
- Dean Andal (born 1959), American public official and businessman

== See also ==
- Antal (disambiguation)
