= Anals =

Anals may refer to:

- Anal scales of a reptile
- Anāl people, an ethnic group of India

== See also ==
- Anal (disambiguation)
- Annals
