= Hollósi =

Hollósi or Hollosi is a surname. Notable people with the surname include:

- Antal Gábor Hollósi (born 1946), Hungarian physician and politician
- Eszter Hollosi, Hungarian-Austrian actress
- Frigyes Hollósi (actor), Hungarian actor
- Frigyes Hollósi (sportsman) (1906–1979), Hungarian swimmer and rower
- Géza Hollósi (1938–2002), Hungarian wrestler
- János Hollósi (1923–????), Hungarian rower
