= Attal =

Attal is a surname stemming from the Arab word "عتال attâl" (porter, i.e. one who carries things). It is associated with the town of Atal in La Coruña, Spain, and is documented since the 17th century as a Jewish surname.

Notable people with the name include:

- Fahed Attal (born 1985), Palestinian football player
- Gabriel Attal (born 1989), French politician, Prime Minister of France from January to September 2024.
- Henri Attal (1936–2003), French actor
- Madeleine Attal (1921–2023), French actress and theatre director
- Yvan Attal (born 1965), Israeli-born French actor and director

== See also ==
- Atal (disambiguation)
- Attali, a surname
