= Antal (surname) =

Family name

Antal is a surname of Hungarian origin.

== Female ==
- Alena Antalová (born 1972), Slovak actress
- Dana Antal (born 1977), Canadian ice hockey player
- Dóra Antal (born 1993), Hungarian water polo player
- Márta Antal-Rudas, known as Márta Rudas (1937–2017), Hungarian javelin athlete
- Veronica Antal (1935–1958), Romanian beatified Catholic

== Male ==
- Botond Antal (born 1991), Hungarian footballer
- Elöd Antal (born 1955), Romanian ice hockey player
- Emese Antal, Romanian speedskater
- Frederick Antal, Hungarian art historian
- Imre Antal (1935–2008), Hungarian entertainer
- István Antal (1896 – 1975), Hungarian politician
- Istvan Antal (ice hockey) (1958–2009), Romanian ice hockey player
- Károly Antal, Hungarian sculptor
- László Antal, Hungarian linguist
- Laszlo Antal (sport shooter) (1936–2010), Hungarian-born sports shooter
- Liviu Antal, (born 1989). Romanian footballer
- Ludovic Antal (1924–1970), Romanian actor and cultural promoter
- Milan Antal, Slovak astronomer
- Nimród Antal, Hungarian-American film director, screenwriter and actor
- Róbert Antal (1921–1995), Hungarian water polo player
- Vratussa Antal, birthname of Anton Vratuša (1915–2017), Slovenian politician and diplomat
- Zoltán Antal (born 1971), Hungarian canoer
- Zsolt Antal (born 1972), Romanian cross-country skier

== See also ==
- Antal (disambiguation)
- Antal (given name)
- Antão, name
