= István Horváth (politician, born 1970) =

Hungarian agrarian engineer and politician

Mayor of Szekszárd
- In office 1 October 2006 – 12 October 2014
- Preceded by: Imre Antal Kocsis
- Succeeded by: Rezső Ács

Member of the National Assembly
- Incumbent
- Assumed office 16 May 2006

Personal details
- Born: 28 February 1970 (age 56) Szekszárd, Hungary
- Party: Fidesz (since 1996)
- Spouse: Anica Nestorovic
- Children: Orsolya; István; Balázs
- Profession: agrarian engineer, politician

István Horváth (born February 28, 1970) is a Hungarian agrarian engineer and politician, member of the National Assembly (MP) from Tolna County Regional List from 2006 to 2010. He represents Szekszárd (Tolna County 1st constituency) since May 14, 2010.

== Career ==
He joined Fidesz in 1996. He became a representative in the Szekszárd Assembly in 1998. Four years later, he could repeat his success. He served as leader of the party's Szekszárd branch between 2002 and 2005.

He was elected to the member of the National Assembly during the 2006 parliamentary election. He was a member of the Committee on Local Government and Regional Development from May 30, 2006, to May 13, 2010. Few months later he was elected mayor of his birthplace in the 2006 local elections, succeeding Imre Antal Kocsis. He served as mayor until the 2014 local elections, replaced by fellow Fidesz member Rezső Ács. Horváth was a member of the Parliamentary Committee on Agriculture from 2010 to 2017.

In May 2013, a leaked audio recording from Szekszárd, surfaced by fellow Fidesz member Ákos Hadházy (who later joined Politics Can Be Different) proved that the ruling right-wing government gave tobacco-sale rights based on party links following the adoption of the controversial law. The Heti Világgazdaság quoted István Horváth who said the most important is that "applicants should be committed conservatives" and the "Socialist supporters must not win".

Horváth was appointed Secretary of State for Coordinating the Development of Town with County Rights under minister without portfolio Lajos Kósa in October 2017. He served in this capacity until May 2018. Thereafter he became a member of the Committee on Budgets.

== Personal life ==
He is married. His wife is Anica Nestorovic. They have a daughter, Orsolya and two sons, István and Balázs.

Political offices
Preceded by Imre Antal Kocsis	Mayor of Szekszárd; 2006–2014	Succeeded by Rezső Ács
