= Anal =

Anal may refer to:

- An adjective related to anus
  - Anal sex, penetration of anus

== Places ==
- Anal Island, an island of the Marshall Islands
- Añal, New Mexico, a ghost town

== Other uses ==
- Anāl people, an ethnic group of northeast India and Myanmar
  - Anāl language, the Sino-Tibetan language they speak
- Ammonal, or ANAL, an explosive made from ammonium nitrate (AN) and aluminium (AL) powder
- All Nippon Air Line, a 2008 boys love manga
- Anal Arasu, Indian fight master/action choreographer

== See also ==
- IANAL, a colloquial acronym for "I am not a lawyer"
- Annals, historical records
- Anala, god in Hinduism
- Annales (disambiguation)
- Annual (disambiguation)
- Antal (disambiguation)
