= Yogesh Atal =

Indian sociologist

Yogesh Atal (9 October 1937 – 13 April 2018) was an Indian sociologist. He held a Ph.D. degree in social anthropology and a D.Sc. (honoris causa).

== Career ==
He joined UNESCO in 1974 and retired in 1997 as Principal Director in Social Sciences. He was honoured by the Maharana Mewar Foundation and the Indian Social Science Association for his contributions to social sciences. The author and editor of a number of books on development related themes, he edited a trilogy of books on Poverty.

After retiring from UNESCO, Atal functioned for a year as Director-General of the Indian Institute of Education, Pune and as Chairman of the Programmes Committee of the Indian Association of Social Science Institutions (IASSI). He was a member of the ICSSR Council and of the Governing Board of the Gobind Vallabh Pant Institute of Social Sciences, Allahabad. He was on the Governing Board of the National Institute of Health and Family Welfare. He served on the High-Powered Committee appointed by the Government of Rajasthan in 2007 to examine the Demand of Gujjars for a Tribal Status.

He also served as Member of the National Advisory Committee for the International Symposium on Human Genomics ISHG 2009, organised by the Anthropological Survey of India in March 2009. Professor Yogesh Atal was Program Advisory Board member at Sunstone Business School and Visiting Professor at the Madhya Pradesh Institute of Social Sciences, Ujjain.

== Books ==
His books include:

- Changing Frontiers of Caste
- Local Communities and National Politics
- Building a Nation
- Social Sciences: the Indian Scene
- MaNDAte for Political Transition
- The Poverty Question : Search for Solutions
- Indian Sociology : From Where to Where – Footnotes to the History of the Discipline
- Understanding the Social Sphere : The Village and Beyond
- Changing Indian Society
- Education and Development
- Entering the Global Village

A Festschrift honouring him was published under the title, Emerging Social Science Concerns (ISBN 81-8069-098-9, edited by Surendra K Gupta).
