= Antal Ruprecht =

Hungarian chemist (1748–1818)

- Anton Leopold von Rupprecht
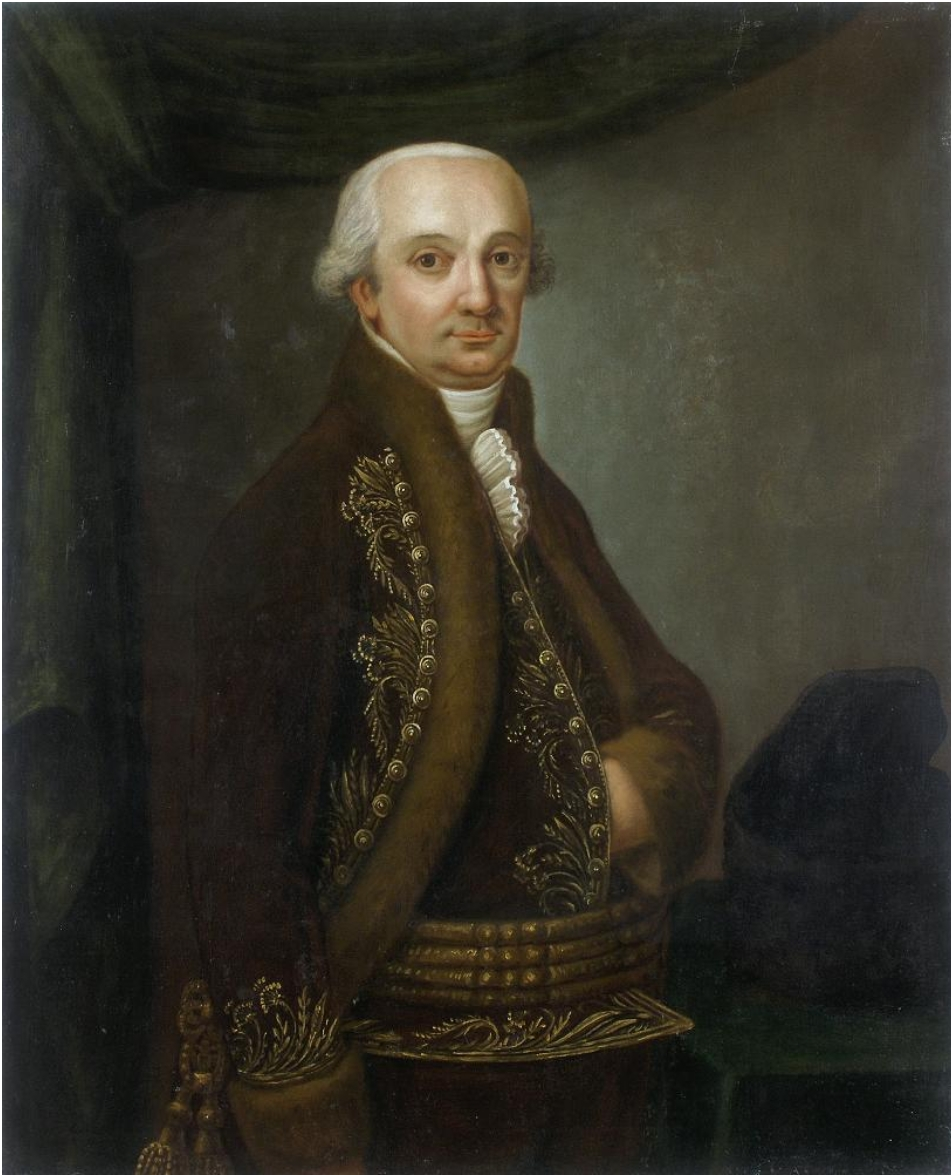
- Portrait, c. 1792
- Born: 1748; Szomolnok, Hungary (today Smolník, Slovakia)
- Died: 1818 (aged 69–70); Vienna, Austria
- Citizenship: Hungarian
- Education: Mining Academy of Selmecbánya/Schemnitz
- Scientific career
- Workplaces: Mining Academy of Selmecbánya/Schemnitz

Antal Ruprecht or Anton Leopold Ruprecht (1748–1818) was a Hungarian chemist. He established a laboratory and conducted analyses of minerals at the Mining Academy of Schemnitz and later at the University of Pavia. He claimed to have found a method for reducing some metal ores but this was claimed by Martin Klaproth to be incorrect.

== Biography ==
Ruprecht was born in Szomolnok, Hungary in 1748 in the family of mining official Frntiška Ignáca. He graduated from the Mining Academy of Selmecbánya with studies under G. A. Scopoli and Ignaz Elder von Born (1742–91). He was sent by the Viennese court chamber in 1774 to study in Freiburg, Germany and at the University of Uppsala in Sweden. He studied under Christlieb Ehregott Gellert, Torbern Olof Bergman and Morten Thrane Esmark. He returned to become a professor of chemistry and metallurgy in 1779 at the Mining Academy and after the death of Scopoli he went to the University of Pavia. He was the first to melt platinum and contributed to the discovery of tellurium in 1784. Ruprecht was the first to theorise that alkaline earth metals were compounds rather than elements; later proved by Humphry Davy. This theory caused some controversy in the chemistry community due to the previous assumption of earths being fundamental substances. Ruprecht worked with Matteo Tondi on efforts to reduce wolfram and molybdenum ores in 1791. He also taught on atmospheric electricity and designed lightning conductors for safety of buildings that stored gunpowder. In 1792 he became councillor of the mining chamber and supreme chief of mining for the Austro-Hungarian empire.
