= Antal Lovas =

Hungarian long-distance runner

Personal information
- Nationality: Hungarian
- Born: 20 December 1884 Kecskemét, Hungary
- Died: 1 March 1970 (aged 85) Budapest, Hungary

Sport
- Sport: Long-distance running

Antal Lovas (20 December 1884 – 1 March 1970) was a Hungarian long-distance runner. He competed at the 1908 and 1924 Summer Olympics, and was also a non-starter at the 1912 Summer Olympics and 1928 Summer Olympics. Lovas was among the first notable Hungarian long-distance runners and had a career that spanned decades, running marathons into his late-60s.
