= Paul Paviour =

English composer, organist and conductor (1931–2024)

Paul Paviour OAM FRCO

Background information
- Born: 14 April 1931; Birmingham, England
- Died: 24 May 2024 (aged 93); Goulburn, New South Wales, Australia
- Occupations: Composer

Paul Paviour OAM FRCO (14 April 1931 – 24 May 2024) was an English composer, organist and conductor based in Australia. He is best known for his contribution to the music of the Anglican Church and composed and adapted at least 471 works in 639 publications.

== Early life ==
Paviour was born in Birmingham, England, on 14 April 1931. He attended Bedford Modern School where he took organ lessons and started writing organ and orchestral compositions. Following his education, Paviour carried out National Service in the Royal Marines and the Royal Navy and then attended the Royal College of Music in London where he worked with Herbert Howells, Adrian Boult and Gordon Jacob. The composer Ralph Vaughan Williams gave Paviour advice on his compositions and they corresponded until Vaughan Williams's death in 1958. The Royal College of Organists awarded Paviour the Harding Prize.

== Career ==
Following his studies Paviour held many positions in the fields of musical education, particularly as organist and Director of Music at Parish Churches and Cathedrals. In 1969 Paviour settled in Australia and took up the position of Director of Music at All Saints' College, Bathurst. In 1975 he became a lecturer in creative composition at the Goulburn Teacher College, which later became Goulburn College of Advanced Education. He was later to become the director of Goulburn Regional Conservatorium.

Paviour's Goulburn Consort of Voices performed for Pope John Paul II in 1982. He was Director of Music for the visit of the Duke of Edinburgh in 1974, the consecration of Bathurst Cathedral in 1971 and the opening by the Queen of the Federal Houses of Parliament in May 1988.

Over sixty years Paviour wrote for nearly all genres and combinations but his particular contribution was to the music of the Anglican Church. As a 'leading authority on hymn tunes and folk tunes' he edited and contributed to several compendiums. Over 150 compositions are in print currently, including seven symphonies, five stage works, five concertos and 30 orchestral works.

== Death ==
Paviour died in Goulburn, New South Wales on 24 May 2024, at the age of 93.

== Honours ==
Paviour was honoured as a Fellow of the Australian Society of Musicology and Composition (F.A.S.M.C.). He received the Medal of the Order of Australia for his contribution to music and the Centenary Medal. He was named the Director of Music Emeritus of Canberra-Goulburn diocese and the Concert Hall of Goulburn Regional Conservatorium is named after him.
