= Antal Zirczy =

Hungarian fencer

Personal information
- Born: 2 February 1898 Budapest, Hungary
- Died: 27 July 1996 (aged 98)

Sport
- Sport: Fencing

Antal Zirczy (2 February 1898 – 27 July 1996) was a Hungarian fencer. He competed in the team foil event at the 1936 Summer Olympics.
