= Antal Bartal =

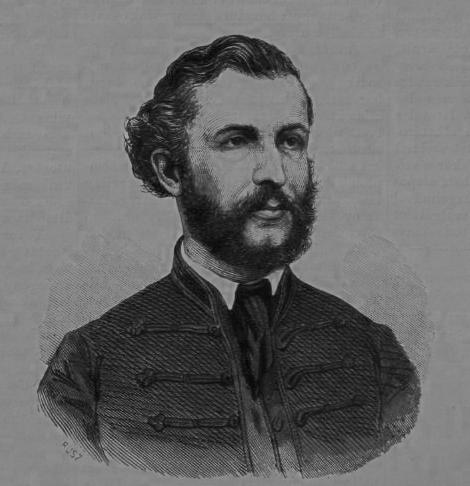
Antal Bartal in 1872

Antal Bartal (Banská Bystrica, 24 April 1829 — Dunaharaszti, 6 September 1909) was a Hungarian lexicographer and philologist. He was a member of the Hungarian Academy of Sciences.

== Life ==
Bartal studied consecutively at the University of Budapest and the University of Vienna. Starting from 1856, he taught in Uzhhorod and in 1858, he became a Latin and Greek teacher at the catholic lyceum of Budapest. From 1871 to 1890, he led a teacher training programme. He was accepted as a correspondent of the Hungarian Academy of Sciences in 1873 and became a full member in 1898. At his retirement in 1890, he received the honorary title of "royal councilor" (királyi tanácsos). He spent the last years of his life in Dunaharaszti.

== Work ==
Bartal co-founded the first Hungarian journal of classical philology, but due to a lack of interest, the journal was only published for two years (from 1870 to 1871). Together with Károly Malmosi, he wrote a number of handbooks for teaching Latin. Furthermore, he was interested in the budding discipline of comparative linguistics, to which he wrote an introduction. Finally, he translated multiple Latin works to Hungarian, including those of Herodotus, Horace, Livy, and Sallust.

Bartal's most famous work is his dictionary of the Latin language as it was used in the Kingdom of Hungary. This dictionary was actively used in the Diet of Hungary, as Latin served as a compromise in the multilingual kingdom.
