= Andal Venkatasubba Rao =

Indian social worker, educationist

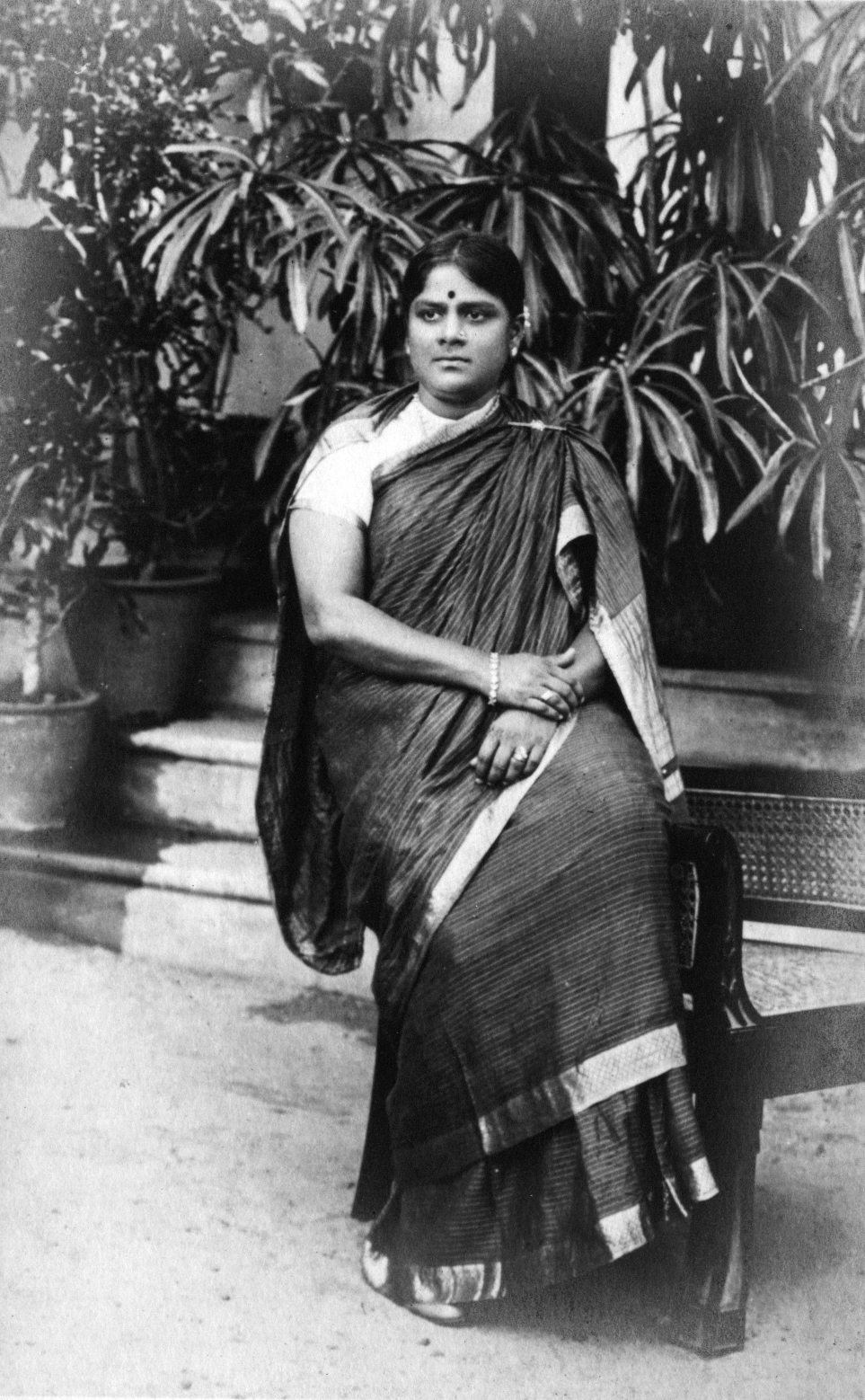
- Born: 1894; Chennai, Madras Presidency, India
- Died: 1969 (aged 74–75); India
- Occupations: Social worker Educationist
- Known for: Madras Seva Sadan
- Spouse: M. Venkatasubba Rao
- Awards: Padma Bhushan

Andal Venkatasubba Rao (1894–1969), popularly known as Aandaalamma, was an Indian social worker, educationist and the co-founder of Madras Seva Sadan, a Chennai-based charitable organization working for the welfare of women and children.

Born in 1894 in Chennai, the capital city of the south Indian state of Tamil Nadu, she did her early schooling at Holy Angels Anglo Indian Higher Secondary School and the Presidency Girls' High School, Madras. In 1928, she married M. Venkatasubba Rao, a judge at Madras High Court who would later be knighted by the British Queen. The couple founded Madras Seva Sadan, a charitable organization, the same year. The organization was started with a capital of ₹ 10,000 to provide for needs of women and children. The Sadan also run a higher secondary school, Lady Andal Venkatasubba Rao Matriculation Higher Secondary School, and a concert hall by name, Sir Mutha Venkatasubba Rao Concert Hall. The Government of India awarded her the third highest civilian honour of the Padma Bhushan, in 1957, for her contributions to society. She died in 1969, at the age of 75.
