= Robert Planel =

French composer

Robert Planel (2 January 1908 – 25 May 1994) was a French composer, music pedagogue and violinist.

== Life ==
Born in Montélimar, Planel was the son of the founder (1903) and director of the music school in Montélimar, Alphonse Planel (1869–1947), who himself, from 1902 to 1947, was conductor of the Harmonie municipale "La Lyre" montilienne and also composer. Planel received violin lessons with René Chédécal, then 1st violinist of the Orchestre de l'Opéra national de Paris. From 1922 to 1933, he studied at the Conservatoire de Paris with, among others, Firmin Touche (1875–1957) (violin), Jean Gallon (1878–1959) (harmony), Georges Caussade (1873–1936) (counterpoint) and with Henri Büsser (1872–1973) and Paul Vidal (1863–1931) (musical composition). During his studies, he worked as a violinist in prominent cinemas in the French capital.

In 1933, he won the prestigious Prix de Rome for his cantata Idylle funambulesque. As a result, he was able to study and work from 1934 to 1936 in Rome at the "Académie de France" in the Villa Medici.

After the Second World War, he was Inspector General of the City of Paris and had great merits for structuring the musical training institutes. From 1972 to 1974, he was one of the co-founders of the urban conservatories of Paris and of the Paris region.

As a composer, he wrote for various genres.

== Compositions ==
=== Works for orchestra ===
- 1936: Divertissement chorégraphique, symphonic poem for orchestra
- 1937: Caprice, concertino for cello and piano with orchestra
- 1938: L'Anniversaire de l’infante, for orchestra
- 1946: Trois pièces de ballet, for orchestra
  1. Les Petites danseuses sévillanes
  2. Menuet
  3. Saltarelle
- 1953-1954: Parade, for orchestra
- 1956: Ballet pour Nanou, for orchestra
- 1966: Concert, for trumpet and string orchestra (dedicated to Maurice André)
- Thème varié, for orchestra

=== Works for wind orchestra ===
- La roche du midi, ouverture
- Marguerite des Prés, fantasy
- Rochecourbière, ouverture
- Scènes villagoises, suite

=== Masses and sacred music ===
- 1932: Pâques romaines, for mixed choir
- 1936: Notre père qui êtes aux cieux, for tenor and organ - in memory of Rolland Gérardin
- 1937-1939: Psaume, for mixed choir and orchestra
- 1993-1994: Psaume, in three movements for tenor solo, mixed choir, organ and orchestra

=== Cantatas ===
- 1933: Idylle funambulesque, cantata for tenor, baritone, soprano and orchestra - after a poem by Paul Arosa
- 1986: La Cantate des Merveilles, cantata for mixed choir

=== Music theatre ===
==== Stage music ====
- 1958 Giboulin et Giboulette, conte musical - lyrics: Jean Planel

=== Works for choir ===
- 1932: Les Chasseresses, for women's choir and piano - lyrics: Jean Royère
- 1935: Menons le cortège funèbre, for mixed choir - lyrics: A. Praviel
- 1935: Saluons la demeure, for women's choir, piano and orchestra - lyrics: A. Prariel
- 1955-1956: Chanson de route, for mixed choir
- 1958: Nous n'irons plus au bois, for mixed choir
- Quatre Noëls, for four equal voices and harp (or piano)
  1. La jambe me fait mal
  2. O douce nuit
  3. Nous étions trois Bergerettes
  4. Et Bon, Bon, Bon
- Ecoutez tous bergers, for mixed choir and piano

=== Vocal music ===
- 1931: Les Biches, for soprano and three female voices (soprano, mezzo-soprano, contralto) and orchestra - lyrics: Anna de Noailles
- 1931: Nymphea, for voice and orchestra
- 1932: Après la tempête, song and fugue based on a theme by Georges Hue
- 1932: Sérénade à Bettine, song for tenor and small orchestra - after a poem by Alfred de Musset
- 1932 Soir, for tenor and piano - lyrics: Albert Samain
- 1933: La Mare, for tenor and piano - lyrics: Théophile Gautier
- 1933 Les Rêves d’amour, for voice and small orchestra - lyrics: F. Beissier
- 1933 Fin de journée, for tenor and orchestra (or piano) - lyrics: Henri de Régnier
- 1935 Quatre mélodies, for soprano and orchestra (or piano)
  1. Le Marchand de sable - lyrics: Jacques Fourcade
  2. Berceuse de la Poupée - lyrics: Tristan Klingsor
  3. Le Fossoyeur
  4. à son page - lyrics: Pierre de Ronsard
- 1936: Adorons cette croix
- 1936: Deux oiseaux
- 1938: Évasion de la jeunesse, five lieder - lyrics: Claude Chardon
  1. Donnez-nous le printemps
  2. La mer
  3. La montagne
  4. Dansons une vaste ronde
  5. Sur le pont de Nantes
- 1947: La Poupée d’Hyde Park, for voices
- A Cassandre, for tenor and piano (or orchestra) - lyrics: Pierre de Ronsard
- Il était un roi, lied - lyrics: Maurice Carême
- Soleil couchant, for voice and orchestra (or piano) - lyrics: José Maria de Heredia

=== Chamber music ===
- 1930: Pièce, for violin and piano
- 1931: Andante et scherzo, trio for oboe, bassoon and piano
- 1932-1935: String quartet
- 1937-1939: Burlesque, for saxophone quartet
- 1944: Prélude et danse, for oboe and piano
- 1944: Suite Romantique, for alto saxophone and piano
  1. Sérénade italienne
  2. Danseuses
  3. Chanson triste
  4. Valse sentimentale
  5. Conte de Noël
  6. Chanson du muletier
- 1950: Air et final, for bass trombone and piano
- 1957: Prelude et Saltarelle, for alto saxophone and piano
- 1958: Caprice, for horn and piano
- 1960: Danse, for percussion and piano
- 1962: A travers champ, for saxophone quartet
- 1963: Fantaisie, for viola and piano
- 1966: Légende, for horn and piano
- 1993-1994: Slow, for flute and piano
- 1994: Vocalise, for clarinet and piano
- Chanson romantique, for oboe and piano
- Comme une sérénade, for oboe and piano
- Diverses pièces, for violin and piano
- Suite Enfantine, for violin and piano
  1. Conte
  2. Valse
  3. Berceuse
  4. Ronde
- Thème, for percussion and piano

=== Pieces for organ ===
- 1970: Epythalame
- 1982: Prélude, Aria et Final about the old name of Montélimar

=== Pieces for piano ===
- 1936: Suite de danses dans le style ancien
  1. Allemande
  2. Courante
  3. Sarabande
  4. Menuet
  5. Rigaudon
  6. Gigue en rondeau
- 1987: Rêverie
- 1988: Viennoiseries, for two four-handed pianos
- 1989: Bagatelles, for piano
  1. Promenade (to Aurélie)
  2. Mélancolie (to Anne-Marie)
  3. Sur la rivière (to Vincent)
  4. Simple histoire (to Hélène)
  5. Gambades (to Béatrice)
- Ballerine

=== Film scores ===
- 1942: Dans le jardin merveilleux
- 1943: Les Métamorphoses de la matière
- 1945: Saut périlleux
- 1946: Amanda

== Bibliography ==
- Wolfgang Suppan, Armin Suppan: Das Neue Lexikon des Blasmusikwesens, 4. Auflage, Freiburg-Tiengen, Blasmusikverlag Schulz GmbH, 1994, ISBN 3-923058-07-1
- Jean-Marie Londeix: Musique pour saxophone, volume II : répertoire général des œuvres et des ouvrages d' enseignement pour le saxophone, Cherry Hill: Roncorp Publications, 1985.
- Nicole Lacombe, Alain Lacombe: Des compositeurs pour l'image - (Cinema et Television), Neuilly sur Seine: Musique et promotion editeur, 1982., 602 p.
