= Imre Antal Kocsis =

Hungarian politician

Mayor of Szekszárd
- In office 25 October 1990 – 1 October 2006
- Succeeded by: István Horváth

Member of the National Assembly
- In office 2 February 1998 – 17 June 1998

Personal details
- Born: 13 July 1948 (age 77) Kiskunhalas, Hungary
- Party: SZDSZ
- Profession: politician

Imre Antal Kocsis (born July 13, 1948) is a Hungarian politician, who served as mayor of Szekszárd between 1990 and 2006.

He was also a member of the National Assembly (MP) from the Alliance of Free Democrats' National List for several months in 1998, when replaced Károly Attila Soós, who resigned on January 1, 1998. After the 1998 parliamentary election, Kocsis lost his mandate.

Political offices
Preceded by first	Mayor of Szekszárd; 1990–2006	Succeeded by István Horváth
