= Annales =

Annals are a concise form of historical writing which record events chronologically, year by year. The equivalent word in Latin and French is annales, which is used untranslated in English in various contexts.

== List of works with titles containing the word "Annales" ==
- Annales (Ennius), an epic poem by Quintus Ennius covering Roman history from the fall of Troy down to the censorship of Cato the Elder
- Annals (Tacitus) Ab excessu divi Augusti "Following the death of the divine Augustus"
- Annales Alamannici, ed. W. Lendi, Untersuchungen zur frühalemannischen Annalistik. Die Murbacher Annalen, mit Edition (Freiburg, 1971)
- Annales Bertiniani, eds. F. Grat, J. Vielliard, S. Clemencet and L. Levillain, Annales de Saint-Bertin (Paris, 1964)
- Annales du Muséum national d'histoire naturelle, Paris, France. Published 1802 to 1813, then became the Mémoires then the Nouvelles Annales
- Annales Fuldenses, ed. F. Kurze, Monumenta Germaniae Historica SRG (Hanover, 1891)
- Annales. Histoire, Sciences Sociales, a French academic journal covering social history
- Annales regni Francorum, ed. F. Kurze, MGH SRG (Hanover, 1895)
- Annales Iuvavenses, ed. H. Bresslau, MGH SS (vol. 30, Hanover, 1926), pp. 727–44
- Annales Vedastini, ed. B. vonSimson
- Annales Xantenses et Annales Vedastini, MGH SRG (Hanover, 1909)
- Annales of Granius Licinianus

== Journal and school ==
- Annales School, a school of historical writing named after its journal, the Annales d'histoire économique et sociale

== See also ==
- Annales Maximi
- Annals
