= Antal =

Antal may refer to:

- Andal, 8th-century poet saint of South India
- Antal (given name)
- Antal (surname)
- 6717 Antal, a minor planet

== See also ==
- Andal (disambiguation)
- Atal (disambiguation)
