= Antal Berkes =

Hungarian painter

- Born: Antal Berkes; 1874; Budapest, Hungary
- Died: 1938 (aged 63–64); Budapest, Hungary
- Known for: Painting

Antal Berkes (1874–1938) was a Hungarian painter, born in Budapest, Hungary. He lived in Paris for some time and produced cityscapes there as well as similar street scenes of Budapest and Vienna.

== Early career ==
Berkes studied at the Academy of Fine Arts between 1889 and 1894 in Budapest, Hungary. He first started painting landscapes, and later changed to painting street scenes of Budapest. His popularity and sales increased so he started "mass producing" many of his works, meeting the requirements of the art dealers of his age. His work went through light and dark periods as he experimented with light.

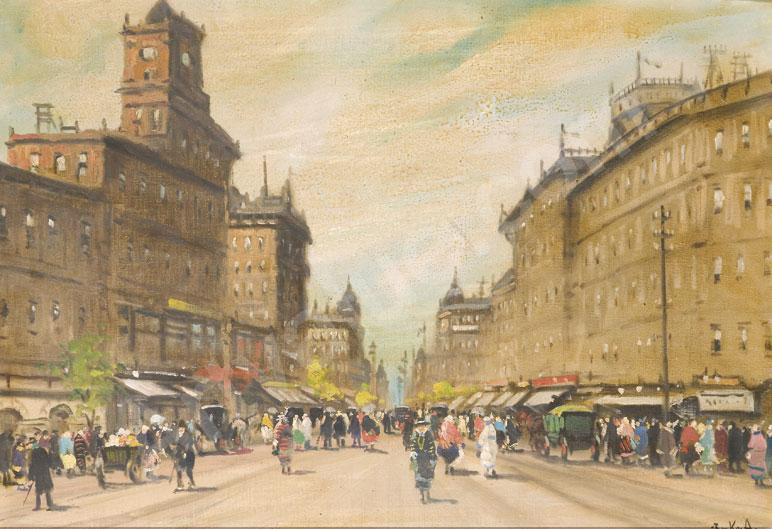
Antal Berkes Foutca

== Modern exhibition ==
His paintings were showcased at the Ottó Herman Museum in the exhibition entitled "Paris through the eyes of a Hungarian". The display was organized by the RadaR - European Contemporary Art Association. The exhibition was accompanied by the Miskolc Opera Festival entitled Bartok + Paris 2007.
