= Mauricio Rodríguez (composer) =

Mexican composer

Mauricio Rodríguez (Mexico City, 1976) is a Mexican-American composer.

He holds a Doctor of Musical Arts degree in Composition granted by Stanford University, where he worked with Brian Ferneyhough as advisor. He earned the bachelor's degree in composition and the master's degree in Sonology at the Royal Conservatory of The Hague in the Netherlands, where he studied with Clarence Barlow (composition), Konrad Bohemer (electronic music) and Paul Berg (computer programming). Formerly he also studied composition, piano and ethnomusicology at the Laboratory of Musical Creation led by Julio Estrada at the National School of Music (UNAM).

His musical writing is influenced by processes of graphical representation, by a multi-parametric conception of sound and musical structure, intuitive-based algorithmic processes and experimentation as a fundamental method of construction. His musical output includes acoustic, electronic, and multi-media works.

== Publications ==
Rodríguez, Mauricio (editor). 2020. Musicians' Migratory Patterns: American-Mexican Border Lands. London: Routledge. ISBN 9780367498160

== Sources ==
Terrazas, Wilfrido. 2009. “Islas B: Mauricio Rodríguez” (interview). Revista electrónica Redes Música, 4(5).
