= Atal Setu =

Atal Setu may refer to several bridges in India named after the 10th Prime Minister of India Atal Bihari Vajpayee:

- Atal Setu, Goa (formerly Third Mandovi bridge)
- Atal Setu, Jammu and Kashmir
- Atal Setu, Sikkim
- Mumbai Trans Harbour Link, officially Shri Atal Bihari Vajpayee Trans Harbour Link or Atal Setu
- Atal Pedestrian Bridge, Ahmedabad.
