= Andal Ampatuan =

Andal Ampatuan is the name of:

- Andal Ampatuan Sr. (1941–2015), Filipino politician, former governor of Maguindanao
- Andal Ampatuan Jr. (born 1976), Filipino politician, former mayor of Datu Unsay, Maguindanao, and prime suspect in the Maguindanao massacre
