= Attali =

Attali (Hebrew: אטָּלי או אטָּאלי) is a Jewish surname originated from the Arab word "عتال attâl" (porter). Notable people with the surname include:

- Bernard Attali (born 1943), French businessman
- Charley Attali (born 1930), French-Israeli aerospace engineer
- Jacques Attali (born 1943), Algerian-French economist and scholar
