= Antal Csengery =

Antal Csengery Csengery Antal
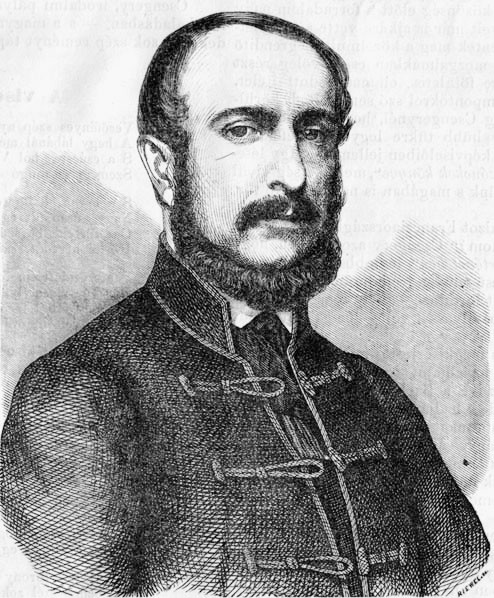
- Born: June 2, 1822; Nagyvárad (now Oradea, Romania)
- Died: July 13, 1880 (aged 58); Budapest

Antal Csengery (June 2, 1822 – July 13, 1880), Hungarian publicist, and a historical writer of great influence on his time.

== Life ==
He was born at Nagyvárad, Kingdom of Hungary, Austrian Empire (now Oradea, Romania). He took, at an early date, a very active part in the literary and political movements immediately preceding the Hungarian Revolution of 1848. He and Baron Sigismund Kemny may be considered as the two founders of high-class Magyar journalism.

After 1867 the greatest of modern Hungarian statesmen, Ferenc Deák, attached Csengery to his personal service, and many of the momentous state documents inspired or suggested by Deák were drawn up by Csengery. In that manner his influence, as represented by the text of many a statute regulating the relations between Austria and Hungary, is one of an abiding character.

As a historical writer he excelled chiefly in brilliant and thoughtful essays on the leading political personalities of his time, such as Paul Nagy, Bertalan Szemere and others. He also commenced a translation of Macaulay's History. He died at Budapest on July 13, 1880.
