= Atal, Astrakhan Oblast =

Atal Атал
- Selo
- Location within Astrakhan Oblast Location within Russia
- Coordinates: 46°11′N 48°01′E
- Country: Russia
- Region: Astrakhan Oblast
- District: Privolzhsky District
- Time zone: UTC+4:00

Atal (Russian: Атал, Turkmen: Atal) is a rural locality (a selo) in Yaksatovsky Selsoviet, Privolzhsky District, Astrakhan Oblast, Russia. The population was 643 as of 2010. There are 36 streets.

== Geography ==
Atal is located on the Kizan River, 37 km southwest of Nachalovo (the district's administrative centre) by road. Nartovsky is the nearest rural locality.
