= Vivienne Olive =

British-German composer and music educator

Vivienne Olive (born 31 May 1950) is a British-German composer and music educator.

== Career ==
Born in London, Vivienne Olive studied piano, harpsichord, organ and music theory at Trinity College of Music in London. After 1968, she continued her education at the University of York, where she graduated in composition in 1975. Her teachers included the composers Bernard Rands (York 1971–1972), Franco Donatoni (Milan, 1972–1974), Roman Haubenstock-Ramati (Vienna, 1974–1975) and Klaus Huber (University of Music Freiburg 1975–1978, where she also studied harpsichord with Stanislav Heller). She received her Ph.D. in composition from the University of York in 1975. She was awarded composition grants from the Department of Education and Science (1971–1974) and the German Academic Exchange Service (1975–1978).

In 1979, Olive became a lecturer in music theory and composition at the Nuremberg Meistersinger Conservatory (now the College of Music Nuremberg). In 1980 she co-founded the Days of New Music in Nuremberg. In 1995, she became a board member of the International Working Women and Music. From 1993 until 1995 she taught at the University of Ballarat and the James Cook University in Australia and in 2005 she became Composer in Residence at Bundanon, New South Wales.
