= Antal Ribáry =

Hungarian composer

- Born: Antal Ridler; 8 January 1924; Budapest, Hungary
- Died: 24 April 1992 (aged 68); Budapest, Hungary
- Era: 20th century

Antal Ribáry (often used: Ribári, born: Ridler, 8 January 1924 – 24 April 1992) was a Hungarian composer.

== Life ==
Ribáry studied at the Franz Liszt Academy of Music between 1943 and 1947, studying composition with Ferenc Szabó, a later rector. In 1959, the Hungarian State Opera presented the one-act comic opera The Divorce of King Louis based on the drama by Sándor Bródy.

== Selected works ==
- Lajos király váilk (The Divorce of King Louis), comic opera in 1 act (1959)
- Ligeti tragédia (Ligeti Tragedy), opera in 2 acts
- Liliom, opera (1960)
- Symphony No. 1 (1960)
- Symphony No. 2 (1964)
- Symphony No. 3 for brass, timpani and strings (1970)
- Symphony No. 4 Elegy (1980)
- Cello Concerto No. 1 (1958)
- Cello Concerto No. 2 (1977)
- Violin Concertino (1965)
- Violin Concerto (1987)
- Dialoghi (Dialogues) for viola and orchestra (1967)
- Sonata for viola and piano (1958)

== Discography ==
- The Music of Antal Ribári (LP, Serenus, New York, 1969, feat.: Erika Sziklay (soprano), Géza Oberfrank (cond.), László Mező (cello), Miklós Erdélyi (cond.), Erzsébet Komlóssy (alto), Ferenc Szőnyi (tenor), Ervin Lukács (cond.), Hungarian Radio Symphonic Orchestra, Tátrai String Quartet, Hungarian Radio Choir)
