= Antal Gábor Hollósi =

Hungarian politician

Member of the National Assembly
- In office 14 May 2010 – 5 May 2014

Personal details
- Born: August 1946 (age 79) Budapest, Hungary
- Party: Fidesz
- Profession: physician, politician

Dr. Antal Gábor Hollósi (born August 1946) is a Hungarian physician and politician, member of the National Assembly (MP) for Újpest (Budapest Constituency V) between 2010 and 2014. He was defeated by Péter Kiss in the 2014 parliamentary election, and by Imre Horváth during the 2015 by-election in Újpest.

Hollósi was a member of the Committee on Health from May 14, 2010 to May 5, 2014.
