= Bassoon repertoire =

Set of available musical works for bassoon

The bassoon repertoire consists of pieces of music composed for bassoon as a principal instrument that may be performed with or without other instruments. Below is a non-exhaustive list of major works for the bassoon.

== Baroque ==
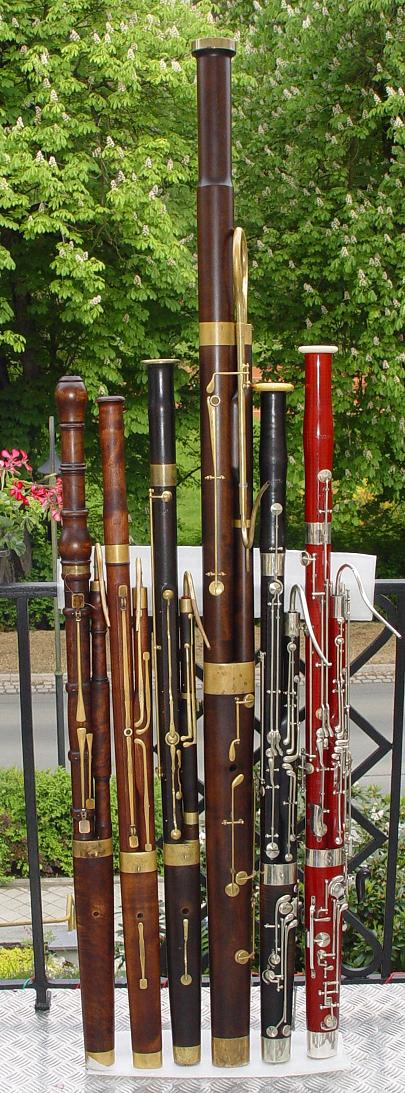
A collection of historical bassoons, from early baroque to modern, including a classical contrabassoon.

Bassoon Concerto
First movement of Mozart's Bassoon Concerto

Excerpt from the first movement of Beethoven's Fourth Symphony
Bassoon performance from Beethoven's 4th Symphony

Scherzo alla Mazurka ("Dance in the village pub")
The fourth of Julius Weissenborn's 6 Trios for 3 Bassoons Op. 4

Scheherezade
Bassoon solo from Nikolai Rimsky-Korsakov's Scheherazade

Bassoon Sonata, Op. 168
Bassoon Sonata with piano accompaniment, composed by Camille Saint-Saëns

- Michel Corrette: Concerto for 4 bassoons and continuo 'Le Phenix'
- Johann Friedrich Fasch: Several bassoon concerti; the best known is in C major
- Christoph Graupner: Four bassoon concerti
- Johann Wilhelm Hertel: Bassoon Concerto in A minor
- Georg Philipp Telemann: Sonata in F minor
- Antonio Vivaldi: 39 concerti for bassoon, 37 of which exist in their entirety today
- Jan Dismas Zelenka: Six trio sonatas for two oboes (or oboe/violin), bassoon and basso continuo

== Classical ==
- Johann Christian Bach:
  - Bassoon Concerto in B♭
  - Bassoon Concerto in E♭ major
- Franz Danzi:
  - Bassoon Concerto in G minor,
  - Bassoon Concerto in C
  - 2 Bassoon Concerto in F major
  - 3 Quartets for Bassoon and Strings, Op. 40
- François Devienne:
  - 12 Sonatas (six with opus numbers)
  - 3 Quartets
  - 4 Bassoon Concerti
  - 6 Duos Concertants
- Johann Nepomuk Hummel: Grand Concerto for Bassoon (in F)
- Leopold Kozeluch:
  - Bassoon Concerto in B♭ major (P V:B1)
  - Bassoon Concerto in C major (P V:C1)
- Wolfgang Amadeus Mozart:
  - Bassoon Concerto in B♭, K. 191, the only surviving of the original three bassoon concertos he wrote
  - Sonata for Bassoon and Cello in B♭, K. 292
- Antonio Rosetti:
  - Bassoon Concertos in F major (Murray C75)
  - Bassoon Concertos in B♭ major (Murray C69, C73, C74)
  - Bassoon Concerto in E♭ major (Murray C68)
- Carl Stamitz: Bassoon Concerto in F major
- Johann Baptist Wanhal:
  - Bassoon Concerto in C major
  - Concerto in F major for two bassoons and orchestra

== Romantic ==
- Franz Berwald: Konzertstück
- Ferdinand David: Concertino for bassoon and orchestra, op. 12
- Edward Elgar: Romance for bassoon and orchestra, op. 62
- Johann Nepomuk Fuchs: Bassoon Concerto in B♭ major
- Julius Fučík: Der alte Brummbär ("The Old Grumbler") for bassoon and orchestra, op. 210
- Reinhold Glière: Humoresque and Impromptu for Bassoon and Piano, op. 35, nos. 8 and 9
- Gioachino Rossini: Bassoon Concerto (attributed to Rossini, authenticity questionable)
- Camille Saint-Saëns: Sonata for bassoon and piano in G major, op. 168
- Carl Maria von Weber:
  - Andante e rondo ungarese in C minor, op. 35b
  - Bassoon Concerto in F, op. 75

== Twentieth century ==
- Miguel del Aguila:
  - Hexen for bassoon and string orchestra
  - Hexen for bassoon and piano
- Luciano Berio: Sequenza XII for solo bassoon (1995)
- Pierre Boulez: Dialogue de l'ombre double for bassoon and electronics (originally for clarinet, transcribed for bassoon by the composer – 1995)
- Howard J. Buss: A Day in the City for solo bassoon (1986)
  - Time Capsule for oboe and bassoon (1996)
  - Desert Odyssey for clarinet, bassoon and piano (1997)
- Peter Maxwell Davies: Strathclyde Concerto no.8 for bassoon and orchestra
- Edison Denisov
  - Cinq Etudes for bassoon (1983)
  - Sonata for solo bassoon (1982)
- Franco Donatoni: Concerto for bassoon (1952)
- Henri Dutilleux:
  - Sarabande et Cortège for bassoon and piano (1942)
  - Regards sur l'Infini and Deux sonnets de Jean Cassou for bassoon and piano (originally for voice and piano, transcribed by Pascal Gallois with the composer's approval) (1942/2011 and 1954/2011)
- Alvin Etler: Sonata for bassoon and piano (1951)
- Jean Françaix:
  - Quadruple Concerto for flute, oboe, clarinet, bassoon and orchestra (1935)
  - Divertissement for bassoon and string quintet (or orchestra) (1942)
  - Le coq et le renard (The Rooster and the Fox) for 4 bassoons (1963)
  - Sept impromptus for flute and bassoon (1977)
  - Trio for oboe, bassoon and piano (1994)
  - Two pieces for bassoon and piano (1996)
- Glenn Gould: Sonata for Bassoon and Piano (1950)
- Sofia Gubaidulina:
  - Concerto for bassoon and low strings (1975)
  - Duo sonata for two bassoons (1977)
- Mozart Camargo Guarnieri:
  - Choro for bassoon and orchestra (1991)
- César Guerra-Peixe
  - Three pieces for bassoon and piano (1944)
  - Duo for clarinet and bassoon (1970)
- Paul Hindemith:
  - Sonata for bassoon and piano (1938)
  - Four pieces for cello and bassoon (1941)
  - Concerto for trumpet, bassoon and orchestra (1949)
  - Concerto for flute, oboe, clarinet, bassoon, harp and orchestra (1949)
- Bertold Hummel:
  - Concertino for bassoon and strings, Op. 27b (1964/1992)
  - 5 Epigrams for bassoon solo Op. 51 (1973)
  - Divertimento for bassoon and violoncello, Op. 62 (1978)
- Gordon Jacob:
  - Concerto for bassoon, strings and percussion
  - Four Sketches for bassoon
  - Partita for bassoon
- Paul Jeanjean: Prelude and Scherzo for bassoon and piano (1911)
- André Jolivet:
  - Concerto for bassoon, strings, harp and piano (1954)
  - Pastorales de Noël for flute, bassoon and harp (1943)
- Lev Knipper: Concerto for bassoon and strings (1969)
- Charles Koechlin:
  - Three pieces for bassoon and piano, Op. 18 (1899–1907)
  - Sonata for bassoon and piano, Op.71 (1918)
  - Silhouettes de comédie, 12 pieces for bassoon and orchestra, Op. 193 (1942–1943)
- György Kurtág: Játékok és üzenetek for solo bassoon (1986–2001)
- Libby Larsen: Jazz Variations for Solo Bassoon (1977)
- Mary Jane Leach: Feu de Joie for solo bassoon and six taped bassoons (1992)
- Anne LeBaron: After a Dammit to Hell for bassoon solo (1982)
- Jef Maes: Burlesque for bassoon and piano (1957)
- Francisco Mignone:
  - Concertino for bassoon and orchestra (1957)
  - Double Bassoon Sonata no. 1 (1961)
  - Sonatina for bassoon (1961)
  - Invention for clarinet and bassoon (1961)
  - Invention for flute and bassoon (1961)
  - Double Bassoon Sonata no. 2 "Ubayera e Ubayara" (1966)
  - "Tetrafonia e variações em busca de um tema" for four bassoons (1967)
  - "Non nova, sed nove" for oboe, clarinet and bassoon (1967)
  - Passacaglia for clarinet and bassoon (1968)
  - Four symphonies for oboe, clarinet and bassoon (1968)
  - "Sonata a 3" for three bassoons (1978)
  - "3rd Égloga" oboe, clarinet and bassoon (1978)
  - 16 valses for bassoon (1979–1981)
  - Concertino for clarinet, bassoon and orchestra (1980)
  - Four Brazilian pieces for four bassoons (1983)
  - Seresta for bassoon and orchestra (1983)
- Ștefan Niculescu
  - Sincronie III for flute, oboe and bassoon (1985)
  - "Monophonie", sonata for bassoon (and voice ad libitum) (1989)
- Willson Osborne: Rhapsody for bassoon
- Andrzej Panufnik: Concerto for bassoon and small orchestra (1985)
- Francis Poulenc:
  - Trio for oboe, bassoon and piano (1926)
  - Sonata for clarinet and bassoon (1922)
- Sergei Prokofiev: Humoristic Scherzo for four bassoons, Op. 12b (1915)
- Einojuhani Rautavaara: Bassoon Sonata (1970)
- Alan Ridout: Concertino for bassoon and strings (1975)
- Timothy Salter:
  - Monopolies for solo bassoon (1995)
  - Imprints for bassoon and piano (1997)
- Claudio Santoro:
  - Duo for bassoon and piano (1982)
  - Fantasia Sul América for solo bassoon (1983)
- Alexander Shchetynsky
  - Lento pensieroso for solo bassoon (1994)
- Richard Strauss:
  - Duett-Concertino in F major for clarinet and bassoon with string orchestra and harp, TRV 293, AV 147 (1947)
  - Der Zweikampf in B♭ major, polonaise for flute, bassoon and orchestra, TRV 133, AV 82 (1884)
- Lubos Sluka: Sonata for Bassoon and Piano (1971)
- Stjepan Šulek: Concerto for bassoon and orchestra
- Alexandre Tansman:
  - Sonatine for bassoon and piano
  - Suite for bassoon and piano
- Heitor Villa-Lobos:
  - Trio for oboe, clarinet and bassoon (1921)
  - Ciranda das sete notas for bassoon and string orchestra (1933)
  - Bachianas Brasileiras no. 6 for flute and bassoon
  - Fantasia concertante for clarinet, bassoon and piano (1953)
  - Duo for oboe and bassoon (1957)
- John Williams: The Five Sacred Trees: Concerto for bassoon and orchestra (1995)
- Ermanno Wolf-Ferrari: Suite-concertino for bassoon and chamber orchestra (1933)
- Isang Yun: Monolog for bassoon solo (1983–1984)
- Ellen Taaffe Zwilich: Concerto for bassoon and orchestra (1992)

== Twenty-first century ==
- Miguel del Aguila
  - Sunset Song for bassoon and piano
  - Nostalgica for bassoon and string quartet
  - Malambo for bassoon and string quartet (also with quintet and string orchestra)
  - Malambo for bassoon and piano; Tango Trio for bassoon clarinet and piano; or bassoon, oboe and piano
- Nimrod Borenstein: Concerto for bassoon and string orchestra opus 56a (2012)
- Howard J. Buss
  - Aquarius for 3 bassoons (2013)
  - Ballad for bassoon and piano (2004)
  - Behind the Invisible Mask for bassoon and one percussion (2004)
  - Bassoonisms for four bassoons (2020)
  - Concerto for Bassoon and Orchestra (2022)
  - Concerto for Bassoon for bassoon and piano (2017)
  - Contrasts in Blue for oboe, bassoon and piano (2000)
  - Emanations for two bassoons and drum set (2016)
  - The Enchanted Garden for bassoon and string trio (2016)
  - Fables from Aesop for bassoon and violin (2002)
  - Four Miniatures for two bassoons (2010)
  - The Heavens Awaken for bassoon and string quartet (2008)
  - Island of Enchantment for flute, clarinet, horn, bassoon, and piano (2023)
  - Levi's Dream for bassoon quartet (2011)
  - Luminous Horizons for bassoon and harp (2016)
  - Prelude and Intrada for bassoon quartet or ensemble (2007)
  - Spring Reverie for viola, cello and bassoon (2023)
  - Trio Lyrique for horn, bassoon and piano (2013)
  - Turbulent Times for flute, bassoon and piano
  - Village Scenes for oboe, clarinet and bassoon (2004)
- Shai Cohen: Treatise for Bassoon and diffused electronics (2019)
- Eric Ewazen: Concerto for Bassoon and Wind Ensemble (2002)
- Gala Flagello: Mother Time, Father Nature for bassoon and piano (2021); Enough for bassoon, violin, piano, and percussion (2018)
- Dai Fujikura
  - The Spirit of Beings for bassoon and electronics (2012/2025)
  - Calling for bassoon (2011)
  - Following for bassoon (2013)
  - secret leaves for bassoon (2011/2019)
- Karel Janovický: Duos for violin and bassoon, No 1 (2004), No 2 (2006); Sonata for bassoon and piano (2005); Bassoon Quartet (2013).
- Libby Larsen: Concert Piece for Bassoon and Piano (2008), Full Moon in the City (2013)
- Lior Navok: Ex Silentium for bassoon and piano (2018)
- Patrick Nunn: Gonk for Bassoon and Sound File (2004)
- Fabio Mengozzi: Vision for English horn, Bassoon and piano (2020)
- Robert Paterson: Sonata for Bassoon and Piano (2001); Elegy for Two Bassoons and Piano (2006–07)
- Wolfgang Rihm: Psalmus for bassoon and orchestra (2007)
- Aaron Robinson: Sonatina for Bassoon and Piano (2013); Petite Suite for bassoon trio (2014)
- Ananda Sukarlan: Communication Breakdown for flute, bassoon and piano (2017), A Curious Coincidence of a Tune Appearance in Austria & Scotland in the Night-Time for violin, bassoon and piano (2026)
- Graham Waterhouse: Basson Quintet (2003); Bright Angel for three bassoons and contrabassoon (2008)

== Works featuring prominent bassoon passages ==
- Johann Sebastian Bach: many bassoon passages, including: BWV 155 (Du mußt glauben, du mußt hoffen) and BWV 149 (Seid wachsam, Ihr heiligen Wächter).
- Béla Bartók: Concerto for Orchestra; the second movement features woodwind instruments in pairs, beginning with the bassoons, and the recapitulation of their duet adds a third instrument playing a staccato counter-melody.
- Ludwig van Beethoven: Symphony No. 4 in B♭ major, fourth movement; Symphony 9 in D minor: fourth movement: --after the 24-measure exposition of the Ode to Joy (Allegro assai), the first bassoon enters with a prominent counter-melody for the next 24 measures; and continues a solo to add emphasis to the theme.
- Hector Berlioz: Symphonie fantastique. In the fourth movement, there are several solo and tutti bassoon passages. This piece calls for four bassoons.
- Georges Bizet: Carmen, Entr'acte to Act II features two bassoons initially in unison to the tune of "Dragons d'Alcala" from the opera.
- Benjamin Britten: The Young Person's Guide to the Orchestra, Variation D features the bassoons.
- Emmanuel Chabrier: España, four bassoons in unison play a Spanish tune.
- Frédéric Chopin: "Piano Concerto No. 2 (Chopin)", measures 82, etc. of the Larghetto feature a sublime moment for the bassoon.
- Michael Daugherty: Alligator Alley features bassoon solos at the beginning and lively melody through the whole piece.
- Gaetano Donizetti: Una furtiva lagrima, from the Italian opera, L'elisir d'amore, opens with a solo bassoon passage.
- Paul Dukas: The Sorcerer's Apprentice, widely recognized as used in the film Fantasia; the main melody is first heard in a famous bassoon solo passage.
- Manuel de Falla: The Three-cornered Hat, where the bassoon represents El corregidor (the magistrate).
- Edvard Grieg: In the Hall of the Mountain King.
- Georg Friedrich Handel: many bassoon passages: including: "Ariodante": "Scherza infida" (with mournful bassoon obbligato); and "Amadigi": "Pena tiranna."
- Franz Josef Haydn: The Creation: "Holde Gattin"; and Symphony No. 68.
- W A Mozart: many, for example, "Symphony No. 41 (Mozart)", as mentioned above; "Great Mass in C minor, K. 427", in the Et incarnatus est, the bassoon is one of three obligato soloists to accompany the soprano.
- Modest Mussorgsky: Pictures at an Exhibition as orchestrated by Maurice Ravel; particularly "Promenade II", "Il Vecchio Castello", and "Ballet of the Chicks in Their Shells". A brief solo appears in the second part of "The Hut on the Fowl's Legs: Baba Yaga"
- Carl Nielsen: Symphony No. 5, the main theme of the first movement is introduced by a pair of bassoons.
- Carl Orff: Carmina Burana, the 12th movement, "Olim lacus colueram", opens with a high bassoon solo.
- Krzysztof Penderecki: Symphony no. 4 "Adagio", a long solo passage followed by strings in the background appears in the middle of the symphony.
- Sergei Prokofiev: Peter and the Wolf, the theme of the grandfather; Piano Concerto No.3 in C major Op.26, third movement, bassoon and cellos play the theme in staccato and pizzicato; Violin Concerto No. 1, third movement, a playful theme similar to the main theme gets introduced by the bassoon at the beginning of the movement before the solo violin comes in
- Jean-Philippe Rameau: "Entrée de Polymnie", from the Act IV of his posthumous opera Les Boréades
- Maurice Ravel: Rapsodie espagnole, features a fast, lengthy dual cadenza at the end of the first movement; Boléro, the bassoon has a high descending solo passage near the beginning; Piano Concerto in G Major; Piano Concerto in D Major (for the left hand), prominent use of contrabassoon in the opening; Ma mère l'oye a contrabassoon solo in the fourth part; Alborada del gracioso, solo after the theme, a long solo.
- Ottorino Respighi: "Trittico Botticelliano", the second movement, L'Adorazione dei Magi, opens with a bassoon solo which transitions into an oboe/bassoon duet - the bassoon appears solo later in the movement also in a different figure.
- Nikolai Rimsky-Korsakov: Scheherazade, second movement: "Tale of the Kalendar Prince"
- Dmitri Shostakovich: Several symphonies including No. 1, No. 4, No. 5, No. 7 "Leningrad" first movement, No. 8, and No. 9 (4th to 5th movement, one of the biggest bassoon solos in the symphonic repertoire), No. 10, No. 15.
- Jean Sibelius: Symphony 2 in D minor, second movement opening—bassoons play in octaves; Symphony 5 in E♭ major.
- Igor Stravinsky: The Rite of Spring, opens with a famously unorthodox bassoon solo; The Firebird, "Berceuse"; "Infernal Dance" with contrabassoon, horns, trombone, tuba; Pulcinella Suite.
- Silvestre Revueltas: Sensemayá, prominently features a solo bassoon playing an ostinato that represents the syllabic rhythm of the poem on which the piece is based, also named Sensemayá by Nicolás Guillén.
- Pyotr Ilyich Tchaikovsky: Symphony 4 in F minor, Symphony 5 in E minor, Symphony 6 in B minor.
- Giuseppe Verdi : La donna è mobile, from the opera Rigoletto, bassoon plays the theme on the end of the aria; Messa da Requiem, 1st bassoon has an extended passage which begins solo but then accompanies the soprano, mezzo and tenor in the Quid sum miser section of the Dies Irae.

== See also ==
- Bassoon concerto
- Bassoon sonata
