= Bassoon concerto =

Instrumental composition

Mozart's Bassoon Concerto in B♭ major, K. 191/186e: III. Rondo: Tempo di menuetto

A bassoon concerto is a concerto for bassoon accompanied by a musical ensemble, typically orchestra. Like bassoon sonatas, bassoon concerti were relatively uncommon until the twentieth century, although there are quite a few bassoon concerti from the Classical period. Some contemporary bassoon concerti are scored for solo bassoon and wind or string orchestras.

== Baroque ==
- Antonio Vivaldi: 39 Bassoon Concerti, RV 466-504 (RV 468 and 482 incomplete)
- Johann Friedrich Fasch: Concerto in C major
- Caspar Förster: Concerto
- Johann Gottlieb Graun: Concerto in C major
- Christoph Graupner: Four Bassoon Concerti in C major, GWV 301, C minor, GWV 307, G major, GWV 328, and B♭ major, GWV 340
- Johann Wilhelm Hertel: Bassoon Concerti in A minor, B♭ major and E♭ major
- František Jiránek: Bassoon Concerti in G minor and F major
- Antonín Jiránek: Four Bassoon Concerti
- Henrik Philip Johnsen, Concerto for Two Bassoons in G major (1751)
- Johann Melchior Molter: Four Bassoon Concerti (including Concerto in B♭ major, MWV 6.35)
- Antonín Reichenauer: Three Bassoon Concerti in C major, F major, and G minor
- Michel Corrette: Concerto in D major Le Phénix for four bassoons and continuo

== Classical ==
- Johann Christian Bach: Two Bassoon Concerti in E♭ major (W C82) and B♭ major (W C83)
- Capel Bond: Bassoon Concerto No. 6 in B♭ major (1766)
- Bernhard Henrik Crusell: Bassoon Concertino in B♭ major
- Franz Danzi: Four Bassoon Concerti in F major (2), C major and G minor
- François Devienne: Five Bassoon Concerti (1785)
- Luigi Gatti: Bassoon Concerto in F major, L7:e4
- Johann Nepomuk Hummel: Bassoon Concerto in F major, S. 63/WoO 23
- Leopold Kozeluch: Two Bassoon Concerti in B♭ major, P V:B1 and C major, P V:C1
- Wolfgang Amadeus Mozart: Bassoon Concerto (1774)
- Johann Baptist Georg Neruda: Concerto in C major
- Ignaz Joseph Pleyel: Concerto in B♭ major B.107
- Johann Heinrich Christian Rinck: Concerto
- Antonio Rosetti: Bassoon Concerti (C69, C73-C75)
- Theodor von Schacht: Concerto
- Carl Stamitz: Bassoon Concerto in F major
- Johann Baptist Wanhal: Bassoon Concerto in C major, Concerto for Two Bassoons and Orchestra
- Anselm Viola i Valentí: Concerto in F major (1791)
- Johann Christoph Vogel: Concerto in C major

== Romantic ==
- Ferdinand David: Concertino, Op. 12 (1838)
- Édouard Du Puy: Concerto in C minor (also, Bassoon Quintet in A minor, often performed as a concerto)
- Johann Nepomuk Fuchs: Concerto in B♭ major
- Peter Josef von Lindpaintner: Bassoon Concerto in F major, Op. 44
- Ludwig Milde: Concerto in A minor
- Gioachino Rossini: Bassoon Concerto (attributed to Rossini, authenticity questionable)
- Giuseppe Venturini, Concerto in D minor (ca. 1898)
- Carl Maria von Weber: Bassoon Concerto in F major, Op. 75 (1811)
- Ermanno Wolf-Ferrari: Suite-concertino in F major, Op. 16 (1932)

== 20th century ==
- Dieter Acker: Concerto (1979, rev. 1980)
- Murray Adaskin: Concerto (1960)
- Andreas Aigmüller, Concerto, Op. 69 (1995)
- Raffaele d'Alessandro, Concerto, Op. 75 (1956)
- David Amram: Concerto (1970)
- Jurriaan Andriessen: Concertino for Bassoon and Double Woodwind Quintet (1962)
- Tony Aubin: Concerto della Brughiera (1965)
- Conrad Baden: Concerto, Op. 126 (1980)
- Henk Badings: Concerto for Bassoon, Contrabassoon and Wind Orchestra (1964)
- Andrei Balanchivadze: Concertino (1954)
- Richard Rodney Bennett: Concerto (1994)
- Alain Bernaud: Concertino da Camera (1962; completed 2012)
- Bernard van Beurden, Concerto for Bassoon and Wind Ensemble
- Judith Bingham: Concerto (1998)
- Marcel Bitsch: Concertino for Bassoon and Orchestra (1948)
- Daniel Börtz: Concerto for Bassoon and Band (1978–79)
- Eugène Bozza: Concertino for Bassoon and Chamber Orchestra, Op. 49 (1946)
- Colin Brumby: Concerto
- Victor Bruns: Four Bassoon Concerti, Op. 5 (1933), Op. 15 (1946), Op. 41 (1966) and Op. 83 (1986), and Contrabassoon Concerto, Op. 98 (1992)
- Glenn Buhr: Concerto (1996)
- Frits Celis, Concertino, Op. 38 for bassoon, violin, viola and cello (1992)
- André Chini, Goëlette de jade Concerto for Bassoon and Strings (1999-2000)
- Dinos Constantinides: Concerto, LRC 154a
- Walter Gaze Cooper: Concerto (1977)
- Andrzej Dobrowolski: Concerto (1953)
- Franco Donatoni: Concerto (1952)
- Pierre Max Dubois: Concerto Ironico (1968)
- Sophie Carmen Eckhardt-Gramatté: Triple-Concerto for Trumpet, Clarinet, Bassoon, Strings and Timpani, E. 123 (1949); Concerto for Bassoon and Orchestra, E. 124/125 (1950)
- Helmut Eder: Concerto, Op. 49
- Anders Eliasson: Concerto (1982)
- Jindřich Feld: Concerto (1953)
- John Fernström: Concerto, Op. 80 (1945)
- Eric Fogg: Concerto (1931)
- Bjørn Fongaard: Concerto for Bassoon and Orchestra, Op. 120, No. 12; Concerto for Bassoon and Tape, Op. 131, No. 10
- Jean Françaix: Concerto for Bassoon and 11 String Instruments (1979)
- Anis Fuleihan: Concertino (1965)
- Merab Gagnidze, Concerto No. 1 (1979), Concerto No. 2 (1997)
- René Gerber: Concerto (1935–39)
- Nodar Gigauri, Concerto (1979)
- Suzanne Giraud: Concerto Crier vers l'horizon (1991)
- Benjaminas Gorbulskis, Concerto (1952); Concertino (1959)
- Launy Grøndahl: Concerto (1942)
- Sofia Gubaidulina: Concerto for Bassoon and Low Strings (1975)
- Bernhard Heiden: Concerto (1990)
- Kurt Hessenberg: Concertino, Op. 106 (1979)
- Jacques Hétu: Concerto (1979)
- Frigyes Hidas: Concerto for Bassoon and Wind Ensemble (1999)
- Paul Hindemith: Concerto for Bassoon and Trumpet (1949)
- Peter Hope: Concertino
- Bertold Hummel: Concerto, Op. 27b (1964/92)
- Gordon Jacob: Concerto (1947)
- André Jolivet: Concerto for Bassoon, String Orchestra, Harp and Piano (1951)
- John Joubert: Concerto, Op. 77 (1973)
- Raimo Kangro: Concerto, op. 27 (1981)
- Yuri Kasparov: Concerto (1996)
- Manfred Kelkel: Concerto, Op. 13 (1965)
- Lev Knipper: Double Concerto for Trumpet and Bassoon (1968), Concerto for Bassoon and Strings (1970)
- Rudolf Komorous: Chamber Concerto (1995)
- Nikolai Korndorf: Concerto Pastorale (1971)
- Uroš Krek: Concerto
- Shin'ichirō Ikebe: Concerto "The License of Blaze" (1999 / rev. 2004)
- Jiří Laburda, Concerto (1997)
- Ezra Laderman: Concerto (1954)
- Marcel Landowski: Concerto for Bassoon and Strings (1957)
- Lars-Erik Larsson: Concertino, Op. 45, No. 4 (1955)
- Ernst Mahle: Concertino (1980)
- Peter Maxwell Davies: Strathclyde Concerto No. 8 (1993)
- Chiel Meijering: "Neo-Geo" Concerto
- Francisco Mignone: Concertino (1957)
- Omar Mindorashvili, Concerto (1981)
- Vytautas Montvila: Concerto (1963)
- Oskar Morawetz: Concerto (1994)
- Saburō Moroi: Concerto, Op. 14 (1937) - lost
- Ray Næssén, Concerto for Bassoon and Wind Band
- Akira Nishimura: Concerto for Bassoon, String and Percussion "Tapas" (1990)
- Carmelo Pace: Concertino (1987)
- Andrzej Panufnik: Concerto (1985) (in memory of Jerzy Popiełuszko)
- Boris Papandopulo: Concerto
- Jiří Pauer: Concerto (1949)
- Johnterryl Plumeri: Concerto
- Amando Blanquer Ponsoda, Concerto (1977)
- Stanojlo Rajičić: Concerto (1969)
- Primož Ramovš: Concerto piccolo
- Alan Ridout: Concertino
- Jean Rivier: Concerto (1964)
- Nino Rota: Concerto (1974–77)
- Marcel Rubin: Concerto (1978)
- Harald Sæverud: Concerto, Op. 44 (1964)
- Stellan Sagvik, Svensk (ångermanländsk) Concertino, Op. 114e (1982)
- Friedrich Schenker: Concerto (1970)
- Gunther Schuller: Concerto "Eine Kleine Fagottmusik" (1985)
- Antonio Scontrino: Concerto (1920)
- Lucijan Marija Škerjanc: Concerto (1952)
- Thomas Sleeper: Concerto (1993)
- Michał Spisak, Concerto (1944)
- Egīls Straume, Concerto (1985)
- Stjepan Šulek: Concerto (1958)
- Henri Tomasi: Concerto (1961)
- Yuzo Toyama: Concerto for Bassoon, Strings and Percussion (1982)
- Marc Vaubourgoin: Concerto (1968)
- Enn Vetemaa: Concertino (1993)
- Arthur Weisberg: Concerto (1998)
- Alec Wilder: Air for Bassoon and Strings (1945)
- John Williams: The Five Sacred Trees (1995)
- Guy Woolfenden: Concerto (1999)
- Takashi Yoshimatsu: Concerto "Unicorn Circuit" (1988)
- León Zuckert: Concerto (1976)
- Ellen Taaffe Zwilich: Concerto (1992)

== 21st century ==
- Kalevi Aho: Concerto (2004)
- Mark Alburger: Concerto, Op. 120 (2004); Triple Concerto, Op. 201 (bn, cbn, hp, 2012)
- Tzvi Avni: Concerto (2002)
- Ioseb Bardanashvili: Artiton (2010)
- Judith Bingham: Concerto Leonardo for Bassoon and Thirteen Strings (2012)
- Howard Blake: Concerto, op. 607 (2009)
- Howard J. Buss: Concerto for Bassoon and Orchestra (2022)
- David Chesky: Concerto (2006)
- Jack Curtis Dubowsky: Concerto (2005)
- Eric Ewazen: Concerto for Bassoon and Wind Ensemble (2002)
- Viktor Fortin, Concertino for Bassoon and Wind Ensemble (2002)
- Sean Friar: Concerto for Bassoon and Wind Ensemble (2023)
- Dai Fujikura: Concerto (2012)
- Michael Gandolfi: Concerto (2009)
- Gregor Huebner: African Visions, Op. 23 for Bassoon and String Orchestra (2004)
- Jouni Kaipainen: Concerto, Op. 74 (2005)
- Tõnu Kõrvits: Teispool Päikesevälju (Beyond the Solar Fields) (2004); Concerto Vihma laulud vikerkaarele (Rain's Songs to the Rainbow) (2016)
- Ülo Krigul: Concerto Goin' (2014)
- Marjan Mozetich: Concerto for Bassoon and Strings with Marimba (2003)
- Nico Muhly: Reliable Sources, Concerto for Bassoon and Wind Ensemble / Orchestral Winds (2018)
- Marc Neikrug: Concerto (2013)
- Jean-Louis Petit: Les Paradis Se Rencontrent, Ils Ne Se Fabriquent Pas Concertino for Bassoon and Mandolin Orchestra with Contrabass (2002), Concertino for Bassoon and Orchestra
- Gene Pritsker: Concerto No. 1 Essentially Tragic for Amplified Bassoon and Chamber Orchestra (2001), Concerto No. 2 Breath of Rhetoric (2013)
- Wolfgang Rihm: Psalmus for bassoon and orchestra (2007)
- Christopher Rouse: Concerto (2018)
- Robin Stevens: Concerto (2014-16)
- Eino Tamberg: Concerto, Op. 108 (2000)
- Jerod Impichchaachaaha' Tate: Ghost of the White Deer: Concerto for Bassoon and Orchestra (2020)
- Christopher Theofanidis: Concerto (1997-2002)
- Augusta Read Thomas: Concertino (2013)
- Joan Tower: Red Maple for Bassoon and Strings (2013)
- Erkki-Sven Tüür: Concerto (2003)
- Gwyneth Walker: Concerto (2000)

Other notable pieces for bassoon and orchestra include Berwald's Konzertstück, Elgar's Romance, Villa-Lobos's Ciranda Das Sete Notas, and Weber's Andante e Rondo Ongarese.

== See also ==
- Bassoon
- Bassoon sonata
- Bass oboe concerto
- Clarinet concerto
- English horn concerto
- Oboe concerto
- List of concert works for saxophone
