= Bassoon Concerto =

Bassoon Concerto may refer to:

- Bassoon concerto, a concerto for bassoon accompanied by a musical ensemble
- Bassoon Concerto (Jolivet)
- Bassoon Concerto (Mozart)
- Bassoon Concerto (Neikrug)
- Bassoon Concerto (Panufnik)
- Bassoon Concerto (Rouse)
- Bassoon Concerto (Weber)
- Bassoon Concerto (Zwilich)
