= Association for Contemporary Music =

Alternative organization of Russian composers interested in avant-garde music

Association for Contemporary Music (ACM) (Russian: ACM - Ассоциация Современной Музыки, ASM - Assotsiatsiya Sovremennoy Muzyki) was an alternative organization of Russian composers interested in avant-garde music. It was founded by Nikolai Roslavets in 1923. ACM ran concert series and published magazines promoting the modernist music of Mahler, Schoenberg, Berg, Webern, Krenek, and Hindemith, as well as the work of its members. Its leading members were Dmitri Shostakovich, Nikolai Myaskovsky, Vissarion Shebalin, Alexander Mosolov, Gavriil Popov, and Vladimir Shcherbachev. The organization's enthusiasm for avant-garde Western music and for experimentation met with opposition from the Russian Association of Proletarian Musicians (RAPM), which by the late 1920s had eclipsed the ACM in terms of cultural influence. ACM was formally disbanded in 1931, whereas RAPM existed until 23 April 1932, when it was abolished by the Decree on the Reformation of Literary and Artistic Organizations.

Russia's New ACM (or ACM-2), the revival of the previous organization, was established in Moscow in 1990. Its chairman was composer Edison Denisov. The co-founders of the new ACM were Elena Firsova, Dmitri Smirnov, and Nikolai Korndorf. Its members included Leonid Hrabovsky, Alexander Knaifel, Sergei Pavlenko, Alexander Voustin, Vladislav Shoot, Viktor Yekimovsky, Faraj Karayev, Vyacheslav Artyomov, Vladimir Tarnopolsky, Alexander Raskatov, Ivan Sokolov, and Yuri Kasparov. Eminent composers like Sofia Gubaidulina, Alfred Schnittke, Valentin Silvestrov, and Tigran Mansuryan were invited to join the ACM. ACM became affiliated with the International Society for Contemporary Music (ISCM).

After the collapse of the Soviet Union in 1991, many members of the ACM emigrated to the West, and Denisov died in 1996. The ACM was split into two parts. One, based in the Union of Composers and led by Victor Yekimovsky, adopted the title "Russian National Section, the International Society for Contemporary Music" (RNS-ISCM); it supported the "Moscow Contemporary Music Ensemble". The other, based in the Moscow Conservatory and led by Vladimir Tarnopolsky, took the name "Centre for Contemporary Music, Moscow" (CCMM). CCMM was the ISCM Associate Member, and supported the "Studio of New Music".
