= Yuri Kholopov =

Russian musicologist (1932–2003)

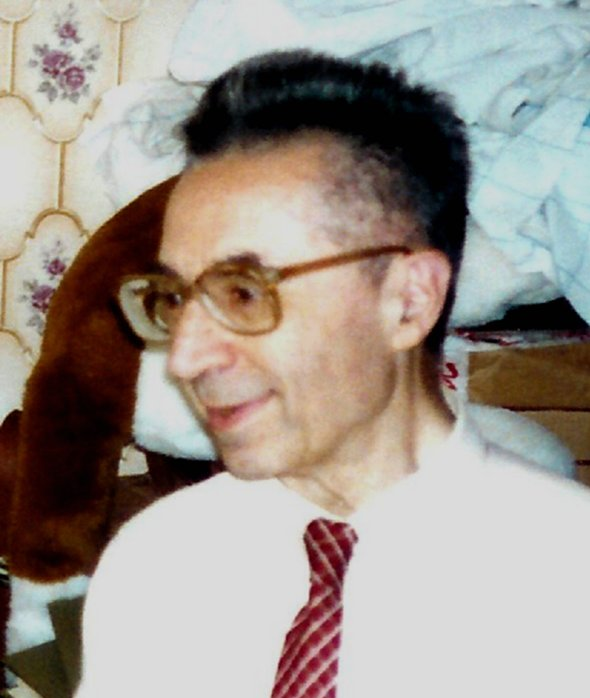
Yuri Kholopov in 2001, Moscow

Yuri Nikolaevich Kholopov (Russian: Ю́рий Никола́евич Холóпов, Yury Holopov; 14 August 1932, Ryazan – 24 April 2003, Moscow) was a Russian musicologist and educator.

== Biography ==
After graduating from Ryazan Music Regional College he studied at the Moscow Conservatoire from 1949 to 1954 with Igor Sposobin and then with Semyon Bogatyrev, completing his master's degree in 1960.

In 1963 he became a member of the Composers' Union of the USSR.

He presented his PhD thesis in 1975 with a monograph Contemporary Aspects of Harmony in Music of Prokofiev printed earlier in 1967, and the Doctorate Degree thesis in 1977, with a monograph Essays in Contemporary Harmony printed in 1974. His important research of life and music of Anton von Webern was printed in two volumes in 1973 and 1975 (in collaboration with his sister, Valentina Kholopova).

He taught at the Tchaikovsky Conservatory Moscow since 1960, where he became a professor in 1983. His teaching was highly influential for several generations of musicians. He has written more than 1000 works (800 of which have been published), practically on all aspects of music theory. Especially important were his textbooks of harmony (both theoretical and practical studies) which have been now commonly recognized in Russia as a standard of advanced music education.

Kholopov's political views and his ethical and aesthetic principles are formulated in a programmatic article about Edison Denisov:

"Denisov also became a witness of a really terrible epoch – the crash of Russia in 90es. Being far from a policy, he could not see, of course, everything that really occurred in his fatherland [...]. Nevertheless, it is quite sure, he would keep his ideological and artistic position and would resist to "democratic" tendencies of disintegration, amoralism, unscrupulousness and a profit cult. It is possible to draw an analogy between Denisov' position and that of Olivier Messiaen, when the last was imprisoned into a concentration camp. [...] Ethical and aesthetic principles of Denisov's personality concorded very well with his life, strong physical and mental health of that Siberian, with his kind smile, steady affability and correct manner, with normal human cheerfulness. Just imagine it: a man of 65, the world famous composer in his Moscow apartment with a young wife and two funny little girls, his daughters: that is a psychological paradigm of Denisov's music which was vitally normal, sincerely healthy, beautiful, refined, bright, inner steady" (Ju. N. Kholopov. Edison Denisov i muzika kontsa veka [Edison Denisov and music of the end of the century]. In: Svet. Dobro. Vechnost'. Pamyati Edisona Denisova. Stat’i. Vospominaniya. Dokumenti [Light. Kindness. Eternity. Edison Denisov in memoriam. Articles. Recollections. Materials], ed. by V.Tsenova. Moscow, 1999, pp. 6–7).

== Selected books ==
Comment. All Kholopov's books are originally written in Russian

- Modern Features of Prokofiev's Harmony. Moscow: Muzyka, 1967. Orig. title: Современные черты гармонии Прокофьева
- Essays on Contemporary Harmony. Moscow: Muzyka, 1974. Orig. title: Очерки современной гармонии
- (with Valentina Kholopova) Anton Webern. Life and Work. Moscow: Sovetskij Kompozitor, 1984; Berlin, 1989 (In German); Milano, 1990 (In Italian). Orig. title: Антон Веберн. Жизнь и творчество
- Harmony. Theoretical Course. Moscow: Muzyka, 1988; 2nd ed. revised, Saint Petersburg: Lan', 2003. Orig. title: Гармония. Теоретический курс
- (with Valeria Tsenova) Edison Denisov. Moscow: Kompozitor, 1993; Amsterdam: Harwood Academic Publishers, 1995 (In English). Orig. title: Эдисон Денисов
- (with Valentina Kholopova) Music of Webern. Moscow: Kompozitor, 1999. Orig. title: Музыка Веберна
- (with Valeria Tsenova) Edison Denisov — the Russian Voice in European New Music. Berlin: Verlag Ernst Kuhn, 2002. In English
- Harmony. Practical Course. 2 vls. Moscow: Kompozitor, 2003; 2nd ed. Moscow, 2005. Orig. title: Гармония. Практический курс
- Music Theory of Heinrich Schenker. Moscow: Kompozitor, 2006. Orig. title: Музыкально-теоретическая система Хайнриха Шенкера
- Introduction to Musical Form / Ed. by T. Kyuregyan and V. Tsenova. Moscow: Moscow Conservatory, 2006. Orig. title: Введение в музыкальную форму
- Harmonic analysis. 3 vls. Moscow: Muzyka, 1996, 2001, 2009. Orig. title: Гармонический анализ.

== Selected articles ==
- Philip Gershkovich's search for the lost essence of music; also: List of Philip Gershkovich's musicological research studies; List of Philip Gershkovich's musical compositions; Some of Philip Gershkovich’s aphorisms. In: «Ex oriente...III» Eight Composers from the former USSR Philip Gershkovich, Boris Tishchenko, Leonid Grabovsky, Alexander Knaifel, Vladislav Shoot, Alexander Vustin, Alexander Raskatov, Sergei Pavlenko. Edited by Valeria Tsenova. English edition only. (studia slavica musicologica, Bd. 31) Verlag Ernst Kuhn – Berlin ISBN 3-928864-92-0
- Russians in England: Dmitri Smirnov, Elena Firsova. Article, in: Music From the Former USSR. Issue 2. Moscow: Composer, 1996, pp. 255–303 (in Russian); also in «Ex oriente...I» Ten Composers from the former USSR. Viktor Suslin, Dmitri Smirnov, Arvo Pärt, Yury Kasparov, Galina Ustvolskaya, Nikolai Sidelnikov, Elena Firsova Vladimir Martynov, Andrei Eshpai, Boris Chaikovsky. Edited by Valeria Tsenova (studia slavica musicologica, Bd. 25), Verlag Ernst Kuhn – Berlin. ISBN 3-928864-84-X pp. 207–266 (in English)

== Criticism ==
An attempt by Kholopov to upbuild a doctrine of the musical-historic process turned out unsuccessful. It has been claimed that it is tautological, fantastic and even chimeric. An attempt to mitigate these rigid assessments of the concept was ended in recognition as a mythical this brave and unsuccessful storming the problem by Yuri Nikolayevich.

In propensity of Kholopov to the myth-making can make sure everyone, who read the fantastic chimera «rainbow spectrum of intervals» in Kholopov's definition of the natural harmonic series.
