= Claude Rostand =

French musicologist, musicographer and music critic

- Born: 3 December 1912; Paris
- Died: 9 October 1970 (aged 57); Villejuif
- Occupation(s): Musicologist; Musicographer; Music critic

Claude Rostand (3 December 1912 – 9 October 1970) was a French musicologist, musicographer and music critic.

== Biography ==
While studying literature and law at the Sorbonne, Rostand studied piano, harmony, counterpoint and musical composition in private at the Conservatoire de Paris with Jacques Février, Norbert Dufourcq, Édouard Mignan and Marc Vaubourgoin.

A humanist, known for his great erudition, he entered as a music critic for the newspaper Le Monde, the Figaro littéraire and the magazine Carrefour. He was also a French correspondent for the magazines Melos and Musical America as well as The New York Times. A lecturer by the Jeunesses musicales de France, he participated in numerous programs at the ORTF and worked for various German radio stations. He gave a series of radio lectures under the title "Éphémérides de la musique contemporaine".

In 1958, he organized concerts of contemporary music at the Théâtre national populaire under the name "Musique d’aujourd’hui". In 1961 he became vice-president of the ISCM (International Society for Contemporary Music). In 1966, he directed a film on Erik Satie for Baden-Baden television.

Open to all kinds of music, Claude Rostand was particularly interested in the study of the 1800s and the avant-garde music of the 1900s.

== Writings ==
- 1945: L’œuvre de Gabriel Fauré
- 1945: Petit guide de l’auditeur de musique: les chefs-d’œuvre du piano
- 1952: Petit guide de l’auditeur de musique: les chefs-d’œuvre de la musique de chambre
- 1952: La Musique française contemporaine
- 1952: Avec Darius Milhaud: Entretiens avec Claude Rostand
- 1954: Avec Francis Poulenc: Entretiens avec Claude Rostand
- 1954–5: Brahms
- 1957: L'oeuvre de Pierre-Octave Ferroud : catalogue
- 1957: Olivier Messiaen
- 1959: Avec Igor Markevitch: Entretiens avec Claude Rostand
- 1960: Liszt, Éditions du Seuil, series Solfèges, #15
- 1960: La musique allemande
- 1964: Richard Strauss: l’homme et son œuvre
- 1967: Hugo Wolf
- 1969: Anton Webern
- 1970: Dictionnaire de la musique contemporaine

In addition, Claude Rostand participated in several collective publications:

- 1960–1963: Histoire de la musique dein the Bibliothèque de la Pléiade
- 1963: Stravinski, collective work
- 1965–66: La musique sérielle d'aujourd'hui, in an investigation led by André Boucourechliev
- 1970: Schumann, collective work.

== Prix Claude Rostand ==
Every year, the professional syndicate of theater, music and dance critics presents its Grands Prix, which distinguishes the shows and artistic personalities that marked the season. The "Prix Claude-Rostand" rewards a lyrical production.

== Bibliography ==
- Yvonne Tiénot. "Rostand, Claude." Grove Music Online. Oxford Music Online. 29 Jun. 2011
- ISCM site de l’International Society for Contemporary Music.
