= Bassoon Concerto (Zwilich) =

The Concerto for Bassoon and Orchestra is a bassoon concerto written by the American composer Ellen Taaffe Zwilich. The work was commissioned by the Pittsburgh Symphony Orchestra for their principal bassoonist Nancy Goeres. It was given its world premiere by Goeres and the Pittsburgh Symphony Orchestra under the direction of Lorin Maazel in Heinz Hall for the Performing Arts, Pittsburgh, on May 13, 1993. The piece is dedicated to Maazel, Goeres, and the Pittsburgh Symphony Orchestra.

== Composition ==
The Bassoon Concerto has a duration of approximately 17 minutes in performance and is cast in two movements:

1. Maestoso
2. Allegro molto

=== Instrumentation ===
The work is scored for a solo bassoon and an orchestra consisting of piccolo, flute, oboe, cor anglais, clarinet, bass clarinet, two horns in F, trumpet, trombone, one percussionist, and strings.

== Reception ==
Reviewing the world premiere, Robert Croan of the Pittsburgh Post-Gazette wrote, "The new 17-minute concerto has an opening movement that might be called Brahmsian in its majesty and emphasis on the low, dark sonorities. Once the solo instrument enters, Zwilich exploits the broadness of its range and lyrical potential. Echoes of Shostakovich come to mind, but the musical personality that emerges is very much Zwilich's own. It is in its livelier second movement that this concerto really comes to life, with a marvelous cadenza that shows just about every aspect of the instrument."
