= Valery Popov (musician) =

Russian bassoonist (born 1937)

Valery Popov (born 9 September 1937) is a Russian bassoonist, described as the foremost of his era in Russia in his Grove Music Online entry.

== Biography ==
Popov was born on 9 September 1937 in Moscow. His father, Sergei Petrovich Popov (1914–2012), was a trumpeter who was a soloist with the USSR State Radio Symphony Orchestra and the USSR State Symphony Orchestra. Valery Popov at first studied the trumpet, switching to the bassoon in 1957.

In 1959, he joined the Opera-Symphony State Radio and Television orchestra. In 1960 he graduated from the Musical College (in the class of V. Gorbachov) and attended the Moscow Conservatory where he studied with R. Terekhin.

Popov won first prize in the national competition in Leningrad in 1963 as well as in the competition in Budapest in 1965.

In 1962 Popov joined the USSR State Symphony Orchestra as principal bassoonist. Shortly thereafter he played the solo part in Igor Stravinsky's The Rite of Spring under conductor Robert Craft in the presence of the composer. He played with the orchestra for 26 years, under many notable conductors including Evgeny Svetlanov, Natan Rakhlin, Aleksandr Gauk, Kiril Kondrashin, Valery Gergiev and Gennady Rozhdestvensky. From 1988 Popov has played with the State Symphony Capella under conductor Valery Polyansky and in Yuri Kasparov's Moscow Contemporary Music Ensemble.

His repertoire includes concertos by Vivaldi, Mozart, Boismortier, Dutilleux, Kozeluh, Zelenka, Weber, J. C. Bach, K. Stamitz, J. Hummel, André Jolivet, Wolf-Ferrari, Villa-Lobos and Tomazi. He was a friend of the composer Vladislav Shoot, and Shoot as well as the composers Yuri Levitin, Sofia Gubaidulina, Mikhail Alekseyev, Lev Knipper, Edison Denisov and Alfred Schnittke have all written works for the bassoon dedicated to him. He played works by Gubaidulina at the Centre Acanthes summer school in Villeneuve-lès-Avignon in 1998.

Popov has taught at the Moscow Conservatory since 1971, and has been the chair of its woodwind and percussion departments since 1992.

Popov is known nationally and internationally for his many recordings; he has released nearly a hundred under the Melodia, JVC, Chandos, Olympia and Vista Vera labels. These include the major bassoon concertos and solo works, performed with the pianist Alexander Bakhchiev. He plays an instrument made by J. Püchner. He has published several collections of studies and orchestral solos for the bassoon.

He was honoured with the title of People's Artist of the Russian Federation in 1986.

== Reception ==
The British bassoonist William Waterhouse describes Popov in his Grove Music Online entry as the foremost bassoonist of his era in Russia; he characterises Popov's playing as "warm and virile". The critic David Schwartz calls Popov "a very influential force in the bassoon world" and describes his pioneering 1989 recording of five Vivaldi concertos as having stimulated interest in recording the concertos. He comments on Popov's "thick, soupy, and robust vibratoladen tone" which pre-dates recent ideas about Baroque performance. A review of concertos by Danzi, Vivaldi and Hummel for American Record Guide describes Popov's playing as "fluid and fluent", with "warm and resonant" tone and "superb" technique. The music critic Donald Vroon in an American Record Guide comparison of recordings of Mozart's bassoon concerto describes his playing as being rather romantic, with "a round, fat tone".

A review in Fanfare praises Popov's 1976 recording of Jolivet's bassoon concerto, and states that he "deftly skates the thin ice between comic and soulful". Another review of the same recording in American Record Guide describes his breath control in the high register as "impressive". Comparing recordings of Denisov's Sonata for Solo Bassoon, Ronald E. Grames prefers Katarzyna Zdybel's performance, considering that Popov is "hard pressed at times to make it sound like more than exercises".
