= Canta-Concerto =

The Canta-Concerto is a concerto for mezzo-soprano and orchestra by the American composer Marc Neikrug. The work was commissioned by the New York Philharmonic and was completed in May 2014. It was first performed by the mezzo-soprano Sasha Cooke and the New York Philharmonic under the direction of Alan Gilbert at David Geffen Hall on October 1, 2015. The piece is dedicated to Alan Gilbert.

== Composition ==
=== Background ===
Neikrug conceived the Canta-Concerto as concerto for voice—a genre with few examples in the classical repertoire. In the score program notes, the composer wrote, "Instrumental students are always told by their teachers that the voice is the most natural and beautiful instrument and should be imitated. But it struck me that with the exception of a concerto by Glière, there are no concertos for voice." He continued, "Since vocalists are very tied to 'the word,' they are always choosing a middle ground between diction and pure sound production. I wanted to write a piece where the sound production dominates and the range of emotional context was that of a concerto for an instrument." The composition has a duration of approximately 25 minutes and is cast in four numbered movements, which Neikrug described as "a dramatic first movement, a scherzo-like interlude, a slow movement, and a finale that owes more than a bit to jazz."

=== Instrumentation ===
The work is scored for a solo mezzo-soprano and an orchestra comprising three flutes (one doubling alto flute), three oboes (one doubling cor anglais, three clarinets (one doubling bass clarinet), two bassoons, four horns, two trumpets, two trombones, tuba, timpani, three percussionists, harp, celesta, and strings.

== Reception ==
Reviewing the world premiere, Anthony Tommasini of The New York Times called the Canta-Concerto a "skillfully written piece" and wrote, " He continued:

Mr. Neikrug's compositional language for Canta-Concerto, established in the first orchestral stirrings of the fitful opening movement, seems inspired by the Expressionist style of Berg. The music begins with a pungent, sustained sonority, a quivering mass of sounds, within which fragments dart about. The soloist enters, singing an unfolding line that has melodic shape, yet keeps breaking into sputtering bursts. For all the variety of the vocal part, which evokes instrumental writing in its virtuosity, it was hard to avoid trying to find some meaning in what Ms. Cooke was singing. Was this some strange language? Surely Mr. Neikrug intended us to have this mixed reaction, both fascinated and frustrated. The second movement, alive with percussion instruments, is short, percolating and angry. The dark, heavy, slow third movement, thick with atonal angst in the orchestra, finally gives the soloist long, searching melodic lines, which Ms. Cooke, singing with warmth and poignancy, made the most of. The jazzy finale has playful stretches, almost like scatting, as the soloist seems to take defiant command of the proceedings.

Tommasini nevertheless added, "Canta-Concerto inventively rattles your expectations of what a work for voice and orchestra can be. The music itself, however, on first hearing, lacked a final measure of inspiration and originality; it was a little dourly Bergian."

Arlo McKinnon of Opera News was more critical of the work, however, observing:

Neikrug seemed to employ the orchestra primarily as a background texture to the singer, not as a partner in dialogue. At varying tempos, the music remained highly static. The overall effect was like that of looking at a revolving prism: one observed many beautiful colors, but soon got the idea and is ready to move on to something else. Essentially, in Canta-Concerto Neikrug gave us twenty-five minutes of this effect, which was about twenty minutes more of it than the most listeners needed. Only in the final minutes of the fourth movement did there seem to be a new direction developing, but this impulse arrived too late and delivered too little.
