= Concerto for Orchestra (Neikrug) =

2011 composition by Marc Neikrug

The Concerto for Orchestra is an orchestral composition by the American composer Marc Neikrug. The work was commissioned by the New York Philharmonic and was completed in May 2011. It was given its world premiere by the New York Philharmonic under the conductor Alan Gilbert at Avery Fisher Hall on April 26, 2012. The concerto is dedicated to Alan Gilbert.

== Composition ==
The Concerto for Orchestra has a duration of roughly 30 minutes and is composed in three movements:

1. First movement
2. Scherzo
3. Adagio

Neikrug described the piece in the score program notes, writing, "It is meant to feature the great virtuoso orchestra. While the composition is rigorously structured from basic unifying elements, it is intended as a show piece. The musical core of the piece is a series of chords constructed from expanding intervals. These same expanding intervals form the basis of the melodic structure of the piece."

=== Instrumentation ===
The work is scored for an orchestra comprising three flutes (3rd doubling piccolo), three oboes (3rd doubling cor anglais), three clarinets (3rd doubling bass clarinet), three bassoons, four horns, three trumpets, two trombones, bass trombone, tuba, timpani, three percussionists, harp, celesta, and strings.

== Reception ==
Allan Kozinn of The New York Times gave the Concerto for Orchestra modest praise, writing:

Mr. Neikrug seemed intent on putting every one of the orchestra's sections and subsections in the spotlight, sometimes for brief bursts within a stream of morphing timbres, often for extended, shapely passages in a style that oscillated between neo-Romanticism and Impressionism. He seemed especially engaged by the possibilities for percussionists, and when they were not featured on their own, they were combined with woodwinds and brasses or jangled beneath suave string lines.

Kozinn nevertheless added:

But having focused so thoroughly on putting the musicians on display, Mr. Neikrug neglected the other part of a composer's job, which is to say something memorable. Often it seemed as if he were rummaging through a toy box, shaking this and striking that, then moving on blithely to the next thing. Without a strong thematic thread — think of the high-profile themes in Bartok’s Concerto for Orchestra — even virtuosity eventually pales.
