= Healing Ceremony =

Healing Ceremony is a song cycle for mezzo-soprano, baritone, and orchestra by the American composer Marc Neikrug. The work was commissioned by the University of New Mexico for the dedication of a cancer Treatment and clinical research facility. It was premiered in the UNM's Popejoy Hall on June 11, 2010, with vocalists Susan Graham and Matthew Worth performing under conductor Guillermo Figueroa and the New Mexico Symphony Orchestra. Neikrug specifically composed the piece as a therapeutic experience for listeners.

== Composition ==
Neikrug described his inspiration for Healing Ceremony, writing:

I started thinking about people who get sick — not just cancer — but anytime someone finds out from their doctor that something is really wrong with them. I thought about the power music has over people; I wanted to write something that would change how your body feels — helping you calm down, handle stress, get in touch with inner feelings and inner thoughts.

He added, "This is not a treatment, but it surely can put you in the right place."

Neikrug, a long-time resident of a Pueblo reservation in Santa Fe, New Mexico, was also influenced by Native American culture, remarking, "I've known the [Pueblo] culture for 25 years, their sense of the earth, of their place connected to the earth — this is a huge factor in their way of looking at life. It's very powerful in feeling grounded."

== Discography ==
A recording of Healing Ceremony was released April 23, 2013 through Entertainment One.
