= Vladimir Tarnopolsky =

Russian composer (born 1955)

Vladimir Tarnopolsky Владимир Григорьевич Тарнопольский
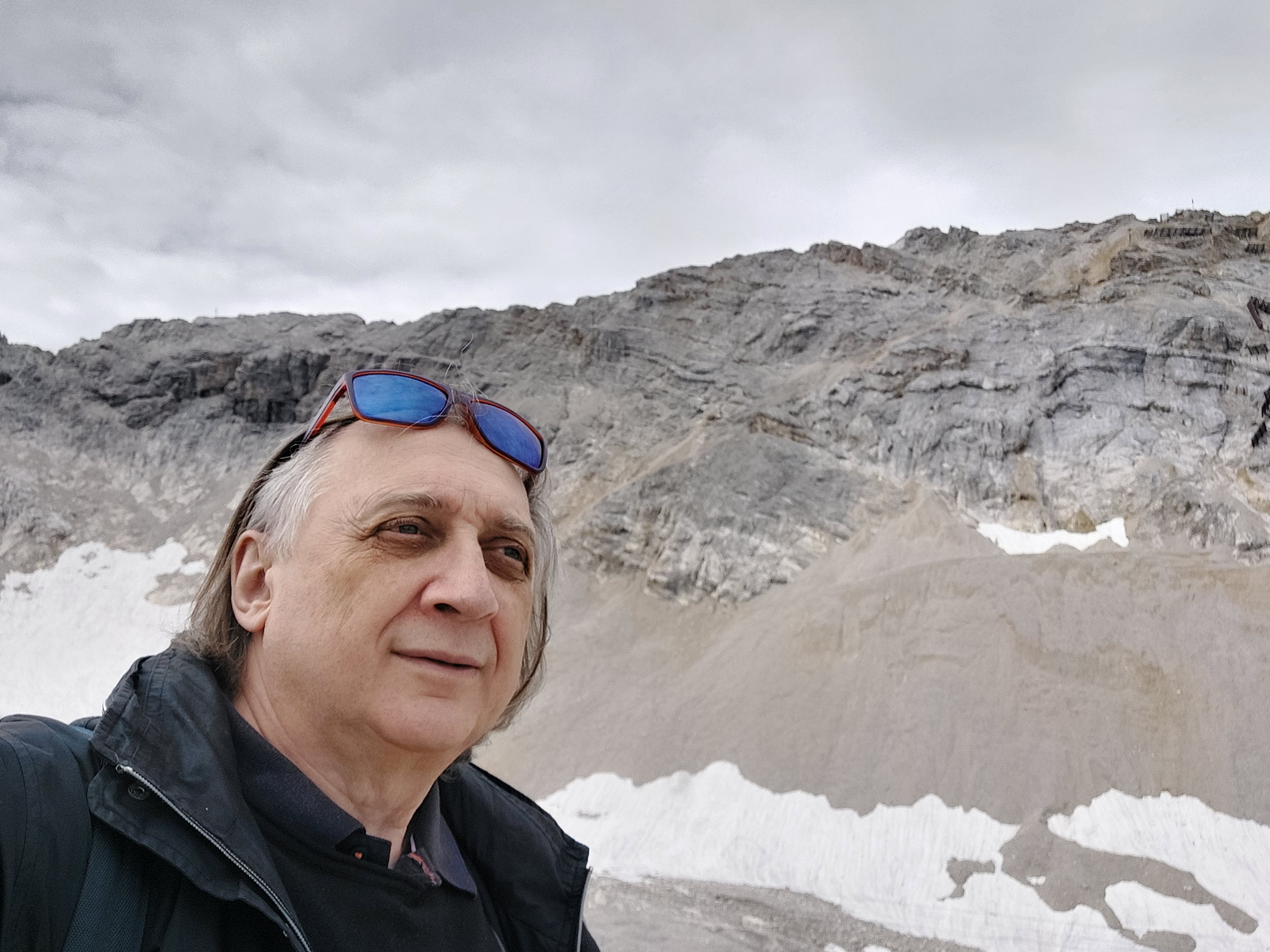

Background information
- Born: Dnepropetrovsk, Ukrainian SSR, USSR
- Origin: Ukraine
- Occupation: Composer

Vladimir Grigoryevich Tarnopolsky (Russian: Влади́мир Григо́рьевич Тарнопо́льский, born April 30, 1955, in Dnipro, Ukrainian SSR) is a Russian-Ukrainian composer.

== Biography ==
The composer has written music since childhood, having mastered the bases of composition independently. After his studies at the Dnepropetrovsk Glinka Music College (1970–1973) majoring in piano (studying with Mikaela Alexandrova) and music theory, he studied composition at the Moscow State Conservatory with Nikolai Sidelnikov and the theoretical disciplines of harmony, form and counterpoint with Yuri Kholopov (1973–1980).

A special role in Tarnopolsky's compositional development has been played by Edison Denisov, who gave him the first professional advice and recommendations, first by correspondence, and then at the Conservatory he became his teacher of orchestration, at the same time, having preserved a certain amount of influence in the sphere of musical composition, as well. During his student years, Tarnopolsky entered the so-called “Denisov circle” of composers, who assumed an alternative position in regard to the official standards of the Soviet ideology and in the late 1980s formed the active core of the artistic group of the Association of Contemporary Music No. 2. His diploma work, the Concerto for Cello and Orchestra (1980) was included by conductor Gennady Rozhdestvensky into his concert cycle “From the History of Russian Music”. In 1987 in Parczew (Poland) he participated in a master-class under the direction of Luigi Nono, from whom he received a warm valediction and a priceless present – the authorial score of his just completed composition No hay caminos, hay que caminar… Andrej Tarkowskij (There are no paths, one must go forward... to Andrei Tarkovsky, 1987).

From 1981, Tarnopolsky taught composition at the Moscow Ippolitov-Ivanov Music College. From 1992 to April 2022 he was a professor at the Composition Department of the Moscow State P.I. Tchaikovsky Conservatory. Many of his students have received renown and have become prize winners in international composers’ competitions. In 2003, upon his initiative the Contemporary Music Department was established (where he was the chairman of the department until 2017), on which tutorial courses of history of new music for musicologists, analysis of contemporary scores and the most contemporary techniques for composers and performers have been developed.

In April 2022 Tarnopolsky moved to Germany; presently he is a visiting professor at the Hochschule fȕr Musik und Theater in Munich. He also carries out projects in other universities.

== Festivals and competitions ==
Tarnopolsky has participated in numerous international contemporary music festivals, including the festival Acht Brücken Köln, the “Almeida” festival in London, the Beethovenfest in Bonn, the Munich Opera Biennale, the Berliner Festwochen, the Dresdner Tage fȕr Neue Musik, the Frankfurter Musikfest der Alten Oper, the Ilhom-Festival in Tashkent, the Holland Festival, the Hommage aux Russes in Paris, the Huddersfield festival, the Kara Karayev Festival in Baku, the Klangspuren (Austria), La Biennale di Venezia, Make Music Together in Boston, the Manca Festival (France/Monaco), the Mannes Festival in New York, the Schleswig-Holstein Musikfest (Germany), Tage fȕr Neue Musik Zurich, the Warsaw Autumn, Wien Modern, The World Music Days of the ISCM, the New York-based festival Sonic Boom, the Moscow Autumn festival, the Alternativa Festival in Moscow, “Zvyozdy belykh nochey” (Stars of the White Nights, St. Petersburg), “Drugoe prostranstvo” (Other Space, Moscow) and many others.

He has been invited as a jury member to many international composers’ competitions in Russia and in other countries, including the ISCM World Music Days, Gaudeamus Music Week (Amsterdam), the Witold Lutoslawski Competition (Warsaw), the Goffredo Petrassi Festival (Italy), Gesualdo Reloaded (Italy), the “Orfey” Radio Competition (Russia), The Rivers Awards International Composition Competition (Shanghai), a number of competitions in the USA and in the countries of the former USSR, etc.

== Curatorial activities ==
Vladimir Tarnopolsky was among the initiators of the Association for Contemporary Music in Moscow (АСМ–2, 1989), a group of composers who at the time of the end of the Soviet period united together against the official Soviet aesthetics and ideology.

In 1993 at the Moscow State P.I. Tchaikovsky Conservatory he founded the Center for Contemporary Music, the first of its kind in Russia, and the ensemble “Studio for New Music”, and in 1994 he initiated the “Moscow Forum” International Festival of Contemporary Music – the only festival in Russia which set as its goal not only to disclose the relevant tendencies in the development of a new aesthetics and language of the art of music, but also to interpret them in a social-political discourse. During the course of 30 years, there have been festivals organized of the contemporary music of Germany, France, Italy, Austria, the Netherlands, Poland, Switzerland, which have become important events in the musical life of Russia. In these projects over 1500 Russian and world premieres of works by composers from Russia and other countries took place.

Such projects as “The Red Wheel,” “The Unknown 20th Century Russian Music,” “Russia-Germany. Chapters of the History of 20th Century Music,” “An Anthology of the Avant-garde,” “Specters of Time” (contemporary French music), “Sound Liberation!”, “Europe through the Eyes of Russians, Russia through the Eyes of Europeans,” “Specter of the Future” and others received resonance in Russia and internationally.

One of the chief directions of Tarnopolsky'ss curatorial work has been the revival back into the concert repertoire of the undeservedly forgotten music of the early Russian avant-garde period. A number of his concerts and festivals featured sensational discoveries – premieres of compositions pertaining to the time period from the 1910s to the early 1930s, including the first Russian Chamber Symphony composed by Nikolai Roslavets (1933), previously unperformed fragments of Dmitri Shostakovich’s opera The Nose (1928), works by Nikolai Obukhov, Yefim Golyscheff, Ivan Wyschnegradsky, Arthur Lourié, Evgeny O. Gunst, Wladimir Vogel, etc. Tarnopolsky is the initiator of the Piotr Jurgenson International Competition for Young Composers in Moscow (from 2001), as well as the International Competition of the Moscow Conservatory (from 2018).

== Recognition ==
Vladimir Tarnopolsky's musical compositions are frequently performed in Moscow and abroad. He has been commissioned to write compositions by the leading musical ensembles, orchestras and theaters of the world, including: the Ensemble of Soloists of the Bolshoi Theatre, the Bavarian Radio Symphony Orchestra, the Munich Philharmonic Orchestra, the Symphony Orchestra of the Mariinsky Theater, the Rotterdam Philharmonic Orchestra, the Ensemble Modern and Ensemble Musikfabrik in Germany, the Ensemble Intercontemporain in Paris, the Schönberg Ensemble in the Netherlands, Klangforum Wien in Austria and many others.

Premieres of his operas and works for the stage have taken place within the operatic Munich biennale, in Barbican Hall in London, at the Beethovenfest in Bonn, at the Rencontres Musicales d’Evian (France), at the Festival of Contemporary Dance in Amsterdam (the Netherlands), at the Music Festival in Bergen (Norway), at the Kara Karayev Festival in Baku, at the Mariinsky Theater in St. Petersburg, at the Konstantin Stanislavsky and Vladimir Nemirovich-Danchenko Opera Theater in Moscow, at the Chamber Music Theatre under the direction of Boris Pokrovsky, etc.

Vladimir Tarnopolski was the first Russian composer invited as a professor at the Internationale Ferienkurse fȕr Neue Musik in Darmstadt (2010). He regularly reads lectures and conducts master classes in Russia, Austria, China, Germany, the United Kingdom, the Netherlands, Poland, France, Sweden, Switzerland, Ukraine, USA and other countries, including such universities as Harvard, Oxford, Cambridge and others.

Tarnopolski's musical compositions have been awarded a number of prizes, including the Dmitri Shostakovich Prize (Russia, 1991) and the Paul Hindemith Prize (Germany, 1991), International Rostrum of Composers award (2001). He has been invited as a composer-in-residence into the most significant institutions for contemporary art and science, among the most important of which were the Civitella Ranieri (Italy, 2015) and the Wissenschaftskolleg zu Berlin (Germany, 2017–2018).

He is a member of the Saxon Academy for the Arts (Germany) and a Merited Professor of the State Conservatory of Uzbekistan.

== Music ==
Vladimir Tarnopolski has written several operas, as well as many orchestral, chamber and vocal compositions. He aspires to achieve in the sound of his music a “new euphony,” (a new consonance of sound), when in the emerging “sound magma the juxtapositions between consonance and dissonance, sound and noise, harmony and timbre, acoustic and electronic instruments are alleviated.” In the opinion of one of the journalists, the composer, when making use of various stylistic elements, presumes at the same time their inner self-destructive criticism; “it inherently implies criticism in reference to it, and ultimately, it destroys itself. The music always creates the impression that it contemplates about its own sounds from an observation deck, at the same time, not only discerning the sonorities themselves, but also, what is more important, consciously operating with its meanings.”

== Selected works ==
=== Operas ===
- The Three Graces, an opera-parody in three scenes Text: Carl Maria von Weber (1988) 45' premiere: April 30, 1988, Bolshoi Hall of Shostakovich Philharmony, Leningrad, Orchestra and Choir of Culture Ministry USSR, cond. Gennady Rozhdestvensky
- Wenn die Zeit über die Ufer tritt (When Time Overflows From Its Shores, opera in three scenes Text: Ralf Günther Mohnnau after Anton Chekhov's Three Sisters, commissioned for the Munich Biennale,(1999) 90', premiere: April 27, 1999, Münchener Biennale, Staatstheater am Gärtnerplatz, conductor Ekkehard Klemm
- A True Story About Cinderella (a musical fairy tale for adults accompanied by children. For children's choir, children's orchestra, 6 narrators and professional ensemble. Text: Roald Dahl's "Revolting Rhymes" adapted by Donald Sturrock) (2003) 60', premiere: April 28, 2003, Barbican Hall, London, Centre for Young Musicians orchestra and London Schools Symphony orchestra, conductor Peter Ash
- Jenseits der Schatten (Beyond the Shadow, an opera with multimedia. Scenario: Vladimir Tarnopolski after "Cave Allegory" by Plato and "Origin of Painting from a Shadow" by Pliny. Texts: Dante Alighieri, Leonardo da Vinci, Friedrich Nietzsche. The compilation and additional fragments by Ralph Günther Mohnnau) (2006) ≈65', premiere: September 20, 2006, Beethovenfest, Kunst- und Ausstellunghalle. Opera Bonn, Palindrome Dance Company, Ensemble Musikfabrik, conductor Wolfgang Lischke. Staging — Robert Wechsler.

=== Works for orchestra/ensemble ===
- Cassandra, for large ensemble (1991) 23'
- Welt voll Irrsinn (World Full of Madness), for large ensemble (1993) 15'
- The Breath of the Exhausted Time, for orchestra (1994) 24'
- …Le vent des mots qu'il n'a pas dits (…The Wind of Unspoken Words), for cello and orchestra (1996) 15'
- Chevengur, for voice and ensemble, text by Andrey Platonov (2001) 13'
- Feux follets, for orchestra (2003) 10'
- Foucault's Pendulum, for orchestra (2004) 25'
- Eastanbul, for large ensemble (2008) 20'
- Last and Lost, for chamber ensemble (2010) 11'
- Redshift, for large orchestra and electronic (2013) 18'
- Tabula Russia, for orchestra (2015) 12'
- Blue Shift, for orchestra (2017) 20'
- Be@thoven – Invocation (after Piano Concerto No.4 by Beethoven), for orchestra (2017) 17'
- Over Drive for ensemble (2020) 8'
- Danse macabre for orchestra (2023) 15'
