= Bassoon Concerto (Neikrug) =

The Concerto for Bassoon and Orchestra is a composition for solo bassoon and orchestra in three movements by the American composer Marc Neikrug. The work was jointly commissioned by the National Symphony Orchestra, the Boston Symphony Orchestra, the Milwaukee Symphony Orchestra, and the National Arts Centre Orchestra. It was premiered in Boston November 21, 2013, with the Boston Symphony Orchestra and principal bassoonist Richard Svoboda performing under conductor Rafael Frühbeck de Burgos.

== Composition ==
The piece has a duration of roughly 20 minutes and is composed in three numbered movements.

=== Instrumentation ===
The concerto is scored solo bassoon and orchestra, comprising two flutes, two oboes, Cor anglais, two clarinets, bass clarinet, two bassoons, four French horns, trombone, tuba, three percussionists, celesta, harp, and strings.

== Reception ==
Jeremy Eichler of The Boston Globe welcomed a new bassoon concerto to the repertory, but also wrote, "Throughout the work, Neikrug’s orchestral writing gives a wide berth to the solo line, so wide in fact that the piece on Thursday felt on occasion a bit spare. Meanwhile, its derivation of thematic material from the bassoon’s own instrumental bag of tricks has an organic appeal, but also left the ear wishing at times for a bolder and more personalized specificity of sound world." Anne Midgette of The Washington Post similarly called the work "a collection of wandering phrases, starting with a movement that features juxtapositions of ascending bassoon lines and descending orchestral lines (and vice versa), and that moves on to the requisite slow movement, followed by the requisite rapid one, without ever quite taking hold of the qualities of timbre and incision for which it seems to be groping."

Elaine Schmidt of the Milwaukee Journal Sentinel was more favorable, writing, "Constructed like a conversation between bassoon and orchestra, the piece is supports the bassoon's solo passages with light, sometimes transparent orchestral sounds, contrasted with denser, bigger orchestral passages while the bassoon is not playing." Natasha Gauthier of the Ottawa Citizen also gave the work praise, saying of Neikrug, "His taut, disciplined writing — the concerto clocks in at a mean, lean 20 minutes — exploits the bassoon’s conversational quality, as well as its unusually expressive range. Neikrug mitigates the bassoon’s tendency to blend in, not cut through, with constantly judicious use of orchestral texture and colour."
