= Vytautas Montvila =

Lithuanian composer (1935–2003)

- Born: 1 June 1935; Kaunas, Lithuania
- Died: 13 July 2003 (aged 68); Vilnius, Lithuania
- Other name: Витаутас Петрович Монтвила (Russian)
- Citizenship: Lithuania
- Occupations: Composer, bassoonist, sound engineer
- Years active: 1953–2003
- Spouse: Milda Lapėnaitė

Vytautas Montvila (1 June 1935 – 13 July 2003) was a Lithuanian composer, bassoonist and sound engineer.

== Biography ==
Montvila studied bassoon at the Juozas Gruodis Music School in Kaunas, graduating in 1954. He then continued his bassoon studies with Kazimieras (Kazys) Paulauskas at the Lithuanian State Conservatory, completing his degree in 1959. Montvila performed with the Kaunas Musical Theater Orchestra 1953-54, then with the Lithuanian Opera and Ballet Orchestra 1954-58. In 1957, he won first prize at a bassoon competition in Moscow. In 1959, Montvila began working for the Lithuanian Radio and Television Committee, first as a music editor and later as a sound engineer. In 1975 he became a sound engineer for the Lithuanian Composers' Union, where he remained until 1999.

After completing his bassoon studies in 1959, Montvila remained at the conservatory to study composition with Julius Juzeliūnas until 1964. Montvila quickly established himself as one of the leading figures of the Lithuanian post-war avant-garde, embracing serial, aleatoric, twelve-tone, micropolyphonic, sonorist, and pointillist techniques. He became the first Lithuanian composer to utilize graphic notation with his piece Trikampiai (Triangles) for flute and piano (1968). Montvila also composed the earliest surviving example of Lithuanian tape music: discovered in 2016, his Juodoji pantomima (Black Pantomime) likely dates from the early 1970s. Beginning in 1968, Montvila began corresponding with fellow modernist composers outside the Soviet Union including György Ligeti, Sylvano Bussotti, Karlheinz Stockhausen, György Kurtag, John Cage, Elliott Carter, Luigi Dallapiccola and Henri Pousseur, as well as Lithuanian expatriates Vytautas Bacevičius and Jeronimas Kačinskas.

Despite his strong experimental leanings, Montvila based many of his compositions around Lithuanian folk music, which he began exploring after completing his conservatory education. His Gothic Poem for orchestra (1970) blends micropolyphony, Klangfarbenmelodie-like tone clusters, and melodies based on a pair of sutartinės, an ancient form of Lithuanian polyphonic vocal music. Montvila wrote extensively for Lithuanian folk instruments including kanklės, birbynė and skudučiai, sometimes in combination with voices, piano and other instruments. Montvila himself remarked that "[in] all of my work I strive for a contemporary Lithuanianism, since that is the most beautiful part of my work [...] The basic goal of my work, without question, is the sutartinė, which interested me because of its archaic intonational structure and the great potential of its rhythm. In my works, I attempt to disclose not just the sutartinė’s playfulness and the keenness of its rhythm, but also its melodiousness and its lyrical nature." Among Montvila's works are several dozen harmonized folk songs, as well as original works in the style of Lithuanian folk music.

Until 1990, Montvila's works were published by Sovetskiĭ Kompozitor, the publishing arm of the Union of Soviet Composers, and Vaga, the official publishing house of the Lithuanian Soviet Socialist Republic. Since the collapse of the Soviet Union, these editions have remained out of print, though many are available upon request from the Music Information Centre Lithuania. A handful of Montvila's works were also published by Karthause-Schmülling Verlag of Kamen, Germany, though these too are currently unavailable. Many of Montvila's works remain unpublished. His manuscripts are currently housed at the Lithuanian Archives of Literature and Art, fonds 117.

== Selected works ==
=== Orchestral ===
- Dramatic Poem (1963) – unfinished
- Poems of Vilnius: Triptych of symphonic poems
  - Gothic Poem (1970)
  - Choruses (1971)
  - Festive Poem (1972)
- Pagerbimas (Homage) for string orchestra (1975)
- Atgimimo simfonija (Rebirth Symphony) (1988)
- Adagio (Grave) for Julius Juzeliūnas for string orchestra (2001)

=== Concertante ===
- Bassoon concerto (1963)
- Pastorale for English horn, harp and string orchestra (1972)
- Pastorales for oboe and string orchestra (1974)
- Pavasaris (Springtime) for flute and string orchestra (1975)
- Piano concerto (1982)
- Concerto for two pianos (1986)

=== Chamber ===
- Variations for two pianos (1961)
- Sonata for violin and piano (1962)
- Suite for bassoon and piano (1964)
- three string quartets
  - String quartet no. 1 Rankos-paukščiai (Hand-Birds) (1967)
  - String quartet no. 2 (1985)
  - Ritual (1998)
- Trikampiai (Triangles) for flute and piano (1968)
- Epifaninis trio (Epiphany Trio) for piccolo, oboe and clarinet (1968) – unfinished
- two woodwind quintets
  - Quintetino (1969)
  - Quintet (1975–77)
- Horn Choruses for 4 horns (1970)
- Clarinet Chorus for 5 clarinets (1972)
- Elegy for English horn and two harps (1975)
- Andante & Allegro for oboe and piano (1976)
- Three Pastorales for oboe and piano (1979)
- Paukščių giesmės (Birdsongs) for flute, oboe and clarinet (1985)
- Visions for oboe and piano (1993)
- Ženklų kvintetas (Quintet of the Signs) for string quartet and piano (2000)
- String quintet (year unknown)

=== Solo instrumental ===
- Gamtos lyrika (Lyricism of Nature): Piano cycle, dedicated to Mikalojus Konstantinas Čiurlionis (1965)
- Cosmic Ballad for piano (1966)
- Sonorities for piano (1969)
- Two Pastoral Preludes for guitar (1973)
- Debesys. Saulės spindulys (Clouds. The Sunbeams) for piano (1973)
- five piano sonatas
  - Polėkis sonata (Flight Sonata) (1979) – draft
  - Bokštų sonata (Towers Sonata) (1979)
  - Aušros sonata (Dawn Sonata) (1984)
  - Jūros sonata (Sea Sonata) (1985)
  - Laisvės sonata (Freedom Sonata) (1994)
- Organ Sonata (1982–83)
- Mirages for piano
  - Four Mirages (1987)
  - The Fifth Mirage (1996)
  - The Sixth Mirage (1997)
- Ženklai (Signs) for piano (2001)
- Šviesa (Light) for piano (2001)

=== Vocal ===
- Bičiulystė (Amity) for mezzo soprano and piano (1966) – text by Salomėja Nėris
- Dainavos triptikas (Dainava Triptych) for mezzo soprano and piano (1966)
- Rugiapjūtės dainos (Harvest Songs) for mezzo soprano and piano (1967)
- Žemaičių dainos (Samogitian Songs) for soprano and piano (1967)
- Trys raliavimai (Three Herding Songs) for soprano and flute (1969)
- Kregždės (Swallows) for soprano, alto, clarinet and harp (1971) – text by Leonardas Gutauskas
- Laments for soprano, flute, clarinet, oboe and bassoon (1974) – Lithuanian folk text
- cantata Čiurlionis (1975) – text by Mikalojus Konstantinas Čiurlionis
- Lithuanian Cantata (1980) – Lithuanian folk text
- Žiema (Winter) for voice and orchestra (1981) – text by Ramutė Skučaitė
- Lithuanian Songs for soprano and piano (1984)
- Kalnas (The Hill) for choir (1984)
- Vizijų kantata (Cantata of Visions) (1986) – Lithuanian folk text

=== Music for folk instruments ===
- Jūra (The Sea) for birbynė and three kanklės (1971)
- Skurdutė for ten skudučiai (1972)
- Shepherd Trills for birbynė and two kanklės (1972)
- Atžagarinė for skudučiai (1972)
- Spring Preludes for birbynė and piano (1973)
- Pušys (Pines) for birbynė and three kanklės (1975)
- Pelėdžiuko sapnas (The Owl Chick's Dream) for birbynė and three kanklės (1977)
- Prelude and Short Polka for three kanklės (1978)
- Skudutė for kanklės (1978)
- Two Pieces for birbynė and kanklės (1978)
- Two Pieces for skudučiai (1978)
- Three Pastorales for birbynė and piano (1979)
- Aukuro sonata (Sonata of the Altar) for kanklės trio (1984)
- Ženklai (Signs) for birbynė and piano (1995)
- Sutartinės for two birbynė and three kanklės (2001)

=== Music for television ===
- Kaimynai (Neighbors) (1979)
