= Symphony No. 68 (Haydn) =

Symphony in four movements by Joseph Haydn

Joseph Haydn

The Symphony No. 68 in B♭ major, Hoboken I/68, is a symphony by Joseph Haydn. The symphony was composed in 1779 for Nikolaus I, Prince Esterházy. It is chronologically the last symphony by Haydn where the Minuet is second out of the four movements.

== Music ==
It is scored two oboes, two bassoons, two French horns, and strings. This is one of the first of Haydn's symphonies to contain two independent bassoon parts.

It has four movements:

1. Vivace
2. Menuetto & Trio
3. Adagio cantabile
4. Finale: Presto

In the trio of the minuet, Haydn plays games with the accents, moving the appearance of a downbeat to different places in the bar—a game he would play to even greater effect in the trio of his Oxford Symphony.

The slow movement opens with muted first violins playing a serenade-like melody over a tick-tock accompaniment in the second violins. Periodically in this section, the full tutti will double the accompaniment forte for four notes, turning the tick-tock into something of a fanfare.

The finale is a contredanse rondo with three episodes and a coda. The first episode features the bassoons, the second episode the oboes and the third episode is in stormy G minor.
