= Marc Neikrug =

American classical composer

Marc Edward Neikrug (born September 24, 1946) is a contemporary American composer, pianist, and conductor. He was born in New York City, the son of cellists George Neikrug and Olga Zundel. He is best known for a Piano Concerto (1966), the theater piece Through Roses (1980), and the opera Los Alamos (1988). Among his notable recent compositions are the orchestral song cycle Healing Ceremony (2010), his Concerto for Orchestra (2012), a Bassoon Concerto (2013), and the Canta-Concerto (2014). He studied with Giselher Klebe at the Hochschule für Musik Detmold from 1964 to 1968, and composition at Stony Brook University (M.M., 1971). In 1978 he was appointed consultant on contemporary music to the Saint Paul Chamber Orchestra. Since the late 1990s he has been artistic director of the Santa Fe Chamber Music Festival. He is also known for collaborations with violinist Pinchas Zukerman.

== Selected recordings ==
Camille Saint-Saëns, Sonata No. 1 in D minor for violin and piano, César Franck, Sonata in A for violin and piano, Pinchas Zukerman, violin, Marc Neikrug, piano. CD Philips 1984.
