= Chiel Meijering =

Dutch composer

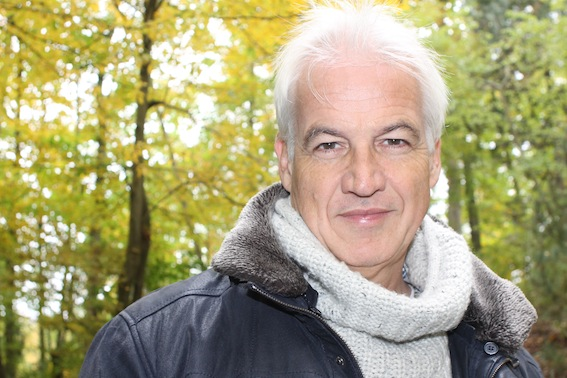

Michael Maria "Chiel" Meijering (born 15 June 1954) is a Dutch composer. He studied composition with Ton de Leeuw, percussion with Jan Labordus and Jan Pustjens, and piano at the Conservatorium van Amsterdam. He composed over 1000 works.

Meijering has a fondness for outrageous titles. Some examples include "I Hate Mozart" (for flute, alto saxophone, harp and violin); "I've Never Seen a Straight Banana" (for alto saxophone, marimba, piano, harp, and violin); "If the Camels Don't Get You, the Fatimas Must!" (for solo violin); and "Background-Music for Non-Entertainment Use in Order to Cover Unwanted Noise" (for four saxophones).

== Career ==
=== 2010s ===
Meijering transcribed 55 recorder concertos written for Dan Laurin between 2012 and 2015 for bassoon and string orchestra. These multi-movement works could be described as encore pieces or concertinos. On 29 October 2016, "Whatever Lies Ahead" for 12 cellos was premiered in Amsterdam by the 12 Cellists of the Berlin Philharmonic.

Between July 2016 and March 2018, Meijering composed 117 bassoon concertos and chamber concertos for bassoonist Kathleen McLean, Professor at the Jacobs School of Music, Indiana University, and co-principal bassoon of the World Orchestra for Peace. These works are in a one movement form, shifting styles within each piece with influences of folk, jazz, avant-garde, funk and classical. Many themes came from Meijering's existing operatic scores and sketches.

In 2017, McLean received a grant from FPK Holland for a new commission by Meijering for 12 bassoons and strings entitled "The Reed Which Bends in the Wind," to be premiered in Bloomington Indiana on 31 March 2018, and later in Granada, Spain at the International Double Reed Society Conference, 29 August 2018 with McLean and other bassoon artists. In 2018, Meijering composed several new pieces for bassoon and piano available at Donemus Publishing.

== Works ==
- I hate Mozart
- Niet te stuiten
- Twee eieren, zuurstok en spinrag
- Two men and a lady

=== Operas ===
- Alzheimer Opera
- The Last Days of Mankind (1988)
- St. Louis Blues
