= Vladislav Shoot =

Russian-British composer (1941–2022)

- Владислав Шуть
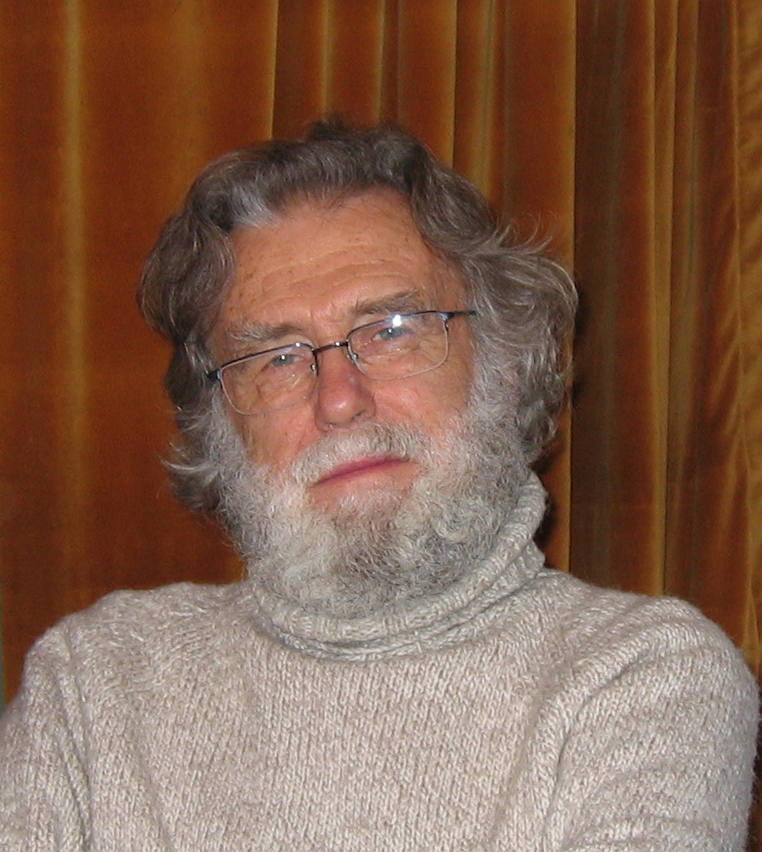
- Shoot in 2008
- Born: Vladislav Alekseyevich Shut; 3 March 1941; Voznesensk, Mykolaiv Oblast, Soviet Union
- Died: 9 March 2022 (aged 81)
- Education: Gnessin Music Institute
- Occupation: Composer
- Years active: 1967–2000s
- Employers: Sovetsky Kompozitor; Dartington Hall
- Organization: Association for Contemporary Music
- Style: Contemporary classical music
- Spouse: Irina Karpey (m. 1970)
- Website: www.vladislavshoot.com

Vladislav Alekseyevich Shoot (Note: Also spelled Chout, Schut, Sciut, Shut or Szut) (Russian: Владислав Алексеевич Шуть, romanised: Vladislav Alekseyevich Shut; 3 March 1941 – 9 March 2022) was a Russian-British composer of contemporary classical music. Born in Voznesensk, Soviet Union, now Ukraine, he moved to the United Kingdom in the early 1990s, settling on the artists' estate of Dartington Hall.

== Biography ==
Shoot was born Vladislav Shut in Voznesensk, Soviet Union, to Valentina (née Nizovaya) and Alexei Shut, a navy officer. He was raised in Sevastopol, where he attended School N14.

Shoot studied composition with Nikolai Peiko at the Gnessin Music Institute in Moscow, graduating in 1967. From 1967 to 1982, he worked as the music editor at the Sovetsky Kompozitor publishers in Moscow. In 1982, he turned to freelance composing, earning his living by writing film scores. In 1990, Shoot – together with a small group of Moscow composers headed by Edison Denisov – founded the Association for Contemporary Music, a revival of a post-Revolutionary avant-garde composers' association of the same name.

In 1992, he came to Dartington Hall, England, as a composer-in-residence, in which capacity he served until 1995, and remained a resident of the estate. Shoot's music is published by M. P. Belaieff – Edition Peters (Frankfurt-am-Main) and Schott (Mainz). Individual works have also been published by Boosey & Hawkes and Hans Sikorski.

He married the artist Irina Karpey in 1970. His son, Eliahu "Eli" Shoot, is also a composer (teaching at Tulane University), and his daughter, Veronika "Nika" Shoot, is a pianist.

Shoot died on 9 March 2022, aged 81.

== Music ==
Shoot's works were met with much admiration in the West from the 1980s onward. He preferred smaller ensembles, up to a chamber orchestra, which he tied into sound compositions or groups of overlapping sound layers. Even his symphonies, excluding the High Cross Symphony (1998), are chamber symphonies. He retained serial processes, used post-Romantic elements, and quoted composers of the past, with Alban Berg as the clearest influence. Shoot allowed performers of his works a certain freedom of interpretation within the bounds of a controlled aleatoric technique.

His music has been performed at numerous venues and festivals throughout Europe, as well as in South Korea and the United States. The music he wrote in the UK has been performed by leading British ensembles and orchestras, including the BBC Symphony Orchestra, the Philharmonia Orchestra and Sinfonia 21. An 80th birthday celebration concert took place on 29 June 2021 at St George's, Bloomsbury, in London.

== Selected works ==
=== Orchestral ===
- Sinfonia da Camera No. 3 for flute, oboe and two ensembles (percussion, strings), 1978
- Romantic Messages for flute, bassoon, prepared piano and string orchestra, 1979
- Largo Sinfonia for organ and small orchestra (15 players), 1981
- Warum? for small orchestra (15 players), 1986
- Ex Animo for large orchestra, 1988
- Sinfonia da Camera No. 4 for tam-tam and strings, 1992
- Sinfonia da Camera No. 5 for small orchestra (16 players), 1992
- Serenade for string orchestra, 1995
- Divertimento for recorder, vibraphone and string orchestra, 1997
- High-Cross Symphony for large orchestra, 1998
- Sinfonia da Camera No. 6 for string orchestra and percussion, 2005

=== Chamber music ===
- Sonata-fantasia for violin and piano, 1969, revised 2001
- Cuckoo's Rhymes (20 Miniatures for Children) for violin and piano, 1969, revised 1999
- Sonata for cello, 1970, revised 1999
- Youth Album for violin and piano, 1971, revised 1999
- Sinfonia da Camera No. 1 for four cellos, double bass and timpani, 1973
- Sinfonia da Camera No. 2 for flute, oboe, clarinet, saxophone, bassoon, viola, cello and double bass, 1975
- Five Easy Pieces for French horn and piano, 1976, revised 2001
- Sonata Breve for flute, 1977
- Trio for bassoon, cello and percussion, 1978
- Solo per Fagotto for bassoon, 1978
- Metamorphosis for saxophone, harp, double bass and percussion, 1979
- Trio for two clarinets and bass clarinet, 1982
- Parable for six percussion, 1983
- Espressivo for flute, oboe, violin, cello and piano, 1984
- Epitaph for French horn, two trumpets, trombone and tuba, 1984
- Mini-partita for viola and piano, 1987
- Four Versions for bassoon and string quartet, 1990 (also arranged for bassoon, violin, viola and cello, 1996)
- Offering for violin, cello and piano, 1991
- Serenade for string quartet, 1994
- Pantomime for flute and harpsichord, 1995
- Con Passione for string quartet and piano, 1995
- Amoroso for clarinet and string quartet, 1996
- Chaconne for accordion, 1999
- Pastorale for flute, oboe, clarinet, bassoon and piano, 2002
- Eternal Rest for three percussion, 2002
- Suite for string quartet, 2003
- Three Encounters with Shostakovich for clarinet, horn, string quartet, piano and percussion, 2006

=== Choral ===
- She came and went (text by James Russell Lowell) for mixed chorus, 2001 (also version for mixed chorus and soprano recorder, 2001)
- Two Holy Sonnets (text by John Donne) for mixed chorus, 2003

=== Vocal ===
- Two songs of Robert Burns (translated by Samuil Marshak) for mezzo-soprano and piano, 1964, revised 2002
- Six Poems by Sergei Gorodetsky for high voice and piano, 1970
- Gleam of Light (text by Boris Pasternak) for middle voice and piano, 1988
- Vorgefühl (text by Rainer Maria Rilke) for high voice, two clarinets, viola, cello and double bass, 1993
- Four Songs on Words by P. B. Shelley for soprano and string quartet, 1994
- Three Songs on Words by Osip Mandelstam for high voice, flute, clarinet and string quartet, 1994
- Day and Night (text by Fyodor Tyutchev) for high voice, recorder and string quartet, 2000
- The Miller's Daughter (text from an English folk ballad) for soprano, clarinet and percussion, 2001

=== Piano ===
- Silhouettes, 1973
- Sonatina, 1974, revised 2002
- Children's Album, 1975, revised 1995

=== Organ ===
- Confession, 1993, revised 2000

== Films scored ==
- Privet s fronta (1983) (TV) Привет с фронта "Note from the Front"
- Tayna zemli (1985) Тайна земли "The Earth's Secret"
- Karusel na bazarnoy ploshchadi (1986) Карусель на базарной площади "Carousel at the Bazaar Square"
- Pro lyubov, druzhbu i sud'bu (1987) Про любовь, дружбу и судьбу "Of Love, Friendship and Fate"
- Amulanga (1987)
- Korabl (1988) Корабль "The Ship"
- Mest (1989) Месть "Revenge", ("The Red Flute": International/English title)
- Karyer (1990) Карьер "Sand-Pit"
- Garem Stepana Guslyakova (1990) Гарем Степана Гуслякова "Stepan Ghusliakov's Harem"
- Tsareubiytsa (1991) Цареубийца "The Assassin of the Tsar"
- Lyuk (1991) Люк "The Hatch"
- Serebryannye Lozhki (1991) Серебряные Ложки "Silver Spoons"
- Sumashedshaya Liubov (1992) Сумасшедшая Любовь "Crazy Love"

== Discography ==
- Romantic Messages (Melodiya, 1980)[LP] – with Valery Popov, bassoon; Valery Polyansky / Moscow Conservatory Orchestra
- Four Versions (Mezhdunarodnaya Kniga MK 417036, 1991) – with Valery Popov, bassoon; Vladimir Ponkin / Moscow Contemporary Music Ensemble
- Warum? (Olympia: OCD 283, 1991) – with Alexey Vinogradov / Moscow Contemporary Music Ensemble
- Trio (Olympia: OCD 297, 1993) – with Valery Popov, bassoon; Natalia Savinova, cello; Alexander Suvorov, percussion
- Three Songs on Words by Osip Mandelstam (Explicit! Records: E! 99004, 2000) – with Katia Kichigina, soprano; Oxalys Ensemble
- Ex Animo; Sinfonia da Camera No. 5; High-Cross Symphony (Sojuz: CD0001, 2003) – with Vladimir Ponkin / Rachmaninov Symphony Orchestra
- Four Songs on Words by P. B. Shelley (Claves: CD 50–2303, 2003) – with Elena Vassilieva, soprano; Quatuor Sine Nomine
- Miniature Partita (Opus 35: OP3501, 2008) – with Filip Davidse, saxophone; Naomi Tamura, piano – in "The Soviet Saxophone"

== Bibliography ==
- Holopova, Valentina. Secrets of the Moscow Composition School in Vladislav Shoot's "Pure Music" in: «Ex oriente...III»: Eight Composers from the former USSR, ed. V. Tsenova (studia slavica musicologica, vol. 31) (Berlin: Ernst Kuhn, 1997), ISBN 3-928864-92-0
- Lobanova, Marina. Musical Styla and Genre: History and Modernity (Amsterdam: Harwood Academic Publishers, 2000), pp. 167–9.
- McBurney, Gerard. "Vladislav Shoot", The New Grove Dictionary of Music and Musicians ed. S. Sadie and J. Tyrrell (London: Macmillan, 2001), vol. 23, pp. 275–6.
