= René Gerber =

Swiss composer (1908–2006)

René Gerber (29 June 1908; Travers, Switzerland – 21 October 2006; Bevaix) was a Swiss composer. A student of Paul Dukas and Nadia Boulanger, among others, he taught at the Collège Latin (Neuchâtel) and became the director of the Conservatoire de Musique de Neuchâtel.

An exponent of neoclassicism and “French clarity”, his compositions follow traditional forms. He composed symphonic music (including the orchestral suite "The Old Farmer's Almanach"), 15 concertos, chamber music, vocal music, piano music, a work for organ, two operas inspired by Shakespeare plays (Romeo and Juliet, Midsummer Night’s Dream).

The vast majority of his works, which currently represent more than twenty albums, have been produced and published by the Swiss label VDE-GALLO Records.
