= Nikolai Sidelnikov =

Russian composer

- Born: Никола́й Никола́евич Сиде́льников; 5 June 1930; Tver, Soviet Union
- Died: 20 June 1992 (aged 62); Moscow, Russia
- Resting place: Troyekurovskoye Cemetery
- Education: Moscow Conservatory
- Occupations: Composer, Musical pedagogue

Nikolai Nikolayevich Sidelnikov (Russian: Никола́й Никола́евич Сиде́льников; June 5, 1930, Tver – June 20, 1992) was a Russian Soviet composer.

Sidelnikov studied with E. O. Messner and Yuri Shaporin at the Moscow Conservatory. He taught at the Moscow Conservatory where he was a professor from 1981. Among his pupils were Audronė Žigaitytė, Vyacheslav Artemov, Eduard Artemyev, Dmitri Smirnov, Vladimir Tarnopolsky, Vladimir Martynov, Anton Rovner, Sergey Pavlenko, Ivan Glebovich Sokolov and Vladimir Bitkin. See: List of music students by teacher: R to S#Nikolai Sidelnikov.

His works include operas:

- Alen'kiy Tsvetochek (The Scarlet Flower, after S. Aksakov, 1974)
- Chertogon (opera dilogy after Nikolai Leskov: Zagul, Pokhmelye, 1978–1981)
- Beg (The Run after Mikhail Bulgakov, 1987)

a ballet:

- Stepan Razin

and also: 6 symphonies, an oratorio, cantatas, choral, chamber and vocal music.

- Russkie skazki (Русские сказки — The Russian Fairy Tales, 1968) - a concert for 12 players is one of his most notable compositions.
