= Romance for bassoon (Elgar) =

1910 composition by Edward Elgar

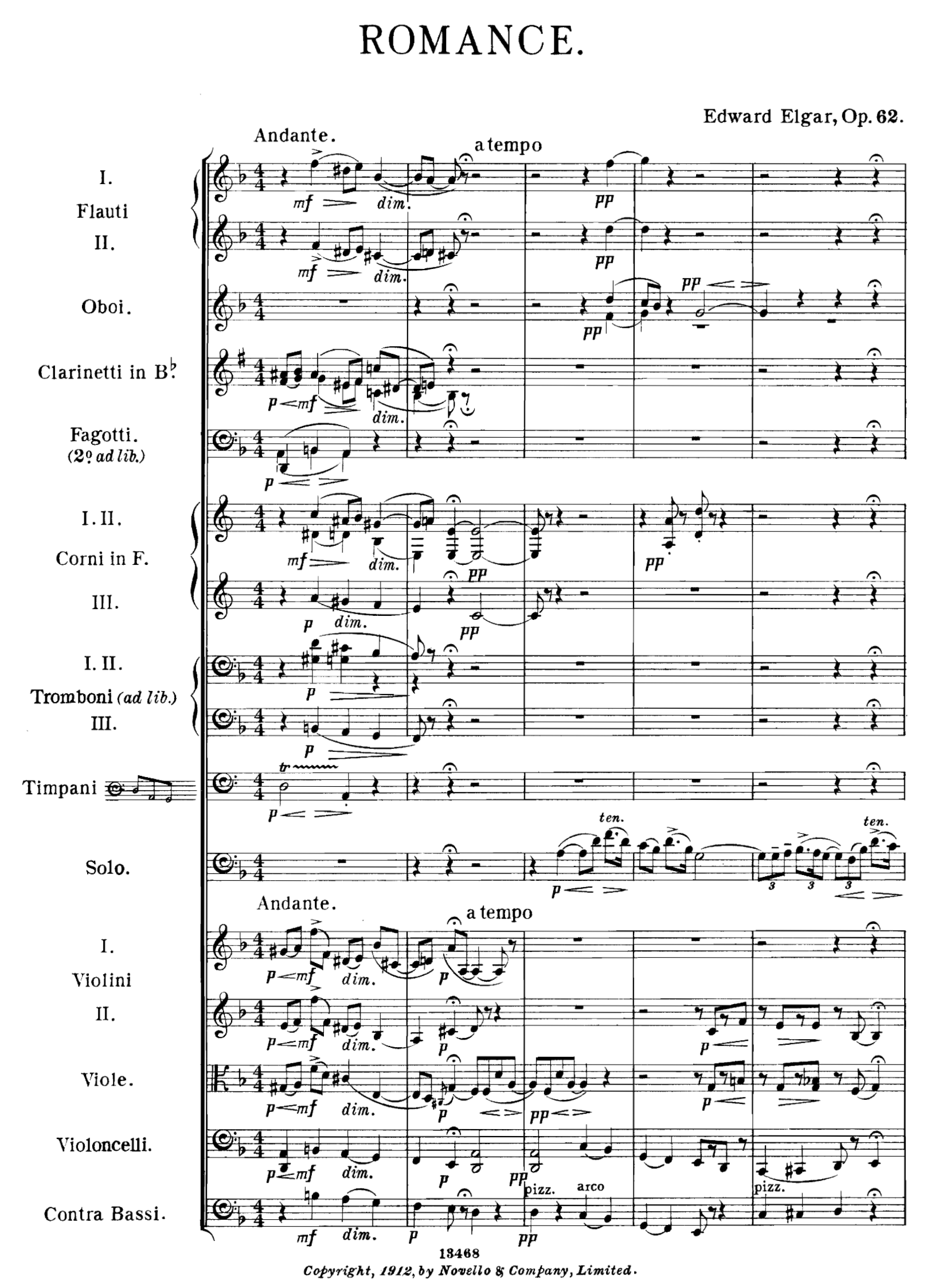
Romance, Op.62 (Elgar, Edward).

The Romance, in D minor, Op 62, is a short work for bassoon and orchestra by Edward Elgar. It exists also in a transcription for cello and orchestra made by the composer. Both the bassoon and cello versions date from 1909–10. It is also published with the orchestral part reduced to a piano accompaniment.

The Romance was composed for the principal bassoonist of the London Symphony Orchestra, Edwin F James, who gave the first performance in February 1911 at Hereford, with the composer conducting. The cello transcription remained unplayed until 1985.

The work was composed between two of Elgar's most large-scale works, the Violin Concerto and the Second Symphony, and is a contrastingly short and gentle piece, lasting under eight minutes in performance. The Elgar expert Michael Kennedy remarks of it that it portrays the bassoon as poet and singer rather than comedian.

== Instrumentation ==
The work is scored for an orchestra consisting of, besides the solo bassoon, 2 flutes, 2 oboes, 2 clarinets in B♭, 2 bassoons (2nd ad lib) 3 horns in F, 3 trombones ad lib, timpani, and strings.

== Recordings ==
Both versions have been recorded.

- Michael Chapman with the Northern Sinfonia conducted by Sir Neville Marriner in 1970 (EMI)
- Graham Salvage and the Hallé Orchestra conducted by Mark Elder, issued in 2004 on the orchestra's own label
- The cello alternative was recorded for EMI by Julian Lloyd Webber and the London Symphony Orchestra conducted by Sir Charles Mackerras in 1986
