= Marc Vaubourgoin =

French composer (1907–1983)

Jean Joseph Marc Vaubourgoin (19 March 1907 in Caudéran (today a western neighbourhood of Bordeaux) – 1 April 1983 in the 10th arrondissement of Paris) was a 20th-century French composer.

== Biography ==
Marc Vaubourgoin's father, Julien Fernand Vaubourgoin, a composer and teacher, gave him his first music lessons. Marc entered the Conservatoire de Bordeaux and then completed his studies at the Conservatoire de Paris with André Gedalge, Noël Gallon (counterpoint and fugue), Charles-Marie Widor and Paul Dukas (composition). In 1930, he won the 2nd Grand Prix de Rome for his cantata Actéon.

He directed the Conservatoire de Nantes from 1937 to 1943, then became conductor for the Radiodiffusion française. In 1954, he became director of the musicology department of the ORTF. As such, he was interested in exhuming works by composers from the 18th century that had been forgotten until then, such as Hippolyte et Aricie by Jean-Philippe Rameau, while baroque music was not yet in fashion.

Marc Vaubourgoin had two sons who also distinguished themselves in the field of the Arts: Jean-Raphaël Vaubourgoin, an architect and Thierry Vaubourgoin, a painter.

== Works ==
- Impressions de Cornouaille:
  - Saint-Michel de Braspartz
  - Le marais sous la lune d’avril
  - Confort. La roue du bonheur
- Trois Chansons de Clément Marot for Choir a cappella
- Conte de Noël, Ballet after René Dumesnil
- Wind quintet (1932)
- Trio for oboe, clarinet and bassoon (1936)
- Symphonie n°1 (1938)
- Prélude, Fanfare et Danse, for orchestra (1945)
- Symphonie n°2 (1955)
- Piano sonata (1967)
- Concerto for bassoon (1964)
- Concerto for piano
- Introduction, variation et rondeau for wood quartet soloists (flute, oboe, clarinet and bassoon) and orchestra
- Concerto for harpsichord (1968)
- Conte de Noël, ballet (unpublished)
- Douze canons for 2 bassoons (1978)
