= Bassoon Concerto (Rouse) =

Concerto by Christopher Rouse

The Bassoon Concerto is a composition for solo bassoon and orchestra by the American composer Christopher Rouse. The work was commissioned by the New Jersey Symphony Orchestra, the St. Louis Symphony, the Sydney Symphony Orchestra, and the Lausanne Chamber Orchestra and was completed on February 2, 2017. It received its world premiere on November 16, 2018, by the St. Louis Symphony and their principal bassoonist Andrew Cuneo under the conductor Cristian Măcelaru in Powell Hall, St. Louis.

== Composition ==
The composition has a duration of approximately 20 minutes and is cast in the traditional three-movement (fast-slow-fast) concerto form. In the score program note, the composer state that the work "is meant in large part simply to provide pleasure. I realize that such an intent is now looked upon with suspicion is some quarters, but I have never felt that every work of art is required to plumb the depths and secrets of human existence. Sometimes twenty minutes spent in the company of, I hope, a genial companion can be the most meaningful way of passing time." He added, "I did, however, try to resist making too much of the bassoon's oft-heralded role as the 'clown' of the orchestra. While there are occasional forays into the more 'comical' lower range of the instrument, more time is spent in the middle and upper tessitura of the bassoon, and melodic lines often tend toward the lyrical. Overall there is a collegial relationship between soloist and orchestra, unlike the common 'soloist against the orchestra' paradigm of many romantic era concerti."

=== Instrumentation ===
The work is scored for solo bassoon and a small orchestra consisting of two flutes, two oboes, two clarinets, two additional bassoons ("in order to provide the occasional potential for building a sort of 'mega-bassoon'"), two horns, timpani, one percussionist, harp, and strings.

== Reception ==
Reviewing the world premiere, Sarah Bryan Miller of the St. Louis Post-Dispatch described the performance as "a resounding success" and wrote, "The composer rang all the changes in mood and style, but kept things accessible. The concerto started out playfully, moved into mystery, explored some jagged rhythms; there were dialogues with those other bassoons, with the winds, the harp and other instruments, for an engaging whole."
