= Bassoon Concerto (Mozart) =

1774 bassoon concerto by W. A. Mozart

- by W. A. Mozart
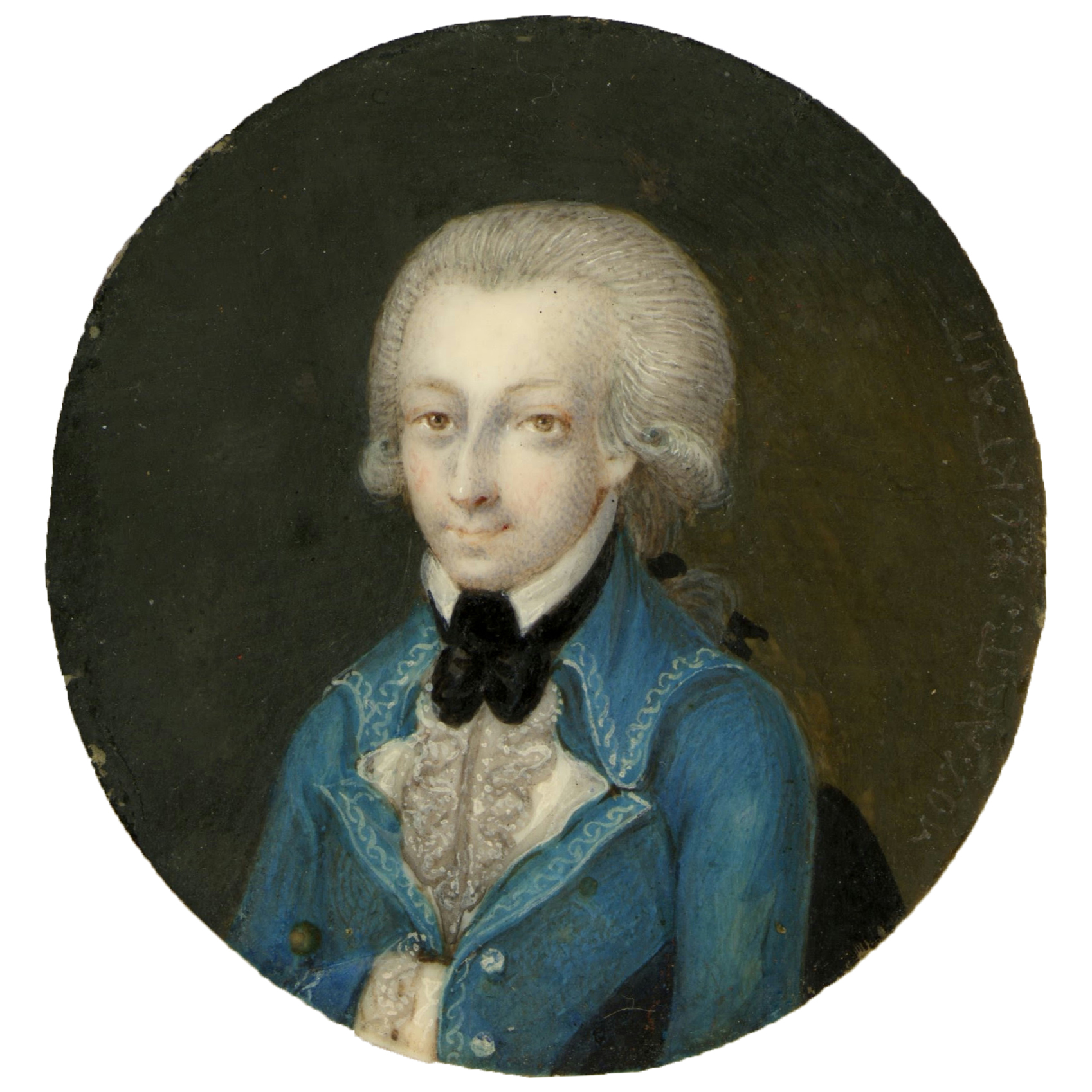
- 1773 miniature of Mozart
- Key: B♭ major
- Catalogue: K. 191/186e
- Genre: Concerto
- Style: Classical period
- Composed: 1774
- Movements: Three (Allegro, Andante ma adagio, Rondo: tempo di menuetto)
- Scoring: Bassoon; orchestra

The Bassoon Concerto in B♭ major, K. 191/186e, is a bassoon concerto written in 1774 by Wolfgang Amadeus Mozart. It is the most often performed and studied piece in the entire bassoon repertory. Nearly all professional bassoonists will perform the piece at some stage in their career, and it is probably the most commonly requested piece in orchestral auditions – it is usually requested that the player perform excerpts from the concerto's first two movements in every audition.

Although the autograph score is lost, the exact date of its completion is known: 4 June 1774.

Mozart wrote the bassoon concerto when he was 18 years old, and it was his first concerto for a wind instrument. Although it is believed that it was commissioned by an aristocratic amateur bassoon player Thaddäus Freiherr von Dürnitz, who owned seventy-four works by Mozart, this is a claim that is supported by little evidence. Scholars believe that Mozart may have written five bassoon concertos, but that only the first has survived.

== Instrumentation ==
The concerto is scored for a solo bassoon and an orchestra consisting of 2 oboes, 2 horns in B♭ (sometimes transcribed for F), violin I/II, viola, and cello and double bass doubling the bass line.

== Structure ==
1. Allegro
Performed by the Skidmore College Orchestra

I. Allegro^{a}

II. Andante ma adagio^{a}

III. Rondo Tempo di Menuetto^{a}
^{a} Performed by Arthur Grossman, bassoon, with the Seventh Army Symphony Orchestra (1957)

The piece is divided into three movements:

1. Allegro
2. Andante ma adagio (F major)
3. Rondo: Tempo di Menuetto

The first movement is written in the common sonata form with an orchestral introduction. The second movement is a slow and lyrical sonata without development that contains a theme which was later featured in the Countess's aria "Porgi, amor" at the beginning of the second act of Mozart's opera Le nozze di Figaro. The final movement is in rondo form.
