= Sergei Pavlenko =

British painter

Sergei Pavlenko (born 1953) is a portrait painter of Russian origin and now based in Britain.

== Biography ==
Pavlenko graduated in Painting from St. Petersburg Academy of Fine Arts in 1988. He studied under Boris Ugarov, President of the Academy of Fine Arts of the USSR, and was nominated for the Gold Medal.

In 1989, Sergei Pavlenko moved to the West, received immediate recognition and began to paint and exhibit his work in London and the USA. Since then he has been living and working in London and is now a British citizen. Now an established portrait painter, both in Europe and the United States, Sergei Pavlenko’s work is in constant demand. His portrait of The Queen, completed in 2000, was reportedly the Queen's favourite portrait since her coronation. It was personally unveiled by the queen.

The painting received impressive coverage by the world press and television and a postage stamp was subsequently made in the UK.

In 2004, Sergei Pavlenko had a one-man exhibition in London in the Russian Embassy and in Moscow in the British Embassy, with over a thousand guests attending the Private View. Four TV channels covered the event and numerous articles and reviews on the subject appeared in newspapers and magazines. In Russia, Sergei Pavlenko’s name has been added to the list of highly distinguished emigrants and is next to the ballet dancer Anna Pavlova. In Britain, Channel 4 of the UK Television showed a film about Sergei Pavlenko and his portraits.

Sergei Pavlenko was awarded a commission to paint a large-scale picture of The Queen meeting with Princes William and Harry at the Royal Military Academy Sandhurst.

== Selected exhibitions ==
- 2008 Frost and Reed Gallery, London
- 2004 One-man show, The British Embassy, Moscow.
- 2004 One-man show, The Russian Embassy, London.
- Andean Gallery, Cork Street, London.
- Andreeva Portrait Gallery, Santa Fe, USA.
- “Artlondon”, Contemporary Art Fair, London.
- Olympia Fine Art and Antiques Fair.
- 2000 20th Century British Art Fair, London.
- Royal Academy Summer Exhibition.
- Royal Society of Portrait Painters, Mall Gallery, London.
- 1989, 93,07 Royal Institute of Oil Painters, London.
- Portrait Commissions, Henry Wyndham Art Gallery, London.
- David Ker Gallery, London.
- Kertesz Fine Arts Gallery, San Francisco, USA.
- Royal West of England Academy of Arts.
- Art Expo-90, Los Angeles, California, USA.

== Commissions and collections ==
- The Prince of Wales
- Prince Ernst of Hanover
- Prince Nicholas Romanov
- Princess Maria Gabriella of Savoy
- John Spencer-Churchill, 11th Duke of Marlborough
- Hugh FitzRoy, 11th Duke of Grafton
- David Manners, 11th Duke of Rutland
- David Ogilvy, 13th Earl of Airlie
- John Grimston, 7th Earl of Verulam
- Brown University, USA
- Mr Crispin Odey
- Cazenove Group plc.
- The Worshipful Company of Drapers
- The Earl and Countess of Dalhousie
- Edward Stanley, 19th Earl of Derby
- Sir Nicholas Mander, 4th Baronet
- Mr Rudolf Oetker (Germany).
- Mr Lee Bass (USA).
- Robber de Balkany (France).
- Mr Carlo Bonomy (Italy).
- Mr John Goulandris (Greece).
- Rudolf von Ribbentrop (Germany).
- Count Gustaf Douglas (Sweden).
- Vicomte and Vicomtesse de Ribb (France).
- Sir Evelyn Robert de Rothschild
- Alfred Taubman (USA).
- Mr Fridtjof Lorentsen (Norway).
- Mr Anthony Lunn.
- Count Knut Winterfeld (Denmark).
- Lord Younger (former Secretary of Defence).
- 12th Lancers Regiment
- Sir Jack Stewart-Clark
- Mr Michael Stone.
- Mr Salah Hawila.
- Colonel Hamilton-Russell.
- Colonel Peter Rodgers.
- Captain John Macdonald-Buchunan.
- Dr August Oetker (Germany).
- Mr William Worsley.
- Sir Jeoffry Rose (RAC Club).
