= The Five Sacred Trees =

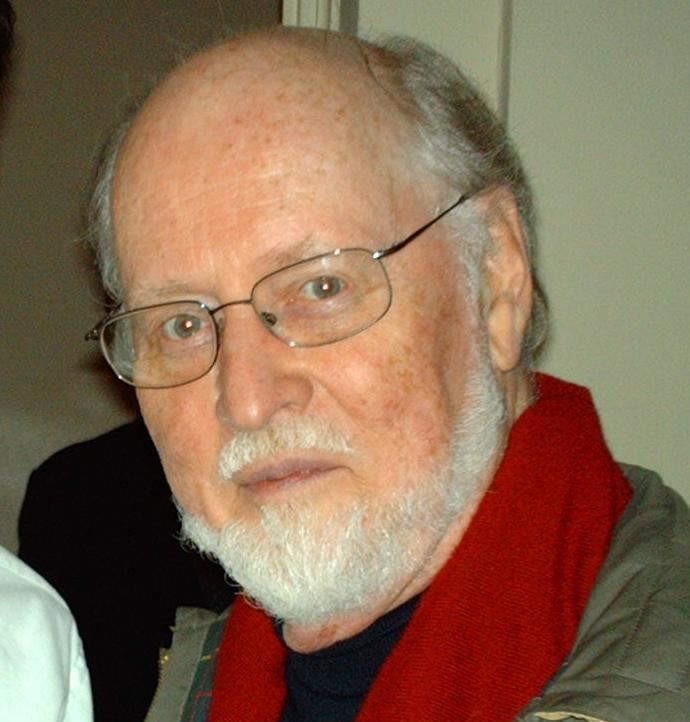
John Williams in 2006

The Five Sacred Trees is a concerto by American composer John Williams. It was written for Judith LeClair, the principal bassoonist of the New York Philharmonic in 1995, to honor the orchestra's 150th anniversary. The first performance was given by LeClair and the New York Philharmonic under Kurt Masur on April 12 of that year. The orchestra consists of three flutes and piccolo, two oboes and English horn, two clarinets and bass clarinet, two bassoons and contrabassoon, four horns, three trumpets, three trombones and tuba, timpani, harp, piano, celesta, percussion and strings. Performance time is approximately 26 minutes. Inspiration for the work also comes from the writings of British poet and novelist Robert Graves.

== Movements ==
The work is composed of five movements, each representing a tree from ancient Celtic mythology.

=== I. Eó Mugna ===
The first movement of the concerto is Eó Mugna, named after the oak. It opens with a long bassoon solo that lends solemnity to the piece.

Eó Mugna, the great oak, whose roots extend to Connia's Well in the "otherworld," stands guard over what is the source of the River Shannon and the font of all wisdom. The well is probably the source of Mugna and the sacred well.

— John Williams

=== II. Tortan ===
The second movement is Tortan, the tree associated with magic, especially witchcraft. This movement features both the bassoon and the violin.

Tortan is a tree that has been associated with witches, and as a result, the fiddle appears, sawing away as it is conjoined with the music of the bassoon. The Irish bodhrán drum assists.

— John Williams

=== III. Eó Rossa ===
The third movement, Eó Rossa, is named after the yew. This tree had power over destruction and rebirth. It opens with a long harp solo.

The Tree of Ross (or Eó Rosa) is a yew, and although the yew is often referred to as a symbol of death and destruction, The Tree of Ross is often the subject of much rhapsodizing in the literature. It is referred to as "a mother's good," "Diadem of the Angels," and "faggot of the sages." Hence the lyrical character of this movement, wherein the bassoon oncants [sic] and is accompanied by the harp!

— John Williams

=== IV. Craeb Uisnig ===
The fourth movement represents Craeb Uisnig, the ash. The ash was typically associated with strife. It is the shortest and least melodic movement.

Craeb Uisnig is an ash and has been described by Robert Graves as a source of strife. Thus, a ghostly battle, where all that is heard as the phantoms struggle is the snapping of twigs on the forest floor.

— John Williams

=== V. Dathi ===
The last movement is Dathi, named after tree that was the muse. The movement is slow and melancholic, featuring the flute as well as the bassoon. There is no gap between movements four and five.

Dathi, which purportedly exercised authority over the poets, and was the last tree to fall, is the subject for the close of the piece. The bassoon soliloquizes as it ponders the secrets of the trees.

— John Williams

== Reception ==
Reviewing a recording of the work, Lawrence Johnson of the Chicago Tribune praised the piece, remarking, "In a broad five-movement canvas, Williams explores a variety of lightly contrasted, mostly ruminative moods, and there is a quiet mystery and spacious quality to this music that compels attention." Andrew Achenbach of Gramophone similarly observed, "Williams has penned a highly imaginative, impeccably crafted score which will surely give great pleasure to many."

== Recordings ==
The Five Sacred Trees was recorded in 1997 with Williams leading LeClair and the London Symphony Orchestra. This recording was published by Sony Classical Records, and also featured Toru Takemitsu's Tree Line, Tobias Picker's Old and Lost Rivers, and Alan Hovhaness's Symphony No. 2 Mysterious Mountain.

== See also ==
- List of compositions by John Williams
