= Yuri Kasparov =

Russian composer (born 1955)

Yuri Sergeyevich Kasparov
- Юрий Серге́евич Каспа́ров
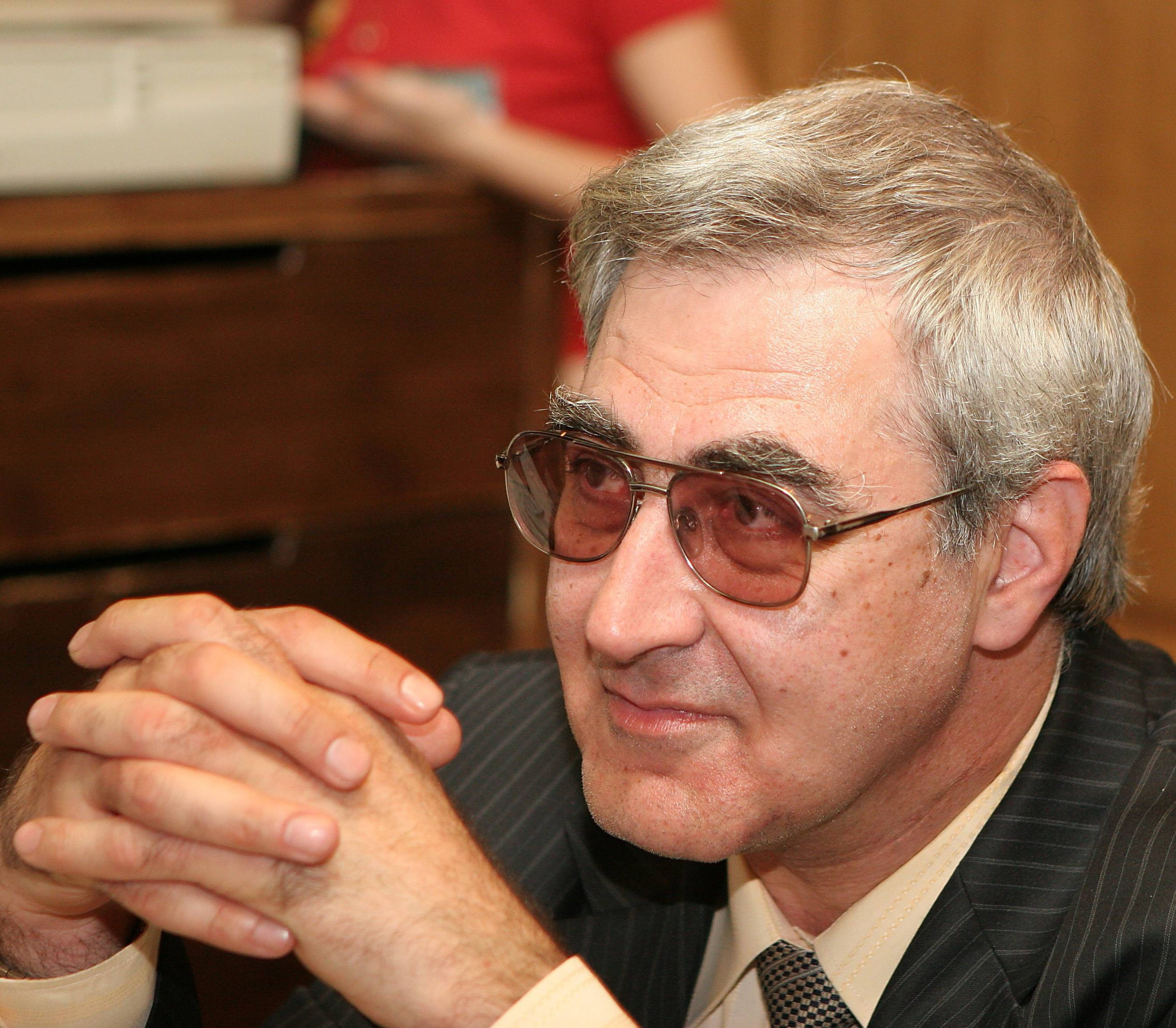
- Yuri Kasparov in 2009
- Born: June 8, 1955 (age 71); Moscow, Russian SFSR, USSR
- Education: Moscow Power Engineering Institute
- Occupations: Composer, music teacher, professor

Yuri Sergeyevich Kasparov (born 8 June 1955, in Moscow, Russian: Юрий Серге́евич Каспа́ров—his name is variously transliterated) is a Russian composer, music teacher and a professor at the Moscow Conservatory where he had studied for his doctorate under Edison Denisov. Under the patronage of Denisov, he founded the Moscow Contemporary Music Ensemble in 1990 and is its artistic director. He is the chairman of the Russian section of the International Society for Contemporary Music.

== Life ==
In 1978, Kasparov graduated from the Moscow Power Engineering Institute with a degree in engineering. He graduated with a second degree in music from the Moscow Tchaikovsky Conservatory (usually called simply the Moscow Conservatory) in 1984 and went on to complete his post-graduate studies there in 1991. Between 1985 and 1989, he worked for the Russian State Central Studio of Documentary Films as editor-in-chief for music.

== Music ==
Kasparov has argued "that the whole tradition of Russian music is too dependent on extra-musical symbolism and association (whether religious, political or nationalistic) and that Russian music of time would benefit from becoming 'purer', more concerned with itself for its own sake, as in Kasparov's opinion, Western music is. This, Kasparov argues, would lead to Soviet musicians being less isolated."

Ensemble Modern, Radio France and the Stavanger Symphony Orchestra have all commissioned works from Kasparov and his music has featured in the Tokyo Summer Festival, the Warsaw Autumn festival and Radio France's Festival Présences. His music has been recorded by the BBC National Orchestra of Wales, the National Radio Orchestra of Romania, and Ensemble Contrechamps of Switzerland, and has featured on CDs released on the Olympia and Harmonia Mundi labels.

== Awards ==
In 1985, his Symphony No. 1, Guernica, was awarded first prize in the All-Union competition in Moscow and in 1989, Ave Maria was awarded first prize in the Guido d'Arezzo competition. In 1996, Effet de nuit was awarded Grand Prix in the Henri Dutilleux competition.

In 2007, Kasparov was awarded Honored Art Worker of Russia by order of the Russian President; in 2008, he was awarded Chevalier dans L'ordre des Arts et des Lettres by the Minister of Culture of France.

In 2015 he was awarded Worker of Culture of Kazakhstan ("The Perfection in Culture").

== List of compositions ==
This list of works is a reformatted translation of the Russian Wikipedia list.

=== Orchestra ===
- Symphony No. 1 Guernica (1984). First performance – June 1984; Moscow
- Symphony No. 2 Kreutzer-Sinfonie (1987). First performance – January 1987; Yaroslavl
- Symphony No. 3 L'Ecclésiaste, (1999). First performance – March 2000; Tours (France)
- Symphony No. 4 Notre Dame (2008). First performance – November 2008; Moscow
- Logos, Concerto for orchestra (1993)
- Genesis, micro-symphony (1989). First performance – January 1994; Cardiff (United Kingdom)
- Lincos, sequence for orchestra (1988). First performance – April 1990; Norrköping (Sweden)
- The World, such as it is, symphonic picture (1997)
- Concerto for oboe and orchestra (1988). First performance – December 1991; Moscow
- Concerto for bassoon and orchestra (1996). First performance – October 1996; Stavanger (Norway)
- Concerto for flute and orchestra C'est la vie (2003). First performance – November 2003; Moscow
- Concerto for cello and orchestra (1998). First performance – November 2000; Moscow
- Castles in the air (2003) for 24 flutes. First performance – March 2005; Paris (France)
- Concerto for organ and orchestra Obélisque (2005). First performance – November 2006; Moscow

=== Chamber string orchestra with soloists ===
- DSCH-Meditation (1999) for organ and 20 strings
- Con moto morto (2000) fantasy for 4 buckets, 12 strings, organ and small mechanical monkey. First performance – November 2006; Rostov-on-Don (Russia)
- Le cauchemar nocturne de l'agent Fix (2005), musical joke for chamber string orchestra based on Jules Verne's novel Le tour du monde en quatre-vingts jours. First performance – June 2005; Paris

=== Ensembles of soloists ===
- Diffusion for three ensembles and off-stage tuba (1988). First performance – May 1989; Chelyabinsk
- Chamber symphony no. 1 Silencium (1989) for 14 performers. First performance – April 1990, Moscow
- Chamber symphony No. 2 Touching (1995) for 16 performers
- Chamber symphony No. 3 Light and Shade – Setting off (1999) for 7 performers. First performance – October 1999; Bakeu (Romania)
- Chamber symphony No. 4 Le monde disparaissant (2010) for 8 performers. First performance – May 2010, Paris (France)
- Chamber symphony No. 5 Five pictures of invisibility (2010) for 6 performers. First performance – June 2010, Feldkirch (Austria)
- Devil's Trills, variations on a theme of Tartini (1990) for 16 performers. First performance – December 1990; Moscow
- Over Eternal Peace (1992), chamber concerto for the bassoon and 14 performers. First performance – November 1992; Zurich (Switzerland)
- Seven Illusory Images of Memory (1995) for 16 performers. First performance – May 1995; Frankfurt am Main (Germany)
- Beyond the Time, variation on a theme of Denisov (1998) for 14 performers. First performance – May 1998; Bielefeld (Germany)
- Twelve Samples of Interrelations between bassoon, eight double-basses and eight kettle-drums (1996). First performance – November 1996; Moscow
- Les Symboles de Picasso (2003), five miniatures for 12 performers. First performance – June 2004; Paris
- Contro lamento (2004) for 16 performers. First performance – November 2004; Moscow
- Hommage à Honegger (2005) for 9 performers. First performance – September 2005; Warsaw

=== Vocal ===
- Nevermore (1992), mono-opera for baritone and 17 performers based on Edgar Allan Poe's poem The Raven. First (concert) performance – November 1995; Moscow. Soloist – V. Savenko. First staged – June 2006; Moscow
- Stabat Mater (1991) for soprano and string quartet. First performance – July 1992; Kulundborg (Denmark)
- Ave Maria (1989) for 12 voices, violin, organs and vibraphone. First performance – November 1991; Moscow
- A Dream (1996) for soprano and organ (based on the poem by Edgar Allan Poe). First performance – July 1997; Loccum (Germany)
- Effet de Nuit (1996) for bass-baritone, clarinet, horn, piano, vibraphone and cello (based on the poem by Paul Verlaine). First performance – September 1996; Saint-Pierre-des-Corps (France)
- Trois Fables de Jean de La Fontaine (1997) for bass-baritone, oboe, clarinet, trombone, percussion, violin, viola and cello. First performance – November 2002; Tours (France)
- "Magic violin" (2001) for mezzo-soprano and tape to [N]. [(Nased on the poem by Nikolai Gumilev). First performance – April 2001; Genoa (Italy)
- Promenade Sentimentale (2008) for two vocal ensembles on poem by Paul Verlaine. First performance – June 2009, Paris (France)

=== Quintets ===
- "Crossthoughts" (1998) for bassoon and cello quartet. First performance – June 1998; Avignon (France)

=== Quartets ===
- Landscape Fading into Infinity (1991) for clarinet, violin, cello and piano. First performance – September 1992; Frankfurt am Main (Germany)
- Invention (1989) for string quartet. First performance – October 1989; Leningrad
- Epitaph in Memory of Alban Berg (1988) for oboe, violin, harp and percussion. First performance – June 1988; Moscow
- Chorale (1997) for 4 double basses
- Ghost of Music (2002) for clarinet, bassoon, organ and percussion. First performance – September 2002; Moscow
- Woman in White (2007) for string quartet and two short phonograms. First performance – November 2007, Moscow
- Monody (2008) for cello quartet. First performance – November 2008, Moscow

=== Trio ===
- Goat Song (1991) for bassoon, double-bass and percussion. First performance – May 1994; Valencia (Spain)
- Game of Gale (1995) for tenor-saxophone, marimba and piano
- Sketch of a picture with collage (1990) for violin, trumpet and piano. First performance – June 1992; Korshom (Finland)
- Schoenberg's Space (1993) for violin, cello piano. First performance – November 1993; Hamburg (Germany)
- Nocturne (1991) for clarinet, violin and piano. First performance – September 1991; Cologne (Germany)
- Scrappy Reflections(1997) for cello, piano and percussion. First performance – November 1997; Moscow

=== Duets ===
- Variations (1990) for clarinet and piano. First performance – July 1992; Chester (England)
- Chaconne (1992) for bassoon, cello and live-electronics. First performance – February 1993; Paris (France)
- Briefly about a serious matter (1994) for trombone and organ. First performance – September 1994; Moscow
- Gas-Bag (1997) for soprano-saxophone and alto-saxophone. First performance – March 1999; Rouen (France)
- Concertando con forza tanta (1999) for cello and piano. First performance – October 1999; Lviv (Ukraine)
- Dialogue with commentaries (2005) for double bass and piano
- Untransparent Emptiness (2008) for flute and cello. First performance – November 2009, Moscow
- Prelude, Toccata and Fugue (2008) for two pianos. First performance – September 2008, Moscow
- Ballad (2009) for bassoon and piano. First performance – July 2009, Birmingham (UK).
- Dramatic lullaby(2010) for piano and organ . First performance – February 2010; Paris

=== Solo ===
- Sonata-Infernale (1989) for solo bassoon. First performance – August 1992; Frankfurt am Main (Germany)
- Postludio (1990) for solo harp. First performance – April 1994; Gent (Belgium)
- Cantus firmus (1990) for solo violin. First performance – June 1990; Latina (Italy)
- Credo (1990) for solo organ. First performance – October 1992; Moscow
- Reminiscence (1993) for piano and recorded piano. First performance – May 1997; Boswil (Switzerland)
- La Bonne Humeur de Monsieur Degeyter (2000), musical joke for solo organ. First performance – September 2000; Roquevaire (France)
- La Leçon de la Démocratie (2002), musical joke for solo organ. First performance – October 2002; Paris
- Quintessence (2003) for solo piano. First performance – November 2003; Cagliari (Sardinia)
- Lontano (2005) documentary music for organ and tape. First performance – January 2006; Paris

=== Film music ===
- Yielded revolutions (1987), Flayer (1990), Killer (1990), Backcountry (1991), Strange side (1991), It its will obtain (1992), Your fingers smell of incense (1993), I am eternally to return (1993) and others

=== Music for animated films ===
- Conqueror (1997), Nut cracker (2003) and others

== Discography ==
- "Devil's Trills", variations on Tartini's theme: Moscow contemporary music ensemble (Mezhdunarodnaya Kniga, 1991, MK 417036)
- "Nocturne" for clarinet, violin and piano: Moscow contemporary music ensemble (Olympia, 1991, OCD 282)
- "Epitaph in Memory of Alban Berg" for oboe, harp, violin and percussion: Moscow contemporary music ensemble (Olympia, 1991, OCD 283)
- "Sonata infernale" for bassoon solo: Valeri Popov (Olympia, 1992, OCD 295)
- "Goat Song" for bassoon, double-bass and percussion: Moscow contemporary music ensemble (Olympia, 1993, OCD 297)
- "Over Eternal Peace", chamber concerto for bassoon and 14 performers: Valeri Popov, Moscow contemporary music ensemble (Zvuk agency, 1998, ZV 80–98146)
- "La Bonne Humeur de Monsieur Degeyter, musical joke for organ solo: Hervé Désarbre (Mandala and Harmonia Mundi, 2001, MAN 4896)

=== Five profile CDs ===
- «Landscape fading into infinity» for clarinet, violin, cello and piano, «Nevermore!», overture to the opera-monodrama for 16 performers, «Credo» for organ solo, «Cantus firmus» for violin solo, «Variations» for clarinet and piano, «Postlude» for harp solo, «Silencium», chamber symphony No 1 for 14 performers: Moscow contemporary music ensemble (Le Chant du Monde and Harmonia Mundi, 1992, LDC 288,060 CM 210)
- «Lincos», sequence for symphony orchestra, «Ave Maria» for 12 voices, violin, organ and vibraphone, «Genesis», micro-symphony for symphony orchestra, «Stabat mater» for soprano and string quartet, Concerto for oboe and symphony orchestra, «Invention» for string quartet: State USSR Symphony Orchestra of Cinematography, New Moscow choir, Moscow contemporary music ensemble (Olympia, 1992, OCD 296)
- «Devil's Trills», variations on Tartini's theme, «A Dream» for soprano and organ on poem by Edgar Allan Poe, «Light and Shade – Setting off», chamber symphony No 3 for 7 performers, «12 Samples of Interrelations between bassoon, 8 double-basses and 8 kettle-drums», «Reminiscence» for piano and "piano", «Seven Illusory Images of Memory» for 16 performers: Moscow contemporary music ensemble (Le Chant du Monde and Harmonia Mundi, 2000, LDC 2781120 HM 57)
- «Nutcracker», variations and paraphrases on the themes by P. I. Tchaikovsky: State Russian Symphony Orchestra of Cinematography (Le Chant du Monde and Harmonia Mundi, 2005, LDC 2781146 HM 57)
- «Sonata – Infernale» for bassoon solo, «Goat Song» for bassoon, double-bass and percussion «Chaconne» for bassoon, cello and live-electronics: Valeri Popov, Moscow contemporary music ensemble (Vista Vera, 2009, WCD-00200)
