= Bassoon Concerto (Jolivet) =

Concerto by André Jolivet

French composer André Jolivet wrote his Concerto for Bassoon, String Orchestra, Harp and Piano in 1953–54. It was premièred on 30 November 1954 by Maurice Allard and the Orchestre Radio-Symphonique, Paris.

It lasts about 13 minutes and is considered one of the most difficult concertos in the bassoon's repertoire.

== Overview ==
The concerto is in two movements, each featuring a slow and a fast section.

1. A. Recitativo
  B. Allegro gioviale
2. A. Largo cantabile
  B. Fugato

Echoing the Baroque slow–fast–slow–fast sonata da chiesa, it also displays influence from neo-classicism and jazz.

The opening recitativo displays the large range of the bassoon in a sparsely accompanied tirade by the soloist, beginning with quiet, tense and angular statements in the high range, but becoming more and more agitated, frenetic and declamatory, often running up and down the instrument vigorously. Frequent pauses in the bassoon's monologue and dry, harsh punctuation add to the effect of "recitativo", and the final and most vehement statement morphs over a protracted trill and flippant F major resolution into the second half of the movement, Allegro gioviale, which features syncopated rhythms throughout. The orchestra plays a jazz-like chromatic theme and builds darkly towards the bassoon's entry, which in turn plays an acrobatic, ironically jocular theme, rejecting the first one heard in the orchestra. This manic and facetious character persists throughout the movement; the bassoon eventually reprising the expository theme before "breaking character" and distorting it greatly with jarring, angstful interjections (foreshadowing the next movement) and then performing a series of ascending scales, thematically inverting the descending string scales in the exposition, and runs up to a top F before the movement tumbles to a close.

The Largo cantabile has been described as haunting, lyrical and colourful with some fine contributions of the solo violin and the harp. The mood is humid, dejected, and desolate, with the bassoon's vocal top-octave lines creating a strained-voice effect of crying or wailing. The orchestra fades out, and the bassoon, alone, grimly proceeds into the last section.

The fugato, the final section, belies its relatively austere title and includes some "enchanting" effects. The plaintive mood from the prior section of the movement focuses and becomes sinister, and a tenebrous interplay of soloist and orchestra ensues, taking on characteristics of a danse macabre. The fugato structure is exploited to create dialogue between the soloist and orchestra, especially between bassoon and solo violin; the sentiments of the solo line and orchestra are in much greater accord here than in the Allegro Gioviale. The movement gains speed and power towards the finale, but at the end moves forcefully and unexpectedly into D major, the bassoon howling a final high D at the close.

Although a fairly short concerto, it calls for masterful levels of technique and control, and great variety and depth of character. It is one of the most difficult concerti in the bassoon's repertoire, and has been called a "delight for virtuosos".

== Discography ==
- Maurice Allard (bassoon), Orchestre Jean-François Paillard, Conductor: André Jolivet, Recorded in 1969, Warner – Erato 2564 61320-2 (2004).
- Valeri Popov (bassoon), Moscow Symphony Orchestra, Conductor: Gennady Rozhdestvensky, Recorded in 1976, Melodiya 1002215 (2014).
- Dag Jensen (bassoon), Cologne Radio Symphony Orchestra, Conductor: Werner Andreas Albert, Capriccio 10-579 (1997).
- Sergio Azzolini (bassoon), Kammerakademie Potsdam, Conductor: Maurice Bourgue, Capriccio 67-139 (2005).
- Robert Rønnes (bassoon), Stavanger Symphony Orchestra, Conductor: Jonathan Stockhammer, (2006).
- Rie Koyama (bassoon), Südwestdeutsches Kammerorchester Pforzheim, Conductor: Sebastian Tewinkel, Genuin Musikproduction 13288 (2013).
- Rodion Tolmachev (bassoon), Mariinsky Theatre Orchestra, Conductor: Ivan Stolbov, Recorded in 2013, Melodiya 1002413 (2015).
