= Müller & Schade =

Swiss music publisher

Müller & Schade is a Swiss music publisher founded in 1850 and based in Bern.

== History ==
Müller & Schade was founded in Bern in 1850 and is organised in the legal form of a public limited company. The Musiknotenhaus publishes choral and yodel music as well as Neue Musik compositions. More than 2000 works by 100 authors are edited. CDs are also published.

Among the sound creators are Dora Cojocaru, Klaus Cornell, Thomas Demenga, Antal Doráti, Thomas Fortmann, Hans Eugen Frischknecht, Arthur Furer, Paul Glass, Daniel Glaus, Jürg Hanselmann, Michael Heisch, Christian Henking, Albert Moeschinger, Alfred Schweizer, Robert Suter, Dimitri Terzakis and others.
