= Music of Liechtenstein =

Arms of Liechtenstein

The music of Liechtenstein has produced an internationally renowned composer in Josef Rheinberger (1839–1901), who was mentor to Engelbert Humperdinck and a friend of Franz Liszt.

The national anthem of Liechtenstein is "Oben am jungen Rhein", which was written in 1850 by Jakob Josef Jauch to the tune of "God Save the King", the national anthem of the United Kingdom.

One of the most notable singers from Liechtenstein is Al Walser. Other notable acts that have had success outside Liechtenstein are Erben der Schöpfung and Elis. Another band from Liechtenstein is WeltenBrand.

== Music institutions ==
A popular tourist site, Liechtenstein hosts a number of music festivals, including the Guitar Days, held annually. The rock and metal music festival Wavejam Openair is held annually in Balzers. Musical organizations include the Liechtenstein Musical Company. Radio Liechtenstein was the biggest radio station in the country, until it was shut down. There are more than 400 music associations in Liechtenstein, including the Liechtenstein Musical Company and the International Josef Gabriel Rheinberger Society.

=== Music education ===
The Liechtenstein Music School (German: Liechtensteinische Musikschule) is the most important music education institution in the country. It was opened in 1963 and became a Stiftung in 1973. Since 1968, it has been headquartered in Vaduz, in the home where Josef Rheinberger was born in 1839. The Liechtenstein Music School also cooperates with public schools in providing music education for younger students.

== See also ==
- Jürg Hanselmann, Swiss-Liechtensteiner pianist, composer and music educator
- Marco Schädler, Liechtensteiner composer
