= Spires Intercollegiate Arts & Literary Magazine =

Intercollegiate arts and literary magazine

- Categories: Literary magazine
- Frequency: Biannual
- Format: Print and digital
- Publisher: Washington University in St. Louis
- Founded: 1994
- Country: United States
- Based in: St. Louis, Missouri
- Language: English
- Website: https://sites.wustl.edu/spires/

Spires Intercollegiate Arts & Literary Magazine, commonly known as Spires, is an intercollegiate arts and literary magazine based in Washington University in St. Louis.

== Overview ==
Spires is published biannually. The magazine features poetry, prose, short fiction, creative nonfiction, drama, visual art, and digital media created by undergraduate contributors across the United States. Submissions are reviewed by a student editorial staff.

== History ==
Spires has been on campus since 1994.

=== Financial struggles ===
In 2009, the magazine received significantly reduced Student Union funding, requiring them to fundraise to continue print publication. In 2013, the editorial staff appealed for additional funding for printing costs. Despite the digital edition, staff members indicated that a transition to a digital-only format was not seriously considered at the time.

In 2015, Student Life reported on the proposed launch of an additional literary magazine at Washington University. The article identified concerns of a competing magazine dividing an already small campus community.

== Campus programming ==
In 2016, Spires co-sponsored a Trending Topics speaker event in collaboration with the Washington University Student Union. The event featured St. Louis Poet Laureate Michael Castro and was intended to coincide with the release of the magazine's fall issue. The event was postponed due to Castro's hospitalization.

== Online presence ==
In addition to print publication, Spires maintains a digital archive of current and past issues.
