= Alfred Schweizer =

Swiss composer

Alfred Schweizer (born 4 November 1941) is a Swiss composer.

== Life ==
Schweizer was born in Sevelen. After obtaining his Matura in Solothurn, he studied musicology with Arnold Geering and Lucie Dikenmann-Balmer and languages at the University of Bern. From 1963 to 1966, he received practical musical training with Sándor Veress and Theo Hirsbrunner at the University of Bern. From 1967 to 1972, he studied composition with Klaus Huber at the City of Basel Music Academy and in 1986/87 further studies with Gerald Bennett, Bruno Spoerri and Rainer Boesch at the Swiss Centre for Computer Music in Oetwil am See.

In 1969, he became a teacher of theory at the Winterthur Conservatory. Between 1970 and 2003, Schweizer taught composition and music theory at the Biel Conservatory. In 1981, he was the founder of the contemporary concert series "classic 2000" in Biel and in 1986 of the CD label of the same name. In 2002/03, he was one of the founding members of the Festival L'art pour l'Aar in Bern.

His works have been performed at home and abroad, including in Germany and Eastern Europe and have been published by Müller & Schade.
