= Attila József =

Hungarian poet (1905–1937)

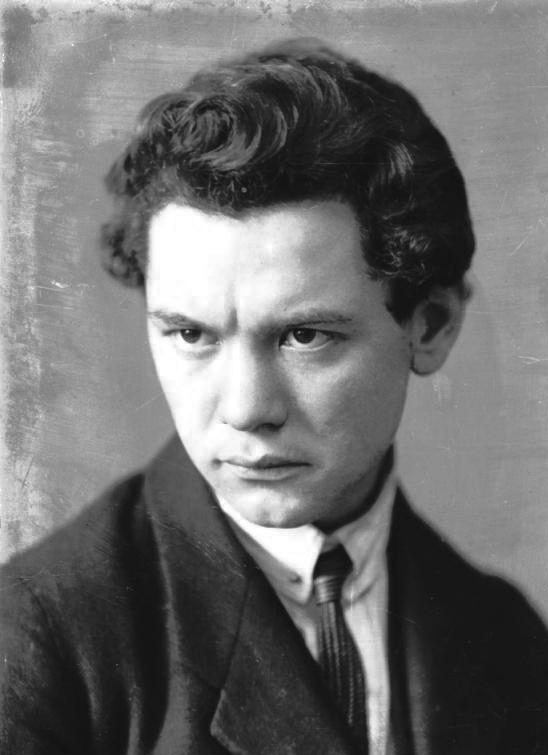
- József in 1924
- Born: József Attila; 11 April 1905; Ferencváros, Budapest, Austria-Hungary
- Died: 3 December 1937 (aged 32); Balatonszárszó, Kingdom of Hungary
- Resting place: Fiume Road Graveyard, Budapest, Hungary (Plot 35-2-59)
- Education: University of Szeged; Franz Joseph University
- Occupations: Poet, translator
- Partner: Szántó Judit (1930-1936) Flóra Kozmutza
- Relatives: Áron József (father); Borbála Pőcze (mother)
- Writing career
- Language: Hungarian
- Years active: 1918–1937
- Period: 1922–1937
- Genres: Social poetry, love poetry, prose, translation
- Notable works: Szépség koldusa (1922); Nem én kiáltok (1924); Külvárosi éj (1932); Medvetánc (1934)
- Notable awards: Baumgarten Prize (1938, posthumous); Kossuth Prize (1948, posthumous); Hungarian Heritage Award (2001, posthumous)
- Movements: influences: Gyula Juhász; Gyula Illyés; Dezső Kosztolányi; Mihály Babits; Endre Ady; Lajos Kassák; Lőrinc Szabó; influenced: László Nagy; János Pilinszky; György Petri; László Papp; József Szervác; Ede Zsigmond

Attila József (Note: Hungarian pronunciation: [ˈɒtillɒ ˈjoːʒɛf]) (11 April 1905 – 3 December 1937) was one of the most famous Hungarian poets of the 20th century. Generally not recognized during his lifetime, József was hailed during the communist era of the 1950s as Hungary's great "proletarian poet" and he has become the best known of the modern Hungarian poets internationally.

== Biography ==
Well, in the end I have found my home,
the land where flawless chiselled letters
guard my name above the grave
where I'm buried, if I have buriers.

— Ime, hát megleltem hazámat (first stanza), translated by Edwin Morgan, Attila József

Attila József was born in Ferencváros, a poor district of Budapest, in 1905 to Áron József, a soap factory worker of Székely and Romanian origin from Banat, and Borbála Pőcze, a Hungarian peasant girl with Cuman ancestry; he had two elder sisters, Eta and Jolán. When Attila was three years old, he was sent to live with foster parents after his father abandoned the family and his mother became ill. At the time of his birth, Attila was not a well known name; because of this, his foster parents called him Pista, a nickname for the Hungarian version of Stephen.

From ages seven to fourteen, Attila returned to living with his mother until she died of cancer in 1919, aged only 43. While also attending school, he worked many odd jobs and was a self-described street urchin. After the death of his mother, the teenage Attila was looked after by his brother-in-law, Ödön Makai, who was relatively wealthy and could pay for his education in a good secondary school.

In 1924, Attila entered Franz Joseph University to study Hungarian and French literature, with the intention of becoming a secondary school teacher. He was expelled from the university, deemed unfit to be a teacher, after he wrote the provocative and revolutionary poem, Tiszta szívvel ("With a pure heart" or "With all my heart"). With his manuscripts, he traveled to Vienna in 1925 where he made a living by selling newspapers and cleaning dormitories, and then to Paris for the following two years, where he studied at the Sorbonne. During this period he read Hegel and Karl Marx, whose call for revolution appealed to him as well as the work of François Villon, the famous poet and thief from the 15th century. Financially, József was supported by the little money he earned by publishing his poems as well as by his patron, Lajos Hatvany. He returned to Hungary and studied at Pest University for a year. József then worked for the Foreign Trade Institute as a French correspondent and, later, was the editor of the literary journal Szép Szó (Beautiful Word.)

A supporter of the working class, Attila joined the illegal Communist Party of Hungary (KMP) in 1930. His 1931 work Döntsd a tőkét (Blow down the block/capital) was confiscated by the public prosecutor. József's later essay "Literature and Socialism" (Irodalom és szocializmus) led to indictment. In 1936, he was expelled from the Hungarian Communist Party due to his independence and interest in Freud.

Beginning in childhood, Attila began showing signs of mental illness and was treated by psychiatrists for depression and schizophrenia. In adulthood, he was sent by the state to a sanatorium and was diagnosed with "neurasthenia gravis." Modern scholars believe that he likely had borderline personality disorder. He never married and only had a small number of affairs, but frequently fell in love with the women who were treating him.

Attila József died on 3 December 1937, aged 32, in Balatonszárszó. At the time, he was staying at the house of his sister and brother-in-law. He was killed while crawling through railway tracks where he was crushed by a starting train. There is a memorial to him not far from the location where he died. The most widely accepted view is that he committed suicide, which he had previously attempted; he wrote five farewell letters that day.

== Poetry ==
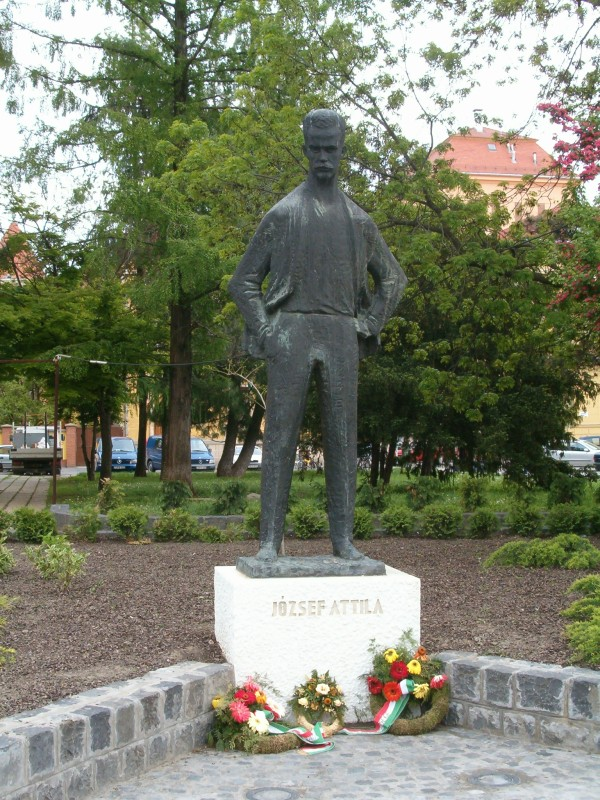
Statue of József near the University of Szeged

József published his first volume of poetry A szépség koldusa (Beauty's beggar) in 1922; at the time of publishing, he was seventeen and still in school.

In 1925, József published his second collection of poems, Nem én kiáltok (It's not me who shouts). József's works were praised by such internationally known Hungarian researchers and critics as Béla Balázs and György Lukács. In 1927, several French magazines published József's poems.

József's third collection of poems, Nincsen apám se anyám (1929) (I have neither father nor mother), showed the influence of French surrealism and Hungarian poets Endre Ady, Gyula Juhász and Lajos Kassák.

In the 1930s, József turned his focus from a search for beauty to the plight of the working class and reflected his interest in Communism. In 1932, Külvárosi éj (Night in the outskirts), a mature collection of poems, was published. His most famous love poem, Óda ("Ode"), from 1933, took the reader for a journey around and inside the body of the beloved woman.

József's last two books were Medvetánc (Bear dance) and Nagyon fáj (It hurts very much), published in 1934 and 1936 respectively. With these works he gained wide critical attention. Ideologically, he had started to advocate humane socialism and alliance with all democratic forces. It was Attila József who first formulated the ars poetica of transrealism in his 1937 poem Welcome to Thomas Mann. József's political essays were later included in Volume 3. of his Collected Works (1958).

=== Publications ===
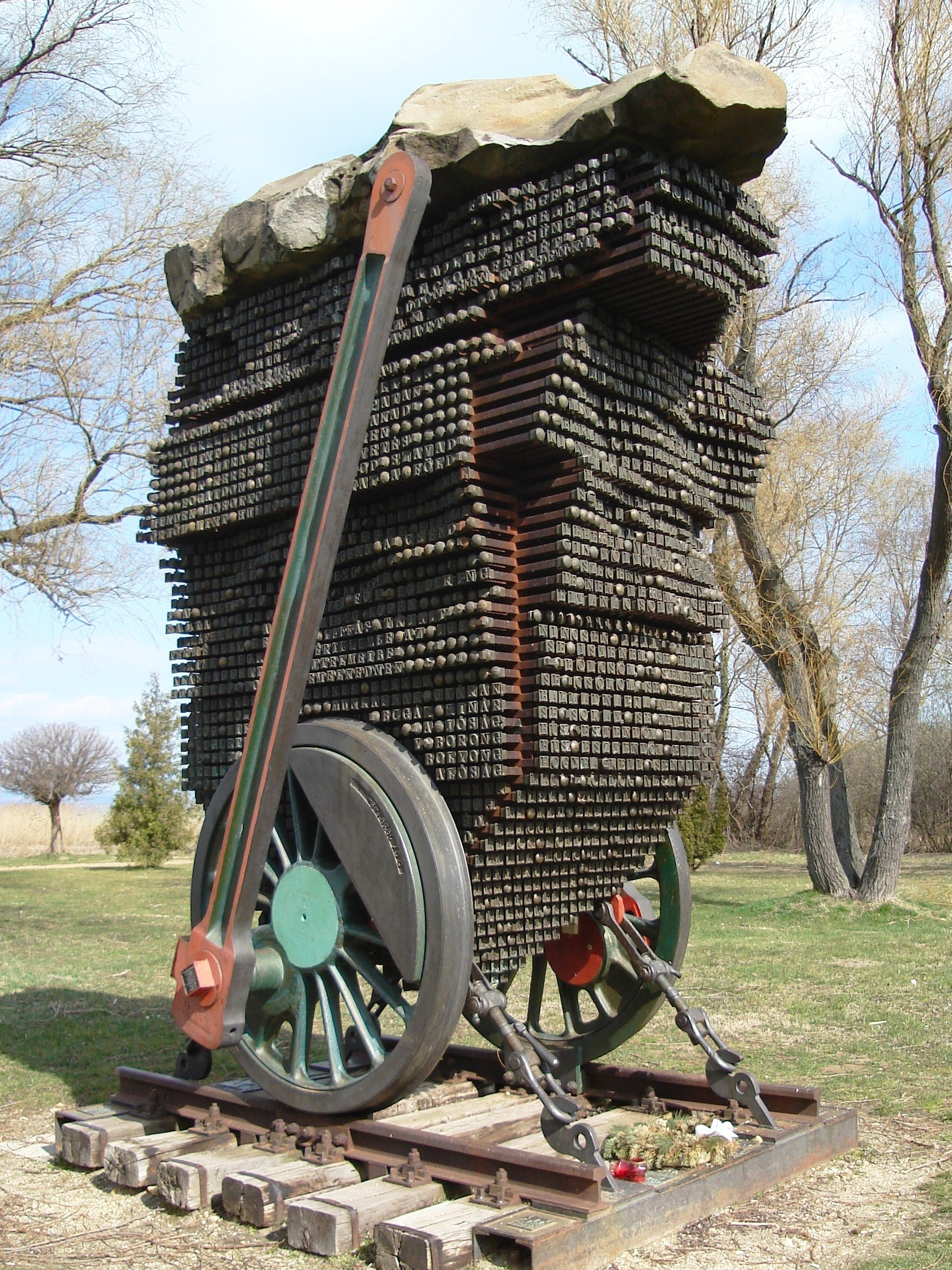
Memorial to Attila József in Balatonszárszó

==== Original works ====
- A szépség koldusa ("Beggar of Beauty"), 1922
- Nem én kiáltok ("That's Not Me Shouting"), 1925
- Nincsen apám se anyám ("Fatherless and Motherless"), 1929
- Döntsd a tőkét, ne siránkozz ("Chop at the Roots" or "Knock Down the Capital"), 1931
- Külvárosi éj ("Night in the outskirts"), 1932
- Medvetánc ("Bear Dance"), 1934
- Nagyon fáj ("It Hurts a Lot"), 1936

==== Published posthumously ====
- Collected verse and selected writings, 1938
- Collected verse and translations, 1940
- Collected works, 1958
- Collected works, 1967
- József Attila: Selected Poems and Texts, 1973 (introduction by G. Gömöri)

==== English translations ====
- Perched on Nothing’s Branch, 1987 (translated by Peter Hargitai)
- Winter Night: selected poems of Attila József, 1997 (translated by John Batki)
- The Iron-Blue Vault: selected poems, translated by Zsuzsanna Ozsvath and Frederick Turner, Bloodaxe Books, 2000 ISBN 1-85224-503-4
- Attila József: Sixty Poems, translated by Edwin Morgan, Edinburgh: Mariscat, 2001
- A Transparent Lion: selected poems of Attila József; translated by Michael Castro and Gabor G. Gyukics, Los Angeles, CA: Green Integer 149, 2006 ISBN 1-933382-50-3

Poems in English-language anthologies:

- The Lost Rider. Dávidházi, P. et al. (Budapest: Corvina Books, 1997)
- The Colonnade of Teeth: Modern Hungarian Poetry. Gömöri, G. and Szirtes, G. (Newcastle-upon-Tyne: Bloodaxe Books, 1996)
- In Quest of the Miracle Stag: The Poetry of Hungary. Edited by Ádám Makkai (Budapest: Atlantis-Centaur, 1996 and 2000)

== Tributes ==
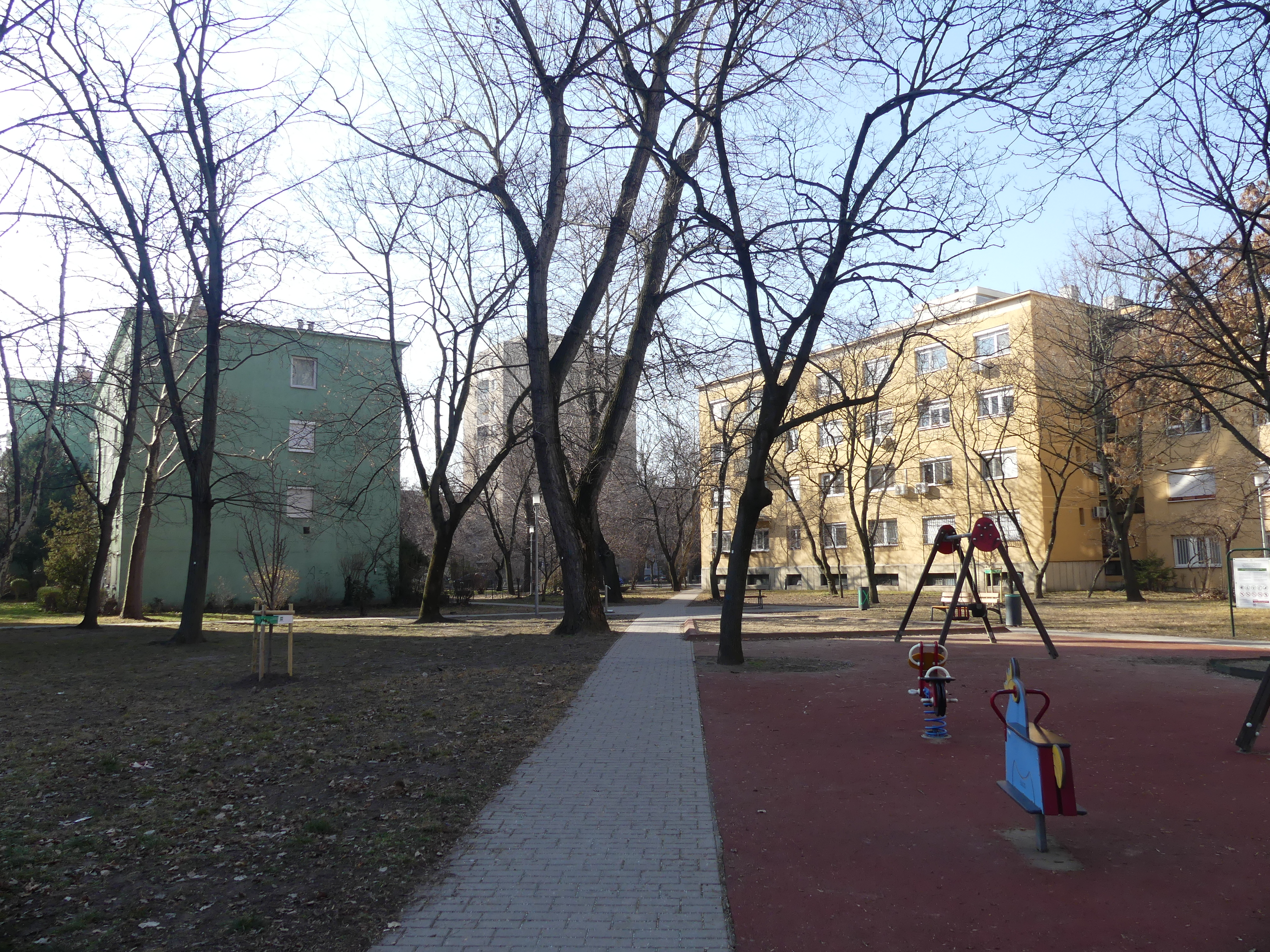
József Attila housing estate in Budapest

- Exhibition of paintings "Je ne crie pas"/"Nem kiáltok…!" ("I do not shriek") by Thibault Boutherin, a tribute to József's poem "Nem én kiáltok" ("No Shriek of Mine") and dedicated to SGG, in the Károlyi Foundation in Féhervárcsurgó (Hungary) August/November 2007.
- American band The Party recorded a country-folk version of Peter Hargitai's English translation of "Tiszta szívvel" ("With All My Heart") in 2004.
- Hungary issued postage stamps in his honor on 15 March 1947, 28 July 1955, 11 April 1980 and 11 April 2005.
