= Theo Hirsbrunner =

Swiss musicologist and violinist

Theodor Walter Hirsbrunner (2 April 1931 – 6 November 2010) was a Swiss musicologist and violinist.

== Life ==
Born in Thun, Hirsbrunner attended an old-language grammar school. He then studied violin with Walter Kägi in Bern and René Benedetti in Paris. From 1956 he studied musical composition and music theory (twelve-tone technique) with Sándor Veress and Wladimir Vogel. In the 1960s he attended a conducting course with Pierre Boulez in Basel.

From 1956 to 1987 he taught music theory, work analysis, and more recently, historical musicology at the Hochschule der Künste Bern. From 1968 to 1973 he conducted research at the Bibliothèque nationale de France. From 1979 to 1983 he taught at Boulez' request at the IRCAM. He gave lectures in Europe (e.g. at the Lucerne Festival), Australia (Adelaide 1979), Japan (Tokyo 1989), Taiwan (Taipei 1999) and the USA (Berkeley 1977 and Los Angeles 1987) as well as on representatives of Neue Musik at European radio stations (BR, WDR, RSR, RIAS, NDR, SFB and DRS). In addition to numerous articles for specialist journals, encyclopaedias and newspapers, he wrote five monographs on musical personalities (Debussy, Stravinsky, Boulez, Messiaen and Ravel) and two volumes on the history of music.

He has received several awards, including the Chevalier des Arts et des Lettres.

Hirsbrunner died in Bern at the age of 79.

== Students ==
- Jean-Luc Darbellay
- Hans Eugen Frischknecht
- Daniel Glaus
- Christian Henking
- Alfred Schweizer
- Robert Suter
- Jacques Wildberger

== Awards ==
- 1978: Janáček-Medaille der Tschechoslowakei
- 1984: Medaille of the UNESCO
- 1989: Medaille of the Nissay-Theaters Tokio
- 1996: Ehrendoktorwürde of the University of Bern
- 1998: Chevalier des Arts et des Lettres
- 2006: Grosser Musikpreis des Kantons Bern

== Work ==
- Debussy und seine Zeit. Laaber-Verlag, Laaber 1981, ISBN 3-921518-61-X.
- Igor Strawinsky in Paris. Laaber-Verlag, Laaber 1982, ISBN 3-921518-62-8.
- Pierre Boulez und sein Werk. Laaber-Verlag, Laaber 1985, ISBN 3-89007-047-7.
- Olivier Messiaen. Leben und Werk. Laaber-Verlag, Laaber 1988; 2nd expended edition 1999, ISBN 3-89007-139-2.
- Maurice Ravel. Sein Leben, sein Werk. Laaber-Verlag, Laaber 1989, ISBN 3-89007-143-0, 2nd expended edition u.d. T. Maurice Ravel und sein Werk. Laaber-Verlag, Laaber 2014, ISBN 978-3-89007-253-1.
- Die Musik in Frankreich im 20. Jahrhundert. Laaber-Verlag, Laaber 1995, ISBN 3-89007-197-X.
- Von Richard Wagner bis Pierre Boulez. Essays. Müller-Speiser, Anif 1997, ISBN 3-85145-048-5.

== Literature ==
- Hirsbrunner, Theodor. In Brockhaus Riemann Musiklexikon. CD-Rom, Directmedia Publishing, Berlin 2004, ISBN 3-89853-438-3, p. 12805.
