= Pedini (surname) =

Pedini is an Italian surname. Notable people with the surname include:

- Carlo Pedini (born 1956), Italian classical composer
- Federico Pedini Amati (born 1976), Sammarinese politician
- Maria Lea Pedini-Angelini (born 1954), Sammarinese politician
- Mario Pedini (1918–2003), Italian politician
