= Cécile Haussernot =

French chess player (born 1998)

Cecile Haussernot
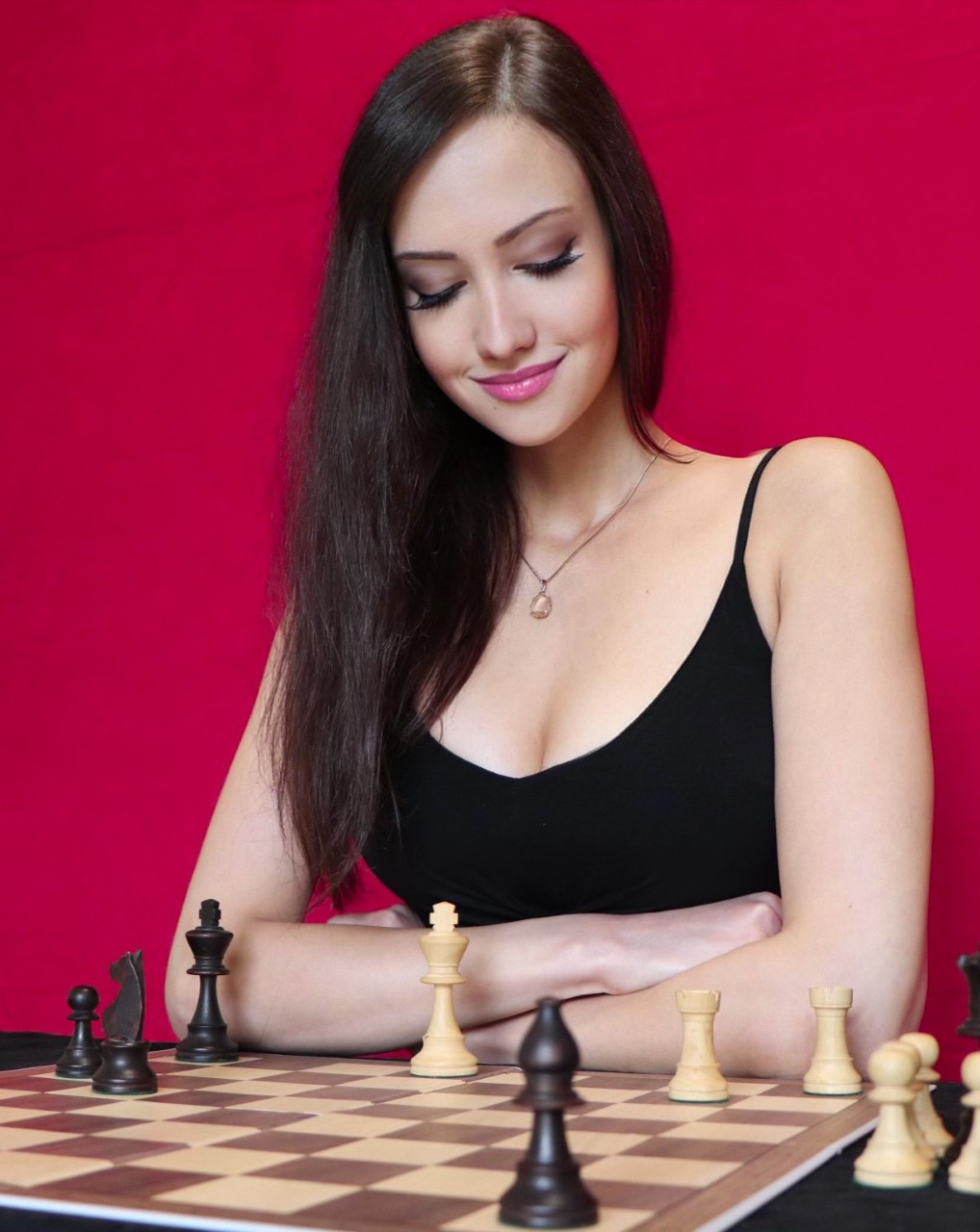
- Haussernot in 2020

Personal information
- Born: October 22, 1998 (age 27) Dijon, France
- Spouse: Giorgi Sibashvili (m. 2019)

Chess career
- Country: France
- Title: Woman International Master (2017)
- FIDE rating: 2287
- Peak rating: 2287 (September 2026)

Cécile Haussernot (born 22 October 1998) is a French chess player holding the title of Woman International Master (WIM). She was twice European champion in her age girls category.

== Career ==
Haussernot learned how to move the pieces at the age of five, and was invited to play on her club's team at the age of six and then learned the basics. She is a six-time French youth champion: U-8 Girls 2006, U-10 Girls 2007, U-14 Girls 2008, U-14 Girls 2011, U-16 Girls 2013 and U-20 2018. She became also French vice-champion in the U-16 Girls category in 2009 and finished 3rd in the U-12 Boys category at the 2010 French youth championships.

Haussernot won two gold medals at the European Youth Chess Championships, in the U-10 Girls section in 2007 at Šibenik, Croatia and in the U-12 Girls section in 2009 at Fermo, Italy. She took the bronze medal in the U-12 Girls category at Batumi, Georgia in 2010. In the World Youth Chess Championships, she finished fourth in the U-10 Girls section in 2008 in Vũng Tàu, Vietnam.

In August 2017, Haussernot finished second in the French women's championship. The next month, she played for the silver medal-winning French team in the Women's Mitropa Cup in Balatonszárszó, Hungary. In October, Haussernot finished fourth in the European ACP Women's Blitz Chess Championship in Monte Carlo, behind Alexandra Kosteniuk, Kateryna Lagno and Valentina Gunina respectively. She finished second in the French Woman's Rapid Championships in 2018 in Angoulême. The same year, she earned a Woman Grandmaster norm in Salento, Italy, in May 2018. She also earned a bronze medal in the French Women's Championships in August 2018 in Nîmes . She then represented France in the Olympiads in Batumi, in October 2018. In May 2019, she earned a second Woman Grandmaster norm in Brest, France, during the French Team Championships. In December 2020, she became French Woman Rapid Champion.

In May 2025, she finished in second place at the Salento Open in Italy. In July of the same year, she won the Chambéry Open. In June 2026, she won the bronze medal in the French Women's Rapid Championship in Agde, France. In August 2026, she finished runner-up at the 11th Menchik Memorial. In September 2026, she reached a peak FIDE rating of 2287.

== Youth major achievements ==
Year	Championship	Location	Category	Result	Reference
2006	French Youth Chess Championship	Aix-les-Bains, France	Girls U08	(gold) Winner	
2007	French Youth Chess Championship	Le Grand-Bornand, France	Girls U10	(gold) Winner	
2007	European Youth Chess Championship	Šibenik, Croatia	Girls U10	(gold) Winner	
2008	French Youth Chess Championship	La Roche-sur-Yon, France	Girls U14	(gold) Winner	
2009	European Youth Chess Championship	Fermo, Italy	Girls U12	(gold) Winner	
2011	French Youth Chess Championship	Montluçon, France	Girls U14	(gold) Winner	
2013	French Youth Chess Championship	Saint-Paul-Trois-Châteaux, France	Girls U16	(gold) Winner	
2018	French Youth Chess Championship	Agen, France	Girls U20	(gold) Winner	

== Other notable youth championship placements ==
Year	Championship	Location	Category	Placement	Reference
2008	World Youth Chess Championship	Vũng Tàu, Vietnam	Girls U10	4th place	
2009	French Youth Chess Championship	Aix les Bains, France	Girls U16	2nd place	
2010	French Youth Chess Championship	Troyes, France	Open U12	3rd place	
2010	European Youth Chess Championship	Batumi, Georgia	Girls U12	3rd place	
2011	European Youth Chess Championship	Albena, Bulgaria	Girls U14	5th place	
2012	European Youth Chess Championship	Prague, Czech Republic	Girls U14	5th place	
2014	French Youth Chess Championship	Montbéliard, France	Girls U16	2nd place	
2017	French Youth Chess Championship	Belfort, France	Girls U20	2nd place	

== Adult achievements ==
Year	Championship / Tournament	Location	Event / Category	Result	Reference
2017	French Women's Chess Championship	Agen, France	Women's Individual	(silver) Second place	
2017	Women's Mitropa Cup	Balatonszárszó, Hungary	National Team Event	(silver) Team Silver	
2017	European ACP Women's Blitz Championship	Monte Carlo, Monaco	Continental Individual	4th place	
2018	French Women's Rapid Chess Championship	Angoulême, France	Women's Individual	(silver) Second place	
2018	French Women's Chess Championship	Nîmes, France	Women's Individual	(bronze) Third place	
2020	French Women's Rapid Chess Championship	France (Online)	Women's Individual	(gold) Winner	
2025	14th Salento Open Master	Salento, Italy	Individual Open	(silver) Second place	
2025	31st Chambery Chess Festival	Chambery, France	Individual Open	(gold) Winner	
2025	French Women's Rapid Chess Championship	Saint-Tropez, France	Women's Individual	4th place	
2026	French Women's Rapid Chess Championship	Agde, France	Women's Individual	(bronze) Third place	
2026	Mind Sports Olympiad London Rapid	London, England	Open Rapid Field	(silver) 2nd Woman	
2026	Mind Sports Olympiad London Blitz	London, England	Open Blitz Field	(gold) 1st Woman	
2026	11th Menchik Memorial	London, England	Women's Closed Tournament	(silver) Second place	

== TV Show ==
In 2025, she participated in the second season of the television series Loups Garous, broadcast on Canal+, which is adapted from the board game Loups-Garous de Thiercelieux. She appeared in all ten episodes of the season and won the final prize alongside three other contestants.

== Private Life ==
From 2018 to 2022, Haussernot lived in Tbilisi, in Georgia, with her Georgian husband, Giorgi Sibashvili, who is also an International Master and professional chess player. In 2022, the couple relocated to Abu Dhabi, United Arab Emirates, where they have since resided.
