= Mass in A major, Op. 126 (Rheinberger) =

Mass in A major
- In Nativitate Domini
- by Josef Rheinberger
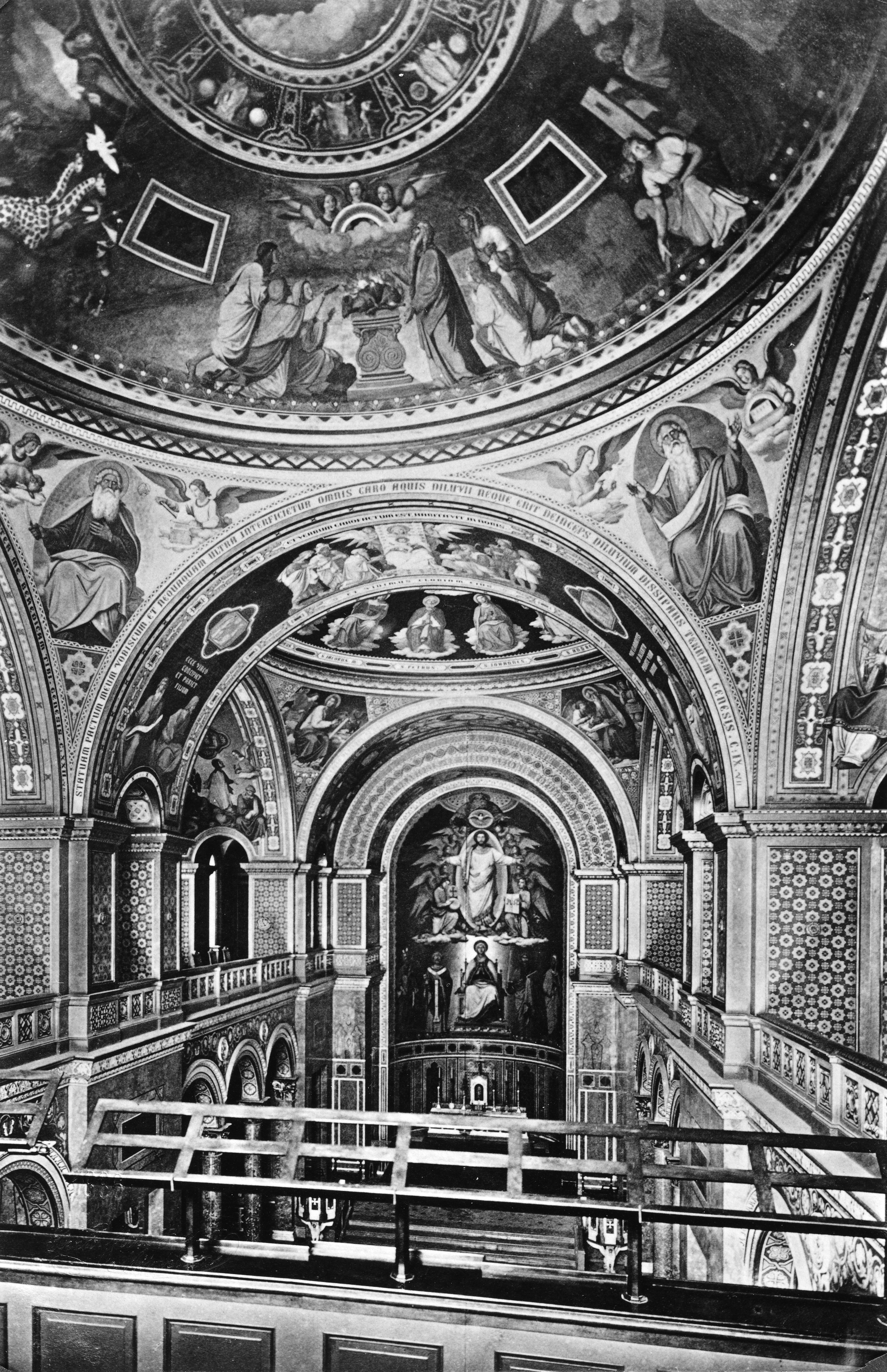
- Allerheiligen-Hofkirche in 1886
- Key: A major
- Opus: 126
- Language: Latin
- Composed: 1881
- Performed: 24 December 1881: Allerheiligen-Hofkirche. Munich
- Published: 1881
- Scoring: SSA choir; organ; optional: flute and string quintet, or orchestra

The Mass in A major, Op. 126, is a setting of the mass ordinary in Latin by Josef Rheinberger. He composed it in 1881, originally for a three-part choir (SSA) with organ. When he conducted the first performance at the Allerheiligen-Hofkirche in Munich on Christmas Eve, he added a flute and a string quintet. He wrote a version with orchestra later.

== History ==
Josef Rheinberger composed 14 masses, in addition to three Requiem masses and several youthful mass compositions. Most of these works were written during his tenure as Bavarian court composer in Munich, beginning in 1877, when liturgical music became his focus. All initial versions of these works use organ accompaniment. He wrote the Mass in A major, subtitled "Missa in Nativitate Domini" (Mass for the Birth of the Lord) within a few days in June 1881 for the Allerheiligen-Hofkirche of the Munich Residenz. It was published the same year. He conducted the first performance on Christmas Eve. While he composed the work originally for a three-part choir (SSA) with organ, he added a flute and a string quintet in the premiere, played by members of the Hofkapelle. The manuscript autograph is held by the Bayerische Staatsbibliothek München.

The mass was published by Carus-Verlag in 1994 as part of the complete edition of the composer's works.

== Structure and music ==
Rheinberger set the parts of the mass ordinary in five movements:

1. Kyrie
2. Gloria
3. Credo
4. Sanctus and Benedictus
5. Agnus Dei

The lines of the voices are singable (cantabile) throughout the composition and avoid extreme registers. They are often in homophony. The organ has a supporting function, without concertante elements. The main character of the music is lyrical and mellow. A reviewer described the mass as a "highly optimistic yet profoundly reverent score".

== Recordings ==
The mass was recorded in 2001, together with two other masses by Rheinberger, by the women's voices of the Renaissance Singers of Blackburn Cathedral, conducted by Richard Tanner, with organist Greg Morris.
