= Jürg Hanselmann =

Swiss composer

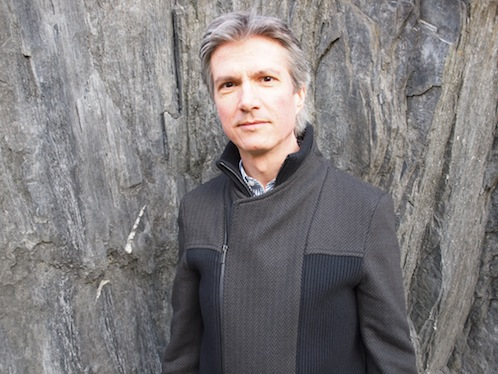
Jürg Hanselmann, 2013

Jürg Hanselmann (born 23 September 1960) is a Swiss-Liechtensteiner pianist, composer and music educator. He teaches piano and composition at the Sargans Cantonal School.

== Life ==
Born in Grabs, Hanselmann grew up in Schaan (Principality of Liechtenstein) and received his first piano lessons from Regina Enzenhofer at the Liechtenstein Music School in Vaduz. His first compositions date back to his early youth.

At the age of 17, he was a student of Albert Schneeberger and Kristina Steinegger at the Bern Conservatory, today's University of Music and Performing Arts. There, he obtained the soloist diploma "with distinction". His further education led him to London to the Hungarian pianist Louis Kentner and to Frankfurt to the Russian pianist Irina Lein-Edelstein.

From 1983, he completed a three-year course in composition and analysis in Berne with Sándor Veress, who was a student of Zoltán Kodály and had studied piano with Béla Bartók. He also attended master classes with Mieczysław Horszowski and the Beaux Arts Trio.

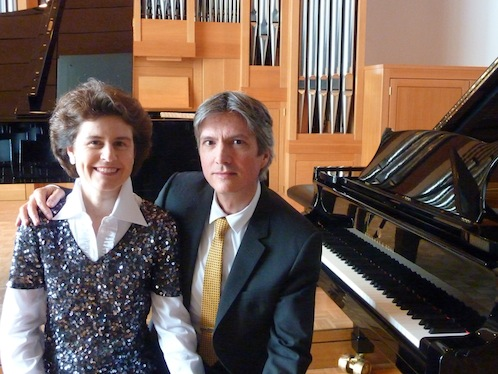
Sandra & Jürg Hanselmann, 2013

His pianistic concert activities have taken Hanselmann to Switzerland, Austria, Germany, France, Luxembourg, Holland, Italy and several times to the USA. In his concert activities, duo performances with his wife Sandra Hanselmann took place. The Duo Hanselmann deals with literature for piano duo. CD recordings with piano duo works by Johannes Brahms and Josef Gabriel Rheinberger have been released on the Prezioso label. Further works for two pianos have been published by Carus-Verlag and the Bernese publishing house Müller & Schade.

As a Lied accompanist, Hanselmann cultivates his collaboration with the Austrian tenor Karl Jerolitsch, with whom he has released a recording of his Hesse Liederkreis with the Bernese music publisher Müller & Schade Hanselmann performed chamber music concerts in trio with Claudio Veress and David Inniger. Among others, works by Sándor Veress were performed several times.

His love of music and painting also unites him in the Segantini Trio with the cellist Katharina Weissenbacher and the clarinettist Franco Mettler. For the foundation of the trio in 2017, Hanselmann composed his second clarinet trio "Triptych".

Hanselmann's compositional oeuvre is also published by Müller & Schade in Bern. In 2012, Hanselmann was awarded first prize in the composition competition of the Deutsche Oper Berlin within the chamber music series "Klang der Welt" for his work Ricercar for wind quintet.

Among the CD recordings of Hanselmann and the Duo Hanselmann are a complete recording of the piano works of Josef Rheinberger on 11 CDs (Carus Verlag), as well as 2 CDs with piano works by Nikolai Medtner (1993 and 1998), 1 CD with works for 2 pianos by Johannes Brahms. A collection of piano pieces on the theme "The railway in piano music" contains, among others, Rossini's Un petit train de plaisir and Honegger's piano arrangement of his orchestral piece Pacific 231, a first recording in this piano version.

Since March 2015 Hanselmann has been President of the International Josef Gabriel Rheinberger Society IRG, based in Vaduz.

== Awards and prizes ==
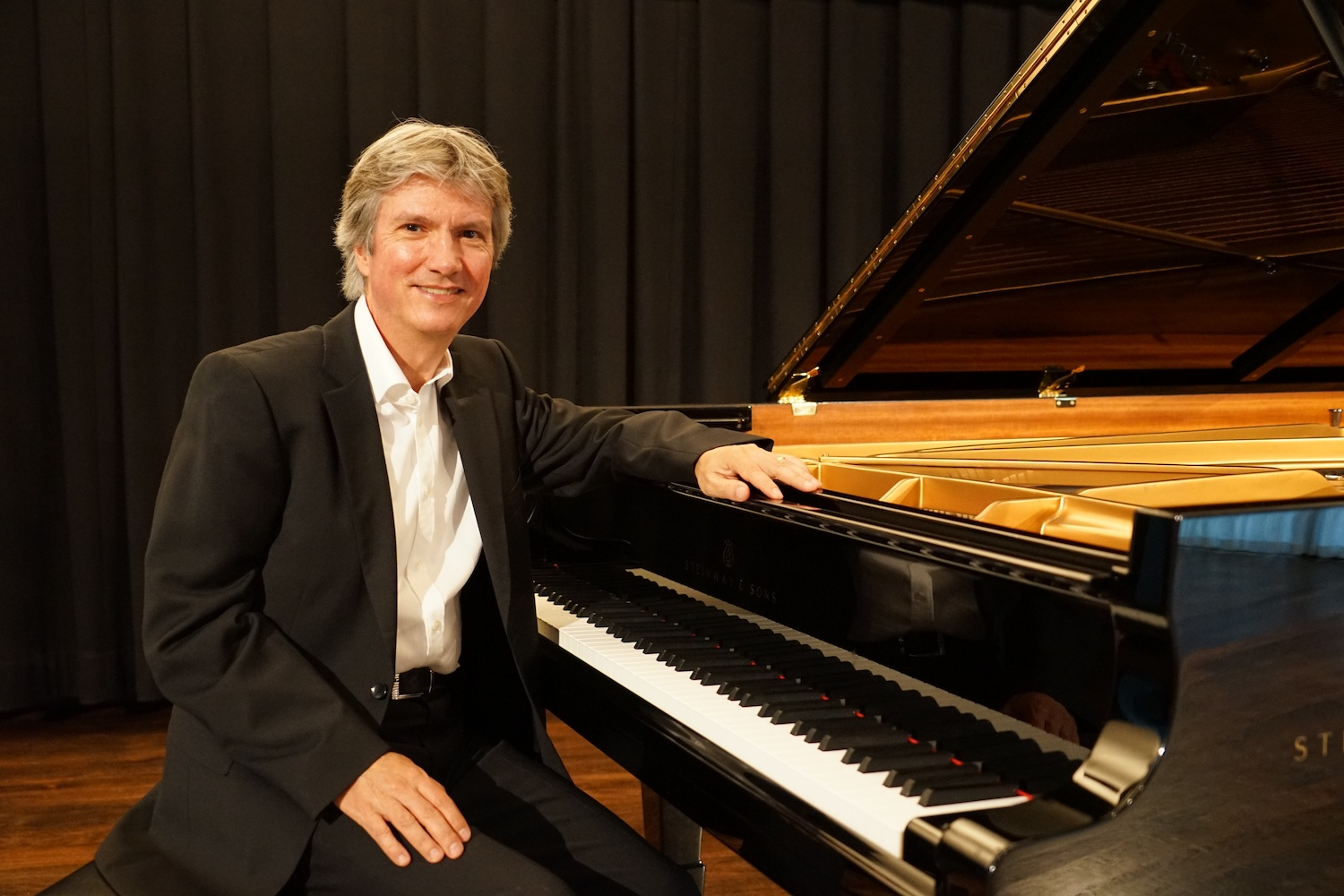
Jürg Hanselmann, 2017

- 1980: Eduard Tschumi Prize, Bern
- 1980: Prize of the Jubilee Foundation of the Swiss Volksbank, Berne
- 1983: Migros Competition, Zurich
- 1987: Rotary Prize, Liechtenstein
- 1991: Culture Prize of the International Lake Constance Conference, Munich
- 2005: Josef Gabriel von Rheinberger Prize, Vaduz
- 2012: 1st prize in the composition competition "Klang der Welt" of the Deutsche Oper Berlin

== Compositions ==
=== Instrumental music ===
Piano music solo

- Lyrical pieces, 1976/1979
- Four piano pieces, 1983
- Lyrical pieces, 2001
- Passacaglia (Homage to Rheinberger), 2003
- Three pieces of railway, 2004
- Railway Sonatina, 2005
- 1st sonata, 2005/2006
- Night play, 2006
- Toccata American, 2006
- Wind Chimes, 2007
- Three concert etudes, 2007
- Abendstern - Four pieces for piano, 2011
- Youth album, 2011
- Two album pages for Rebecca, 2011
- Passacaglia, 2013
- 8 epigrams in canonical form, 2013
- Four nocturnes for piano, 2014
- A little musical nonsense (Sonatina Buffa) for piano, 2015
- Autumn Sonata for piano, 2015
- 6 Préludes for piano, 2016
- 11 mood pictures in canonical form for piano, 2016
- 2nd sonata for piano, 2016
- 4 concert etudes for piano, 2016
- 4 Elegiac Pieces for piano, 2017
- Segantini studies for piano, 2018
- November, seven mood pictures for piano, 2018
- Scenes of children, 2019
- January, 8 mood pictures for piano, 2019
- Two Ophelia Fantasias for piano, 2019
- Hymnus 2007, arrangement for piano

Piano music for several players

- Elements, 1993/1994
- Youth album for piano for one, two, three & four hands, 1996
- Tabulatura (old dances and tunes) for 2 pianos and percussion, 2005
- Tabulatura (old dances and tunes), version for 2 pianos, 2005
- Sonata for two pianos, 2008
- SALtarello, 2010, arranged as concert version for two pianos
- Paradise Lost, 2010, arranged as concert version for 2 pianos
- Tarantella, 2010, arranged as concert version for 2 pianos
- Toccata for two pianos, 2013
- Notturno for two pianos, 2013
- Sonata for piano 4 hands, 2015

Concertante pieces

- Dies Irae, Variations for two pianos and orchestra, 2005
- Concert for the left hand, for piano and orchestra, 2008
- Concert for two pianos and orchestra, 2016

Orchestral pieces

- Sinfonietta for orchestra, 2007
- Hymn for orchestra, 2007
- Hymnus for string orchestra (short version), 2007
- Hymn for harp and strings (short version), 2009
- Partita for chamber orchestra, 2009
- SALtarello, concert overture for large orchestra 2009
- Paradise Lost for orchestra, 2010
- Tarantella for orchestra, 2010
- "Euridice" - Notturno for orchestra, 2011
- Ikarus for string orchestra, 2013, rev. 2018

Chamber music

- "Lamentationes" for viola and piano, 2007-2008
- Partita for string quintet, 2009
- Ricercare for wind quintet, 2011
- "Orfeo" - Notturno for piano and wind quintet, 2011
- Toccata for piano and wind quintet, 2014
- Trio for piano, violin and violoncello, 2014
- Trio for piano, clarinet and violoncello, 2015
- Autumn sonata for harp, 2015
- 3 Elegiac Vocalises for soprano, clarinet and piano, 2016
- Notturno for violin, violoncello and piano, 2016
- Sonata for clarinet in A and piano, 2016
- 2nd Trio for clarinet, violoncello and piano, "Triptych", 2017
- Sonata for violin and piano, 2018

=== Vocal music ===
Lieder with piano accompaniment

- Liederkreis nach Gedichten von Hermann Hesse für Gesang (Tenor) und Klavier, 2011
- Drei Lieder nach Gedichten von Sebastien Fanzun für Tenor und Klavier, 2012
- Matutinal, Liederzyklus nach Gedichten von Sebastien Fanzun für Tenor und Klavier, 2013
- An Mauern hin, Liederkreis nach Gedichten von Georg Trakl, 2016

Choir a cappella

- 2 Sacred Lieder for mixed choir, 2010

Cantata

- In Sand geschrieben, Cantata for soli, choir and orchestra after poems by Hermann Hesse, 2011

=== Rrevisions ===
- Musik der Renaissance, 2008 (23 Tänze und Weisen aus Orgeltabulaturbüchern, eingerichtet für den Unterricht für Klavier zu 4 Händen)
- Josef Gabriel Rheinberger: Singspiel Der arme Heinrich, op. 37 (Instrumentation)
- Josef Gabriel Rheinberger: Concert für Pianoforte Es-dur JWV 128 (Instrumentation)
