= Carlo Pedini =

Italian classical composer

Carlo Pedini (born 19 June 1956) is an Italian classical composer.

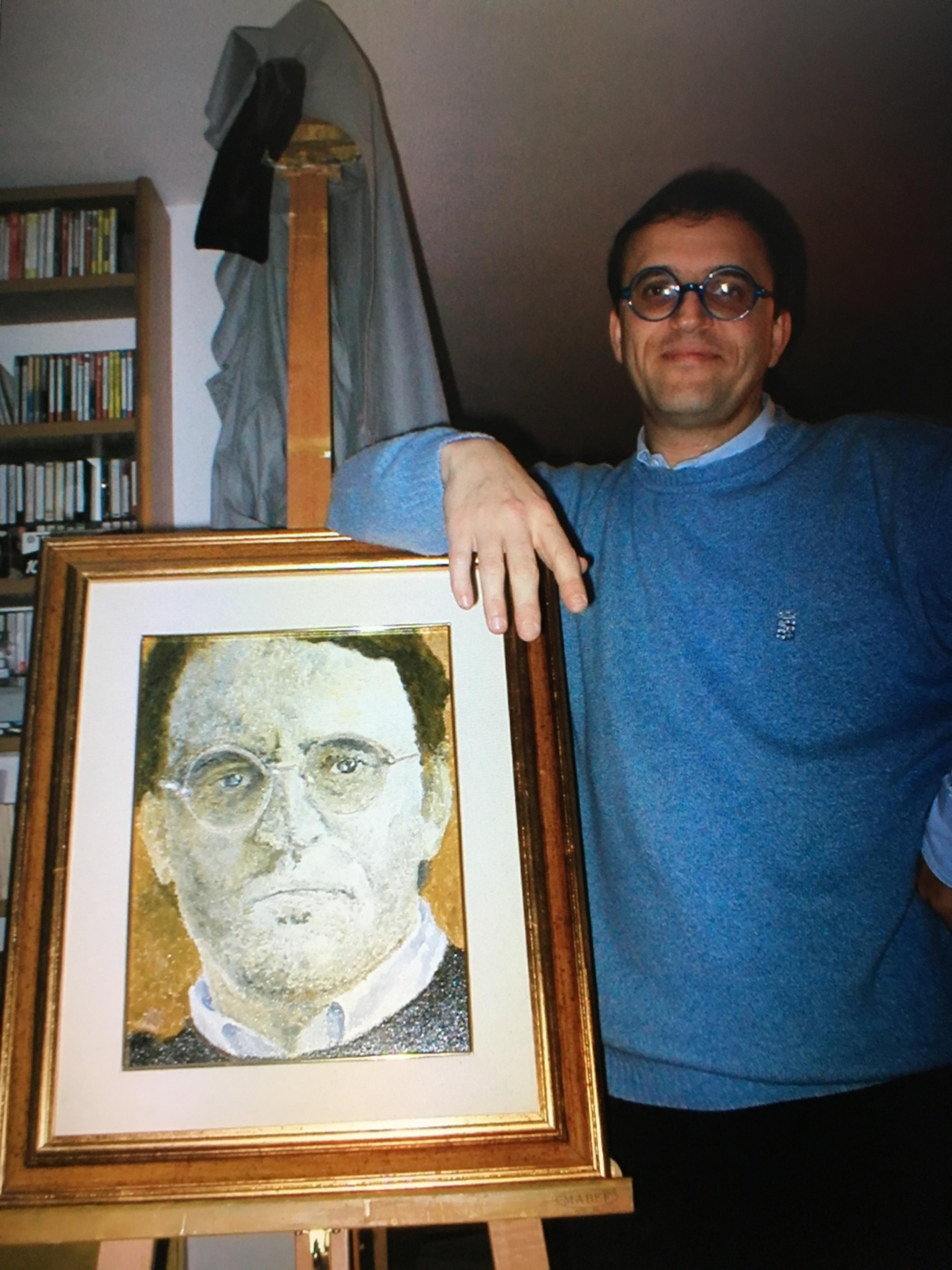
Carlo Pedini with self-portrait

== Life ==
Born in Perugia, Pedini taught himself music from the age of 13, before studying with Fernando Sulpizi at the Perugia Conservatory, Franco Donatoni in Siena and Salvatore Sciarrino in Città di Castello. He now teaches at the Perugia Conservatory, having previously taught in Avellino, Adria and Pesaro. Since 1980 Pedini has won prizes in numerous competitions. In 1995 his orchestral piece Il Cantico dei Cantici ("The Song of Solomon") won a prize at the "2 August" competition in Bologna. In September 1990 the RAI National Symphony Orchestra conducted by Vittorio Parisi took part in the 42nd Prix Italia in Palermo, playing Pedini's Predica agli Uccelli ("Sermon to the Birds") for soprano, piano, synthesised voice, tape and orchestra on a text by Lucio Lironi and Claudio Novelli. In 1993 the RAI commissioned his dramatic oratorio Il Mistero Jacopone (the story of Jacopone da Todi, the greatest Italian poet before Dante) for four voices, baritone, medieval instruments, chorus and orchestra, performed by the RAI National Symphony Orchestra conducted by Karl Martin, with the voice of Jacopone Mario Scaccia. In 2004 the Arena di Verona Foundation commissioned and performed the ballet L'anima del Perugino ("The Soul of Perugino"). In 2005 his "Requiem" for choir, organ and strings was performed at the Kusatsu Summer Festival in Japan. In 2007 his Magnificat (grande) for children's choir and instruments was performed at La Scala in Milan. From 1996–2003 Pedini was artistic director of Sagra Musicale Umbra, one of the oldest festivals in Europe. Works he commissioned or whose world premieres he organized include: Songs of Milarepa by Philip Glass (1997), Grido ("Shout") by Ennio Morricone (1998) and Concerto-cantata de Perugia by Leo Brouwer (1999). In 2004–2005 he was composer in residence for the Sagra Musicale Umbra festival. His compositions are performed and broadcast in Italy, France, Germany, Sweden, Greece, Russia, U.S.A, Japan and other countries. They are published by Casa Musicale Sonzogno, Milano. He is also known as a painter In 2016 he had the Premiere of "Agnus tropato" for three chorus in The United Kingdom with James Morgan Conductor and the BBC Singers From 2011 to 2016 he was president of the "Guido D'Arezzo" foundation. He also has activities in the field of fine arts.

== Music ==
Works for orchestra

- Concerto for violin and orchestra (1981)
- Il Cantico dei Cantici ("The Song of Solomon") (1986)
- La Casa di Asterione (1989)
- Euclide si diverte ("Euclid enjoys himself") (1991)
- Adagio (da uno studio per Jacopone) (1991) for strings
- Sinfonia (Reck-Symphony) (1993–1997)
  1. L'Addio ("The farewell")
  2. L'Attesa ("The wait")
  3. Il Ritorno ("The return")
- I colori del Perugino ("The Colours of Perugino") (1998) for flute, four clarinets and strings
- Canzoni usa e getta ("Disposable Songs") (1998)
- Canone di Pedini (1999) for strings
- Canzonetta (2000)
- Non svegliate Verdi ... ("Don't awaken Verdi") (2001)
- Concertino a volo D'Angelo (2005) for piano, choir ad lib. and strings
- Sei frammenti francescani (2006) for voice ad lib. and orchestra (texts drawn from The Life of St Francis (first and second) by Tommaso da Celano)
- La Follia (2009) for Strings
- Canova 2016 (2016) for Strings
- Le Stagioni non sono più le stesse (2017) for Violin and Strings
- H2O - Concerto per pianoforte e archi (2016) for piano and Strings

Works for soloists, choir and orchestra

- Torneremo a camminare (1985), cantata for choir, strings and cembalo, text by Aldo Capitini
- Il Mistero Jacopone (1989–1993) dramatic oratorio for four voices, baritone, medieval instruments, choir and orchestra, text by Claudio Novelli and Lucio Lironi
- In Te Domine speravi ("In Thee Lord I Put My Trust") (1994–1995) for choir (or 4 solo voices), organ and chamber orchestra
- Te Deum (1994–1999) for choir, children's voices, organ and orchestra
- Carme millenario (1999) for choir, wind orchestra and 5 percussionists
- Pater noster (2000) for tenor, choir and orchestra
- Victimae paschali laudes (2000) for tenor, choir and orchestra
- Requiem (2000–2003) for mixed choir, children's choir, organ and strings
- Missa Liturgica (2004) for choir and strings (or solo organ)

Lyric operas and ballets

- Rabarbaro, rabarbaro ("Rhubarb, rhubarb") (1982–83), opera in one act, text by Gino Viziano
- Orfeo in città ("Orpheus in Town") (1996), chamber opera in one act, text by Alberto Pellegrino
- Un giorno qualunque ("Some day or other") (1995–1998), opera in one act, text by Gino Viziano and Carlo Pedini
- Così fan (quasi) tutte ("That's what [almost] all women do") (2001–2002), chamber-opera in one act, text by Giacomo Pedini
- Il Pranzo ("The Lunch") (2002) ballet in one act for orchestra
- Il Miracolo ("The Miracle") (2004) chamber opera in one act, text by Giacomo Pedini
- L’anima del Perugino (2004), ballet scene for orchestra

Works for chorus (and organ or instruments)

- Super flumina Babylonis ("By the Rivers of Babylon") (1988) for five-part mixed choir
- Magnificat (1997), in two versions:
  - Magnificat (small), for seven-part female choir and bells
  - Magnificat (great), for seven-part female choir, bells, clarinet and string quartet
- De Profundis (1999) for four-part mixed choir and four trombones
- Missa brevis (De Angelis) (1999) for three-part mixed choir and organ
- Veni creator spiritus (2000) for four-part mixed choir, organ and flute ad lib.
- L’ironia bizzarra (2003) for six female voices and harp or piano
- Ave Maris Stella (2003) for five-part mixed choir and organ
- Missa Liturgica (2004) for three-part mixed choir and organ (or strings)
- Agnus tropato (2011), for 3 Choirs (4 mixed voices)
- San Francesco predica agli uccelli (2015), for four-part mixed choir and Vogelstimmen
- Regina pacis (2017), for four-part mixed choir and piano (or Strigs)
- Tu es Sacerdos (2017), for four-part mixed choir and piano (or Strigs)

Chamber music

- La clessidra dai chicchi di grano ("The wheat-grain hourglass") (1983)
- Il mattino della terza giornata ("The morning of the third day") (1983, texts by Beti Jordan)
- Two lieder from Il mattino della terza giornata (1983, texts by Beti Jordan)
- L'acciarino di Weber ("Weber's lock") (1983, for clarinet)
- Gli occhi (chiari) del tempo ("The [clear] eyes of time") (1985, for clarinet and piano)
- Una serata di esercitazioni campali delle termiti guerriere ("An evening of military exercises for the warrior termites") (1985–1996, for five percussionists)
- Un'ipotesi di tango (1991–1995, for guitar)
- Sonata for violin and piano (1995)
- La nebbia di Hietzing ("Hietzing's fog") (1995) for clarinet and string quartet
- Sonata da camera (1996) for violin and eight instruments (flute, clarinet, bassoon, two violins, viola, cello and double bass)
- Due interludi per Orfeo ("Two interludes for Orpheus")(1997) for violin, clarinet and piano
- Gino ed altri angeli ("Gino and other angels") (1997) for soprano, flute and piano
- Le strade di Torquato (The streets of Torquato") (1998) for twelve percussionists
- Buon Anniversario ("Happy birthday") (2001) for five winds and five strings
- Vent’anni dopo ("Twenty years later") (2001) for clarinet
- Canzoni profane ("Secular songs") (2003) for clarinet and string quartet

== Discography ==
- L'acciarino di Weber, Edipan-Rome, 1983
- Gli occhi (chiari) del tempo, Edipan-Rome, 1985
- Rabarbaro, rabarbaro, Edipan-Rome, 1987
- Il Mistero Jacopone, Quadrivium-Perugia, 1992
- Vent'anni dopo, Hyperprysm-Perugia, 2005
- Victimae Paschali laudes and Pater noster, SMU-Italy, 2000
- Requiem, Camerata-Tokyo, 2005

== Partial discography ==
=== Album ===
- 1997 - Rabarbaro rabarbaro - Soloists and Choir of the Lyric Academy of Osimo, Orchestra Filarmonica Marchigiana; Daniele Gatti, Conductor(Edipan-PAN-PRC-S20-53-1LP)
- 1995 - Il Mistero Jacopone - Orchestra Sinfonica della RAI di Torino; Karl Martin, Conductor (Quadrivium-SCA056-1CD)
- 2009 - Angela da Foligno - Chor "M.Alboni"; Orchester "I Solisti di Perugia"; Marcello Marini, choir master; Carlo Pedini, conductor(Quadrivium-QUAD80005-2CD)
- 2010 - Te Deum / Cantico delle creature - Choir "Marietta Alboni"; Orchester "I Solisti di Perugia"; Marcello Marini, choir master; Carlo Pedini, conductor(Quadrivium-QUAD006-1CD)
- 2011 - Requiem - Kusatsu Festival Choir and Orchestra; Fumiaki Kuriyama, choir master; Jörg Ewald Dähler, conductor(Quadrivium-QUAD80008-1CD)
- 2011 - Vespro di Santa Veronica - Chior "M.Alboni"; Orchester "Collegium Tiberinum"; Marcello Marini, conductor(Quadrivium-QUAD00010-1CD)
- 2011 - Magnificat - Choirs "Kamenes In Canto" and "Polifonica Pievese"; Orchester "Città di Arezzo"; Gabriella Rossi, choir master; Francesco Seri, conductor(Quadrivium-QUAD00011-1CD)
- 2018 - Messe, Inni, Mottetti, Madrigali spirituali - "UT - Insieme vocale consonante", Lorenzo Donati conductor; Alessandro Tricomi organ, Fabio Afrune piano(Quadrivium-QUAD00012-2CD)
- 2018 - Carlo Pedini: La musica sacra - BOX with 9 CDs with the entire production of sacred music. Different musicians.(Quadrivium-SCA056, QUAD0005, QUAD006, QUAD008, QUAD00010, QUAD00011, QUAD00012)

=== Compilation ===
- 1986 - "L'acciarino di Weber" in: MUSICISTI CONTEMPORANEI - Ciro Scarponi, clarinet (Edipan-PAN-PRC-S20-31-1LP)
- 1987 - "Gli occhi (chiari) del tempo" in: MUSICISTI CONTEMPORANEI - Ciro Scarponi, clarinet; Stefano Ragni, piano (Edipan-PAN-PRC-S20-45-1LP)
- 2005 - "Vent'anni dopo" in: "IL CLARINETTO DI CIRO SCARPONI" - Ciro Scarponi, clarinet (Hyperprism-LM109-1CD)
- 2005 - "Requiem" in: "The 26th KUSATSU INTERNATIONAL SUMMER FESTIVAL" - Kusatsu Festival Choir and Orchestra; Fumiaki Kuriyama, Chorleiter; Jörg Ewald Dähler, Dirigent (Camerata-Tokyo-CDT1067-1CD)
- 2008 - "Absolve Domine" in: REQUIEM - Fratelli Mancuso, voci e strumenti; Coro "Armoniosoincanto"; Menna String Quartet, Carlo Pedini, Franco Radicchia, Dirigent (Amiata Records-ARNR0308-1CD)
- 2009 - "La Follia" in: I REPERTORI DELLA FONOTECA "ORESTE TROTTA" VOL.2 - Orchester "I Solisti di Perugia"; Carlo Pedini, Dirigent (LaMaggiore-LM121-1CD)
- 2018 - "Le Stagioni non sono più le stesse" - Concerto per violino e orchestra d'archi (2017) - KLK Symphony Orchestra, Marko Komonko Geige, Ferdinando Nazzaro Dirigent . (Quadrivium-Egea-records - QUAD00013-1CD)
- 2019 - "La Follia" für Streicher (2009) - KLK String Orchestra, Ferdinando Nazzaro direttore. (Brilliant Classics 95822-1CD)

== Literature ==
Of eclectic interests, he public in 2012 with the Roman publishing house Cavallo di Ferro her debut novel, The sixth season , selected among the finalists at the LXVI edition of the Premio Strega. Based on the structure of the Thomas Mann's novel Buddenbrooks of which replicates the structure with other original contents, The sixth season is a sort of "experiment of composition" in which the author wanted to apply the rules of musical composition to the creation of a literary text.
