= Giorgi Sibashvili =

Georgian chess player (born 1998)

Personal information
- Born: 8 April 1998 (age 28) Tbilisi, Georgia
- Spouse: Cécile Haussernot (m. 2019)
- Website: modernchess.academy

Chess career
- Country: Georgia
- Title: International Master (2017)
- FIDE rating: 2416 (October 2026)
- Peak rating: 2438 (November 2018)

Giorgi Sibashvili (Georgian: გიორგი სიბაშვილი; born 8 April 1998) is a Georgian chess player who holds the title of International Master (IM). He represented Georgia at the 43rd Chess Olympiad in 2018.

== Chess career ==
Born in Tbilisi, Sibashvili achieved early success in continental youth competitions under the guidance of coaches Giorgi Khomeriki and Khvicha Supatashvili.

In 2012, competing in the Under-14 category, Sibashvili secured a bronze medal at the European Youth Chess Championship in Prague, Czech Republic. In 2014, he upgraded his continental standing by winning the individual silver medal in the Under-16 division at the European Youth Chess Championship in Batumi, Georgia, finishing tied for second place with a score of 7/9. That same year, he added a bronze medal to his youth record at the Stepan Avagyan Memorial international youth tournament in Armenia. In 2018, he won the Georgia U20 Junior Championship in Tbilisi.

Sibashvili was officially awarded the International Master title by FIDE in 2017.

His most prominent international appearance came at the 43rd Chess Olympiad in 2018, held in Batumi. Representing the host country's "Georgia 3" team, Sibashvili delivered a dominant performance on board four, scoring 8 points out of 9 games (+7 =2 −0) without a single defeat. This run earned him an individual tournament performance rating of 2690.

In open tournament play, Sibashvili won the Poti International Chess Festival, drawing against Grandmaster Tornike Sanikidze in the final round. This tournament result allowed him to earn a Grandmaster norm. He also claimed first place at the international open tournament in Keşan, Turkey, finishing with a clear score of 8/9. In club competitions, he won the top individual prize on the youth board while playing in the Turkish First League Club Championship.

== Youth major achievements ==
Year	Championship	Location	Category	Result	Reference
2012	Georgian Youth Chess Championship	Tbilisi, Georgia	U14	(gold) Winner	
2012	European Youth Chess Championship	Prague, Czech Republic	U14	(bronze) Third place	
2014	Georgian Youth Chess Championship	Marneuli, Georgia	U16	(gold) Winner	
2014	European Youth Chess Championship	Batumi, Georgia	U16	(silver) Second place	
2018	Georgian Youth Chess Championship	Tbilisi, Georgia	U20	(gold) Winner	

== Other notable youth tournament placements ==
Year	Championship	Location	Category	Result	Reference
2008	Black Sea Youth Championship	Batumi, Georgia	U10	(silver) Second place	
2009	Georgian Youth Championship	Kutaisi, Georgia	U12	(silver) Second place	
2009	Nana Aleksandria Cup	Poti, Georgia	U12	(gold) Winner	
2009	International Youth Chess Tournament	Baku, Azerbaijan	U12	(silver) Second place	
2010	Nana Aleksandria Cup	Poti, Georgia	U12	(gold) Winner	
2010	International Youth Chess Tournament	Baku, Azerbaijan	U12	(gold) Winner	
2011	Georgian Youth Championship	Poti, Georgia	U14	(bronze) Third place	
2012	Dubai Juniors Chess Championship	Dubai, United Arab Emirates	Open	(silver) Second place	
2012	World Youth Championship	Maribor, Slovenia	U14	6th place	
2013	Georgian Youth Championship	Tbilisi, Georgia	U16	(bronze) Third place	
2014	Stepan Avagyan Memorial	Jermuk, Armenia	U18	(bronze) Third place	
2015	World Youth Stars	St. Petersburg, Russia	Open	(silver) Second place	
2016	Georgian Youth Championship	Tbilisi, Georgia	U18	(bronze) Third place	
2017	Georgian Youth Championship	Tbilisi, Georgia	U20	(bronze) Third place	

== International Open Tournaments ==
Year	Championship	Location	Category	Result	Reference
2014	International Chess Festival "Poti Summer Open"	Poti, Georgia	Open	(gold) Winner	
2017	XII Poti International Chess Festival Open A	Poti, Georgia	Open	(gold) Winner	
2017	3rd Batumi Municipality Cup	Batumi, Georgia	Open	(silver) Second place	

== Fast time control achievements ==
Year	Championship	Location	Category	Result	Reference
2013	V. Dvorkovich Cup	Moscow, Russia	Open Blitz	(bronze) Third place	
2023	52th UAE National Day Tournament - Abu Dhabi	Abu Dhabi, United Arab Emirates	Open Blitz	(silver) Second place	
2024	29th Sharjah International Chess Championship	Sharjah, United Arab Emirates	Open Rapid	(silver) Second place	
2024	29th Sharjah International Chess Championship	Sharjah, United Arab Emirates	Open Blitz	(bronze) Third place	
2024	Gran Prix d'Escacs d’Andorra la Vella	Andorra la Vella, Andorra	Open Blitz	(bronze) Third place	
2024	53rd UAE National Day Tournament - Abu Dhabi	Abu Dhabi, United Arab Emirates	Open Blitz	(bronze) Third place	
2025	DCCC January Rapid Tournament 2025	Dubai, United Arab Emirates	Open Blitz	(gold) Winner	
2025	Italian International School	Abu Dhabi, United Arab Emirates	Open Blitz	(silver) Second place	
2025	IIS Ramadan Festival	Abu Dhabi, United Arab Emirates	Open Blitz	(gold) Winner	
2026	3rd IIC Open Chess Tournament	Abu Dhabi, United Arab Emirates	Open Blitz	(gold) Winner	
2026	Jeddah Chess Season	Jeddah, Saudi Arabia	Open Rapid	(silver) Second place	

== Coaching and content creation ==
In addition to competitive play, Sibashvili works as a chess coach and content creator. He holds a degree from the Georgian State Sports University and has served as an assistant chess professor. He is the founder of the Modern Chess Academy, an online platform where he publishes instructional chess video courses in English..

Sibashvili is also the founder of Chadraki.ge, a Georgian online chess education platform. The website provides instructional video courses in Georgian language.

== Personal life ==
Sibashvili is married to French Woman International Master (WIM) Cécile Haussernot. They lived together in Tbilisi, Georgia, from 2018 to 2022, before relocating to Abu Dhabi, United Arab Emirates, in 2022. They frequently collaborate on online chess coaching and digital chess content.
