= Franziska von Hoffnaaß =

German poet (1831–1892)

Franziska Romana Ursula "Fanny" von Hoffnaaß (1831–1892; née Franziska Jägerhuber) was a German poet and the wife of the composer Josef Gabriel Rheinberger.

== Life ==
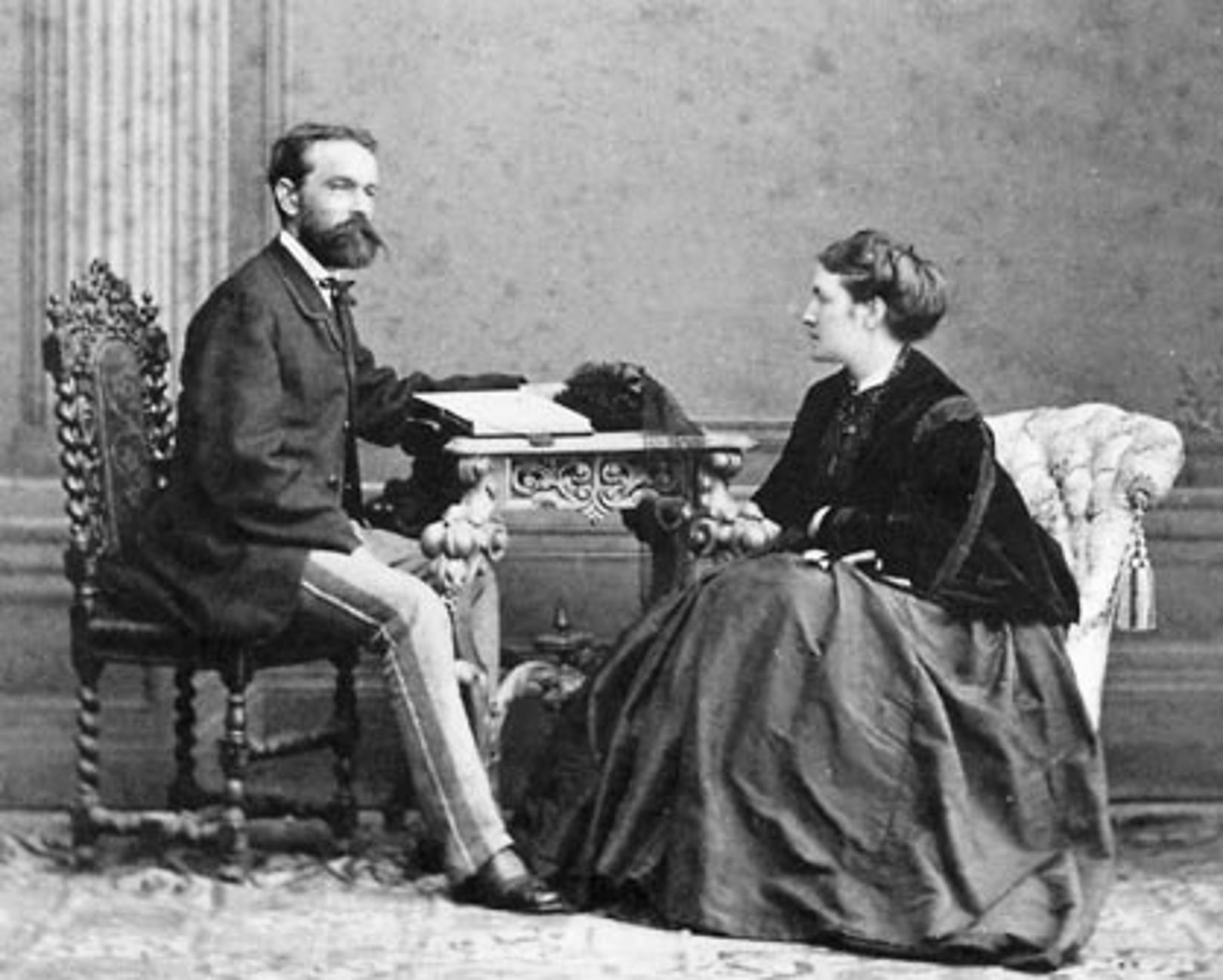
Josef and Fanny Rheinberger in 1869.

Franziska von Hoffnaaß was born 18 October 1831, at Maxlrain Castle, Upper Bavaria. Franziska von Hoffnaaß was an educated woman who was fluent in several languages and active in the arts. She played music, drew, and was a writer—in addition to poems, she also published a travel guide. In 1852, she married Lieutenant Ludwig von Hoffnaaß (1828–1865), a grandson of the Mannheim painter Johann Wilhelm Hoffnas. After Hoffnaaß's death, she married the composer Josef Gabriel Rheinberger, who came from Liechtenstein and worked in Munich, in 1867. After their marriage, Rheinberger acquired citizenship for her in the Principality of Liechtenstein. Fanny Rheinberger left behind diaries and letters that are of historical interest and are also revealing about her life with Rheinberger. They reflect her significant influence on Rheinberger's compositional work.

Fanny advised her husband on matters of text selection. She wrote the libretto for his oratorio Christoforus (Op. 120), which premiered in 1882 in the large hall of the Leipzig Buchhändlerbörse (Book Trade Exchange), as well as for the singspiel Das Zauberwort (Op. 153) of 1888, freely adapted from the story of Caliph Stork. Rheinberger's Christmas cantata Der Stern von Bethlehem, Op. 164, is based on her 1889 cycle of poems Der Stern von Bethlehem. The score was published in 1891, but the piano reduction was not released until Christmas 1892, a week before Franziska's death on New Year's Eve 1892, following weeks of serious illness. She died on 31 December 1892, in Munich.

Out of grief that never truly subsided, Rheinberger never attended a single one of the numerous performances of their last joint work. He later said of the cantata: "The true essence of the music is the longing for a happiness that always eludes us." After Josef Rheinberger's death, Fanny was exhumed and reburied next to her husband in the Alter Südfriedhof (Old Southern Cemetery) in Munich (Neue Arkaden, plot 101 in section 42). Today, only a memorial plaque remains. The original tombstone by Heinrich Jobst was destroyed by aerial bombs during the Second World War. The remains of Josef and Fanny Rheinberger were transferred to Vaduz in 1949.
