= Hans Eugen Frischknecht =

Swiss composer and musician

Hans Eugen Frischknecht (born 8 May 1939) is a Swiss composer, organist, choral conductor and harpsichordist.

== Life ==
Born in St. Gallen, Frischknecht graduated from the Swiss Music Pedagogic Association after his school-leaving exams as a piano teacher (SMPV). From 1959 to 1962, he studied composition with Boris Blacher, counterpoint with Ernst Pepping, organ (final examination) with Michael Schneider and twelve-tone music with Josef Rufer at the Universität der Künste Berlin. in der MusicSack-Datenbank From 1962 to 1964 he continued his training with Olivier Messiaen (courses in analysis), in organ with Gaston Litaize and in harpsichord with Robert Veyron-Lacroix at the Conservatoire de Paris. Until 1969, he studied music theory (teaching diploma) with Theo Hirsbrunner and Jörg Ewald Dähler at the Hochschule der Künste Bern.

As organist and harpsichordist, he gave concerts in Europe and the USA. From 1964 to 2002, he was organist and choirmaster at the Protestant-Reformed Johanneskirche in the Breitenrain quarter of Bern. In 1970, he founded and took over the direction of the International Society for Contemporary Music Vocal Soloists Bern. In 1980, he conducted the world premiere of the Madrigal by Manfred Trojahn. From 1983 to 2003, he taught improvisation and theory at the Hochschule der Künste Bern in Biel.

Frischknecht was President of the Bern City Association of the International Society for New Music (IGNM) from 1977 to 1988. He served as President of the local Swiss Music Pedagogical Association (SMPV) in Bern from 1978 to 1990. He was also for many years president of the SMPV. In 2002/03, he was a founding member of the Festival L'art pour l'Aar in Bern.

In addition to organ, piano and harpsichord pieces, he composed mainly chamber music and choral works. They have been performed in Europe and the United States by the Sinfonieorchester St. Gallen and the Ensemble Sortisatio, among others.

Frischknecht is married to the organist Eliane Kneuss and lives in Muri near Bern.

== Awards ==
- 1964: Premier Prix of the Classe d'Analyse at the Conservatoire de Paris
- 1971: First prize at the St Albans International Organ Festival in England

== Recordings ==
- Orgelwerke (Pro, 1992)
- Musik für meine Freunde (Classic, 1995)
- Festival l'art pour l'Aar 2003 (Müller & Schade, 2005)
- Festival l'art pour l'Aar 2005 (Müller & Schade, 2006)

== Publications ==
- Rhythmen und Dauerwerte im Livre d’Orgue von Olivier Messiaen. In Musik und Gottesdienst 22 (1968) 1, pp. 1–12.
- Kirchenmusik auf falschem Weg. In Musik und Gottesdienst 22 (1968) 1.
- Jugend und Avantgarde. In Schweizerische Musikzeitung 116 (1976) 4, pp. 273–277.
- Die geistliche Musik von Olivier Messiaen. In Musik und Gottesdienst 32 (1978) 6, pp. 189–199.
- Vergleichende Musiktheorie. In Schweizerische Musikzeitung 119 (1979) 5, pp. 262–268.
- Wie laut soll eine Orgel sein. In Musik und Gottesdienst 34 (1980) 5. p. .157-164.
- Komponist – Elfenbeinturm – Laie. In Neue Musik für Jugendliche und Laien (1980), pp. 23–26.
- Sätze zu Chorälen des Kirchengesangsbuches. In Musik und Gottesdienst 43 (1989) 3. p. 126.
- Geistliche Musik und Orgelmusik der letzten Jahre. In Musik und Gottesdienst 44 (1990) 5. pp. 233–247.
- Zum Gedenken an Olivier Messiaen. In Musik und Gottesdienst 46 (1992), p. 273.
- Abriss der Musikgeschichte seit 1945. Ein Leitfaden für Musikstudierende. In Schweizer Musikpädagogische Blätter 85 (1997) 2, pp. 84–88. (Digitalisiert; PDF; 157 kB)
- Die Rosinen aus den Kantionalsätzen herausgenommen. In Musik und Gottesdienst 55 (2001) 3,pp. 52–56.
- Von der römischen Windlade zur Viertelton-Orgel. Streifzüge durch den schweizerischen Orgelbau. In Musik & Kirche 74 (2004), 1, pp. 26–33.
- Ein oder mehrere Achtflüsse? In Musik und Gottesdienst 62 (2008) 1, pp. 18–23.
- Potential und Grenzen einer musikalischen Sprache. Olivier Messiaens « Modes à transpositions limitées » unter der Lupe. In Dissonanz 104 (2008), pp. 32–34.
