= Daniel Glaus =

Swiss composer

Daniel Glaus (born 16 July 1957 in Bern) is a Swiss organist and composer. He is currently professor at the Zurich University of the Arts, the University of the Arts Bern and organist of the Bern Cathedral.

== Life ==
Glaus studied in Bern, Freiburg im Breisgau and Paris. He studied music theory (Theo Hirsbrunner), composition Klaus Huber, Brian Ferneyhough), organ (Heinrich Gurtner, Gaston Litaize, Daniel Roth, Luigi Ferdinando Tagliavini, Harald Vogel, Gerd Zacher) and direction (Erich Schmid). So far he has worked as a composer, church musician (City Church of Biel, Berner Münster) and is professor at the Zurich University of the Arts for composition and instrumentation, and at the University of the Arts Bern for organ and composition. Glaus also performs internationally as an organist and is involved in organ building. For example, as part of his research project Innov-Organ-um, he and his team developed a wind-dynamic organ in which the dynamics, timbre and pitch can be influenced by simply controlling the keys. Co-initiator of the IV International Congress for Church Music Ittingen 1997 as a continuation of the three church music congresses in Bern 1952, 1962 and 1972.

Glaus was influenced by encounters with composers such as Pierre Boulez, Gérard Grisey, Heinz Holliger, György Ligeti, Tristan Murail, Luigi Nono and Iannis Xenakis; outside the realm of composition, he also considers Augustinus von Hippo to be important, Massimo Cacciari, Heraclitus, Meister Eckhart, Maimonides, Plato, Rainer Maria Rilke, Emanuel Swedenborg, the Sohar and natural phenomena in general.

His works are performed by renowned musicians and orchestras (The Hilliard Ensemble, Christoph Poppen, Thomas Zehetmair, Fabrice Bollon, Mario Venzago, Christian Arming, Munich Chamber Orchestra, Deutsche Radio Philharmonie, The New Japan Philharmonic, sinfonietta basel, Bern Symphony Orchestra etc.) at international festivals (Dresden Music Festival, Lucerne Festival, Junifestwochen Zurich, Kasseler Musiktage, Biennale Bern, Kultursommer Altenberg etc.).

== Work ==
- Orgelstücke (von Umfang und Dauer von wenigen Minuten bis zur komplexeren 25-minütigen Kirchen (-Raum-) Musik)
- Vocal music (five Oratorios Hüllen des Abgrunds (1986/87) and Sunt lacrimae rerum (1988/89), Komposition zu Meister Eckhart (1994/95), Sola quae cantat audit et cui cantatur (2008/09), Von den vier Enden der Welten (2010/11) several cantatas, motets, Lieder für Solostimme oder mit Begleitung)
- Chamber music (three string quartets with the respective name "No. 1-3", solo pieces, duos, trios, fugue for string quartet and others, cycles like in hora mortis, nine attempts at the Gregorian Missa pro defunctis for piano trio (1987–93)
- Orchestra werke Traum (1978/79) for winds and strings, Florestan und Eusebius für zwei Orchester (1981), Meteorsteine (with saxophon, 1987), Sephiroth-Symphonien Nr. 1–4 (1999–2004)
- Cycle De Angelis (in memoriam Luigi Nono, 1990–1993):
  - De Angelis I: Organ
  - De Angelis II: Choir
  - De Angelis II: Duo für Flöte und Orgel mit mechanischer Registertraktur
  - De Angelis IV: Motetten und Gesänge zum Karfreitag
  - De Angelis V: 2 Orgeln, improvisierende Klarinettisten und 3 Instrumentalensembles
- zwei Kammeropern Zerstreute Wege (mit 4-Kanal-Tonband, 1981–1983) and Die hellen Nächte (with accordion, 1987–1997)
