= Gabor G. Gyukics =

American poet

Gabor G. Gyukics (/ˈjuːkɪtʃ/ YOO-kitch; born May 9, 1958) is a Hungarian American poet and literary translator. He is known for translating American poetry to Hungarian and Hungarian poetry to English. Gabor G. Gyukics is a member of the Szépírók Társasága – Hungarian Society of Writers, Critics and Literary Translators

== Life ==
Gyukics was born in Hungary in 1958. He left Hungary for Holland in 1986. In 1988, he moved to the U.S., where he worked until moving back to Budapest in 2002.

== Career ==
Gyukics was the founder of a series of open poetry readings combined with jazz in Hungary starting in1999. His current work focuses on translations of Native American poetry and American poetry. Gyukics and Michael Castro used to collaborate on translations of contemporary poems from Hungarian to English between 1989 and 2000. Together, they also translated the poetry of Attila József.

=== Prizes and fellowships ===
- Hungary Beat Poet Laureate (Lifetime), National Beat Poetry Foundation, Wolcott, Connecticut, 2020
- Milán Füst translation prize, Hungarian Academy of Science, Budapest 1999, 2017, 2025
- Poesis 25 Prize for Poetry, Satu Mare, Romania 2015
- Salvatore Quasimodo Special Prize for Poetry, Balatonfüred, Hungary 2012
- ArtsLink Project Award, New York 1999

=== Book fairs and festivals ===
- Zetna Literary Festival, Zenta, Serbia, 2026
- Malom Festival, Orom, Serbia, 2025
- REverse Poetry Festival, Out Loud Poetry, Timisoara, Romania, 2024
- Tricikli Festival, Szeged-Magyarkanizsa, Hungary-Serbia, 2023
- Festival Palabra en el Mundo, Venice, Italy, 2023
- International Book Festival Budapest, 2000, 2022
- Elba Poetry Festival, Elba, Italy, 2022
- National Beat Poetry Festival, Pleasant Valley/Barkhamsted, Connecticut, USA, 2021
- Prague International Literary Festival, Prague, Czech Republic, 2019
- Cairo International Book Fair, Cairo, Egypt, 2019
- ProtimluvFest International literary festival, Ostrava, Czech Republic, 2017
- Tanta International Poetry Festival, 2nd Edition, Tanta, Egypt, 2016
- The 1st 100 Thousand Poets for Change Festival, Salerno, Italy 2015
- The 25th Poesis Poetry Festival, Satu Mare, Romania 2015
- The 10th Novi Sad International Literary Festival, Novi Sad, Serbia 2015
- Sofia International Book Fair, Sofia, Bulgaria 2013
- The 12th 'Den poezie' Festival, Prague, Czech Republic 2010
- Cúirt International Festival of Literature, Galway, Ireland 2004
- Culture of Wine Festival in Sofia, Bulgaria 2000
- Blue Metropolis Montreal International Literary Festival, Canada 2000

=== Original poetry ===
- Utcai Elődás, poetry in Hungarian, Fekete Sas Publishing, Budapest, 1998; ISBN 963 8254 45 9
- Last Smile, English-Hungarian, Cross Cultural Communications, New York, 1999, Preface by Hal Sirowitz; ISBN 0-89304-372-9
- A remete többes száma, poetry in Hungarian, Fekete Sas Publishing, Budapest, 2002; ISBN 963-9352-45-4
- versKÉPzelet, poetry and writings on art in Hungarian and 22 works by 20 contemporary fine artists, Hanga Publishing, Budapest, 2005; ISBN 963-86643-1-2
- Lepkék vitrinben, poetry in Hungarian, Fekete Sas Publishing, Budapest, 2006; ISBN 963-9680-00-1
- kié ez az arc, poems in Hungarian, L’Harmattan Publishing, Budapest, 2011; ISBN 978-963-236-439-1
- Selected Poetry of Gabor Gyukics in Bulgarian, translated by Stefka Hrusanova, Gutenberg Publishing House, Sofia, Bulgaria, 2013; ISBN 978-619-176-008-4
- A Hermit Has no Plural, poems in English, Singing Bone Press, Columbia, SC, USA 2015; ISBN 978-0-933439-05-4
- végigtapint selected poetry in Hungarian, Lector Publishing, Târgu Mureș, Romania,2018; ISBN 978-606-8957-01-2
- kié ez az arc, poems in Arabic, translated by Abdallah Naggar, Sanabel, Cairo, Egypt 2019; ISBN 978-977-5255-54-9
- kié ez az arc, poems in Czech, translated by Robert Svoboda, Protimluv Press, Ostrava, Czech Republic 2019 ISBN 978-80-87485-65-1
- Detoxification of the Body, poetry in English, El Martillo Press, Los Angeles, CA, USA, 2024; ISBN 979-8-8692-1429-4
- L’evoluzione degli armadillo / The Evolution of Armadillos, poetry in Italian and English, translated by Anna Lombardo Persephone Edizioni, Elba, Italy 2025; ISBN 979-12-81147-28-7
- Az armadilló evolúciója poetry in Hungarian, illustrated by Ádám Würtz Junior, Ampersand Press, Hungary 2026 ISBN 978-615-6402-82-0
- Poémes choisis, 17 poems in French translated and published by Christophe Martin, Lille, France, 2026 - no ISBN

=== Original prose ===
- Ginsberg & Co. és egyéb spirálok, short stories in Hungarian, Tiszatáj Publishing, Szeged, 2026 ISBN 978-6155618-55-0
- Kisfa galeri «socio-horror», in Hungarian, L’Harmattan Publishing, Budapest, 2014 ISBN 978-963-236-842-9

=== Translations ===
- Half-Naked Muse / Félmeztelen múzsa, Contemporary American Poetry Anthology, bilingual, Budapest, Magyar Könyvklub Publishing 2000; ISBN 963-547-125-4
- Swimming in the Ground, Contemporary Hungarian Poetry Anthology in English, Neshui Publishing, St. Louis, USA, 2002 Co-translator: Michael Castro; ISBN 1-931190-26-7
- Gypsy Drill, Collected poems of Attila Balogh in English, Neshui Publishing, St. Louis, USA, 2005 Co-translator: Michael Castro
- Consciousness, Attila József DVD English version, Petőfi Literary Museum, 2005 Budapest
- A Transparent Lion, Selected poetry of Attila József in English, Green Integer Publishing, 2006 Los Angeles, USA, Co-translator: Michael Castro; ISBN 1-933382-50-3
- Átkelés, Contemporary American Poetry Anthology in Hungarian, Nyitott Könyvműhely, 2007 Budapest; ISBN 978-963-9725-08-9
- A szem önéletrajza, Selected poetry of Paul Auster in Hungarian, Barrus Publishing, 2007 Budapest;ISBN 978-963-86725-7-5
- Cornucopion / Bőségszaru, Selected poetry of Ira Cohen in Hungarian, I.A.T. and Új Mandátum Publishing, 2007 Budapest; ISBN 978-9-639609-64-8
- Nagy Kis-Madár, the poetry of Jim Northrup, Új Forrás and Librarius Publishings, 2013 Tata, Hungary;ISBN 978-963-7983-17-7
- My God, How Many Mistakes I've Made, Selected poetry of Endre Kukorelly, co - translator Michael Castro, Singing Bone Press, USA 2015; ISBN 978-0-933439-04-7
- Medvefelhő a város felett, Contemporary Native American poetry anthology in Hungarian, Budapest, Scolar Publishing, 2015, ISBN 9789632445960
- The Heart Attacks of the Soul, Gypsy Cantos, selected poetry of Attila Balogh, co-translator Michael Castro, Singing Bone Press, Charleston, SC, USA, 2018 ISBN 978 0 933439 18 4
- "They'll be Good for Seed", Contemporary Hungarian Poetry Anthology in English, White Pine Press, Buffalo, USA, 2021; ISBN 978-1-945680-49-6
- Viselnéd a szemem, American Poetry and Prose in Hungarian, Károli University Press - L'Harmattan Publishing, 2021 Budapest ISBN 978-963-414-809-8
- "Shelter Under the Sun", Poetry of Three Hungarian Women in English, Singing Bone Press, Columbia, SC, USA, 2021; ISBN 978-0933439313
- "Nélkülözhetetlen Allen Ginsberg", Hungarian editor and translator et al. of the Hungarian version of Essential Allen Ginsberg,Europa Publishing House, Budapest, 2022 ISBN 978 963 504 623 2
- "Silence and Other Poems" by Károly Bari, El Martillo Press, Los Angeles, USA; 2026 ISBN 979-8-8689-3462-9

=== CDs ===
- Vibration of Words, jazz poetry in English, Origo Studio, Budapest, 2018. Music: Ágoston Béla soprano and C melody saxophones, alto clarinet, kaval, glissonic, fijura, Bori Viktor piano, Pengő Csaba double bass, Gabor G Gyukics poetry
- Beépített arcok, jazz poetry in Hungarian, Origo Studio, Budapest, 2018. Music: Ágoston Béla soprano and C melody saxophones, alto clarinet, kaval, glissonic, fijura, Bori Viktor piano, Dóra Attila soprano saxophone, bass clarinet, Eichinger Tibor guitar, Gabor G Gyukics poetry
- Sand Snail, English language poetry; Frogpond Productions, New York, 2000. Music: Mark Deutsch. Guest Poet: Nagy Imola Borzos

=== Exhibition ===
- The Afterlife of a Book; the poetry of Gábor G. Gyukics with the eyes of contemporary fine artists, 15 poems –19 artists – 21 artworks, Mucius Gallery, Budapest April 11- May 12, 2005
- Versvonzatok; the poetry of Gábor G. Gyukics with the eyes of contemporary fine artists. 21 poems – 21 artists – 25 artworks, Petőfi Literary Museum, Budapest, December 4, 2018- January 20, 2019

=== Magazines ===
- Látó literary magazine American issue 2006/5; guest editor, translator

=== Films ===
- The Understudy, comedy. Directed By Scott Crocker. A struggling actor loses his memory after a sharp blow to the head. 1994
- Dictatorship of Taste, documentary on Hungarian poets and their poetry, a cutting edge documentary on European iron curtain artists who exist beyond the "margin of the margin of culture." Created by Brad Hodge and Derek Elz, 2008.
