= Gyula Juhász =

Gyula Juhász may refer to:

- Gyula Juhász (poet) (1883–1937), Hungarian poet
- Gyula Juhász (sculptor) (1876–1913), Hungarian sculptor, medallist
- Gyula Juhász (historian) (1930–1993), Hungarian historian
