= Jörg Ewald Dähler =

Swiss musician

- Born: 16 March 1933; Bern, Switzerland
- Died: 3 November 2018 (aged 85); Bern, Switzerland

Jörg Ewald Dähler (16 March 1933 – 3 November 2018), was a Swiss conductor, harpsichordist, fortepiano player and composer.

== Life ==
Born in Bern, Dähler, son of the reformed pastor Karl Walter Dähler (1903–1986), grew up in Langnau im Emmental. He then attended the teacher training college in Hofwil. At the Hochschule für Musik in Bern, he graduated as a teacher of piano and then studied harpsichord at the Musikhochschule in Freiburg im Breisgau.

He taught basso continuo, chamber music, and choral conducting at the Bern Conservatory of Music and at the Schola Cantorum Basiliensis. His pupils included Olive Emil Wetter and Hans Eugen Frischknecht. From 1965 to 1998, he conducted concerts in Bern, at the Bätterkinden Gasthof Krone and the Hindelbank castle, and from 1974 onwards, the Bern Chamber Choir.

He also practised drawing. He illustrated two collections of short stories by his father, written in the Bern dialect of German: "Momou das git's" (Langnau im Emmental, 1983) and Ou das het's ggä (idem, 1986).

== Works ==
- Das Passionsgeschehen nach dem Evangelisten Lukas (The Passion event according to Luke the Evangelist). For 8-voice mixed choir, narrator, trombone quartet, and organ. 1987.
- As editor:
  - Tomaso Albinoni, Concerto in D major op. 7 no. 1
  - François Devienne, 6 Sonatas, opus 24 for bassoon and basso continuo - Accolade-Musikverlag
  - Galuppi, Magnificat in G
  - Vivaldi, Concerto in A major
  - Vivaldi, Concerto for 2 trumpets, strings, and basso continuo in C major

== Recordings ==
- Bach, Flute Sonata in E major, BWV 1035 - Peter Lukas Graf, flute (Claves Records CD 50-401)
- Bach, Goldberg Variations (1986, Claves)
- Devienne, Six Sonatas for bassoon and basso continuo (Claves CD 50-9207)
- Galuppi, Musiche Veneziane, Concerti e Sinfonie (1976, Claves CD 508306) OCLC 1040113294
- Galuppi, "Passatempo al Cembalo" - Sonatas for the Harpsichord. - Claves D - 603 (LP) (1976).
- Keiser, Markus Passion - Gemischter Chor Zweisimmen (Claves)
- Schubert, Winterreise - Ernst Haefliger, tenor (September 1980, Claves) OCLC 890804017
- Schubert, Schwanengesang - Ernst Haefliger, tenor (1985, Claves) OCLC 637752983
- Schubert, Sonatas in A major and A minor D 664 - on a Brodmann piano, 1820 (March 1978, Claves) OCLC 20868313
- Schubert, Sonatas D 605a, D 960 (1980, Claves) OCLC 900320095
- Schubert, Impromptus, op. 90 and 142 (July 1975, Claves) OCLC 953014707
- Schubert, Trios with piano D 898 and D 28 (12-15 novembre 1990, Claves) OCLC 659311465
- Vivaldi, Concerto in B minor op. 3 N 10 for 4 violins, cello, strings and harpsichord (1970, Claves) on Music Brain
