= Balatonszárszó =

- Village
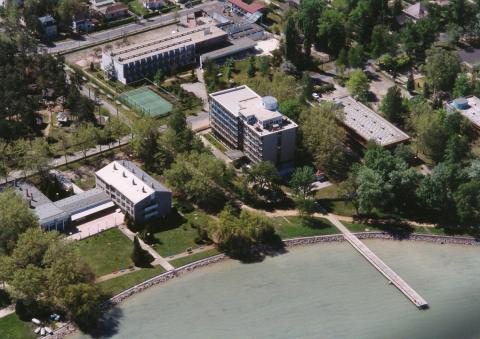
- Hotels of Balatonszárszó

- Coat of arms

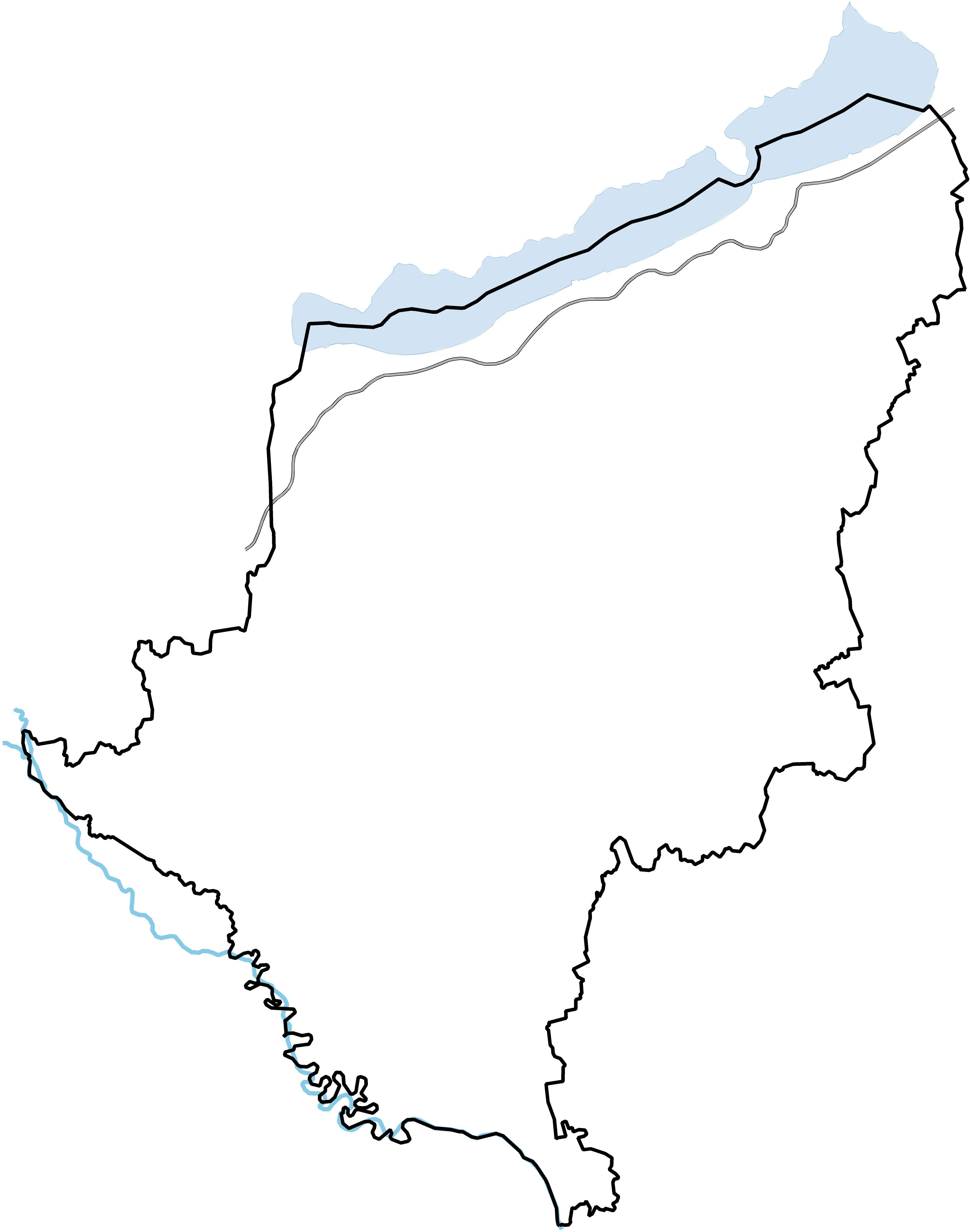
- Location of Balatonszárszó Balatonszárszó (Hungary)
- Coordinates: 46.82954°N 17.83510°E
- Country: Hungary
- Region: Southern Transdanubia
- County: Somogy
- District: Siófok
- RC Diocese: Kaposvár

Area
  - Total: 30.13 km^{2} (11.63 sq mi)

Population (2017)
  - Total: 2,013
  - Density: 66.81/km^{2} (173.0/sq mi)
- Demonym(s): szárszói, balatonszárszói
- Time zone: UTC+1 (CET)
  - Summer (DST): UTC+2 (CEST)
- Postal code: 8624
- Area code: (+36) 84
- Patron Saint: Mary Magdalene
- Motorways: M7
- Distance from Budapest: 128 km (80 mi) Northeast
- NUTS 3 code: HU232
- MP: Mihály Witzmann (Fidesz)
- Website: Balatonszárszó Online

Balatonszárszó is a village along the southern shore of Lake Balaton in Somogy County, Hungary. The settlement is part of the Balatonboglár wine region, and belongs to the region of Southern Transdanubia. The village is famous for being the home and place of death of the renowned Hungarian poet József Attila.

== History ==
The village was first inhabited in the Neolithic, and archeological remains suggest it has been continuously inhabited since then. It is first mentioned in writing in 1082 by the name Zarrosozow, but this early medieval village lays about 1 km (0.62 mi) south of the current village. Under the Turkish occupation, the village was depopulated and repopulated multiple times.

Following Rákóczi's War of Independence, the village entered a more stable and prosperous period, and in 1733, the village came under control of the Hunyady family. Education was available in Catholic schools starting in 1743, and in Reformed schools starting in 1800. The village's classical-style reformed church was built in 1843.

In the 19th century, the village underwent rapid development and industrialization. By the end of the 19th century, tourism and bathing culture began to develop in the village as well.

The village lost 50 young men in the First World War, and 34 in the Second World War. In 1943, the village hosted a famous conference called the "Szárszó Conference" discussing the state, fate, and future of the Hungarian people following the Second World War.

== Demographics ==
As of 2023, the village had a total population of 2067. As of 2022, the town was 87.9% Hungarian, 2.5% German, 0.2% Gypsy, and 3% of non-European origin. The remainder chose not to respond. The population was 30.1% Roman Catholic, 14.8% Reformed, and 4.7% Lutheran.

== Notable residents ==
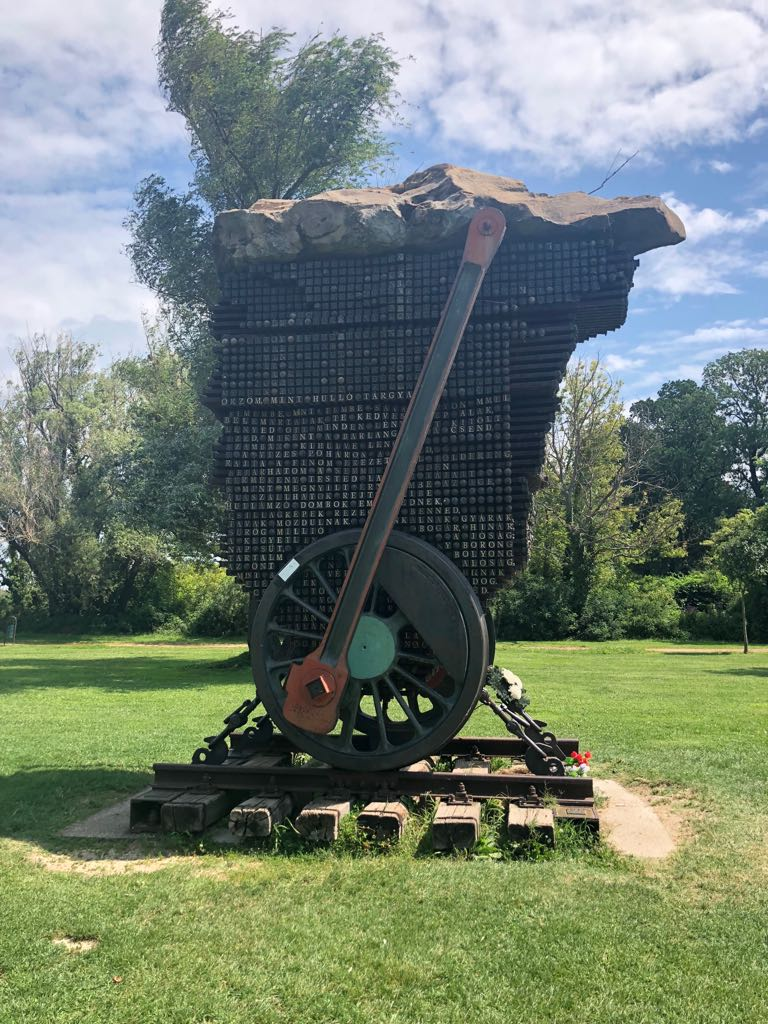
Memorial to Attila József

- Attila József (1905-1937), Hungarian poet
- Gyula J. Obádovics (born 1927), Hungarian mathematician, Dr. Techn., Dr. Rer. nat., professor emeritus
- Tivadar Farkasházy (born 1945), Hungarian humorist, author, and journalist
