= Orgel =

Orgel is a surname, and may refer to:

- Doris Orgel (born 1929), children's literature author
- Leslie Orgel (1927–2007), British chemist
- Stephen Orgel (21st century), Professor of English at Stanford University

== See also ==
- Organ (music) (in Dutch: orgel, and in German: Orgel)
- Music box (in Japanese: オルゴール, romanized: orugōru / orgel)
- Orgle (a kind of Llama).
