= Josef Rheinberger =

German composer and organist (1839–1901)

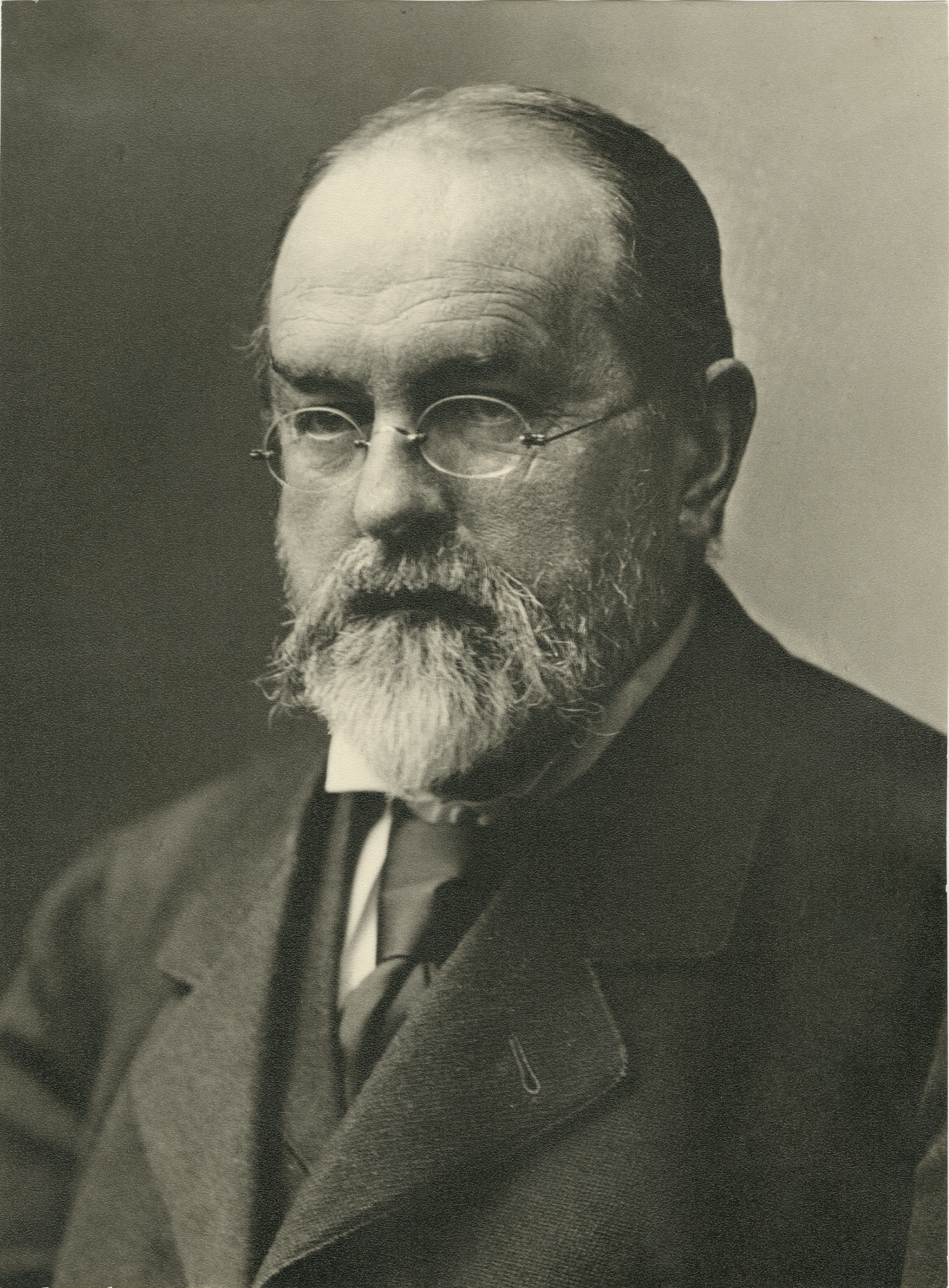
- Born: 17 March 1839; Vaduz, Liechtenstein
- Died: 25 November 1901 (aged 62); Munich, Bavaria
- Education: Munich Conservatorium
- Occupations: Composer; Organist
- Relatives: Peter Rheinberger (brother); Hermine Rheinberger (niece)

Josef Gabriel Rheinberger (17 March 1839 – 25 November 1901) was a composer and organist from Liechtenstein, residing in Bavaria for most of his life. As court conductor in Munich, he was responsible for the music in the royal chapel. He is known for sacred music, works for organ and vocal works, such as masses, a Christmas cantata and the motet Abendlied; he also composed two operas and three singspiele, incidental music, secular choral music, two symphonies and other instrumental works, chamber music, and works for organ.

== Life and career ==
Rheinberger was born on 17 March 1839 in Vaduz as the son of Johann Peter Rheinberger and his mother Elisabeth Carigiet as one of eleven children, including his brother Peter Rheinberger.

When only seven years old, he was already serving as organist at the Vaduz parish church, and his first composition was performed the following year. In 1849, he studied with composer Philipp M. Schmutzer in Feldkirch, Vorarlberg.

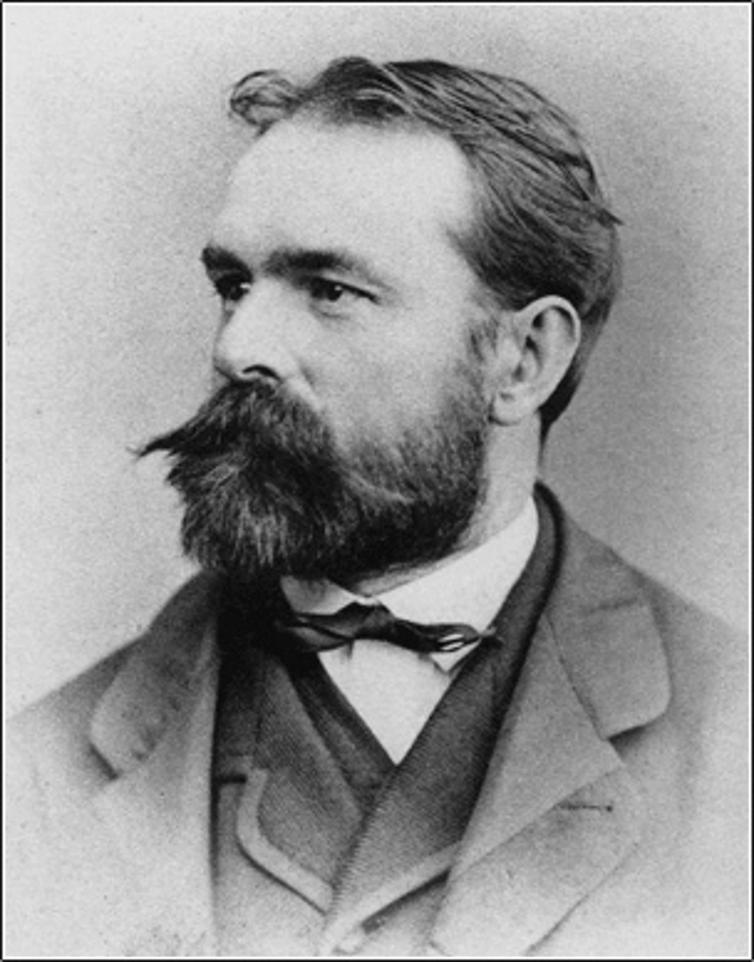
Rheinberger as a younger man

In 1851, his father, who had initially opposed his son's desire to embark on the life of a professional musician, relented and allowed him to enter the Munich Conservatorium. Not long after graduating, he became professor of piano and of composition at the same institution. When this first version of the Munich Conservatorium was dissolved, he was appointed répétiteur at the Court Theatre, from which he resigned in 1867.

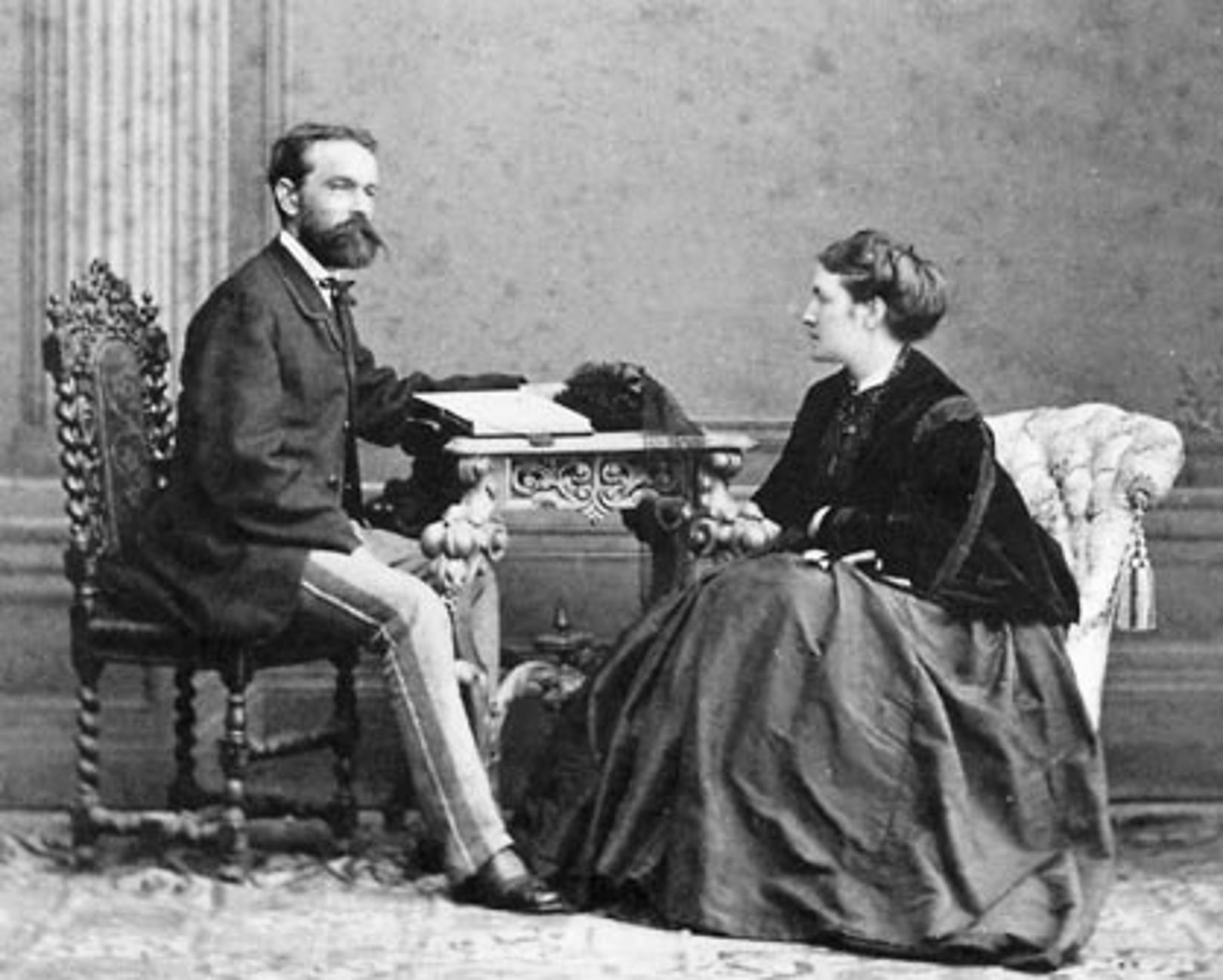
Josef and Fanny shortly after their marriage

Rheinberger married his former pupil, the poet and socialite Franziska von Hoffnaaß in 1867. They had no children. Franziska wrote the texts for much of her husband's vocal work.

The stylistic influences on Rheinberger ranged from contemporaries such as Brahms to composers from earlier times, such as Mendelssohn, Schumann, Schubert and, above all, Bach.

In 1877, he was appointed court conductor, responsible for the music in the royal chapel. He was subsequently awarded an honorary doctorate by the Ludwig-Maximilians-Universität München (LMU). A distinguished teacher, he numbered many Americans among his pupils, including Horatio Parker, William Berwald, George Whitefield Chadwick, Bruno Klein, Sidney Homer and Henry Holden Huss. Other students of his included important figures from Europe: Italian composer Ermanno Wolf-Ferrari, Serbian composer Stevan Stojanovic Mokranjac, and German composers Engelbert Humperdinck and Richard Strauss and the conductor (and composer) Wilhelm Furtwängler. See: List of music students by teacher: R to S#Josef Rheinberger. When the second (and present) Munich Conservatorium was founded, Rheinberger was appointed Royal Professor of organ and composition, a post he held for the rest of his life.

On 31 December 1892, after a long illness, his wife died and two years later poor health led him to give up the post of Court Music Director.

His religious works include twelve masses (one for double chorus, three for four voices a cappella, three for women's voices and organ, two for men's voices and one with orchestra), a Requiem and a Stabat Mater. His other works include several operas, symphonies, chamber music, and choral works.

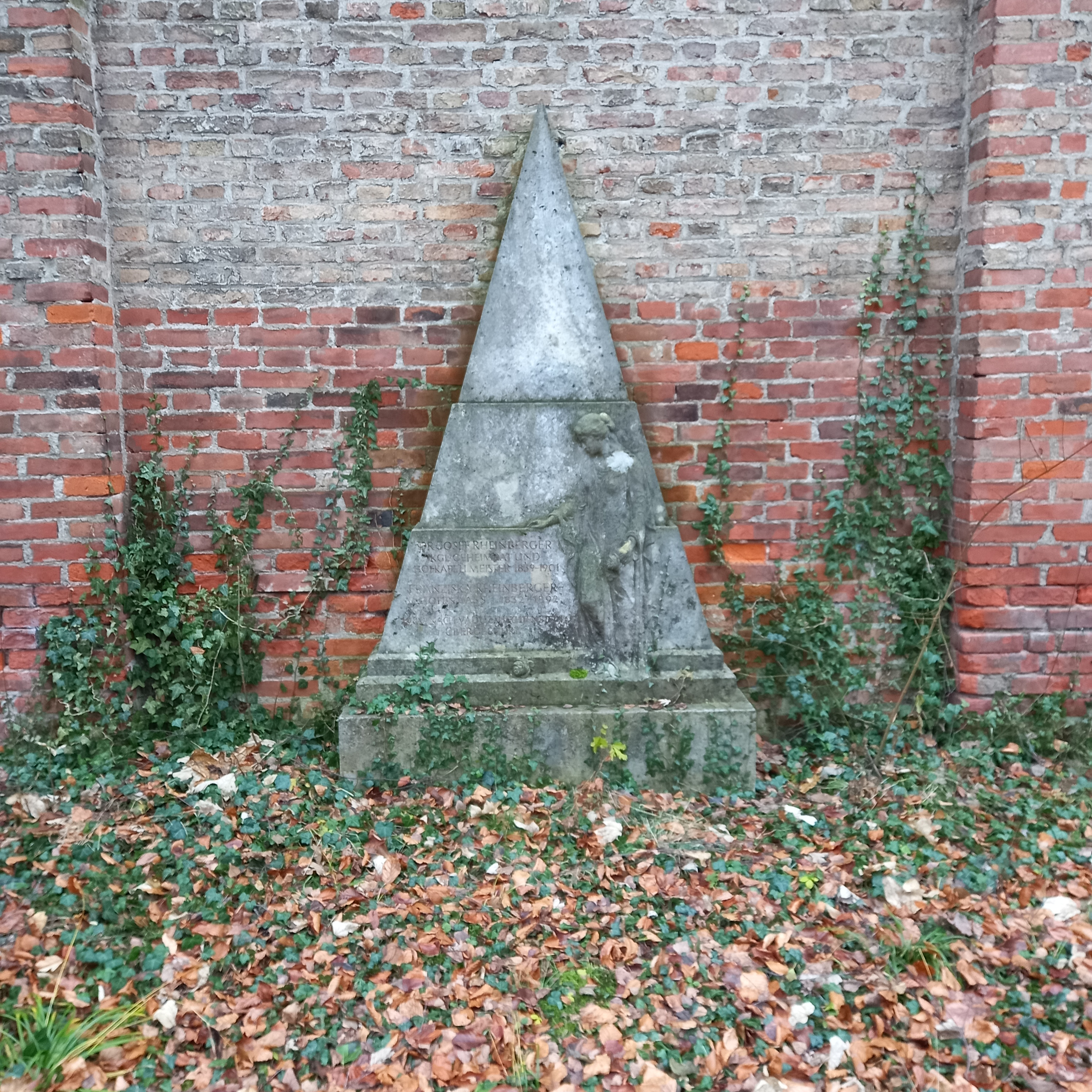
The former grave in Munich.

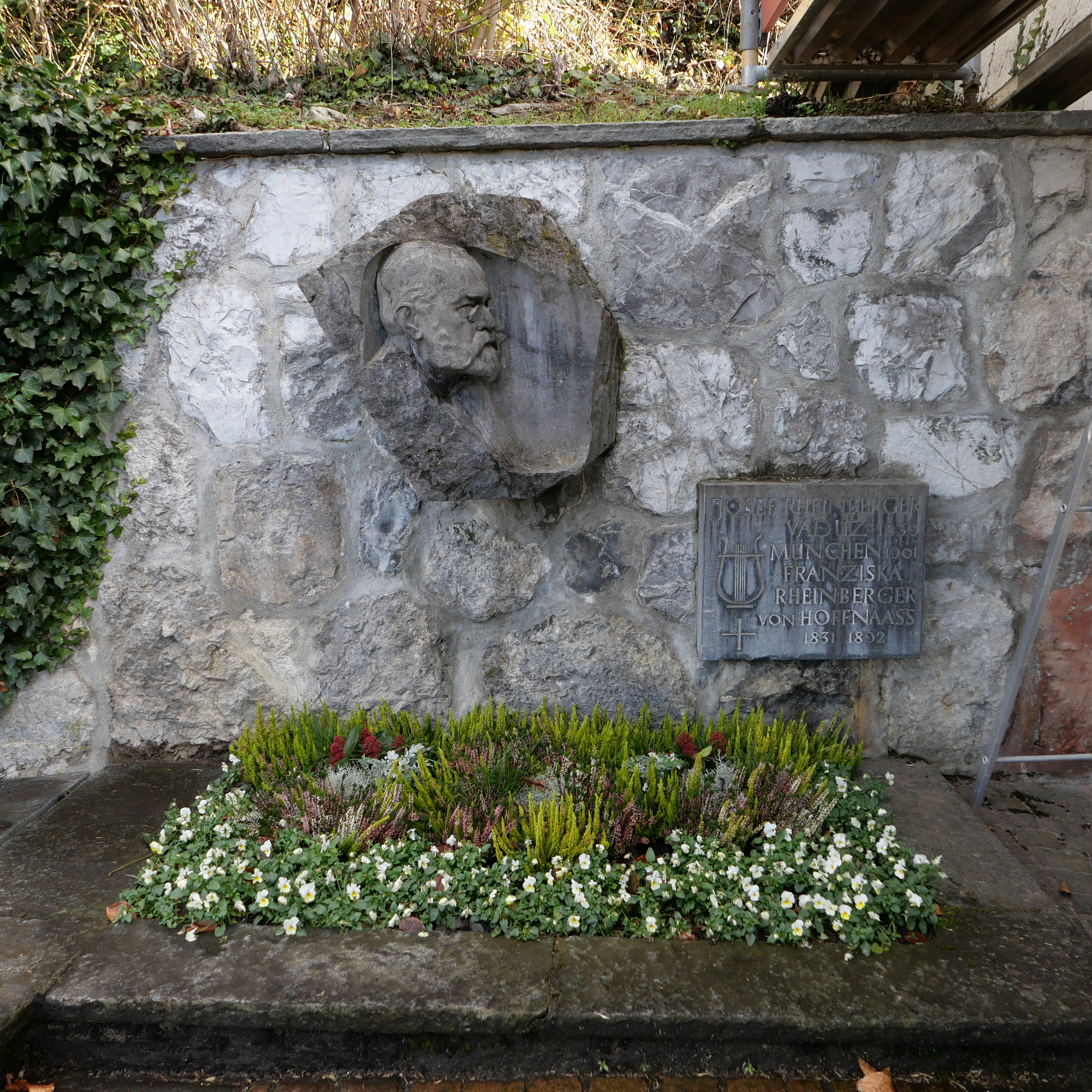
The grave in Vaduz.

Today Rheinberger is remembered above all for his elaborate and challenging organ compositions; these include two concertos, 20 sonatas in 20 different keys (of a projected set of 24 sonatas in all the keys), 22 trios, and 36 solo pieces. His organ sonatas were once declared to be

undoubtedly the most valuable addition to organ music since the time of Mendelssohn. They are characterized by a happy blending of the modern Romantic spirit with masterly counterpoint and dignified organ style.

— J. Weston Nicholl, Grove Dictionary of Music and Musicians (1908 edition), v. 4, 85

Rheinberger died in 1901 in Munich, and was buried in the Alter Südfriedhof. His grave was destroyed during World War II, and his remains as well as those of his wife were moved to his home town of Vaduz in 1950.

== Compositions ==
Theme and Variations for Organ: Theme

Theme and Variations for Organ: Variation 1

Theme and Variations for Organ: Variation 2

Theme and Variations for Organ: Variation 3

Theme and Variations for Organ: Variation 4

Theme and Variations for Organ: Variation 5

Theme and Variations for Organ: Variation 6

This list only mentions works that were assigned an opus number by Rheinberger himself.

- Sacred vocal works
  - Cantatas, including the Christmas cantata Der Stern von Bethlehem (The Star of Bethlehem), Op. 164
  - 14 masses, including the 1878 Cantus Missae for double choir a cappella and the 1881 Mass in A major, Op. 126, 3 requiem settings, 2 settings of the Stabat Mater
  - Motets, hymns, lieder
    - among others, Abendlied (Op. 69, Nr. 3) after Luke 24,29 ("Bleib bei uns")
- Dramatic works
  - 2 operas (Die sieben Raben, Op. 20, after the Grimm fairy tale The Seven Ravens, Türmers Töchterlein, Op. 70)
  - 3 Singspiele
  - 2 pieces of incidental music
- Secular choral music
  - Choir ballads
  - Choral pieces with and without accompaniment
  - Works for mixed choir
    - e.g., Waldblumen (Op. 124) – eight songs after texts by Franz Alfred Muth
  - Works for female and male choirs
- 12 lieder for Voice and Piano
- Orchestral music
  - 5 symphonies:
    - Symphony No. 1 in D major, Op. 22 (1855)
    - Symphony No. 2 in C minor (1856)
    - Symphony No. 3 in C major (1857)
    - Wallenstein, Symphonic picture in four movements, in D minor, Op. 10 (1865)
    - Florentine Symphony in F major, Op. 87 (1875)
  - 3 overtures
  - 2 Piano concertos:
    - Piano concerto in E♭ major (1860; orchestrated by Jürg Hanselmann 2008)
    - Piano concerto in A♭, Op. 94 (1877)
  - 3 other concertos for instruments with orchestra (including two concertos for organ and orchestra)
- Chamber music
  - String quartets, string quintets, piano trios, sonatas for solo instruments and piano
    - e.g., Clarinet Sonata, Op. 105 in A major
  - 4 piano sonatas
- Works for organ
  - 2 organ concertos
  - 20 organ sonatas
  - 12 Fughettas, Op. 123
  - 12 Monologues, Op. 162
  - 12 Meditations, Op. 167
  - Preludes, trios, character pieces
  - Works for solo instruments (violin and oboe) with organ

== Recordings ==
- Rheinberger: Missae et Cantiones, Wolfgang Schäfer Choir Director, Edgar Krapp Organ, Klaus Mertens Baritone, Frankfurter Kantorei, Carus-Verlag 1998
- Rheinberger: Organ Sonatas Nos. 2, 3, 4, 5, 6, 8, 11, 12, 16, 17, 19, 20: Bruce Stevens, organ; Raven Recordings; 4 CDs
- Josef Gabriel Rheinberger: Motets, Masses and Hymns, Elizabeth Patterson, Director; Gloriae Dei Cantores; Paraclete Recordings 2011
- Rheinberger: Geistliche Vokalmusik, Stuttgart Chamber Choir; Carus; 10 CDs
- Rheinberger: Klavierwerke, Jürg Hanselmann; Carus; 10 CDs; 2011
- The Complete Organ Sonatas of Josef Rheinberger – Roger Sayer plays The Organ of The Temple Church, London, Roger Sayer organ; Priory Records; 6 CDs; 2018
- Rheinberger: Music for Voice and Organ, Patrick Parker, organ, Katie Pollorena, mezzo-soprano, Seven Eight Records, 2019.
- Rheinberger: Sacred Choral Works, Phoenix Bach Choir, Kansas City Chorale, Charles Bruffy, conductor; Chandos Records, 2007.
- Rheinberger: Concerto No. 1 in F Major for Organ and Orchestra, Op. 137, Michael Murry, Royal Philharmonic Orchestra conducted by Jahja Ling; Telarc CD-80136, 1987

== Other sources ==
- This article incorporates text from a publication that prior to 1923, is in the public domain: "Rheinberger, Josef Gabriel, 1839–1901", The Etude, Philadelphia: Theodore Presser Company
