= Arthur Furer =

Swiss composer

Arthur Furer (28 March 1924 – 8 November 2013) was a Swiss musician and composer.

== Life ==
Born in Worb, Furer studied at the University of Bern and was solo violist in the Berner Kammerorchester and violinist in the Bern Symphony Orchestra and among others in the chamber ensemble of Radio Bern. From 1952 to 1988, he was music teacher at the Municipal Seminar Marzili and directed choirs. In 1955, he was rewarded at the 6th G. B. Viotti "Concorso Internazionale di Musica". In 1966, he was awarded the Pro-Arte Foundation Prize for his own composition, and in 1984 he was awarded the Music Prize of the Canton of Bern. In his own words, he was “not associated with a contemporary school".

Furer died in Bern at the age of 89.
