= Michael Castro (poet) =

American poet

Michael Castro (1945–2018) was a poet and translator. In 2015 Castro was named the first Poet Laureate of St. Louis. He was a founder of the literary journal River Styx.

== Early life ==
Castro was born in 1945 in New York to Greek Jewish parents before moving to St. Louis to attend Washington University.

== Career ==
Castro established the journal River Styx in 1975. He worked with Gabor G. Gyukics in translating poems from Hungarian to English. Castro taught at University of Missouri–St. Louis, and then Lindenwood University until his retirement to professor emeritus in 2012. In 2015, he was appointed the Poet Laureate of St. Louis. As part of his laureateship, he organized an art collective, Unity Community.
