= Sándor Veress =

Swiss composer (1907–1992)

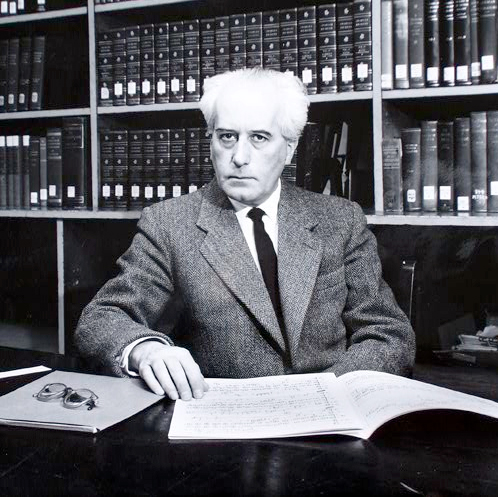
- Sándor Veress
- Born: 1 February 1907; Cluj-Napoca, Romania
- Died: 4 March 1992; Bern, Switzerland
- Education: Franz Liszt Academy of Music
- Occupation: Composer

Sándor Veress (Hungarian pronunciation: [ˈʃaːndor ˈvɛrɛʃ], 1 February 1907 – 4 March 1992) was a Swiss composer of Hungarian origin. He was born in Kolozsvár/Klausenburg, Transylvania, Kingdom of Hungary, Austro-Hungarian Empire, nowadays called Cluj-Napoca, Romania, and died in Bern. The first half of his life was spent in Hungary; the second, from 1949 until his death, in Switzerland, of which he became a citizen in the last months of his life.

Veress studied and later taught at the Franz Liszt Academy in Budapest. Among his teachers were Zoltán Kodály, with whom he studied composition, and Béla Bartók, with whom he studied piano; as an assistant to László Lajtha he did field research on Hungarian, Transylvanian, and Moldavian folk music. Among the composers who studied under him are György Ligeti, György Kurtág, Heinz Holliger, Heinz Marti, Jürg Wyttenbach and Roland Moser. He wrote numerous chamber music pieces and symphonic works. He wrote one opera, Hangjegyek lázadása (1931). Veress was awarded the Kossuth Prize in 1949 in Hungary (though as an émigré he was unable to collect this award) and the Bartók-Pásztory Prize in 1985; in Switzerland he received the Berne canton prize in 1976.

== Selected works ==
Opera

- Hangjegyek lázadása (1931)

Ballet

- A Csodafurulya (The Magic Flute) (1937)
- Térszili Katicza (1943)

Orchestral

- A Csodafurulya (The Magic Flute), Ballet Suite for chamber orchestra (1937)
- Musica ungaresca (1938)
- Sinfonia No.1 (1940) (dedicated to the Japanese emperor and government for the 2600th National Foundation Day)
- Quattro Danze transilvane for string orchestra (1944, 1949)
- Threnos in memoriam Béla Bartók (1945)
- Respublica nyitány (Respublica Overture) (1948)
- Sonata for orchestra (1953)
- Sinfonia No.2 "Minneapolitana" (1953)
- Expovare for flute, oboe and string orchestra (1964)
- Musica concertante per 12 archi, for 12 strings (1966)
- Orbis tonorum for chamber orchestra (1986)

Concertante

- Concerto for violin and orchestra (1939, 1948)
- Nógrádi verbunkos for violin and orchestra (1940)
- Hommage à Paul Klee for 2 pianos and string orchestra (1951)
- Concerto for piano with percussion and string orchestra (1952)
- Nógrádi verbunkos for viola and string orchestra (1940, 1956); arrangement by D. Marton
- Passacaglia concertante for oboe and string orchestra (1961)(dedicated to Heinz Holliger)
- Concerto for string quartet and orchestra (1961)
- Concerto for clarinet with harp, celesta, vibraphone, xylophone, percussion and string orchestra (1982)
- Tromboniade for 2 trombones and orchestra (1990)
- Concertotilinkó for flute and string orchestra (1991)

Chamber and instrumental

- String Quartet No.1 (1931)
- Sonatina No.1 for violin and piano (1932)
- Sonatina for cello and piano (1933)
- Sonatina for oboe, clarinet and bassoon (1933)
- Sonata for violin solo (1935)
- String Quartet No.2 (1937)
- Sonata No.2 for violin and piano (1939)
- Nógrádi verbunkos for violin and piano (1940)
- Cukaszöke csárdás for violin and piano (1940)
- String Trio (1954)
- Tre quadri for violin, cello and piano (1963)
- Sonata for cello solo (1967)
- Diptych for flute, oboe, clarinet, horn and bassoon (1968)
- Introduzione e Coda for clarinet, violin and cello (1972)
- Memento for viola and double bass (1983)
- Baryton-Trio for baryton, viola and cello (1985)
- Geschichten und Märchen for 2 percussionists (1988)

Piano

- Sonata (1929)
- Szonatina gyermekeknek I (Sonatina for Children I) (1932)
- Szonatina gyermekeknek II (Sonatina for Children II) (1932)
- Sonatina (1932)
- Szonatina kezdő zongorázóknak (Sonatina for Young Pianists) (1933)
- Tizenöt kis zongoradarab (15 Little Piano Pieces) (1935)
- Venti Pezzi (20 Pieces) (1938)
- 6 Csárdás (1938)
- 7 Danze ungheresi (1938)
- Billegetőmuzsika (Fingerlarks), 88 Exercises (1946)
- Homage to Wales, 3 Short Pieces based on Welsh folk melodies (1948)
- Cinque Pezzi (5 Pieces) (c.1950)

Vocal

- Canti Ceremissi, 9 Folk Song Arrangements for mezzo-soprano and piano (1945)
- Cinque Canti (5 Songs) for mezzo-soprano and piano (1945); poems by Attila József
- Elegie for baritone, harp and string orchestra (1964); poem by Walther von der Vogelweide

Choral

- Orbán for male chorus (1924); poem by Sándor Petőfi
- Gyermekkar és három kánon for children's chorus (1929)
- Karácsonyi kantáta (Christmas Cantata) for female chorus (1934)
- Tizennégy férfikar magyar népi dallamokra (14 Male Choruses on Hungarian Folk Tunes) for male chorus (1934)
- Erdélyi kantáta (Una Cantata transilvana), 4 Folk Song Arrangements for mixed chorus a cappella (1935)
- Két virágének (2 Flower Songs) for male chorus (1936)
- Tizenöt gyermekkar (15 Children's Choruses) (1936)
- Betlehemi kántáló (Christmas Chant) for female chorus (1937)
- A búbánat keserüség (Sorrow Makes You Truly Bitter) for male chorus (1938)
- Rabaközi nóták (Songs from Rábaköz) for male chorus (1940)
- Sancti Augustini psalmus contra partem Donati for bass solo, mixed chorus and orchestra (1944); poem by Augustinus
- Laudatio musicae for soprano, chorus and chamber orchestra (1958); poem by Valentin Rathgeber
- Ode all'Europa for mixed chorus a cappella (1962); poem by Gyula Illyés
- Songs of the Seasons for mixed chorus a cappella (1967); poems by Christopher Brennan
- Das Glasklängespiel for soloists and chamber orchestra (1978); poems by Hermann Hesse

Film score

- Talpalatnyi föld (The Soil under Your Feet) (1948)
