= List of compositions for viola: F to H =

This article lists compositions written for the viola. The list includes works in which the viola is a featured instrument: viola solo, viola and piano, viola and orchestra, ensemble of violas, etc. Catalogue number, date of composition and publisher (for copyrighted works) are also included. Ordering is by composer surname.

This pages lists composers whose surname falls into the F to H alphabetic range. For others, see respective pages:

- List of compositions for viola: A to B
- List of compositions for viola: C to E
- List of compositions for viola: I to K
- List of compositions for viola: L to N
- List of compositions for viola: O to R
- List of compositions for viola: S
- List of compositions for viola: T to Z

== F ==
- Brendan Faegre (b. 1985)

4 Koans for violin and viola (2011); Raven Feather Music

- Rolande Falcinelli (1920–2006)

Canzon per sonar for 2 violas and organ, Op. 57 (1975)
Récurrence for viola and piano, Op. 70 (1986); Collection Panorama: Œuvres Contemporaines, Volume 2 (1987); Éditions Gérard Billaudot
Sine nomine for viola and piano, Op. 71 (1987); Symétrie
Tétrade for viola and organ, Op. 60 (1976)

- David Fanshawe (1942–2010)

The Awakening, Intermezzo for cello or viola and piano (1981); Oxford University Press

- Harry Farjeon (1878–1948)

2 Morceaux (2 Pieces) for viola and piano (1911)

- Ferenc Farkas (1905–2000)

Ahogy tetszik (As You Like It), Suite in Old Style for violin, viola and harp (1939, revised 1969); based on the incidental music for the play by William Shakespeare
All'antica for viola and harpsichord or piano (1962); original for baryton and harpsichord; Editio Musica Budapest
Arioso for viola and piano (1926); Zeneműkiadó Vállalat; Editio Musica Budapest
Bihari román táncok (Rumanian Folk Dances from Bihar) for viola and piano (1950); Editio Musica Budapest
Eclogue for viola and guitar
Három táncparafrázis (Three Dance Paraphrases) for flute, viola and horn (1972); Editio Musica Budapest
Meditazione for flute, viola and piano (1990); Ascolta
Sonata a due for viola and cello (1961); Zeneműkiadó Vállalat; Editio Musica Budapest
Tiz tanulmány (Ten Studies) for violin and viola (1997); Editio Musica Budapest

- Gareth Farr (b. 1968)

Meditation for viola and piano (1996); Promethean Editions
The Seventh Age for viola, sheng and Balinese gamelan (2009)

- Eibhlis Farrell (b. 1953)

Elegy for viola and piano (1977); Ireland Contemporary Music Centre
Penelope Weaving for viola solo (1994); Ireland Contemporary Music Centre

- Bruce Faulconer (b. 1951)

Fantasia for viola solo (1980)
Fantasia No. 2 for viola solo (1990)

- Hélène-Frédérique de Faye-Jozin (1871–1942)

Concertstück for viola and piano (1932); Éditions Louis Rouhier

- Alfio Fazio (b. 1959)

In limine for viola solo (1992)

- Ivan Fedele (b. 1953)

Concerto for viola and orchestra (1990, revised 1995); Edizioni Suvini Zerboni
Elettra for viola and live electronics (1999); Edizioni Suvini Zerboni
L'Orizzonte di Elettra for viola, chamber orchestra and live electronics (1997); Edizioni Suvini Zerboni
Paroles..., 2 Pezzi (2 Pieces) for female voice and viola (2000); Edizioni Suvini Zerboni
Ritrovari, Suite francese VI for viola solo (2011); Edizioni Suvini Zerboni

- Jindřich Feld (1925–2007)

Concerto for viola and orchestra (2003–2004); Český Hudební Fond
Duo for violin and cello (or viola) (1989); Český Hudební Fond
Koncertantní hudba (Concertante Music) for viola and piano (1983); Editio Bärenreiter Praha
Malá sonatina (Little Sonatina) for viola and piano (1974); Editio Bärenreiter Praha
Musique concertante for flute, viola, harp and string orchestra (2005); Český Hudební Fond
Sonata for viola and piano (1955); Editio Bärenreiter Praha

- Morton Feldman (1926–1987)

Rothko Chapel for viola, percussion, celesta, soprano, alto and chorus (1971); written for performance at Rothko Chapel; Universal Edition
The Viola in My Life I for viola, flute, violin, cello, piano and percussion (1970); Universal Edition
The Viola in My Life II for viola, flute, clarinet, violin, cello, celesta and percussion (1970); Universal Edition
The Viola in My Life III for viola and piano (1970); Universal Edition
The Viola in My Life IV for viola and orchestra (1971); Universal Edition

- Daniel Felsenfeld (b. 1970)

Hooked to the Silver Screen for viola solo (2011)

- Philippe Fénelon (b. 1952)

Caprice for viola solo (1977, revised 1982); Éditions Amphion; United Music Publishers
Epha for bassoon and viola (2000)
Fragment II for basset horn and viola (2002)
Nit for viola solo (1994); Éditions Amphion; United Music Publishers

- Vladimir Fere (1902–1971)

Sonata for flute and viola
Sonata for viola and piano, Op. 10 (1927)
Suite (Сюита) for viola solo, Op. 9 (1927)

- Howard Ferguson (1908–1999)

Five Irish Folk Tunes for viola or cello and piano (1927, revised 1988); Oxford University Press
Four Short Pieces for viola and piano, Op. 6 (1932–1936); Boosey & Hawkes

- Armando José Fernandes (1906–1983)

Sonatina for viola and piano (1945); AvA Musical Editions

- Gabriel Fernández Álvez (1943–2008)

Oda (Ode) for viola and piano (1984)

- Brian Ferneyhough (b. 1943)

Incipits for viola, obbligato percussion and six instruments (1996); Edition Peters

- John Fernström (1897–1961)

Concerto for viola and orchestra, Op. 34 (1937); STIM; Swedish Music Information Centre
Romans ciss-moll (Romance in C♯ Minor) for viola and orchestra; STIM; Swedish Music Information Centre

- Andrea Ferrante (b. 1968)

Filtrò poi una luce for viola and piano (2010)
Il fiore d'inverno for viola and harp (2010)
Il petalo blu for flute, viola and harp (2010)
L'orizzonte e oltre for viola and string orchestra (2011)

- Giorgio Ferrari (1925–2010)

Divertimento for viola d'amore and viola
Improvvisazione for viola solo (1979); Boccaccini & Spada Editions
Memorie for viola and orchestra (1975); Casa Musicale Sonzogno
Sonata for viola and piano (1973); G. Zanibon

- Luc Ferrari (1929–2005)

Didascalies for viola, piano and memorized mound on media (2004); Brunhild Ferrari
Rencontres Fortuites for viola, piano and memorized mound on media (2003); Brunhild Ferrari

- Lorenzo Ferrero (b. 1951)

Sonata for viola and piano (2000)

- Claude Ferrier (b. 1963)

Cinq-chronique for flute, viola and harp (1994–1995)

- John Ferritto (1937–2010)

Abstractions, Duo for viola and piano, Op. 39 (2001); American Composers Alliance
Canzone for viola solo, Op. 8 (1968); American Composers Alliance
Duo Toccata for viola and cello, Op. 24 (1990); American Composers Alliance
Fantasy Duo for viola and piano, Op. 20 (1984); American Composers Alliance
Movement for viola and percussion orchestra, Op. 22 (1989); American Composers Alliance
Quattro Diversioni for clarinet, viola and piano, Op. 3 (1966); American Composers Alliance
Sogni for soprano, viola (offstage) and orchestra, Op. 12 (1972); American Composers Alliance
Violette for 2 violas, Op. 40 (2001); American Composers Alliance
Violin and Viola Duo, Op. 35 (2000); American Composers Alliance

- Josef Fiala (1748–1816)

Adagio and 10 Variations for oboe and viola; Doblinger

- Jacobo Ficher (1896–1978)

Sonata for flute, viola and piano, Op. 18 (1931)
Sonata for viola and piano, Op. 80 (1953); Editorial Argentina de Musica
Tres piezas (3 Pieces) for viola and piano, Op. 76 (1953)

- Juraj Filas (1955–2021)

Sonata No. 1 for viola and piano (1978); Schott Music Panton
Sonata No. 2 "In memoriam" for viola and piano (1988); Český Hudební Fond; Editions Bim
Sonata for viola and organ (1979); Český Hudební Fond

- Anton Fils (Filtz) (1733–1760)

Concerto in D major for viola and orchestra

- Elaine Fine (b. 1959)

Canzona for viola and harp (2002); Seesaw Music
Crepuscule, Interlude and Dance for flute, violin and viola (2006); Seesaw Music
Evening Music for 2 violins and viola (2002); Seesaw Music
Germaine for oboe, viola and harp (2001)
The Happy Family for narrator, viola, bass clarinet and piano (2005); after the story by Hans Christian Andersen; Seesaw Music
Luxury Suite for viola (or cello) and piano (2005); Seesaw Music
New Year's Greeting for 2 violas (2012)
Partly Sunny for violin and viola (2005)
Skye Boat Fantasie for violin, viola and piano (2009)
Sonata for viola and piano (2003); Seesaw Music
Tango Mariposa for viola and piano (2002); Seesaw Music
Trio for violin, viola and piano (2012)
Two Pieces for viola and piano (2008)
The Ugly Duckling for bass clarinet, viola and string orchestra (2005); after the story by Hans Christian Andersen; Seesaw Music
Under the Apricot Tree for countertenor (or mezzo-soprano), bass flute, and viola (2001); Seesaw Music

- Vivian Fine (1913–2000)

Duo for flute and viola (1961); C. Fischer
Lieder for viola and piano (1979); Sisra Publications; Arsis Press
The Song of Persephone for solo viola (1964); Catamount Facsimile Edition

- Fidelio Finke (1891–1968)

8 Musiken for 2 violins and viola (1923); Verlag Neue Musik
Sonata for viola and piano (1954); Breitkopf & Härtel

- Ross Lee Finney (1906–1997)

Sonata [No. 1] in A minor for viola and piano (1937, revised 1950); C.F. Peters
Sonata No. 2 for viola and piano (1953, revised 1955); C.F. Peters

- Michael Finnissy (b. 1946)

Obrecht Motetten III for solo viola or solo viola with chamber ensemble (1989); Oxford University Press
Untitled Piece in Memory of Igor Stravinsky for flute, viola and harp (1971); also for flute solo; Tre Media Musikverlage

- Graciane Finzi (b. 1945)

Ainsi la Vie for viola solo (1991); Éditions Durand; United Music Publishers
Concerto for viola and orchestra
Impression Tango for viola and piano (or accordion) (2005); Éditions Gérard Billaudot; United Music Publishers
Les chiens qui rêvent dans la nuit (The Dogs That Dream in the Night), Trio for flute, viola and harp (1982)
Osmose for viola and guitar (2001); Éditions Hapax

- Ertuğrul Oğuz Fırat (1923–2014)

Bağımsız Çığırgılar Ardışı (Les Chansons Independant-Suite), Trio No. 5 for clarinet, viola and piano, Op. 75 (1963, 1985); adapted from Bağımsız Şarkılar (Independent Songs), Op. 18 (1963)
Concerto No. 1 Kaynak Sonunu Bekliyordu for viola and orchestra, Op. 28 (1967, revised 1975)
Concerto No. 2 Kanıtsız Günlerin Oldusu (A Vision of Days Past) for viola and orchestra, Op. 35 (1968); Seesaw Music
Küçük Parçalar (Short Pieces) for viola and piano, Op. 12 (1956–1958)
Sonatçık (Petite Sonata) for viola and piano, Op. 11 (1957–1958)

- Elena Firsova (b. 1950)

Meditation in the Japanese Garden for flute, viola and piano, Op. 54 (1992); Meladina Press
Suite for viola solo, Op. 2 (1967); Meladina Press; Hans Sikorski

- Nenad Firšt (b. 1964)

Love Song for 2 violas (1988); Društvo Slovenskih Skladateljev
SSSSS, Variations for viola and double bass (1991); Društvo Slovenskih Skladateljev
Tres Faciunt Collegium for clarinet, viola and piano (2001); Društvo Slovenskih Skladateljev

- Georgy Firtich (1938–2016)

Sonata-Fantasy (Соната-Фантазия) in A minor for viola and piano (1986); Sovetsky Kompozitor; Kompozitor

- Luboš Fišer (1935–1999)

Sonata for solo viola and string quartet (1991); Český Hudební Fond
Zapomenuté písně (Forgotten Songs) for mezzo-soprano, alto flute, viola and piano (1985); Český Hudební Fond

- Adrian Vernon Fish (b. 1956)

Elegy for viola solo (1984)
Polly's Moods: Epigrams for a Mime for viola solo (1992)
Sonata "Qaanaaq" for viola and piano (2000)
Uyeasound Nocturne for viola and piano (1989)

- Jerzy Fitelberg (1903–1951)

Serenada for viola and piano (1943); Southern Music

- William Flackton (1709–1798)

Sonata in C major for viola and harpsichord, Op. 2 No. 4
Sonata in D major for viola and harpsichord, Op. 2 No. 5
Sonata in G major for viola and harpsichord, Op. 2 No. 6
Sonata in C minor for viola and harpsichord, Op. 2 No. 8

- Robert Fleming (1921–1976)

Berceuse for violin, or viola, or cello and piano (1962); Canadian Music Centre

- Hélène Fleury-Roy (1876–1957)

Fantaisie in E minor for viola (or violin) and piano, Op. 18 (1906)

- Marius Flothuis (1914–2001)

Elegia for viola solo, Op. 81 No. 2 (1981); No. 2 from Frivolités, Drie stukken voor strijkinstrumenten (Frivolités, 3

- George Flynn (b. 1937)

Duo for viola and piano (1974, 1985, 1995); Imprimis Music

- John Fodi (1944–2009)

Against Black Woods, Long Streaks of Rain for viola solo, Op. 88 (1998); Canadian Music Centre
Badineries, 3 Pieces for viola and piano, Op. 99 No. 1 (2008); Canadian Music Centre
Concerto for viola and 2 wind ensembles, Op. 35 (1972); Canadian Music Centre
Divisions III for viola solo, Op. 34 (1971); Canadian Music Centre
Iz Ist in Der Werlt Wol Schin for high voice and viola (1975); Canadian Music Centre
Trio for flute, viola and harpsichord (1977); Canadian Music Centre
Variations III for viola and percussion, Op. 52 (1978); Canadian Music Centre

- Carel Anton Fodor (1768–1846)

Thème et sept variations (Theme and 7 Variations) for viola with violin accompaniment

- Josef Bohuslav Foerster (1859–1951)

Dvě písně s violou a klavírem (2 Songs with Viola and Piano), Op. 91 (1912); Hudební matice Umělecké besedy
Zbirožská Suita (Zbiroh Suite) for viola and piano, Op. 167 (1940); Hudební matice Umělecké besedy

- Eloy Fominaya (1925–2002)

Concerto for viola and orchestra (1963)

- Bjørn Fongaard (1919–1980)

Concerto for viola and orchestra, Op. 119 No. 8 (1977); Music Information Centre Norway
Concerto for viola and tape, Op. 131 No. 18 (1976); Music Information Centre Norway
Duo for viola and cello, Op. 127 No. 16 (1974); Music Information Centre Norway
Duo for violin and viola, Op. 127 No. 12 (1974); Music Information Centre Norway
Sonata No. 1 for viola solo, Op. 125 No. 43 (1973); Music Information Centre Norway
Sonata No. 2 for viola solo, Op. 125 No. 44 (1973); Music Information Centre Norway
Sonata No. 3 for viola solo, Op. 125 No. 45 (1973); Music Information Centre Norway
Sonatina for viola and piano, Op. 126 No. 28 (1974); Music Information Centre Norway
Trio for flute, viola and harp (1971); Music Information Centre Norway

- Jacqueline Fontyn (b. 1930)

Fougères (Ferns) for viola and harp or piano (1981); CeBeDeM

- Arthur Foote (1853–1937)

Sarabande and Rigaudon for oboe, viola and piano

- Sebastian Forbes (b. 1941)

Crete Songs for baritone (or mezzo-soprano), viola and piano (1966); International Music Company
St Andrews Solo for viola solo (2009)
Viola Fantasy for viola solo (1979); British Music Information Centre

- Andrew Ford (b. 1957)

Chorales from an Ox Life for viola and double bass (2007); Australian Music Centre
The Very End of Harvest for viola and piano (2000); Australian Music Centre
Swansong for viola solo (1987); Australian Music Centre
The Unquiet Grave for solo viola and chamber orchestra (1997–1998); Australian Music Centre
You Must Sleep, but I Must Dance for viola and percussion (2010)

- Cecil Forsyth (1870–1941)

Chanson celtique in D minor for viola and piano or orchestra (1905); Edition Schott
Concerto in G minor for viola and orchestra (1903); Edition Schott
The Dark Road for viola and string orchestra (1922); H. W. Gray; American Viola Society Publications

- Malcolm Forsyth (1936–2011)

The Dong with a Luminous Nose for mezzo-soprano, viola and piano (1979); Counterpoint Music Library Services; Canadian Music Centre
Double Concerto for viola, cello and orchestra (2004); Counterpoint Music Library Services
Intimacies for flute, viola and guitar (1977) or for flute, viola and harp (2000); Counterpoint Music Library Services; Canadian Music Centre
In Perfect Harmony for viola, cello and piano (2004); Counterpoint Music Library Services
Steps for viola and piano (1978); Counterpoint Music Library Services; Canadian Music Centre

- Wolfgang Fortner (1907–1987)

Aria for viola solo
Concertino in G minor for viola and chamber orchestra (1934); Edition Schott; Associated Music Publishers
Solostück for viola solo (1979)

- Lukas Foss (1922–2009)

Orpheus for viola (or cello, or violin) and chamber orchestra (1973); Éditions Salabert

- Kalitha Dorothy Fox (1894–1934)

Sonata in C minor for viola and piano, Op. 7 (c.1925); Éditions Maurice Senart

- Jean Françaix (1912–1997)

Divertissement for violin, viola and cello soli with orchestra (1935) or with piano (1974); Schott Music
Rhapsodie for viola and piano (1946, 1993); also for viola and small orchestra (1946); Edition Schott
Trio for clarinet, viola and piano (1990); Edition Schott

- Luca Francesconi (b. 1956)

Animus II for viola and electronics (2007)
Charlie Chan for viola solo (1991)
Piccola trama for saxophone (or viola) and 8 instruments (1989)

- Maurice Franck (1897–1983)

Suite for viola and orchestra (1965); Éditions Musicales Transatlantiques
Thème et variations for viola and orchestra (1957); Éditions Durand

- Gabriela Lena Frank (b. 1972)

Cinco Danzas de Chambi for viola and piano (2006); G. Schirmer
La Llorona, Tone Poem for viola and orchestra (2007); G. Schirmer

- Benjamin Frankel (1906–1973)

Sonata for viola solo, Op. 7 (early 1930s)
Concerto for viola and orchestra, Op. 45 (1967); Novello & Co.

- Wim Franken (1922–2012)

Sonata for viola solo (1948); Donemus

- Isadore Freed (1900–1960)

Rhapsody for viola and orchestra (1945); Carl Fischer
Shepherd's Holiday for voice, viola and piano
Suite for viola and piano
Trio for flute, viola and harp (1940); Transcontinental Music Publications

- Jan Freidlin (b. 1944)

Music of the Passing Summer for flute, viola and harp (1996)
Night Seine Blues for viola and piano; Musik Fabrik
Tenderness for viola and harp (or guitar, or piano); Musik Fabrik

- Don Freund (b. 1947)

Concerto (in One Movement) for viola and orchestra (1995); MMB Music
Crossings for viola and guitar (1976); MMB Music
Fanfare for Violas for 8 to 24 violas (1995)
SeeNoHearNoSpeakNo for 3 dancers, viola, double bass and percussion (pots and pans) (2011)
Seven Etudes à Due for viola and cello (1973); Seesaw Music
Songs Without Words, 3 Pieces for viola and piano (2011)
Three Bagatelles for viola and piano (1968)

- Emil Frey (1889–1946)

3 Pièces for viola and piano, Op. 79 (1936)

- Jürg Frey (b. 1953)

Mit Schweigen wird's gesprochen II for viola solo (1993, 1995); Timescraper Music
(Unbetitelt) IV (Untitled IV) for viola and piano (1990); Timescraper Music
Viola, Klavier (Viola, Piano) for viola and piano (1997); Timescraper Music
Wen 21 for viola solo (2000); Timescraper Music
Wen 29 for viola solo (2003); Timescraper Music

- Peter Fribbins (b. 1969)

2 Fantasias for viola and piano (2007–2011)

- Peter Racine Fricker (1920–1990)

Concerto for viola and orchestra, Op. 18 (Op. 20) (1952); Schott Music
Fantasy for viola and piano, Op. 44 (1966); American Viola Society Publications
Three Movements for viola solo, Op. 25 (1955)

- Géza Frid (1904–1989)

Concerto for viola, string orchestra and bass drum, Op. 108 (1985); Donemus
Sonatina for viola and piano, Op. 25 (1946); Donemus
Vice Versa II for viola and piano, Op. 96 (1982); Donemus

- Grigory Frid (1915–2012)

Concerto for viola and chamber orchestra, Op. 52 (1967); Hans Sikorski
Concerto for viola, piano and string orchestra, Op. 73 (1981); Sovetsky Kompozitor; Schirmer Russian Music; Hans Sikorski
Phèdre (Федра; Phaedra) for viola solo, 2 violins, cello and piano, Op. 78 No. 1 (1985); version for viola and piano entitled Viola Sonata No. 2; Sovetsky Kompozitor; Hans Sikorski
6 Pieces (Шесть пьес; 6 Stücke) for viola and piano, Op. 68 (1975); Hans Sikorski
Sonata [No. 1] for viola and piano, Op. 62 No. 1 (1971); Sovetsky Kompozitor; Hans Sikorski
Sonata No. 2 for viola and piano, Op. 78 No. 2 (1985); second version of Phèdre; Sovetsky Kompozitor; Hans Sikorski

- Gary William Friedman

Colloquy for viola and piano (2007)

- Witold Friemann (1889–1977)

Concerto No. 1 for viola and orchestra, Op. 175 (1952)
Concerto No. 2 in Three Parts (Koncert nr. 2 w trzech częściach) for solo viola, string orchestra, timpani and cymbals, Op. 303 (1968)
Cztery pieśni rycerskie (4 Chivalrous Songs), Suite for viola and harp (or piano) (1935)
Cztery pieśni rycerskie (4 Chivalrous Songs), Concertino for viola and harp with flute, oboe, clarinet, 2 bassoons, contra-bassoon and percussion (1970)
Myśli (Thoughts) for viola and piano (1971)
Mazurek in G minor for viola and piano (1975)
Sonata for viola and piano (1935)
Trzy utwory (3 Pieces) for viola and piano (1940–1947)

- James Friskin (1886–1967)

Elegy for viola and piano (1912); Stainer & Bell

- Johannes Fritsch (1941–2010)

Duett für Bratsche for viola and tape (1961)
Partita for viola, contact microphones, magnetophones, filters, regulators (4 players) (1965–1966); Edition Modern
Trio for viola, trombone and piano with ring modulator (1977)
Viola Duo for 2 violas (1983, 2004); original version for 2 cellos
X '88 for viola, cello and double bass (1988)

- David Froom (b. 1951)

Elegy for viola solo (2006)
Songs of a Summer Evening for violin, viola and orchestra (2004)

- Ivar Frounberg (b. 1950)

"D" for violin and viola (1986); Edition Samfundet
Epitome for viola solo (1999); Edition SUDM (Samfundet til Udgivelse af Dansk Musik)

- Gunnar de Frumerie (1908–1987)

Divertimento for clarinet (or viola) and cello, Op. 63 (1966); STIM; Swedish Music Information Centre
Duo for oboe and viola (1928); Swedish Music Information Centre
Tio variationer över en svensk folkvisa (Ten Variations on a Swedish Folk Song) for viola and guitar, Op. 69b (1977); STIM; Swedish Music Information Centre

- Kenneth Fuchs (b. 1956)

Divinum Mysterium, Concerto for viola and orchestra (2008); Edward B. Marks Music Company

- Lillian Fuchs (1901–1995)

12 Caprices for viola solo (1950); G. Schirmer
15 Characteristic Studies for viola solo (1956); Oxford University Press
16 Fantasy Etudes for viola solo (1959); International Music Company
Sonata Pastorale for viola solo (1953); Associated Music Publishers

- Robert Fuchs (1847–1927)

12 Duets for violin and viola, Op. 60 (1898)
6 Phantasiestücke (6 Fantasy Pieces) for viola and piano, Op. 117 (published 1927)
7 Phantasiestücke (7 Fantasy Pieces) for violin, viola and piano, Op. 57 (1897)
Sonata in D minor for viola and piano, Op. 86 (1909)
Terzett for 2 violins and viola, Op. 107 (1923)
2 Terzetti for 2 violins and viola, Op. 61 (1898)
Trio in F♯ minor for violin, viola and piano, Op. 115 (1920)

- Dai Fujikura (b. 1977)

Breathless for viola and toy piano (2004); G. Ricordi London
Cutting Sky for viola and koto (2006); G. Ricordi London
Dolphins (ドルフィンズ) for 2 violas (2010); Tokyo Ricordi
flux for viola solo (2007); G. Ricordi London
Prism Spectra (プリズム・スペクトラ) for viola and electronics (2009); Paris Ricordi
Still Sweet for mezzo-soprano, viola and alto flute (1998); G. Ricordi London
Still Sweet II for mezzo-soprano, viola and alto flute (1998, revised 2008); G. Ricordi London
Touch of Breeze for viola, clarinet and shō (2004); G. Ricordi London

- Anis Fuleihan (1900–1970)

Concerto for viola and orchestra (1963)
Duo for viola and cello (1971); Southern Music Publishing
Fantasy for viola and orchestra (1938)
Recitative and Sicilienne for cello (or viola) and piano (1945); Southern Music Publishing; G. Schirmer
Sonata for viola and piano
Symphonie Concertante for string quartet and orchestra (1939)

- James Fulkerson (b. 1945)

Chamber Musics VII for viola and tape (1976)
Patterns V for bass flute or viola solo (1975); Edition Modern

- Norman Fulton (1909–1980)

Introduction, Air and Reel for viola and piano, Op. 11 (1950); Oxford University Press
Sonata de Camera for viola and piano, Op. 9 (1945); Chester Music

- Raphaël Fumet (1898–1979)

Diptyque baroque for flute and viola (1958?); Editions Delatour
3 Pièces for viola and piano; Editions Delatour

1. Lacrimosa in F major
2. Barcarolle in E major
3. Andante pathétique

- Arthur Furer (1924–2013)

E chlyni Husmusig (Eine kleine Hausmusik) for violin and viola (or 2 violins) (1998); Müller & Schade
Kleine geistliche Kantate (Little Sacred Cantata) for high voice, viola obbligato and organ; Müller & Schade
Musica for viola solo (1991); Müller & Schade

- Beat Furrer (b. 1954)

a due for viola and piano (1997); Bärenreiter Verlag

- Franz Furrer-Münch (1924–2010)

Colla voce, Concerto for viola and chamber orchestra (2007–2008); Tre Media Musikverlage
Freundliche Landschaft for viola solo (2003); Tre Media Musikverlage
Instants modifiés for viola, cello and double bass (1989); Tre Media Musikverlage

- Paul Walter Fürst (1926–2013)

Bratschen-Trio for 3 violas, Op. 67 (1982); Verlag Doblinger
Concerto for 2 violas and 16 woodwinds, Op. 23 (1956); Verlag Doblinger
Concerto for viola, cello and orchestra, Op. 58 (1976); Verlag Doblinger
Duo for viola and cello, Op. 17 (1953); Verlag Doblinger
Egoton, Trio for viola, cello and double bass, Op. 68 (1982); Verlag Doblinger
Emotionen, 7 Duos for viola and double bass, Op. 57 (1976); for Viola, Double Bass and String Orchestra, Op. 57a (1980); Verlag Doblinger
Kaiserwalzer, Arrangement of Emperor Waltzes by Johann Strauss II for 12 violas, Op. 63 (1980)
Omedeto for 12 violas, Op. 54 (1974); Verlag Doblinger
Petitionen, Trio for clarinet, viola and piano, Op. 51 (1972); Verlag Doblinger
Sonata for viola and piano, Op. 33 (1962); Verlag Doblinger
Sonatina for viola and piano, Op. 13 (1952); Verlag Doblinger
Togata, Four Scenes for 2 violas, Op. 45 (1968); Verlag Doblinger
Unter Donner und Blitz, arrangement of Thunder and Lightning Polka by Johann Strauss II for 12 violas, Op. 63a (1981)
Violatüre for viola and percussion, Op. 69 (1983); Verlag Doblinger

- Anton Bernhard Fürstenau (1792–1852)

Serenade for flute, viola and guitar, Op. 10 (c.1822)
Les Charmes de Maxen, Serenade for flute, viola and guitar, Op. 86 (1831)

== G ==
- Morten Gaathaug (b. 1955)

5 Duets for violin and viola, Op. 2b (1978); Music Information Centre Norway
Norwegian Fantasy for clarinet, viola and piano, Op. 44b (1994); Music Information Centre Norway
Quasi una fantasia for viola and piano, Op. 12d (1980, 2002); Music Information Centre Norway

- Kenneth Gaburo (1926–1993)

Ideas and Transformations No. 1 for violin and viola (1954–1955); Theodore Presser Company
Ideas and Transformations No. 3 for viola and cello (1955)

- Niels Gade (1817–1890)

3 Fantasistykker (3 Fantasy Pieces) for clarinet or viola and piano, Op. 43 (1864)
Sonata in A major for viola and piano, Op. 6 (1842); adaptation of the Sonata No. 1 for violin and piano by Heinrich Dessauer

- Renaud Gagneux (1947–2018)

Concerto for viola and orchestra, Op. 51 (1997); Éditions Durand
Duo for violin and viola (1973); Éditions Durand

- Alain Gagnon (1938–2017)

Altitude maximale (Maximum Altitude) for viola and piano, Op. 44 (1999); Doberman-Yppan; Canadian Music Centre

- Wenzel Gährich (1794–1864)

Concertino in G minor for viola and orchestra, Op. 2 (1831)

- Varvara Gaigerova (1903–1944)

Suite in D minor for viola and piano, Op. 8 (published 1969); Sovietsky Kompozitor

- Hans Gál (1890–1987)

Divertimento for violin and viola, Op. 90 No. 3 (1969); N. Simrock, London; Boosey & Hawkes
Impromptu for viola and piano (1940); Edition Schott
Sonata in A major for viola and piano, Op. 101 (1941); N. Simrock, London; Boosey & Hawkes
Suite for viola and orchestra, Op. 102a (1949–1950); N. Simrock, London; Boosey & Hawkes

- Baldassare Galuppi (1706–1785)

Aria Amorosa for viola and piano; transcription by Lionel Tertis (1954); Augener

- Grigori Gamburg (1900–1967)

2 Tunes from the "Song of Songs" (2 Pieces; Два напева из «Песни Песней»; Zwei Fragmente "Aus dem Hohen Lied") for viola and piano, Op. 5 (1928); Gosudarstvennoe muzykalnoe izdatelstvo (State Music Publishing House); Universal Edition
Concerto for viola and orchestra (1943); Sovetsky Kompozitor

- Gerardo Gandini (1936–2013)

Concerto for viola and orchestra (1979)
Honeyrom for viola and piano (1973)
Oneiron for viola and piano (1978)
Trioneiron for clarinet, viola and piano (1978, 1980); Editorial Argentina de Compositores

- Antón García Abril (1933–2021)

Cantos de Ordesa (Songs of Ordesa), Concerto for viola and orchestra (2012); Bolamar Ediciones Musicales

- Orlando Jacinto García (b. 1954)

Como los colores del viento nocturno for viola and tape (with wind chimes) (2002)
Entre el anochecer y la oscuridad for viola and orchestra (1992)
Fragmentos congelados for viola and piano (1991); Kallisti Music Press
Variations on Metallic and Wooden Shades for viola and percussion (1988)
Viento nocturno for viola solo (with small percussion) (2002)

- Jules Garcin (1830–1896)

Concertino in D major for viola (or cello) and orchestra, Op. 19 (1870)

- Samuel Gardner (1891–1984)

From the Canebrake for viola and piano, Op. 5 No. 1 (1918); original for violin and piano; G. Schirmer

- Zoltán Gárdonyi (1906–1986)

Sonata No. 2 for viola and piano (1950); Edition Walhall, Magdeburg

- Michael Garrett (b. 1944)

3 Pieces for viola and piano, Op. 70 (1989); Scottish Music Centre
Suite for viola and piano, Op. 34 (1985); Scottish Music Centre

- Odette Gartenlaub (1922–2014)

Étude concertante for viola solo (1984); Éditions Gérard Billaudot; United Music Publishers

- Ulrich Gasser (b. 1950)

Bel Air for viola and piano (2005)
4 kleine Stücke (4 Little Pieces) for viola solo (1978)
Sie verstanden seine Worte nicht, Station II from Kleine Passion am Stadtberg for viola and organ (2006)
Steinstücke (Stone Pieces) for viola, piano, piano-string player and assistant (ad libitum) (1978)
Und bräche nicht aus allen seinen Rändern aus wie ein Stern for viola and piano (1981–1984)

- Crawford Gates (1921–2018)

Ballade for viola and piano, Op. 71 (1991); Pacific Publications

- Heinrich Gattermeyer (1923–2018)

Divertimento for clarinet, viola and piano, Op. 114 (1973); Verlag Doblinger
Duo for viola and double bass (1979); Verlag Doblinger
Kassation I for flute, viola and guitar (1974); Verlag Doblinger
Sechs Grotesken (6 Grotesques) for viola and piano, Op. 108 No. 1 (1971); Verlag Doblinger

- Luigi Gatti (1740–1817)

7 Sonatas for violin and viola (c.1783)
Sonata for flute and viola

- Philippe Gaubert (1879–1941)

Ballade in A major for viola and piano (1938); Éditions Max Eschig

- Éric Gaudibert (1936–2012)

A... in Wonderland for viola and ensemble (2007); Édition Musicale Suisse
Au delà (Beyond) for flute, viola and cello (2005); Édition Musicale Suisse
Chant de l'aube (Song of the Dawn) for viola solo (1993–1995); Édition Musicale Suisse
Le dit d'elle (Says Her) for viola solo (1995, 2007); original for double bass solo; Édition Musicale Suisse
Message for cello solo and viola (2000); Éditions Papillon

- Robert Gauldin (b. 1931)

Sonata serioso for viola and piano (1962); Tritone Press

- Michel-Joseph Gebauer (1763 or 1765–1812)

6 Duos for violin and viola (1782)
6 Duos for violin and viola, Op. 5 (between 1787 and 1794)

- John Maxwell Geddes (1941–2017)

Apt for viola solo (1976); Periwinkle Publications; Scottish Music Publishing
Voilà! for 12 violas (1981); Periwinkle Publications; Scottish Music Publishing

- Christian Geisler (1869–1951)

Sonata in D minor for viola and piano, Op. 10 (1920); Skandinavisk musikforlag

- Fritz Geißler (1921–1984)

Sonata for viola solo (1953); Friedrich Hofmeister Verlag
Sonata for viola and piano (1969); Edition Peters
Sonatina for viola and piano (1954); Breitkopf & Härtel
Trio for flute, viola and harp (1979)

- Steven Gellman (b. 1947)

The Bride's Reception, Symphonic Contemplation for English horn and viola soli with orchestra (1983); Canadian Music Centre
Concerto for viola and orchestra (2004); Canadian Music Centre

- Jiří Gemrot (b. 1957)

Invence (Inventions), 6 Duets for violin and viola (1984); Český Hudební Fond
Sonata No. 2 for viola and piano (1979); Český Hudební Fond
Preludia (Preludes) for viola and piano (1986)
Meditace (Meditation) for viola and organ (1986); Český Hudební Fond

- Vladimir Genin (b. 1958)

Poème (Поэма) for viola and piano (1986)
Sonata for viola and piano (1985); Sovetsky Kompozitor

- Ada Gentile (b. 1947)

Around for flute, clarinet and viola (1984); Ricordi
Criptografia for viola and chamber orchestra (1985); Ricordi
Insight for 2 violins and viola (1984); Ricordi
Perviolasola for viola solo (1987); Ricordi

- Harald Genzmer (1909–2007)

Concerto for viola and orchestra (1967); Henry Litolff's Verlag; C.F. Peters
Duettino for flute and viola (1983); Henry Litolff's Verlag; C.F. Peters
Duo for violin and viola (1996); Ries & Erler Musikverlag
Kammerkonzert (Chamber Concerto) for viola and string orchestra (1972)
Notturno for viola and string orchestra (1970); original for horn and strings; Henry Litolff's Verlag; C.F. Peters
Sonata for viola solo (1957); Henry Litolff's Verlag; C.F. Peters
Sonata No. 1 in D major for viola and piano (1940); Ries & Erler Musikverlag
Sonata No. 2 for viola and piano (1955); Edition Schott
Sonatina for viola and piano (1971); Henry Litolff's Verlag; C.F. Peters
Trio for flute, viola and harp (1947); Henry Litolff's Verlag; C.F. Peters

- René Gerber (1908–2006)

Concertino for flute, viola and piano (1936); Pizzicato Verlag Helvetia

- Steven Gerber (1948–2015)

Duo for viola and piano (1979); APNM (Association for the Promotion of New Music); Lauren Keiser Music
Elegy on the Name "Dmitri Shostakovich" for viola solo (1991); American Composers Edition; Lauren Keiser Music
Concerto for viola and orchestra (1995–1996); American Composers Edition; Lauren Keiser Music

- Roberto Gerhard (1896–1970)

Sonata for viola and piano (1948); Oxford University Press

- Georg Gerson (1790–1825)

Duetto in E♭ major for violin and viola (1809)

- Ottmar Gerster (1897–1969)

Concertino for viola and chamber orchestra, Op. 16 (c.1928); B. Filser Verlag; Edition Schott
Divertimento for violin and viola (1924); Edition Schott
Sonata No. 1 in d minor for viola and piano (1919–1922); Friedrich Hofmeister Musikverlag
Sonata No. 2 in F for viola and piano (1954–1955); Breitkopf & Härtel

- Stefano Gervasoni (b. 1962)

Concerto pour Alto for viola solo and 15 instruments (1994–1995); BMG Ricordi
Masques et Berg..., 3 Duos for violin and viola (2009); Edizioni Suvini Zerboni
Tornasole, No. 1 from Trittico Grave for viola solo (1992–1993); BMG Ricordi
Whisper Not, 3 Studies for viola and live electronics (2006); Edizioni Suvini Zerboni

- Diamandi Gheciu (1892–1980)

Cîntec şi joc (Chanson et Danse) for viola and piano (1966); Uniunea, Bucharest; Editura Muzicală

- Giorgio Federico Ghedini (1892–1965)

Concertato for flute, viola and harp (1941); Rugginenti Editore
Contrappunti for violin, viola, cello and orchestra (1962); G. Ricordi
Musica da Concerto for viola and string orchestra (1953); G. Ricordi
Pezzo Concertante for 2 violins, viola and orchestra (1931); G. Ricordi

- Emmanuel Ghent (1925–2003)

Entelechy, Concert Piece for viola and piano (1963); Oxford University Press

- Felice Giardini (1716–1796)

Duetto in B♭ major for violin and viola (c.1790); Gems Music Publications
Duetto in D major for 2 violas; original from 6 Duetti per 2 violini, Op. 13 (1767); Edition Schott
3 Duetti for viola and bassoon
Solo per alto viola "The Billiard Sonata" in F major for viola and keyboard

- Miriam Gideon (1906–1996)

Sonata for viola and piano (1957); American Composers Alliance

- Anthony Gilbert (b. 1934)

Crow Undersongs for viola solo (1979–1981); Edition Schott
Dawnfaring for viola and piano (1981–1984); Edition Schott

1. Graculina
2. Gymnorhina
3. Manorina

Duo for violin and viola (1963)
Twirlpool for flute and viola (2008)

- Peter Gilbert (b. 1975)

3 Preludes for viola solo (2001)
Si doulcement me fait Amours doloir for oboe and viola (2013)

- David Gillingham (b. 1947)

Concerto for viola, cello and orchestra (2007); C. Alan Publications

- Bernard Gilmore (1937–2013)

Duo for flute and viola (1969); Seesaw Music
Suite for viola and percussion (1985)

- Tommaso Giordani (ca.1738–1806)

Madrigal for viola and piano (1936); transcription by Vadim Borisovsky of Caro mio ben; Gosudarstvennoe muzykalnoe izdatelstvo (State Music Publishing House)
Sonata in B♭ major for viola and continuo; Schott Music

- Aurelio Giorni (1895–1938)

Sonata in D minor for cello (or viola) and piano (1925); G Schirmer

- Giovanni Mane Giornovichi (1747–1804)

Concerto [No. 1] in D major for viola and orchestra (1773); original for violin and orchestra; transcription by Jean-Baptiste Bréval; movement II attributed to Carl Stamitz

- Ruth Gipps (1921–1999)

Concerto for violin, viola and small orchestra, Op. 49 (1957)
Jane Grey, Fantasy for viola and string orchestra, Op. 15 (1940)
Lyric Fantasy for viola and piano, Op. 46 (1955); Sam Fox Publishing

- Suzanne Giraud (b. 1958)

Élaboration for viola and piano (2000); Éditions Jobert
Promenade du soir for viola and piano (1987); Collection Panorama: Œuvres Contemporaines, Volume 3; Éditions Gérard Billaudot

- Gaetano Giuffrè (1918–2018)

Concerto for viola and orchestra (1958); Ricordi
Solitude à deux, Kodályana for viola or cello and piano; Casa Musicale Sonzagno

- Peggy Glanville-Hicks (1912–1990)

Concerto Romantico for viola and chamber orchestra (1956); American Composers Alliance; C.F. Peters

- Werner Wolf Glaser (1910–2006)

Capriccio No. 2 for viola and piano (1963); STIM; Swedish Music Information Centre
Pensieri for viola solo (1981); STIM; Swedish Music Information Centre
Sonata for viola and piano (1939); STIM; Swedish Music Information Centre
Tranquillo for violin (or flute) and viola (1946); STIM; Swedish Music Information Centre

- Paul Glass (b. 1934)

Doppelwitz (Double Joke) for 2 violas (2004); Müller & Schade
Vittoria for viola solo (1970); Müller & Schade

- Stanley Glasser (1926–2018)

Four Inventions for violin and viola (1972); Piers Press

- Daniel Glaus (b. 1957)

Chessed (Tierce en taille) from Zweite Sephiroth-Symphonie for violin and viola (2003); Müller & Schade
Gottsplitter zerstreut for tenor, viola and organ (1987); words by Andreas Urweider; Müller & Schade
Sonata for viola and piano (1977)
Und Ihr werdet hören, durch den Schlaf hindurch for female voice, viola and narrator (ad libitum) (2001)

- Alexander Glazunov (1865–1936)

Elegy (Элегия) in G minor for viola and piano, Op. 44 (1893)

- Srul Irving Glick (1934–2002)

Concerto for viola and string orchestra (1981, revised 1990); Canadian Music Centre
Four Yiddish Songs for voice, viola and piano (1986) or Mixed Chorus, Viola and Piano (1988); Canadian Music Centre
Lament and Cantorial Chant for viola and string orchestra (1985); Canadian Music Centre
A Song in Yiddish: "Es davnt der zumer" (Summer Is Praying) for voice, viola and piano (1986); Canadian Music Centre
Suite Hebraique No. 4 for viola and piano (1978); Canadian Music Centre
Trio for flute, viola and harp (1988); Canadian Music Centre

- Sylvia Glickman (1932–2006)

Antigone Speaks for flute/reciter and viola (2003); Hildegard Publishing; Theodore Presser Company

- Reinhold Glière (1875–1956)

Romance, Op. 34 (1908); 1961 transcription for viola and piano by Vadim Borisovsky

- Mikhail Glinka (1804–1857)

Barcarolle (Баркарола) in G major from A Greeting to My Native Land (1847); original for piano; transcription for viola and piano by Vadim Borisovsky; Muzgiz; Declaration of Love: Album of Popular Pieces for Viola and Piano (Страстное Признание: Альбом Популярных Пьес), Muzyka
Children's Polka (Детская полька; Polka Enfantine) (1854); transcription for viola and piano by Vadim Borisovsky; Muzgiz
Mazurka (Мазурка) in C minor (1843?); transcription for viola and piano by Vadim Borisovsky; Masters Music
Nocturne: "La Séparation" (Ноктюрн "Разлука") in D minor (1839); transcription for viola and piano by Vadim Borisovsky; Masters Music
Sonata in D minor for viola and piano (1825–1828); unfinished; completed by Vadim Borisovsky
Variations on Alyabyev's Romance "The Nightingale" (Вариации на романс «Соловей» А. Алябьева) (1833); original for piano; transcription for viola and piano by Vadim Borisovsky; Muzyka

- Vinko Globokar (b. 1934)

Limites for a violinist or violist (1973); H. Litolff's Verlag
Metamorphoses Paralleles for viola, piano and live electronics (2005); Ricordi

- Gottfried Glöckner (b. 1937)

Bratschenstücke (Viola Pieces) for viola and piano (2011); Bellmann Musikverlag

- Rosemary Glyde (1948–1994)

Wei-ji, Suite for 4 violas (1993)
Whydah, Fantasia for viola solo (1993)

- Gareth Glyn (b. 1951)

In Memoriam Cruciatorum Infantum, Concert-Piece for viola, string orchestra and harp (1987)

- Radamés Gnattali (1906–1988)

Concerto for viola and string orchestra (1967)
Concerto for violin, viola, cello and piano with wind orchestra (1971)
Sonata for viola and piano (1969)

- Vladimír Godár (b. 1956)

Bagatela (Bagatelle) for flute, viola and bassoon (1971)
Barkarola (Barcarole) for viola solo, harp, harpsichord and string orchestra (1993, 2008)
Dariačangin sad (Dariachanghi's Orchard), Myth after a novel by Othar Čiladze for viola, cello and orchestra (1987)
Emmeleia for viola and piano (1994–2002)
O Crux, meditácia (O Crux, Meditation) for viola solo (1999, 2006); original for cello solo
Passacaglia for viola solo (2004, 2007); original for cello solo
Sonáta na pamäť Viktora Šklovského (Sonata in Memory of Viktor Šklovský) for cello or viola and piano (1985); Opus Bratislava
Variácie na slovenskú ľudovú pieseň (Variations on a Slovak Folk Song) for 2 violas (2006)

- Daniel Strong Godfrey (b. 1949)

Five Character Pieces for viola and piano (1976); American Composers Alliance
Serenata Ariosa for clarinet, viola and piano (1995)
Three Marian Eulogies for high voice, viola and piano (1987); American Composers Alliance
Trio for clarinet, viola and horn (1981); Margun Music

- Roger Goeb (1914–1997)

Concertant III B for viola and double wind quintet (1952); Composers Facsimile Edition; American Composers Alliance
Concertant III C for viola and piano (1952); American Composers Alliance
Imagery for viola solo; American Composers Alliance
Nuances, Duets for clarinet and viola (1986); American Composers Alliance
Sardonic: Prelude and Dance for viola and piano; American Composers Alliance
Sonata for Viola Alone (1941); American Composers Alliance

- Alexander Goehr (1932–2024)

Concerto for viola and orchestra (1996)
Double Duo for violin and 2 violas, Op. 66 (1999); Edition Schott
Duo for 2 violas (1998); Edition Schott
Endsong (Schlussgesang), 6 Pieces for viola and orchestra, Op. 61 (1996); Edition Schott
Fugue on the Notes of Psalm IV for 2 solo violins, 2 solo violas and string orchestra, Op. 38c (1977); Edition Schott
Psalm IV for soprano, alto, women's choir, viola and organ, Op. 38a (1976); Edition Schott
Romanza on the Notes of Psalm IV for 2 solo violins, 2 solo violas and string orchestra, Op. 38c (1977); Edition Schott
Sur terre, en l'air, 3 Pieces for viola and piano, Op. 64 (1997); Edition Schott

- Friedrich Goldmann (1941–2009)

5 Duos for oboe and viola (2007)
Trio in vier Sätzen (Trio in Four Movements) in for viola, cello and double bass (1986); Edition Peters

- Mikhail Goldstein (1917–1989)

20 Little Preludes (20 kleine Präludien) for viola solo (1982); Möseler Verlag
Quartet for 4 violas

- Marin Goleminov (1908–2000)

Concerto for viola and orchestra (1946, 1955); composer's adaptation of the Cello Concerto No. 1 (1946); Union of Bulgarian Composers
Little Suite (Малка сюита) for viola solo (1951); Union of Bulgarian Composers
Sonata for violin and viola (1996); Union of Bulgarian Composers

- Jani Golob (b. 1948)

Dialog (Dialogue) for flute and viola (1984)
Nostalgija (Nostalgia) for 2 violas and orchestra; Društvo Slovenskih Skladateljev
Romanca (Romance) for viola and piano (1977)

- Georg Goltermann (1824–1898)

Andante religioso for cello or viola and harmonium or piano, Op. 56
Gran Duo for cello or viola and piano, Op. 15
Gran Duo for cello or viola and piano, Op. 25
4 Morceaux de salon (4 Salon Pieces) for viola, or clarinet, or cello and piano, Op. 35
3 Morceaux caractéristiques (3 Character Pieces) for viola or cello and piano, Op. 41 (c.1864)
Sonatina in A major for viola and piano, Op. 36
Sonatina in G major for viola and piano, Op. 61

- Evgeny Golubev (1910–1988)

Concerto for viola and orchestra, Op. 47 (1961); Muzyka
Epitaphs on the Gravestone of Fyodor Dostoyevsky (Эпитафии надгробию Ф.М. Достоевского) for viola solo, Op. 82 (1982); Sovetsky Kompozitor

- Peng-Peng Gong (b. 1992)

Concerto for viola and orchestra, Op. 50 (2017); Keiser Southern Music

- Fernando González Casellas (1925–1998)

Nocturno for viola and orchestra

- Enrique Gonzalez-Medina (b. 1954)

Música para volar (Music for Flying), Fantasy for viola and piano, Op. 38 (2011)

- Arthur Murray Goodhart (1866–1941)

Sympathy for viola and piano (1923); Augener

- Geoffrey Gordon (b. 1968)

Bright White Smooth for flute, viola and harp (2005–2006)
Meditation and Allegro for viola and chamber orchestra (2010)

- Henryk Górecki (1933–2010)

Muzyczka III (Musiquette 3) for viola ensemble, Op. 25 (1967); Boosey & Hawkes

- Sandro Gorli (b. 1948)

Amnos for 2 violins and viola (1976); Edizioni Suvini Zerboni
Le vie dei Canti for viola, oboe and harp (1989); Ricordi
Rondò for viola and piano (1986); Ricordi
Super Flumina for viola, oboe and orchestra (1987); Ricordi

- Ida Gotkovsky (b. 1933)

Invocation lyrique for viola and piano (1983); Éditions Gérard Billaudot

- Denis Gougeon (b. 1951)

Six thèmes solaires: Alto-Neptune for viola and piano (1991); Canadian Music Centre

- Morton Gould (1913–1996)

Concertette for viola and band (1943); G. Schirmer
Concerto for viola and orchestra (1943); G. Schirmer

- Théodore Gouvy (1819–1898)

Sérénade vénitienne in E minor for viola and piano (1875)

- David Gow (1924–1993)

Carol for viola and piano (1968); Anglo-American Music Publishers
Concerto for viola and orchestra (1992); Piper Publications
Nocturne and Capriccio for viola and piano, Op. 31 (1952); Augener

- Hermann Grabner (1886–1969)

2 Stücke (2 Pieces) for viola and piano, Op. 4 (1908)
Hausmusik: Sonata in G minor for viola and piano, Op. 47 No. 4 (1938); Kistner & Siegel
Zweigespräch for voice, viola and organ, Op. 16 (1924); C. F. Kahnt

- Ulf Grahn (b. 1942)

Chamber Concerto for viola and 10 instruments (1975); STIM; Swedish Music Information Centre
Duo for 2 violas (1968); STIM; Swedish Music Information Centre
Tre miniatyrer (Three Miniatures) for viola and piano (1966) or viola and string orchestra (2006); STIM; Swedish Music Information Centre

- Percy Grainger (1882–1961)

Arrival Platform Humlet for viola solo (1908); Editions Schott
Foweles in the Frith, 2-Part Gymel for tenor and baritone, or tenor and viola (1910s); Bardic Edition
The Sussex Mummers' Christmas Carol for viola and piano (1905–1911)

- Enrique Granados (1867–1916)

Danzas españolas, Op. 37 (1892–1900); original for piano; transcriptions for viola and piano

No. 2 Orientale
No. 5 Andaluza
No. 6 Rondalla aragonesa

- Philip Grange (b. 1956)

Fantasy for viola solo (1981); Maecenas Music
In Spectre Search for violin and viola (1994); Maecenas Music

- Julian Grant (b. 1960)

Three Island Tales for viola and piano (2006–2007)

- Carlos Grätzer (b. 1956)

Cinq études pour quatre altos (5 Études for 4 Violas) (2003–2005)
Variacions sobre la repetición for viola and piano (1989)

- Lars Graugaard (b. 1957)

Between Two for viola and piano, Op. 14 (1984–1985); Engstrøm & Sødring Musikforlag
The Disguise Within, Concerto for viola and orchestra (1999–2000)
Encircled for clarinet, viola and piano (1988, revised 1993)
Flesh Echoes for 2 violas (1999)
Ice Tong for flute, viola and guitar (1996); Engstrøm & Sødring Musikforlag
Time Flakes for viola solo (2004)
Trio for flute, viola and harp (1989–1990)

- Johann Gottlieb Graun (1703–1771)

Concerto in C minor for violin, viola and basso continuo; Breitkopf und Härtel
Concerto in E♭ major for viola and string orchestra, GraunWV Cv:XIII:116; N. Simrock
Sonata No. 1 in B♭ major for viola and harpsichord (with cello ad libitum); Breitkopf & Härtel; Edition Schott
Sonata No. 2 in F major for viola and harpsichord (with cello ad libitum); Breitkopf & Härtel
Sonata in C minor for viola and harpsichord (with cello ad libitum); Hans Sikorski

- Christoph Graupner (1683–1760)

Concerto in D major for viola d'amore, viola and basso continuo, GWV 317
Concerto in A major for viola d'amore, viola and basso continuo, GWV 339

- Matthew Greenbaum (b. 1950)

Nod Quiet Ox for viola and piano (1994); original for oboe and piano; Tunbridge Music; Trillenium Music Company
Per Viola Sola for viola solo (2001); American Composers Alliance
Untimely Observations for viola and piano (2002); Tunbridge Music; Trillenium Music Company

- Stuart Greenbaum (b. 1966)

An Angel Bowed Backward for viola and piano (1989–1991); Australian Music Centre

- Judd Greenstein (b. 1979)

Duo 1979 for viola and Moog Prodigy (2009)
Escape for viola solo (2004); Negative Opus Publishing; Good Child Music
In Teaching Others We Teach Ourselves for solo viola and viola sextet (2012); Good Child Music
The Night Gatherers for viola and string quartet (2004); Negative Opus Publishing; Good Child Music
Summer Dances for clarinet, viola and double bass (2003); Negative Opus Publishing; Good Child Music

- Louis Gregh (1843–1915)

Chant du Bûcheron (Lumberjack Song) for viola and piano (1904)

- Čestmír Gregor (1926–2011)

Dolce vita, 3 Pieces for viola and piano (1990); Český Hudební Fond
Důvěrnosti (Confidentiality) for violin and viola (1990); Český Hudební Fond
Náklonnosti (Affection) for viola and cello (2001); Český Hudební Fond
Trio for flute, viola and bass clarinet (1959)

- Olivier Greif (1950–2000)

2 Pièces for viola and piano, Op. 85 (1977)
Na Pari Tomaï for viola and piano, Op. 95 (1977); Éditions Max Eschig
2 Pièces for viola and piano, Op. 105 (1978)
2 Pièces for viola and piano, Op. 171 (1983)
2 Pièces for viola and piano, Op. 174 (1983)

- Mark Gresham (b. 1956)

3 Essays for viola and double string orchestra (2010)

- Alexander Gretchaninov (1864–1956)

Sonata in B♭ major for clarinet or viola and piano, Op. 161 (1935–1940)

- Geoffrey Grey (b. 1934)

Sonata for viola and piano (1986)

- Deirdre Gribbin (b. 1967)

North for viola solo (1995); Ireland Contemporary Music Centre

- Alexander Griboyedov (1795–1829)

Waltz (Вальс) in D minor for viola and piano; transcription by Vadim Borisovsky (1946); Declaration of Love: Album of Popular Pieces for Viola and Piano (Страстное Признание: Альбом Популярных Пьес), Muzyka

- Galina Grigorjeva (b. 1962)

Valge prelüüd (White Prelude: Imitating Monsieur Couperin) for baroque viola (2006)

- Helen Grime (b. 1981)

Chasing Butterflies for 100 violas (or 8 violas, or 8-part ensemble) (2004); Scottish Music Centre
To See the Summer Sky for violin and viola (2009); Chester Music

- Ebbe Grims-land (1915–2015)

Bröllopsmarsch i sommartid (Wedding March in Summertime) for 2 violas (or violin and viola), double bass ad lib. (1988); STIM; Swedish Music Information Centre
Collage de un vagabundo for 2 violas (1985); STIM; Swedish Music Information Centre
Concerto-Gavotto per Otto (von Habsburg) for violin and viola (1984); STIM; Swedish Music Information Centre
Ebbe und Flut for viola solo (1997); STIM; Swedish Music Information Centre
Fantasia "Les Pyrenées" for viola or cello solo (1947); STIM; Swedish Music Information Centre
Farväl till en skogsvän (Farewell to a Forest Friend) for viola or cello solo (1995); STIM; Swedish Music Information Centre
Fem duetter i folkton (Scener från Adelsö) (Five Duets in Folktone: Scenes from Adelsö) for violin and viola (1989); STIM; Swedish Music Information Centre
Frühlings-Duett: Två damers blandade vårkänslor for violin and viola (or cello) (1991); STIM; Swedish Music Information Centre
Fünf Wiener Hörbilder for violin and viola (1989); STIM; Swedish Music Information Centre
Haltande mobil for viola or cello solo, percussion ad lib. (1987–1992); STIM; Swedish Music Information Centre
Hatten av för Dvořák (Hats Off to Dvořák) for viola solo (2002); STIM; Swedish Music Information Centre
I gråmelerad skala (In Greymixed Scale) for viola or cello solo (1999); STIM; Swedish Music Information Centre
Impromptu russo: Tonbroderi i "Vit natt" for cello or viola solo (1981); STIM; Swedish Music Information Centre
Impulsi musicali, Suite for viola solo (1985); STIM; Swedish Music Information Centre
Kontamination, Duo Suite for violin and viola (1999); STIM; Swedish Music Information Centre
Kreuz und quer for viola solo (2003); STIM; Swedish Music Information Centre
Marsch Variante ohne Generalbass for viola solo (1989); STIM; Swedish Music Information Centre
Med speleman i täten for violin and viola (1940/1995); STIM; Swedish Music Information Centre
Nio förvandlingar av ett skånskt tema (Nine Variations on a Scanian Theme) for viola solo (1992); STIM; Swedish Music Information Centre
Österut (Eastward) for viola solo (1998); STIM; Swedish Music Information Centre
Polacca Scaniensis, Duo in 3 Movements for violin and viola (1996); STIM; Swedish Music Information Centre
Reminiszenz, 3 Movements for viola solo (or cello solo) (1996); STIM; Swedish Music Information Centre
Rester av en 12-tonsslinga (Traces of a 12-Tone Loop) for viola solo (1982); STIM; Swedish Music Information Centre
Skogshus, där fågeln har sitt näste (Forest Home: Where Birds Make Nest) for 2 violas or violin and viola (1997); STIM; Swedish Music Information Centre
Slovakiskt capriccio (Slovak Capriccio) for flute and viola (1949–1952); STIM; Swedish Music Information Centre
Så att säga (So to Speak) for viola solo (or cello solo) (1996); STIM; Swedish Music Information Centre
Wärend-skutt for violin and viola (1996); STIM; Swedish Music Information Centre

- Gérard Grisey (1946–1998)

Prologue for viola solo (1976); G. Ricordi

- Cor de Groot (1914–1993)

Canto Lirico for viola and piano (1977)
Doyna in C major for viola solo (1977)

- Eric Gross (1926–2011)

Discussion for flute and viola, Op. 296 (2006); Australian Music Centre
Euphonism I B for viola and piano, Op. 230 (1998); Australian Music Centre
Invention No. 1 for viola and piano, Op. 216 No. 1a (1998); Australian Music Centre
The Maid's Lament for mezzo-soprano, flute, viola and harp, Op. 293 (2006); Australian Music Centre
Trialogue for mezzo-soprano (and claves), flute and viola, Op. 296a (2006); Australian Music Centre
Violamorosa for viola and piano, Op. 268 (2002); Australian Music Centre

- Robert Gross (1914–1983)

Sonatina for viola solo (1950s)

- Ferdinand Grossmann (1887–1970)

Cantilena for viola and piano; Concert Music Publishing

- Stefans Grové (1922–2014)

Concertino for viola, flute and chamber orchestra
Duo for viola and cello (1950)
Garden for female chorus, flute and viola (1974); words by Louis Eksteen
Sonata for viola and piano (1994)

- Gabriel Grovlez (1879–1944)

Romance, Scherzo et Finale for viola and piano (1931); Éditions Heugel

- Czesław Grudziński (1911–1992)

Miniatury (Miniatures) for viola and piano (1953); Polskie Wydawnictwo Muzyczne

- Juozas Gruodis (1884–1948)

Jūros daina (Song of the Sea) for viola and piano (1933); from the ballet Jūratė ir Kastytis; published by Vaga, Vilnius, in Dvi pjesės altui su fortepijonu (2 Pieces for Viola and Piano)

- Jorge Grundman (b. 1961)

First Rays of Light on Wet Asphalt for viola and piano, Op. 71 (2014/2020)
Photographs and Memories for viola and piano, Op. 73 (2020)

- Friedrich Grützmacher (1832–1903)

Romanze in F minor for viola and orchestra (or string quartet, or piano), Op. 19 No. 2 (1851)

- Camargo Guarnieri (1907–1993)

Choro for viola and orchestra (1975)
Sonata for viola and piano (1950); J. Carboni, São Paulo

- Carlos Guastavino (1912–2000)

Sonata for clarinet or viola and piano (1971)

- Sofia Gubaidulina (b. 1931)

Garten von Freuden und Traurigkeiten (The Garden of Joy and Sorrow) for flute, viola, harp and narrator (1980); H. Sikorski
Quasi hoquetus for viola, bassoon and piano (1984); H. Sikorski
And: The Feast Is in Full Procession for viola and orchestra (1993)
Concerto for viola and orchestra (1996); G. Schirmer
Two Paths: A Dedication to Mary and Martha for 2 violas solo and orchestra (1998)

- César Guerra-Peixe (1914–1993)

Bilhete de um jogral (Note from a Minstrel) for viola solo (1983); Funarte; Academia Brasileira de Música
Duo for violin and viola (1946)
Miniaturas for viola and piano (1958)
Três peças (3 Pieces) for viola and piano (1957); Academia Brasileira de Música

- Ronan Guilfoyle (b. 1958)

Sonata for viola solo (2002); Contemporary Music Centre Ireland
Sonata for viola and piano (2001); Contemporary Music Centre Ireland

- René Guillou (1903–1958)

Élégie for viola (or English horn) and piano (1927); Henry Lemoine

- Joan Guinjoan (1931–2019)

Dúo for viola and piano (1979)
Micrótono for viola solo (1980); Éditions Amphion; United Music Publishers

- Dwight Gustafson (1930–2014)

Meditation on "What Wondrous Love", Appalachian Hymn for viola, string orchestra and harp (1991); Pinner Publications

- Gene Gutchë (1907–2000)

Interlude for viola and piano, Op. 25 (1956); The Schubert Club

- Benjamín Gutiérrez (b. 1937)

Concerto sobre un Canto Bribri (Concerto on a Bribri Song) for viola and orchestra (1982–1983)

- Barry Guy (b. 1947)

Um 1788 for violin, viola, cello, double bass and string orchestra (1989); Novello & Co.

== H ==
- Georg Friedrich Haas (b. 1953)

...., Double Concerto for accordion, viola and chamber ensemble (1994); Universal Edition
....... for viola and 6 voices (2006); Universal Edition
"... aus freier Lust ... verbunden ..." for various ensembles (including for viola solo; for viola, cello and double bass) (1994–1996); Universal Edition
Les temps tiraillés for 2 violas, bassoon and electronics (2008); Universal Edition
Sextet for 3 violas and 3 cellos (1982); Universal Edition

- Alois Hába (1893–1973)

Concerto for viola and orchestra, Op. 86 (1956–1957); Filmkunst-Musikverlag
Fantasy for viola and quarter-tone piano, Op. 32 (1926)

- Daron Hagen (b. 1961)

Divertimento for viola, harp and vibraphone (1983)
Harp Trio for flute, viola and harp (1988–1989); E.C. Schirmer Publishing
Suite for viola solo (1986); E.C. Schirmer Publishing

- Reynaldo Hahn (1875–1947)

Romanesque for flute, viola and piano (1910)
Soliloque et Forlane for viola and piano (1937); Éditions Max Eschig

- Adolphus Hailstork (b. 1941)

As Falling Leaves for flute, viola and harp (2002); Theodore Presser Company
Divertimento for violin and viola; Theodore Presser Company
Fantasy Piece for viola and piano (2002); Theodore Presser Company
Four Lyric Pieces for viola and piano
Sanctum, Rhapsody for viola and piano (1995); Theodore Presser Company
Two Romances for viola and chamber orchestra (1997); Theodore Presser Company
Variations on a Guyanese Folksong for violin or viola and piano

- Andre Hajdu (1932–2016)

Instants suspendus, 12 Preludes for viola solo (1978); also for cello or violin solo

- Lóránt Hajdú (b. 1937)

Two Movements for viola solo (1974)

- Uzeyir Hajibeyov (1885–1948)

Azerbaijan Folk Song (Азербайджанская народная песня) for viola and piano; Gosudarstvennoe muzykalnoe izdatelstvo (State Music Publishing House)

- Kimmo Hakola (b. 1958)

Double Concerto for violin, viola and orchestra, Op. 97 (2017); Fennica Gehrman

- Cristóbal Halffter (1930–2021)

Alucinaciones (Hallucinations), Collage for viola, cello, and double bass (trio basso) with orchestra (2015); Universal Edition
Concerto for viola and orchestra (2014); Universal Edition
Doble concierto en dos movimientos (Double Concerto in Two Movements) for violin, viola and orchestra (1985); Universal Edition
Leyendo a Jorge Guillén for speaker, viola and cello (1982); Universal Edition
Trio basso for viola, cello and double bass (2014); Universal Edition

- Richard Hall (1903–1982)

Suite for violin and viola (1953); Hinrichsen Edition

- Bengt Hallberg (1932–2013)

Två norrlandslåtar (Two Norrland Songs) for viola and chamber orchestra (1977); Sveriges Radios Musikbibliotek

- Hermann Haller (1914–2002)

Episoden for viola and orchestra (1989)
3 Nocturnes for viola and piano (1972); Edizioni Pegasus

- Hafliði Hallgrímsson (b. 1941)

Botticelli Fragments for viola and cello, Op. 34 (2005); Íslenzk Tónverkamiðstöð
Dagbókarbrot (Notes from a Diary) for viola and piano, Op. 33 (2005); Chester Music
Ombra for viola and string orchestra, Op. 27 (1999); Chester Music

- Joseph Hallman (b. 1979)

Ironies, 5 Bagatelles for viola and piano (2001)

- Dietmar Hallmann (b. 1935)

6 Bagatelles for viola and piano (2003)
Ballata virtuosità for viola solo (1984); Editions Peters
Fantasie Nr. 13 im Stile Telemanns (Fantasie No. 13 in the Style of Telemann) for viola solo (2003)

- Eyvind Hallnäs (b. 1937)

Sonatina for viola and piano (1986); STIM; Swedish Music Information Centre

- Hilding Hallnäs (1903–1984)

Concerto for viola and orchestra (1976–1978); STIM; Swedish Music Information Centre
Legend for viola and piano (1945); Musikaliska Konstföreningen; Swedish Music Information Centre
Sonata for viola and piano, Op. 19 (1943); Musikaliska Konstföreningen; Swedish Music Information Centre
Spel för två (Jeux à deux) for clarinet and viola (1960); STIM; Swedish Music Information Centre

- Johan Halvorsen (1864–1935)

Passacaglia on a Theme of Händel in G minor for violin and viola (1894)
Sarabande con Variazioni on a Theme of Händel in D minor for violin and viola (1894)

- Eero Hämeenniemi (b. 1951)

Concerto for viola and orchestra (2001)

- Iain Hamilton (1922–2000)

Sinfonia Concertante for violin, viola and chamber orchestra (1989)
Sonata for viola and piano, Op. 9 (1950–1951); Edition Schott

- George Frideric Handel (1685–1759)

Concerto in B minor for viola and orchestra (published 1924); misattributed to Handel, but actually composed by Henri Casadesus

- Harutyun Hanesyan (1911–1987)

Andantino for viola (or violin) and piano (1960); Éditions Max Eschig
Élégie for viola (or cello) and piano (published 1930s); Éditions Max Eschig
Menuetto for viola (or cello) and piano (published 1930s); Éditions Max Eschig
Nocturne for viola (or cello) and piano (published 1930s); Éditions Max Eschig
Pastorale et rondo for viola and piano (1960); Éditions Max Eschig
Prélude et caprice for viola and piano (1960); Éditions Max Eschig
Romance for viola and piano (1962); Éditions Max Eschig

- Peter Hannan (b. 1953)

RSRCH 11/87 for viola solo (1987); Canadian Music Centre

- Norbert von Hannenheim (1898–1945)

Duo for violin and viola
Sonata No. 1 for viola and piano
Sonata No. 2 for viola and piano (1937)
Stück Nr. 1 (Piece No. 1) for viola and piano
Stück Nr. 3 (Piece No. 3) for viola and piano
Stück Nr. 4 (Piece No. 4) for viola and piano
Suite for viola and piano (1937)

- Olga Hans (b. 1971)

Dialogi (Dialogues) for 2 violas (1994)
Dialogi 2 (Dialogues 2) for viola and cello (1997)
Da suonare a tre for viola, cello and piano (1996)

- Peter Hänsel (1770–1831)

3 Duos for violin and viola, Op. 26 (c.1810?); Amadeus Verlag
Trois thémas variés for violin and viola, Op. 4 (c.1800); A.J. Heuwekemeijer

- Howard Hanson (1896–1981)

Lux aeterna, Symphonic Poem for orchestra with viola obligato, Op. 24 (1923–1926); G. Schirmer
Summer Seascape No. 2 for viola and string orchestra (1965)

- Jan Hanuš (1915–2004)

Diptych for viola solo, Op. 115 No. 2 (1988–1989); Český Hudební Fond
Sonatina for viola and piano, Op. 37 (1956); Artia; Český Hudební Fond

- Barbara Harbach (b. 1946)

Rustic Scene for viola and piano (2004); Vivace Press

- John Harbison (b. 1938)

Cucaraccia and Fugue for viola quartet (2003); Associated Music Publishers
Concerto for viola and orchestra (1988); Associated Music Publishers
Sonata for viola solo (1961); Associated Music Publishers
The Violist's Notebook, Book 1 (2002); Associated Music Publishers
The Violist's Notebook, Book 2 (2002); Associated Music Publishers

- Carl Gilbert Hardebeck (1869–1945)

The Lark in the Clear Air for viola and piano (1927); Augener Editions

- Kenneth Harding (1903–1992)

Concertante for 4 violas (1950) or 5 violas (1972)
Concerto for viola and orchestra (1950)
Divertimento for 4 violas (1949); Corda Music Publications
Duet Rhapsody for soprano and viola (1952)
June Sunrise – Blue Sky, Idyll for 12 violas (1978)
Kammersymphonie for 9 violas (1956)
Legend for viola and piano (1985)
Metamorphsen for viola and string orchestra (1981)
Moonlit Apples for viola and piano (1979); Comus Edition
Phantasy of Light, Phantasy-Scherzo for 4 violas (1990)
Poem No. 1 for viola and piano (1931); Comus Edition
Renata da Capo for 10 violas (1987); Comus Edition
Rondo Capriccio for 6 violas (1986); Corda Music Publications
Scherzo (Enigma) for violin and viola (published 1950); J. & W. Chester
Sonata for viola and piano (1979); Comus Edition
Sonatina for 2 violas (1951); Comus Edition
Suite for 3 violas (1980)
Sunset Paradise for 7 violas (1986)
Where the Willows Meet for viola and piano (1990)

- Halina Harelava (b. 1951)

Al Sereno, Concert Fantasy for viola and piano (1998)
Concerto for viola, string orchestra and bells (2000); Sordino Ediziuns Musicalas
Eine kleine Nachtmusik for viola and piano (2001)
Introduction and Fantasy on a Ragtime Theme for viola and piano (2003)
Lucia perpetuo moto for viola and piano (2001)

- James Harley (b. 1959)

Here the Bird for viola and piano (1993); Canadian Music Centre

- Chris Harman (b. 1970)

Sonata for viola and piano (1991)
Uta, Concerto for viola and orchestra (1999–2000); Canadian Music Centre

- Ross Harris (b. 1945)

Chaconne for solo viola (2003); Centre for New Zealand Music
Trio for flute, viola and harp (1973); Centre for New Zealand Music

- Roy Harris (1898–1979)

Elegy and Paean for viola and orchestra (1948)
Lamentation for soprano, viola and piano (1944); Belwin Mills
Soliloquy and Dance for viola and piano (1938); G. Schirmer

- William Henry Harris (1883–1973)

Suite for viola and piano (1952); Oxford University Press

- Julius Harrison (1885–1963)

Sonata in C minor for viola and piano (1945); Alfred Lengnick

- Lou Harrison (1917–2003)

Threnody for Carlos Chávez for gamelan degung and viola (1978); Music for Gamelan and Western Instr.

- Pamela Harrison (1915–1990)

Lament for viola and piano (published 1963); Augener; Galaxy Music
Sonata for viola and piano (1946); PH Music; British Music Information Centre

- Sadie Harrison (b. 1965)

3 Dances for Diana Nemorensis for viola solo (2013); University of York Music Press

- Tibor Harsányi (1898–1954)

Sonata for viola and piano (1953–1954); Alphonse Leduc

- Walter S. Hartley (1927–2016)

Lyric Suite for viola, tenor saxophone and piano, Op. 189 (1993); To the Fore Publishers
Sonata for viola and piano, Op. 18 (1952); Interlochen Press; Wingert-Jones Music
Three Duets for violin and viola, Op. 34 (1959); Interlochen Press; Wingert-Jones Music

- Karl Amadeus Hartmann (1905–1963)

Konzert für Bratsche mit Klavier (Concerto for Viola with Piano) for viola, piano, wind instruments and percussion (1954–1956); Edition Schott

- Jonathan Harvey (1939–2012)

Chant for viola solo (1992–1994); Faber Music
Jubilus for viola and chamber ensemble (2003); Faber Music

- Richard Harvey (b. 1953)

Concerto for viola and orchestra (1990)
Reflections for viola and small orchestra (1990, 2012)

- Gotfrid Hasanov (Gasanov) (1900–1965)

Rhapsody (Рапсодия) for viola and orchestra (1965)

- Christos Hatzis (b. 1953)

From the Vanishing Gardens of Eden for 12 violas and tape (1992); Promethean Editions
The Mega4 Meta4, Fifth Piece of the Earthrise Cycle for viola and tape (1990); Promethean Editions
Nadir for recorder (or flute), viola and tape (1988); Promethean Editions
Pyrrichean Dances for viola, percussion and string orchestra (2001); Promethean Editions
Rebirth for viola and orchestra (2006); Promethean Editions

- Roman Haubenstock-Ramati (1919–1994)

Multiple 1 for 2 players (2 violas, or viola and cello, etc.) (1969); Universal Edition

- Hans Haug (1900–1967)

Fantasia Concertante for viola and orchestra (1964); Edizioni Curci

- Teppo Hauta-aho (1941–2021)

Adagio e Scherzo for viola solo (1972); Edition Fazer; Fennica Gehrman; Warner/Chappell Music Finland; Finnish Music Information Centre
Duettino for violin and viola (1990); Finnish Music Information Centre
Gunthrope Phantasy III for viola and double bass (1990); Finnish Music Information Centre
Homage à Rossini for viola and double bass (1980); Finnish Music Information Centre
3 Pieces for viola solo (1982); Finnish Music Information Centre
Puukenkätanssi (Clog Dance) for viola (or violin, or cello) and piano (1990); Finnish Music Information Centre
Tuokioita (Moments) for viola and piano (1975); Finnish Music Information Centre
Viola-aaria for viola and piano (1988); Finnish Music Information Centre

- Svatopluk Havelka (1925–2009)

Tichá radost (Quiet Joy) for viola solo (1985); Český Hudební Fond

- Hanna Havrylets (1958–2022)

А-Cordа, Sinfonietta for viola and string orchestra (2001)
Concerto for viola and orchestra (1984)
Sonata for viola and piano (1988)

- Hikaru Hayashi (1931–2012)

Vines (蔓枝) for viola solo
Viola Concerto "Elegia" (悲歌) for viola and string orchestra (1995); Zen-On Music
Viola Sonata "Process" (プロセス) for viola and piano (2002)

- Joseph Haydn (1732–1809)

Duet in C major for 2 violas, Hob. XII:4; originally in G major for 2 Barytons; Walter Wollenweber
6 Sonatas for violin and viola, Hob. VI:1–6; Verlag Doblinger

- Michael Haydn (1737–1806)

Concerto (Duo Concertante) in C major for viola, organ (or harpsichord) and string orchestra, MH 41, P. 55
Duo (Sonata) in C major for violin and viola, MH 335, P. 127 (1783)
Duo (Sonata) in D major for violin and viola, MH 336, P. 128
Duo (Sonata) in E major for violin and viola, MH 337, P. 129
Duo (Sonata) in F major for violin and viola, MH 338, P. 130

- Xuntian He (b. 1952)

Whirling Udumbara II (优昙波罗旋转舞II) for viola, cello and He-drum (2012); Schott Music

- Christopher Headington (1930–1996)

Adagio and Capriccio for viola and piano (1966)

- Derek Healey (b. 1936)

From the West, 4 Pieces for viola solo, Op. 72 (1990) or for viola and piano, Op. 72b (2002); Canadian Music Centre
A Northern Phantasy for clarinet, viola and piano, Op. 105 (2006); Canadian Music Centre

- Anthony Hedges (1931–2019)

Companion Pieces for violin or viola and piano, Op. 133; Piper Publications
Simon's Samba for viola and piano (1985); Westfield Music
Sonatina for viola and piano, Op. 91 (1982, revised 1993); Westfield Music

- David Philip Hefti (b. 1975)

con anima, Mosaik (Mosaic) for viola solo (2015); Edition Kunzelmann
Poème lunaire for viola and piano (2008); Edition Kunzelmann

- Lars Hegaard (b. 1950)

Different Worlds for viola and orchestra (2001); Edition Samfundet
13 Short Pieces for flute, viola and harp (1990); Edition Samfundet

- Bernhard Heiden (1910–2000)

Sonata for viola and piano (1958); Associated Music Publishers

- Paavo Heininen (1938–2022)

Cantilena I for viola solo, Op. 24 (1970); Fennica Gehrma

- Heinrich XXIV, Prinz Reuss (1855–1910)

Sonata in G major for viola and piano, Op. 22 (1904)

- Steve Heitzeg (b. 1959)

Seven Tree Prayers for viola solo (2000); Stone Circle Music
When Violets Appear for viola and piano (2004); Stone Circle Music

- Walter Hekster (1937–2012)

Occurrence for viola solo (1969); Donemus
Parts of a World for viola and orchestra (1976); Donemus
Towards Dawn for viola and piano (2001)
Trio for clarinet, viola and piano (1990); Donemus

- Piers Hellawell (b. 1956)

Inside Story for violin, viola and orchestra (1999); Maecenas Music

- Barbara Heller (b. 1936)

Nah oder fern (Near or Far) for viola solo (1982, 1987–1988); Moeck Verlag; Edition Schott

- Henrik Hellstenius (b. 1963)

The Golden Shield for viola and piano (1996); Music Information Centre Norway

- Everett Helm (1913–1999)

Sonata for viola and piano (1944)

- Oscar van Hemel (1892–1981)

Concerto for viola and orchestra (1951); Donemus
Sonata for viola and piano (1942); Heuwekemeijer Amsterdam
Trio for violin, viola and piano (1937); Donemus

- Wim Henderickx (1962–2022)

Raga III for viola and orchestra (1995); CeBeDeM
Searching for viola and marimba (1986); CeBeDeM

- Moya Henderson (b. 1941)

Ku-ring-gai Chase for violin, viola and cello soli with orchestra (1999); Australian Music Centre
Tracker's Song from Act III of Lindy for viola and piano (1997); Australian Music Centre

- Hans Henkemans (1913–1995)

Concerto for viola and orchestra (1950); Donemus

- Christian Henking (b. 1961)

9 Fragmente (9 Fragments) for viola and piano (1985); Müller & Schade
Stück (Piece) for 5 violas (or 5 cellos) (1989–1997); Müller & Schade

- Swan Hennessy (1866–1929)

Sonatine celtique in C minor for viola and piano, Op. 62 (1924); title on the cover of the print reads Sonate celtique, on the first page of music it is "Sonatine"; Max Eschig & Cie.
Quatre Morceaux (4 Pieces) for viola or alto saxophone and piano, Op. 71 (1929); Éditions Max Eschig
Deuxième Sonatine (Sonatine No. 2) for violin or viola and piano, Op. 80 (1929); Propriété de l'auteur (self-published)

- Hans Werner Henze (1926–2012)

An Brenton, Song for viola solo (1993); Edition Schott
Compases para Preguntos Ensimismadas for viola and 22 players (1969–1970); Edition Schott
Selbst- und Zwiegespräche, Trio for viola, guitar and chamber organ (1984–1985); Edition Schott
Serenade for viola solo (1949, 2003); original for cello solo; adapted by Garth Knox; Edition Schott
Sonata for viola and piano (1978–1979); Edition Schott

- Jörg Herchet (b. 1943)

Komposition (Composition) for oboe and viola (1973); Breitkopf & Härtel

- Rházes Hernández-López (1918–1991)

Sonata for viola and piano (1952)

- Ferdinand Hérold (1791–1833)

4 Sonatas for viola and piano

- Philippe Hersant (b. 1948)

Duo Séphardim for viola and bassoon (1993); Éditions Durand
Huit Duos (8 Duos) for viola and bassoon (1995); Éditions Durand
Musical Humors, Concerto for viola and string orchestra (2003); Éditions Durand
Pavane for viola solo (1987); Éditions Durand
Six Bagatelles for clarinet, viola and piano (2007); Éditions Durand
Tenebrae for viola and piano (2005); Éditions Durand
Trois Nocturnes for flute, viola and harp (2001); Éditions Durand

- Michael Hersch (b. 1971)

After Hölderlin's Hälfte des Lebens for viola and cello (2002)
Sonata for unaccompanied viola (1993)

- William Herschel (1738–1822)

Concerto No. 1 in C major for viola, string orchestra and continuo (1759)
Concerto No. 2 in D minor for viola, string orchestra and continuo (1759)
Concerto No. 3 in F major for viola, string orchestra and continuo (1759)

- Heinrich von Herzogenberg (1843–1900)

3 Legenden (3 Legends) for viola and piano, Op. 62 (1889)

- Ernst Hess (1912–1968)

Concerto for viola, cello and chamber orchestra, Op. 20
Suite for viola solo, Op. 14 (1936)

- Willy Hess (1906–1997)

Double Concerto in F major for violin, viola and orchestra, Op. 81 (1974); Amadeus Verlag
Duo in C major for flute and viola, Op. 89 (1977); Amadeus Verlag
Sonata in C major for viola solo, Op. 77 (1972–1973); Amadeus Verlag
Sonata in C minor for viola and bassoon (or cello), Op. 78 (1973); Amadeus Verlag
Sonate in altem Stil (Sonata in Old Style) for viola and harp or piano, Op. 135 (1989); Amadeus Verlag

- Kurt Hessenberg (1908–1994)

Sonata for viola and piano, Op. 94 (1974); Edition Schott
Zwei kleine Stücke (Two Little Pieces) for 2 violas (c.1955); Edition Schott

- Jacques Hétu (1938–2010)

Variations for viola solo, Op. 11 (1967, 1984); Éditions Doberman-Yppan

- Thomas Hewitt Jones (b. 1984)

Romance for viola and piano (2009); Metronome Music Ltd.

- Walter Thomas Heyn (b. 1953)

Berliner Musike III for viola and piano, Op. 53b; Verlag Neue Musik
Es fallen die Gedanken in mein Gemüt wie Schnee for viola and guitar, Op. 26; Verlag Neue Musik
Silicernium III for viola and chamber orchestra, Op. 102

- Frigyes Hidas (1928–2007)

Concerto for viola and orchestra (1959)

- Jennifer Higdon (b. 1962)

Concerto for viola and orchestra (2015)
Sonata for viola and piano (1990); Lawdon Press

- Alfred Hill (1869–1960)

Concerto in A minor for viola and orchestra (1940); Southern Music Publishing, Sydney; Peer Music

- Anthony Herschel Hill (1939–2016)

Two Pieces for viola and piano (1982); Stainer & Bell

- Wilhelm Hill (1838–1902)

Notturno, Scherzo und Romanze for viola and piano, Op. 18 (1868)
2 Romanzen (2 Romances) for cello or viola and piano, Op. 22 (1869)

- Anders Hillborg (b. 1954)

Atlas Peak Airs for viola and piano (2020–2021); Faber Music
Concerto for viola and orchestra (2021); Faber Music
Musik för 10 altvioliner (Music for 10 Violas) (1987, 1993); Swedish Music Information Centre

- Lejaren Hiller (1924–1994)

Diabelskie skrzypce (The Devil's Violin) for violin, or viola, or cello and harpsichord, Op. 58 (1978); Kallisti Music Press

- Paul Hindemith (1895–1963)

Duett (Scherzo) for viola and cello (1934); Edition Schott
Der Schwanendreher for viola and small orchestra (1935); Edition Schott
Kammermusik No. 5 for viola and chamber orchestra, Op. 36 No. 4 (1927); Edition Schott
Konzertmusik for viola and large chamber orchestra, Op. 48 (1930); Edition Schott
Meditation from Nobilissima visione for viola and piano (1938); Edition Schott
Sonata for solo viola, Op. 11 No. 5 (1919); Edition Schott
Sonata for solo viola, Op. 25 No. 1 (1922); Edition Schott
Sonata for solo viola, Op. 31 No. 4 (1923); Edition Schott
Sonata for solo viola (1937); Edition Schott
Sonata in F for viola and piano, Op. 11 No. 4 (1919); Edition Schott
Sonata for viola and piano, Op. 25 No. 4 (1922); Edition Schott
Sonata for viola and piano (1939); Edition Schott
Trauermusik for viola and string orchestra (1936); Edition Schott
Trio for viola, heckelphone (or tenor saxophone) and piano, Op. 47 (1928); Edition Schott

- Matthew Hindson (b. 1968)

2 + 5 <> 6 for violin or viola solo (2004, 2008); Faber Music
Basement Art Guru for violin or viola solo (2004, 2008); Faber Music
Chrissietina's Magic Fantasy for violin and viola (1998); Faber Music
Lament for viola and piano (1996–2002); Faber Music
Prelude and Estampie for viola and piano (1986); Faber Music
Repetepetition for violin or viola solo (2004, 2008); Faber Music
Siegfried Interlude No. 4 – The Ride of the (Viola) Valkyries for 8 violas (1998); Faber Music
Two Marine Portraits for violin, viola and electronics (1997); Faber Music

- Alistair Hinton (b. 1950)

Après une lecture de Liszt for viola and double bass, Op. 43 (2001); The Sorabji Archive

- Caspar René Hirschfeld (b. 1965)

Canto Largo for viola and harp, Op. 82b (2001)
Canto Largo for violin, viola (or saxophone) and orchestra (2020)
Elegie for oboe, viola and harp, Op. 85 (2001)
3 Miniaturen (3 Miniatures) (also known as 3 Movements) for viola solo, Op. 115 (2012)
Musik für Viola Solo (Music) for viola solo, Op. 130 (2016)
...wie des Grases Blumen..., Elegy for viola solo, Op. 134 (2017)
Zikaden for viola and tape (2015)

- Jim Hiscott (b. 1948)

The Bay of Naples for viola and button accordion (2004)
H.M. for viola solo (1984); Canadian Music Centre
Spiral for 2 violas (2003)
Romantic Nights for viola and 2 percussionists (1993); Canadian Music Centre

- Emil Hlobil (1901–1987)

Contemplazione for viola and string orchestra, Op. 75 (1969); Český Hudební Fond

- Gilad Hochman (b. 1982)

Momentango for viola solo (2025)
Polarizations for viola solo (2023)
Akeda (The Binding of Isaac) for viola solo (2006)

- Alun Hoddinott (1929–2008)

Concertino for viola and small orchestra, Op. 14 (1958); Oxford University Press

- Margriet Hoenderdos (1952–2010)

December '02 for viola solo (2002)
Februari '03 for viola solo (2003)
Lex inertiae No. 2 for viola solo (1989)

- Bernard Hoffer (b. 1934)

Concerto for viola and orchestra (1993)
Sonata for viola and piano (1992)

- Paul Höffer (1895–1949)

Bratschen-Musik mit Klavier (Viola Music with Piano) (1946); Mitteldeutscher Verlag

- Joel Hoffman (b. 1953)

Abbassare for viola solo (1976, 2007); Onibatan Music
départs for viola solo (2009); Onibatan Music
Double Concerto for viola, cello and orchestra (1984); Onibatan Music
Duo for Viola and Piano (1983); Onibatan Music
Krakow Variations for viola solo (1999); Onibatan Music
Triple Concerto for violin, viola, cello and orchestra (1978); Onibatan Music

- Richard Hoffmann (1925–2021)

Duo for viola and cello (1949, 1965); Mobart Music Publications

- Franz Anton Hoffmeister (1754–1812)

Concerto in B♭ major for viola and orchestra
Concerto in D major for viola and orchestra
3 Duos Concertants for flute and viola (1789–1790)
3 Duos for violin and viola, Op. 6; original for violin and cello
3 Duos for violin and viola, Op. 7
6 Duos for violin and viola, Op. 13
6 Duos for violin and viola, Op. 19 (1788)
6 Duos for violin and viola, Op. 65 (c.1803)
12 Etudes for solo viola

- Richard Hofmann (1844–1918)

Acht Übungs- und Vortrags-Stücke (8 Exercise and Lecture Pieces) for violin and viola, Op. 82 (1892)
Die ersten Etüden für Viola: Zwanzig Studien in der ersten Lage (The First Etudes for Viola: 20 Studies in First Position) for viola solo, Op. 86 (1893)
15 Etüden für Viola mit Anwendung verschiedener Lagen zum Gebrauche für vorgeschrittne Spieler (15 Etudes for Viola with Application in Different Positions for Advanced Players) for viola solo, Op. 87 (1893)
Sonatine für angehende Spieler (Sonatina for Advancing Players) in F major for viola (or flute) and piano, Op. 46 (1885)
Viola Schule: Praktischer Lehrgang in drei Teilen (Viola School: Practical Course in Three Parts), Op. 40

- Hendrik Hofmeyr (b. 1957)

Partita for viola solo (2001)
Sonata for viola and piano (2017)

- Lee Hoiby (1926–2011)

Ciaconetta for viola and piano (1990); Theodore Presser Company

- Josef Holbrooke (1878–1958)

Nocturne: Fairyland for viola, oboe and piano, Op. 57 No. 1 (1900); Rudall, Carte & Co.

- Trevor Hold (1939–2004)

Duo for violin and viola, Op. 13; British Music Information Centre
Topsy-Turvy World for contralto, viola and piano (1999); poem by William Brighty Rands
The Weathercock, Fantasia for viola and piano, Op. 17 (1965); British Music Information Centre

- Lee Holdridge (b. 1944)

Concerto for viola and chamber orchestra

- Dulcie Holland (1913–2000)

Follow Me for violin, viola and piano (1987); Australian Music Centre
Sonatina for viola and piano (1932); Australian Music Centre
Summer Afternoon for viola and piano (1995); Australian Music Centre

- Theodore Holland (1878–1947)

Ellingham Marshes for viola and orchestra (1940); Hinrichsen Edition
Suite in D for viola and piano (1935); Boosey & Hawkes

- Karl Höller (1907–1987)

Sonata for cello or viola and piano, Op. 31 (1943, revised 1967); original 1943 work for cello and piano; Henry Litolff's Verlag; Edition Peters
Sonata in E minor "In Memoriam Paul Hindemith" for viola and piano, Op. 62 (1967); Edition Schott

- Alan Holley (b. 1954)

The Winged Viola for viola and ensemble (2004)

- Heinz Holliger (b. 1939)

Recicanto for viola and small orchestra (2000–2001); Schott Music
Souvenirs de Davos III for viola solo (1999–2000); Schott Music
Souvenirs trémaësques for viola solo (2001); Schott Music
Three Machaut Transcriptions for 3 violas; Schott Music
Three Sketches for violin and viola (2006); Schott Music
Trema for viola solo (1980); Schott Music
Trio for oboe, viola and harp (1966); Schott Music

- Robin Holloway (b. 1943)

Concerto for viola and small orchestra, Op. 56 (1984); Boosey & Hawkes
Sonata for viola and piano, Op. 87 (1999)
Trio for clarinet, viola and piano, Op. 79 (1993–1994); Boosey & Hawkes

- Vagn Holmboe (1909–1996)

Concertino No. 1 for violin, viola and string orchestra, Op. 22 (1940); Edition Wilhelm Hansen
Concerto for violin, viola and orchestra, Op. 39; Edition Wilhelm Hansen
Concerto for viola, oboe and small orchestra, Op. 67; Edition Wilhelm Hansen
Concerto No. 1 for viola and orchestra, Op. 31, M. 141 (1943); Edition Wilhelm Hansen
Concerto No. 2 for viola and orchestra, Op. 189, M. 357 (1991–1992); Edition Wilhelm Hansen
Duo Concertante for violin and viola, Op. 83; Edition Wilhelm Hansen
Sonata for viola solo, Op. 178 (1988); Edition Wilhelm Hansen

- Leonie Holmes (b. 1962)

Recitative II for viola and percussion (1991); Sounz New Zealand

- Gustav Holst (1874–1934)

Lyric Movement for viola and small orchestra, H. 191 (1933); Oxford University Press
Terzetto for flute, oboe and viola, H. 158 (1925); Chester Music

- Imogen Holst (1907–1984)

Duo for viola and piano (1968)
4 Easy Pieces for viola and piano (1935); Augener Editions
Joyce's Divertimento for solo viola and orchestra (1976); Sphemusations Edition
Prometheus, Incidental Music for soprano, mezzo-soprano, baritone, chorus and viola (1950)
Serenade for flute, viola and bassoon (1942)
Suite for viola solo (1930); British Music Information Centre
Terzetto for flute, oboe and viola (1925); Chester Music

- Patricia Blomfield Holt (1910–2003)

Metamorphosis for viola and piano (1985); Berandol Music; Canadian Music Centre
Suite No. 2 for violin or viola and piano (1939); BMI Canada; Canadian Music Centre

- Simon Holt (b. 1958)

Mantis for viola solo (2005); Chester Music
the other side of silence for flute, viola and harp (2004); Chester Music
walking with the river's roar for viola and orchestra (1990–1991, revised 2006); Chester Music

- Ignaz Holzbauer (1711–1783)

Concerto in E♭ major for viola, cello and string orchestra (c.1742–1750); Edition Eulenburg

- Joaquim Homs (1906–2003)

2 Monòlegs (2 Monologues) for viola (or cello) solo (1979–1980); Dinsic Publicacions Musicals
Seqüència for viola (or cello) solo (1982); Dinsic Publicacions Musicals

- Arthur Honegger (1892–1955)

Sonata for viola and piano, H. 28 (1920)

- David Hönigsberg (1959–2005)

Haiku Screen for tenor or light baritone, viola and harp (1982)
On Meeting Miss Fairfax for the First Time for viola and piano, Op. 52 (1987)
3 Pictures of an African Life, Concerto for viola and large orchestra (or 2 pianos and percussion) (1989)
Trio for viola, cello and piano (1988)
Via cruxis for alto, clarinet and viola (2004)

- Katherine Hoover (1937–2018)

El Andalus for cello (or viola) and piano (2003); Papagena Press
Shadows for viola and piano (2001); Papagena Press

- David Horne (b. 1970)

Filters for viola and piano (1998); Boosey & Hawkes
Stilled Voices for viola solo (1995); Boosey & Hawkes

- Zoltán Horusitzky (1903–1985)

Sonata for viola and piano (1970); Editio Musica Budapest

- Toshio Hosokawa (b. 1955)

Into the Depth of Time (時の深みへ; In die Tiefe der Zeit) for viola and accordion (1996); Schott Japan
Lied II (リート II) for viola and piano (2008); Schott Japan
Threnody: To the Victims of the Tōhoku Earthquake 3.11 (哀歌 −東日本大震災の犠牲者に捧げる−) for viola solo (2011); Schott Japan
Two Arrangements for Viola (ヴィオラ編曲作品集) (2006); Schott Japan
1. O Mensch, bewei'n dein' Sünde groß by Johann Sebastian Bach for viola and piano
2. Lascia ch'io pianga by Georg Friedrich Händel for viola solo
Voyage VI (旅 VI) for viola and string orchestra (2002); Schott Japan

- Stephen Hough (b. 1961)

Sonata for viola and piano (1982); Josef Weinberger Music Publishing

- Alan Hovhaness (1911–2000)

Campuan Sonata for viola and piano, Op. 371 (1982); Lim Chong Keat
Chahagir (Torch Bearer) for viola solo, Op. 56a (1944); Rongwen Music; Broude Brothers Limited
Sonata for solo viola, Op. 423 (1995); Broude Brothers Limited
Talin, Concerto for viola and string orchestra, Op. 93 (1951–1952); Associated Music Publishers

- Egil Hovland (1924–2013)

Concerto for viola and orchestra, Op. 153 (1996–1997); Norsk Musikforlag

- John Tasker Howard (1890–1964)

Still Waters: Rêverie on a Psalm Tune for viola and piano (1946); Edition Musicus

- Herbert Howells (1892–1983)

Elegy for viola, string quartet and string orchestra, Op. 17 (1917); Boosey & Hawkes

- Alexandru Hrisanide (1936–2018)

Sonata (Music) for viola and piano (1965); Uniunea, Bucharest; Editions Gerig

- Ivan Hrušovský (1927–2001)

Elégia for mezzo-soprano and viola (1985); Slovenský Hudobný Fond
Lamento 94/95 for violin and viola (1995); Slovenský Hudobný Fond

- Ruo Huang (b. 1976)

Being... for alto saxophone (or clarinet) and viola (1999)
Wind Blows... for viola and piano (2007)

- Jenő Hubay (1858–1937)

A képe előtt (Before Her Picture; Vor ihrem Bild; Devant son image) for viola and piano, Op. 38 No. 1 (1892); original for violin and piano; adaptation by B. Unkelstein
Álmodozás (Rêverie) for viola and piano, Op. 49 No. 9 (1894); original for violin and piano; adaptation by Edwin H. Lemare
Ballade for viola and harmonium, Op. 104 No. 1a (c.1904); reconstruction by Lajos Huszár
Concerto in C major for viola and orchestra, Op. 20 (1884–1888); orchestration incomplete; movements II and III orchestrated by Lajos Huszár
Májusi dal (Maggiolata; Chant de Mai) in B♭ major for viola or cello and piano (or orchestra), Op. 15 No. 2 (1882)
Mese (Fairy Tale; Un conte; Märchen) for violin or viola and piano, Op. 15 No. 1 (1882)
Morceau de Concert in C major for viola and orchestra, Op. 20 (1884–1888, revised 1891); revision of movement I from the Viola Concerto
Napfény (Ray of Sunshine; Rayon de Soleil) for viola and piano, Op. 87 No. 1 (1899); original for violin and piano; adaptation by the composer

- Klaus Huber (1924–2017)

Das kleine Lied: Zweimal sieben Duette (The Little Song: Double Seven Duets) for alto voice and viola (1955)
Fragmente aus Frühling (Fragments from Spring) for mezzo-soprano, viola and piano (1987); Ricordi
...Ohne Grenze und Rand... (...Without Boundary and Edge...) for viola and chamber orchestra (1977); Edition Schott

- Nicolaus A. Huber (b. 1939)

Als eine Aussicht weit... for flute, viola and harp (1996); Breitkopf & Härtel
EN for viola solo (2007); Breitkopf & Härtel
Titty Twister for viola and accordion (2009); Breitkopf & Härtel

- Werner Hübschmann (1901–1969)

Concerto for viola and orchestra (1928)

- Jiří Hudec (1923–1996)

Uspávanka pro Martinku (Lullaby for Martinek) for viola and orchestra (1980); Český Hudební Fond

- Georges Hüe (1858–1948)

Thème varié (Theme and Variations) in F♯ minor for viola and piano (1907)

- Bertold Hummel (1925–2002)

Albumblatt (Album Leaf) for viola and piano, Op. 87a (1987); N. Simrock Hamburg-London; Boosey & Hawkes; Schott Music
Divertimento for viola and English horn, Op. 62b (1977); J. Schuberth & Co. Hamburg; Schott Music
Elegie for viola and piano (1999); Schott Music
Fantasia in G for viola solo, Op. 77d2 (1952); N. Simrock Hamburg-London; Boosey & Hawkes; Schott Music
Fantasia Poetica for viola and hammered dulcimer, Op. 101b (1997); Vogt & Fritz
Fantasie for viola and chamber orchestra, Op. 13f (1956)
Finale (Introduction and Allegro molto) for 4 violas, Op. 36b (1969, 1997); N. Simrock Hamburg-London; Boosey & Hawkes
Little Suite for viola and piano, Op. 19c (1956); N. Simrock Hamburg-London; Boosey & Hawkes; Schott Music
Romanze for viola and piano, Op. 69d (1975); J. Schuberth & Co. Hamburg; Schott Music
Sonatina No. 1 in C major for viola and piano, Op. 35b (1969, 1971); N. Simrock Hamburg-London; Boosey & Hawkes; Schott Music
Sonatina No. 2 for viola and piano, Op. 52b (1973); N. Simrock Hamburg-London; Boosey & Hawkes; Schott Music
Sostenuto for viola and piano (or organ), Op. 11b (1955); N. Simrock Hamburg-London; Boosey & Hawkes; Schott Music
Trio for clarinet, viola and piano, Op. 76a (1981); J. Schuberth & Co. Hamburg; Schott Music
Trio Facile for violin, viola and piano, Op. 101a (1996); Schott Music

- Franz Hummel (1939–2022)

Hatikva (Hope) for viola and orchestra (1992); Accent-Musikverlag

- Johann Nepomuk Hummel (1778–1837)

Potpourri on Il mio tesoro in G minor (includes Fantasie in G minor) for viola, 2 clarinets and string orchestra, Op. 94 (1820)
Sonata in E♭ major for viola and piano, Op. 5 No. 3 (c.1798)
Trio in G major for 2 violas and cello, S. 46 (1801)

- Xander Hunfeld (b. 1949)

Triptiek (Triptych), Sonatina for viola and piano (2006); Donemus

- Jean Huré (1877–1930)

Petite chanson (Little Song) in D major for cello (or viola) and piano (1901); Éditions Salabert

- William Yeates Hurlstone (1876–1906)

4 Characteristic Pieces for viola and piano; original for clarinet and piano; edited by Lionel Tertis; Novello & Co.

- Ilja Hurník (1922–2013)

Concerto for viola and string orchestra (1994); Český Hudební Fond
Sonata for viola and piano, Op. 26 (1951); Státní Nakladatelství Krásné Literatury, Hudby a Umění; Český Hudební Fond
Variace na Beethovenovo téma (Variations on a Theme of Beethoven) for viola and piano (1998); Ritornel, Ostrava; Český Hudební Fond

- Karel Husa (1921–2016)

Poem for viola and piano or chamber orchestra (1959); Edition Schott
Suite for viola and piano, Op. 5 (1945); Associated Music Publishers

- Henry Holden Huss (1862–1953)

In Love, If Love Be Love (Vivian's Song) for mezzo-soprano, viola obbligato and piano
Sonata "Sonata Rhapsodic" for viola and piano (1919); only Movement I complete; American Viola Society Publications

- Albert Huybrechts (1899–1938)

Pastourelle for viola and piano (1934); original for viola da gamba or cello and piano; transcription by Arie Van de Moortel (1947); CeBeDeM
Sonatine for flute and viola (1934); CeBeDeM
Trio for flute, viola and piano (1926); CeBeDeM

- Miriam Hyde (1913–2005)

Canzonetta for viola and piano (1988); Australian Music Centre
Sonata in B minor for viola and piano (1937); Perth: Keys Press; Australian Music Centre
Two Pieces for viola and piano (1946); Perth: Keys Press; Australian Music Centre

1. Scherzino
2. Passing Thoughts

- Lee Hyla (1952–2014)

How Was Your Weekend for viola and cello (1994)
Quarry for baritone and viola (2004); words by Paul Auster
