= Karl Adolf Lorenz =

German composer

Karl Adolf Lorenz (13 August 1837 – 3 March 1923) was a German conductor, composer, and music pedagogue.

== Career ==
Born in Köslin, his family moved to Stettin where he attended the Marienstiftsgymnasium (de) (a school) for 16 years. During those 16 years, Lorenz studied music with composer Heinrich Trieste (1808–1885). In 1857, Lorenz went on to study at the Humboldt University of Berlin, earning a PhD in philosophy in 1861.

In philosophy he was highly influenced by his study of Arthur Schopenhauer. In music, he studied counterpoint with Siegfried Dehn, piano and composition with Friedrich Kiel and instrumentation with choirmaster Wenzel Gährich, all at the Humboldt University of Berlin. Lorenz remained in Berlin until 1864, during which he had several conducting engagements of the Meixnerschen glee club. In 1864, Lorenz moved to Strasbourg to conduct the Musical Society. Two years later he became professor at his alma mater, the Marienstiftsgymnasium. Three years before the death of Carl Loewe in 1869, Lorenz became his successor as music director and organist at the Jakobikirche, Stettin.; and he also became an opera critic. Lorenz died in 1923 in Stettin.

Until 1945 Lorenz had been honored in Köslin, the town of his birth and the town where he grew up, by a memorial plaque and both Köslin and Stettin had streets bearing his surname.

== Selected compositions ==
As composer, he achieved great success with his oratorio Winfried (1888), Otto der Grosse, (1890) Krösus, (1890) Die Jungfrau von Orleans, (1893) Golgatha,, (1903) Das Licht (1907), and the opera Harald und Theano (Hanover, 1893).
