= Diamandi Gheciu =

Romanian composer

Diamandi Gheciu (20 April 1892 in Bucharest – 1 October 1982, Bucharest) was a Romanian composer.

== Selected works, editions and recordings ==
- Gheciu: "Si daca", on Angela Gheorghiu with Jeff Cohen (pianist) - Live from La Scala - song recital EMI 2007
