= Adrian Vernon Fish =

British composer and broadcaster (born 1956)

Adrian Vernon Fish in studio at Erris FM

Adrian Vernon Fish, GRSM (Hons): ARCM: FIBA: Winston Churchill Fellow (born 20 January 1956) is a composer, broadcaster and Greenland cultural explorer. He lives in the rural land of Erris in County Mayo, Ireland. Adrian broadcasts on Erris-FM where he produces two shows Fish on Fridays where he discusses the stories behind the composers and music and The Venue - a magazine arts show.

By the age of 21, Fish had composed over 200 works and subsequently destroyed them one autumn in 1977. He has since brought his output of work up to over 200 again, including twelve symphonies, organ music, cantatas and cabaret songs.

== Early life and education ==
Adrian Vernon Fish was born in Bristol, the only son of Harold Alfred Christopher Fish and Freda Jagger. Both his parents were deeply involved in local amateur operatic societies, and Adrian was taken in his carry-cot to many rehearsals and performances. At the age of four, he was allowed to stand backstage at a performance of Gilbert and Sullivan's The Gondoliers. It was at that event that Fish determined to become a composer. Fish started piano lessons with Gwyneth Maine shortly after starting school at Westbury-on-Trym Church of England Primary School in Bristol. At the age of seven, he won an award in the Bristol Eisteddfod. At the age of ten, Fish was sent as a boarder to Queen Elizabeth's Hospital, Bristol's famed “Bluecoat” school, on a foundation scholarship. There was no music making at the school, except for an elderly piano teacher who visited once a week to give lessons. At age eleven, Fish found himself appointed school organist. The first hymn he had to play on the school's old organ was “Judge Eternal, throned in splendour,” to the tune Rhuddlan. He remained school organist until he left at age seventeen.

In 1967, the school appointed a new music teacher, Peter Fowler. It was Fowler who built up a tradition of music-making at QEH, and Fish found himself central to the growth of the music department. It was only now that he started composing seriously. Until this time, he had turned out over a thousand hymn-tunes of the sort he had grown up with, but his enthusiasm remained unchannelled and unguided. The school's new choir performed at concerts, Carol Services, Speech Days and Founder's Days, always with Fish at either the organ or piano. When neither instrument was involved, Fish played timpani or trombone in the school orchestra. He now took organ lessons with Garth Benson at St. Mary Redcliffe Church, and later with Gary Desmond at the City Church. In 1973, the QEH Choir toured Denmark and Sweden, with Fish as organist. This was his first experience of the North European organ tradition. He left school with an A in music A-level and spent a year at Dartington College of Arts, Devon, where he honed his skills as a composer, having fallen under the influence of the Avant-Garde of the time. He continued to study the organ, now with John Wellingham at Dartington.

Following a year during which Fish worked as an organ-tuner's assistant with Hele and Company, of Saltash, Cornwall, he entered the Royal College of Music. Under the tutelage of Alan Ridout, and guided by Herbert Howells, he abandoned his compositional style by destroying all his work to date. His life's output was burned in the back yard of his basement flat in London's Lavender Hill. Following Howells’ advice: “Write what is in your heart, my boy,” he began afresh, presenting a Symphony for Organ on the Plainsong hymn Pange Lingua for his final portfolio, later orchestrating the work as his Symphony no 1. Fish obtained an Associateship of the Royal Schools of Music (ARCM) as an organist in 1977, and graduated with honours (GRSM hons) in 1978.

== Career ==
In the late spring of 1978, Fish was appointed composer-in-residence to a dance-in-education group based in Lancaster. On arriving in September, newly married to Margaret Crichton, a violin teacher, and daughter of a director of the John Jameson Distillery in Dublin, Ireland, he was informed that his new job had been axed. Seven months later, his wife's peripatetic teaching post was also axed. She was then appointed violin teacher for North Cornwall, and in August 1979, the Fishes moved to North Petherwin, between Launceston and Bude. Fish found himself teaching piano at St Petroc's School in Bude. On the birth of his son Patrick in 1982, Fish became Head of Music at Lucton School, Herefordshire, and the couple moved to Presteigne, just across the Welsh border in Powys. Whilst in Presteigne, Fish was on the founding committee of the Presteigne International Festival. His seventeen-hour performance of Erik Satie's “Vexations” with co-pianist Dawn Pye made headlines around the world in July 1983. Due to difficulties in selling their home, the Fishes returned to Cornwall, moving to Tavistock, Devon in 1984.

Fish became a broadcaster in 1986, presenting a music feature on a breakfast magazine programme for Plymouth Sound. He took over control of the programme in 1989, but was forced to resign in 1990, in order to devote more time to his work as a composer. Fish continued to compose until 2001, working occasionally as a freelance radio presenter. His career was put on hold in 2001 when he and his wife parted company. Three weeks after the separation, Adrian suffered a burst cerebral aneurysm. Whilst recovering in Derriford Hospital and later at Tavistock Hospital, he determined to prove to himself that he was still able to compose, and wrote an unaccompanied setting of the mass. He completed the work at home some months later.
From 2001 to 2003, Fish lived variously in Devon, Powys and Kilkenny, Ireland. He bought a remote cottage in Ballycroy, County Mayo in 2003, where he still lives. During 2006 and 2007, Fish wrote “The Utterly Unreliable A-Z of Music.” (publ: Kevin Mayhew Ltd. 2008). In August 2008, he married mezzo-soprano Margaret Probyn in Chinnor, Oxfordshire. Fish's composing comes with difficulty now. He continues to keep his hand in as a broadcaster, initially with RTE LyricFM, and, since 2007, with his local station ErrisFM. He is a member of The Performing Right Society and The British Academy of Songwriters, Composers and Authors.

== The Greenland Connection (Kalaallit Nunaannut Atassuteqaat) ==
Fish has had a fascination for Greenland since the 1970s. For ten years he corresponded with Greenland fisherman and hunter Thomas (Tuuma) Frederiksen, finally visiting Greenland in 1991 for a series of organ recitals. Frederiksen had unfortunately died a few months prior to Fish's visit, but he has kept an intensely close relationship with the world's northernmost land. He undertook ten further concert tours.
In 1995 he was awarded a prestigious Winston Churchill Fellowship to enable him to continue his work in Greenland. Fish gave the first classical recital in Greenland's new Katuaq Cultural Centre in December 1997. In most of his recitals, he has shared his performances with local choirs, from Narsaq in the far south, to Qaanaaq in the polar north. He has been able to take other musicians with him on three occasions: 1998 – Rosemary Turner (soprano); 2002 - Charles Luxford (bass-baritone); 2004 – Genevieve Usher (soprano). In 1995 he was awarded his second Greenland Government Culture Fund Award, to enable him to take his second son Michael. Greenland's premier Jonathan Motzfeldt called Fish “a rational voice on Greenland’s behalf”.

Back in Ireland, Adrian has lectured throughout the country on the subject of Greenland, its traditions and culture, most especially to primary school children, under the auspices of the Heritage Council's “Heritage in Schools Scheme”. Greenland is a recurring and significant theme in Fish's body of work, as evidenced by the titles of numerous compositions.

In 2016, Fish completed the first of what he intends will be a three-volume set of his Greenlandic memoirs.

== Music ==
Fish has been somewhat prolific as a composer. He has written music in a variety of styles throughout his career. He has never considered with any seriousness, purity of style. He admits that it would be difficult to hear a work and say “That’s a piece of Fish.” His first composition, a hymn tune, was written when he was seven years old. Up until the time he left school, he composed little except hundreds of hymn-tunes, all of which he has since destroyed. While a student at Dartington in the early 1970s, he fell under the spell of the avant-gardists, and he turned out many works in graphic form. But it was only after talking with Alan Ridout and Herbert Howells in 1977, that Fish built a bonfire of all his scores, determined to start again. He admits he cried for days, but has also said that it was the most sensible thing he ever did. His new output became simpler, and throughout the years he has simplified his style more and more. In 1986, he composed a series of cabaret songs, poking fun at those who visit, destroy, drop bombs or litter on Dartmoor, an area close to Fish's heart. Ten years later, after a passing comment from soprano Rosemary Turner, a second series of songs emerged, about Cornwall, entitled “Gorse and Gorsedd”. Fish had worked as Rosemary Turner's accompanist throughout the 1990s and they presented many themed, costumed concerts, two of which they toured Greenland with in 1998. Throughout the 1990s, Fish composed and edited much music for publisher Kevin Mayhew. Fish composed prolifically until his aneurysm in 2001. He was advised to “go somewhere quiet to live”. His current home is close beside the Ballycroy National Park on the shore of Blacksod Bay, in West County Mayo. Since his aneurysm, he struggles to compose, occasionally completing new pieces.

== Personal life ==
Fish has been married twice. He married Catherine Margaret Crichton (born 3 December 1954) in Beltra, County Sligo, Ireland, in August 1978, for which ceremony Alan Ridout composed some of the music. They have two children, Patrick Christopher Vernon Fish (born 26 February 1982), now a fibre-optics engineer living in The Wirral, and Michael Alan Fish (born 22 September 1991), now an actor based in Aberystwyth, Wales (www.mikefishactor.com). In 2001, Fish and his wife divorced. In August 2008, he married Margaret Ann Norton (née Probyn). He has two grandchildren, Isobelle and Marcus.

== Selected compositions ==
- Symphony “Pange Lingua” Organ (1978)
- Symphony no 1 Orchestra (1978)
- Symphony no 2 “A Little Orkney Symphony” Tenor and orchestra (1979–80).
- Sequentia in honorem Sancti Iusti Filius Regis Gerontii Flute/piccolo, organ and narrator (1979)
- St Petroc Sonata Piano (1980)
- Kalaallit Nunaat Organ (1980)
- Christ at the Cheesewring Cantata for baritone, chorus, strings and percussion (1981)
- When Stars invade the Dusk Ten songs for children (1982)
- Elegy Solo bass clarinet (1982)
- Septem verba Organ (1982)
- Vigilia Eight meditations for trumpet and organ (1983)
- Symphony no 3 “Ilulissat” 3 oboes, 2 horns, piano, strings and percussion (1983)
- Symphony no 4 “Oqaluttuat Misigisallu” Baritone solo, male speaker, mixed chorus, wind sextet, large brass quire and large orchestra (including organ) (1984)
- Sarqarlit Rhapsody for flute and piano (1984)
- Oferen Gernewek Vyghan (A Little Cornish Mass) SATB soli, double choir and solo bassoon (1984)
- Three Trifles Three light-hearted pieces for violin and piano (1984)
- Elegy Solo viola (1984)
- Metamorphoses after Mathias Brass quintet (1984)
- Symphony no 5 “Trisagion” Chamber ensemble (1984)
- Dark Infinities Chamber ensemble (1984)
- The Well Cantata for soprano, flute/alto flute, bass clarinet and metallic percussion (1985)
- Moraine Chamber Concerto (1985)
- Cantata in memoriam Patrick Howlett A cappella choir (1986)
- Black Rock, Blackthorn Chamber ensemble (1986)
- Symphony no 6 “Ordulf” Orchestra (1986)
- A Garland for Samuel and Son (Wesleyana) Orchestra (1986)
- Concertante Variations on an Icelandic Melody Orchestra (1986)
- Le Tombeau de Clerambault Organ (1986)
- Hawker Chamber opera for bass and ensemble (1986)
- November Preludes Piano (1986)
- Sonata Cello solo (1987)
- The Grey Guardians Bass baritone, contrabassoon and 2 percussionists (1987)
- Oqaitsut Vibraphone (1987)
- Shout for joy before the Lord Fanfare-anthem for choir and organ (1987)
- A Dartmoor Cabaret Voice and Piano (1987)
- Symphony no 7 Small Orchestra (1988)
- Symphony no 8 “Maigh Eo” Small orchestra and chamber choir (1988)
- Veni Sancte Spiritus Choir and organ (1989)
- Symphony no 9 “Granite State” Orchestra (1989)
- Symphony 10 “A Little Christmas Symphony” Trumpet, bells and strings (1989)
- Agiochook Piano (1989)
- Symphony no 11 Solo trombone, baritone, chorus, celesta, synth, strings and recorded sounds (1990)
- The Clothed Leaves Song cycle for mezzo-soprano and piano (1990)
- Greenlandic Dances Clarinet, cello and piano (1991)
- Concertino “Arsarnerit” Clarinet and piano (1992)
- 12 Preludes on Greenlandic Hymns Organ (1992)
- Aasiaat Cantata on themes of Peter Olsen Choir and organ or orchestra (1994)
- Kitsissuarsuit Piano (1995)
- The Forgotten Whalers of Kitsissuarsuit Organ (1995)
- Seqerngup kaviinnarfia Organ (1995)
- Cnoc na Ria Sonata for Harp (1995)
- Gorse and Gorsedd Cabaret songs for voice and piano (1996)
- The Longing of Liádain Mezzo-soprano, vibraphone, alto saxophone, trombone and strings (1996)
- Kaperlak String Quartet no 1 (1996)
- In Paradisum Choir, harp, 3 flutes and strings (1996)
- Distant Mountain Solo trumpet (1996)
- Symphony no 12 “Ajoqinnguaq” Wind, harp, percussion and recorded drumsong (1996)
- Nanok Harpsichord (1997)
- Iorras: A Mayo Concerto Small orchestra including Uilleann pipes (1997)
- Prelude and Fugue Percussion Quintet (1997)
- From Ochre Heavens Song cycle for soprano, flute, vibraphone and piano (1998)
- Sermitsiaq String Trio (1998)
- Naalagaq tarnima naalannartippaa Greenlandic Magnificat for choir, organ, brass and timpani (1998)
- Meditation and Jhala Sitar, Tabla, Natavungam and organ (1998)
- Sonata “Qaanaaq” Viola and piano (2000)
- Unnummi erinarsortut String Quartet no 2 (2000)
- Toccata Cello and piano (2000)
- An Erris Mass A Capella choir (2001)
- Ukiap seqerna pukkilissoq Greenlandic songs, arr for choir and orchestra (2002)
- Akunnaaq Piano Trio (2002)
- Of cats, vinegar and World War III Bass-baritone and piano (2002)
- O’Donoghue's Dozen 13 little Erris jazz pieces for piano (2006)
- Levavi oculos Psalm-sonata for mezzo-soprano and organ (2008)
- Kassoq Ice-partita for bassoon and organ (2012)

== Books ==
The Utterly Unreliable A-Z of Music (2007) (publ: Kevin Mayhew 2008)

Tulussuaq (2016)

== Recordings ==
Adrian Vernon Fish has always been reluctant to allow his works to be recorded, maintaining a deep-held view that music should always be live. However, a change of heart in the last few years has seen a few recordings appear.

CANTILENA for oboe and organ Trio Concertante, Zürich. Unda Maris 101. CD title: “Just a Moment”

OFEREN GERNEWEK VYGHAN A Little Cornish Mass Benjamin Coelho (bassoon), University of Iowa Kantorei / Timothy Stalter. MSR Classics. MS1407 CD title: Agnus Dei
