= Michel François Hoguet =

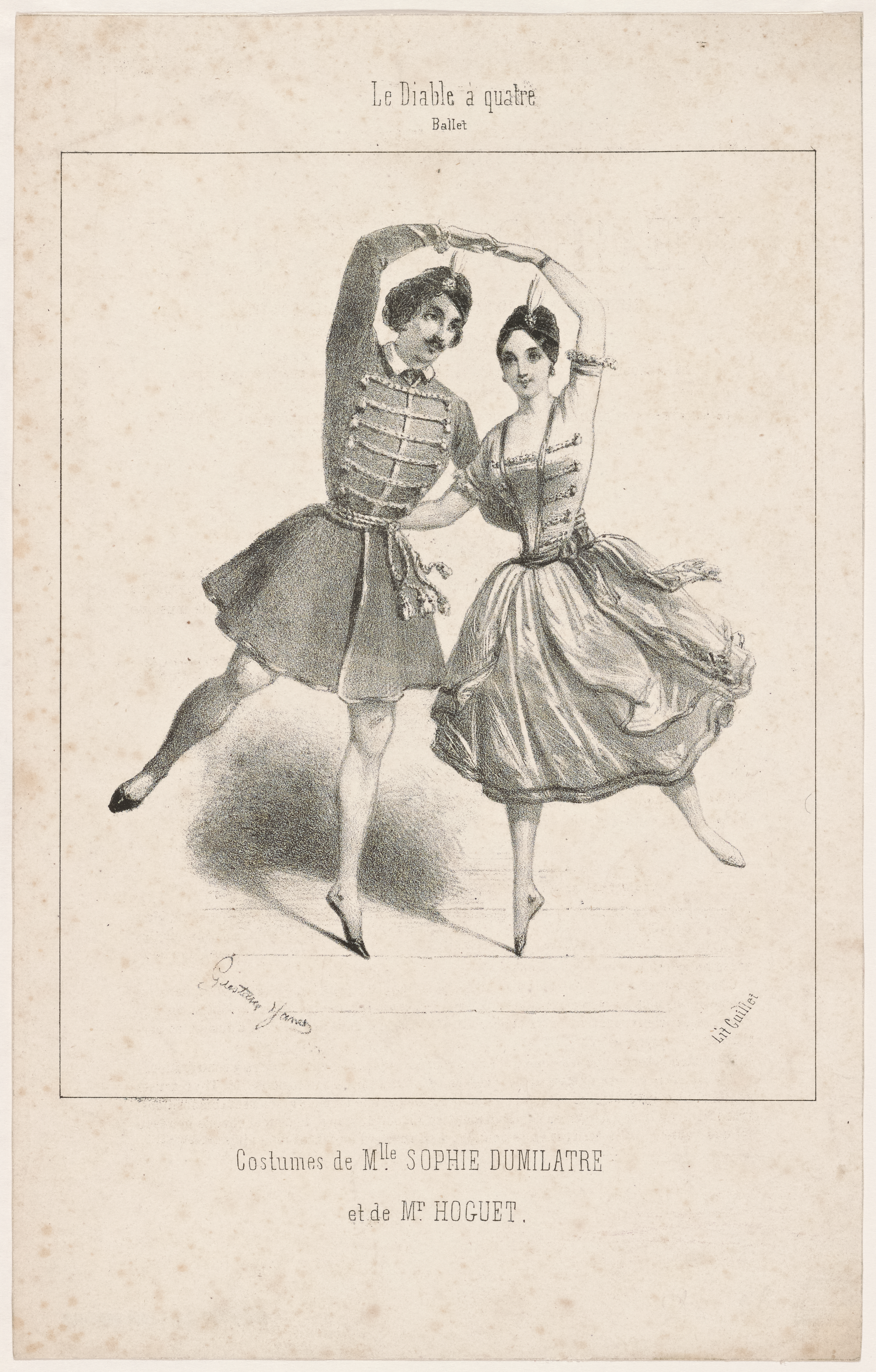
Hoguet on left, Dumilâtre on right; both on pointe, arms around each other's waist.

Michel François Hoguet (French pronunciation: [miʃɛl fʁɑ̃swa ɔɡɛ]; 17 June 1793 in Paris – 5 April 1871 in Berlin) was a French ballet dancer, ballet master and choreographer at the Royal Berlin Theater, where he worked from 1817 until 1823 as first solo dancer. From 1834-1838 he was a full-time ballet master and in this position he was then active in Berlin until 1856. During the Revolution of 1848 he was publicly attacked because of his royalist sentiments. In 1856 he watched the increasing popularity of his younger colleague Paul Taglioni, which was his last act as ballet master, retiring from the stage thereafter.

== Family ==
Michel François Hoguet was the son of a watchmaker. In 1821 he married the actress and dancer Emilie Caroline Vestris (1801–1869) and had two sons and a daughter, including the solo dancer Louis Hoguet-Vestris (1825–1900) and the actress Mathilde, whose married name was Frey (1833–1878).
