= Oscar van Hemel =

Dutch-Belgian violinist (1892–1981)

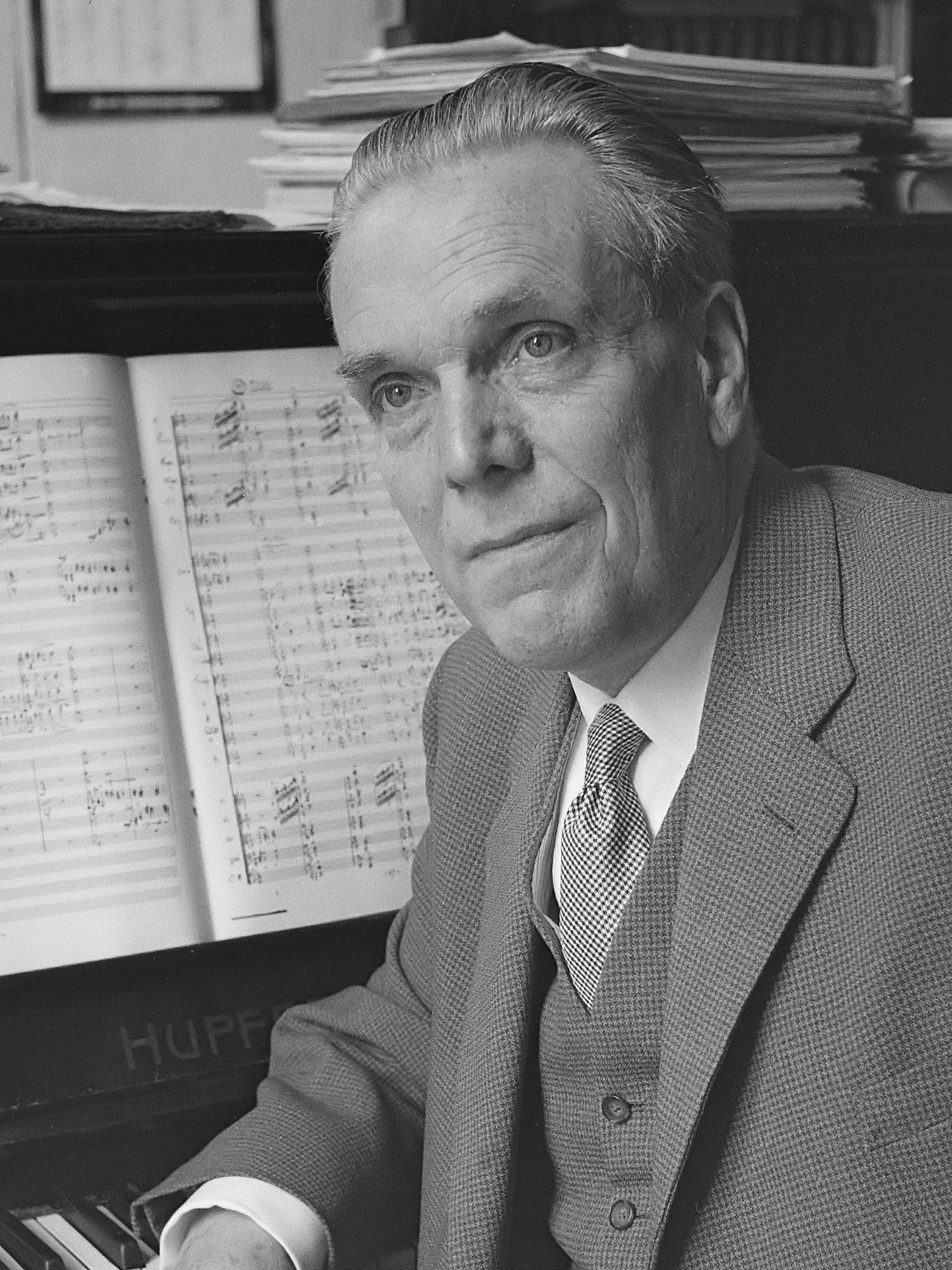
- Oscar van Hemel (1962)
- Born: 3 August 1892; Antwerp, Belgium
- Died: 9 July 1981 (aged 88); Hilversum, Netherlands
- Education: Royal Conservatoire of Antwerp
- Spouse: Anna Johanna (Anneke) Wouters
- Children: 6 daughters, 4 sons

Oscar van Hemel (3 August 1892 – 9 July 1981) was a Dutch-Belgian violinist, music teacher and composer of contemporary classical music. His work includes two operas and symphonies.

== Life and education ==
Van Hemel was born in 1892 in Antwerp, Belgium, where he studied with August de Boeck and Lodewijk Mortelmans at the Royal Conservatoire of Antwerp. During World War I he was wounded at the Battle of Halen. With the help of the Red Cross, he fled in May 1915 to Roosendaal in the Netherlands during the bombardment of Antwerp. He subsequently played violin in the orchestra of the Dutch National Opera in Amsterdam.

In 1918 he moved to Bergen op Zoom, where he became a teacher of violin, piano, and music theory at the municipal music school. Here, he also met his future wife, Annie Wouters, whom he married in August 1923. Together they eventually had 10 children. From 1931 to 1933 he studied music composition with Willem Pijper in Rotterdam. In 1949, van Hemel and his family moved to Hilversum, where the Katholieke Radio Omroep (Catholic Radio Broadcasting) commissioned an opera, Viviane on a libretto by Louis Lutz, to celebrate its 25th jubilee.

== Works and reception ==
Van Hemel composed chamber music, sacred music, songs and choral music, music for orchestra, including symphonies, and for concert band, and two operas, Viviane and De prostituée (The Prostitute).

Van Hemel's music was at times praised as "lovely" and spontaneous, albeit at times "constructed". His Pianokwartet was praised as "powerful, quirky interbellum music". Others were more critical and lamented a lack of originality. Nevertheless, in the 1950s, van Hemel's music was very popular in the Netherlands.

In 1962, van Hemel received the ANV-Visser Neerlandiaprijs for his Quartetto di strumenti ad arco no. 6. In the same year, he was knighted in the Order of Orange-Nassau.
