= Olga Hans =

Polish composer and music educator (born 1971)

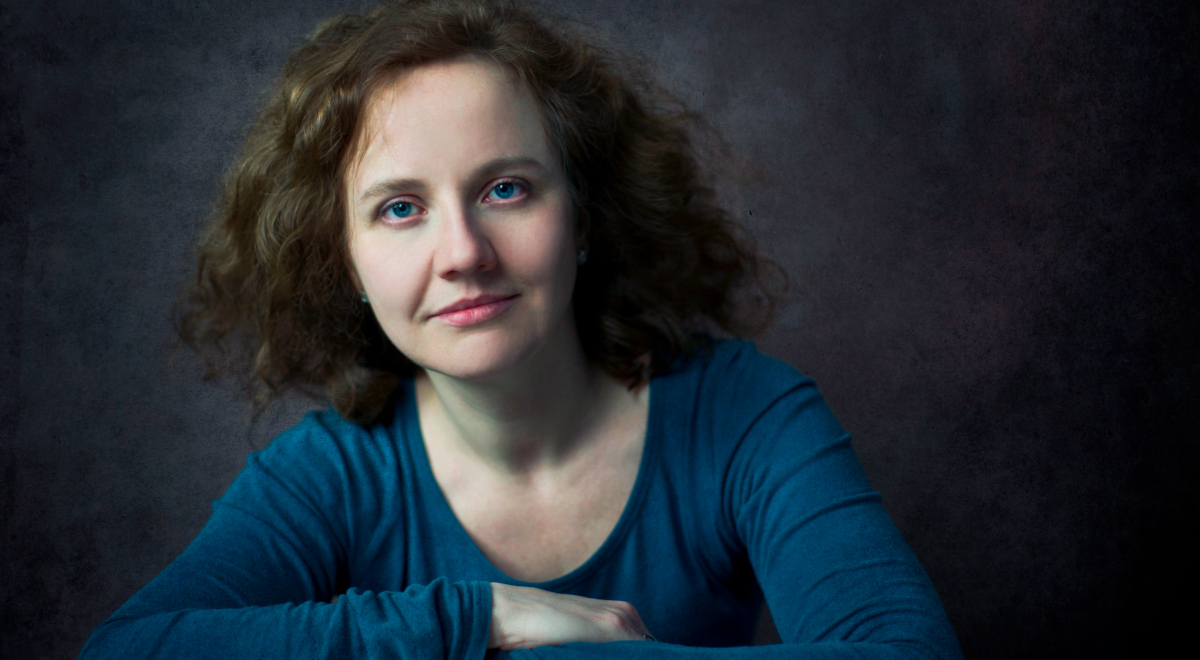
Olga Hans

Olga Hans (born 30 May 1971) is a Polish composer and music educator.

== Background ==
Olga Hans was born in Pabianice and studied at the Academy of Music in Łódź receiving diplomas with distinction in 1995 and 1997. She studied music theory with Francis Wesolowski and composition with George Bauer. After graduating, she took a position as assistant professor at the Faculty of Composition, Music Theory, Rhythm and Art Education at the Music Academy in Łódź.

Hans is a prizewinner in several composition competitions. In 1997 she won third prize for Fantasy for solo guitar (1994) at the Third National Composition Competition for Classical Guitar in Tychy. In 2004 she won the International Young Composers' Competition Musica Sacra in Czestochowa and in 2004 the Fifth Ladislav Kubik International Prize in Composition. Her compositions have been performed at music festivals in Poland, the Netherlands, Spain and Great Britain. She is a member of the Polish Composers' Union.

== Selected works ==
- Preludium for piano (1992)
- Koniugacja for mezzo-soprano and piano (1992); words by Halina Poświatowska
- Elegia (Elegy) for cello and piano (1993)
- Dwie miniatury (2 Miniatures) for string trio (1993)
- Barwna droga for percussion ensemble (1994)
- Dialogi (Dialogues) for 2 violas (1994)
- Improwizacja (Improvisation) for solo flute (1994)
- Fantazja (Fantasy) for solo guitar (1994)
- Trio na instrumenty stroikowe (Trio for Reed Instruments) (1995)
- Wersy (Verses) for string quartet (1996)
- Da suonare a tre for viola, cello and piano (1996)
- Concertino da camera for violin, cello and string orchestra (1996)
- Cantus, Chorale Fantasy for symphony orchestra (1997)
- Concerto for violin and orchestra (1997)
- Dialogi 2 (Dialogues 2) for viola and cello (1997)
- Capriccio for violin and piano (1998)
- String Quartet No. 2 (1998)
- Divertimento for string orchestra (1998)
- Sonata in modo antico for brass quintet (1999)
- Lullaby for brass quintet (1999)
- Pieśni słoneczne (Songs of the Sun) for cello ensemble (1999)
- Ragtime for brass quintet (2000)
- Intermezzo, Adagio for string quartet (2000)
- Epigraf (Epigraph) for alto flute solo (2000)
- Psalm (wg Cypriana Bazylika) (Psalm according to the Basilica of St. Cyprian) for mixed choir (2000)
- Trzy psalmy staropolskie (3 Old Polish Psalms) for mixed choir a cappella (2000, 2005)
- Da suonare a tre for violin, cello and piano (2001)
- Sonores for flute, cello and guitar (2001)
- Elegia (Elegy) for violin and orchestra (2001)
- Litaniae de Beatae Mariae Virginis for mezzo-soprano and organ (2002)
- Lullaby for M. for piano quintet (2002)
- Dwie melodie (2 Melodies) for violin and piano (2003)
- String Quartet No. 3 (2003)
- Litania (Litany) for mixed chorus a cappella (2003)
- Sequentia dla Prof. F. Wesołowskiego w dniu 90. rocznicy urodzin (Sequentia for Professor F. Wesołowski on His 90th Birthday) for strings and organ (2004)
- Sonata for solo cello (2004)
- Locus solus for cello octet (2004)
- Tęcza (Rainbow) for children's chorus (2004)
- Musica anniversaria for 4 trumpets, 3 trombones and tuba (2004)
- Thyrsos for percussion, 3 trumpets, 2 horns and 2 trombones (2004)
- String Quartet No. 4 (2004)
- Miniatura (Miniatures) for cello and piano (2006)
