= Morten Gaathaug =

Norwegian musician and composer

- Born: April 20, 1955; Norway
- Genres: Contemporary classical, Norwegian folk-influenced
- Occupations: Composer, pianist, music critic
- Instrument: Piano
- Years active: 1980s–present

Morten Gaathaug (born 20 April 1955) is a Norwegian contemporary composer of orchestral works, solo pieces, chamber music, and concertos. His work is influenced by the classics, Norwegian folk music, and contemporary composers.

== Career ==
Gaathaug studied at the Barratt Due Institute of Music in Oslo where he followed composition classes with Johan Kvandal and piano classes with Kari Edgren Gierløff. He was a Slovak State Stipend recipient and studied at the Bratislava Music Academy in 1981-82 with teachers Eva Fischerová (piano) and Vladimír Bokes (composition). Currently Gaathaug teaches piano at the Kontra culture school in Ski and he has also been active as a music critic in Drammens Tidende and Aftenposten.

Gaathaug produced more than 100 works in a variety of genres, including orchestral works, solo pieces, chamber music as well as songs and concertos for trumpet and oboe, a De profundis (García Lorca) for mezzo-soprano and orchestra plus a concertino for accordion and orchestra. In his compositions 24 fugleportretter, De tapte fuglers verden and Ornis musicalis, the composer utilizes bird song in his music. As well as international music, Gaathaug has devoted much time to focus on Norwegian folk music, which in turn has influenced his own compositions.

Gaathaug served for two years on the board of Ny Musikk (the Norwegian section of the International Society for Contemporary Music) and two years on the board of the Norwegian Society of Composers. In 1978, Gaathaug founded The Norwegian Prokofiev Society – an organisation whose aim is to promote Prokofiev’s music in Norway. He has also advocated for renewed public interest in the music of female Norwegian composer Borghild Holmsen (1865–1938).

== Works ==
=== Selected works ===
- Konsert for fagott og orkester, op. 106 (2016)
- Alla Siciliano (2015)
- Fem sanger til dikt av J. S. Welhaven, op. 103 (2015)
- Sekstett nr. 2 : For strykere, op. 101 (2015)
- Ornis musicalis (2013)
- 24 fugleportretter (2012)
- Fantasia Concertante (2011)
- De tapte fuglers verden (2007)
- Concertino for akkordeon og orkester : In memoriam Johan Kvandal (2002)
- Konsert for obo og orkester (1994)
- De profundis (1982)

=== Discography ===
- Musica da Camera (2007)
- Terje Bjørn Lerstad, Tore Dingstad, Lyrical Punk Clarinet (2002)
- Duo Novo, Roy Henning Snyen, Torolf Mørk Karlsen, Outside – inside (2001)
- Chamber Music (1997)
- Øystein Baadsvik, Hindemith• Madsen • Gaathaug (1993)
- Tore Dingstad Portrait of a Composer - Morten Gaathaug (1990)
