= Hélène-Frédérique de Faye-Jozin =

French composer

Hélène-Frédérique de Faye-Jozin (22 February 1871 – 30 January 1942) was a French composer. She was born in Saint Brieuc and died in Côtes-d'Armor.

== Works ==
Selected works include:

- 1906 Cantilène, Opus 30, duo
- 1922 Suite Sylvestre, suite
- 1925 Mirage, duo
- 1931 Solo de Concert, cello concerto
- 1934 Contre une vielle, canon
- 1936 Cyprès, Fontaines et Lauriers, duo.
