= Wenzel Gährich =

German composer and violinist

Wenzel Gährich (16 September 1794 in Cerhovice, Bohemia – 15 September 1864 in Berlin) was a German violinist and composer. Gährich composed numerous ballets, especially for Michel François Hoguet and Paul Taglioni. He was the Royal Ballet-music conductor in Berlin.

== Selected works ==
Ballet

- Der Seeräuber (Berlin 1838, Wien 1854); choreography by Paul Taglioni
- Don Quixote (Berlin c.1839); choreography by Paul Taglioni
- Die Insel der Liebe, oder Das unausführbare Gesetz (Berlin 1844); choreography by Paul Taglioni
- Die unterbrochene Hochzeit (Berlin 1845); choreography by François Michel Hoguet
- Paul und Virginie (premiered Berlin, 10 March 1848); choreography by François Michel Hoguet after Pierre Gardel
- Aladin, oder Die Wunderlampe (Berlin 1854); choreography by François Michel Hoguet
- Die Weiberkur (Berlin); choreography by Adolphe Adam

Other stage works

- 100,000 Thaler!, Farce with Songs (Berlin 1848); words by David Kalisch
- Tafellied zum siebzehnten August achtzehnhundertfuenfundfuenfzig (Berlin 1855)
- Jubelkantate zum siebzehnten August achtzehnhundertfuenfundfuenfzig (Berlin 1855)
- Ein Landstand, Vaudeville (Berlin); words by A. Heinrich v. H. Michaelson
- Der verliebte Dorfschneider, Divertissement (Berlin); words by Toni Stullmüller

Instrumental music

- Sinfonie No. 1 in E♭ major (pub. 1831)
- Concertino in G minor for viola and orchestra, Op. 2 (1831)
- Symphony No. 2 in D major, Op. 3 (pub. 1831)
- Piano Quartet in C minor, Op. 4 (pub. 1833)
- Rondo und Variationen (c.1841)
