= Bassoon sonata =

Larger-scale work for bassoon

6 Bassoon Sonatas by Johann Ernst Galliard

A bassoon sonata is a larger-scale work for bassoon, usually with keyboard accompaniment. Most bassoon sonatas are substantial, multi-movement works, often based on Classical sonata form. Bassoon sonatinas, by comparison, tend to be shorter works, often in a single movement. Like bassoon concertos, bassoon sonatas were relatively uncommon until the twentieth century, at which point they became plentiful. During the twentieth century, the term bassoon sonata came to denote a wider range of works, including sonatas for solo bassoon and sonatas for bassoon in various duets with other instruments (such as cello or oboe).

== Baroque ==
- Giovanni Antonio Bertoli, nine sonatas (1645)
- Philipp Friedrich Böddecker, Sonata sopra "La Monica" (1651)
- Joseph Bodin de Boismortier, various sonatas (1730s)
- Johann Friedrich Fasch, Sonata in C (authorship uncertain)
- Johann Ernst Galliard, six sonatas for bassoon or cello (1733)
- Luigi Merci, six sonatas for bassoon or cello, Op. 3 (c. 1735)
- Georg Philipp Telemann, Two Sonatas (F minor (1728) and E minor)

== Classical ==
- Johann Andreas Amon, Sonata Concertante in F major, Op. 88
- François Devienne, six sonatas (1788?)
- Miguel de Lope, Sonata for bassoon and continuo (1791)
- Wolfgang Amadeus Mozart, Sonata for Bassoon and Cello in B♭ major, K. 292 (1775)
- Etienne Ozi, various sonatas
- Anton Reicha, Sonata in B♭, Op. Posth.

== Romantic ==
- Johannes Meinardus Coenen, Sonata in C minor (c. 1864)
- William Hurlstone, Sonata in F major (1904)
- Anton Liste, Sonata, Op. 3 (c. 1822)
- Josef Matern Marx, Sonata (c. 1830)
- Julius Röntgen, Sonata in A♭ minor (1929)
- Camille Saint-Saëns, Sonata in G major, Op. 168 (1921)
- Gustav Schreck, Sonata in E♭, Op. 9 (1887)

== 20th century ==
- Harri Ahmas, Sonata (1981)
- Eduardo Alemann, Sonatina, Op. 72, No. 2 (1957)
- Jurriaan Andriessen, Sonata (1989)
- Susana Antón, Sonatina
- Hans Erich Apostel, Sonata, Op. 19, No. 3 for solo bassoon (1951)
- Violet Archer, Sonatina (1978), Sonata (1980)
- Edward Arteaga, Sonata (1993)
- Vyacheslav Artyomov, Sunday Sonata (1977)
- Boaz Avni, Sonata (1996)
- Robert Baksa, Sonata (1991, rev. 2005)
- Teimuraz Bakuradze, Sonata (1965)
- Hanna Beekhuis, Sonatina (1948)
- Richard Rodney Bennett, Sonata (1999)
- Niels Viggo Bentzon, Sonata, Op. 316 (1972)
- Olav Berg, Sonatine (1995)
- Antonio Bibalo, Sonata (1991)
- Willem Frederik Bon, Sonata for bassoon solo, Op. 32 (1970)
- Andries de Braal, Sonatina (1966)
- Algimantas Bražinskas, Sonatina (1958)
- Victor Bruns, Three Sonatas, Op. 20 (1952), 45 (1969) and 86 (1988)
- David DeBoor Canfield, Sonata (1987)
- Romeo Cascarino, Sonata (1950)
- Mario Castelnuovo-Tedesco, Sonatina, Op. 130 (1946)
- Barney Childs, Sonata (1964)
- Arnold Cooke, Sonata (1988)
- Jean Coulthard, Lyric Sonatina (1970)
- Michael Cunningham, Parisian Sonata, Op. 72 (1981)
- Paulas Dambis, Sonata (1979)
- William D. Davis, Sonata (1969)
- Edison Denisov, Sonata for solo bassoon (1982)
- Pierre Max Dubois, Sonatine Tango (1984)
- Horst Ebenhöh, Sonatine, Op. 47/4 for bassoon solo (1987)
- Helmut Eder, Sonatina, Op. 34/3 (1963)
- Benzion Eliezer, Sonata (1969)
- Willard Somers Elliot, Sonata (1998)
- Iván Erőd, Sonata Milanese, Op. 47 (1985)
- Alvin Etler, Sonata (1951)
- Eberhard Eyser, Sonata for bassoon solo (1973)
- Ferenc Farkas, Sonatina Based on Hungarian Folk Songs for double bass, cello or bassoon and piano (1955); Sonate Romantique (1985)
- Heinrich Feischner, Sonatina (c1936)
- Jindřich Feld, Sonatine (1969)
- Bjørn Fongaard, Three Sonatas, Op. 109, No. 1 (1971) and Op. 125, Nos. 14 and 15 (1973); Sonatina, Op. 126, No. 17
- Cláudio de Freitas, Sonata (1998)
- Merab Gagnidze, Sonata for bassoon solo; Sonata for bassoon and timpani
- Anatoli Garšnek, Sonatina (1974)
- Odette Gartenlaub, Sonatine (1959)
- Serge de Gastyne, Sonatina, Op. 58 (1972)
- Harald Genzmer, Sonata for bassoon solo (1974)
- Glenn Gould, Sonata (1950)
- Eduardo Grau, Sonata (1969)
- Czesław Grudziński, Sonata No. 2 (1984)
- Sofia Gubaidulina, Duo Sonata for two bassoons (1977)
- Truman Harris, Sonata Breve, Sonata for two bassoons and piano
- Anthony Hedges, Fantasy Sonata, Op. 104 (1986)
- Lennart Hedwall, Sonata for bassoon solo (1977)
- Paul Hindemith, Sonata (1938)
- Alan Hovhaness, Sonata for two bassoons (1977); Sonata for oboe and bassoon, Op. 302 (1979)
- Bertold Hummel, Sonatina (1976)
- Yuri Kasparov, Sonata-Infernale for solo bassoon (1989)
- Kjell Mørk Karlsen, Choral Sonata No. 2, Op. 13, No. 2 (1971)
- Ulysses Kay, Sonata (1941)
- Homer Keller, Sonata (1955)
- Brian Kershner, Sonata (1989)
- Valeri Kikta, Sonata No. 1 (1977); Sonata No. 2 (1979)
- Ron Klimko, Sonata (1997)
- Charles Koechlin, Sonata, Op. 71 (1918)
- Ellis Kohs, Sonata (1953)
- Serge Lancen, Sonatine (1983)
- Terje Bjørn Lerstad, Sonata, Op. 192 (1989)
- David Loeb, Two Sonatas for solo bassoon (1975, 1990)
- Otto Luening, Sonata (1970)
- Juliusz Łuciuk, Sonata (1954)
- Ivar Lunde, Sonata, Op. 78 (1982)
- Mathieu Lussier, "White Rock" Sonata, Op. 28
- Trygve Madsen, Sonata, Op. 25
- Ernst Mahle, Sonata (1969), Sonatina (1974)
- Pierrette Mari, Sonatine (1964)
- Władysława Markiewiczówna, Sonatina (1954)
- Henri Martelli, Sonata, Op. 50 (1960)
- Arnold Matz, Sonatine (1987)
- Brady McElligot, Sonata (1982)
- Georges Migot, Sonate en quatre mouvements pour basson seul (1953)
- Marcel Mihalovici, Sonata (1958)
- Isaac Mikhnovsky, Sonata (1978)
- John Mitchell, Sonata, Op. 36 (1979)
- Oskar Morawetz, Sonata (1981)
- Herman Mulder, Sonata No. 5 (1944)
- Nicolas Nabokov, Sonata (1941)
- Ray Næssén, Sonata Divina
- Vaclav Nelhybel, Sonata da Chiesa No. 3 "Variations on 'Our God Almighty'" for trombone, bassoon or oboe and organ (1977)
- Lazar Nikolov, Sonata (1976)
- Aleksandar Obradović, Mikrosonata II for bassoon solo (1971)
- Ivo Petrić, Sonata (1954)
- Wolfgang Plagge, Three Sonatas, Op. 43 (1989/90), Op. 74 (1993) and Op. 123 (2007)
- Francis Poulenc, Sonata for clarinet and bassoon (1922)
- Graham Powning, Sonata for two bassoons
- Gerhard Präsent, Erödiana (Capriccio Erödico) for bassoon (or cello) and piano (1996), for Iván Erőd
- André Previn, Sonata (1999)
- Salvador Ranieri, Sonatina (c. 1990)
- Einojuhani Rautavaara, Sonata, Op. 26 (1970)
- Verne Reynolds, Sonata
- Alan Ridout, Sonata (1972)
- Peter Schickele, Sonata Abassoonata, S.888 (1996) Schickele's program notes state that "the bassoonist plays both the bassoon and piano parts simultaneously...the pianist...runs on only in time to play the last two measures"
- Robert Schollum, Two Sonatinas, Op. 55/3 and Op. 57/3
- Nikos Skalkottas, Sonata Concertante, A/K 67 (1943)
- Gunnar Sønstevold, Sonatina (1990)
- Luboš Sluka, Sonata (1956/71)
- Nicholas Van Slyck, Fantasia Numerica: Sonata for bassoon alone (1960)
- Dmitri Smirnov, Sonata, Op. 22
- Michael Smolanoff, Sonata, Op. 3 (1972)
- Gunnar Sønstevold, Sonatina (1990)
- Leon Stein, Sonata (1970)
- John Steinmetz, Sonata (1981)
- Halsey Stevens, Sonata (1949)
- Alexandre Tansman, Sonatine (1952)
- Alexander Tcherepnin, Sonatine Sportive for bassoon or saxophone and piano, Op. 63 (1939)
- Kunio Toda, Sonata (1965–66)
- Yuzo Toyama, Sonata (1987)
- Robert E. Tyndall, Sonata (1947)
- Lloyd Ultan, Sonatine for unaccompanied bassoon (1961), Sonata for bassoon and piano (1975)
- Mieczysław Weinberg, Sonata for bassoon solo, Op. 133
- Jaromír Weinberger, Sonatina for bassoon and piano (1940)
- Stanley Weiner, Sonata, Op. 32 (1971)
- Elliot Weisgarber, Sonata (1973)
- Alec Wilder, Three Sonatas, No. 1 (1968), No. 2 (1969) and No. 3 (1982)
- Adrian Williams, Sonata (1996)
- Luigi Zaninelli, Sonatina

== 21st century ==
- Teddy Abrams, Sonata (2007)
- Yves Bouillot, Sonata (2013)
- Robert J. Bradshaw, Sonata No. 7 "Ad Hoc" for bassoon and strings or piano (2008)
- Leo Eylar, Sonata (2008)
- Abraham Fabella, Sonata for Bassoon and Piano (2002–2003)
- Michael Finnissy, Sonata (2007)
- Nancy Galbraith, Sonata (2004)
- Sebastian Huydts, Sonata Breve (2006)
- Ivan Jevtić, Sonata (2005)
- David Maslanka, Sonata for Bassoon and Piano (2003)
- Robert Paterson, Sonata for Bassoon and Piano (2001)
- Nikola Resanovic, Sonata (2004)
- Simon Sargon, Sonata in A (2005) (also arranged for oboe and piano)
- Daniel Schnyder, Sonata for Bassoon and Piano
- Randall Snyder, Spring Sonata (2005)
- Helga Warner-Buhlman, Sonatine (c2003)
- Graham Waterhouse, Phoenix Arising in memoriam William Waterhouse for bassoon and piano (2008)

== See also ==
- Bassoon concerto
