= Jane Hurlstone =

British social reformer and painter (c. 1817–1858)

- Born: Jane Coral c. 1817; Middlesex, England
- Died: 2 October 1858 (aged 41); Chelsea, Middlesex, England
- Burial place: Norwood Cemetery
- Other name: Jane Coral Hurlstone
- Occupations: Social reformer; painter
- Spouse: Frederick Yeates Hurlstone (m. 1836)
- Children: 2
- Relatives: William Hurlstone (grandson)

Jane Hurlstone (née Coral; c. 1817 – 2 October 1858) was a British social reformer and painter. She supported animal welfare, vegetarianism, Owenism, and Italian nationalism. Historian James Gregory identifies her as a possible founding member of the RSPCA. She and her husband, Frederick Yeates Hurlstone, hosted meetings of early vegetarian societies at their home in Chester Street, Belgrave Square. Hurlstone exhibited watercolours and oil paintings at the Royal Academy of Arts and the Royal Society of British Artists.

== Biography ==
Hurlstone was born Jane Coral in about 1817 in Middlesex. (Note: James Gregory describes Hurlstone both as a "Scotswoman by birth" and "Scottish born". However, the 1841 and 1851 censuses record her birthplace as Middlesex and London respectively.) She married the painter Frederick Yeates Hurlstone at St Margaret's, Westminster, on 5 November 1836. They had two sons, one of whom later became an artist. One of her grandsons was the composer William Hurlstone.

Historian James Gregory identifies Hurlstone as a possible founding member of the RSPCA. He also describes her as active in several London-based vegetarian organisations. The Hurlstones' home at Chester Street, Belgrave Square, hosted meetings of early vegetarian societies, and both served on the committee of the London Vegetarian Association. Hurlstone also supported Owenism and Italian nationalism.

Hurlstone exhibited watercolours and portraits at the Royal Academy of Arts and the Royal Society of British Artists. Between 1850 and 1856, she showed only oil paintings of imaginative subjects at the latter. Her exhibited works included subjects connected with her social and political interests. In 1848, she exhibited John Bullism, accompanied by lines from Richard Monckton Milnes on the maltreatment of a horse. In 1850, under the motto "Look on this picture, and on this", she exhibited The Clubhouse and the Workhouse. In 1852, she exhibited The Women of England in the Nineteenth Century, and in 1853 One of the Friends of Italy.

Hurlstone died in Chelsea, Middlesex, on 2 October 1858, aged 41. She was buried at Norwood Cemetery on 7 October.

== See also ==
- History of vegetarianism
- Vegetarianism in the Victorian era
- Women and animal advocacy
- Women and vegetarianism and veganism advocacy
