= Heinrich Feischner =

Estonian composer (1910–1961)

Heinrich-Artur Feischner (sometimes Feisner or Feišner; Russian: Генрих Фейшнер; 22 June [O.S. 9 June] 1910 – 10 November 1961) was an Estonian composer.

== Life ==
Feischner was born in Reval (Tallinn) to Heinrich Gottlob Feischner, a confectioner and proprietor of the Café Feischner on Harju Street. Few details of his childhood years survive. According to a 1936 article in the Estonian newspaper Esmaspäev, Feischner met fellow composer Eugen Kapp (two years his senior) at the age of 14 while at school. This acquaintance inspired young Feischner to begin composing songs, which he later described as "naive and romantic ... they probably felt the influence of Tchaikovsky".

He attended the Leipzig Conservatory until 1931, studying composition with Hermann Grabner. He there became friends with fellow student composers Hugo Distler and Yuri Arbatsky. Upon his return to Tallinn, he continued his studies with Eugen Kapp and Adolf Vedro, while also working at his father's cafe, a respected hangout for writers, poets and musicians. Among his acquaintances there were the poets Alexis Rannit and Igor Severyanin; the latter dedicated his poem «Безвестные строки» ("Unknown Lines") to Feischner. His frequent musical collaborators included organist Paul Indra, soprano Olga Indra, clarinetist Bernhard Lukk, and bassoonist Leino Ernits, who performed his Trio quasi una fantasia, bassoon sonatina and wind quintet in 1936. Composer and music critic Riho Päts, who attended Ernits's performance of the bassoon sonatina and wind quintet, condemned the former as a work of "sprawling linearity ... unable to attract any substantial interest", but praised the latter for its "originality, humorous grotesqueness and strong western influences". The quintet appears to have been Feischner's most successful work of the time, winning a prize at a competition organized by the Estonian Society of Academic Sound Artists and receiving repeated mention in various newspaper articles. His compositional style of this period is unknown, since none of these works have survived to the present day, though Feischner himself cited the influences of Bach, Schubert, Hindemith and Stravinsky, particularly the latter's approach to instrumentation. Hindemith's influence was noted by an anonymous reviewer in Feischner's "para-tonal" neoclassical piano concerto (1935).

He emigrated to Germany either during or following World War II, eventually settling in Stuttgart. His first symphony premiered in Berlin on 7 December 1944, while the suite from his ballet Café Savoy was premiered by the Süddeutscher Rundfunk orchestra on 1 January 1946. Between 1954 and 1961 he wrote music for a dozen TV movies and miniseries. He died in Stuttgart at the age of 51.

Feischner's compositions remain little known. His only major work to be commercially recorded is his 1957 radio opera Zirkus Carambas (libretto by Werner Illing), commissioned by the Süddeutscher Rundfunk. Premiered in 1958, the production starred Fritz Wunderlich, Lore Paul, Horst Günter, Gisela Litz, Benno Kusche, Alfred Pfeifle, Manfred Gerbert, Bruno Samland, and Ernst Ronnecker, with Hans Müller-Kray conducting. The original production, recorded at Villa Berg in Stuttgart, was released on CD by Cantus Classics in 2014. Some of his film music has been recently released by Josef Weinberger, Ltd. of London, including a track titled "Tense Approach", which was repeatedly used—uncredited—in the 1967 Spider-Man TV series.

Stylistically, the few extant recordings of Feischner's later works suggest an affinity towards Stravinsky's early compositional vocabulary: prominent woodwinds, brass and percussion, chromatic tonal harmonies, and often humorous character. These features can be heard in his "Grotesque" (possibly a film score excerpt).

== Works ==
Almost nothing is known of Feischner's output beyond sporadic references to specific pieces in Estonian newspapers from the 1930s. Most of his compositions remain unpublished, though a few late works are available for hire from Bote & Bock through Boosey & Hawkes.

=== Principal works ===
- Dance music Libahundis [Werewolf] (1934)
- Piano Concerto in C major (1935)
- Cantata Vaikusepüha [Holy silence] (1936)
- Stage music to a production of Molière's Le malade imaginaire (1936)
- Bassoon Sonatina (1936)
- Serenade for wind quintet (1936)
- Trio quasi una fantasia, Op. 5, no. 1, for viola, clarinet and bassoon (1936)
- Ööpalad [Night Pieces]: Suite for oboe, clarinet and lyric soprano, Op. 5, no. 2 (1936)
- Pihtimus [Confession]: Sonata for chamber orchestra and organ, Op. 9 (1938)
- Kariniaad, Op. 10 (1938)
- song cycle on Alexis Rannit's “Ex libro amoris” (1938)
- Vocal solo Kevadine [Spring] (1938)
- Little Suite for Piano (1938)
- Vocal solo Roosid sügisel [Roses in autumn] (1939)
- Aaria jõulumuusikast, Op. 15 (1939)
- Symphony No. 1, Op. 20 (1942)
- Suite from the ballet Café Savoy, Op. 22a (1945)
- Du und die Nacht [You and the night]: A Ringelnatz-Cantata, Op. 23 for women's choir, oboe, trumpet, piano and timpani
- Tanztheater Die Matrosenballade (1948) – libretto by Günter Heß
- Opera Zirkus Carambas (1957)
- String Quartet

=== Film music ===
- Zeichen der Zeit (1954–55) at IMDb
- Towarisch (1955) at IMDb
- Gaslicht (1956) at IMDb
- Pygmalion (1956) at IMDb
- Der Geisterzug (1957) at IMDb
- Moral (1958) at IMDb
- Bei Anruf Mord (1959)
- Gäste auf Woodcastle (1960) at IMDb
- Herr Raymond kommt nicht (1961) at IMDb
- Wir waren drei (1961) at IMDb
- Schritte in der Nacht (1961) at IMDb
- Onkel Harry (1961) at IMDb
