= Lloyd Ultan =

Lloyd Ultan may refer to:

- Lloyd Ultan (composer) (1929–1998), American composer of contemporary classical music
- Lloyd Ultan (historian) (born 1938), American historian, author and professor
