= Wacky Wednesday =

Wacky Wednesday may refer to:

- Wacky Wednesday (book), a Dr. Seuss book
- Alternative title of the film Day Off
