= Victor Bruns =

German composer (1904–1996)

- Victor Bruns, in the 1970s
- Born: 15 August 1904; Ollila, Finland
- Died: 6 December 1996 (aged 92); Berlin, Germany
- Occupations: Bassoonist; Composer

Victor Bruns (Russian: Виктор Брунс; 15 August 1904 – 6 December 1996) was a German composer and bassoonist. He played with the Leningrad Opera, the Volksoper Berlin and the Staatskapelle Berlin. As a composer, he is known for his ballets and for bassoon concertos and sonatas.

== Career ==
Victor Bruns was born to German parents in their summer house in Ollila near St Petersburg, in an area which was, at the time, part of the Russian Empire. He attended a German school where he received his first piano lessons. After briefly studying science at the Technical University, he studied at the Petrograd State Conservatory (later the Leningrad State Conservatory). There he studied the bassoon with Alexander Vasilyev from 1924 to 1927, and composition with Vladimir Shcherbakov from 1927 to 1931. He graduated with his first Bassoon Concerto, Op. 5, which he premiered in 1933 with the Leningrad Philharmonic. From 1927 to 1938, he was second bassoonist at the Leningrad Opera.

When he was expelled from the Soviet Union for being a German citizen suspected of spionage, he took the same position from 1940 to 1944 at the Berlin Volksoper. When the Volksoper building was destroyed in 1944 by bombing, the orchestra moved to Hirschberg in Silesia. Bruns was drafted into the army, came into Soviet captivity, and returned to Berlin in December 1945. He studied composition with Boris Blacher from 1946 to 1949. From 1946 to 1969, he was second bassoonist and contrabassoonist with the Staatskapelle Berlin, which premiered many of his works, and became its honorary member in 1969. In 1960, he was awarded the Art Prize of the German Democratic Republic. The International Double Reed Society (IDRS) named him its 16th Honorary Member in 1986, on a nomination by William Waterhouse. In 1994, he became seriously ill and spent the last two years of his life in a Berlin Senior nursing home, where he died.

== Works ==
The focus of his work is instrumental concertos and chamber music while there was wide appreciation of his ballets, such as Das Recht des Herrn (1953) by Daisy Spies and Neue Odyssee (1957) by Albert Burkat.

Compositions by Bruns include:

Stage

- Das Recht des Herrns, ballet, Op. 27 (1953)
- Das Edelfräulein als Bäuerin, ballet, Op. 31 (1955)
- Neue Odyssee, ballet, Op. 33 (1957)
- Minna von Barnhelm, chamber opera, Op. 39 (1962–1967)
- Theseus, ballet trilogy

1. Das Band der Ariadne, Op. 46 (1969–1971)
2. Ariadne auf Naxos, Op. 54 (1973–1974)
3. Phaedra, Op. 56 (1975)

Orchestral

- Symphony No. 1, Op. 13 (1943)
- Orchesterstücke (Orchestral pieces), Op. 19 (1948)
- Symphony No. 2, Op. 21 (1949); withdrawn
- Sinfonietta, Op. 23 (1950)
- Symphony No. 3 "Dramatische", Op. 37 (1960)
- Symphony No. 4 "Konzertante", Op. 47 (1970)
- Symphony No. 5, Op. 64 (1979)
- Symphony No. 6 "Breve", Op. 67 (1980)
- Kammersinfonie (Chamber symphony) for string orchestra, Op. 70 (1981)

Concertante

- Concerto No. 1 for bassoon and orchestra, Op. 5 (1933)
- Concerto No. 2 for bassoon and orchestra, Op. 15 (1946)
- Concerto No. 1 for clarinet and orchestra, Op. 25 (1951)
- Concerto for oboe and small orchestra, Op. 28 (1952)
- Concerto No. 1 for cello and orchestra, Op. 29 (1958)
- Concerto No. 1 for violin and orchestra, Op. 36 (1959)
- Concerto No. 3 for bassoon and orchestra, Op. 41 (1966)
- Concerto No. 2 for clarinet and orchestra, Op. 48 (1971)
- Concerto for trumpet and orchestra, Op. 50 (1972)
- Concerto for flute and small orchestra, Op. 51 (1972)
- Concerto No. 2 for violin and small orchestra, Op. 53 (1974)
- Concerto No. 2 for cello and small orchestra, Op. 59 (1977)
- Concerto for English horn and string orchestra, Op. 61 (1978)
- Concerto for horn and small orchestra, Op. 63 (1979)
- Concerto for oboe, bassoon and string orchestra, Op. 66 (1980)
- Concerto for viola and small orchestra, Op. 69 (1981)
- Concerto for double bass and string orchestra, Op. 73 (1982)
- Concerto for flute, English horn, string orchestra and percussion, Op. 74 (1982)
- Concerto No. 3 for clarinet and small orchestra, Op. 76 (1984)
- Concerto No. 3 for cello and small orchestra, Op. 77 (1984)
- Concerto No. 4 for bassoon and orchestra, Op. 83 (1986)
- Concerto for wind quintet, percussion and string orchestra, Op. 85 (1987)
- Concerto for 2 clarinets and small orchestra, Op. 87 (1988)
- Concerto for violine, cello and orchestra, Op. 89 (1989)
- Concerto for contrabassoon and orchestra, Op. 98 (1992)

Chamber music

- Musik for 3 clarinets and bassoon, Op. 1; lost
- Kleine Suite for 2 flutes, 2 oboes and 2 bassoons, Op. 2; lost
- String Quartet No. 1, Op. 6 (1934); lost
- Sonata for violin and piano, Op. 9 (1937); lost
- 3 Stücke for cello and piano, Op. 11 (1938)
- 5 Stücke for bassoon and piano, Op. 12 (1939)
- Wind Quintet, Op. 16 (1947)
- String Quartet No. 2, Op. 17 (1947)
- Quartett für Holzbläser (Quartet for woodwinds), Op. 18 (1948)
- Sonata (no. 1) for bassoon and piano, Op. 20 (1949)
- Sonata for clarinet and piano, Op. 22 (1949)
- Sonata for oboe and piano, Op. 24 (1950, revised 1961)
- Sonata for oboe and piano, Op. 25 (1950)
- 5 Stücke for piano, Op. 30 (1953)
- Fagottstudien für Fortgeschrittene (Advanced bassoon studies), Op. 32 (1955)
- Sextet for wind quintet and piano, Op. 34 (1957)
- Sonata for cello and piano, Op. 35 (1958)
- String Quartet No. 3, Op. 38 (1961)
- 5 Stücke for bassoon and piano, Op. 40 (1965)
- Octet for clarinet, bassoon, horn, 2 violins, viola, cello and double bass, Op. 42 (1968)
- Expressionen for cello and piano, Op. 43 (1968)
- 4 Stücke for clarinet and piano, Op. 44 (1968)
- Sonata No. 2 for bassoon and piano, Op. 45 (1969)
- Trio for oboe, clarinet and bassoon, Op. 49 (1971)
- 6 Stücke for cello and piano, Op. 52 (1973)
- Kleine Suite Nr. 1 for 3 bassoons and contrabassoon, Op. 55 (1974)
- 2 Stücke for contrabassoon and piano, Op. 57 (1975)
- Konzertante Musik for bassoon and string trio, Op. 58 (1976)
- Sonata for viola and piano, Op. 60 (1977)
- Kleine Sinfonie for 12 cellos, Op. 62 (1978)
- 2 Bagatellen (2 bagatelles) for violin and cello, Op. 65 (1980)
- Kleine Suite Nr. 2 for 3 bassoons and contrabassoon, Op. 68 (1981)
- String Sextet No. 1, Op. 71 (1982)
- Miniaturen (Miniatures) for 6 flutes, Op. 72 (1982)
- String Sextet No. 2, Op. 75 (1985)
- String Quintet No. 1 for 2 violins, 2 violas and cello, Op. 79 (1985)
- 6 Stücke for contrabassoon and piano, Op. 80 (1986)
- String Quintet No. 2, Op. 81 (1986)
- Piano Trio, Op. 82 (1986)
- Trio No. 1 for clarinet, bassoon and piano, Op. 84 (1987)
- Sonata No. 3 for bassoon and piano, Op. 86 (1988)
- Sonata No. 2 for violin and piano, Op. 88 (1988)
- Sonata for flute and piano, Op. 90 (1989)
- Trio No. 2 for clarinet, bassoon and piano, Op. 91 (1990)
- Kleine Suite Nr. 3 for 3 bassoons and contrabassoon, Op. 92 (1990)
- 4 virtuose Stücke for bassoon solo, Op. 93
- 4 virtuose Stücke for horn solo, Op. 94 (1989)
- Concertante Suite, Op. 95 (1991)
- Sonatina for tenor bassoon and piano, Op. 96 (1991)
- Trio for tenor bassoon, bassoon and contrabassoon, Op. 97 (1992), dedicated to William Waterhouse
- Octet for bassoons, Op. 99 (fragment)

Vocal

- Romanze for bass (or baritone) and piano, Op. 10 (1938); words by Alexander Pushkin

== Recordings ==
Bassoonist Eric Stomberg and friends recorded chamber music, two bassoon sonatas and two suites for three bassoons and contrabassoon.
