= Wacky Wednesday (book) =

1974 book by Dr. Seuss

- Author: Dr. Seuss
- Illustrator: George Booth
- Series: I Can Read It All By Myself Beginner Books Series
- Publisher: Random House Children's Books
- Publication date: September 28, 1974 (renewed in 2002)
- Media type: Print (hardcover and paperback)
- ISBN: 9780394829128

Wacky Wednesday is a children’s book written by Dr. Seuss as Theo LeSieg and illustrated by George Booth. It has forty-eight pages, and is based around a world of progressively wackier occurrences, where kids can point out that there is a picture frame upside down, a palm tree growing in the toilet, an earthworm chasing a bird, an airplane flying backward, a tiger chauffeur, and a traffic light showing that stop is green and go is red, as some examples.

== Plot ==
The main character, an unnamed child who serves as the narrator, wakes up to find a shoe on the wall then looks up to find another one on the ceiling as well. With each new page, the number of "wacky" things grows, as the child goes through a morning routine and arrives to George Washington School, trying to alert others to the wacky occurrences. When the classmates ignore these warnings and Miss Bass, the child's teacher, says that this is disrupting the class, Miss Bass throws the child out (implying that no one else can see these things).

As the world gets progressively crazier, the child runs around trying to escape it and find help, and eventually runs into Patrolman McGann, who declares that Wacky Wednesday will end as soon as every last wacky thing has been counted – the final page having 20 in total.

At the end, the shoe on the wall disappears as the child goes to bed.

== Television series ==
A television series based on the book and aimed at preschoolers is in development for Netflix.

== Bans ==
In 2023, the Katy Independent School District, in Katy, Texas ruled that the book was inappropriate for children due to a new policy banning all nudity. The school board removed it from the shelves of their school libraries, along with 13 other titles.

== See also ==
- Dr. Seuss books
