= Frederick Yeates Hurlstone =

English painter (1800–1869)

Frederick Yeates Hurlstone RBA
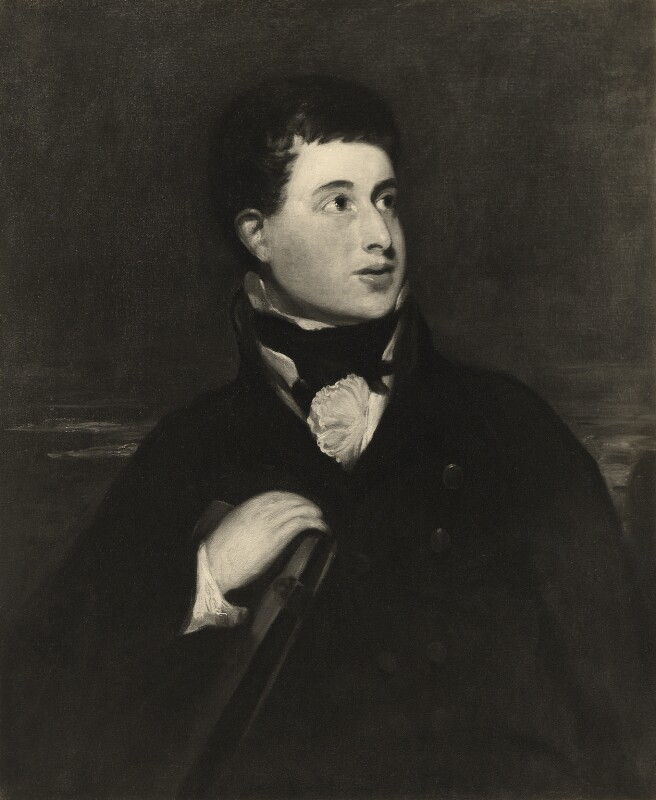
- 1830 portrait
- Born: 6 December 1800; London, England
- Died: 10 June 1869 (aged 68); London, England
- Occupation: Painter
- Spouse: Jane Coral (m. 1836; died 1858)
- Children: 2
- Relatives: William Hurlstone (grandson)

Frederick Yeates Hurlstone RBA (6 December 1800 – 10 June 1869) was an English painter. He was celebrated for his historical, portrait, and genre works, particularly scenes of Spanish and Italian rustic life. Trained under Sir William Beechey and Sir Thomas Lawrence, he won prestigious medals at the Royal Academy before focusing on exhibitions with the Society of British Artists, where he served as president from 1835 until his death. Known for works like The Last Sigh of the Moor and Italian Boys Playing the National Game of Mora, Hurlstone drew inspiration from travels to Italy, Spain, and Morocco, shifting to a "picaresco" style influenced by Murillo and Velázquez. Despite his opposition to the Royal Academy's management, he remained a prolific and influential figure, contributing over 300 works to exhibitions and earning international recognition, including a gold medal at the 1855 Exposition Universelle in Paris.

== Life ==
Frederick Yeates Hurlstone was born in London on 6 December 1800, the eldest son by his second marriage of Thomas Y. Hurlstone, one of the proprietors of The Morning Chronicle (his great-uncle, Richard Hurleston, was a student of Joseph Wright of Derby). He began life in the office of his father's journal, but, while still very young, became a pupil of Sir William Beechey, afterwards studying under Sir Thomas Lawrence, and Benjamin Haydon.

His first paid work was an altar-piece, painted in 1816, for which he received 20 pounds. In 1820 he was admitted as a student of the Royal Academy, where in 1822 he gained the silver medal for the best copy made in the school of painting, and in 1823 the gold medal for historical painting, the subject being The Contention between the Archangel Michael and Satan for the Body of Moses. He first exhibited in 1821, sending to the Royal Academy Le Malade Imaginaire and to the British Institution a View near Windsor. These were followed at the Academy in 1822 by The Return of the Prodigal Son and a portrait, in 1823 by five portraits, and in 1824 by his Archangel Michael and some more portraits.

One of his best early works was A Venetian Page with a Parrot, exhibited at the British Institution in 1824. In 1824 also he contributed The Bandit Chief to the first exhibition of the Society of British Artists. He continued to send portraits to the Royal Academy until 1830, but in 1831 he was elected a member of the Society of British Artists, after which he seldom exhibited elsewhere. He was chosen president in 1835, and again in 1840, retaining the office until his death. He contributed to the society's exhibitions upwards of three hundred portraits and other works, among them being The Enchantress Armida, exhibited in 1831; Haidee aroused from her Trance by the sound of Music, 1834; Eros, 1836; Italian Boys playing at the National Game of Mora and the Prisoner of Chillon, 1837; The Scene in St. Peter's, Rome, from Byron's Deformed Transformed, 1839; The Convent of St. Isidore: the Monks giving away provisions, 1841; and a Scene in a Spanish Posada in Andalusia, 1843.

In 1844 and, for the last time, in 1845 he again sent portraits to the Academy. His subsequent works at the Society of British Artists included The Sons of Jacob bringing the blood-stained garment of Joseph to their Father, 1844; Salute, Signore, 1845; A Girl of Sorrento at a Well, 1847; Inhabitants of the Palace of the Cæsars—Rome in the Nineteenth Century, 1850; Columbus asking Alms at the Convent of La Rabida, 1853; The Last Sigh of the Moor (or Boabdil el Chico, mourning over the Fall of Granada, reproached by his Mother), 1854; and Margaret of Anjou and Edward, Prince of Wales, in the wood on their flight after the Battle of Hexham, 1860. Besides these may be noted The Eve of the Land which is still Paradise and Constance and Prince Arthur.

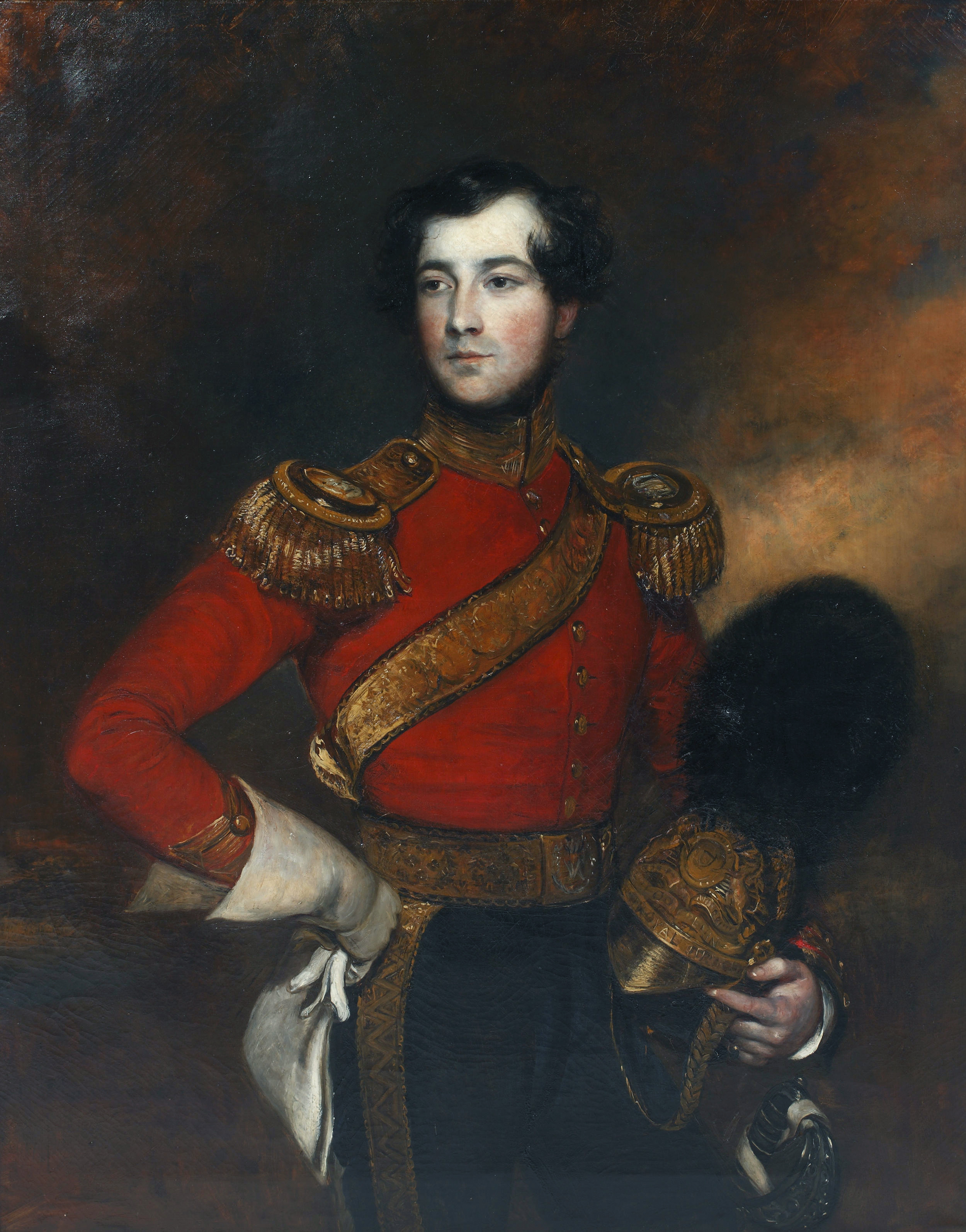
Lieutenant Charles Philip de Ainslie, by Frederick Yeates Hurlstone

His later works, consisted mainly of Spanish and Italian rustic subjects, the outcome of several visits to Italy, Spain, and Morocco, made between 1835 and 1854. "His best pictures date from this period." "In the year 1836, in consequence of visiting Italy, Mr. Hurlstone in a great measure discontinued a style which had been attended with great success, and took to painting works in what Spaniards call the 'picaresco' style – a style which includes beggar-boys and vagabonds of Murillo and Velasquez. In his groups of Italian boys and girls, Mr. Hurlstone has given representations of an uncluttered life; often of that beauty which is united with wilderness, and this without the vulgarity with which such subjects are too often treated. In 1841, and again in 1852, he somewhat varied his subjects, by drawing his resources from Spain, which country he visited those years; but his style of treatment remained essentially the same. In the year 1854 the painter visited Morocco, and while in that semi-bararous locality, he painted several pictures, of which the principle on was a subject from the History of the Moors in Spain, entitled, Bobadil el Chico (the last king) Mourning over the Fall of Grenada, reproached by his Mother, which, together with his Italian Boys Playing the National Game of Mora, and his Constance and Arthur formed Mr. Hurlstone's contributions to the Exposition Universelle in Paris in 1855, when he received from the Emperor a gold medal of honour." Eleven of his best works were re-exhibited at the Society of British Artists in 1870.

Hurlstone was also a successful portrait painter, one of his best heads being that of Richard, seventh earl of Cavan, exhibited at the Society of British Artists in 1833, and again, together with that of General Sir John MacLeod, at the National Portrait Exhibition of 1868.

He was always much opposed to the constitution and management of the Royal Academy, and gave evidence before at the Parliamentary enquiry into the constitution of the Royal Academy in 1835 and again in 1836 to the select committee of the House of Commons. Hurlstone never became a member of the Royal Academy. He was elected president of the Royal Society of British Artists in 1835 and held the office until his death sending 326 works to their exhibitions.

Hurlstone died at 9 Chester Street, Belgravia, London, on 10 June 1869, in his sixty-ninth year, and was buried in Norwood cemetery.

=== Family and descendants ===
In 1836 Hurlstone married fellow artist Jane Coral who exhibited some watercolour drawings and portraits at the Royal Academy and the Society of British Artists between 1846 and 1850, but from 1850 to 1856 she contributed to the latter exhibition only fancy subjects in oil-colours. She died on 2 October 1858, leaving issue two sons, one of whom was also an artist. Hurlstone's grandson, William Hurlstone, became a moderately well-known composer.

== Vegetarianism ==
Hurlstone made notable contributions to the early vegetarian movement in London, likely influenced by his wife, Jane Hurlstone. Their home at Chester Street, Belgrave Square, hosted several early vegetarian society meetings, and Frederick served on the gentlemen's committee of the London Vegetarian Association in 1854.

== Some representative works ==
- A Venetian Page (1824)
- The Enchantress Armida (1831)
- Eros (1836)
- Prisoner of Chillon (1837)
- The Peasant Girl of Sorrento (1847)
- A Boy of Venice (1853)
- Boabdil (1854)
- Portrait of the 7th Earl of Cavan (1833)
