= Richard Hurleston =

English painter (1740s-1780s)

Richard Hurlstone
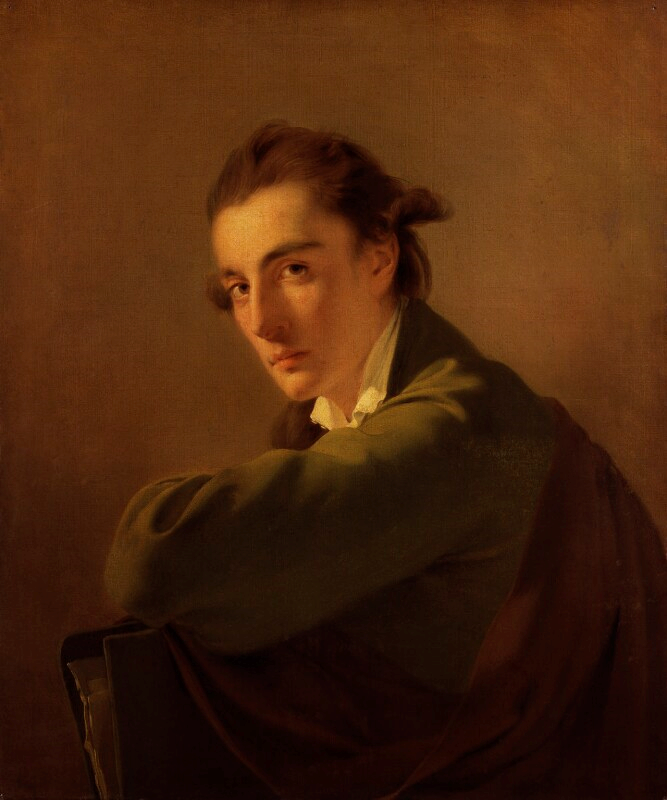
- speculated that this MAY be Hurleston by Joseph Wright
- Born: 1740s London
- Died: 1780s Salisbury plain
- Known for: trip to Italy

Richard Hurlstone or Richard Hurleston (1740s – 1780s) was a British portrait painter known for being a pupil of Joseph Wright of Derby. He went to Italy with Wright and his wife. He returned and died young after being hit by lightning on Salisbury Plain.

== Life ==
Hurlstone may have been born in 1746 in St Martin in the Fields as someone of that name was baptised there on 9 March that year. Hurlstone was born to William and Mary Hurlstone who lived in Lincoln's Inn Fields.

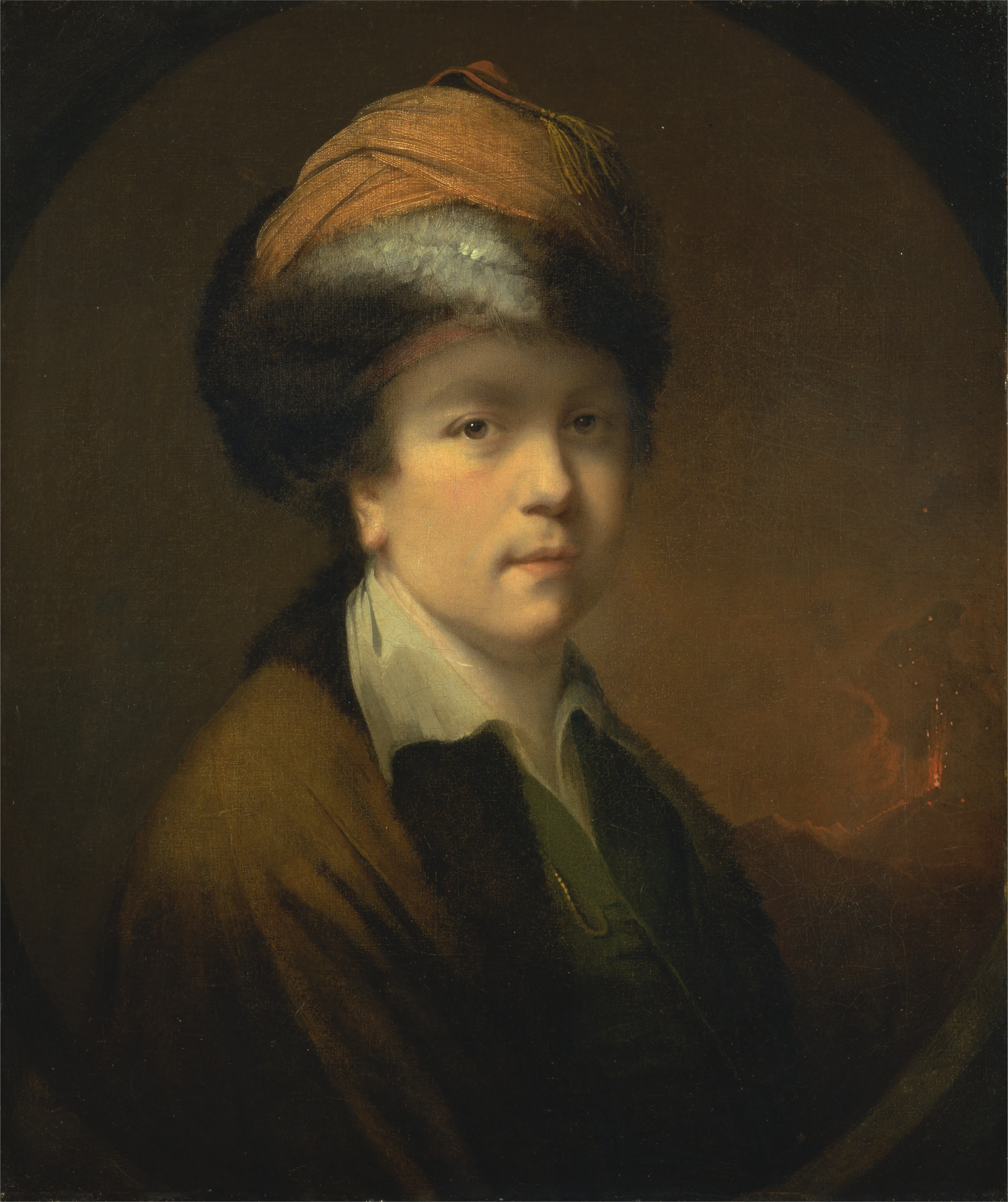
Richard Hurleston's Joseph Wright of Derby

Hurleston was trained at the Royal Academy starting in 1769 as a result of a "premium" given by the Society of the Arts. Hurlestone became a pupil of Joseph Wright of Derby and he set sail in 1773 with Wright, a pregnant Ann Wright and a fellow artist, John Downman, for Italy. Their ship took shelter for three weeks in Nice before they completed their outward voyage in Livorno in Italy in February 1774. They journeyed on to Rome and Hurlestone was there in 1775 and 1776. In 1776 he also recreated some of the masterpieces in the Uffuzi Gallery in Florence.

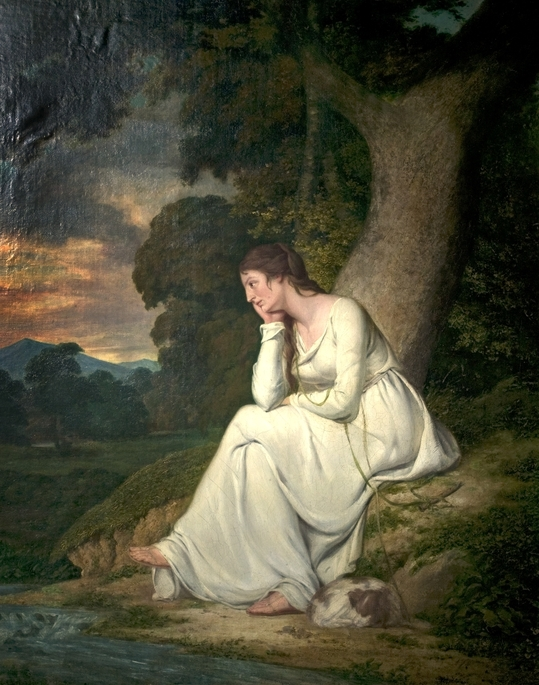
Maria and her Dog Silvio by Richard Hurlstone or Hurleston in Derby Museum

Known paintings by him include a portrait of his master Joseph Wright which is in Derby Museum. It has been speculated by Bendor Grosvenor that a painting in the National Portrait Gallery is a painting of Hurleston by Joseph Wright but this is not accepted by other experts. There is also a 12 x 12 cm painting entitled Maria and her Dog which is based on the character in the Laurence Sterne novels. A character called Maria appears in both 'Tristam Shandy and A Sentimental Journey Through France and Italy by Sterne. Hurleston's painting of Maria was exhibited in 1780 and is now (2013) in the Derby Museum and Art Gallery. That gallery has other paintings based on Laurence Sterne's novels by Joseph Wright. Wright painted a first version of The Captive in Hurlestone's lifetime but the first of his two versions of Maria was not started until 1781. Other paintings should include those he exhibited at the Royal Academy before he left for Italy.

== Death and legacy ==
Hurleston died young after being hit by lightning whilst riding on Salisbury Plain. Some sources give his date of death as 1777 and others report 1780. Hurleston's nephew was a proprietor of the Morning Chronicle newspaper and his son, Frederick Yeates Hurlstone, was also a notable painter.
