= George Booth =

George Booth may refer to:

- George Booth, 1st Baron Delamer (1622–1684), English Royalist, and instigator of the Booth Uprising in 1659
- George Booth, 2nd Earl of Warrington (1675–1758), English aristocrat
- George Booth (pirate) (died 1701), English pirate active on the Indian Ocean during the Golden Age of Piracy
- George Booth (cricketer) (1767–?), English cricketer
- George Gough Booth (1864–1949), American newspaper publisher, philanthropist and founder of the Cranbrook Educational Community in Bloomfield Hills, Michigan
- George Macaulay Booth (1877–1971), British businessman and a director of the Bank of England
- George Booth (footballer, born 1882), (1882-1916), English footballer, see List of Bury F.C. players (1–24 appearances)
- George Booth (politician) (1891–1960), New South Wales politician
- George Formby (1904–1961), English singer born George Hoy Booth
- George Booth (cartoonist) (1926–2022), American cartoonist for The New Yorker
- George Booth (footballer, born 1991), English footballer, see 2010–11 Bristol Rovers F.C. season
- George Booth (footballer, born 2007), footballer for Reading, see 2025–26 FA Youth Cup
