= Hermann Grabner =

Austrian composer and music teacher

- Born: 12 May 1886; Austrian
- Died: 3 June 1969 (aged 83)
- Occupations: Composer and music teacher.

Hermann Grabner (12 May 1886 – 3 July 1969) was an Austrian composer and music teacher.

== Career ==
Grabner was born in Graz. He studied law at the University of Graz graduating in 1909. In parallel, he studied music with Leopold Suchsland until 1910. He also played the viola for a while in the Grazer Theatherorchester. He then studied at the Leipzig Conservatory with Max Reger and Hans Sitt. In 1912, he worked as assistant to Reger in the Meininger Theater. In 1913, he became teacher of music theory at the Conservatoire de Strasbourg. He served in the Austrian Army during World War I. From 1919 to 1924, he was teacher of theory and composition at the Hochschule für Musik und Darstellende Kunst Mannheim. He also taught at the Music Academy in Heidelberg. He was then teacher of composition at the Leipzig Conservatory, where his students included Hugo Distler, Artur Immisch, Hilding Hallnäs, Heinrich Feischner, and Miklós Rózsa. From 1930, he was music director of the University. From 1938 to 1946, he taught at the Berlin Musikhochschule. He was retired in June 1946 due to his SA membership and the Nazi-composition "Fackelträger", Lieder des neuen Reiches.

He composed one opera, Die Richterin with libretto by Beyerlein after C. F. Meyer, premiered in the Barmen State Theater in 1930; orchestral works, chamber music, choral works, Lieder, two motets and numerous organ pieces.

He died in Bolzano.
