= Hilding Hallnäs =

Swedish composer (1903–1984)

Hilding Hallnäs (24 May 1903 – 11 September 1984) was a Swedish composer. Hallnäs was married to the actress Gun Holmquist.

== Life and career ==
Hallnäs was born in Halmstad, Sweden, in 1903. His father had been a tenor and sang in choirs. After matriculation in his home town, he entered the Royal College of Music, Stockholm in 1924, studying with Gustaf Hägg and Otto Olsson, and graduated as an organist (1926) and music teacher (1928). He pursued organ studies in Paris with Alexandre Eugène Cellier, and studied composition in Leipzig with Hermann Grabner.

In 1933, Hallnäs became organist of the Johanneberg church in Gothenburg, remaining until his retirement in 1968, teaching harmony at the Gothenburg Orchestral Society and becoming a leading light in the musical world of Gothenburg. He was active in the Levande Musik (Living Music) concert association and the Gothenburg Composers' Association. In 1974, he settled in Stockholm.

Prior to the Second World War Hallnäs was counted among neoclassicists such as Dag Wirén and Lars-Erik Larsson, but after he began using his own 12-tone system, first heard in his fourth symphony (1952–1955) Metamorfosi sinfonice.

He died in Stockholm in 1984.

== Awards ==
Hallnäs was awarded the Illis quorum in 1963 and the Litteris et Artibus in 1981.

== Selected compositions ==
=== Music for the stage ===
- Ballet: Kärlekens ringdans (1955)
- Ballet: Ifigenia (1961–63)

=== Orchestral music ===
- Divertimento for orchestra (1937)
- Seven symphonies (including Sinfonietta pastorale (1944), Sinfonia notturna (1946), Small symphony for strings (1947), Metamorfose sinfonice (1952))
- Violin concerto (1945)
- Piano concerto (1956)
- Flute concertos (1957, 1962)
- En grekisk saga (1967 – a protest against the junta's seizure of power)
- Viola concerto (1978)
- Cello concerto (1981–82)

=== Organ music ===
- Fantasi (1936)
- Fantasi and preludium with chorale (1957)
- Pietà (1962)
- Organ sonatas – No 1: De profundis (1965), No 2 (1977)
- Passionsmusik - Musica dolorosa (1968)

=== Chamber music ===
- Viola Sonata, Op. 19 (1943); dedicated to Sten Broman
- Legend for viola and piano (1945)
- String Quartet (1949)
- Spel för två (Jeux à deux) for clarinet and viola (1960)
- Violin Sonatas (1965), (1975)
- Partita Amabile and other works for guitar

=== Vocal ===
- Rapsodia (1963) for soprano and chamber orchestra
- Cantata solemnis (1971)
- Around 100 songs,
