= George Macaulay Booth =

British businessman and director of the Bank of England (1877 - 1971)

Booth in 1946.

George Macaulay Booth (22 September 1877 – 10 March 1971) was a British businessman, and a director of the Bank of England.

George Macaulay Booth was born on 22 September 1877 in London, the son of the social reformer Charles Booth and his wife Mary Catherine Macaulay.

From 1936 to 1937, he was High Sheriff of the County of London, and living at 28 Chester Street, Belgravia. He declined Lloyd George's offer of a barony.

On 6 October 1906, he married Margaret Meinertzhagen (1880–1959), daughter of Daniel Meinertzhagen VI and Georgina Potter. Her brother was the naturalist Richard Meinertzhagen (1878–1967).
