= Bassoon Sonata (Hurlstone) =

1904 bassoon sonata with piano accompaniment by William Hurlstone

The Sonata in F major is a bassoon sonata with piano accompaniment written by William Hurlstone in 1904, two years before his death. It was first published by Avision in 1907, and was later re-issued by Emerson in 1976.

== Movements and Analysis ==
The piece is divided into four movements:

1. Vivace
2. Ballade: Moderato, ma sempre a piacere
3. Allegretto - Poco maestoso - Tempo I - Più lento
4. Moderato - Animato - Vivace

=== I. Vivace ===
The first movement is divided into six sections. It opens in 6/8 with a forte statement of the theme on the bassoon.

After 40 measures, the second section begins. It is in 2/4, and modulates from F to C. The tempo remains the same, but it is marked ma più lente. The piano has the first statement of the second theme, which is more legato then the first theme. After a series of minor thirds descending chromatically, the second section ends.

The third section is once more in 6/8, but is still has the key signature of C major. The key changes frequently, however, as the section is mostly composed of scales and arpeggios with many accidentals. After working up to a high B in the bassoon part, it gradually slows and decreases in pitch and volume, before ending with a low B♭ on the piano.

The fourth section is a restatement of the first section, once more in F. It begins piano this time, but quickly grows back to a forte. It is followed by the fifth section, which is a shortened version of the second section, this time transposed to F.

The final section is marked Animato and begins with a three measure bassoon solo. The melody is sharply staccato, and the movement ends with the last four notes of an F major scale.

=== II. Ballade: Moderato, ma sempre a piacere ===
The second movement (ballade) is in G minor. It remains in 4/4 throughout. The piano opens with the melody, a very legato one with many dotted notes. The bassoon soon enters, with a long, mourning line. Variations on the melody are played, before a brief section in G major. The movement returns to G minor with a long bassoon line that slowly grows into a brief Poco animato in A major. The movement returns to G minor with a statement of the original theme, and gradually fades out, to end on a final G major chord.

=== III. Allegretto - Poco maestoso - Tempo I - Più lento ===
The third movement is a clumsy waltz. Although marked Allegretto, there is much give and take with the tempo. It has many runs that are cut short by sharp staccatos. About a third of the way through the movement, it abruptly modulates into D flat major, and the Poco maestoso is reached. Although more legato, it still retains the light-hearted clumsiness of the earlier section. The movement then returns to F major, and the first theme returns. The last section is marked Più lento, and the movement ends on a V chord.

=== IV. Moderato - Animato - Vivace ===
The final movement opens with an ad lib statement of the theme from the second movement. Soon, however, the sprightly Vivace in F is reached. The melody (in 2/4) uses many syncopated rhythms, along with many sixteenth notes. A second theme follows, which consists almost entirely of dotted-eight/ sixteenth rhythms, however the first theme restates itself quickly. Soon, however, the theme from the second movement is restated, this time in B flat minor. This quickly evolves back to the first theme of this movement, now in E major. After much modulation, the theme returns to its original form in F major. The piece ends with a final Animato. The last strains of the theme are heard, and the piece ends on a pedal F in the bassoon part.
