= Odette Gartenlaub =

French pianist, music teacher and composer (1922–2014)

Odette Gartenlaub (13 March 1922 – 20 September 2014) was a French pianist, music teacher and composer.

== Biography ==
Odette Gartenlaub studied music at the Paris Conservatory with Olivier Messiaen, Henri Busser, Noël Gallon and Darius Milhaud, and won the Premier Grand Prix de Rome in 1948. She became well known as a soloist, performing with orchestras internationally. The daughter of Jewish parents, she was forced to abandon her studies at the Paris Conservatoire in September 1941 when the Conservatoire enforced statutes banning the attendance of Jews at the institution in the era of Nazi-occupied Paris. In 1959 she took a position as a professor at the Paris Conservatory.

On September 20, 2014, she died at Hôpital Cochin in Paris, at the age of 92.

== Works ==
Gartenlaub's compositions include works for orchestra, chamber ensemble and solo instruments. Selected works include:

- Étude concertante (1984) for viola solo
- Pour le Cor (1968) for horn and piano
- Les Coin des Enfants (1971) for piano
- Antique
- Grave et Toccata (1968) for piano
- Sept Petit Études
- Trois Caracteres (1974) for trombone and piano or orchestra; Paris Conservatory contest piece in 1974 and 1981
