= Solnechnoye, Saint Petersburg =

Municipal settlement in St. Petersburg, Russia

Coordinates: 60.14°N 29.94°E

Location of Solnechnoye within St. Petersburg

Solnechnoye (Russian: Со́лнечное; Finnish: Ollila) is a municipal settlement in Kurortny District of the federal city of St. Petersburg, Russia, located on the Karelian Isthmus, on the northern shore of the Gulf of Finland. Population: 1,370 (2010 census); 1,161 (2002 census); 1,574 (1989 Soviet census).

Before the Winter War and Continuation War, it was a part of Finland and was located near the border with the Soviet Union.
