= Ellis Kohs =

American composer and scholar

Ellis Bonoff Kohs (May 12, 1916 – May 17, 2000) was an American composer, theory textbook author, and Professor at the University of Southern California.

== Life and career ==
Born in Chicago to Pauline Bonoff, a school teacher of Russian Jewish extraction, and Samuel C. Kohs, Kohs grew up in San Francisco, where he undertook his early musical studies at the San Francisco Conservatory. In 1928 his family moved to New York where he entered the Institute of Musical Art. He continued his studies at the University of Chicago, studying composition with Carl Bricken. After he completed his master's degree there in 1938, he returned to New York and enrolled at the Juilliard School, where he studied composition with Bernard Wagenaar. He also studied composition with Walter Piston and musicology with Willi Apel and Hugo Leichtentritt at Harvard University. During World War II, Kohs conducted the Army and Air Force bands at Fort Benning, Ga.; St. Joseph, Mo.; and Nashville. After the war he joined the faculty of Wesleyan University, where he taught composition from 1946 to 1948, and the Kansas City Conservatory, where he taught during the summers of 1946 and 1947.

He moved to California in 1948 and undertook teaching positions at the College of the Pacific and at Stanford University. He began teaching at USC in 1950 where he remained on the faculty for 38 years, serving as chairman of the music theory department for several years.

Kohs' stage works include Amerika (1969), an opera based on Kafka's novel; Lohiau and Hiiaka, a choreographed setting of a Hawaiian legend; and incidental music for Shakespeare's Macbeth (1947). His orchestral works include a Concerto for Orchestra (1942), a Cello Concerto (1947), a Violin Concerto (1980) and two Symphonies (1950 and 1957). His vocal works included settings of Navajo songs and The Lord Ascendant, based on The Epic of Gilgamesh. He also composed solo and chamber music. A recording of Kohs' music, including the Chamber Concerto, Passacaglia for Organ and Strings, Toccata for Harpsichord or Piano, a Short Concert for String Quartet, and a Sonatina for Violin and Piano was released on Composers Recordings, Inc. His Chamber Concerto was also included on a 1953 Columbia Masterworks "Modern American Music Series" LP (ML 4492).

In addition to composing, Kohs wrote several music theory textbooks, including Music Theory, a Syllabus for Teacher and Student (1961), Musical Form: Studies in Analysis and Synthesis (1976), and Musical Composition: Projects in Ways and Means (1980). He died at a nursing home in Los Angeles.
