= Nancy Galbraith =

American composer

Nancy Galbraith (born 1951 in Pittsburgh, Pennsylvania) is an American postmodern/postminimalist composer. She is professor of composition at Carnegie Mellon University.

== Biography ==
Galbraith began playing piano at the age of four. She studied music at Ohio University (BM, 1972), West Virginia University (MM, 1978), and Carnegie Mellon University. She now (2021) teaches composition and music theory at Carnegie Mellon. She has had six works premiered with the Pittsburgh Symphony Orchestra and has a close relationship with the Mendelssohn Choir of Pittsburgh, who premiered her choral works Missa Mysteriorum and Requiem. She has had works commissioned from several Latin American ensembles. Her music is published in the United States by Subito Music, and internationally by Boosey & Hawkes.

She is the Vira I. Heinz Professor of Composition at Carnegie Mellon University

== Compositions ==
Note: This list is incomplete.

=== Orchestral works ===
- Morning Litany (1988)
- Danza de los Duendes (1992)
- Piano Concerto No. 1 (1995)
- A Festive Violet Pulse (1998)
- Tormenta del Sur (2001)
- De Profundis ad Lucem (2002)
- Fantasy for Orchestra (2003)

=== Vocal/choral works ===
- In Unity and Love (1997)
- Christ By Whose Death (1999)
- Missa Mysteriorum (1999)
- Magnificat (2002)
- Four River Songs (2002)
- God of Justice (2004)
- Requiem (2004)
- Sacred Songs and Interludes (2006)
- Two Emily Dickinson Songs (2007)
- Novena (2007)

=== Works for wind ensemble ===
- with brightness round about it (1993)
- Danza de los Duendes (1996)
- Wind Symphony No. 1 (1996)
- Elfin Thunderbolt (1998)
- Dream Catchers (1998)
- Concerto for Piano and Wind Ensemble (2000)
- Internal Combustion (2001)
- Washington's Landing (2006)
- Febris Ver

=== Chamber music ===
- Time Cycle (1984)
- Fantasia (1986)
- Into Light (1989)
- Aeolian Muses (1993)
- Incantation and Allegro (1995)
- Rhythms and Rituals (1995)
- String Quartet No. 1 (1996)
- Inquiet Spirits (String Quartet No. 2) (2000)
- Island Echoes (2000)
- Atacama Sonata (2001)
- Dos Danzas Latinas (2002)
- Of Nature (2003)
- Sonata for Bassoon and Piano (2004)
- String Quartet No. 3 (2005)
- Traverso Mistico (2006)
- Effervescent Aire (2012)
- Strange Travels (2013)
- Midnight Stirring (2014)
- Festive Overture for Cellos (2018)
- Blue Capriccio (2024)

=== Solo piano ===
- Haunted Fantasy (1979)
- Prelude for Piano (1986)
- Piano Sonata No. 1 (1997)
- Three Preludes for Piano (2011)

=== Organ works ===
- Cortege
- Litany
- Agnus Dei (adapted from her Mass)
- Christ By Whose Death
- Gloria Te Deum
- Prelude and Fugue (2007)
