= Chester Street =

Street in Belgravia, London

Coordinates: 51°29′58.75″N 0°8′58.27″W

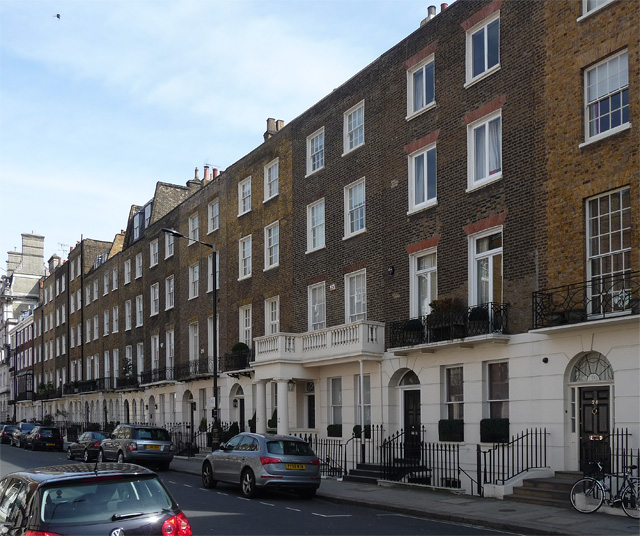
9-24 Chester Street, 2013

Chester Street is a street in central London's Belgravia district. It runs south-west to north-east from Upper Belgrave Street to Grosvenor Place.

== History ==
The poet Algernon Charles Swinburne was born at no 7 in 1837, the eldest of six children of Captain (later Admiral) Charles Henry Swinburne (1797–1877) and Lady Jane Henrietta, daughter of the George Ashburnham, 3rd Earl of Ashburnham.

The politician Alexander Perceval died at no 28 in 1859. The businessman and banker George Macaulay Booth was living in the same house in 1936.

The artist Frederick Yeates Hurlstone died at no 9 in 1869.

In 1920, John Godley, 3rd Baron Kilbracken was born in Chester Street.
