= Algimantas Bražinskas =

Lithuanian composer

Algimantas Bražinskas (Born in Vilkaviškis; 12 November 1937 – 29 January 2020) was a Lithuanian composer.

== Recordings ==
- Five Cuckoo Ballads (For A Capella Mixed Choir) 1985
