= Alexis Rannit =

Estonian poet, critic, and art historian

Alexis Rannit (born Alexey Konstantinovich Dolgoshev - Алексей Константинович Долгошев; Estonian: Aleksis Rannit; 14 October 1914 – 5 January 1985) was an Estonian poet, critic and literature researcher.

== Biography ==
He was born in Kallaste, in the Governorate of Livonia of the Russian Empire (nowadays in Tartumaa, Estonia). He spent his childhood in Saint Petersburg. In 1939, he graduated from the University of Tartu, where he studied applied arts. He conducted research on Lithuanian literature and personally knew many Lithuanian authors. From 1938 to 1940, he worked as a correspondent of the Riga newspaper Segodnya.

In 1940, he married Lithuanian opera singer Gražina Matulaitytė (1899–1993) and moved to Kaunas, where he worked until 1941 as a translator at the Kaunas State Drama Theatre, and later as a librarian at the Lithuanian National Library (until 1944).

In 1944, as the Red Army was approaching, Rannit emigrated to Germany, where he continued with his studies at the Institute of Applied Arts in Freiburg (1946–1950).

In 1953, he moved to the US and remarried. From 1954 to 1960, he worked as a librarian in the Art and Architecture division of the New York Public Library.

In 1956, he defended his master's thesis on arts history (annotated critical biography of Ciurlionis) at Columbia University in New York. He worked as a research fellow and curator of Slavic and Eastern European collections at the University of Yale. Rannit was an honorary doctor of a number of European (incl. Stockholm University), American and Korean universities. He was a founding member of International Association of Arts Critics, represented the Estonian authors at the PEN club, and was part of the editorial staff of Continent.

Аlexis Rannit died on 5 January 1985 at his home in New Haven, Connecticut.

== Works ==
Rannit started writing poems in Russian, and since 1930, wrote in Estonian. He translated Lithuanian poets' works into Estonian and published seven collections of poetry. His works have been translated into English, Russian, Hungarian, Lithuanian and German language.
