= Serge de Gastyne =

- Born: Serge Benoist de Gastyne; July 27, 1930
- Origin: Paris, France
- Died: July 24, 1992 (aged 61)
- Genre: Classical
- Occupations: Musician, composer, pianist, organist, teacher
- Instruments: Piano, organ

Serge Benoist de Gastyne (July 27, 1930 – July 24, 1992) was an American composer and pianist born in Paris, France. After fighting with the French Resistance forces in World War II, he came to the United States and attended the University of Portland (Oregon), where he received a Bachelor of Arts degree in 1950. He took further studies at the Eastman School of Music and also at the University of Maryland, where he was awarded Master of Music and Doctor of Music Arts degrees.

== Biography ==
Serge de Gastyne was born in Paris, France. Early in his teens, de Gastyne fought in the French Underground. He emigrated to the United States in 1947 where his dazzling piano-playing soon won him scholarship grants at the University of Portland and the Eastman School of Music. Between studies he sold encyclopedias, and earned enough to finance a cross-country trip by bus.

In 1952 he enlisted in the Air Force. He was assigned to the Composing and Arranging staff of the Air Force Band in Washington DC.

At Sampson Air Force Base near Rochester, New York (Major General Richard Lindsay commanding), he set out to compose a huge musical "panorama" celebrating the 50th anniversary of powered flight.

His musical compositions include symphonies, operas, and many pieces for band, voice and organ. He won awards for his compositions from the American Society of Composers, Authors and Publishers (ASCAP).

In 1968 he became a citizen of the United States. After studies at Eastman, he received a master's degree and a Doctorate in music from the University of Maryland.

He taught music at Northern Virginia Community College while serving in the Air Force. He rose to the rank of master sergeant. After retirement, he moved to Gulfport, Mississippi, where he lived for three years before his death on July 24, 1992.

Serge was buried at Arlington National Cemetery.

== Career ==
From 1953 to 1972, Serge was composer-in-residence with the U.S. Air Force Band and Orchestra in Washington, D.C. Concurrently he taught at Northern Virginia Community College, retiring in 1981. Serge was the artistic director and Resident Composer for the New Music Orchestra (Capitol Hill).

He wrote well over 100 original compositions, ranging from Chamber and Orchestral pieces (six commissioned Symphonies, a tone poem premiered by Leopold Stokowski, etc.), to many vocal works in different languages, compositions for band, chef d'oeuvre for organ and many mallet percussion pieces. He also wrote for unusual instrumental combinations of the above, for example, including a significant part for organ in his Symphony No. 4 for Band, reading of poetry in his Symphony No. 6, etc.

Serge's Four Musical Moments and Concerto for Trumpet were premiered by Emerson Head and Roy Hamlin Johnson, both professors of music at the University of Maryland at College Park. Emerson Head also premiered his Grand Duo Concertant at the University of Maryland, College Park.

His symphony, L'Ile Lumiere (Island of Light) was commissioned by Thor Johnson, Director of the Cincinnati Symphony, and performed by the orchestra in its 1956 season.

Serge was instrumental in the creation of the Music Department at the Bailey's Cross Roads campus of Northern Virginia Community College. He wrote seven symphonies as well as his Eclogae for soprano and orchestra.

Because of his professional position with the Air Force Symphony Orchestra in Washington, D.C. he is well known for his American Weekend March, which was commissioned by the American Weekend magazine. In addition, he also completed or collaborated on countless arrangements during his time in the Air Force.

Serge played the French Romantic organ during his early childhood days in Paris, a symphonic sound that generates a blaze of color and majesty in his monumental composition for organ, Cantique de Joie. Serge exuded a generosity of spirit and ruthlessness in equal measure. He was open to share basic aesthetic tenets. In particular, Cantique de Joie displays a spiritual connection. He seems to have a foot in the next world – a creative colossus at the peak of his powers with a particular Catholic spirituality translated into a religious idiom.

Cantique de Joie, Opus 70, was dedicated to Peter Basch and performed by him at Notre Dame Cathedral in Paris, on the V/153 Cavaillé-Coll (modified) in 1973. He wrote of his experience playing there: "The most exciting part for me was the entrance of the pedal triplets mid-way, like a pile driver pumping its way forward, a determined thrust and support to the upperwork that was crashing/exploding, aided by the dissonant chords cutting through the texture with a volcanic bombardment to the victorious final spread. And, that huge organ wrapped itself around me, like a tiger, and I will never, ever forget the entrance of the bombarde division when the console and tribune floor began to vibrate, making me think that I would bring down the entire balcony."

Serge is the subject of a book about himself and his half brother, Guy Geller, during their time under the Nazi regime in France. The book, entitled Here I Am! was written by Serge's mother, Louise Norman, and is available at the Holocaust Museum (Washington, D.C) and on Amazon.

== Selected works ==
- All/ Roverscio, for Medium Voice, Piano
- Aria Tenebrosa (Psalm 130), for Medium Voice and piano
- Bachiana (Nagyapa), for Piano
- Bist Du Bei Mir, for Choir
- Black is the Color of My True Love's Hair, for Male Chorus
- Cantique de Joie, for Organ
- Champ-De-Mars, for Piano
- Chanson Innocente (op.66), lyrics by e.e. cummings, for A Cappella Choir
- Chopiniana, for Piano

I Notre Dame
II Benison I
III Benison II
IV Sans-Souci

- Chopiniana II (B.G. 47), for Piano

Benison III
Del Fine
L'Aiglon
Schubertiade

- Csak Egy Kisl ny Szentirmay, for Piano
- Delaware Beethoven, for Medium Voice
- Delphic Hymn, for Medium Voice and Organ
- Deux Chansons Francaises, for Medium Voice, Flute and Vibraharp

A La Forest De Gastine, Lyrics by Pierre Ronsard,
Il Bacio, Lyrics by Paul Verlaine

- Etude (on a folk-song), for Piano
- Etude Folklorique, for Piano
- Etudiante, for Piano
- Exercise en Thorme, for Organ
- Fantasmagorie, for Piano
- La Caraffe de Plomb (after Palestrina), for Medium Voice and Piano
- Larghetto, for Medium Voice
- L'Íle Lumíère, for Medium Voice and Organ
- maggie and milly and molly and may, for Choir and Piano
- may my heart, for Medium Voice and Piano
- Menuet Très Antique, for Vibraharp
- Noel (for little children), for Choir and Flute
- Oak Hill (Op. 15-3G), for Piano
- Petite Rêverie, for Piano
- Prélude, for Piano
- Proem, for Piano
- Quodlibet, for Soprano, Tenor, and Bass, A Cappella
- Rondel, for Medium Voice and Vibraharp
- Saxophone Quartet (1968)
- Seven Bachianas, for Voice, Viola and Piano
- Speranza (Derry Air – Schubertiade XC), for Medium Voice and Piano
- String Quartet, Op. 67, No. 1
- Tres Morillas (Three Young Maidens), for High Voice and Piano
- Trittico Religioso, for Organ
- Two Elegies, for Medium Voice and Piano

The Last Words
The Sleeper of the Valley

- Vergiss-Mein-Nicht, for Medium Voice and Piano
