= Lloyd Ultan (composer) =

American composer (1929–1998)

Lloyd Ultan (New York City, June 12, 1929 – October 26, 1998) was an American composer of contemporary classical music.

== Career ==
Ultan received a bachelor's degree from New York University, a master's degree from Columbia University, and a doctorate from the University of Iowa. In 1971, he founded, and, from 1971 to 1974, served as Director of the Composer's Residency Program at Wolf Trap Farm Park in Vienna, Virginia.

Ultan served as chairman of the Department of Music at American University in Washington, D.C. for 13 years, and spent a year as visiting professor of Composition and Theory at the Royal College of Music in London. He has also lectured at Cambridge University and been a visiting composer on numerous college and university campuses in the United States.

He was a professor and chairman (and later emeritus professor and chairman) of composition, music theory, and electronic and computer music at the School of Music University of Minnesota, and also served as the Director of the Electronic/Computer Music Studio. He was responsible for founding the School of Music and served as its director from 1975 to 1986.

He composed over 60 works for a wide variety of genres including electronic music, solo and chamber works, and compositions for voice. His works have been performed and broadcast throughout the world, including in China and Taiwan. His works have been performed by the Tokyo String Quartet, the Pro Arte String Quartet, the Minnesota Orchestra, the St. Paul Chamber Orchestra, the Boston Symphony, William Blount, Alexander Braginsky, Young Nam Kim, Tanya Remenikova, and Thomas Murray. He has written numerous articles and a book, Music Theory: Compositional Problems and Practices in the Middle Ages and Renaissance (with an accompanying workbook/anthology).

Ultan's notable students include Edie Hill and Scott L. Miller.

Among his numerous fellowships, grants, and awards were a Rockefeller Foundation Residency Fellowship and three residencies at the MacDowell Colony, with a Norlin/MacDowell Outstanding Composer of the Year Award for 1982.

The 160-seat Lloyd Ultan Recital Hall at the University of Minnesota's School of Music (Donald N. Ferguson Hall) is named for him.

== Selected works ==
Orchestral

- Symphony No.2 (1961)

Concertante

- Carlisle Concerto for Piano and Orchestra (1958)
- Concerto for Organ and Chamber Orchestra (1979)
- Concerto for Violin and Orchestra (1982)
- Concerto for Cello and Orchestra (1990)

Chamber music

- Sonata for Cello and Piano (1962)
- String Quartet (1964)
- Quintet for Guitar and String Quartet (1966)
- 4 Children's Pieces for Violin and Piano (1969)
- Set for Four, Miniatures for Solo Flute (1973)
- Meditation for Harp and Flute (1975)
- Quintet for Brass and Piano (1975)
- Sonata for Bassoon and Piano (1975)
- Sonata for Viola and Piano (1976)
- Suite for Brass Quintet (1979)
- Dialogues II for Viola and Cello (1980)
- String Quartet No.2 (1980)
- Dialogues III for Violin and Viola (1982)
- String Trio (1985)
- Curved Mirrors for Oboe, Clarinet and Piano (1995)
- Monadnock Moods for Solo Clarinet (1995)
- Sonatine for Unaccompanied Bassoon (1997)

Vocal

- Epithalamium Brevis for Soprano (or Tenor), Violin, Viola and Cello
- Love's Not Time's Fool for Soprano, Violin and Viola (1995)
- Voices of the River for Soprano, Flute, Clarinet, Bassoon, Violin, Viola and Cello (1995)

== Books ==
- Ultan, Lloyd (1999). "Electronic Music: An American Voice." In Perspectives on American Music Since 1950, ed. James R. Heintze. Essays in American Music series, vol. 4. Garland Reference Library of the Humanities, vol. 1953. New York: Garland. ISBN 0-8153-2144-9.
- Ultan, Lloyd (1977). Music Theory: Compositional Problems and Practices in the Middle Ages and Renaissance. Minneapolis: University of Minnesota Press. ISBN 0-8166-0802-4.

== Discography ==
- Open Boundaries (with Mary Ellen Childs and Paul Schoenfield, out on Innova)
