= William Hurlstone =

English composer (1876–1906)

William Yeates Hurlstone (7 January 1876 – 30 May 1906) was an English composer. Showing brilliant musical talent from an early age, he died young, before his full potential could be realized. Nevertheless, he left behind an exquisite, albeit small, body of work. His teacher Sir Charles Villiers Stanford considered him the most talented of his pupils, above Ralph Vaughan Williams and Gustav Holst.

== Career ==
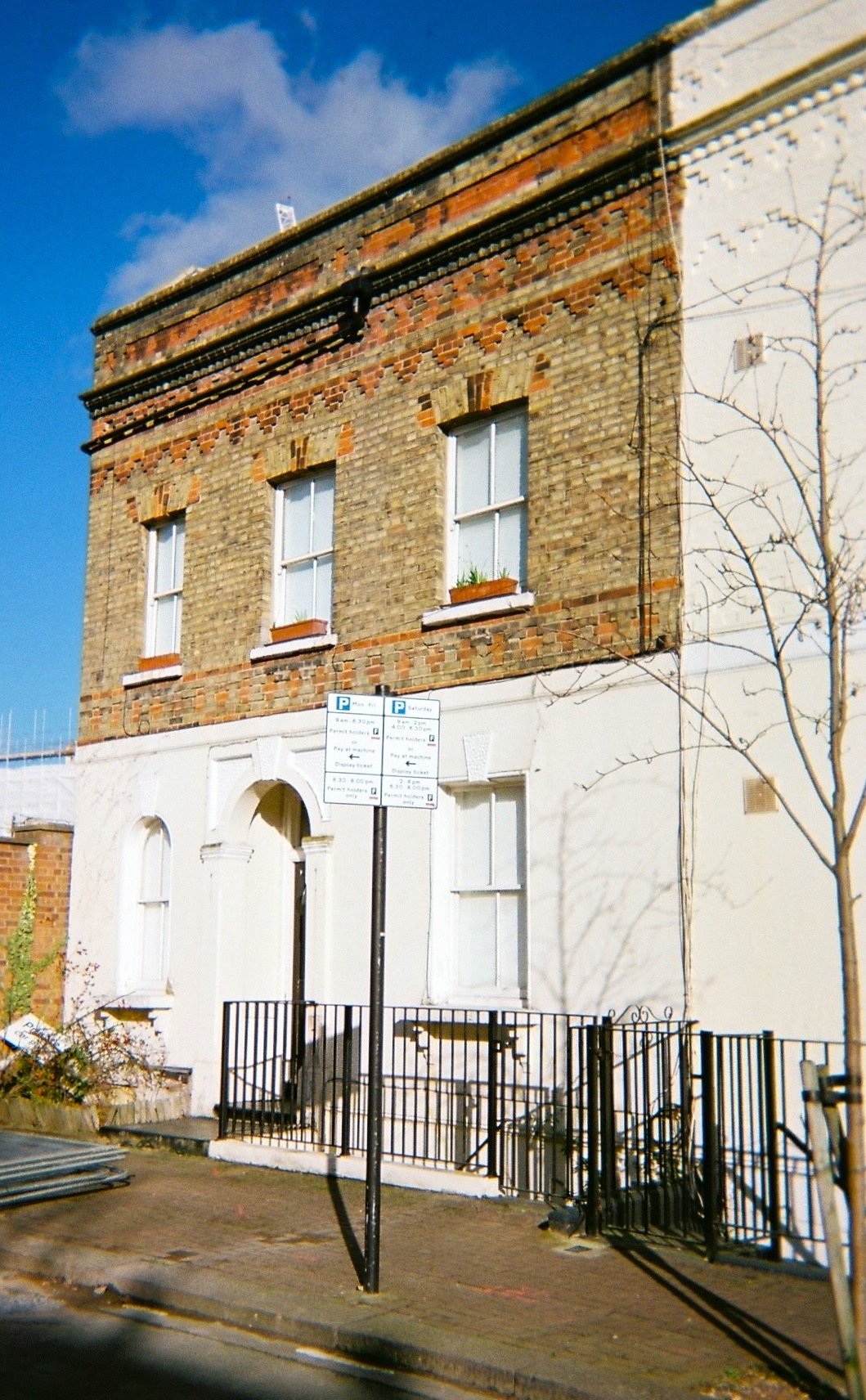
12 Richmond Gardens since renumbered at renamed Empress Place Fulham SW6, where Hurlstone was born in 1876

Born at 12 Richmond Gardens (now Empress Place), Fulham, on 7 January 1876, Hurlstone was the grandson of Frederick Yeates Hurlstone, president of the Royal Society of British Artists, and only son of the four children of Martin de Galway Hurlstone, a surgeon, by his wife Maria Bessy Styche, a piano teacher.

Hurlstone's earliest musical education was with his mother. In 1883 the family moved to Bemerton, a village near Salisbury where he became chorister in the local church, until his asthma prevented him from carrying on singing. The vicar was so impressed with him that he invited Hubert Parry and George Grove from the Royal College of Music to meet him. Parry told his parents that he was taken more by their son's grasp of the subject than by his abilities as an executant. Grove was amazed by the boy's capacity to identify chords played on the piano among other tests. Young William's earliest compositions for the piano were at age nine, and were so convincing that his father arranged for them to be published.

At age eighteen, two years after his father's premature death from smallpox, Hurlstone won a scholarship to study piano and composition at the Royal College of Music, after writing a Trio for Clarinet, Bassoon and Piano, performed at his local church. His piano professors in Croydon were Algernon Ashton and Edward Dannreuther. At the Royal College, his composition teacher, Sir Charles Villiers Stanford, considered Hurlstone to have been the most talented of the many brilliant students he taught. Those also included Ralph Vaughan Williams, Gustav Holst, Frank Bridge, John Ireland, Samuel Coleridge-Taylor and Haydn Wood.

After completing his studies Hurlstone settled in South Norwood to be near his family and worked as a piano teacher and choir master to help the family finances. He also taught at the Croydon Conservatoire. He retained links with Croydon for the rest of his life despite moving to Battersea to be nearer his work. The family suffered financial difficulties after their father, Martin, caught smallpox from one of his patients and went blind. He was obliged to give up his work and died shortly after in 1892. William was 16 years old. A musician friend of the family, named Beaumont, became their benefactor and saved them from penury.

In 1904 he was highly commended for Variations on a Swedish Air, performed at the first Patrons' Concert. In 1905 he won first prize in the Cobbett Competition for a single-movement String Quartet. One of his former teachers, Walford Davies, appointed him accompanist to the Bach Choir. In 1906, Hurlstone returned to the college, having been appointed Professor of Counterpoint, but died later that year of bronchial asthma, from which he had suffered all his life. He was 30 years old.

He is buried in Croydon Cemetery with members of his family. The monument over William's grave was designed as a broken column to signify that he had died before reaching his peak.

A street in South Norwood was named after Hurlstone; his mother had lived in Selhurst Road nearby as did his musician friend Samuel Coleridge-Taylor.

== Musical works ==
The greater part of Hurlstone's body of work consists of works for chamber ensembles. Although they are of consistently high quality, none achieved any great fame, but the Bassoon Sonata has become particularly popular along with the Characteristic Pieces for Clarinet and Piano. Among the better known are:

- Phantasie for String Quartet in A minor (published early 1905), which won first prize in the inaugural Cobbett Chamber Music Competition
- Piano Quartet in E minor, Op. 43;
- Piano Trio in G major, dating from 1905;
- Trio in G minor for clarinet, bassoon and piano; and
- Four Characteristic Pieces for clarinet and piano (Ballade, Croon Song, Intermezzo and Scherzo).

Additionally, he composed four instrumental sonatas for:

- piano solo (in F minor)
- violin and piano;
- cello and piano (in D major); and
- bassoon and piano (in F major).

There is also a Quintet in G minor for flute, clarinet, horn, bassoon and piano.

His orchestral works include

- Variations on a Swedish Air;
- Variations on a Hungarian Air;
- Variations on an Original Theme;
- Magic Mirror Suite (based on the fairy tale of Snow White); and
- a Piano Concerto in D major.

== Editions of his music ==
- Four Characteristic Pieces (B♭ clarinet and piano) Emerson Edition (Ref: E97)
- Quintet in G minor (flute, clarinet, bassoon, horn and piano; ed. Jonathan Kershaw 1998) Emerson Edition (Ref: E324)
- Scherzo (clarinet, bassoon and piano; missing movement from Trio in G minor; ed. Richard Moore) Emerson Edition (Ref: E404)
- Trio in G major (violin, cello and piano; published by Edition Silvertrust in 2008, Catalogue No. ES 2008–90)
- Trio in G minor (clarinet, bassoon, and piano; new complete edition 2006) Emerson Edition (Ref: E488) – This replaces the original Edition E62 (1982) which was found to contain many inaccuracies.
- Sonata in F (bassoon and piano) Emerson Edition (Ref: E75)

== Recordings ==
- Hurlstone: Chamber Works, Dutton Vocalion CDLX7128 (orig. 2003 – reissued 2013)
  - Piano Trio in G major
  - Adagio from Cello Sonata in D major (performed on viola)
  - Piano Quartet in E minor, Op. 43
- William Hurlstone: Orchestral Works, Lyrita SRCD208 (orig. 1993 – reissued 2006)
  - Variation sets on an Original Theme
  - Variation sets on a Hungarian Air
  - Magic Mirror Suite
- William Hurlstone: Piano Concerto etc, Lyrita SRCD2286 (orig. 1979, 1984 – reissued 2007)
  - Piano Concerto in D
  - Variations on a Swedish Air
  - Piano Quartet
  - Piano Trio
- The English Romantics – Works for Clarinet, Bassoon & Piano, Clarinet Classics CC0023 (1998)
  - Trio for Clarinet, Bassoon and Piano (1998 edition NOT the 2006 edition)
  - Four Characteristic Pieces
- Goossens, Hurlstone and Turnbull: Violin Sonatas, Somm SOMMCD031 (2003)
- Romantic Cello, Dutton Vocalion CDLX7102 (1999)
  - Cello Sonata
- Dale and Hurlstone: Piano Sonatas, Somm SOMMCD097 (2010)
- William Hurlstone: Complete Piano Music – Kenji Fujimura, Toccata Classics TOCC0289 (2015)
- Romantic Piano Trios – Trio Anima Mundi, Divine Art, DDA 25102 (2013)
  - Piano Trio in G major
- Romance and Reverie: Holst and his contemporaries, Albion ALBCD 065 (2024)
  - Four English Sketches
  - Reverie
  - Romance

== See also ==
- National Gramophonic Society

== Sources ==
- Corder, Frederick (1912). "Hurlstone, William Yeates" . In Lee, Sidney (ed.). Dictionary of National Biography (2nd supplement). London: Smith, Elder & Co.
- Graves, R. E.; Morales, Patricia. "Hurlstone, Frederick Yeates (1800–1869)". Oxford Dictionary of National Biography (online ed.). Oxford University Press. doi:10.1093/ref:odnb/14254. (Subscription, Wikipedia Library access or UK public library membership required.)
