= List of 21st-century classical composers =

This is a list of 21st-century classical composers, sortable by name, year of birth and year of death.

The list includes composers who have made classical music since 2001. The 21st century is defined by the calendar rather than by any unifying characteristics of musical style or attitude, and is therefore not an era of the same order as the classical or romantic. However, the century to date can be considered a continuation of the postmodern era that began during the 20th century and differs from the earlier modernist era in matters of attitude more than style.

== List ==
Name	Year of		Nationality	Notable 21st-century works	Remarks
Name	birth	death	Nationality	Notable 21st-century works	Remarks
Alma Deutscher	2005		English	The Sweeper of Dreams (opera); Cinderella (opera); Concerto for Violin and Orchestra in G; Piano Concerto in E-flat major	Female composer
Tarmo Peltokoski	2000		Finnish	Matka Maan Keskipisteeseen for Solo piano	
Ben Nobuto	1996		British-Japanese	Hallejuah Sim.	
Yihan Chen	1994		Chinese		
Conrad Tao	1994		American		
Grace-Evangeline Mason	1994		British		
Anna Appleby	1993		British	Drought (opera)	
Dani Howard	1993		British		
Diana Ringo	1992		Finnish		
Edward W. Hardy	1992		American	The Woodsman (Off-Broadway/ film); Three Pieces Inspired by Edgar Allan Poe; Nevermore, Evil Eye, A Fantasy (solo violin & string quartet); Evolution – The Evolution of Black Music (solo violin); Strange Fruit (string quartet/ film);	
Raymond Torres-Santos	1958		Puerto Rican	Jersey Polyphony; Millennium Symphony; Symphonia: Resonantia Luminosa Infinita; Triple Concerto for Violin, Cello, Piano and Orchestra	
Caio Facó	1992		Brazilian	Diário das Narrativas Fantásticas: Uma fantasia sobre a história da América do Sul (for chamber orchestra)	A major work about Latin American culture
Alex Prior	1992		British		
Christopher Bond	1992		British		
Peng-Peng Gong	1992		Chinese		
Roman Kim	1992		Kazakhstan	Violin Concerto No. 1, Dies Irae, I Brindisi	
Jacob Mühlrad	1991		Swedish	Kaddish (choir)	
Dylan Mattingly	1991		American		
Jay Greenberg	1991		American		
Daniil Trifonov	1991		Russian	Piano Concerto in E-flat minor, Rachmaniana	
Lucy Armstrong	1991		British		
Héloïse Werner	1991		French		
Alejandro Coello Calvo	1989		Spanish		
Arshia Samsaminia	1989		Iranian		
Koka Nikoladze	1989		Georgian		
Mehmet Erhan Tanman	1989		Turkish	The Traffic, for orchestra	
Liburn Jupolli	1989		Kosovar-Albanian		
Julia Adolphe	1988		American	viola concerto Unearth, Release	
Thomas Kotcheff	1988		American		
Andrew M. Boss	1988		American	Tetelestai; Alto Saxophone Concerto	
Nobuyuki Tsujii	1988		Japanese		
Sauli Zinovjev	1988		Finnish		
Carolina Eyck	1987		German		
Kathryn Salfelder	1987		American		
Anna Korsun	1986		Ukrainian	Ulenflucht	
Garth Neustadter	1986		American		
Kyle Bobby Dunn	1986		Canadian		
Trisdee na Patalung	1986		Thai		
Daniel Kidane	1986		British		
Natalie Draper	1985		American	Decadent Music Box; Timelapse Variations	Female composer
Roger Zare	1985		American	Fractal Miniatures	
Peter Van Zandt Lane	1985		American		
Timo Andres	1985		American		
Michael Vincent Waller	1985		American		
Francisco Coll García	1985		Spanish		
Patrick Greene	1985		American		
Samuel Carl Adams	1985		American		
Taylor Brook	1985		Canadian		
Mohammed Fairouz	1985		American		
Michael Waller	1985		American		
Sarah Hutchings	1984		American		Female composer
Andrew Cadima	1984		American		
Matthew Dewey	1984		Australian		
Robin Hoffmann	1984		German		
Dafina Zeqiri	1984		Kosovar		
Ann Cleare	1983		Irish	Claustrophobia (orchestra)	Female composer
Shaul Bustan	1983		Israeli		
Claudio Constantini	1983		Peruvian		
Ken Namba	1983		Japanese		
Jaime Reis	1983		Portuguese		
Andys Skordis	1983		Cypriot		
Ashley Fure	1982		American		
Dennis Tobenski	1982		American		
Joseph Twist	1982		Australian		
Caroline Shaw	1982		American	Partita for 8 Voices, Entr'acte, Plan and Elevation I-V	
Viviana Guzmán	1982		Chilean		
Joey Roukens	1982		Dutch		
Guðmundur Steinn Gunnarsson	1982		Icelandic		
Charlotte Bray	1982		British		
Gordon Hamilton	1982		Australian		
Gilad Hochman	1982		Israeli	Nedudim (Wanderings) for mandolin and string orchestra; A Voice in the Wilderness for orchestra; Whom My Soul Loveth for cello and mixed choir	
Sydney Guillaume	1982		Haitian-American		
Sahba Aminikia	1981		Iranian-American		
Hannah Lash	1981		American	Hush	Female composer
Wen Zhanli	1981		Chinese		
Helen Grime	1981		Scottish		
Nana Forte	1981		Slovenian		
Brice Catherin	1981		French		
Harold O'Neal	1981		American	Marvelous Fantasy; Piano Cinema; Marvleous Fantasy: Brave Living Dreams	
Alexandra du Bois	1981		American		
Samuel Andreyev	1981		Canadian	Vérifications; A propos du concert de la semaine dernère.	
Christophe Bertrand	1981	2010	French		
Alexandra Fol	1981		Bulgarian-Canadian		
Edward Manukyan	1981		Armenian-American		
Nico Muhly	1981		American	Dark Sisters (opera), Two Boys (opera)	
Shawn Okpebholo	1981		American		
Yoshiaki Onishi	1981		Japanese		
Vahram Sargsyan	1981		Armenian		
Johannes Kreidler	1980		German	Fremdarbeit	
Scott Perkins	1980		American	The Stolen Child	
Dobrinka Tabakova	1980		British/Bulgarian		
Anna Clyne	1980		British		
Michael Djupstrom	1980		American		
Cheryl Frances-Hoad	1980		English		
Abbie Betinis	1980		American		
Henrik Åström	1980		Swedish		
Wang Jie	1980		Chinese-born; American		
Larry Goves	1980		British		
Nazanin Aghakhani	1980		Austrian		
Iain Bell	1980		English		
Adam Fong	1980		American		
Sarah Nemtsov	1980		German		
Adam Schoenberg	1980		American	Finding Rothko, Picture Studies, Loosing Earth	
Man-Ching Donald Yu	1980		Chinese (Hong Kong)	First Symphony For Orchestra	
Andy Akiho	1979		American		
Emily Howard	1979		English		
Nicholas Vasallo	1979		American		
Marcus Paus	1979		Norwegian		
Mark Bowden	1979		British		
Andrew Norman	1979		American	The Companion Guide to Rome; Play; Split; Sustain	
Joseph Hallman	1979		American		
Ivana Kiš	1979		Croatian		
Nicolas Gilbert	1979		Canadian		
Sampo Haapamäki	1979		Finnish		
Gianluca Cascioli	1979		Italian		
Kirsten Broberg	1979		American		
Matthew Barnson	1979		American		
Kate Moore	1979		Australian		
Eoin O'Keeffe	1979		Irish		
Nélida Béjar	1979		Spanish		
Miguel Álvarez-Fernández	1979		Spanish		
Benjamin C. S. Boyle	1979		American		
Mehdi Hosseini	1979		Iranian	Concerto for String Quartet and Chamber Orchestra	
Vito Žuraj	1979		Slovenian	Blühen	
Marios Joannou Elia	1978		Cypriot	Autosymphonic – Multimedia Symphony, Ulmer Oratorium – Oratorio for 10 soloists, 2 orchestras, 7 choirs, etc.	
David T. Little	1978		American	Soldier Songs, Dog Days, The Descanso Cycle	
Martin Kennedy	1978		American		
Eric Knechtges	1978		American		
Daniel Hensel	1978		German		
Luke Bedford	1978		British		
Frans Ben Callado	1978		Colombian-Québécois		
Oliver Weeks	1978		English		
Benjamin Staern	1978		Swedish		
Jimmy López	1978		Peruvian	Fiesta!, Bel Canto	
Chris Opperman	1978		American		
Tarik O'Regan	1978		British-American	Heart of Darkness	
Lev Zhurbin	1978		Russian		
Britta Byström	1977		Swedish	Der Vogel der Nacht; Picnic at Hanging Rock; A Walk After Dark	Female composer
Joel Puckett	1977		American	The Fix (opera), The Shadow of Sirius	
Karola Obermueller	1977		German		Female composer
Mason Bates	1977		American	The (R)evolution of Steve Jobs (opera), Philharmonia Fantastique	
Jesús Elías	1977		Bolivian		
Santa Ratniece	1977		Latvian		Female composer
Gareth Williams	1977		Irish		
Aleksandr Shymko	1977		Ukrainian		
Anna S. Þorvaldsdóttir	1977		Icelandic		
Joseph Dangerfield	1977		American		
Jimmie LeBlanc	1977		Canadian		
Eres Holz	1977		Israeli		
Kasia Glowicka	1977		Polish		
Raven Chacon	1977		American	Inhale/Exhale	
Cristian Carrara	1977		Italian	Vivaldi. In memoriam; Magnificat	
Jean-Pascal Chaigne	1977		French		
David Flynn	1977		Irish		
Dai Fujikura	1977		Japanese		
DaeSeob Han	1977		South Korean		
Huck Hodge	1977		American		
Yugo Kanno	1977		Japanese	JoJo's Bizarre Adventure, Batman Ninja	
Frederik Magle	1977		Danish	Cantabile (symphonic suite), The Fairest of Roses (two trumpets and organ)	
César de Oliveira	1977		Portuguese		
Jennifer Thomas	1977		American	Winter Symphony (Jennifer Thomas album)	Female composer
Du Yun	1977		Chinese-American	Angel's Bone	
Hèctor Parra	1976		Spanish		
Kimiko Douglass-Ishizaka	1976		German		Female composer
Cassandra Miller	1976		Canadian	About Bach (string quartet)	
Marko Nešić	1976		Serbian		
Simon Steen-Andersen	1976		Danish		
Mark Aanderud	1976		Mexican		
Tróndur Bogason	1976		Faroese		
Andrea Reinkemeyer	1976		American		
Huang Ruo	1976		Chinese-born; American	An American Soldier (opera)	
Aaron Cassidy	1976		American		
Wang Ying	1976		Chinese		
Nicholas Vines	1976		Australian		
Tomi Räisänen	1976		Finnish		
Ali Ahmadifar	1976		Iranian		
Svitlana Azarova	1976		Ukrainian-Dutch	Opera Momo and the Time Thieves	
Michael Vincent	1976		Canadian		
Jonne Valtonen	1976		Finnish		
Daniel Kellogg	1976		American		
Stuart MacRae	1976		Scottish		
Merlijn Twaalfhoven	1976		Dutch		
Huw Watkins	1976		British		
D. J. Sparr	1975		American	Approaching Ali (opera), Katrina: Concerto for Jazz Guitar and Orchestra	Composer and Electric Guitarist
David Morneau	1975		American		
Andrew Chubb	1975		Australian		
Haraldur Vignir Sveinbjörnsson	1975		Icelandic		
Mohammed Haddad	1975		Bahraini		
David Alagna	1975		French		
Dan Shore	1975		American		
Oleksandr Rodin	1975		Ukrainian	ballets, opera Kateryna	
Matthew Shlomowitz	1975		Australian		
Bongani Ndodana-Breen	1975		South African		
Alen Ilijic	1975		Serbian		
Edward Eicker	1975		American		
Olesya Rostovskaya	1975		Russian		
Ed Bennett	1975		Irish		
Steingrimur Rohloff	1975		Icelandic German		
Juan Manuel Abras	1975		Swedish-Argentine		
Kati Agócs	1975		Canadian		
Vijay Antony	1975		Indian		
Richard Beaudoin	1975		American		
Oscar Bianchi	1975		Italian and Swiss		
Tim Benjamin	1975		Anglo-French		
Avner Dorman	1975		Israeli		
Peter Gilbert	1975		American		
David Philip Hefti	1975		Swiss		
Márton Illés	1975		Hungarian		
Paul Mealor	1975		Welsh		
Gabriel Prokofiev	1975		British		
Patrick Saint-Denis	1975		Canadian		
Dino Rešidbegović	1975		Bosnia and Herzegovina	X O Pt. II, Subtractive study for sound synthesizers and ensemble	electronic music, experimental music
Đuro Živković	1975		Serbian-Swedish		
Anne Vanschothorst	1974		Dutch		
Ehesuma	1974		Chinese		
Peter Traub	1974		American		
Terry Lowry	1974		American		
Erin Gee	1974		American		
Vitalij Kuprij	1974		Ukrainian-American		
Enrico Chapela	1974		Mexican		
Elena Langer	1974		Russian-born British		Female composer
Scott Slapin	1974		American		
David Ludwig	1974		American		
Matthew Jones	1974		British		
Aaron Novik	1974		American		
Inés Medina-Fernández	1974		Spanish		
Miguel Gálvez-Taroncher	1974		Spanish		
James Fei	1974		Taiwanese		
Andrew Lockington	1974		Canadian		
Bruno Mantovani	1974		French		
David Laganella	1974		American		
Orit Wolf	1974		Israeli		
Nicholas Anthony Ascioti	1974		American		
Derek Charke	1974		Canadian		
Julian Cochran	1974		Australian		
Ramin Djawadi	1974		German		
Panayiotis Kokoras	1974		Greek		
Samuel Robles	1974		Panamanian		
Dean Rosenthal	1974		American		
Ian Vine	1974		British		
Jennifer Walshe	1974		Irish		
Harris Wulfson	1974	2008	American		
Sophie Viney	1974		English	Missing God, Sonatina in 7 and 5	Female composer
Žibuoklė Martinaitytė	1973		Lithuanian		
Airat Ichmouratov	1973		Russian-Canadian	String Octet "Letter from an Unknown Woman" Op.56 after Stefan Zweig's novella	
Jorge Villavicencio Grossmann	1973		Peruvian		
Reynold Tharp	1973		American		
Kristin Kuster	1973		American		Female composer
James Lavino	1973		American		
Narong Prangcharoen	1973		Thai		
J. Ryan Garber	1973		American	Parabolisms; Resonances	
Gil Shohat	1973		Israeli	The Child Dreams, opera	
Jono El Grande	1973		Norwegian		
Kenji Bunch	1973		American		
Chañaral Ortega-Miranda	1973		Chilean		
Henry Vega	1973		American		
Michel Petrossian	1973		French		
Füsun Köksal	1973		Turkgish		
Sungji Hong	1973		South Korean		
Mindia Khitarishvili	1973		Georgian		
Carsten Bo Eriksen	1973		Danish		
Kurt Doles	1973		American		
Lera Auerbach	1973		Russian-American		
Tansy Davies	1973		British		
Søren Nils Eichberg	1973		German-Danish		
Róbert Gulya	1973		Hungarian		
Nihad Hrustanbegovic	1973		Bosnian		
John Mackey	1973		American	Redline Tango; Wine-Dark Sea	primarily composes for concert band
Matteo Marchisano-Adamo	1973		American		
Damien Ricketson	1973		Australian		
Jörg Widmann	1973		German	Das Gesicht im Spiegel; Babylon; Con brio; Arche; Partita; Viola Concerto; Violin Concerto No. 2; Towards Paradise; Friedenskantate; Horn Concerto	
Raymond Yiu	1973		Hong Kong-British		
Kristoffer Zegers	1973		Dutch		
Andrew March	1973		English	Sanguis Venenatus	
Klas Torstensson	1972		Swedish		
Amber Ferenz	1972		American		
Yasunori Mitsuda	1972		Japanese		
Mina Kubota	1972		Japanese		
Monty Adkins	1972		British		
Dan Coleman	1972		American		
Steven Bryant	1972		American	Ecstatic Waters, Concerto for Wind Ensemble	
Albert Schnelzer	1972		Swedish		
Octavio Vázquez	1972		Spanish		
Analia Llugdar	1972		Argentine		
Tomomi Adachi	1972		Japanese		
Vito Palumbo	1972		Italian		
Natasha Barrett	1972		British		
Rodrigo Cadiz	1972		Chilean		
Gabriela Lena Frank	1972		American		
Hiba Kawas	1972		Lebanese		
Lei Liang	1972		Chinese-born; American		
Carter Pann	1972		American	Slalom, The Mechanics (sax quartet)	
Kevin Puts	1972		American	The Hours (opera), Silent Night (opera), Contact	
André Ristic	1972		Canadian		
Edward Top	1972		Dutch		
Jacopo_Baboni-Schilingi	1971		Italian-born French		
Martin Lohse	1971		Danish		
Xavier Pagès i Corella	1971		Spanish		
Alejandro Román	1971		Spanish		
Marcel Chyrzyński	1971		Polish		
James Romig	1971		American		
Yoshino Aoki	1971		Japanese		
Guto Puw	1971		Welsh		
Takatomi Nobunaga	1971		Japanese	String Quartet	
Matthias Pintscher	1971		German		
Olga Hans	1971		Polish		
Luciano Chessa	1971		Italian		
Garrett Byrnes	1971		American		
Leilei Tian	1971		Chinese		
Richard Carrick	1971		American		
Klaus Lang	1971		Austrian		
Daniel Giorgetti	1971		British		
Aleksandar Kobac	1971		Serbian		
Jason Eckardt	1971		American		
Thomas Adès	1971		British	The Tempest	
Peter Askim	1971		American		
Richard Causton	1971		British		
Carlo Forlivesi	1971		Italian		
Bernhard Gál	1971		Austrian		
Jonny Greenwood	1971		British		
Michael Hersch	1971		American		
Paweł Mykietyn	1971		Polish	3 for 13	
Lior Navok	1971		Israeli		
Jesper Nordin	1971		Swedish		
Marco Oppedisano	1971		American		
Andrea Lorenzo Scartazzini	1971		Swiss	operas	
Volker Ignaz Schmidt	1971		German		
Joby Talbot	1971		British		
Hannes Taljaard	1971		South African		
Craig Walsh	1971		American		
Jason Wright Wingate	1971		American		
Yitzhak Yedid	1971		Israeli-Australian		
Evgeny Kissin	1971		Russian, British, Israeli	Tango, Meditation, Intermezzo, Toccata, Violoncello Sonata, String Quartet	
Gabriela Montero	1970		Venezuelan	Ex Patria, Op. 1 "In memoriam"; Piano Concerto No. 1 "Latin"	
Michel van der Aa	1970		Dutch	Up-Close; the Here trilogy	
Fred Momotenko	1970		Russian Dutch		
Dario Palermo	1970		Italian	Discombobulator; The Difference Engine	
Anton Rovner	1970		Russian-American		
Ralph Farris	1970		American		
Michael Sidney Timpson	1970		American		
Bjørn Bolstad Skjelbred	1970		Norwegian		
Nathaniel Stookey	1970		American	YTTE, Junkestra, The Composer Is Dead	
James Matheson	1970		American	Violin Concerto, String Quartet, True South, Cretic Variations	
Ivan Iusco	1970		Italian-American		
Daniel Felsenfeld	1970		American		
Ken Ueno	1970		American		
Mike McFerron	1970		American		
Liviu Marinescu	1970		Romanian		
Marzena Komsta	1970		Polish		
Chris Harman	1970		Canadian		
Robert Paterson	1970		American		
Dorothy Chang	1970		Canadian-American		
Louis Dufort	1970		Canadian		
Alberto Quintero	1970		Spanish		
Gustavo Díaz-Jerez	1970		Spanish		
Julian Wagstaff	1970		Scottish	The Turing Test (chamber opera), Breathe Freely (chamber opera)	
Aleksandra Vrebalov	1970		Serbian		
Will Todd	1970		English		
Desmond Gaspar	1970		Canadian		
Guillaume Connesson	1970		French		
Juan Sebastián Lach Lau	1970		Mexican		
Peter Boyer	1970		American		
Rodolfo Acosta	1970		Colombian		
Basil Athanasiadis	1970		Greek		
Esteban Benzecry	1970		Argentine		
David Bruce	1970		British	Gumboots	
Jonathan Cole	1970		British		
Graziella Concas	1970		Italian		
Donnacha Dennehy	1970		Irish		
David Horne	1970		Scottish		
Juan Sebastian Lach	1970		Mexican		
Chihchun Chi-sun Lee	1970		American		
Luigi Morleo	1970		Italian		
Joy Nilo	1970		Filipino		
Kumiko Omura	1970		Japanese		
Steven Reineke	1970		American		
Bernardo Sassetti	1970	2012	Portuguese		
Arlene Sierra	1970		American		
Fazıl Say	1970		Turkish	1001 Nights in the Harem, Istanbul Symphony	Piano symphony, Turkish music
Yann Tiersen	1970		French		
Eric Whitacre	1970		American	October; Sleep; Lux Aurumque; Deep Field	
Nimrod Borenstein	1969		British-French-Israeli	Concerto for violin and orchestra opus 60 (2013), Concerto for piano and orchestra opus 91 (2021), The Big Bang and Creation of the Universe opus 52 (2009), Etudes for piano opus 66 & opus 86	
Jóhann Jóhannsson	1969	2018	Icelandic	And in the Endless Pause There Came the Sound of Bees	
Martha Callison Horst	1969		American	Straussian Landscapes; Three Meditations on Van Gogh	Female composer
Scott McAllister	1969		American		
Jon Drummond	1969		Australian		
Bryn Harrison	1969		British	Repetitions in Extended Time	
Nicola Campogrande	1969		Italian		
Andrea Cera	1969		Italian		electroacoustic
Johanna Doderer	1969		Austrian		
Ciarán Farrell	1969		Irish		
Jocelyn Morlock	1969		Canadian		
Yannis Kyriakides	1969		Cypriot		
Elliott Miles McKinley	1969		American		
Victor Lazzarini	1969		Brazilian		
Karl Montevirgen	1969		American		
Beata Moon	1969		American		
Liu Shueh-shuan	1969		Taiwanese		
John Webb	1969		English		
Enno Poppe	1969		German		
Maria Grenfell	1969		Australian/New Zealand		
Sangidorjiin Sansargereltekh	1969		Mongolian		
Giovanni Allevi	1969		Italian		
James Francis Brown	1969		British		
Joshua Fineberg	1969		American		
Peter Fribbins	1969		British		
Tuomas Kantelinen	1969		Finnish		
Pierre Kolp	1969		Belgian		
Robert Voisey	1969		American		
Albert Patron	1969		Italian		
Roy Zu-Arets	1969		Israeli-American		
Victoria Borisova-Ollas	1969		Russian-Swedish	Symphony No. 1 The Triumph of Heaven; Golden Dances of the Pharaohs	Female composer
Bohdana Frolyak	1968		Ukrainian		Female composer
Jean-Louis Agobet	1968		French	Génération	
Ian Cresswell	1968		Australian		
Francisco Lara	1968		Spanish		
Jens Joneleit	1968		German		
Laura Andel	1968		Argentine		
Alwynne Pritchard	1968		British		
Michael Oesterle	1968		Canadian		
Ramon Lazkano	1968		Spanish		
Adrian Bawtree	1968		English		
Erran Baron Cohen	1968		British		
Andrea Ferrante	1968		Italian		
Darren Copeland	1968		Canadian		
Gordon Fitzell	1968		Canadian		
Shai Cohen	1968		Israeli		
Kenneth Hesketh	1968		British		
Ramón Humet	1968		Spanish		
Niklas Sivelöv	1968		Swedish		
Régis Campo	1968		French		
Matthew Hindson	1968		Australian		
James Clapperton	1968		Scottish		
Joe Cutler	1968		British		
Gareth Farr	1968		New Zealander		
Ikuko Kawai	1968		Japanese		
Johannes Kretz	1968		Austrian		
Vanessa Lann	1968		American		
Javier Torres Maldonado	1968		Mexican-Italian		
Olga Neuwirth	1968		Austrian		
Patrick Nunn	1968		British		
Roxanna Panufnik	1968		British	Silver Birch	
Boris Yoffe	1968		Russian-Israeli		
Evan Hause	1967		American		
Thomas Sandberg	1967		Danish		
Christian Hildebrandt	1967		Danish		
Giorgos Kyriakakis	1967		Greek		
Magali Babin	1967		Canadian		
Isidora Žebeljan	1967		Serbian		
Olli Mustonen	1967		Finnish		
Alberto Posadas	1967		Spanish		
Juan Pampin	1967		Argentine		
Moisès Bertran	1967		Spanish		
Wen-Pin Hope Lee	1967		Taiwanese		
Özkan Manav	1967		Turkish		
Jens Josef	1967		German		
Julian Anderson	1967		British		
Derek Bermel	1967		American		
Sansan Chien	1967	2011	Taiwanese		
Salvatore Di Vittorio	1967		Italian		
Amos Elkana	1967		Israeli	The Journey Home (opera)	
Deirdre Gribbin	1967		Northern Irish		
Alastair King	1967		British		
Matthew King	1967		British		
Andreas Kunstein	1967		German		
Paolo Longo	1967		Italian		
Pieter Snapper	1967		American		
Rebecca Saunders	1967		British		
Christopher Theofanidis	1967		American		
Katia Tiutiunnik	1967		Australian		Female composer
Jun Yamaguchi	1967		Japanese		
Hiroyuki Yamamoto	1967		Japanese		
Xu Yi	1967		Chinese		
Brian T. Field	1967		American		
Tanya Anisimova	1966		Russian		Female composer
Søren Sebber Larsen	1966		Danish		
Juan J. Colomer	1966		Spanish		
Carl Wittrock	1966		Dutch		
Jan Müller-Wieland	1966		German		
Wenchen Qin	1966		Chinese		
Larry Bitensky	1966		American		
Juan Carlos Tolosa	1966		Argentinian		
Nicholas Frances Chase	1966		American		
Kui Dong	1966		Chinese-American		
Roberto Carnevale	1966		Italian	""Linae""	
Juan Colomer	1966		Spanish		
Melissa Hui	1966		Canadian		
Andrey Kasparov	1966		Armenian-American		
Liza Lim	1966		Australian		
Harold Meltzer	1966		American		
Gráinne Mulvey	1966		Irish		
Paul Newland	1966		British		
John Psathas	1966		New Zealander		
Max Richter	1966		German		
Jon Schmidt	1966		American		
Vache Sharafyan	1966		Armenian		
Juan María Solare	1966		Argentine		
Donald Reid Womack	1966		American		
Alla Zahaikevych	1966		Ukrainian		
Dorothy Hindman	1966		American	R.I.P.T., Rough Ride	Female composer
Vangelis Petsalis	1965		Greek		
Sergio Blardony	1965		Spanish		
Thierry Escaich	1965		French		
Jonathan Little	1965		Australian		
Anton Batagov	1965		Russian		
Irina Bogushevskaya	1965		Russian		
Zana Clarke	1965		Australian		
Clara Petrozzi	1965		Peruvian		
Paul Steenhuisen	1965		Canadian		
Mats Wendt	1965		Swedish		
Peter Nardone	1965		Scottish		
Bernd Redmann	1965		German		
Alexandre Delgado	1965		Portuguese		
Rafael Leonardo Junchaya	1965		Peruvian		
Lindsay Vickery	1965		Australian		
Marc Sabat	1965		Canadian		
Robert Steadman	1965		British		
Richard Ayres	1965		British		
Carin Bartosch Edström	1965		Swedish		
Robert Davidson	1965		Australian		
Moritz Eggert	1965		German		
Rozalie Hirs	1965		Dutch		
Yuki Kajiura	1965		Japanese		
Hitomi Kaneko	1965		Japanese		
Yuri Khanon	1965		Russian		
Constantine Koukias	1965		Greek-Australian		
Georges Lentz	1965		Luxembourgish-Australian		
Lukas Ligeti	1965		Austrian		
Gordon McPherson	1965		Scottish		
Albena Petrovic-Vratchanska	1965		Bulgarian-Luxembourgish		
Veli-Matti Puumala	1965		Finnish		
Jay Schwartz	1965		American		
Georgia Spiropoulos	1965		Greek		
Charles Rochester Young	1965		American		
Bo Gunge	1964		Danish		
Roderick Watkins	1964		English		
Fiona Joy Hawkins	1964		Australian		
Carlos Sanchez-Gutierrez	1964		Mexican-American		
Marco Betta	1964		Italian		
Boris Böhmann	1964		German		
Gregers Brinch	1964		Danish		
Judy Dunaway	1964		American		avant-garde
Raffaele Marcellino	1964		Australian		
Matthew Taylor	1964		English		
Fabian Müller	1964		Swiss		
Ivan Moody	1964		English		
Gabriela Ortiz	1964		Mexican		
Brent Lee	1964		Canadian		
Nenad Firšt	1964		Slovenian		
Mark Engebretson	1964		American		
David del Puerto	1964		Spanish		
Carl Unander-Scharin	1964		Swedish		
Michael McGlynn	1964		Irish		
Jörgen Dafgård	1964		Swedish	Klarinettkonsert (2013)	
Jun Nagao	1964		Japanese		
Mark Andre	1964		French		
Luca Belcastro	1964		Italian		
Yorgos Foudoulis	1964		Greek		
Julia Gomelskaya	1964	2016	Ukrainian		
Yoko Kanno	1964		Japanese	Cowboy Bebop, Ghost in the Shell: Stand Alone Complex	
Andrea Molino	1964		Italian		
Javier Parrado	1964		Bolivian		
Osmo Tapio Räihälä	1964		Finnish	Barlinnie Nine	
Richard Rijnvos	1964		Dutch		
Örjan Sandred	1964		Swedish		
Yasuharu Takanashi	1964		Japanese		
Annette Schlünz	1964		German		
Augusta Read Thomas	1964		American		
Mariana Villanueva	1964		Mexican		
T. Edward Vives	1964		American		
Jordan Waring	1964		American		
Ian Wilson	1964		Irish		
Hikari Ōe	1963		Japanese		
Niels Marthinsen	1963		Danish		
Gastón Arce Sejas	1963		Bolivian		
Thomas Larcher	1963		Austrian		
Shinkichi Mitsumune	1963		Japanese		
Ann Millikan	1963		American		
Michael Zev Gordon	1963		British		
Sandeep Bhagwati	1963		Indian		
Keiko Fujiie	1963		Japanese		
Calliope Tsoupaki	1963		Greek		
John Pickard	1963		British		
Lucia Ronchetti	1963		Italian		
Fausto Romitelli	1963	2004	Italian		
Isabel Mundry	1963		German		
Roberto Molinelli	1963		Italian		
Sean O'Boyle	1963		Australian		
Veronika Krausas	1963		Canadian		
Henrik Hellstenius	1963		Norwegian		
Jaakko Mäntyjärvi	1963		Finnish		
Vasil Tole	1963		Albanian		
Svante Henryson	1963		Swedish		
Jean-Yves Malmasson	1963		French		
Sophie Lacaze	1963		French	Soupirs d'étoiles (Sighs of stars) for orchestra	
Christian Jost	1963		German		
Allison Cameron	1963		Canadian		
Philip Cashian	1963		British		
Evan Chambers	1963		American		
Graham Fitkin	1963		British		
Manuel Rocha Iturbide	1963		Mexican		
Philip Lasser	1963		American		
Nick Peros	1963		Canadian		
Elena Ruehr	1963		American		
Edson Zampronha	1963		Brazilian	Sonora, for ensemble	
Jonathan Elliott	1962		American		
David Crumb	1962		American		
Mark Adamo	1962		American		
Christopher Cook	1962		American		
Alexandros Mouzas	1962		Greek		
Iraida Yusupova	1962		Turkmenistani		Female composer
Abdalla El-Masri	1962		Lebanese Russian		
Ricardo Llorca	1962		Spanish		
Kaoru Wada	1962		Japanese		
Arne Eigenfeldt	1962		Canadian		
Carl Faia	1962		American		
P. Q. Phan	1962		Vietnamese		
Andersen Viana	1962		Brazilian		
Claus-Steffen Mahnkopf	1962		German		
Bettina Skrzypczak	1962		Polish		
Fredrik Sixten	1962		Swedish		
Émile Naoumoff	1962		Bulgarian		
Maria Newman	1962		American		
Wim Henderickx	1962		Belgian		
Eurico Carrapatoso	1962		Portuguese		
Mary Finsterer	1962		Australian		
Sylvia Constantinidis	1962		Venezuelan-American		
Surendran Reddy	1962	2010	South African		
Karim Haddad	1962		Lebanese		
Peter Copley	1962		British		
Victoria Poleva	1962		Ukrainian		
Rudi Spring	1962	2025	German		
Laura Schwendinger	1962		American		
Jeffrey Ryan	1962		Canadian		
Shih-Hui Chen	1962		Taiwanese		
Michael Abels	1962		American		
Mohamed Abdelwahab; Abdelfattah	1962		Egyptian		
Tevfik Akbaşlı	1962		Turkish		
Michael Alcorn	1962		Northern Irish		
William Anderson	1962		American		
Andrew Ager	1962		Canadian		
Ned Bouhalassa	1962		French Canadian		
Stefano Gervasoni	1962		Italian		
Jack Gibbons	1962		English	Ave Verum Corpus, Serenade for string orchestra	
Jennifer Higdon	1962		American		
Šarūnas Nakas	1962		Lithuanian		
Eric W. Sawyer	1962		American		
Alex Shapiro	1962		American		
Giovanni Sollima	1962		Italian		
Graham Waterhouse	1962		British	Der Handschuh, Rhapsodie Macabre, Zeichenstaub	
Ludmila Yurina	1962		Ukrainian		
Benjamin Yusupov	1962		Tajikistani		
Remilson Nery	1961		Brazilian		
Ivan Božičević	1961		Croatian		
Carolyn Yarnell	1961		American		Female composer
Edward Knight	1961		American		
Lynn Gumert	1961		American		Female composer
Morten Wedendahl	1961		Danish		
Jesús Rueda	1961		Spanish		
Kenneth Sivertsen	1961	2006	Norwegian		
Jonas Baes	1961		Filipino		
Sunleif Rasmussen	1961		Faroese		
Jake Heggie	1961		American	Dead Man Walking, Moby-Dick	
Nailia Galiamova	1961		Uzbekistani		
Erica Muhl	1961		American		
John Burge	1961		Canadian		
Igor Raykhelson	1961		Russian born American		
Gintaras Sodeika	1961		Lithuanian		
Helmut Oehring	1961		German		
Tony O'Connor	1961	2010	Australian		
Cecilia McDowall	1961		British		
Rytis Mažulis	1961		Lithuanian		
Ivo van Emmerik	1961		Dutch		
Stephen Hough	1961		British		
Michael Edward Edgerton	1961		American		
Karen Tanaka	1961		Japanese		
Paul Carr	1961		English		
Geoffrey Álvarez	1961		British/Nicaraguan		
Mehmet Okonsar	1961		Turkish-Belgian		
Lucio Gregoretti	1961		Italian		
Jorge Grundman	1961		Spanish	A Mortuis Resurgere: The Resurrection of Christ; Shoah for Solo Violin and Sacred Temple	
Marc-André Dalbavie	1961		French		
Matthias Dahms	1961		German		
Ana-Maria Avram	1961		Romanian		
Nicolas Bacri	1961		French	opus 72 Sinfonietta, for string orchestra; opus 75 Sonata No. 2 for violin and piano	
Unsuk Chin	1961		South Korean–German		
Brett Dean	1961		Australian		
Frank Felice	1961		American		
Daron Hagen	1961		American		
Marc-André Hamelin	1961		French Canadian	12 Études in All the Minor Keys, Variations on a Theme of Paganini, Circus Galop, Cathy's Variations, Toccata on L'homme armé, Little Nocturne, Con Intimissimo Sentimento, Solfeggietto a cinque, The Ring-Tone Waltz	
Hanna Kulenty	1961		Polish		
Petri Kuljuntausta	1961		Finnish		
Lowell Liebermann	1961		American		
Peter Machajdík	1961		Slovak	Namah	
Isabel Soveral	1961		Portuguese		
David Sawer	1961		British		
R. J. Stove	1961		Australian		
Mauricio Sotelo	1961		Spanish		
Michael Torke	1961		American		
Roman Turovsky-Savchuk	1961		Ukrainian-American		
Dimitri Voudouris	1961		Greek-South African		
Peter Seabourne	1960		English	Steps piano cycle series – 9 volumes	
Craig First	1960		American		
Yekaterina Chemberdzhi	1960		Russian		Female composer
Stewart Wallace	1960		American		
Pertti Jalava	1960		Finnish		
Christian Heim	1960		Australian		
Priti Paintal	1960		Indian		
Nathan Currier	1960		American		
Ivan Sokolov	1960		Russian		
Martino Traversa	1960		Italian		
Jocelyn Pook	1960		British		
Andrew Schultz	1960		Australian		
Anthony Ritchie	1960		New Zealander		
Wolfgang Plagge	1960		Norwegian		
Ben Moore	1960		American		
Julian Grant	1960		English		
Fabrizio De Rossi Re	1960		Italian		
Nigel Clarke	1960		British		
Fabio Cifariello Ciardi	1960		Italian		
Martin Butler	1960		English		
Fred Onovwerosuoke	1960		American		
Adrián Iaies	1960		Argentine		
Anna-Maria Ravnopolska-Dean	1960		Bulgarian		
Nils Henrik Asheim	1960		Norwegian		
André Werner	1960		German		
Sonia Bo	1960		Italian		
Haukur Tómasson	1960		Icelandic		
Yasuhide Ito	1960		Japanese		
Detlev Glanert	1960		German		
Maria de Alvear	1960		Spanish-German		
Dirk Brossé	1960		Flemish Belgian		
Django Bates	1960		British		
Jeremy Beck	1960		American		
George Benjamin	1960		British		
Dmitri Capyrin	1960		Russian		
Sidney Corbett	1960		American		
Paul Doornbusch	1960		Australian		
Gerald Eckert	1960		German		
Karlheinz Essl	1960		Austrian		
C. P. First	1960		American		
Osvaldo Golijov	1960		Argentine		
Annie Gosfield	1960		American		
Georg Hajdu	1960		Hungarian-German		
Kamran Ince	1960		Turkish-American		
Aaron Jay Kernis	1960		American		
Hanspeter Kyburz	1960		Swiss		
Claude Ledoux	1960		Belgian		
António Chagas Rosa	1960		Portuguese		
Alexander Shchetynsky	1960		Ukrainian		
Urmas Sisask	1960		Estonian		
Ivan Glebovich Sokolov	1960		Russian-German		
Pete Stollery	1960		British		
William Susman	1960		American		
J. G. Thirlwell	1960		Australian		
Mark-Anthony Turnage	1960		British		
Ezequiel Viñao	1960		Argentine-American		
Michael H. Weinstein	1960		Swiss-American		
Walter Werzowa	1960		Austrian		
Daniel Léo Simpson	1959		American		
Espen Selvik	1959		Norwegian		
Caroline Ansink	1959		Dutch		
Lee Santana	1959		American		
Ana Lara	1959		Mexican		
Lucio Garau	1959		Italian		
John Palmer	1959		British		
Adina Izarra	1959		Venezuelan		
Robert Ian Winstin	1959	2010	American		
John Oliver	1959		Canadian		
João Guilherme Ripper	1959		Brazilian		
Jorge Martín	1959		Cuban-American		
Stephen Leek	1959		Australian		
Willem Jeths	1959		Dutch		
James Harley	1959		Canadian		
Lawrence Dillon	1959		American		
Brent Michael Davids	1959		American		
Paul Coletti	1959		Scottish		
Ronald Caltabiano	1959		American		
David Hönigsberg	1959	2005	South African		
Sebastian Currier	1959		American		
Ilona Breģe	1959		Latvian		
Marti Epstein	1959		American		
Silvio Barbato	1959	2009	Italian-Brazilian		
Mats Lidström	1959		Swedish		
Peter Togni	1959		Canadian		
Victor Rasgado	1959	2023	Mexican		
Craig Armstrong	1959		Scottish		
Richard Barrett	1959		British	Dark Matter; Construction	
Carola Bauckholt	1959		German		
John Abram	1959		Anglo-Canadian		
Ratko Delorko	1959		German		
Jonathan Dove	1959		British		
Frédéric Durieux	1959		French		
Alfio Fazio	1959		Italian		
Vladimír Franz	1959		Czech		
Fergus Johnston	1959		Irish		
Vakhtang Kakhidze	1959		Georgian		
Shigeru Kan-no	1959		Japanese		
James MacMillan	1959		Scottish		
Steve Martland	1959	2013	British		
Simon Proctor	1959		British		
Stéphane Roy	1959		French Canadian		
Andi Spicer	1959	2020	British		
Erkki-Sven Tüür	1959		Estonian		
Theo Verbey	1959	2019	Dutch		
Stevie Wishart	1959		English Australian Belgian		
Norbert Wissing	1959	2019	Dutch		
Evan Ziporyn	1959		American		
Patrick Hawes	1958		English	The Great War Symphony, Highgrove Suite, Quanta Qualia	
Gregg Wager	1958		American		
Ståle Kleiberg	1958		Norwegian		
Consuelo Díez	1958		Spanish		Female composer
Maura Bosch	1958		American		
Jun Miyake	1958		Japanese		
Giulio Castagnoli	1958		Italian		
Sinta Wullur	1958		Indonesian-Dutch		
Mark Kilstofte	1958		Albanian		
Peter Reynolds	1958	2016	Welsh		
Andrew Paul MacDonald	1958		Canadian		
James Lentini	1958		American		
Michael Jarrell	1958		Swiss		
Hanna Havrylets	1958	2022	Ukrainian		
Ronan Guilfoyle	1958		Irish		
Suzanne Giraud	1958		French		
Zulema de la Cruz	1958		Spanish		
Violaine Prince	1958		French-Lebanese		
Kimmo Hakola	1958		Finnish		
Michael Ching	1958		American		
Nicolas Vérin	1958		French		
Levent Çoker	1958		Turkish		
Kjartan Ólafsson	1958		Icelandic		
Rafał Stradomski	1958		Polish		
Eve Beglarian	1958		American	The Bus Driver Didn't Change His Mind; FlamingO; Book of Days	
Neil Brand	1958		British		
Karl Gottfried Brunotte	1958		German		
Oscar van Dillen	1958		Dutch		
Hans-Ola Ericsson	1958		Swedish		
Howard Goodall	1958		British		
Simon Holt	1958		British		
Christian Lindberg	1958		Swedish	Helikon Wasp; Kundraan	
Magnus Lindberg	1958		Finnish	Clarinet Concerto	
Martín Matalon	1958		Argentine		
Mladen Milicevic	1958		Bosnia and Herzegovina / USA		electronic music film music experimental music sound installation
Riccardo Piacentini	1958		Italian		
Esa-Pekka Salonen	1958		Finnish		
Thomas Simaku	1958		Albanian		
Bent Sørensen	1958		Danish	Second Symphony	
Franz Surges	1958	2015	German		
Frank Ticheli	1958		American		
Errollyn Wallen	1958		Belizean-British		
Andrew Lowe Watson	1958	2021	British		
Nigel Westlake	1958		Australian		
Julia Wolfe	1958		American		
Akio Yasuraoka	1958		Japanese		
Jay Alan Yim	1958		American		
Roman Yakub	1958		Ukrainian-American		
Davide Zannoni	1958		Italian		
Juliana Hall	1958		American		
Steve Elcock	1957		English / French	Symphonies 2 – 10	
Daniel Doura	1957		Argentine	Visiones patagónicas, Sinfonía argentina, Sueños de verano	
Rand Steiger	1957		American		
Joan Szymko	1957		American		Female composer
Eric Mandat	1957		American		
Tapani Puranen	1957		Finnish		
Ivo Josipović	1957		Croatian		
Michael Glenn Williams	1957		American		
Miguel del Águila	1957		Uruguayan-born; American	Conga-line in hell, Salon Buenos Aires, Submerged The Giant Guitar, The Fall of Cuzco, Time and Again Barelas opera	Hispanic composer LGBTQ composer
Camille Kerger	1957		Luxembourg		
Kim Jin-hi	1957		South Korean		
Jorge Liderman	1957	2008	American		
Thomas Daniel Schlee	1957	2025	Austrian		
Gerhard Präsent	1957		Austrian		
Petros Shoujounian	1957		Armenian Canadian		
Claus Kühnl	1957		German	Voller Sonnen	
Elena Kats-Chernin	1957		Australian		
Ričardas Kabelis	1957		Lithuanian		
Regina Irman	1957		Swiss		
Lars Graugaard	1957		Danish		
Jiří Gemrot	1957		Czech		
Christian Eggen	1957		Norwegian		
James Clarke	1957		English		
Howard Bashaw	1957		Canadian		
Mikhail Pletnev	1957		Russian		
Helmut Christoferus Calabrese	1957		German		
Pan Shiji	1957		Taiwanese		
Guan Xia	1957		Chinese		
Rolf Wallin	1957		Norwegian		
Cong Su	1957		Chinese		
Michael Stöckigt	1957		German		
Linda Bouchard	1957		Canadian		
Masamichi Amano	1957		Japanese		
Gheorghi Arnaoudov	1957		Bulgarian		
Charles Roland Berry	1957		American		
Keith Burstein	1957		British		
Mary Ellen Childs	1957		American		
Chaya Czernowin	1957		Israeli		
Alexandre Danilevsky	1957		Russian-French		
Andrew Ford	1957		English-Australian		
Ellen Fullman	1957		American		
Hendrik Hofmeyr	1957		South African		
Luc van Hove	1957		Belgian		
Ulf Långbacka	1957		Finland-Swedish		
Richard Karpen	1957		American		
Kenji Kawai	1957		Japanese		
John Kenny	1957		British		
Douglas Knehans	1957		American		
Bernhard Lang	1957		Austrian		
David Lang	1957		American		
Paul Moravec	1957		American		
Zurab Nadareishvili	1957		Georgian		
Hilda Paredes	1957		Mexican		
Francis Pott	1957		British		
Mikel Rouse	1957		American		
Marcela Pavia	1957		Argentinean-American		
Linda Catlin Smith	1957		American		
Rudi Tas	1957		Belgian		
Paul Terracini	1957		Australian		
Tan Dun	1957		Chinese		
Melinda Wagner	1957		American		
Janet Wheeler	1957		British		
Amaury du Closel	1956	2024	French	Stolpersteine	
David Chesky	1956		American	The Mice War (opera); The Venetian Concertos	
Carolyn Steinberg	1956		American		Female composer
Laura Kaminsky	1956		American		Female composer
Patrick Cassidy	1956		Irish	Vide Cor Meum, The Children of Lir, Dante Opera	
Jeff Hamburg	1956		American		
Deborah Drattell	1956		American		Female composer
Tom Cipullo	1956		American		
John Howell Morrison	1956		American		
Oliver Schroer	1956	2008	Canadian		
Leon Milo	1956	2014	American		
Thomas Pernes	1956	2018	Austrian		
Iris ter Schiphorst	1956		German		
Andy Vores	1956		Welsh		
Carla Scaletti	1956		American		
Marie Samuelsson	1956		Swedish		
Madeleine Isaksson	1956		Swedish		
Michelle Ekizian	1956		American		
Anne Dudley	1956		English		
Chiara Benati	1956		Italian		
László Tihanyi	1956		Hungarian		
Iris Szeghy	1956		Slovak		
Stefano Scodanibbio	1956	2012	Italian		
Philip Maneval	1956		American		
Rolf Martinsson	1956		Swedish		
John Lunn	1956		British		
Harold Levin	1956		American		
Carlos Grätzer	1956		Argentine		
Philip Grange	1956		English		
Luca Francesconi	1956		Italian		
Daniel Dorff	1956		American		
Richard Danielpour	1956		American		
William Beauvais	1956		Canadian		
Normand Corbeil	1956	2013	Canadian		
Eryck Abecassis	1956		Algerian		
John Harle	1956		English		
Benet Casablancas	1956		Spanish		
James Biery	1956		American		
Larysa Kuzmenko	1956		Canadian		
Steen Pade	1956		Danish		
Makiko Kinoshita	1956		Japanese		
Guo Wenjing	1956		Chinese		
Eduardo Alonso-Crespo	1956		Argentine		
Javier Álvarez	1956	2023	Mexican		
Sally Beamish	1956		British		
Tim Brady	1956		Canadian		
Paul Dolden	1956		Canadian		
Dror Elimelech	1956		Israeli		
Eve de Castro-Robinson	1956		New Zealander		
John Frandsen	1956		Danish		
Miguel Frasconi	1956		American		
Kenneth Fuchs	1956		American		
Vladimír Godár	1956		Slovak		
Michael Gordon	1956		American		
Mark Gresham	1956		American		
Jouni Kaipainen	1956	2015	Finnish		
Graeme Koehne	1956		Australian		
Steven Mackey	1956		American		
Onutė Narbutaitė	1956		Lithuanian		
Martijn Padding	1956		Dutch		
Carlo Pedini	1956		Italian		
Pierre Pincemaille	1956	2018	French		
Jan Van der Roost	1956		Belgian		
Thomas Sleeper	1956	2022	American		
Laurence Traiger	1956		American		
Gast Waltzing	1956		Luxembourg		
Craig Bohmler	1956		American		opera, art songs
Hans Kockelmans	1956		Dutch		
Carter Larsen	1955		American		He has composed a wide variety of concert works (Solo Piano, Two Pianos, Piano and Orchestra, Instrumental) as well as music for theater and film.
Jerome Kitzke	1955		American		
Masguda Shamsutdinova	1955		Russian		Female composer
Kenneth Frazelle	1955		American		
Diego Luzuriaga	1955		Ecuadorian		
Janika Vandervelde	1955		American		Female composer
David Conte	1955		American		
Gerda Geertens	1955		Dutch		
Iryna Kyrylina	1953	2017	Ukrainian		
Simon Shaheen	1955		Palestinian-American		
Jukka Linkola	1955		Finnish		
Pedro Luís Neves	1955		Portuguese		
Michael Obst	1955		German		
Olli Kortekangas	1955		Finnish		
David A. Jaffe	1955		American		
Mark Edgley Smith	1955	2008	British		
Karmella Tsepkolenko	1955		Ukrainian		
Jeffrey Mumford	1955		American		
Gérard Pape	1955		American		
Vyacheslav Kuznetsov	1955		Belarusian		
Juraj Filas	1955	2021	Slovak		
Eleanor Joanne Daley	1955		Canadian		
Krassimir Taskov	1955		Bulgarian		
Bruce Adolphe	1955		American		
Kiril Lambov	1955	2019	Bulgarian		
Daniel W. McCarthy	1955		American		
Paul Edwards	1955		English		
Dušan Bogdanović	1955		Serbian-born American		
Dieter Lehnhoff	1955		Guatemalan		
Behzad Ranjbaran	1955		Persian		
Jacques Burtin	1955		French		
Ofer Ben-Amots	1955		Israeli-American		
Byron Adams	1955		American		
Denys Bouliane	1955		French Canadian		
Eric Chasalow	1955		American		
Bob Chilcott	1955		British		
Michael Denhoff	1955		German		
Leonid Desyatnikov	1955		Russian		
Pascal Dusapin	1955		French		
Roland Dyens	1955	2016	French		
Susanne Erding-Swiridoff	1955		German		
Ludovico Einaudi	1955		Italian		
Mamoru Fujieda	1955		Japanese		
Kyle Gann	1955		American		
Naji Hakim	1955		Lebanese-French		
Toshio Hosokawa	1955		Japanese		
Yuri Kasparov	1955		Russian-Armenian		
Nigel Keay	1955		New Zealander		
Bernardo Kuczer	1955		Argentinian		
Robert Normandeau	1955		Canadian		
Bright Sheng	1955		Chinese-American		
Tibor Szemző	1955		Hungarian		
Vladimir Tarnopolsky	1955		Russian		
Víctor Varela	1955		Venezuelan-Swedish		
Ian Venables	1955		British		
Wang Hesheng	1955		Chinese		
Ye Xiaogang	1955		Chinese		
Robert Aldridge	1954		American	opera Elmer Gantry	
Carlo Alessandro Landini	1954		Italian		
Timothy Sullivan	1954		Canadian		
Phil Nyokai James	1954		American		
Jessica Suchy-Pilalis	1954		American		Female composer
David Balakrishnan	1954		American		
Robert Greenberg	1954		American		
Niels Eje	1954		Danish		
German Cáceres	1954		Salvadoran		
Hi Kyung Kim	1954		South Korean		
Stephen Jaffe	1954		American		
Denise Kelly	1954		Irish		
Phillip Houghton	1954	2017	Australian		
Renata Kunkel	1954		Polish		
Richard Blackford	1954		English		
Cecilie Ore	1954		Norwegian		
Irina Hasnaș	1954		Romanian		
Birgit Havenstein	1954		German		
Susan Frykberg	1954	2023	New Zealander		
María Escribano	1954	2002	Spanish		
René Wohlhauser	1954		Swiss		
Niels Rosing-Schow	1954		Danish		
Betty Olivero	1954		Israeli		
Steven Sametz	1954		American		
Eric Moe	1954		American		
Barrington Pheloung	1954	2019	Australian		
Ella Milch-Sheriff	1954		Israeli		
Benedict Mason	1954		British		
Pamela J. Marshall	1954		American		
Richard Ingham	1954		Scottish		
Orlando Jacinto Garcia	1954		Cuban-American		
James Fulkerson	1954		American		
Chan Wing-wah	1954		Chinese (Hong Kong)		
Șerban Nichifor	1954		Romanian		
Gilles Gobeil	1954		Canadian		
John Musto	1954		American		
Daniel Bukvich	1954		American		
Oliver Kentish	1954		British		
Elliot Goldenthal	1954		American		
Kenneth Atchley	1954		American		
Robert Beaser	1954		American		
Sylvie Bodorová	1954		Czech		
Elisabetta Brusa	1954		Italian		
Lam Bun-Ching	1954		Chinese		
Robert Carl	1954		American		
Michael Daugherty	1954		American		
Joël-François Durand	1954		French	Athanor; String Quartet; Concerto for piano and orchestra	
Eric Ewazen	1954		American		
Beat Furrer	1954		Austrian		
Anders Hillborg	1954		Swedish		
Joseph-François Kremer	1954		French		
Gary Kulesha	1954		Canadian		
Paulo Costa Lima	1954		Brazilian		
Chiel Meijering	1954		Dutch		
Elizabeth Hayden Pizer	1954		American		
Tobias Picker	1954		American		
Larry Polansky	1954		American		
Andrew Poppy	1954		British		
Sergio Rendine	1954	2023	Italian		
Arturo Rodas	1954		Ecuadorian-French		
Jan Sandström	1954		Swedish		
Sinan Savaskan	1954		British		
Henrik Strindberg	1954		Swedish		
Paweł Szymański	1954		Polish		
Pedro Vilarroig	1954		Spanish		
Carl Vine	1954		Australian		
Judith Weir	1954		British		
John Woolrich	1954		British		
Yanni	1954		Greek-American		
Allen Cohen	1951		American		
Sorin Lerescu	1953		Romanian		
Arthur Levering	1953		American		
Larry Hochman	1953		American		
Miguel Roig-Francolí	1953		Spanish/American		
Victor Kissine	1953		Russian		
Henk de Vlieger	1953		Dutch		
Cynthia Cozette Lee	1953		American		
Wendy Mae Chambers	1953		American		
Avril Anderson	1953		English		
Roger Bellon	1953		French		
Josefina Benedetti	1953		American		
Susan Morton Blaustein	1953		American		
David Felder	1953		American		
Jody Diamond	1953		American		
He Xuntian	1953		Chinese		
Adriana Hölszky	1953		Romanian-German		
Juhani Komulainen	1953		Finnish		
Z. Randall Stroope	1953		American		
Boris Pigovat	1953		Israeli		
Akira Nishimura	1953	2023	Japanese		
Jeff Manookian	1953	2021	American		
Cindy McTee	1953		American		
Joel Hoffman	1953		Canadian		
Christos Hatzis	1953		Greek Canadian		
Richard Harvey	1953		British		
Stephen Whittington	1953		Australian		
Peter Hannan	1953		Canadian		
Ivan Fedele	1953		Italian		
Eibhlis Farrell	1953		Irish		
Sonja Beets	1953		Dutch		
Martin Amlin	1953		American		
John Craton	1953		American		
Anthony Powers	1953		British		
Stéphane Delplace	1953		French		
René Eespere	1953		Estonian		
John Luther Adams	1953		American	Become Ocean	
Patrick Ascione	1953	2014	French		
Daniel Asia	1953		American		
Cornelis de Bondt	1953		Dutch		
Hans-Jürgen von Bose	1953		German		
John Oswald	1953		Canadian		
Andrew Culver	1953		American		
Raymond Deane	1953		Irish		
Violeta Dinescu	1953		Romanian		
Patrick Doyle	1953		Scottish		
Arnold Dreyblatt	1953		American		
Denis Dufour	1953		French	Dernier quatuor, PH 27–80, Blue Rocket on a Rocky Shore, Cycle Le Livre des désordres	Instrumental perceptive morphology, acousmatic music, mixed music, electronic music
Robert Fleisher	1953		American		
Bernard Foccroulle	1953		Belgian		
Georg Friedrich Haas	1953		Austrian		
Paul Hertel	1953		Austrian		
Scott Irvine	1953		Canadian		
Anne LeBaron	1953		American		
Peter Scott Lewis	1953		American		
Zhou Long	1953		Chinese-American		
Peter McGarr	1953		British		
Tod Machover	1953		American		
Johan de Meij	1953		Dutch	Symphony No. 1 "The Lord of the Rings"	
László Melis	1953	2018	Hungarian		
Wim Mertens	1953		Belgian		
Christopher Norton	1953		British		
Åke Parmerud	1953		Swedish		
Alexander Raskatov	1953		Russian		
Robert Saxton	1953		British		
Wolfgang von Schweinitz	1953		German		
Roberto Sierra	1953		American		Born in Vega Baja, Puerto Rico
Roger Steptoe	1953		British		
James Wood	1953		British		
Chen Yi	1953		Chinese		
Takashi Yoshimatsu	1953		Japanese		
Jaime Mirtenbaum Zenamon	1953		Bolivian		
Lidia Zielińska	1953		Polish		
John Zorn	1953		American		
Jan Randall	1952		Canadian	Midsummer Night's Ice Dream; Pieces of Eight; Sonata for Piano	
Pär Lindgren	1952		Swedish		
Joseph Waters	1952		American		
Sérgio Assad	1952		Brazilian		
Brenton Broadstock	1952		Australian		
Alexander Voltz	1999		Australian		
Tina Davidson	1952		American		
Reinhard Febel	1952		German		
Max Beckschäfer	1952		German		
Ryuichi Sakamoto	1952	2023	Japanese		
Kazuhiro Morita	1952	2021	Japanese		
Dominic Muldowney	1952		English		
Lev Konov	1952		Russian		
Gerd Kühr	1952		German		
Christian Lauba	1952		Tunisian born French		
Miklós Sugár	1952		Hungarian		
Reza Vali	1952		Iranian		
José Luis Turina	1952		Spanish		
Mikhail Kollontay	1952		Russian		
Margriet Hoenderdos	1952	2010	Dutch		
Hans Gefors	1952		Swedish		
Philippe Fénelon	1952		French		
Maia Ciobanu	1952		Romanian		
Mark Carlson	1952		American		
David Carlson	1952		American		
Roger Bourland	1952		American		
Lee Hyla	1952	2014	American		
Dimitrije Bužarovski	1952		Macedonian		
Lee Bracegirdle	1952		American		
Motoyuki Shitanda	1952		Japanese		
José Carlos Amaral Vieira	1952		Brazilian		
Ushio Torikai	1952		Japanese		
S. P. Somtow	1952		Thai-American	Mae Naak (opera), Ayodhya (opera), The Silent Prince (opera), Dan no Ura (opera)	
Gordon Stout	1952		American		
Byambasuren Sharav	1952	2019	Mongolian		
Hans Abrahamsen	1952		Danish		
Kristi Allik	1952		Canadian		
Simon Bainbridge	1952	2021	British		
Gerald Barry	1952		Irish		
Judith Bingham	1952		British		
Roger Briggs	1952		American		
Todd Tamanend Clark	1952		American	Obsidian Variations, The Nature of Tongues	electronic, psychedelic
Joseph Dillon Ford	1952	2017	American		
Peter Garland	1952		American		
Heiner Goebbels	1952		German		
Jonty Harrison	1952		British		
Stephen Hartke	1952		American		
Oliver Knussen	1952	2018	British		
Zoltán Kocsis	1952	2016	Hungarian		
Philippe Manoury	1952		French		
Bunita Marcus	1952		American		
Sergei Pavlenko	1952		Russian-British		
Alla Pavlova	1952		Ukrainian-American		
Qu Xiao-Song	1952		Chinese		
Wolfgang Rihm	1952	2024	German	Dionysos	
Kaija Saariaho	1952	2023	Finnish	Laterna Magica	Female composer
Gustavo Santaolalla	1952		Argentine		
Somtow Sucharitkul	1952		Thai-American		
Param Vir	1952		Indian-British		
Peter-Jan Wagemans	1952		Dutch		
Moshe Zorman	1952		Israeli		
John Buckley	1951		Irish		
Pär Lund	1951		Swedish		
Richard Marriott	1951		American		
John D. Stevens	1951		American		
Gerald Levinson	1951		American		
Michael Jeffrey Shapiro	1951		American		
Frank La Rocca	1951		American		
Curt Cacioppo	1951		American		
Marcela Rodríguez	1951		Mexican		Female composer
Beth Wiseman	1951	2007	British		Female composer
Kenneth Kafui	1951	2020	Ghanaian		
Michael Blake	1951		South African		
John Burke	1951	2020	Canadian		
Nancy Galbraith	1951		American		
Craig H. Russell	1951		American		
Tatyana Sergeyeva	1951		Russian		
Mona Lyn Reese	1951		American		
Richard Emsley	1951		British		
James Erber	1951		British		
Viera Janárceková	1941	2023	Slovak		
Earl Howard	1951		American		
Patricia Jünger	1951		Swiss-Austrian		
Aivars Kalējs	1951		Latvian		
James Chater	1951		British		
George Tsontakis	1951		American		
Halina Harelava	1951		Belarusian		
Eero Hämeenniemi	1951		Finnish		
Denis Gougeon	1951		Canadian		
Gareth Glyn	1951		Welsh		
Jeannie G. Pool	1951		American		
António Pinho Vargas	1951		Portuguese		
Alan Belkin	1951		Canadian		
Nils-Göran Areskoug	1951	2025	Swedish		
Aleksandër Peçi	1951		Albanian		
George C. Baker	1951		American		
Manfred Stahnke	1951		German		
Doina Rotaru	1951		Romanian		
Louis Karchin	1951		American		
Karólína Eiríksdóttir	1951		Icelandic		
Justinian Tamusuza	1951		Ugandan		
Anneli Arho	1951		Finnish		
Rafał Augustyn	1951		Polish		
Hendrik Bouman	1951		Dutch		
Howard J. Buss	1951		American		
Qigang Chen	1951		Chinese-French		
Anthony Davis	1951		American		
David Earl	1951		South African		
Huib Emmer	1951		Dutch		
Lorenzo Ferrero	1951		Italian	La Conquista, Risorgimento!, Franca Florio, regina di Palermo	postmodern
Beatriz Bilbao	1951		Venezuelan		
Guus Janssen	1951		Dutch		
Patrick Larley	1951		British		
Michael Rosenzweig	1951		South African		
Philip Sparke	1951		British		
Lois V Vierk	1951		American		
Alejandro Viñao	1951		Argentine		
Otomar Kvěch	1950	2018	Czech	String Quartet No. 7	
Michalis Travlos	1950		Greek		
Michael Matthews	1950		Canadian		
John Borstlap	1950		Dutch		
Édith Canat de Chizy	1950		French		
Gene Bowen	1950		American		
Åse Hedstrøm	1950		Norwegian		
Emmanuel Gyimah Labi	1950		Ghanaian		
Lam Manyee	1950		Chinese		
Libby Larsen	1950		American		
Jay Reise	1950		American		
Simon Rowland-Jones	1950		English		
Joseph Pehrson	1950	2020	American		
Vivienne Olive	1950		British-Australian		
Laurent Petitgirard	1950		French		
Lewis Nielson	1950		American		
Carlos Micháns	1950		Dutch		
Lars Hegaard	1950		Danish		
Ulrich Gasser	1950		Swiss		
Zoran Erić	1950	2024	Serbian		
Richard Arnest	1950		American		
Carl Verbraeken	1950		Belgian		
Denis Bédard	1950		Canadian		
Dnu Huntrakul	1950		Thai		
Svetozar Sasa Kovacevic	1950	2022	Serbian		
Lejla Agolli	1950		American		
Ernani Aguiar	1950		Brazilian		
Beth Anderson	1950		American		
Christian Calon	1950		French Canadian		
Michael Carnes	1950		American		
Stephen Chatman	1950		Canadian		
Robert Dick	1950		American		
James Dillon	1950		Scottish		
Elena Firsova	1950		Russian		
Alistair Hinton	1950		Scottish		
Joe Hisaishi	1950		Japanese		
Christopher Hobbs	1950		British		
John Anthony Lennon	1950		American		
Arturo Márquez	1950		Mexican		
Synne Skouen	1950		Norwegian		
Michael Schelle	1950		American		
William Sweeney	1950		Scottish		
Nancy Telfer	1950		Canadian		
Christopher Yavelow	1950		American		
Daniele Zanettovich	1950		Italian		
Hiro Fujikake	1949		Japanese	Pastoral Fantasy (1975), The Rope Crest (1977), Symphony Japan(1993), Symphony IZUMO(2005)	
Odaline de la Martinez	1949		American		Female composer
John Thow	1949	2007	American		
Hanne Rømer	1949		Danish		Female composer
Zhanna Vasil'yevna Pliyeva	1949	2023	Russian		Female composer
Philip Kruse	1949		Norwegian		
Marina Marta Vlad	1949		Romanian		
Daniel Steven Crafts	1949		American		
Rocco Di Pietro	1949		Italian		
Rachel Galinne	1949		Israeli		
Geoffrey Poole	1949		American		
Carol E. Barnett	1949		American		
Tim Hodgkinson	1949		English		
Ian Dorricott	1949		Australian		
Michaël Lévinas	1949		French		
Vladimir Tošić	1949		Serbian		
Kimi Sato	1949		Japanese		
Lasse Thoresen	1949		Norwegian		
Jolyon Brettingham Smith	1949	2008	English		
Dean Drummond	1949	2013	American		
Carlos Azevedo	1949	2012	Portuguese		
János Vajda	1949		Hungarian		
Thomas Schmidt-Kowalski	1949	2013	German		
Judith Shatin	1949		American		
Gerhard Stäbler	1949		German		
Dave Smith	1949		British		
Richard Mills	1949		Australian		
Cezary Skubiszewski	1949		Polish Australian		
Manuel De Sica	1949	2014	Italian		
Ann Callaway	1949		American		
Leonid Bobylev	1949	2025	Russian		
Alexander Kandov	1949		Bulgarian		
Klaus Bruengel	1949		German		
Michel Herr	1949		Belgian		
Kalevi Aho	1949		Finnish		
Eleanor Alberga	1949		Jamaican		
James Barnes	1949		American		
Dennis Báthory-Kitsz	1949		American		
Javier Busto	1949		Spanish		
John Casken	1949		British		
Daniel Catán	1949	2011	Mexican		
Chan Ka Nin	1949		Canadian		
Geoffrey King	1949		British		
Mary Jane Leach	1949		American		
David Liptak	1949		American		
Dan Locklair	1949		American		
Alexina Louie	1949		Canadian		
Stephen Paulus	1949	2014	American		
Shulamit Ran	1949		Israeli-American		
Christopher Rouse	1949	2019	American		
Sharon Ruchman	1949		American		
Poul Ruders	1949		Danish		
Sinyan Shen	1949	2016	American		
Steven Stucky	1949	2016	American		
Manfred Trojahn	1949		German		
Fabio Vacchi	1949		Italian		
Kevin Volans	1949		Irish-South African		
Philip Wilby	1949		British		
Walter Zimmermann	1949		German		
Fu Tong Wong	1948		Chinese-American		
Susan Cohn Lackman	1948		American		Female composer
Bern Herbolsheimer	1948	2016	American		
Mark Abel	1948		American		
Igor Wakhévitch	1948		French		
Allen Shawn	1948		American		
Gisèle Barreau	1948		French		
Shoshana Riseman	1948		Israeli		
Lyudmila Karpawna Shleh	1948		Belarusian		
Junko Mori	1948		Japanese		
Sally Johnston Reid	1948	2019	American		
Brian Eno	1948		English		
Richard Festinger	1948		American		
Jean-Michel Jarre	1948		French		
Kerstin Jeppsson	1948		Swedish		
Theo Jörgensmann	1948	2025	German		
Natsagiin Jantsannorov	1948		Mongolian		
Janet Graham	1948		English		
Jim Hiscott	1948		Canadian		
Stuart Saunders Smith	1948	2024	American		
Marjan Mozetich	1948		Canadian		
Ron Nagorcka	1948		Australian		
Max Lifchitz	1948		Mexican		
Philippe Hersant	1948		French		
Jani Golob	1948		Slovenian		
Theo Brandmüller	1948	2012	German		
Chester Biscardi	1948		American		
Lubomyr Melnyk	1948		Canadian		
Paul DeMarinis	1948		American		
Ioseb Bardanashvili	1948		Georgian		
Claudio Ambrosini	1948		Italian		
Claude Baker	1948		American		
Michael Berkeley	1948		British		
Glenn Branca	1948	2018	American		
Stephen Brown	1948		Canadian		
Diana Burrell	1948		British		
Brian Elias	1948		British-Indian		
Steven Gerber	1948	2015	American		
Mikko Heiniö	1948		Finnish		
Bo Holten	1948		Danish		
Leslie Howard	1948		Australian		
Edward McGuire	1948		Scottish		
Winfried Michel	1948		German		
Nigel Osborne	1948		British		
Ivana Stefanovic	1948		Serbian		
Peter Ruzicka	1948		German		
Haskell Small	1948	2024	American		
Dmitri Smirnov	1948	2020	Russian-British		
Bernadette Speach	1948		American		
Jukka Tiensuu	1948		Finnish		
Julia Tsenova	1948	2010	Bulgarian		
Dan Welcher	1948		American		
Grażyna Pstrokońska-Nawratil	1947		Polish		Female composer
Salvatore Macchia	1947		American		
Anders Koppel	1947		Danish		
Efim Jourist	1947	2007	Ukrainian		
Faye-Ellen Silverman	1947		American		Female composer
Alan Bullard	1947		English		
Zarrina Mirshakar	1947		Tajik		
Václav Riedlbauch	1947	2017	Czech		
Gwyneth Van Anden Walker	1947		American		
Jack Gallagher	1947		American		
Donald Grantham	1947		American		
Ruth Bakke	1947		Norwegian		
Grigoriy Korchmar	1947	2025	Russian		
Vlastimir Trajković	1947	2017	Serbian		
Gwyneth Walker	1947		American		
Paul Schoenfield	1947	2024	American		
Hilary Tann	1947	2023	Welsh		
Hugh Shrapnel	1947		English		
Max Stern	1947		Israeli		
David Porcelijn	1947		Dutch		
David Ott	1947		American		
György Orbán	1947		Hungarian		
Paul Patterson	1947		British		
Giorgio Pacchioni	1947		Italian		
George Palmer	1947		Australian		
Philip Martin	1947		Irish		
Vasily Lobanov	1947		Russian		
Peter Paul Koprowski	1947		Canadian		
Kjell Mørk Karlsen	1947		Norwegian		
Max E. Keller	1947		Swiss		
Ivan Jevtić	1947		Serbian/French		
Barry Guy	1947		British		
David Gillingham	1947		American		
Ada Gentile	1947		Italian		
Steven Gellman	1947		Canadian		
Jean-Yves Bosseur	1947		French		
Liana Alexandra	1947	2011	Romanian		
Anthony Plog	1947		American		
Georgs Pelēcis	1947		Latvian		
Krzysztof Knittel	1947		Polish		
Jean-Louis Florentz	1947	2004	French	L'Enfant des Iles (op.16, 2002)	
Renaud Gagneux	1947	2018	French		
Kim Kuusi	1947		Finnish		
Somei Satoh	1947		Japanese		
Mayako Kubo	1947		Japanese		
John Adams	1947		American	On the Transmigration of Souls	
Franghiz Ali-Zadeh	1947		Azerbaijani		
Michel Chion	1947		French		
Anders Eliasson	1947	2013	Swedish		
Ko Fan-long	1947		Taiwanese		
Don Freund	1947		American		
Peter Michael Hamel	1947		German		
John S. Hilliard	1947	2019	American		
Jo Kondo	1947		Japanese		
Joan La Barbara	1947		American		
Nicola LeFanu	1947		British		
Tristan Murail	1947		French		
Morris Pert	1947	2010	Scottish		
Pēteris Plakidis	1947	2017	Latvian		
Karl Aage Rasmussen	1947		Danish		
David Rosenboom	1947		American		
Salvatore Sciarrino	1947		Italian		
Howard Skempton	1947		British		
James Swearingen	1947		American		
Emil Tabakov	1947		Bulgarian		
Barry Truax	1947		Canadian		
Roger Craig Vogel	1947		American		
Chris Willcock	1947		Australian		
Joel Eric Suben	1946	2023	American		
Wolfgang Rübsam	1946		German-American		
Harald Sæther	1946		Norwegian		
Sheila Silver	1946		American		Female composer
Claire Schapira	1946		French		Female composer
Joelle Wallach	1946		American		
Dana Wilson	1946		American		
Snaffu Rigor	1946	2016	Filipino		
Heinz Winbeck	1946	2019	German		
Ho Wai-On	1946		British		
Nicola Piovani	1946		Italian		
Robert Xavier Rodriguez	1946		American		
Richard St. Clair	1946		American		
Gilius van Bergeijk	1946		Dutch		
Renate Birnstein	1946		German		
Zsolt Gárdonyi	1946		Hungarian German		
Niels Bernhart	1946	2008	Danish		
Ann-Elise Hannikainen	1946	2012	Finnish		
Konstantin Petrossian	1946		Armenian		
Anna Rubin	1946		American		
Jane O'Leary	1946		American		
Henry Mollicone	1946	2022	American		
David Noon	1946		American		
Max Méreaux	1946		French		
Peter Lieberson	1946	2011	American		
Ladislav Kubík	1946	2017	Czech-American		
Michael Kugel	1946		Russian		
John Metcalf	1946		British and Canadian		
Gabriel Iranyi	1946		Romanian-born Israeli-German		
Barbara Harbach	1946		American		
Jean-Luc Darbellay	1946		Swiss		
Tsippi Fleischer	1946		Israeli		
Mónica Cosachov	1946		Argentine		
Dora Draganova	1946		Bulgarian		
Marilyn Shrude	1946		American		
Marcel Wengler	1946		Luxembourg		
Ali Darmar	1946		Turkish		
Klaus Ager	1946		Austrian		
Barbara Benary	1946	2019	American		
Michel Longtin	1946		Canadian		
Anne Boyd	1946		Australian		
Martin Bresnick	1946		American		
Pierre Even	1946		Luxembourgish		
Michael Finnissy	1946		British		
Janice Giteck	1946		American		
Annette Vande Gorne	1946		Belgian		
David Evan Jones	1946		American		
Pınar Köksal	1946	2019	Turkish		
Ulrich Leyendecker	1946	2018	German		
Vladimir Martynov	1946		Russian		
Colin Matthews	1946		British		
Dimitri Nicolau	1946	2008	Italian		
Bruce Saylor	1946		American		
Tolib Shakhidi	1946		Tajik		
Howard Shore	1946		Canadian		
Denis Smalley	1946		New Zealander		
Giles Swayne	1946		British		
Olav Anton Thommessen	1946		Norwegian		
Pēteris Vasks	1946		Latvian		
Diderik Wagenaar	1946		Dutch		
Hildegard Westerkamp	1946		German-Canadian		
Graciela Agudelo	1945	2018	Mexican		
Linda Spevacek	1945		American		Female composer
Julia Usher	1945		English		Female composer
Trond Kverno	1945		Norwegian		
Zhao Jiping	1945		Chinese		
Felipe Sosa	1945		Paraguayan		
Milan Mihajlović	1945		Serbian		
Dorothy Quita Buchanan	1945		New Zealander		
Ig Henneman	1945		Dutch		
Vânia Dantas Leite	1945	2018	Brazilian		
Ole Buck	1945		Danish		
Younghi Pagh-Paan	1945		South Korean		
Ian Cugley	1945	2010	Australian		
Fredric Kroll	1945		American		
Shirish Korde	1945		American		
Chan-hae Lee	1945		South Korean		
Doug Riley	1945	2007	Canadian		
Russell Peck	1945	2009	American		
İstemihan Taviloğlu	1945	2006	Turkish		
David Schiff	1945		American		
Elizabeth Raum	1945		Canadian		
Arnold Rosner	1945	2013	American		
Ragnar Søderlind	1945		Norwegian		
Luca Lombardi	1945		Italian		
Jacques Lenot	1945		French		
Peter Kiesewetter	1945	2012	German		
Ivan Karabyts	1945	2002	Ukrainian		
Graciane Finzi	1945		French		
Melanie Ruth Daiken	1945	2016	English		
Victoria Bond	1945		American		
Ruben Sargsyan	1945	2013	Armenian		
Maya Badian	1945		Romanian-born Canadian		
Judith Clingan	1945		Australian		
Thomas Wells	1945		American		
Thomas Pasatieri	1945		American		
Nagako Konishi	1945		Japanese		
Ahmed Achour	1945	2021	Tunisian		
Charles Amirkhanian	1945		American		
Georges Aperghis	1945		Greek		
Atar Arad	1945		Israeli-American		
Clarence Barlow	1945	2023	British		
Boudewijn Buckinx	1945		Belgian		
Rauf Dhomi	1945		Kosovar		
Edward Gregson	1945		British		
Thomas Oboe Lee	1945		Chinese-American		
Alexandre Rabinovitch-Barakovsky	1945		Russian-Swiss		
John Rutter	1945		British		
Alexey Rybnikov	1945		Russian		
Avi Schönfeld	1947		Dutch-Israeli		
Martin Wesley-Smith	1945	2019	Australian		
Judith Lang Zaimont	1945		American		
Alexander Zhurbin	1945		Russian		
Robert Manno	1944		American		
Michael Tilson Thomas	1944	2026	American		
Anna Bofill	1944		Spanish		Female composer
Christopher Gunning	1944	2023	British		
Beatriz Lockhart	1944	2015	Uruguayan		
Arif Mirzayev	1944		Azerbaijani		
Neely Bruce	1944		American		
Claire Renard	1944		French		
Tatyana Chudova	1944	2021	Russian		
Silvia Sommer	1944		Austrian		
Lyell Cresswell	1944	2022	New Zealander		
Alison Bauld	1944		Australian		
Marisa Rezende	1944		Brazilian		
Stephen Scott	1944	2021	American		
Russell Schulz-Widmar	1944		American		
Goff Richards	1944	2011	English		
John Hawkins	1944	2007	Canadian		
Thomas Koppel	1944	2006	Danish		
Rhian Samuel	1944		Welsh		
Pekka Kostiainen	1944		Finnish		
John Fodi	1944	2009	Canadian		
Barry Conyngham	1944		Australian		
Lee Holdridge	1944		Haitian-born American		
Paul Drayton	1944		British		
Michael Garrett	1944	2023	English		
Gabriella Cecchi	1944		Italian		
Thüring Bräm	1944		Swiss		
Gilbert Biberian	1944	2023	British		
Willem Breuker	1944	2010	Dutch		
Frank Corcoran	1944		Irish		
Iancu Dumitrescu	1944		Romanian		
Péter Eötvös	1944	2024	Hungarian		
York Höller	1944		German		
Karl Jenkins	1944		Welsh		
Giedrius Kuprevičius	1944		Lithuanian		
Paul Lansky	1944		American		
Pehr Henrik Nordgren	1944	2008	Finnish		
Michael Nyman	1944		British		
Johnterryl Plumeri	1944	2016	American		
John Rea	1944		Canadian		
Leif Segerstam	1944	2024	Finnish		
Penelope Thwaites	1944		Australian		
John Tavener	1944	2013	British		
László Vidovszky	1944		Hungarian		
Klaas de Vries	1944		Dutch		
Tison Street	1943		American		
Alejandro Núñez Allauca	1943		Peruvian		
Bruce MacCombie	1943	2012	American		
Laura Clayton	1943		American		
Solange Ancona	1943	2019	French		
Faraj Garayev	1943		Azerbaijani		
Marta Ptaszynska	1943		Polish		
Michèle Reverdy	1943		French		
Michael Radulescu	1943	2023	Romanian-German		
Robert Morris	1943		American		
Stephen Montague	1943		American		
David Reeves	1943		Australian		
Costin Miereanu	1943	2025	French		
Krzysztof Meyer	1943		Polish		
David Maslanka	1943	2017	American		
Miklós Maros	1943		Hungarian		
Fred Lerdahl	1943		American		
Tania León	1943		Cuban		
Anne Lauber	1943		Canadian		
Anthony Iannaccone	1943		American		
Gabriel Fernández Álvez	1943	2008	Spanish		
Eleanor Cory	1943		American		
Frank Denyer	1943		English		
Jon Deak	1943		American		
José Antônio Rezende de Almeida Prado	1943	2010	Brazilian		
Artin Poturlyan	1943	2022	Armenian-Bulgarian		
James Curnow	1943		American		
Maryanne Amacher	1943	2009	American		
Larry Lake	1943	2013	Canadian		
Daniel Börtz	1943		Swedish		
Joanna Bruzdowicz	1943	2021	Polish		
Gavin Bryars	1943		British		
Edward Cowie	1943		British		
Hugh Davies	1943	2005	British		
William Duckworth	1943	2012	American		
Hugues Dufourt	1943		French		
Dennis Eberhard	1943	2005	American		
Ross Edwards	1943		Australian		
Margriet Ehlen	1943		Dutch		
Julio Estrada	1943		Mexican		
Brian Ferneyhough	1943		British		
Joseph Fitzmartin	1943		American		
Allain Gaussin	1943		French		
Rolf Gehlhaar	1943	2019	American		
HK Gruber	1943		Austrian		
Robin Holloway	1943		English	Concertos Nos. 4 and 5 for Orchestra	
Shin-ichiro Ikebe	1943		Japanese		
Ilaiyaraaja	1943		Indian		
Zoltán Jeney	1943	2019	Hungarian		
Alexander Knaifel	1943	2024	Russian		
Morten Lauridsen	1943		American		
Mario Lavista	1943	2021	Mexican		
Bill McGlaughlin	1943		American		
David Matthews	1943		British		
Vangelis Papathanasiou	1943	2022	Greek		
Imant Raminsh	1943		Latvian-Canadian		
Joseph Schwantner	1943		American		
Roger Smalley	1943	2015	British-Australian		
Yoav Talmi	1943		Israeli		
Michael Vetter	1943	2013	German		
Alexander Vustin	1943	2020	Russian		
Udo Zimmermann	1943	2021	German		
Ilayaraja	1943		Indian		
Canary Burton	1942		American		Female composer
Jon Mostad	1942		Norwegian		
Jeffrey Lewis	1942	2025	Welsh		
John Cale	1942		Welsh		
Diane Thome	1942	2025	American		
Jonathan Kramer	1942	2004	American		
Kyungsun Suh	1942		Korean		
Diogenes Rivas	1942		Venezuelan		
Wojciech Rybicki	1942	2019	Polish		
Daniel Roth	1942		French		
Shigeaki Saegusa	1942		Japanese		
John McGuire	1942		American		
Haruna Miyake	1942		Japanese		
Birgitte Alsted	1942		Danish		
Adel Kamel	1942	2003	Egyptian		
Gentil Montaña	1942	2011	Colombian		
Julian Dawes	1942		English		
Yevhen Stankovych	1942		Ukrainian		
Timothy Salter	1942		English		
Tomás Marco	1942		Spanish		
David Johnson	1942	2009	Scottish		
Ulf Grahn	1942	2023	Swedish		
David Fanshawe	1942	2010	English		
Robert Cuckson	1942		American		
Helen Fisher	1942		New Zealander		
Philip Bračanin	1942		Australian		
Viktor Suslin	1942	2012	Russian		
Jorge Antunes	1942		Brazilian		
Limoz Dizdari	1942		Albanian		
Clive Strutt	1942		English		
David Padrós	1942	2016	Spanish		
Guy Bovet	1942		Swiss		
Brian Cherney	1942		Canadian		
Volker David Kirchner	1942	2020	German	operas Gilgamesh; Savanarola; Gutenberg	
Ingram Marshall	1942	2022	American		
Paul McCartney	1942		British	Ecce Cor Meum, Ocean's Kingdom	
Meredith Monk	1942		American		
John Purser	1942		Scottish		
Horațiu Rădulescu	1942	2008	Romanian-French		
Sven-David Sandström	1942	2019	Swedish		
Chinary Ung	1942		Cambodian		
John Maxwell Geddes	1941	2017	Scottish	An Ayrshire Suite	
C. Curtis-Smith	1941	2014	American		
Terry Winter Owens	1941	2007	American		Female composer
Elizabeth Walton Vercoe	1941		American		Female composer
Antony le Fleming	1941		English		
Philip Krumm	1941		American		
Paul Alan Levi	1941		American		
Judith Margaret Bailey	1941	2025	English		
Anđelka Bego-Šimunić	1941	2022	Bosnian		
Richard Nanes	1941	2009	American		
Sook-Ja Oh	1941		Korean		
Magaly Ruiz	1941		Cuban		
Sorrel Hays	1941	2020	American		
James Di Pasquale	1941		American		
Kay Gardner	1941	2002	American		
Richard Edward Wilson	1941		American		
Frank Proto	1941		American		
Erkki Salmenhaara	1941	2002	Finnish		
John Melby	1941		American		
Ivana Loudová	1941	2017	Czech		
Édith Lejet	1941	2024	French		
Valeri Kikta	1941		Ukrainian		
Moya Henderson	1941		Australian		
Teppo Hauta-aho	1941	2021	Finnish		
Adolphus Hailstork	1941		American		
Sebastian Forbes	1941		English		
Sergio Calligaris	1941	2023	Argentine		
Derek Bourgeois	1941	2017	English		
Graham Newcater	1941	2025	South African		
Stojan Stojkov	1941		Macedonian		
Hafliði Hallgrímsson	1941		Icelandic		
Konrad Boehmer	1941	2014	Dutch-German		
Geoffrey Burgon	1941	2010	British		
Johannes Fritsch	1941	2010	German		
Angelo Gilardino	1941	2022	Italian		
Friedrich Goldmann	1941	2009	German		
Jackson Hill	1941		American		
Imants Kalniņš	1941		Latvian		
Emmanuel Nunes	1941	2012	Portuguese	Das Märchen (opera)	
Vladislav Shoot	1941	2022	Russian-British		
Wadada Leo Smith	1941		American		
Nguyen-Thien Dao	1940	2015	Vietnamese-French		
Joseph Fennimore	1940		American		
Manuel Lillo Torregrosa	1940	2024	Spanish		
Heidi Baader-Nobs	1940		Swiss		Female composer
Alexander Yossifov	1940	2016	Bulgarian		
David Pentecost	1940		British		
Graciela Paraskevaidis	1940	2017	Argentine		
Maria Teresa Luengo	1940		Argentine		
Ken-Ichiro Kobayashi	1940		Japanese		
Gary Lee Nelson	1940		American		
Dorothy Rudd Moore	1940	2022	American		
Octavian Nemescu	1940	2020	Romanian		
Margaret Brouwer	1940		American		
Helmut Bieler	1940	2019	German		
Dieter Acker	1940	2006	German		
António Victorino de Almeida	1940		Portuguese		
Vyacheslav Artyomov	1940		Russian		
Juraj Beneš	1940	2004	Slovak		
Vladimir Cosma	1940		French-Romanian		
Graciela Castillo	1940		Argentine		
Henry Flynt	1940		American		
Jon Gibson	1940	2020	American		
Eleanor Hovda	1940	2009	American		
Alden Jenks	1940		American		
David C. Johnson	1940	2021	American		
Maciej Małecki	1940		Polish		
Dary John Mizelle	1940		American		
Peer Raben	1940	2007	German		
László Sáry	1940		Hungarian		
Alvin Singleton	1940		American		
Dan-Alexandru Voiculescu	1940	2009	Romanian		
Andrew Thomas	1939	2026	American		
Robert E. Jager	1939		American		
Ivan Bootham	1939	2016	New Zealander		
Bent Hesselmann	1939	2024	Danish		
Ma Shui-long	1939	2015	Taiwanese		
Inger Wikström	1939		Swedish		
María Luisa Ozaita	1939	2017	Spanish		
Lesia Dychko	1939		Ukrainian		
Jon Appleton	1939	2022	American		
Elinor Armer	1939		American		
Charles Boone	1939		American		
Alojz Ajdič	1939		Slovenian		
Mikheil Kobakhidze	1939	2019	Georgian		
Jean-Claude Amiot	1939		French		
Jennifer Fowler	1939		British		
Margaret Lucy Wilkins	1939		English		
Ricardo Tacuchian	1939		Brazilian		
Michael Smither	1939		New Zealander		
John Rimmer	1939		New Zealander		
Marlos Nobre	1939	2024	Brazilian		
Tigran Mansurian	1939		Armenian		
Bruce Mather	1939		Canadian		
David Loeb	1939		American		
Jaroslav Krček	1939		Czech		
Manuel de Elías	1939		Mexican		
Maija Einfelde	1939		Latvian		
Edwin Penhorwood	1939		American		
Gian Paolo Chiti	1939		Italian		
Georgi Minchev	1939		Bulgarian		
José Antonio Abreu	1939	2018	Venezuelan		
Robert Aitken	1939		Canadian		
Louis Andriessen	1939	2021	Dutch	La Commedia; La Giro; Anais Nin; Mysterien; Agamemnon; Theater of the World.	
Marcelle Deschênes	1939		Canadian		
Leo Brouwer	1939		Cuban		
Wendy Carlos	1939		American		
Victor Davies	1939		Canadian		
Hartmut Geerken	1939	2021	German		
Jonathan Harvey	1939	2012	British		
Heinz Holliger	1939		Swiss		
Nicolaus A. Huber	1939		German		
Franz Hummel	1939	2022	German		
Tom Johnson	1939	2024	American		
Barbara Kolb	1939	2024	American		
Jean-Pierre Leguay	1939		French		
Annea Lockwood	1939		American		
Arkady Luxemburg	1939		Moldovan-American		
John McCabe	1939	2015	British		
Daan Manneke	1939		Dutch		
Vyacheslav Nagovitsin	1939	2023	Buryat		
Naresh Sohal	1939	2018	Indian-British		
David Stock	1939	2015	American		
Tomáš Svoboda	1939	2022	Czech-American		
Zsigmond Szathmáry	1939		Hungarian		
Richard Teitelbaum	1939	2020	American		
Boris Tishchenko	1939	2010	Russian		
James Willey	1939		American		
Ellen Taaffe Zwilich	1939		American		
Roland C. Jordan	1938		American		
Hans-Joachim Hespos	1938	2022	German		
Ann Carr-Boyd	1938		Australian		
Michel Rateau	1938	2020	French		
Barton McLean	1938		American		
Mieko Shiomi	1938		Japanese		
Douglas Leedy	1938	2015	American		
Reinbert de Leeuw	1938	2020	Dutch		
David Borden	1938		American		
Piera Pistono	1938		Italian		
Tyzen Hsiao	1938	2015	Taiwanese		
Givi Gachechiladze	1938		Georgian		
Simon Preston	1938	2022	English		
Graham Jenkin	1938		Australian		
Álvaro Cassuto	1938	2026	Portuguese		
José Serebrier	1938		Uruguayan		
Tona Scherchen	1938		Swiss		
Emanuel Vahl	1938		Ukrainian-Israeli		
Harvey Sollberger	1938		American		
Cornelia Tăutu	1938	2019	Romanian		
William Thomas McKinley	1938	2015	American		
Michael Parsons	1938		British		
Piotr Lachert	1938	2018	Polish		
Peter Aston	1938	2013	English		
Alain Gagnon	1938	2017	Canadian		
Paul Chihara	1938		American		
Howard Blake	1938		English		
Elliot del Borgo	1938	2013	American		
Elizabeth R. Austin	1938		American		
Zoran Hristić	1938	2019	Serbian		
Dianne Goolkasian Rahbee	1938		American		
Atli Heimir Sveinsson	1938	2019	Icelandic		
Virko Baley	1938		Ukrainian-American		
Bart Berman	1938		Dutch-Israeli		
William Bolcom	1938		American		
Gloria Coates	1933	2023	American		
John Corigliano	1938		American		
Alvin Curran	1938		American		
Jean-Claude Éloy	1938	2025	French		
John Harbison	1938		American		
Paavo Heininen	1938	2022	Finnish		
Jacques Hétu	1938	2010	Canadian		
Zygmunt Krauze	1938		Polish		
Mesías Maiguashca	1938		Ecuadorian		
Jean-Christian Michel	1938		French		
Frederic Rzewski	1938	2021	American		
Richard Stoker	1938	2021	British		
Yuji Takahashi	1938		Japanese		
Dimitri Terzakis	1938		Greek		
Joan Tower	1938		American		
Jan Vriend	1938		Dutch		
Charles Wuorinen	1938	2020	American		
Rolf Riehm	1937	2026	German	Sirenen (opera)	
Dubravko Detoni	1937		Croatian		
Miguel Ángel Coria	1937	2016	Spanish		
Zbigniew Bargielski	1937		Polish		
David Cornwall	1937	2006	American		
Dmitry Smolsky	1937	2017	Belarusian		
Joop Stokkermans	1937	2012	Dutch		
Wang Xilin	1937		Chinese		
Guy Woolfenden	1937	2016	English		
Olly Wilson	1937	2018	American		
Misha Geller	1937	2007	Russian		
Marta Lambertini	1937	2019	Argentine		
Jon Hassell	1937	2021	American		
Anatoly Dokumentov	1937		Russian		
Robert Moran	1937		American		
Paul Ramsier	1937	2021	American		
Yoshihisa Taira	1937	2005	Japanese-born French		
Irma Ravinale	1937	2013	Italian		
Ann Southam	1937	2010	Canadian		
Edwin Roxburgh	1937		English		
Ahmad Pejman	1937	2025	Iranian		
Irina Odagescu	1937		Romanian		
Jean-Louis Petit	1937		French		
Paul Méfano	1937	2020	French		
Katherine Hoover	1937	2018	American		
Bernard Gilmore	1937	2013	American		
John Ferritto	1937	2010	American		
Azio Corghi	1937	2022	Italian		
Beatriz Ferreyra	1937		Argentine		
Janet Beat	1937		Scottish		
Michael Conway Baker	1937	2025	Canadian		
Jan Bach	1937	2020	American		
Tore Uppström	1937	2006	Swedish		
Keiko Abe	1937		Japanese		
Edward Applebaum	1937	2020	American		
Junsang Bahk	1937		South Korean		
Osvaldas Balakauskas	1937	2026	Lithuanian		
David Bedford	1937	2011	British		
David Behrman	1937		American		
Gordon Crosse	1937	2021	British		
David Del Tredici	1937	2023	American		
George Flynn	1937		American		
Philip Glass	1937		American	The Hours, Symphony 8	
Lóránt Hajdú	1937		Hungarian		
Walter Hekster	1937	2012	Dutch		
Nikolai Kapustin	1937	2020	Ukrainian		
Philip Ledger	1937	2012	British		
Bo Nilsson	1937	2018	Swedish		
Valentyn Sylvestrov	1937		Ukrainian		
Loris Tjeknavorian	1937		Iranian-Armenian		
Rick Wilkins	1937		Canadian		
Yehuda Yannay	1937	2023	Israeli-American		
Robert Leaf	1936	2005	American		
Joyce Grill	1936		American	Spanish Nights	Female composer
Vitaliy Hodziatsky	1936		Ukrainian		
Brunhilde Sonntag	1936	2002	German		
Oleksandr Krasotov	1936	2007	Ukrainian		
Harold Budd	1936	2020	American		
Colin Mawby	1936	2019	English		
Aleksandar Džambazov	1936	2022	Macedonian		
Erika Fox	1936		British		Female composer
Malcolm Goldstein	1936		American		
Trisutji Kamal	1936	2021	Indonesian		
Izabella Arazova	1936		Armenian		
Jocy de Oliveira	1936		Brazilian		
Sheila Nelson	1936	2020	English		
John White	1936	2024	English		
Vivian Adelberg Rudow	1936		American		
Elliott Schwartz	1936	2016	American		
Marek Stachowski	1936	2004	Polish		
Erika Radermacher	1936		German		
Gérard Masson	1936	2021	French		
Ami Maayani	1936	2019	Israeli		
Alexandru Hrisanide	1936	2018	Romanian		
Barbara Heller	1936		German		
Nigel Brooks	1936	2024	English		
Ralph Lundsten	1936	2023	Swedish		
Claude Coppens	1936		Belgian		
Monic Cecconi-Botella	1936	2025	French		
Fahri Beqiri	1936	2021	Albanian		
Herbert Blendinger	1936	2020	Austrian		
Sieglinde Ahrens	1936		German		
Gilbert Amy	1936		French		
Richard Rodney Bennett	1936	2012	British		
David Blake	1936		British		
Philippe Boesmans	1936	2022	Belgian		
Carl Davis	1936	2023	American-British		
Michel Decoust	1936		French		
Iván Erőd	1936	2019	Hungarian-Austrian		
Malcolm Forsyth	1936	2011	South African-Canadian		
Éric Gaudibert	1936	2012	Swiss		
Frans Geysen	1936		Belgian		
Daniel Goode	1936		American		
Maki Ishii	1936	2003	Japanese		
Akil Mark Koci	1936		Kosovar-Albanian		
Ladislav Kupkovič	1936	2016	Slovak		
Anthony Payne	1936	2021	British		
Steve Reich	1936		American		
Aribert Reimann	1936	2024	German	Medea	
Robert Suderburg	1936	2013	American		
David Ward-Steinman	1936	2015	American		
Hans Zender	1936	2019	German	Chief Joseph (opera)	
Sergei Cortez	1935	2016	Belarusian		
Wang Qiang	1935		Chinese		
Gloria Wilson Swisher	1935	2023	American		
Luis Advis	1935	2004	Chilean		
Khayyam Mirzazade	1935	2018	Azerbaijani		
Kazuko Hara	1935	2014	Japanese		
Helen Gifford	1935		Australian		
Biancamaria Furgeri	1935		Italian		
Vasif Adigozalov	1935	2006	Azerbaijani		
Jiří Teml	1935		Czech		
Noam Sheriff	1935	2018	Israeli		
Carlo Martelli	1935		English		
Enid Luff	1935	2022	Welsh		
André Isoir	1935	2016	French		
John Eaton	1935	2015	American		
Jordi Cervelló	1935	2022	Spanish		
Thérèse Brenet	1935		French		
Jiří Bárta	1935	2012	Czech		
Conrad Susa	1935	2013	American		
Rajko Maksimović	1935	2024	Serbian		
Ian Keith Harris	1935	2024	Australian		
Kurt Schwertsik	1935		Austrian		
Akin Euba	1935	2020	Nigerian		
Theodore Antoniou	1935	2018	Greek		
Nigel Butterley	1935	2022	Australian		
Derek Bell	1935	2002	Irish		
Bruno Canino	1935		Italian		
Leonid Hrabovsky	1935		Ukrainian		
Elgar Howarth	1935	2025	English		
Samuel Jones	1935		American		
Giya Kancheli	1935	2019	Georgian		
Georg Katzer	1935	2019	German		
Helmut Lachenmann	1935		German		
Bent Lorentzen	1935	2018	Danish		
François-Bernard Mâche	1935		French		
Pierre Mariétan	1935	2025	Swiss		
Diego Masson	1935		French		
Nicholas Maw	1935	2009	British		
Misha Mengelberg	1935	2017	Dutch		
Gordon Mumma	1935		American		
Arvo Pärt	1935		Estonian	Symphony No. 4	
Terry Riley	1935		American		
Aulis Sallinen	1935		Finnish		
Peter Schat	1935	2003	Dutch		
Peter Schickele	1935	2024	American		
Charles Shere	1935	2020	American		
Steve Tittle	1935	2024	Canadian		
La Monte Young	1935		American		
Mirjana Živković	1935	2020	Serbian		
Solhi al-Wadi	1934	2007	Iraqi-Syrian		
Benjamin Boretz	1934		American		
Geoffrey Grey	1934	2023	British		
Alicia Terzian	1934		Argentine		
Bernard Vitet	1934	2013	French		
Ramon Sender	1934		Spanish		
Zhanneta Metallidi	1934	2019	Russian		
Richard Wernick	1934	2025	American		
Teresa Procaccini	1934		Italian		
Claudio Prieto	1934	2015	Spanish		
Alexandra Pierce	1934	2021	American		
Walter Steffens	1934		German		
Jeremy Dale Roberts	1934	2017	English		
Jan Klusák	1934		Czech		
Bernard Hoffer	1934		Swiss-born American		
Rob du Bois	1934	2013	Dutch		
Norma Beecroft	1934	2024	Canadian		
İlhan Baran	1934	2016	Turkish		
Henrique de Curitiba	1934	2008	Brazilian		
Vassil Kazandjiev	1934		Bulgarian		
Mary Mageau	1934	2020	American		
Bernard Rands	1934	2026	American		
Alain Bancquart	1934	2022	French		
Harrison Birtwistle	1934	2022	British	The Corridor	
Mario Davidovsky	1934	2019	Argentine-American		
Peter Maxwell Davies	1934	2016	British	Naxos Quartets; Kommilitonen!; Symphony No. 8; Symphony No. 9	
Peter Dickinson	1934	2023	British		
Anthony Gilbert	1934	2023	British		
Paul Glass	1934		American		
Srul Irving Glick	1934	2002	Canadian		
Vinko Globokar	1934		French		
Bryan Kelly	1934	2026	English		
John McLeod	1934	2022	Scottish		
Siegfried Matthus	1934	2021	German		
Gonzalo de Olavide	1934	2005	Spanish		
Paul Panhuysen	1934	2015	Dutch		
Roger Reynolds	1934		American		
Larry Sitsky	1934		Australian		
Avo Sõmer	1934	2024	Estonian-American		
Ernstalbrecht Stiebler	1934	2024	German		
James Tenney	1934	2006	American		
Christian Wolff	1934		American		
Arlene Zallman	1934	2006	American		
Eric Salzman	1933	2017	American	The True Last Words of Dutch Schultz (opera)	
Joel Spiegelman	1933	2023	American		
Vincent McDermott	1933	2016	American	The Blue Forest	
George Tibbits	1933	2008	Australian		
John Sanders	1933	2003	English		
Roland Trogan	1933	2012	American		
Bertram Turetzky	1933		American		
Michael Brimer	1933	2023	Australian		
Maria Helena Rosas Fernandes	1933		Brazilian		
Seóirse Bodley	1933	2023	Irish		
Harrison Oxley	1933	2009	British		
W. Francis McBeth	1933	2012	American		
Andrei Volkonsky	1933	2008	Russian		
Albert Markov	1933		Russian American		
Miklós Kocsár	1933	2019	Hungarian		
Don Kay	1933		Australian		
Ida Gotkovsky	1933	2025	French		
Pozzi Escot	1933		American		
Walter Buczynski	1933		Canadian		
Colin Brumby	1933	2018	Australian		
Jerry Bilik	1933		American		
Helene Karastoyanova	1933		Bulgarian		
Toshi Ichiyanagi	1933	2022	Japanese		
Antón García Abril	1933	2021	Spanish		
Leonardo Balada	1933		Spanish-American		
Easley Blackwood Jr.	1933	2023	American		
Justin Connolly	1933	2020	British		
Henryk Górecki	1933	2010	Polish		
Jerry Herman	1933	2019	American		
Krzysztof Penderecki	1933	2020	Polish	List of compositions by Krzysztof Penderecki	
Ilkka Kuusisto	1933	2025	Finnish	operas	
István Láng	1933	2023	Hungarian		
Akira Miyoshi	1933	2013	Japanese		
Yves Prin	1933		French		
R. Murray Schafer	1933	2021	Canadian		
Morton Subotnick	1933		American		
Ton-That Tiet	1933		Vietnamese-French		
Wang Jianzhong	1933	2016	Chinese		
Marvin David Levy	1932	2015	American		
Robert Lombardo	1932	2026	American		
Diana McIntosh	1932	2022	Canadian		
Diana Pereira Hay	1932		Danish		
Elaine Barkin	1932	2023	American		
Hans G. Helms	1932	2012	German		
Kilza Setti	1932		Brazilian		
Max Schubel	1932	2010	American		
Coleridge-Taylor Perkinson	1932	2004	American		
Rudi Martinus van Dijk	1932	2003	Dutch		
Tod Dockstader	1932	2008	American		electronic music
Muammer Sun	1932	2021	Turkish		
Alan Stout	1932	2018	American		
Malcolm Peyton	1932	2025	American		
Jaan Rääts	1932	2020	Estonian		
Doru Popovici	1932	2019	Romanian		
Giacomo Manzoni	1932		Italian		
Karl Kroeger	1932		American		
Marta Jiráčková	1932		Czech		
Bengt Hallberg	1932	2013	Swedish		
Fyodor Druzhinin	1932	2007	Russian		
Michael Colgrass	1932	2019	American		
Carey Blyton	1932	2002	British		
Betty Beath	1932		Australian		
Jean-Michel Defaye	1932	2025	French		
Malcolm Lipkin	1932	2017	English		
François Bayle	1932		French		
Henning Christiansen	1932	2008	Danish		
James Douglas	1932	2022	Scottish		
Sylvia Glickman	1932	2006	American		
Alexander Goehr	1932	2024	English		
Pelle Gudmundsen-Holmgreen	1932	2016	Danish		
André Hajdu	1932	2016	Israeli		
Ruth Watson Henderson	1932		Canadian		
Wojciech Kilar	1932	2013	Polish		
Marek Kopelent	1932	2023	Czech		
Bronius Kutavičius	1932	2021	Lithuanian		
Henri Lazarof	1932	2013	Bulgarian		
Richard Meale	1932	2009	Australian		
Per Nørgård	1932	2025	Danish		
Pauline Oliveros	1932	2016	American		
Éliane Radigue	1932	2026	French		
Lalo Schifrin	1932	2025	Argentine		
Rodion Shchedrin	1932	2025	Russian		
Sergei Slonimsky	1932	2020	Russian		
Gilles Tremblay	1932	2017	Canadian		
John Williams	1932		American	Star Wars, Catch Me If You Can, Concerto for Horn and Orchestra, Harry Potter, Soundings, Air and Simple Gifts	
Hugh Wood	1932	2020	British		
Luigi Zaninelli	1932		American		
Jonathan Elkus	1931		American		
Alida Vázquez	1931	2018	Mexican		
Awatef Abdel Karim	1931	2021	Egyptian		
Derek Holman	1931	2019	English		
Nancy Laird Chance	1931		American		
Louis W. Ballard	1931	2007	American		
Martin Boykan	1931	2021	American	Piano Trio No. 3, Rites of Passage; Piano Sonata No. 3; Sonata for violin and piano No. 2	
Donald Harris	1931	2016	American		
Maria Dolores Malumbres	1931	2019	Spanish		
Felicia Donceanu	1931	2022	Romanian		
Frederick A. Fox	1931	2011	American		
Rudolf Komorous	1931		Canadian		
Young-ja Lee	1931		South Korean		
Arthur Weisberg	1931	2009	American		
Yüksel Koptagel	1931		Turkish		
Raoul Pleskow	1930	2022	Austrian-born American		
Yuriy Oliynyk	1931	2021	Ukrainian		
Robert Gauldin	1931	2025	American		
F. R. C. Clarke	1931	2009	Canadian		
Voki Kostić	1931	2010	Serbian		
Román Alís	1931	2006	Spanish		
David Baker	1931	2016	American		
Vytautas Barkauskas	1931	2020	Lithuanian		
Sylvano Bussotti	1931	2021	Italian		
Charles Camilleri	1931	2009	Maltese		
Lucien Goethals	1931	2006	Belgian		
Sofia Gubaidulina	1931	2025	Russian		
Hikaru Hayashi	1931	2012	Japanese		
Anthony Hedges	1931	2019	British		
Josef Maria Horváth	1931	2019	Hungarian		
Mauricio Kagel	1931	2008	German-Argentine		
Rudolf Kelterborn	1931	2021	Swiss		
André Laporte	1931		Belgian		
Alvin Lucier	1931	2021	American		
David Lumsdaine	1931	2024	Australian		
Donald Martino	1931	2005	American		
Arne Nordheim	1931	2010	Norwegian		
Ib Nørholm	1931	2019	Danish		
Ivo Petrić	1931	2018	Slovenian		
Makoto Shinohara	1931	2024	Japanese		
Sándor Szokolay	1931	2013	Hungarian		
Yuzo Toyama	1931	2023	Japanese		
Peter Westergaard	1931	2019	American		
Malcolm Williamson	1931	2003	Australian		
Lorin Maazel	1930	2014	American		
Gerardo Guevara	1930	2024	Ecuadorian		
Dwight Gustafson	1930	2014	American		
Yen Lu	1930	2008	Chinese-born Taiwanese		
Gudrun Lund	1930	2020	Danish		
Joan Franks Williams	1930	2003	American		
John Carmichael	1930		Australian		
Pieter van der Staak	1930	2007	Dutch		
Betty Roe	1930	2026	English		
Antoinette Kirkwood	1930	2014	English		
Ryōhei Hirose	1930	2008	Japanese		
Muhal Richard Abrams	1930	2017	American		
Petar Bergamo	1930	2022	Croatian		
Claude Bolling	1930	2020	French		
Clotilde Rosa	1930	2017	Portuguese		
Jorma Panula	1930		Finnish		
Makoto Moroi	1930	2013	Japanese		
Walter Sear	1930	2010	American		
Nancy Van de Vate	1930	2023	American		
Ben Steinberg	1930	2023	Canadian		
Hifumi Shimoyama	1930	2023	Japanese		
Usko Meriläinen	1930	2004	Finnish		
Günter Kochan	1930	2009	German		
Ruth Lomon	1930	2017	Canadian		
Johnny Arthey	1930	2007	British		
Jacqueline Fontyn	1930		Belgian		
Robert Cogan	1930	2021	American		
Dick Raaymakers	1930	2013	Dutch		
Richard Felciano	1930	2026	American		
David Amram	1930		American		
Robert Ashley	1930	2014	American		
Larry Austin	1930	2018	American		
Vera Baeva	1930	2017	Bulgarian		
Jacques Calonne	1930	2022	Belgian		
Dejan Despić	1930	2024	Serbian		
Fernando García	1930		Chilean		
Jean Guillou	1930	2019	French		
Cristóbal Halffter	1930	2021	Spanish		
Gordon Langford	1930	2017	British		
Theo Loevendie	1930		Dutch		
John Mayer	1930	2004	Indian		
Minoru Miki	1930	2011	Japanese		
Luis de Pablo	1930	2021	Spanish		
William P. Perry	1930		American		
Dieter Schnebel	1930	2018	German		
Eino Tamberg	1930	2010	Estonian		
Frederick C. Tillis	1930	2020	American		
Veljo Tormis	1930	2017	Estonian		
Heinz Werner Zimmermann	1930	2022	German		
Dinos Constantinides	1929	2021	Greek-American		
Dušan Radić	1929	2010	Serbian		
Irma Urteaga	1929	2022	Argentine		
Carlton Gamer	1929	2023	American		
Hormoz Farhat	1929	2021	Iranian		
Josef Anton Riedl	1929	2016	German		
Erling Bjerno	1929	2019	Danish		
Antonio Braga	1929	2009	Italian		
Augustyn Bloch	1929	2006	Polish		
Leonard Kastle	1929	2011	American		
Pierrette Mari	1929		French		
Ron Nelson	1929	2023	American		
Robert Muczynski	1929	2010	American		
Pedro Iturralde	1929	2020	Spanish		
Teizo Matsumura	1929	2007	Japanese		
Yehudi Wyner	1929		American		
Bogusław Schaeffer	1929	2019	Polish		
Elena Petrová	1929	2002	Czech		
Hans Stadlmair	1929	2019	Austrian	Miro, Trumpet Concerto	
Tage Nielsen	1929	2003	Danish		
Ernst Mahle	1929	2025	Brazilian		
Ctirad Kohoutek	1929	2011	Czech		
Mark Kopytman	1929	2011	Israeli		
Charles Knox	1929	2019	American		
Paul Nelson	1929	2008	American		
Marc Wilkinson	1929	2022	Australian		
Petr Eben	1929	2007	Czech		
Sigurd Berge	1929	2002	Norwegian		
Geghuni Hovannesi Chitchian	1929		Armenian		
Mervyn Burtch	1929	2015	Welsh		
Siegrid Ernst	1929	2022	German		
Alcides Lanza	1929	2024	Canadian		
George Crumb	1929	2022	American		
Frédéric Devreese	1929	2021	Belgian		
Luc Ferrari	1929	2005	French-Italian		
Giorgio Gaslini	1929	2014	Italian		
Rifaat Garrana	1929	2017	Egyptian		
Jerry Goldsmith	1929	2004	American		
Alun Hoddinott	1929	2008	Welsh		
Donald Keats	1929	2018	American		
Henri Pousseur	1929	2009	Belgian		
André Previn	1929	2019	German-American		
James K. Randall	1929	2014	American		
Peter Sculthorpe	1929	2014	Australian		
Siegfried Strohbach	1929	2019	German		
James Yannatos	1929	2011	American		
Joji Yuasa	1929	2024	Japanese		
Gerd Zacher	1929	2014	German		
Ruth Anderson	1928	2019	American		
Euel Box	1928	2017	American		
Gareth Walters	1928	2012	Welsh		
Osian Ellis	1928	2021	Welsh		
Karl Korte	1928	2022	American		
Bidzina Kvernadze	1928	2010	Georgian		
Beverly Grigsby	1928	2022	American		
Nadežka Mosusova	1928		Serbian		
Du Mingxin	1928		Chinese		
David Farquhar	1928	2007	New Zealander		
Raymond Warren	1928	2025	British		
Henk van Lijnschooten	1928	2006	Dutch		
Thomas Rajna	1928	2021	Hungarian		
Adelaide Pereira da Silva	1928	2021	Brazilian		
Peter Tahourdin	1928	2009	English-born Australian		
Yevgeny Svetlanov	1928	2002	Russian		
Ernest Sauter	1928	2013	German		
Zlata Tkach	1928	2006	Moldovan		
Antonín Tučapský	1928	2014	Czech		
Jay Sydeman	1928	2021	American		
Zdeněk Lukáš	1928	2007	Czech		
Kamilló Lendvay	1928	2016	Hungarian		
Frigyes Hidas	1928	2007	Hungarian		
Luna Alcalay	1928	2012	Croatian born Austrian		
Jean-Michel Damase	1928	2013	French		
Sarah Feigin	1928	2011	Latvian		
James Cohn	1928	2021	American		
Frank Michael Beyer	1928	2008	German		
T. J. Anderson	1928		American		
Avni Mula	1928	2020	Albanian		
Samuel Adler	1928		German-American	A Bridge to Understanding, All Nature Plays, Drifting on Winds and Currents, In the Spirit of Bach	Works for Orchestra
George Dreyfus	1928		Australian		
Valentin Gheorghiu	1928	2023	Romanian		
Guo Zurong	1928		Chinese		
Ennio Morricone	1928	2020	Italian		
Thea Musgrave	1928		Scottish		
Einojuhani Rautavaara	1928	2016	Finnish		
Ezra Sims	1928	2015	American		
Ronald Stevenson	1928	2015	British		
Karlheinz Stockhausen	1928	2007	German	Sonntag aus Licht; Klang; Fünf weitere Sternzeichen	
Tommy Tycho	1928	2013	Hungarian-Australian		
Ilja Bergh	1927	2015	Danish		
Bernard Parmegiani	1927	2013	French		
Wayne Peterson	1927	2021	American		
William Ennis Thomson	1927	2019	American		
Elaine Hugh-Jones	1927	2021	Welsh		
André Almuró	1927	2009	French		
Dolores Claman	1927	2021	Canadian		
John Diercks	1927	2020	American		
Bernhard Lewkovitch	1927	2024	Danish		
Janet Maguire	1927	2019	Austrian		
Beatrice Ohanessian	1927	2008	Iraqi Armenian		
Dagvyn Luvsansharav	1927	2014	Mongolian		
George Balch Wilson	1927	2021	American		
Mary Jeanne van Appledorn	1927	2014	American		
Joe Maneri	1927	2009	American		
Vlastimil Lejsek	1927	2010	Czech		
Wilhelm Killmayer	1927	2017	German	Song cycles	
Walter Hartley	1927	2016	American		
Donald Erb	1927	2008	American		
Emma Lou Diemer	1927	2024	American		
Paul Angerer	1927	2017	Austrian		
Dominick Argento	1927	2019	American		
Tzvi Avni	1927		Israeli		
John Beckwith	1927	2022	Canadian		
Pascal Bentoiu	1927	2016	Romanian		
Gunnar Bucht	1927		Swedish		
John W. Downey	1927	2004	American		
Michael Gielen	1927	2019	Austrian		
Pierre Henry	1927	2017	French		
John Joubert	1927	2019	British		
Erkki Ertama	1927	2010	Finnish		
Osvaldo Lacerda	1927	2011	Brazilian		
Ștefan Niculescu	1927	2010	Romanian	Ison II	
Eva Schorr	1927	2016	German		
Margrit Zimmermann	1927	2020	Swiss		
Maria de Lourdes Martins	1926	2009	Portuguese		Female composer
Edward Bland	1926	2013	American		
Brian Bonsor	1926	2011	Scottish		
Earle Brown	1926	2002	American		
Zhun Huang	1926	2024	Chinese		
Werner Kaegi	1926	2024	Swiss		
Janine Charbonnier	1926	2022	French		
Francis Dhomont	1926	2023	French		
William O. Smith	1926	2020	American		
Natela Svanidze	1926	2017	Georgian		
Karl Kohn	1926	2024	American		
Oldřich František Korte	1926	2014	Czech		
Cornel Trăilescu	1926	2019	Romanian		
Hans Otte	1926	2007	German		
Robert Wykes	1926	2021	American		
Čestmír Gregor	1926	2011	Czech		
William Schmidt	1926	2009	American		
Marga Richter	1926	2020	American		
Ben-Zion Orgad	1926	2006	Israeli		
Carmen Petra Basacopol	1926	2023	Romanian		
Janez Matičič	1926	2022	Slovenian		
Meyer Kupferman	1926	2003	American		
Lee Hoiby	1926	2011	American		
Stanley Glasser	1926	2018	South African		
İlhan Mimaroğlu	1926	2012	Turkish		
Herbert H. Ágústsson	1926	2017	Icelandic		
Garbis Aprikian	1926	2024	Armenian		
Edwin Carr	1926	2003	New Zealander		
Jacques Castérède	1926	2014	French		
Friedrich Cerha	1926	2023	Austrian		
Carlisle Floyd	1926	2021	American		
Eric Gross	1926	2011	Austrian-Australian		
Hans Werner Henze	1926	2012	German	Phaedra	
Ben Johnston	1926	2019	American		
Betsy Jolas	1926		French		
Gottfried Michael Koenig	1926	2021	German-Dutch		
György Kurtág	1926		Hungarian		
Celso Garrido Lecca	1926	2025	Peruvian		
Rolv Yttrehus	1926	2018	American		
Aleksandr Zatsepin	1926		Russian		
Ruth Zechlin	1926	2007	German		
Marilyn J. Ziffrin	1926	2018	American		
Doming Lam	1926	2023	Chinese (Macau)		
Florentín Giménez	1925	2021	Paraguayan		
Ginette Keller	1925	2010	French		
Tristram Cary	1925	2008	English-Australian		
Clytus Gottwald	1925	2023	German		
Vladimir Shainsky	1925	2017	Russian		
Hale Smith	1925	2009	American		
Włodzimierz Kotoński	1925	2014	Polish		
Teo Macero	1925	2008	American		
Ivo Malec	1925	2019	French		
Frank Lewin	1925	2008	American		
Ernie Stires	1925	2008	American		
Louis Barron	1925	2008	American		
Hilda Dianda	1925	2014	Argentine		
Amada Santos Ocampo	1925	2009	Philippine		
Nguyễn Văn Quỳ	1925	2022	Vietnamese	Sonatas Nos. 8 and 9 for violin and piano	
Claudio Spies	1925	2020	Chilean-American		
Miroslav Miletić	1925	2018	Croatian		
William Mayer	1925	2017	American		
Eloy Fominaya	1925	2002	American		
Jindřich Feld	1925	2007	Czech		
Antoine Duhamel	1925	2014	French		
Charles Chaynes	1925	2016	French		
Edith Borroff	1925	2019	American		
Allan Blank	1925	2013	American		
Gustavo Becerra-Schmidt	1925	2010	Chilean		
Luciano Berio	1925	2003	Italian	Piano Sonata; Sequenza XIV for cello	
Pierre Boulez	1925	2016	French	Incises; Dérive 2	
Aldo Clementi	1925	2011	Italian		
Marius Constant	1925	2004	French-Romanian		
Andrei Eshpai	1925	2015	Russian		
Emmanuel Ghent	1925	2003	Canadian		
Ron Goodwin	1925	2003	British		
Svatopluk Havelka	1925	2009	Czech		
Bertold Hummel	1925	2002	German		
Giselher Klebe	1925	2009	German		
Kirke Mechem	1925		American		
Gunther Schuller	1925	2015	American		
Mikis Theodorakis	1925	2021	Greek		
Paul W. Whear	1925	2021	American		
Milko Kelemen	1924	2018	Croatian	Tromberia for Trumpet and Orchestra	
Noël Lee	1924	2013	American		
Hugh Aitken	1924	2012	American		
Charles L. Bestor	1924	2016	American		
Gladys Nordenstrom	1924	2016	American		Female composer
Jeanne Colin-De Clerck	1924		Belgian		
Benjamin Lees	1924	2010	American		
Riichiro Manabe	1924	2015	Japanese		
Arthur Frackenpohl	1924	2019	American		
Stanley Hollingsworth	1924	2003	American		
Ernest Tomlinson	1924	2015	English		
Krystyna Moszumańska-Nazar	1924	2009	Polish		
Michael Amissah	1924	1993	Ghanaian		
Ruth Schönthal	1924	2006	German		
Erzsébet Szőnyi	1924	2019	Hungarian		
Yehoshua Lakner	1924	2003	Israeli		
Axel Borup-Jørgensen	1924	2012	Danish		
Enriko Josif	1924	2003	Serbian		
Zhivka Klinkova	1924	2002	Bulgarian		
Claude Abravanel	1924	2012	Swiss		
Leni Alexander	1924	2005	German-Chilean		
Claude Ballif	1924	2004	French		
Altamiro Carrilho	1924	2012	Brazilian		
Stephen Dodgson	1924	2013	British		
Heimo Erbse	1924	2005	German		
Egil Hovland	1924	2013	Norwegian		
Klaus Huber	1924	2017	Swiss		
Maurice Jarre	1924	2009	French		
Ezra Laderman	1924	2015	American		
Franco Mannino	1924	2005	Italian		
Angela Morley	1924	2009	British		
Serge Nigg	1924	2008	French		
Eugene Kurtz	1923	2006	American		
William Kraft	1923	2022	American	Encounters	
Isaac Schwartz	1923	2009	Ukrainian		
Jan Boerman	1923	2020	Dutch		
Teresa Borràs i Fornell	1923	2010	American		
James Clifford Brown	1923	2004	English		
Ludmila Ulehla	1923	2009	American		
Triphon Silyanovski	1923	2005	Bulgarian		
Gerhard Wimberger	1923	2016	Austrian		
Jean Catoire	1923	2005	French		
Chou Wen-chung	1923	2019	Chinese/American		
Jean Eichelberger Ivey	1923	2010	American		
Flavio Testi	1923	2014	Italian		
James Stevens	1923	2012	English		
Reid N. Nibley	1923	2008	American		
Phil Nimmons	1923	2024	Canadian		
Viktor Kalabis	1923	2006	Czech		
Dika Newlin	1923	2006	American		
Arthur Butterworth	1923	2014	English		
Leslie Bassett	1923	2016	American		
Carlos Bonilla Chávez	1923	2010	Ecuadorian		
Warren Barker	1923	2006	American		
Henryk Czyż	1923	2003	Polish		
Simeon ten Holt	1923	2012	Dutch		
György Ligeti	1923	2006	Hungarian		
Ursula Mamlok	1923	2016	German-born, American		
Kenneth G. Mills	1923	2004	Canadian		
Daniel Pinkham	1923	2006	American		
Ned Rorem	1923	2022	American		
Friedrich Zehm	1923	2007	German		
Anna Gordy Gaye	1922	2014	American		
Raffaello de Banfield	1922	2008	English		
Antonio Bibalo	1922	2008	Italian-Norwegian		
John Boda	1922	2002	American		
Kelsey Jones	1922	2004	Canadian		
Doreen Carwithen	1922	2003	British		
Tale Ognenovski	1922	2012	Macedonian		
Eric Jupp	1922	2003	British		
James Wilson	1922	2005	Irish		
Francis Thorne	1922	2017	American		
George Walker	1922	2018	American		
Felix Werder	1922	2012	German-born Australian		
Otmar Mácha	1922	2006	Czech		
Leo Kraft	1922	2014	American		
Lars Edlund	1922	2013	Swedish		
Odette Gartenlaub	1922	2014	French		
Wim Franken	1922	2012	Dutch		
Edvard Hagerup Bull	1922	2012	Norwegian		
Yehezkel Braun	1922	2014	Israeli		
Sadao Bekku	1922	2012	Japanese		
Sol Berkowitz	1922	2006	American		
Ester Mägi	1922	2021	Estonian		
Gérard Calvi	1922	2015	French		
Lukas Foss	1922	2009	German-American		
Stefans Grové	1922	2014	South African		
Ilja Hurník	1922	2013	Czech		
Gilberto Mendes	1922	2016	Brazilian		
Zhu Jian'er	1922	2017	Chinese		
Marcel Bitsch	1921	2011	French		
Adrienne Clostre	1921	2006	French		Female composer
Ariel Ramírez	1921	2010	Argentine		
Antony Hopkins	1921	2014	British		
Hans Ulrich Engelmann	1921	2011	German		
Mustafa Krantja	1921	2002	Albanian		
Edward Salim Michael	1921	2006	French		
Will Ogdon	1921	2013	American		
Douglas Townsend	1921	2012	American		
Kaljo Raid	1921	2005	Estonian		
Alfred Reed	1921	2005	American		
Roger Nixon	1921	2009	American		
Richard Rudolf Klein	1921	2011	German		
Ingvar Lidholm	1921	2017	Swedish		
Kan Ishii	1921	2009	Japanese		
Crawford Gates	1921	2018	American		
Fernando Corrêa de Oliveira	1921	2004	Portuguese		
William Blezard	1921	2003	British		
Jack Beeson	1921	2010	American		
Seymour Barab	1921	2014	American		
Dorothea Austin	1921	2011	Austrian-born American		
Douglas Allanbrook	1921	2003	American		
Chaya Arbel	1921	2007	Israeli		
Malcolm Arnold	1921	2006	British	9 symphonies, other orchestral suites; opera; chamber music	Tonal with conservative formal concerns
Halim El-Dabh	1921	2017	Egyptian-American		
Oscar Feltsman	1921	2013	Russian		
Karel Husa	1921	2016	Czech-American		
Andrew Imbrie	1921	2007	American		
Edvard Mirzoyan	1921	2012	Armenian		
Ralph Shapey	1921	2002	American		
İlhan Usmanbaş	1921	2025	Turkish		
Donald H. White	1921	2016	American		
J. Durward Morsch	1920	2015	American		
Dave Brubeck	1920	2012	American		
Dorothea Anne Franchi	1920	2003	New Zealander		Female composer
Karen Khachaturian	1920	2011	Soviet and Russian		
John Lessard	1920	2003	American		
Rolande Falcinelli	1920	2006	French		
Robert Turner	1920	2012	Canadian		
Robert Mann	1920	2018	American		
Robert Moevs	1920	2007	American		
John La Montaine	1920	2013	American		
Alexander Arutiunian	1920	2012	Armenian		
Jacob Gilboa	1920	2007	Israeli		
Ravi Shankar	1920	2012	Indian		
Harold Shapero	1920	2013	American		
Helen Tobias-Duesberg	1919	2010	Estonian-American		Female composer
Bernard Barrell	1919	2005	English		
Jacob Avshalomov	1919	2013	American		
Udo Kasemets	1919	2014	Estonian-born Canadian		
István Anhalt	1919	2012	Hungarian-Canadian		
Talivaldis Kenins	1919	2008	Latvian-Canadian		
Leon Kirchner	1919	2009	American		
Juan Orrego-Salas	1919	2019	Chilean		
Jiří Pauer	1919	2007	Czech		
Galina Ustvolskaya	1919	2006	Russian		
Lina Pires de Campos	1918	2003	Brazilian		
Lucrecia Roces Kasilag	1918	2008	Filipino		
Joseph Willard Roosevelt	1918	2008	American		
Francisco Llácer Pla	1918	2002	Spanish		
Marcelo Koc	1918	2006	Argentinian		
Augustin Kubizek	1918	2009	Austrian		
Jürg Baur	1918	2010	German		
Milton DeLugg	1918	2015	American		
Jórunn Viðar	1918	2017	Icelandic		
Liviu Comes	1918	2004	Romanian		
Harold Gramatges	1918	2008	Cuban		
George Rochberg	1918	2005	American		
Erna Woll	1917	2005	German		Female composer
José Maceda	1917	2004	Filipino		
Clarisse Leite	1917	2003	Brazilian		
Henri Betti	1917	2005	French		
Robert Ward	1917	2013	American		
Geraldine Mucha	1917	2012	Scottish		
Oskar Morawetz	1917	2007	Canadian		
Samuel Dolin	1917	2002	Canadian		
Anton Coppola	1917	2020	American		
Hidayat Inayat Khan	1917	2016	English		
Richard Arnell	1917	2009	British		
Roque Cordero	1917	2008	Panamanian		
Robert Farnon	1917	2005	Canadian		
John Gardner	1917	2011	British		
Lou Harrison	1917	2003	American		
Eta Tyrmand	1917	2008	Belarusian		
Reginald Smith Brindle	1917	2003	British		
Irwin Swack	1916	2006	American		
Carin Malmlöf-Forssling	1916	2005	Swedish		
Gonchigiin Birvaa	1916	2006	Mongolian		
Jan Håkan Åberg	1916	2012	Swedish		
William Presser	1916	2004	American		
Ian Parrott	1916	2012	Anglo-Welsh		
Helmut Eder	1916	2005	Austrian		
Roman Toi	1916	2018	Canadian		
Denis ApIvor	1916	2004	British		
Milton Babbitt	1916	2011	American		
Henri Dutilleux	1916	2013	French		
Veli Mukhatov	1916	2005	Turkmenistani		
Štěpán Rak	1916	2008	Canadian		
René Touzet	1916	2003	Cuban-American		
Robert Strassburg	1915	2003	American		
Alexander Brott	1915	2005	Canadian		
Robert Moffat Palmer	1915	2010	American		
Ebbe Grims-land	1915	2015	Swedish		
Abel Ehrlich	1915	2003	Israeli		
José Bragato	1915	2017	Italian-born Argentine		
David Diamond	1915	2005	American		
Grigory Frid	1915	2012	Russian		
Jan Hanuš	1915	2004	Czech		
Knut Nystedt	1915	2014	Norwegian		
George Perle	1915	2009	American		
Alan Shulman	1915	2002	American		
Berthe di Vito-Delvaux	1915	2005	Belgian		
Wilfrid Mellers	1914	2008	English		
Akira Ifukube	1914	2006	Japanese		
Hermann Haller	1914	2002	Swiss		
Cacilda Borges Barbosa	1914	2010	Brazilian		
Riccardo Malipiero	1914	2003	Italian		
Josée Vigneron-Ramackers	1914	2002	Belgian		
Lucio D. San Pedro	1913	2002	Filipino		
Matilde Capuis	1913	2017	Italian		
Kent Kennan	1913	2003	American		
Ernest van der Eyken	1913	2010	Belgian		
Bruno Bettinelli	1913	2004	Italian		
Jan Ekier	1913	2014	Polish		
Henry Brant	1913	2008	American	Ice Field	
Norman Dello Joio	1913	2008	American		
Miriam Hyde	1913	2005	Australian		
Tikhon Khrennikov	1913	2007	Russian		
Gardner Read	1913	2005	American		
Witold Rudziński	1913	2004	Polish		
John Weinzweig	1913	2006	Canadian		
Sirvart Kalpakyan Karamanuk	1912	2008	Armenian		
Zoltán Pongrácz	1912	2007	Hungarian		
Robert Hughes	1912	2007	Scottish-born Australian		
Arthur Berger	1912	2003	American		
Tauno Marttinen	1912	2008	Finnish		
Xavier Montsalvatge	1912	2002	Spanish		
Louis Moyse	1912	2007	French		
Robert McBride	1911	2007	American		
Erik Bergman	1911	2006	Finnish		
Roberto García Morillo	1911	2003	Argentine		
Jan Koetsier	1911	2006	Dutch		
Gian Carlo Menotti	1911	2007	Italian-American		
Anatoly Bogatyrev	1910	2003	Belarusian		
Patricia Blomfield Holt	1910	2003	Canadian		
Vilém Tauský	1910	2004	Czech		
Leon Stein	1910	2002	American		
Otto Joachim	1910	2010	German-born Canadian		
Werner Wolf Glaser	1910	2006	Swedish		
Erland von Koch	1910	2009	Swedish		
H. Owen Reed	1910	2014	American		
Meinrad Schütter	1910	2006	Swiss		
Josef Tal	1910	2008	Israeli		
Todor Skalovski	1909	2004	Macedonian		
Maria Dziewulska	1909	2006	Polish		
Isabel Aretz	1909	2005	Argentine-Venezuelan		
Ljubica Marić	1909	2003	Serbian		
Robin Orr	1909	2006	Scottish		
Jean Berger	1909	2002	German		
Harald Genzmer	1909	2007	German		
Kurt Schwaen	1909	2007	German		
Joan Mary Last	1908	2002	English		
Alice Samter	1908	2004	German		
Trude Rittmann	1908	2005	German		
Jean-Yves Daniel-Lesur	1908	2002	French		
Roberta Bitgood	1908	2007	American		
Elliott Carter	1908	2012	American		
Jeronimas Kačinskas	1907	2005	Lithuanian-born American		
Lora Aborn	1907	2005	American		
Roy Douglas	1907	2015	British		
Bernhard Christensen	1906	2004	Danish		
Normand Lockwood	1906	2002	American		
Arnold Cooke	1906	2005	British		
Murray Adaskin	1906	2002	Canadian		
Joaquim Homs	1906	2003	Spanish		
Manuel Rosenthal	1904	2003	French		
Goffredo Petrassi	1904	2003	Italian		
Mykola Kolessa	1903	2006	Ukrainian		
Jenő Takács	1902	2005	Austrian		
Aurelio de la Vega	1925	2022	Cuban-American		
Steve Heitzeg	1959		American	Nobel Symphony	
Bear McCreary	1979		American	Battlestar Galactica, Agents of S.H.I.E.L.D., Outlander, The Lord of the Rings: The Rings of Power, Call of Duty: Vanguard	Composer of film, television, and video game scores.
James Horner	1953	2015	American	James Cameron's Titanic, James Cameron's Avatar, Apollo 13 (film), Braveheart, Legends of the Fall, Jumanji, A Beautiful Mind (film), Mighty Joe Young (1998 film), The Mask of Zorro, Field of Dreams (film)	Composer of film, television scores.
Ola Gjeilo	1978		Norwegian		
Caleb Burhans	1980		American		
Bryce Dessner	1976		American		
Daníel Bjarnason	1979		Icelandic		
Thomas Adès	1971		British		
Ryan Lott	1979		American		
Kim André Arnesen	1980		Norwegian		
James Whitbourn	1963		British		
Jane Antonia Cornish	1975		English		
Richard Reed Parry	1977		Canadian		
Judd Greenstein	1979		American		
Missy Mazzoli	1980		American		
Christopher Cerrone	1984		American		
Anna Thorvaldsdottir	1977		Icelandic		
Jessie Montgomery	1981		American		
Sarah Kirkland Snider	1973		American		
Daniel Wohl	1980		French		
Ted Hearne	1982		American		
Angélica Negrón	1981		American	Campos Flotantes, Azul Naranja Salado, Agua, Inward Pieces, Hierbas Marinas	Female composer and multi-instrumentalist born in San Juan, Puerto Rico
Christopher Tin	1976		American	Baba Yetu, Calling All Dawns, The Drop That Contained the Sea, To Shiver the Sky, The Lost Birds	Two time Grammy winner, recipient of Fulbright Scholarship
Raquel García-Tomás	1984		Spanish	Alexina B.	
Jonathan Leshnoff	1973		American		
Gavin Higgins	1983		British		
Sergio Cervetti	1940		Uruguayan-born; American	Consolamentum, Elegy for a Prince, Gated Angel, Nazca	
Jasmine Arielle Barnes	1991		American	She Who Dared	
Adam Gorb	1958		Welsh	Anya 17	

== See also ==
- Contemporary classical music
- List of acousmatic-music composers
- List of 20th-century classical composers
