= Violaine Prince =

French-Lebanese composer (born 1958)

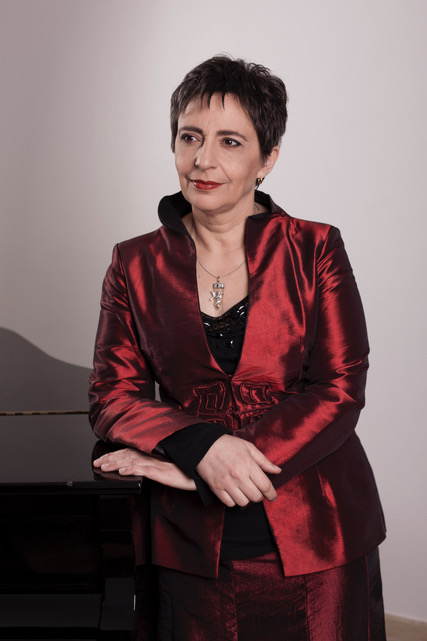
Violaine Prince

Violaine Prince (born January 2, 1958, in Beirut) is a professor in natural language processing at the University Montpellier 2, and a Franco-Lebanese composer of contemporary sacred and secular music.

== Biography ==
Violaine Prince was born in Beirut, she is the daughter of Moussa Prince, a lawyer and criminologist, and Marie-Ange Abou-Saleh, the Director of the Institute of Social Sciences at the Lebanese University. She left Lebanon in 1976.

== Works ==
- Arabesques. Cycle du jour. Violin Sonatas
- De Profundis.
- Requiem
