= Gonchigiin Birvaa =

Mongolian composer

Gonchigiin Birvaa (Mongolian: Гончигийн Бирваа; 1916 - 2006) was a Mongolian composer. Described as a "prominent composer", he was said to have composed based on the memoirs of Professor P. Khorloo. His best known work is perhaps the ballet Khoshuu Naadam and the musical Queen's Black Destiny, based on a Mongolian legend, which he composed and was written after his death by Damdin Törbat in 1983. He was also an author or co-author of the books Khödöö Tiish (1966), Manai duu - manai tüükh (1982), and Zandan shoo (1985). His son is Birvaagiin Mönkhbold.
