= Gastón Arce Sejas =

Bolivian performer

Gastón Arce Sejas (born December 25, 1964) is a Bolivian performer, conductor, pedagogue and composer of contemporary music. His work is considered one of the main references of Bolivia’s modern music of the last two decades.

He was born in La Paz, after taking private lessons of music theory, piano and viola in his youth, he began formal musical studies in 1983 at La Plata's National University, Faculty of Beaux Arts in Argentina, under the guidance of Argentinian composer Mariano Etkin. He returned to Bolivia in 1991, shortly after obtaining a degree in Composition, Orchestral Conducting and Musical Morphology, being appointed as Professor of Composition in the National Conservatory of Music located in the city of La Paz. Currently he is the Dean of the Loyola University's Faculty of Music in La Paz.
