= Helmut Calabrese =

American composer

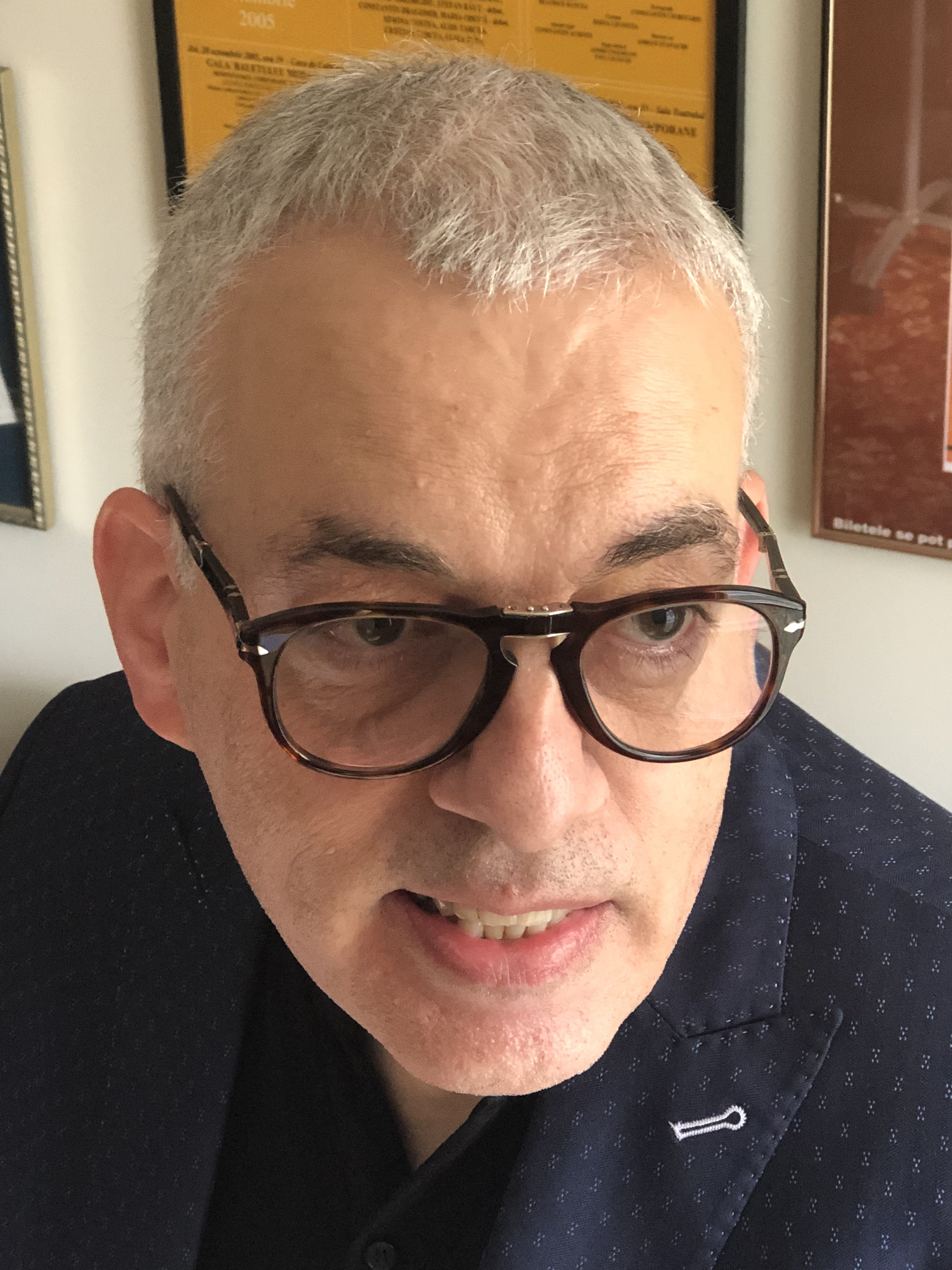
Helmut C. Calabrese

Helmut Christoferus Calabrese (born 1957) is a German-born composer and poet who immigrated to the U.S. in 1962. He trained at the Philadelphia College of Performing Arts and at New York University and is one of the founders of the music publishers Calabrese Brothers Music, LLC.

His song, "The Most Beautiful Lady in the World: Statue of Liberty Anthem", was the subject of two bills in the New Jersey Legislature and the United States House of Representatives calling on the United States Congress to designate it as the official anthem of the Statue of Liberty. The Philadelphia Inquirer said of it: "The music sounds like a love ballad, but the lyrics are a flag waving salute to America". It was performed at Liberty State Park in July 1986 as part of the Statue of Liberty centennial celebration.

== Compositions ==
=== Instrumental music ===
- Seeking for Solo Drumset, 2009, dedicated to Peter Jarvis, 5 minutes duration
- Time for Solo Clarinet in B flat, 2008, 8 minutes in duration
- Mudgrave for Marimba and Vibraphone, 2007, dedicated to Peter Jarvis, 5 minutes in duration
- Love's Tango for Orchestra, 2007, 3 minutes in duration
- Tears of Love for Orchestra, 2007, 3 minutes in duration
- A Little Night Music for Solo Timpani, 2005, dedicated to Peter Jarvis, 10 minutes duration
- There Is Love for Solo Piano, 2005, 3 minutes
- Easter Praises for String Quartet, 1994, 16 minutes in duration
- Vice Versus for Cello and Double Bass, 1992, 10 minutes in duration
- Band AIDS for Oboe and Violoncello, 1987, 7 minutes in duration
- XLM for Solo Alto Saxophone, 1987, Saxophone, 6 minutes in duration
- Five Answers: Cat's Cradle for Brass Quintet, 1987, 2 Trumpets, French Hn., Trombone, and Tuba, 15 min.
- Being for Solo Flute, 1986, 4 minutes in duration
- Folk Songs for Solo Piano, 1986, 7 minutes in duration
- Fugue I for Oboe, Clarinet, Bassoon, and Horn in F, 1984, 7 minutes in duration
- A Song for Piano and Violin, 1981, 4 minutes in duration
- The Struggle for Solo Piano, 1980, 10 minutes in duration
- Senza Resolto for Three Trumpets, 1980, 3 minutes in duration
- Contrapuntal Suite for Woodwind Trio, 1979, 12 minutes in duration
- Brass Septet, 1978, 8 minutes in duration
- Brass Sextet, 1978, 7 minutes in duration
- Esss for Orchestra, 1978, 10 minutes in duration
- Five Pieces for Orchestra, 1978, 10 minutes in duration
- Phantasie for Clarinet, Two Pianos, and Percussion, 1977, 8 minutes in duration
- Tone for Solo Tuba, 1977, 7 minutes in duration
- New Music for Four Trumpets, Horn in F, Piano, and Two Percussionists, 7 minutes in durations
- Orchestral Variations for String Orchestra, 1977, 7 minutes in duration
- Six Studies for Piano and Violin, 1977, 12 minutes in duration
- Flute Solo I, 1976, 5 minutes in duration
- Prelude II for Piano, 1975, 3 minutes in duration
- Prelude I for Piano, 1975, 3 minutes in duration

=== Vocal music ===
- Praise the Lord, SATB, 2009, 3 minutes in duration
- For the Lord Hath Chosen Sion, 2007, 3 minutes in duration
- Ave Maria, for voice and piano, 2003
- Elephant Song, a children's song, for voice and piano, 2003
- On Christmas Day, words by Paul L. Calabrese, 2003, 3 minutes in duration
- Songs of Age, setting the W.B. Yeats poems: Three Things, 2003, When You Are Old, 1981, and The Old Men Admiring Themselves in the Water, 1981, 12 minutes in duration
- Divine Mercy, A Hymn, 1997, 4 minutes in duration
- Flowers that Cry for Tenor or Soprano, Clarinet in Bb, and Piano, words by H. C. Calabrese, 1987, 7 minutes
- Lisa and Joey, words by Paul L. Calabrese, 1986, 3 minutes in duration
- America the Great, words by Paul L. Calabrese, 1986, 3 minutes in duration
- The Most Beautiful Lady in the World, words by Paul L. Calabrese, 1985, 3 minutes in duration
- Honey and Salt, four songs for Soprano, words by Carl Sandberg, 1980, 12 minutes in duration
- Anniversary Sketches: Four Comic Studies for Coloratura Soprano and Chamber Orchestra, 1980, 15 minutes
- The Pearl, One-act opera based on the novella by John Steinbeck, 1979, libretto by H. C. Calabrese, 1979, 1 hour

=== Arrangements for vocal music ===
- America the Beautiful, for High Voice, words by Katherine L. Bates and music by Samuel A. Ward, 2001, 4 minutes in duration
- I Believe in You, A Song for Soprano, words and music by H. Alexander Murphy, 2001, 3 minutes in duration
- I Don't Need Roses, A Song for Soprano, words and music by H. Alexander Murphy, 2001, 3 minutes in duration

=== Film music ===
2019 · Cross, (short) Dir. Vincent Miller · Strays, (short) Dir. Jaylin Pressley, · The Third Date (short), Dir. Ajit Dia (In Progress), · Caretaker (short), Dir. Ashley McCann and Guillermo Aeizaga, · Sentieri Sulle Acque (feature film), Dir. Francesco Russo, Master Movies, S.r.l. (In Progress)

2018

· The Lost Boys (short), Dir. Randy Memoli · Santa Maria (short), Dir. Dean Chen · Composition No. 20 (animation short), Dir. Emma Foo, · Lemming (short), Dir. Ajit Dias, · Casereccio (short), Dir. Stephen Peiris, · Coming Home (short), Dir. Matthew Jenkins, Matthew Jenkins Productions, · Kakuri (short ), Dir. Kaila Shields, McFadden Production,

2012

· West End (Trailer), Dir. Joe Basile, Joe Basile Productions

2010

· Il Gioco È Fatto? (feature film), Dir. Francesco Russo, Master Movies, S.r.l., 2011 Terra di Siena International Film Festival "Best First Work" Award and 2012 Garden State Film Festival Award for "Best Traditional Music"

2006

· Mudgrave at the Beach, (short film), Dir. Nic Pearson, Matthew Krist Productions, · Paper People (short film), · Butterflies (short documentary)

2019 · New Creation: Collected Poems 1975-2019

== Links ==
- “… despre emoţia intâlnirii cu muzicianul Dinu Ghezzo,” July 15, 2012
- Delaney, Bonnie, "AN ODE TO LADY LIBERTY Brothers' Composition has patriotism at its heart", Asbury Park Press, May 29, 2004, p. 5
- Delaney, Bonnie, "Brothers' Composition has patriotism at its heart", Asbury Park Press, June 2, 2004, p. 11
- State of New Jersey, Assembly Concurrent Resolution No. 126, 210th Legislature, September 12, 2002. Synopsis: Calls on Congress to designate "The Most Beautiful Lady in the World-Statue of Liberty Anthem" as official anthem of Statue of Liberty
- State of New Jersey, Senate Concurrent Resolution No. 70, September 19, 2002. Synopsis: Calls on Congress to designate "The Most Beautiful Lady in the World-Statue of Liberty Anthem" as official anthem of Statue of Liberty.
- State of New Jersey, Assembly Concurrent Resolution No. 147, February 24, 2004. Synopsis: Calls on Congress to designate "The Most Beautiful Lady in the World-Statue of Liberty Anthem" as official anthem of Statue of Liberty
