= Erling Bjerno =

Danish composer (1929–2019)

Erling D. Bjerno (1929–2019) is a Danish composer and organist. He trained as an organist and from 1967 to 1996 was employed by Ansgar Church in Aalborg. During the same period, he was employed as a teacher at Nordjysk Music.

As a composer, he was partly self-taught. He made his debut in 1961 with his #1 Symphony. Besides teaching music, chamber music, choral works, and theater, radio, and TV music, he has written symphonies, operas, etc.

He writes in a traditional style, which has not always been well received by the critics.
