= Linda Spevacek =

Linda Spevacek (born 1945) is a composer of modern choral music.

Spevacek has over 1,000 published compositions and arrangements, and has authored seven choral collections, five piano books and six vocal collections. Her latest book written January 2004 is The Choral Director's Guide to Sanity...and Success!, co-authored by Randy Pagel and published by, Heritage Music Press.

Some of Spevacek's compositions are "American Folk Rhapsody" and "Sail on little boat".

Spevacek's arrangements have been performed on the 'MENC World's Largest Concert' nationally televised on PBS. Her works have premiered at conventions of the American Choral Directors Association, the Music Educators National Conference and on The Hour of Power at the Crystal Cathedral. In 1999, she was a featured conductor at Carnegie Hall.
