= Wen Zhanli =

Chinese composer living in Beijing (born 1981)

Wen Zhanli (Chinese: 温展力; pinyin: Wēn Zhǎnlì; born 1981) is a Chinese composer living in Beijing.

== Life ==
Wen Zhanli was born in Beijing and studied music since childhood. He admitted to the composition department at China Conservatory of Music and studied composition in 1999. In 2006, he studied at Darmstadt International Summer Courses for New Music in Germany. He attained a doctor's degree in 2010 from China Conservatory of Music and starting working as a teacher at the composition department.

His music is a variety of styles and genres, including opera, symphony, chamber music, electronic music, chorus, film music, pop song, performance art, conceptual art and new media art. In 2005 and 2007, he held a personal concert twice and won favorable reception. Some of his works premiered and were selected into national and international concert and music festivals including the 2008 Shanghai Spring International Music Festival, 2008 Young China Music Festival in Frankfurt Germany and 2011 Young Composer Project of National Centre for the Performing Arts (China) etc. In 2008 and 2013, he won the excellent prize of music composition of Wenhua Award twice, which is a governmental award conferred by the ministry of culture of China.

== Works ==
- Trumpet Sonata -for trumpet and piano (2002)
- Wind Horse Cattle -for dizi, erhu and pipa (2003)
- Walking Moon -song for tenor and orchestra (2003)
- Another Space -for double bass solo (2004)
- December 16th -conceptual art (2005)
- For Many Hands -performing art (2005)
- Arts Must Come From____Life, Arts Must Beyond____Life -electronic music (2006)
- π -opera in tow scene for soloists and karaoke (2006)
- He and They Look the God of Doorway -electronic music (2007)
- Just What Is It That Makes Our Life So Harmonious -for orchestra (2007)
- I Want Cola, Sir -for string quartet (2008)
- Tiananmen Square, the Sunny Square -for mix choir (2008)
- Symphony No.1 “Superstar” -for orchestra (2010)
