= List of acousmatic-music composers =

A list of notable electroacoustic music and acousmatic composers:

Contents
A	B	C–D	E–F	G–H	I–J	K–L	M	N–Q	R–S	T–U	V–Z

== A ==
- Mohamed Abdelwahab Abdelfattah
- Rodolfo Acosta
- Frédéric Acquaviva
- Monty Adkins
- Klaus Ager
- Javier Álvarez
- Miguel Álvarez-Fernández
- Maryanne Amacher
- Charles Amirkhanian
- Elizabeth Anderson
- Jorge Antunes
- Jon Appleton
- Bülent Arel
- Patrick Ascione
- Robert Ashley
- Larry Austin
- Nigel Ayers

== B ==
- Milton Babbitt
- Claude Ballif
- Clarence Barlow
- Natasha Barrett
- Françoise Barrière
- Louis and Bebe Barron
- Sergio Barroso
- Marc Battier
- François Bayle
- Martin Bédard
- Luciano Berio
- Michael von Biel
- Boris Blacher
- Lars-Gunnar Bodin
- Konrad Boehmer
- Michèle Bokanowski
- André Boucourechliev
- Ned Bouhalassa
- Pierre Boulez
- James Brody
- Herbert Brün
- George Brunner
- Karl Gottfried Brunotte

== C–F ==
- Rodrigo Cadiz
- John Cage
- Christian Calon
- Roberto Carnevale
- Tristram Cary
- Kim Cascone
- Lawrence Chandler
- Unsuk Chin
- Michel Chion
- John Chowning
- Darren Copeland
- Micheline Coulombe Saint-Marcoux
- Noah Creshevsky
- Yves Daoust
- Mario Davidovsky
- Dan Deacon
- Michel Decoust
- Delia Derbyshire
- Marcelle Deschênes
- Francis Dhomont
- Vladimir Djambazov
- Tod Dockstader
- Charles Dodge
- Paul Dolden
- Louis Dufort
- Denis Dufour
- Chantal Dumas
- Kyle Bobby Dunn
- John Eaton
- Herbert Eimert
- Halim El-Dabh
- Jean-Claude Éloy
- Simon Emmerson
- Brian Eno
- Peter Eötvös
- Robert Erickson
- eRikm
- Luc Ferrari
- Carlo Forlivesi
- Eloy Fritsch
- Johannes Fritsch

== G–H ==
- Kenneth Gaburo
- Bernhard Gál
- Lucio Garau
- Roberto García
- Rolf Gehlhaar
- Roberto Gerhard
- Jacob Gilboa
- Gilles Gobeil
- Lucien Goethals
- Karel Goeyvaerts
- Jonty Harrison
- Jonathan Harvey
- Pierre Henry
- Lejaren Hiller
- Brian Hodgson
- York Höller
- Nicolaus A. Huber

== I–J ==
- Michał Jacaszek
- Alden Jenks
- David C. Johnson
- Ben Johnston
- David Evan Jones
- Elsa Justel

== K–L ==
- Shigeru Kan-no
- Zbigniew Karkowski
- Richard Karpen
- Georg Katzer
- Dieter Kaufmann
- Volkmar Klien
- Gottfried Michael Koenig
- Panayiotis Kokoras
- Włodzimierz Kotoński
- Ernst Krenek
- Petri Kuljuntausta
- Erkki Kurenniemi
- Leigh Landy
- Paul Lansky
- Andrew Lewis
- György Ligeti
- Douglas Lilburn
- Elainie Lillios
- Magnus Lindberg
- Francisco López
- Alvin Lucier
- Otto Luening

== M ==
- François-Bernard Mâche
- Robin Maconie
- Bruno Maderna
- Mesías Maiguashca
- Maki
- Pierre Mariétan
- Jean-Etienne Marie
- Pierre Mariétan
- Salvatore Martirano
- Elio Martusciello
- Toshiro Mayuzumi
- Peter McGarr
- John McGuire
- Barton McLean
- Priscilla McLean
- Olivier Messiaen
- Costin Miereanu
- Ilhan Mimaroglu
- Adrian Moore
- Robert Morris
- Nico Muhly
- Gordon Mumma

== N–Q ==
- Stephen Nachmanovitch
- Steven Naylor
- Phill Niblock
- Luigi Nono
- Arne Nordheim
- Robert Normandeau
- Giorgio Nottoli
- Emmanuel Nunes
- Erik Nyström
- Michael Obst
- Gonzalo de Olavide
- Pauline Oliveros
- Marco Oppedisano
- John Oswald
- Daphne Oram
- Elizabeth Parker
- Bernard Parmegiani
- Åke Parmerud
- Jorge Peixinho
- Michel Philippot
- Larry Polansky
- Zoltán Pongrácz
- Henri Pousseur

== R–S ==
- Eliane Radigue
- Guy Reibel
- Steve Reich
- Roger Reynolds
- Jean-Claude Risset
- Curtis Roads
- Manuel Rocha Iturbide
- Neil Rolnick
- David Rosenboom
- Stéphane Roy
- Pierre Schaeffer
- Raymond Scott
- Ramon Sender
- Elzbieta Sikora
- Denis Smalley
- Roger Smalley
- Tim Souster
- Laurie Spiegel
- Georgia Spiropoulos
- Nikos Stavropoulos
- Howard Stelzer
- Karlheinz Stockhausen
- Pete Stollery
- Carl Stone
- Allen Strange
- Dinesh Subasinghe
- Morton Subotnick
- Zsigmond Szathmáry

== T–U ==
- Yūji Takahashi
- Toru Takemitsu
- Ivan Tcherepnin
- Serge Tcherepnin
- James Tenney
- Robert Scott Thompson
- Javier Torres Maldonado
- Jacques Tremblay
- Gilles Tremblay
- Marc Tremblay
- Pierre Alexandre Tremblay
- Barry Truax
- Hans Tutschku
- Vladimir Ussachevsky

== V–Z ==
- Horacio Vaggione
- Annette Vande Gorne
- Edgar Varèse
- Alejandro Vinao
- Ezequiel Viñao
- Claude Vivier
- Robert Voisey
- Dimitri Voudouris
- Hildegard Westerkamp
- Oscar Wiggli
- Trevor Wishart
- Ed Wright (composer)
- Charles Wuorinen
- Iannis Xenakis
- Yehuda Yannay
- John Young
- La Monte Young
- Joji Yuasa
- Edson Zampronha
- Christian Zanési
- Richard Zarou
- Hans Zender
- Pavel Zhagun
