= Åke Parmerud =

Swedish composer

Åke Parmerud (born 24 July 1953) is a Swedish composer, musician, and multimedia artist noted for his acoustic and electronic works, which have been performed mostly in Europe, Mexico, and Canada. He is also noted for the design of stage and acoustics as well as interactive media and software. He has received recognition for his work from a number of festivals in Europe and has won two Swedish Grammis awards. He has been a member of the Royal Swedish Academy of Music since 1998.

== Biography ==
=== Education ===
Parmerud was born in Lidköping, Sweden. After working as a photographer from 1972 to 1974, Parmerud began his music studies in 1978 at the Högskolan för Scen och Musik (Conservatory of Theatre and Music) at the University of Gothenburg, where his teachers included the electronic-music composer and visual artist Rune Lindblad. He also studied with electronic-music pioneer Lars Gunnar Bodin Electronic Music Studio (EMS) in Stockholm (Peterson 2001; Parmerud n.d.).

=== Career ===
Parmerud has been active since the 1970s in music (instrumental and electro-acoustic), multimedia and interactive art and music for videos, dance and cinema (Anon. 2011a). He has been commissioned to write works for institutions in Sweden, Canada, the Netherlands, France, Germany, Norway and Denmark. His music represented Swedish radio at the Prix Italia on two occasions and was nominated for the Grand Nordic Music Prize (Parmerud n.d.; Anon. 2011b).

As a stage performer, Parmerud does electro-acoustic music alone or with other artists, mostly in Europe, Mexico, and Canada (Parmerud n.d.). His performances includes music, video, and performance, with his narratives often ending without a conclusion, leaving that up to the audience (Anon 2011a; Parmerud n.d.). During the late 1980s and 1990s he worked extensively together with composer Anders Blomqvist, with whom he wrote the music for a two-hour documentary on Greta Garbo, which in turn produced Strings and Shadows, in which the harp's sounds are transformed electronically (Peterson 2001). Their live performances, sometimes including fireworks, toured several countries in Europe (Parmerud n.d.; Anon. 2011b)

Appearances in Mexico include participation in the Visiones Sonores event in Morelia in 2010 to present “Hyperspace, a presentation of new 3D sound software” and a composition called “Crystal Counterpoint.” He presented a sound installation piece called “BlowUp” Mexico City,commissioned by Espacio de Experimentación Sonora of the Museo Universitario de Arte Contempóraneo (Anon. 2010a; Anon. 2010b). His most recent performance in Mexico is at the Festival Internacional Cervantino in Guanajuato in 2011 (Anon. 2011a).

Parmerud has had some performances in the United States. In 1997, “Grains of Voices” was performed on United Nations Day at the organization's New York headquarters (Parmerud n.d.; Anon. 2011b). At the Other Minds Festival he performed a piece called "La vie mécanique" ("The Mechanical Life") generated entirely from machine sounds.

For the last decade, Parmerud has been dedicated to acoustic design, designing facilities in Berlin, Paris, Mexico City and Reykjavík (Anon. 2011a). He has designed concerts and has been the artistic director of large indoor and outdoor audio-visual events (Parmerud n.d.; Anon. 2011b). He founded AudioTechture with Olle Niklasson, a company which specializes in acoustic interior design from homes to public spaces. He has worked as a sound and software designer for interactive audio-visual installations. Works such as “The Fire Inside,” “The Living Room” and “Lost Angel” have been shown in Berlin, Paris, Mexico City, Leon, Gothenburg and Reykjavík (Anon. 2011b). From 1999 to 2006, he worked with the Danish group Boxiganga to develop new interactive video installations and stage design. From 2000 to 2002, he worked with Canadian choreographer Pierre-Paul Savoi composing as well as designing software and sound. A work called the “Seventh Sense” was developed with Canadian choreographer Mireille Leblanc (Parmerud n.d.; Anon. 2011b).

== Musical style ==
Although he has written instrumental and multimedia music, he is most noted for his electro-acoustic music, which often combines tapes with instruments or voices. This characteristically results in processes of interaction and transformation between the different sound sources, as well as within one voice, instrument, or chord. Examples include Remain, for orchestra and tape, Alias (based on vocal sounds and quotations from John Dowland and Carlo Gesualdo), and Retur, for saxophone quartet and tape (Peterson 2001).

One of his works, called Grains of Voices, is based on recordings made in various parts of the world, examining the human voice in various states. The texts of its various sections are based on the Biblical Creation story, nursery rhymes, prayers, and poems (Peterson 2001). This includes indigenous chants, opera, protests, improvisation, prayer and recordings from television, radio and other media, as well as poetry from Hemingway, Hesse, and Joyce. It focuses on language, the role of voice, and how it relates to music. The piece was first performed live at the United Nations headquarters due to its international nature (Anon 2011a).

== Honours ==
Parmerud is one of Sweden's best-known musicians outside of the country. His first major recognition was in 1978 when his piece “Proximities” received first prize at the international music festival in Bourges, France, since then receiving twelve more from the same festival (Anon. 2011b). He has received honors from the Prix Ars Electronica in Linz, Austria, Metamorfosis in Belgium, Electronic Arts Award in Sweden, Noroit Prize in France, and the ICMA Prize for Composition. More recent awards include the Gigahertz Preis in Germany in 2008 and the Qwartz Pierre Shaeffer Prize in France in 2009 (Anon. 2011b). He has received two Swedish Grammis awards for best classical album of the year (Parmerud n.d.; Anon. 2011b). He has been a member of The Swedish Royal Academy of Music since 1998 (Parmerud n.d.).

== Recordings ==
His work has been issued on two vinyl albums and two CDs, appearing on many more as a contributor (Anon. 2011b).

- Bruit noir (empreintes DIGITALes, IMED 22179, 2022)
- Nécropolis (empreintes DIGITALes, IMED 16137, 2016)
- Growl (empreintes DIGITALes, IMED 15132, 2015)
- Jeu d'ombres (empreintes DIGITALes, IMED 0367, 2003)
- Grains of Voices (Caprice, CAP 21579, 1996)
- Osynlig Musik / Invisible Music / Musique invisible (Phono Suecia, PSCD 72, 1994)
- Maze; Yàn (Caprice, CAP 1320, 1987)
- Yttringar (Ton Art, TONART 17, 1984)

== List of works ==
- Alias, for tape (1990)
- Bows, Arcs and The Arrow of Time (2004), string orchestra, computer, and video
- Coda (1984)
- Cut 1, 2, 3 Progress (1996)
- Dreaming in Darkness (2005), 6-track tape
- Efterbild (1997–98), orchestra, and computer
- L'espace qui vous regarde (2001), audiovisual installation
- Éxor (1986), piano
- The Fire Inside (2000), audiovisual installation
- Floden av Glas (The River of Glass) (1978–81), incidental music
- Les flûtes en feu (1999)
- Genom landskap av glas (1976)
- Grains of Voices (1994–95)
- The Heart of Silence (1997–98), multimedia (choir, electroacoustic tape, photography, and dance)
- Inori (1987), harpsichord, and synthesizer
- Inside Looking Out (1992), ensemble instrumental, ordinateur et bande
- Intermediate I (1994)
- Intermediate II (1994)
- Intermediate III (1994)
- Intermediate IV (1994)
- Isola (1985–86), chamber orchestra, and tape
- Jeux imaginaires (1993)
- Krén (1983)
- Lost Angel (2004), interactive audiovisual installation, and dance performance
- Mandala (1983)
- Maze (1985–86)
- Mirage (1995–96), chamber ensemble, and tape
- Närheter (från igår och natten) (1978), text-sound
- Les objets obscurs (1991)
- Out of Sight (1981)
- Phoenix I (1997)
- Prolog (1981)
- Proximities (1978)
- Reed my Lips (1990), wind quintet, and tape
- Remain (1980), orchestra, and tape
- Renaissance (1994)
- Repulse (1986)
- Retur (1992–93), saxophone quartet, and tape
- Rit (1981)
- Ritual Melodies (1990)
- Strata: mémoires d'un amoureux (2001), music for the choreography by Pierre-Paul Savoie
- Stringquartett (1988)
- Strings & Shadows (1993), harp, and tape
- SubString Bridge (1999), guitar, and interactive computer
- Tangent (1989)
- Tide In (2001), two singers, and motion tracking system
- Time's Imaginary Eye (1979), soprano, and tape (with slides)
- La vie mécanique (2004)
- Yàn (1985), percussion ensemble, and tape
- Yttringar (1983), soprano, cello, trombone, piano, 3 percussions, and tape
- Zeit aus Zeit (The Stockhausen Variations) (2001–02), piano, percussion, and live electronics
