= Ascione =

Ascione may refer to:

== People ==
- Aniello Ascione (fl 1680 –1708), Italian painter of still lifes
- Joe Ascione (1961–2016), American jazz drummer
- Patrick Ascione (1953-2014), French composer of electroacoustic and acousmatic music
- Thierry Ascione (born 1981), retired French tour male tennis player

== Other uses ==
- asteroid 17972 Ascione
- Ascione Company Museum
