= Many Many Voices =

Live album by Roberto Paci Dalò, Isabella Bordoni
- Released: November 1995
- Recorded: January 1995
- Venue: Haus der Kulturen der Welt
- Genre: Electronic, Radio music, Experimental
- Label: The Listening Room - Edel
- Producer: Caterina Pilati, Heidi Grundmann, José Iges, Manfred Mixner, Pekka Ruohranta

Roberto Paci Dalò, Isabella Bordoni chronology
Ars Acustica International - EBU Selection 1994 (1995)	Many Many Voices (1995)	Horizontal Radio (1996)

Many Many Voices is a live hörspiel by Roberto Paci Dalò and Isabella Bordoni, broadcast from the Haus der Kulturen der Welt, Berlin, on January 29, 1995. Produced for Sender Freies Berlin, Kunstradio, RNE, YLE, Giardini Pensili.

== Reception ==
Show radiofonico del gennaio 1995 che offre un ampio spettro degli interessi e della poetica di Paci Dalò. [...] La musica scorre tra rock, avanguardia e ameublement, non curandosi di ridursi a colonna sonora.

-Giampiero Cane, Il Manifesto 9.1.1998

In MANY MANY VOICES wird die Fiktion eines gelebten kommmunikativen und kreativen Neben- und Miteinanders, eines Babylons, in dem es trotz Vielsprachigkeit keine Verständigungsbarrieren gibt, für kurze Zeit Wirklichkeit.

-Kunstradio 9.2.1995

== Track listing ==
All songs written and directed by Roberto Paci Dalò and Isabella Bordoni.

No.	Title	Length
1.	"Achtung! Achtung!"	1:00
2.	"The Rapper Bopper"	3:36
3.	"Croatia. Croatia"	2:58
4.	"Many Many Feet"	3:29
5.	"Ein Guitar Monolog"	2:29
6.	"Braket Gospel"	3:00
7.	"Kambis' Story"	3:09
8.	"Ali Baba"	1:10
9.	"My Language Is My Heimat"	2:43
10.	"Until The End Of The War"	3:46
11.	"A Little Song"	0:57
12.	"L'Orlando Innamorato"	4:47
13.	"Russian Tale"	1:58
14.	"Scratch My Soul"	304
15.	"Beati I Semplici"	4:11
16.	"Aurora's Song"	7:44
17.	"In The Bar"	2:17
18.	"Senza Titolo"	3:21
19.	"The Mathematician"	3:57

== Personnel ==
- Roberto Paci Dalò - composer, conductor, sampler, clarinet, voice, electronics
- David Moss - percussion, voice
- Isabella Bordoni - dramaturgy, voice
- Anna Clementi - voice
- Jean-Marc Montera - electric guitar, voice
- Horst Hörtner - electronics & system design, artistical collaboration
- Claudio Jacomucci - accordion
- Susanne Burkhardt - assistant direction
- Patrizio Esposito - artistical collaboration
- Isabella Bordoni, Roberto Paci Dalò - liner notes
- Sabine Breitsameter - dramaturgy consultant
- Oreste Zevola - illustration, drawings
- K-PLEX Berlin - design
