= Japanese Girls at the Harbor =

Japanese Girls at the Harbor may refer to:

- Japanese Girls at the Harbor (film), a 1933 Japanese silent film by Hiroshi Shimizu
- Japanese Girls at the Harbor (album), a 2012 music album by Roberto Paci Dalò and Yasuhiro Morinaga
