= Martusciello =

Martusciello is an Italian surname. Notable people with the surname include:

- Elio Martusciello (born 1959), Italian experimental music composer and performer
- Fulvio Martusciello (born 1968), Italian politician
- Giovanni Martusciello (born 1971), Italian association football coach and former player
