= 1915 The Armenian Files =

Live album by Roberto Paci Dalò
- Released: 11 December 2015
- Recorded: May 3, 2015
- Venue: ORF Funkhaus Studio RP4
- Genre: Electronic, Experimental
- Label: Marsèll Records

Roberto Paci Dalò chronology
Ye Shanghai (2014)	1915 The Armenian Files (2015)	Long Night Talks (2020)

1915 The Armenian Files is an album by Roberto Paci Dalò, released in 2015 by Marsèll Records in collaboration with Giardini Pensili, Arthub (Shanghai/Hong Kong) and the Embassy of Armenia in Italy. It was recorded live in Vienna at the digital studio of the ORF (Austrian National Broadcasting Corporation) for the programme Kunstradio.

== Background ==
1915 The Armenian Files is conceived about the Armenian genocide. Among the sound of the music, Daniel Varoujan's poems are narrated by Boghos Levon Zekiyan, also appearing the voice of the composer, religious and musicologist Komitas Vardapet. The record comes together with a movie, an exhibition, a radio broadcast, a multimedia concert.

== Reception ==
Professional ratings
Review scores
Source	Rating
Sentireascoltare	7.2/10

The magazine Artribune places the album among the 25 best records of 2015. According to the magazine Neural, "in 1915 The Armenian Files a passionate and involved narrative is modulated by multiple influences and linkages, in an ultra-vivid junction of acoustic-electronic dramaturgy and immersive sensory perception".

quanto si ascolta è l’ennesima conferma della sensibilità di un musicista poco appariscente nelle cronache mondane, ma di grandissima sostanza.

-Fabrizio Zampighi, Sentireascoltare 10.01.2016

un'opera bellissima – tanto sonora quanto poetica

-Lello Voce, Il Fatto Quotidiano 28.06.2016.

== Track listing ==
No.	Title	Length
1.	"Mirk"	1:10
2.	"Sirt"	0:59
3.	"Sirel"	4:27
4.	"Grag"	2:19
5.	"Arak"	5:02
6.	"Nairy"	3:35
7.	"Gaydz"	4:02
8.	"Hosank"	1:41
9.	"Sharjum"	2:26
10.	"Vorodoum"	2:21
11.	"Garmir"	3:01
12.	"Anabad"	4:12
13.	"Dalovian"	1:36
14.	"Alpaghian"	6:05

== Personnel ==
- Roberto Paci Dalò – composition, clarinets, live electronics
- Boghos Levon Zekiyan – narration (recorded in 2000)
- Stefano Spada / Light Parade – beat design
- Julia Kent – cello
- Fabrizio Modonese Palumbo – electric guitar
- Daniel Varoujan – texts

== Credits ==
- Sound Engineers: Elmar Peinelt, Markus Radinger
- ORF Kunstradio Producer: Elisabeth Zimmermann
- Mastered at La Maestà studio by Giovanni Versari
- Julia Kent and Fabrizio Modonese Palumbo recorded at O.F.F. Studio in Turin, sound engineer: Paul Beauchamp
- Produced by Roberto Paci Dalò and Mirko Rizzi
- Production Marsèll, Giardini Pensili, Arthub, Ambasciata della Repubblica d'Armenia in Italia
