= Elio Martusciello =

Italian experimental music composer and performer

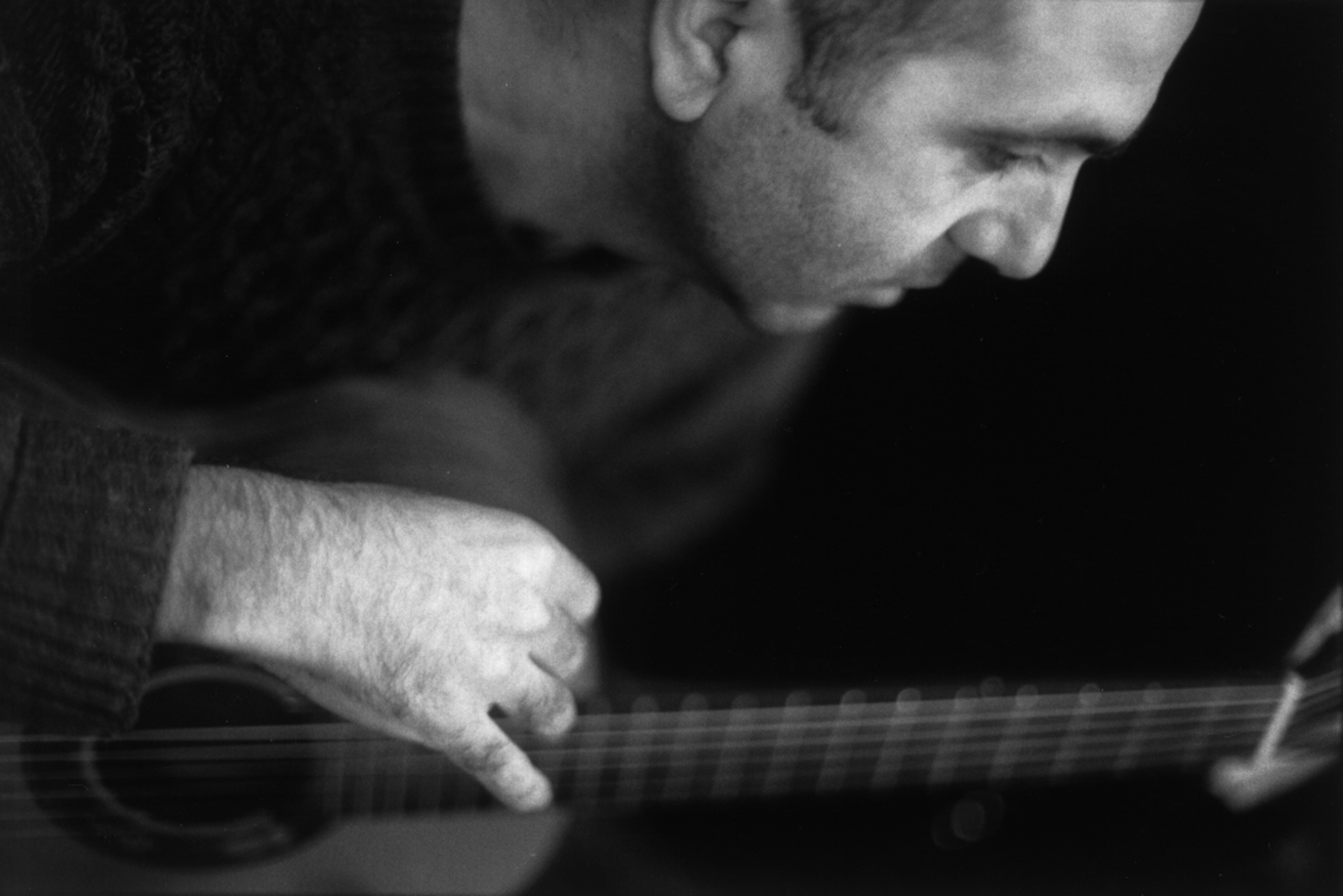

Background information
- Born: 23 November 1959 (age 66); Naples, Italy
- Genres: Experimental, Electroacoustic, Electronic, Free improvisation
- Instruments: Computer, guitar
- Years active: 1978–present
- Website: Home page

Elio Martusciello (born 23 November 1959) is an Italian experimental music composer and performer, principally on guitar and computer. He has studied photography with Mimmo Jodice and visual art with Carlo Alfano, Armando De Stefano and Rosa Panaro. He is a self-taught musician/composer and teaches "electronic music" at Conservatory of Music, Naples, Italy. His compositional aesthetics are derived from acousmatic issues, but in addition to acousmatic composition he composes for instruments and live electronics, sound installation, multi-media works, audiovisual art and computer music improvisation. He lives in Naples.

== Main collaborations ==
He has worked with improvising musicians such as Ana-Maria Avram, Natasha Barrett, Eugene Chadbourne, Alvin Curran, Chris Cutler, Iancu Dumitrescu, Michel Godard, Tim Hodgkinson, Thomas Lehn, Lawrence D. "Butch" Morris, Jerome Noetinger, Tony Oxley, Roberto Paci Dalo, Evan Parker, Giancarlo Schiaffini, Mario Schiano, Z'EV, and others.

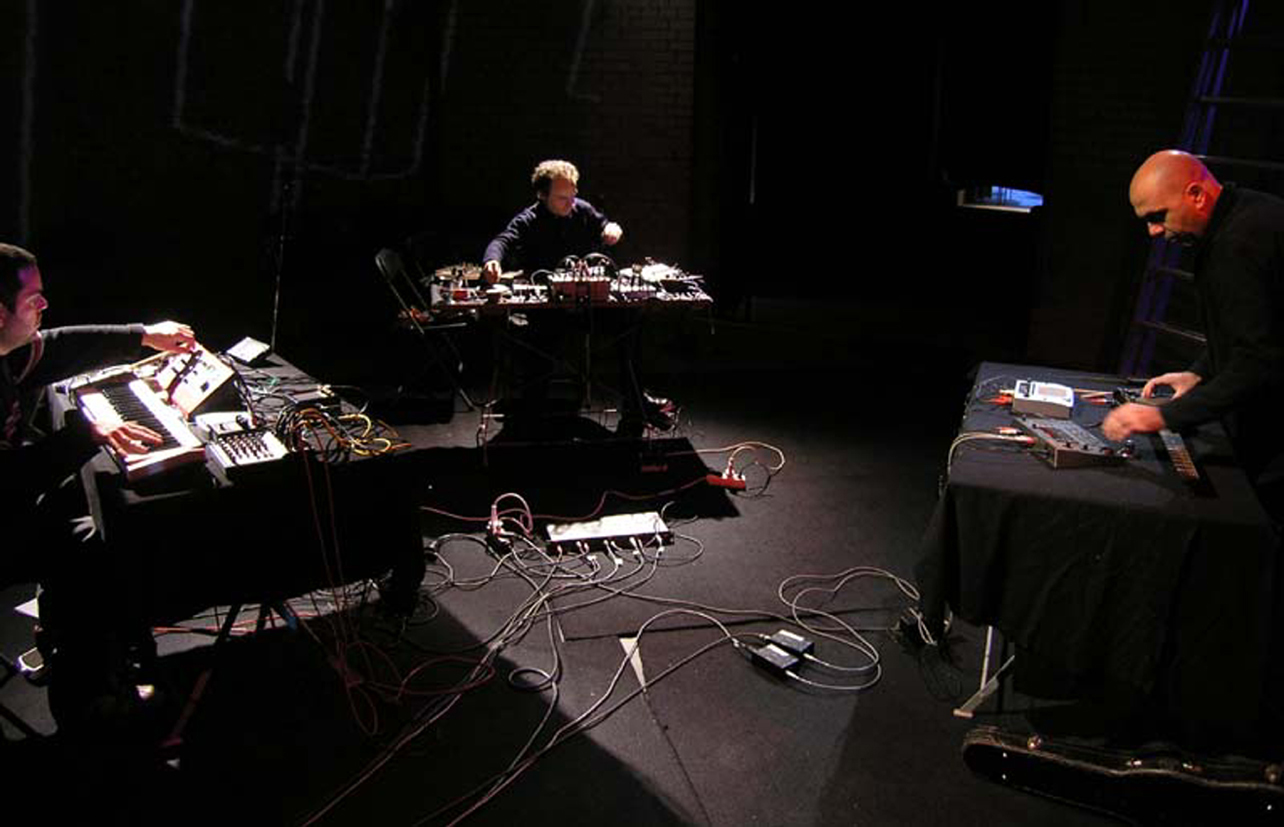
Ossatura, Berlin 2003

== Bands ==
Ossatura
with Fabrizio Spera and Luca Venitucci
Ka’e
with Giorgio Bosso, Stefano Giampietro, Paolo Montella and Andrea Laudante
Schismophonia
with Mike Cooper
Taxonomy
with Graziano Lella and Roberto Fega
Bindou ensemble
with Ana-Maria Avram, Chris Cutler, Rhodri Davies, Iancu Dumitrescu and Tim Hodgkinson
Le pecore di Dante
with Tim Hodgkinson
DA
with Paganmuzak
Xubuxue
with Pietro D'Agostino, Marco Ariano and Gianfranco Tedeschi

== Selected discography and videography ==
E. e M. Martusciello: meta-harmonies (Staalplaat, 1995)
Ossatura: dentro (Recommended Records, 1998)
Ossatura: verso (Recommended Records, 2002)
Aesthetics of the machine (bowindo, 2003)
Unoccupied areas (Recommended Records, 2005)
Taxonomy: A Global Taxonomycal Machine (Ambiances Magnétiques, 2005)
Taxonomy: 10 Taxonomical Movements (Ambiances Magnétiques, 2008)
To extend the visibility (Recommended Records, 2009)
Concrete songs (TiConZero, 2011)
BetweenUs: Chamber Rites (Die Schachtel, 2015)
Ossatura: Maps and Mazes (Recommended Records, 2016)
incise (em music, 2018)
The Ghost Album (em music, 2020)
SISMONASTIE - Music for yellow guitar solo (em music, 2023)
Esercizi per esistere (Dissipatio records, 2024)
AKOUSMA-MOTHER (em music, 2024)

== See also ==
- List of acousmatic-music composers
- Electroacoustic music
- Acousmatic music
- Sound installation
- List of free improvising musicians and groups
- Sound art
- Musique concrète
- List of experimental musicians
