= Ye Shanghai =

Live album by Roberto Paci Dalò
- Released: November 2014
- Recorded: January 13th 2013
- Venue: ORF Funkhaus Studio RP4, Wien
- Genre: Electronic
- Length: 61:00
- Label: Marsèll Records
- Producer: Roberto Paci Dalò, Mirko Rizzi, Davide Quadrio, Francesca Girelli

Roberto Paci Dalò chronology
Japanese Girls at the Harbor (2012)	Ye Shanghai (2014)	1915 The Armenian Files (2015)

Ye Shanghai (Chinese: 夜上海) is a live album by artist Roberto Paci Dalò, recorded as a live 5.1 performance in ORF Funkhaus Studio, Austrian Broadcasting Corporation in Wien, for Kunstradio programme and distributed by Soundohm. Beneath the album, the homonym project related to the history of the Shanghai Ghetto.

== Background ==
Sonic materials are the Chinese song of the 30s Ye Shanghai (Shanghai nights) played by Zhou Xuan, sampled and rebuilt, and samples from archive materials from the years between 1933 and 1949, voices in English, Yiddish, Chinese, German. To these, live instrumental and electronic sounds. The album was presented in Venice on 10 November 2014 at the Bevilacqua La Masa Foundation.

== Reception ==
Nessun tentativo di turismo colonial-musicale, piuttosto il voler attingere dalle fonti extraeuropee per realizzare un arazzo sonoro senza tempo, dove tecnologia e suoni dalla vita reale si fondono in un continuum di grande fascino sonoro.

-Carlo Boccadoro, Internazionale 06.01.2015

This complex and poignant sound collage is comprised of recorded voices that quickly dissolve into ambient electronic sound that grows increasingly in intensity over the course of this reflective piece.

-Clocktower Radio NY

This work is packed with history, knowledge and emotion…so much emotion that it brought a friend to tears. The music accompanying the imagery was infectious, meditative, transitory, crawling into my psyche…repetitious beats reinforced the clarity of the images, their power and resonance.

-Rachel Marsden, Rachel Marsden's Words blog 14.09.2012

Ye Shanghai è molto più di un disco. È una ricerca innovativa in cui l’artista indaga l’incredibile storia di questo Ghetto.

-Lorenza Ghinelli, Carmilla 23.01.2015

Ye Shanghai è musica contemporanea che non ha nulla da invidiare alle soluzioni di Brian Eno. Il clarinetto suona su loop rubati ad una famosa canzone cinese “Ye Shanghai” del 1937 che la scompongono fino a rendere impossibile il suo riconoscimento. L’opera diventa così un unico lunghissimo brano di un’ora che si sviluppa con suggestioni stratificate.

-Stefania Mazzotti, gagarin orbite culturali 31.01.2015

== Track listing ==
No.	Title	Length
1.	"Ye Shanghai"	61:00

== Personnel ==
- Bass clarinet, sampler & electronics - Roberto Paci Dalò
- Sound Engineers - Elmart Peinelt, Suzanne Wirtitsch
- Kunstradio Producer - Elisabeth Zimmermann
- Design: Roberto Paci Dalò

== Credits ==
- Mastered at Farmhouse Studio Rimini by Andrea Felli
- First performance: September 6, 2012, SH Contemporary - Shanghai Contemporary Art Fair; commissioned by Massimo Torrigiani
- First broadcasting: January 13, 2013, ORF Kunstradio, Vienna
- Published by L’Arte dell’Ascolto
- Production: Marsèll Records, Arthub, Giardini Pensili

Marsèll Records, Marsèll001
