= Sparks (Roberto Paci Dalò album) =

Studio album / live album by Roberto Paci Dalò
- Released: 1 October 2007
- Recorded: 1995, 1996, 2002
- Venue: Phonurgia Nova festival
- Studio: Centro di Produzione Radio Rai; Velvet Factory
- Genre: Experimental
- Label: Horus/21st
- Producer: Roberto Paci Dalò

Roberto Paci Dalò chronology
| WITZ FM (2006) | Sparks (2007) | Alluro (2010) |

Sparks is an album produced for the occasion of Roberto Paci Dalò's solo exhibition Sparks at the Palazzo delle Papesse, and presented during the opening on 6 October 2007. It is the third release by 21st Records discography series founded by the Sienese centre and the label Horus Music.

== Background ==
The project is named after the word sparks once used to define marconimen, marconists or radiotelegraphists, in the early years of the XX century. It's a tribute to the pioneers of radio transmission in the Morse code era. About the album, some materials are completely acoustic from recordings made within a ten-year time frame. 1 to 3, 5, 6, 8, are tracks once made in 1995 as part of the Rai program Audiobox. Shpil and Sparks recorded live at the Phonurgia Nova Festival in Arles, 1996. EMN40 as a multi-channel audio/video installation for the Ensemble Musique Nouvelles 40th anniversary, Bruxelles 2002. Yiddish lyrics of Gospel written by Chaim Tauber.

== Reception ==
«Sparks», come i marconimen che a inizio Novecento occupavano sulle navi i posti radio. Ed è nato in radio, essenzialmente, questo disco straordinario, nei benemeriti studi Rai di Audiobox nel 1995. Rimuginati per oltre dieci anni, contaminati da esperienze successive, questi materiali sonori ritornano ora in cd, in un oggetto sedimentato e coerente, dove la sperimentazione colta va a braccetto con la musica popolare mitteleuropea e inediti incroci etnici. Il clarinetto e i samples di Paci Dalò, in un’atmosfera ambient acustica, invitano alla danza voci e strumenti – tra i quali, ricordiamo, il violoncello del compianto Tom Cora.

- Enzo Mansueto, Rodeo Magazine n°44 febbraio 2008

The instruments make their work, they don’t speak and they don’t elude each other, they neither stutter or mimic sounds they could have been. The melodic lines cross and intersect, sometimes they accomplice each other and some others they follow different tracks, and then they meet again, they turn or launch themselves in sudden unisons

- Pino Saulo

I enjoyed your music very much and wish you great success in your future projects.

- John Zorn

== Track listing ==
| No. | Title | Length |
|---|---|---|
| 1. | "Mizrach" | 9:34 |
| 2. | "Thoreau" | 6:25 |
| 3. | "Gospel" | 7:11 |
| 4. | "EMN40" | 13:56 |
| 5. | "Balàila" | 4:30 |
| 6. | "Interludio" | 0:58 |
| 7. | "Shpil" | 2:42 |
| 8. | "L'Internazionale di Dalò" | 5:23 |
| 9. | "Sparks" | 4:02 |

== Personnel ==
- Accordion – Claudio Jacomucci
- Cello – Tom Cora
- Clarinet, Bass Clarinet, Voice, Sampler, Composed By, Producer, Mastered By – Roberto Paci Dalò
- Drums – Fabrizio Spera
- Electric Guitar – Jean-Marc Montera
- Violin, Narrator [Japanese Narration] – Takumi Fukushima
- Engineer – Claudio Baldasseroni (tracks: 1 to 3, 5, 6, 8)
- Mastered By [Assistant] – Andrea Felli
- Photography By [Rimini Old Harbour] – Roberto Paci Dalò
- Photography By [Stalingrad Polaroid] – Patrizio Esposito
- Design – Michela Bracciali
