= Japanese Girls at the Harbor (album) =

Studio album by Yasuhiro Morinaga Roberto Paci Dalò
- Released: April 15, 2012
- Recorded: 2012
- Studio: Concrete Studio, Tokyo
- Length: 47:08
- Producer: Concrete and Giardini Pensili

Yasuhiro Morinaga Roberto Paci Dalò chronology
The Maya Effect (2011)	Japanese Girls at the Harbor (2012)	Ye Shanghai (2014)

Japanese Girls at the Harbor is a collaborative studio album between Roberto Paci Dalò and Yasuhiro Morinaga produced at Concrete Studio in Tokyo. It is the sonorization for the Japanese silent film Japanese Girls at the Harbor directed by Hiroshi Shimizu in 1933. Some of the sounds used for the project are recorded in the original shooting location at the port of Yokohama.

== Background ==
The album is the first work of a project named after expression Soundograph, works to explore and create relations between silent cinema and sonic research.

== Reception ==
According to Concrete, "Morinaga and Paci Dalo’s new soundtrack for the film creates alternative narrative structures through a complex layering of noise, voices, drones, environmental, instrumental, and electronic sounds."

== Track listing ==
No.	Title	Length
1.	"Scene1"	16:09
2.	"Scene2"	13:26
3.	"Scene3"	13:46
4.	"Scene4"	5:40

== Personnel ==
- Composed, performed, and produced by Yasuhiro Morinaga and Roberto Paci Dalo
- Field Recording by Yasuhiro Morinaga + Naoki Kato
- Design by Roberto Paci Dalo and Eriko Sonoda
- Feedback Drone: Naoki Kato
- Project Manager: Azusa Yamazaki
