= Rune Lindblad =

Swedish composer and artist (1923–1991)

Rune Lindblad (12 May 1923, in Gothenburg – 5 May 1991) was a Swedish composer of musique concrète and electronic music, and visual artist.

== Career ==
He first began composing in 1953 and composed over 200 works.

His first piece, "Party", is considered the first electroacoustic work created in Sweden.

For three years he experimented with optics and sound, and produced five works using over 1800 meters of film.

On 14 February 1957, Lindblad, Sven-Eric Johansson, and Bruno Epstein put on the first concert of concrète and electronic music in Sweden at the Folkets hus in Gothenburg. The audience responded poorly and demanded refunds, critics referred to the music as "pure torture".

As a visual artist, he created paintings, drawings, etchings, collages, woodcuts, etc. Some of which adorn his albums.

Lindblad taught at University of Gothenburg, his students included Rolf Enström, Åke Parmerud, and Ulf Bilting.

== Discography ==
- Predestination (1975), Proprius
- Rune Lindblad (1988), Radium 226.05
- Death of the Moon and Other Early Works (1989), Pogus Productions
- Death of the Moon: Electronic & Concrète Music (1953-1960) (1997), Pogus – reissue of earlier LP with additional material from Radium LP
- Objekt 2: Electronic & Concrète Music (1962-1988) (1998), Pogus – includes remaining material from Radium LP
- Die stille Liebe (2003) Elektron
