= Elsa Justel =

Argentine composer

Elsa Justel is an Argentine composer of instrumental and electroacoustic music, and video-artist.

== Biography ==
Justel was born on February 19, 1944, in Mar del Plata, Argentina. Justel begins her musical education in the conservatory of that city, where she had the degree of Professor of Music Education and Choral Conducting in 1969. During the 1970s and 1980s, she studied composition in Buenos Aires with Virtú Maragno and Electroacoustic music with José Maranzano. At this period she traveled to Spain and Germany, where she studied with Carmelo Bernaola and Jan Vriend. She moved to live and work in France long-term in 1988. She received a master's degree in electroacoustic music from the University of Paris in 1991. She later received a Doctorate in Esthetics, Sciences and Technologies of Arts at the Université de Paris VIII where she was supervised by Horacio Vaggione.

She has also taught at the Université Paris-Est Marne-la-Vallée, electroacoustic music at the Universitat Pompeu Fabra in Barcelona, and provided lectures at the University of California, Santa Barbara. She moved to live and work in France long-term in 1988. Her Doctoral Thesis was entitled Les structures formelles dans la musique électroacoustique. In 2007 she created the Destellos Foundation in Mar del Plata and has been the organizer of the Destellos Electroacoustic Music Composition Contest since 2008. Over her career her music was performed in Hong Kong, Canada, Germany, France, Denmark, Spain, and the UK. She has also completed commissioned works for the Government of France.

Justel uses both real sounds and virtual elements in her compositions. Her work has utilized a variety of sound creations, such as her work Fy Mor, which was created in 1991 using only the sounds of kitchen utensils. Deniz Peters described Justel's work as, "a sophisticated weaving of miniscule [sic] points of contact, in complex constellations of sonic imitations."

== Research ==
Justel's research in musicology is oriented to the aspects of Formal structure and space in Electroacoustic music; and towards the field of perception and physical parameters on image and sound. She also introduced new technical resources in her piece for harpsichord and electronics La ventana deshabitada.

== Recognition ==
Justel has been awarded the Prix Ars Electronica in Austria, Prix biennal Presque rien in France, and the Prix Ton Bruynèl in The Netherlands. She has been called “a pioneer” of electroacoustic music composition in Argentina.
