= Chantal Dumas =

Canadian sound artist

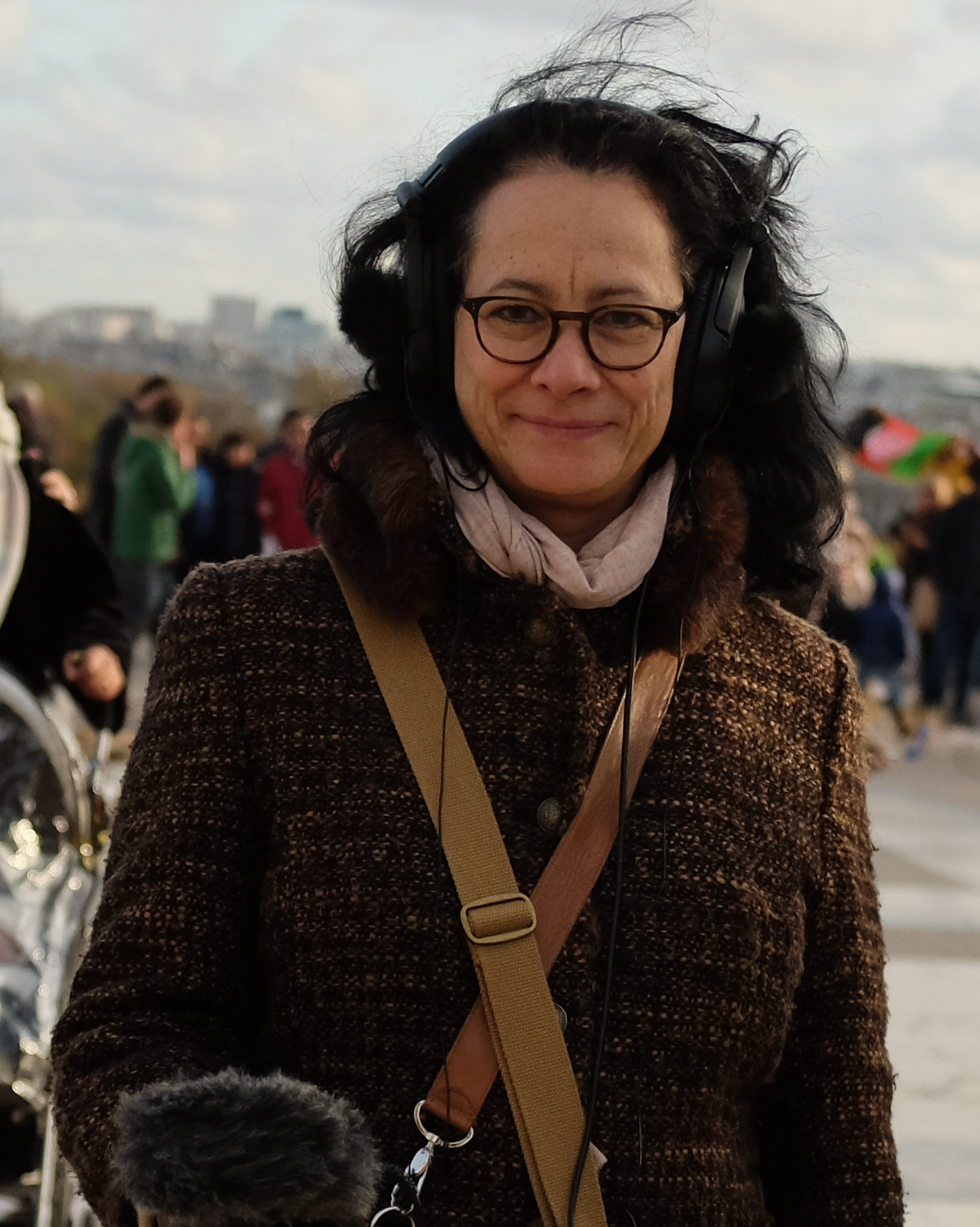
Chantal Dumas, a Sound Artist

Chantal Dumas (1959 - 2026) was a sound artist based in Montreal. She worked as a composer and improviser through the mediums of radio and sound installation.

== Discography ==
- Le parfum des femmes — Das Perfüme der Frauen (OHM / Avatar, AVTR 011, 2000)
- Radio Roadmovies with Christian Calon (326music, 326 006/007, 2003)
