= Isabella Bordoni =

Italian writer and artist

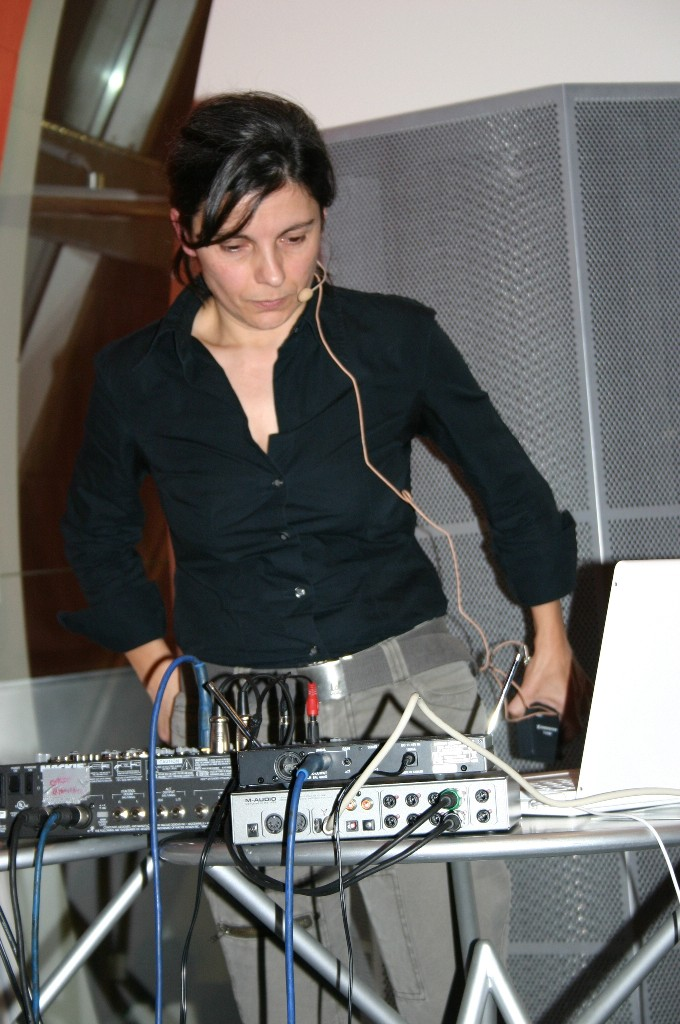
- Born: 1962 (age 63–64); Rimini, Italy
- Occupations: poet, artist
- Writing career
- Genres: lyric poetry, free verse, prose poem, new technologies, interactive art

Isabella Bordoni (born 1962 in Rimini, Italy) is an Italian poet, writer, visual and sound artist, performer and independent curator. Involved in the sphere of public art, with wide-ranging projects of urban dramaturgies and relational arts, from 2016 she is the curator of IMAGONIRMIA AWARD "variable displacement", an international prize for the art of the present.

== Early life and education ==
Isabella Bordoni was born in Rimini, and studied philosophy, literature, art and vocals with Gabriella Bartolomei in Florence.

== Work ==
Her work primarily focuses on themes of language, body, voice, crossing boundaries and adhering to the process of art as techné. Her artistic practice includes performance and electronic art. Since the mid-1980s she has been involved in dramaturgy for theatre and radio. Bordoni pays particular attention to the issue of urban narratives and memory in cities and urban outskirts, and in 2000 used the terms "poetryscapes" and "poetic citizenship" to describe her work. Interested in the "document" as a device of narrative construction and deconstruction, in 2014 she also started an awareness project around the photographic archive of Marco Caselli Nirmal called «Osservatorio critico/Archivio e Fondo fotografico d'autore».

=== Selected projects ===
- Lacrima (e vive), 2003, at Palazzo delle Papesse, Centro per l'arte contemporanea, Siena (I), a collaboration by Palazzo delle Papesse and Ars Electronica/Futurelab Linz, A.
- Digital Migration, 2005, at ArteSella 2005, site-specific installation for Malga Costa Bolgovalsugana, Tn (I), a collaboration by ArteSella, MART Rovereto, Forum Austriaco di Cultura.

Italy PALAZZO DELLE PAPESSE/Caveau – site-specific project "Lacrima ( e vive)" di Isabella Bordoni

- Refugee|Stati d'Esilio. Epifanie, 2011–14, is a long-term project about processes and practices of art, that criticize the concepts of homeland and citizenship. It includes an artist's book "Refugee|Archivio1", currently part of permanent artists books collection at the Bibliothèque Kandinsky at the Centre Pompidou, Paris, and at the International Poetry Centre in Marseille.
- Michel Butor. À propos de. Entre littérature et art, le paysage véritable with and about French writer Michel Butor, semiologist Paolo Fabbri and Silvia Riva, French studies and translator of Dominique Fourcade.
- Contro la Purezza (Against Purity), 2008–11, a long-term project based on archival research. A reflection on the tragedy as a historical and political legacy of the twentieth century and whether it is possible for art to take upon itself the task of elaborating it. Project theoretically influenced by Søren Kierkegaard, Arthur Schopenhauer, Friedrich Nietzsche, Ingeborg Bachmann, Hannah Arendt, and includes radio production, performance, and a symposium.
- Der Marsch der Einsamen, a piece for the radio, Kunstradio
- Le Partage (des Voix) from Jean-Luc Nancy text "Le Partage des voix"
- Luogo Eventuale from Ein Ort für Zufälle by Ingeborg Bachmann
- Libertà come bene supremo_ giornate di osservazione e critica del contemporaneo with filmmaker, essayist and activist Eyal Sivan, with anthropologist Marco Aime, and philosopher Giovanni Leghissa.

=== Poetry ===
- Excerpt from "Fortuna" published in Poesia, the international magazine of poetry

== Bibliography ==
- Literatur-Verein i:b, Andante con figure
- Kunstradio ORF Vienna
- In Women, Art and Technology, edited by Judy Malloy (MIT Press). 2001 by Anna Couey
- "Interviewing New Media Art Didactics" by Alessio Chierico
- "On Networked Collaborations at Ars Electronica 2002" by Nina Czegledy
- "Language is the first creative act" by Sabine Breitsameter, AudioHyperspace, March 2003
- Digimag, 29, November 2007, by Alessio Chierico
- "On Libertà come bene supremo" by Costanza Meli 2009
- "Isabella Bordoni. Interprète de la relation entre l'écriture, le corps et le paysage" by Costanza Meli 2013
- Chiamamicitta.net Refugee Stati D'esilio/ Epifanie (2011–14) – ARCHIVIO 1 by Lorella Barlaam
