= Pierre Mariétan =

Swiss composer (1935–2025)

Pierre Mariétan (23 September 1935 – 23 March 2025) was a Swiss composer.

== Biography ==
Born in Monthey, Mariétan studied first at the Geneva Conservatory in 1955–60 with Marescotti and later with, amongst others, Pierre Boulez, Bernd Alois Zimmermann, Gottfried Michael Koenig, Henri Pousseur, and Karlheinz Stockhausen, and his earliest works are squarely in the serialist camp. During the 1960s he began creating outline sketches for improvisation, and beginning in the 1970s became increasingly interested in environmental sound and the problem of noise pollution.

In 1966 he was a founder of the Groupe d'Etude et Réalisation Musicales (GERM), and in 1979 founded the Laboratoire Acoustique et Musique Urbaine de l'Ecole d'Architecture de Paris La Villette, which he directed until 1990. Mariétan taught at the University of Paris (I et VIII) from 1969 to 1988 and at the Ecole d'Architecture de Paris la Villette in 1993. He was Director of the Conservatoire de Garges (Région parisienne) 1972–77, and was also a visiting lecturer at the Universities of Paris, Lille, Barcelona, Tokyo, Kyoto, Osaka, University of California San Diego, the Ecole Hautes Etudes Sociales Paris, Ecoles Nationales Supérieures des Beaux-Arts et d'Architecture of Paris, Besançon, and Marseilles, and the École Polytechnique de Lausanne.

Mariétan died in Paris on 23 March 2025, at the age of 89.

== Musical style ==
While Mariétan's early work was primarily focussed on serialism, he turned in the 1960s to composing sketch-scores (some intended for amateurs and children) and guidelines for improvisation. Since the 1970s he mainly focussed on combining composed music ("music of the interior"), with everyday environmental sounds ("music of the exterior"), which led him to electronic and radiophonic composition. Paysmusique (1991), for example, combines 96 voices speaking in different Swiss dialects. He also created sound installations and sound environments, sometimes collaborating with architects.

== Compositions (selective list) ==
- Caractères, for flute, viola, and contrabass (1961)
- Ersatz, for solo viola (1961)
- Exposés I–II, for 21 instruments (1961)
- Passages I–III, for viola and cello (1961)
- Faces I–II, for 18 instruments (1961)
- Pièce centrale, for 21 instruments (1961)
- Récit suivi de légende, for soprano, flute, English horn, clarinet, horn, harp, piano, and viola (1963–66)
- Minutes, for chamber orchestra (1964)
- Tempéraments (1964–56/1969)
- Systèmes, for piano (1968)
- Quatemio I, for carillon (1970)
- Interfaces, for strings and tape (1971)
- Milieu et environnement, exécution simultanée de plusieurs pièces pour une ‘musicalisation d’un espace déterminé’ (1971)
- De par ce fait, for English horn, basset horn, 7 horns, and tape (1975)
- Son silence bruit, for one musician (1975)
- D’instant en instant, for three groups of 8 instruments (1976)
- Rose des vents, seven-day musical happening in an urban environment (1982)
- Transmusique I à V, for 6 instruments and 2 computers (1986)
- Paysmusique 2, for string quartet and electronics (1992)
- Bruissant et sonnant, for flute and harpsichord (1996)
- Le bruit court, radiophonic music (1996)

== Writings ==
- Mariétan, Pierre. 1970. "Pour une musique à communication orale." VH 101, no.3. Reprinted in Schweizerische Musikzeitung/Revue Musicale Suisse 112 (1972):" 86–89 and in Feedback Papers (Cologne, 1973), no. 5.
- Mariétan, Pierre. 1977. "Son, silence, bruit." Revue d’esthétique 30.
- Mariétan, Pierre. 1994. “État de situations sonores: Pierre Mariétan redessine l'espace acoustique.” Dissonanz/Dissonance no. 39 (February): 4–7.
- Mariétan, Pierre. 1997. La musique du lieu. Bern: Commission Nationale Suisse pour l'UNESCO.
