= Pierre-Paul Savoie =

Canadian dancer and choreographer (1955–2021)

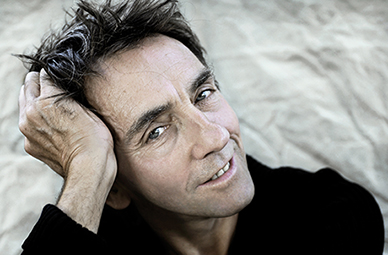
- Born: 14 January 1955; Maria, Quebec, Canada
- Died: 31 January 2021 (aged 66)
- Occupation(s): Dancer; Choreographer

Pierre-Paul Savoie (14 January 1955 – 31 January 2021) was a Canadian dancer and choreographer. He founded the company PPS Danse in Montreal.

== Biography ==
Savoie studied modern dance at Concordia University and the National Theatre School of Canada. He founded PPS Danse in 1989.

A multidisciplinary artist, Savoie collaborated with numerous artists in Quebec and choreographed dancing exhibitions at the 350th birthday of Montreal in 1992. He also choreographed performances at the Montreal International Jazz Festival 1995 in the Cirque du Soleil. In 1996, he received the Prix Jacqueline-Lemieux, awarded by the Canada Council. On 21 February 2008, he was awarded the Prix Hommage-Rideau for his contributions to dance in Quebec. He had served as President of the Regroupement québécois de la danse from 1999 to 2004.

Pierre-Paul Savoie died of cancer on 31 January 2021 at the age of 66.
