= Yasuhiro Morinaga =

Yasuhiro Morinaga 森永 泰弘
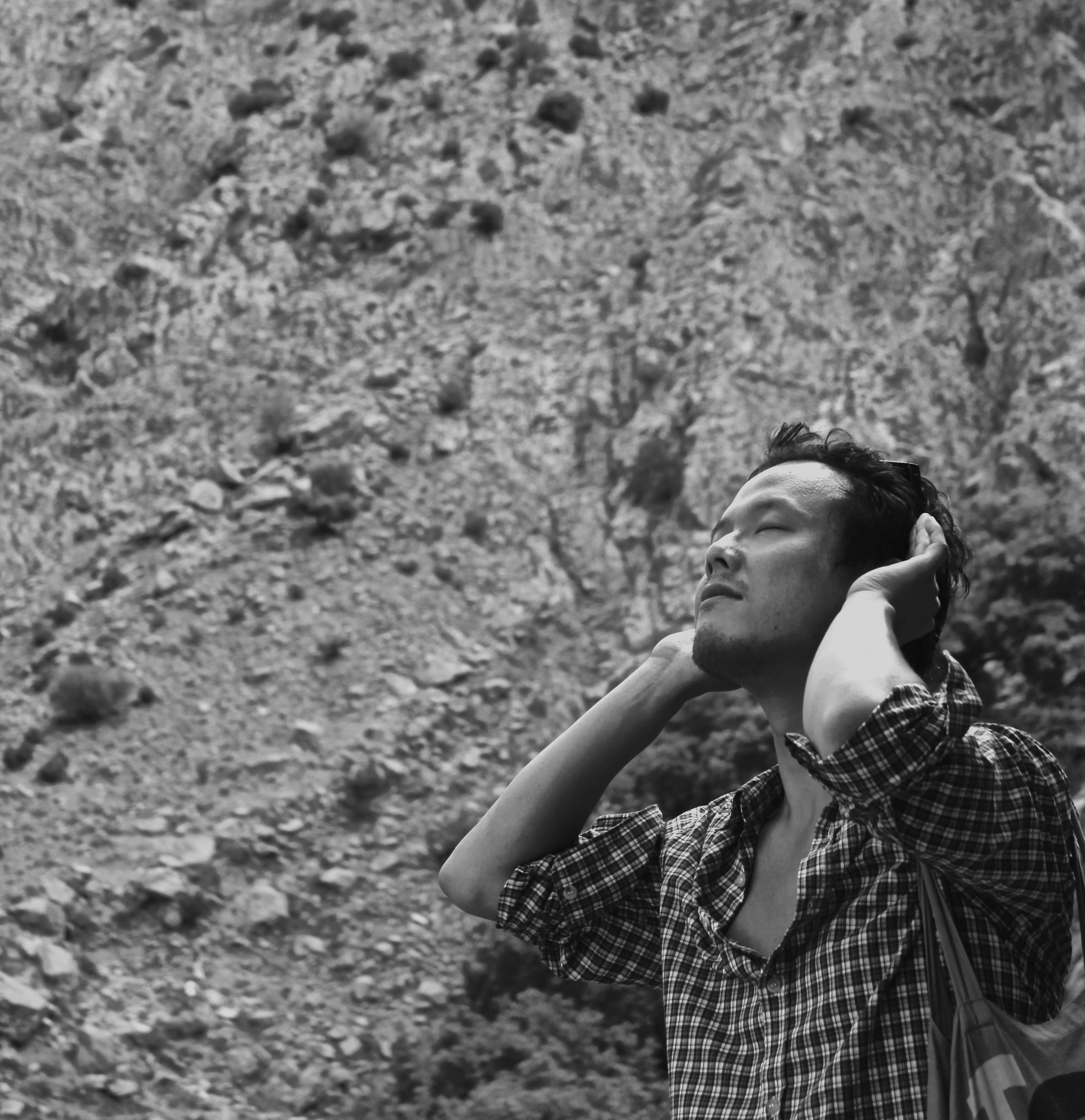
- Yasuhiro Morinaga in August 2012

Background information
- Born: August 1, 1980 (age 46); Tokyo
- Genres: field recording, sound installation, experimental music, ethnographic film
- Occupations: Sound Designer, Composer, Sound Artist, Ethnographic Filmmaker
- Years active: 2007-present
- Label: Concrete
- Website: Concrete

Yasuhiro Morinaga (森永 泰弘, Morinaga Yasuhiro; born August 1, 1980) is a sound artist having a particular interest in anthropology and storytelling. Morinaga refines the ethnographic method through fieldwork, documenting and exploring the auditory culture, and producing immersive sound installations and stage performances.

Morinaga also works as a sound designer and music director for feature films, documentaries, performing arts, and corporate installations. Morinaga has been engaged in curation for the ethnographic media production and lab, CONCRETE. Since 2021, He has been based in Lisbon, Portugal.

== Installations ==
- 2026: Auto-ethnography: HAMAKAI (NTT ICC (Intercommunication Cetner Tokyo), Japan)
- 2025: Life Entangled - The Secret Story of Shellac (Lisboa Soa 2025, Portugal)
- 2024: The Voice of Inconstant Savage (Gulbenkian Modern Art Center, Lisbon Portugal)
- 2020: POLLINATORS - (Saitama Triennale 2020, Japan)
- 2019: Lab in the forest with Ayoro Laboratory + Naoki Ishikawa (Tobiu Art Festival, Japan)
- 2019: R for Resonance with Ho Tzu Nyen (Sharjah biennale, UAE)
- 2017: Light and Sound on the Planet with Naoki Ishikawa (Ichihara Lakeside Museum, Japan)
- 2017: Critical Dictionary of Southeast Asia with Ho Tzu Nyen (Singapore)
- 2016: Aomori EARTH2016- Roots and Routes (Aomori Museum of Art, Japan)
- 2016: Trading Garden (Sound&City, Ark Hills Roppongi Tokyo, Japan)
- 2015: Aomori EARTH2015- To the Heart of the Unknown Trail (Aomori Museum of Art, Japan)
- 2011: Cloud of Unknowing with Ho Tzu Nyen (Singapore Pavilion at Biennale di Venezia, Italy)
- 2010: Sony contemplating Monolithic Design (Salone Internazionale del Mobile, Italy)
- 2010: Heaven Hell with Chris Chong Chan Fui (Future Projection at Toronto International Film Festival, Canada)
- 2010: A Ripe Volcano with Taiki Sakpisit (Rotterdam International Film Festival, Holland)

== Interdisciplinary Performances ==
- 2025: Life Entangled in collaboration with Robert Millis (TBA Theater, Lisbon)
- 2021: The Threshold in collaboration with Kenta Kojiri) (Goetthe Institute, Tokyo)
- 2019: Setan Jawa in collaboration with Garin Nugroho and Kom-I (Asahi Hall, Tokyo)
- 2018: Gong ex Machina in collaboration with Yudi Ahmad Tajudin (GKJ - Jakarta Art Building, Jakarta)
- 2016: Marginal gongs
- 2016: Message from a Medicine Man
- 2015: A Widow in Batavia
- 2011: Irpinia Soundscape Italy
- 2011: Invisible Cities Italy

== Filmography (sound designer and music director) ==
- 2020: Edge of Daybreak (Dir: Taiki Sakipisit, Thailand) FIPRESCI Award, International Film Festival Rotterdam 2021
- 2019: Science of Fictions (Dir: Yosep Anggi Noen, Indonesia) Special Mention Award, Locarno Film Festival 2019
- 2018: The Seen and Unseen (Dir: Kamila Andini, Indonesia) Grand Prix of the Generation KPlus International Jury - Berlinale 2018
- 2017: Mawari Kagura (Dir: Mirai Osawa, Japan)
- 2016: Uzu (Dir: Gaspard Kuentz, France&Japan)
- 2016: Anastasis (Dir: Faozan Rizal, Tony Broer, Indonesia)
- 2016: Yamato (California) (Dir: Daisuke Miyazaki, Japan)
- 2015: Discovery of the Film - Toshio Matsumoto (Dir: Takefumi Tsutsui, Japan)
- 2014: 9/5 (Omnibus Films with Japan, Thailand, Singapore and China)
- 2013: The One (Dir: Ichiro Yamamoto, Japan)
- 2011: Guilty of Romance (Dir: Sion Sono, Japan)
- 2011: A Boy inside the Boy (Dir:Saburo Teshigawara, Japan)
- 2010: A Lonely Planet (Dir: Takefumi Tsutsui, Japan)
- 2009: Earth (Dir: Ho Tzu Nyen, Singapore)
- 2009: Karaoke (Dir: Chris Chong Chan Fui, Malaysia)
- 2008: Block B (Dir: Chris Chong Chan Fui, Malaysia)
- 2007: A Bao A Qu(Dir: Naoki Kato, Japan)

== Contemporary dance and theater (music director) ==
- 2021: A Hai (with Kenta Kojiri)
- 2021: Dialogue(with Kenta Kojiri)
- 2020: UrFear as a part of Multitude of Peer Gynts (with Theater GARASI)
- 2019: Peer Gynts (with Theater GARASI)
- 2019: The Seen and Unseen (with Kamila Andini)
- 2018: The extremities of a Surface (with Mandeep Raikhy)
- 2018: Medium (with Rianto)
- 2017: Self-Portrait ( with Kenta Kojiri)
- 2017: Surface & Destroy (with Kenta Kojiri / Yoko Seyama)
- 2016: Queen-Size (with Mandeep Raikhy/India)
- 2014: To belong -Suwung- (with Akiko Kitamura/Japan and Indonesia)
- 2014: Shell (with Kana Ote/Japan)
- 2014: 10000 Tigers (with Ho Tzu Nyen/Singapore)
- 2014: Utérus (Foofwa D'Imobilité/Switzerland)
- 2013: To belong -cyclonicdream- (with Akiko Kitamura/Japan and Indonesia)
- 2013: Male and has a straight antenna (with Mandeep Reikhy/India)
- 2012: To belong -dialogue- (with Akiko Kitamura/Japan and Indonesia)

== Discography ==
=== Archival albums ===
- 2010: Archival Sound Series - Ludwig Karl Koch
- 2015: Archival Sound Series - José Maceda 2CDs

=== Field recordings ===
- 2013: Endah Laras [Surakarta, Indonesia]
- 2014: Slamet Gundono [Surakarta, Indonesia]
- 2015: He Xiu Dong(Dongba Shaman) [Yunnan, China]
- 2015: He Wei Xiang [Lijiang, China]
- 2016: Snake Charmer: Narayan Jogi [Rajasthan, India]
- 2022: Exploring Gong Culture of Southeast Asia: [Massif and Archipelago]

=== Outland ethnologies ===
- 2017: "Lonely Lodger" by Li Jianhong (China)
- 2018: "Thang Mo" by Ngoc Dai (Vietnam)
- 2021: "Lijiang With/Out & Hokkaido [we are all great parents]" Compilation CD [3CDs + booklets]

== Teaching/workshop/seminars ==
Morinaga has delivered public lectures, workshops and mentorships at universities and organizations.

- 2025: Guest Lecture - Akita University of Art
- 2025: Guest Lecture for MA program, Tokyo Metropolitan University
- 2025: Guest Artist Kuandu Museum of Fine Arts, Taipei, Taiwan
- 2023: Guest Advisor at Rijksakademie Amesterdam, Netherland
- 2021: Lecture for musical archive - Tama Art University, Tokyo Japan
- 2020: Lecture for field recording & sound design - Master Program in Experimental Workshop, Tama Art University, Tokyo Japan
- 2019: Mentorship for the Workshop - Documentary Dojo, Yamagata Prefecture, Japan (by Yamagata Documentary Film Festival)
- 2018: Workshop and Artist in Residence for field-work - Uymam Project, Hokkaido, Japan (Organized by Tobiu Art community)
- 2018: Lecture for sound design - Mumbai Assembly, Mumbai, India (Organized by Japan Foundation India)
- 2018: Lecture for sound design - Srishti Institute of Art, Design and Technology, India (Organized by Japan Foundation India)
- 2018: Lecture for sound design - Satyajit Ray Film & TV Institute, India (Organized by Japan Foundation India)
- 2017: DJ- "Light and Voice of the Planet" with Naoki Ishikawa - Niigata City Art Museum, Niigata Prefecture, Japan
- 2017: Lecture for the field recording and sound design - Japan Foundation Hanoi, Vietnam
- 2017: DJ- "WYST Collective" - Ensembles Asia Orchestra with Yoshihide Otomo - Yogyakarta, Indonesia
- 2017: DJ- "Light and Voice of the Planet" with Naoki Ishikawa - Mito Art Museum - ACM Theater, Ibaraki Prefecture, Japan
- 2017: Lecture for field recording and sound design - Gunma Prefectural Women's University, Gunma Prefecture, Japan
- 2016: Lecture for sound representation - Tokyo Metropolitan University, Tokyo Japan
- 2016: Seminar: Field Recording - Sound & City Festival, Ark-Hills Roppongi, Tokyo, Japan (Organized by WIRED Magazine)
- 2016: DJ- World Music Night with Keiji Haino and Keiichi Tahara - Ginza Music Bar, Tokyo, Japan
- 2016: Lecture for sound representation - Tokyo Metropolitan University, Tokyo Japan
- 2015: Workshop for field recording and sonic ethnology - Aomori Museum of Art
- 2015: Workshop: Miyakojima Collective - Ensembles Asia Orchestra with Yoshihide Otomo and Naoki Ishikawa
- 2014: Lecture for sound design - Chinese University of Hong Kong, Hong Kong
- 2013: Workshop for field recording and sound design - Academia di Belle Art di Napoli, Naples, Italy
- 2013: Workshop for sound design - Chino Cultural Complex, Nagano Prefecture, Japan
- 2013: Lecture for sound design - Tokyo Polytechnic University, Tokyo, Japan
- 2012: Workshop for sound design - International Web-Art Festival, Pescara, Italy
- 2012: Workshop for sound design - Shinshu University, Nagano Prefecture, Japan
- 2012: Workshop for sound design - GATI dance forum, New Delhi, India (Organized by Japan Foundation India)
- 2012: Lecture for sound design - Tokyo Polytechnic University, Tokyo, Japan
- 2009: Initiator for the International Conference for the sound and moving images "SOUND CONTINUUM" (funded by the Ministry of Cultural Affairs)

== Awards/Grants ==
- 2022: Thai Film Critics Best Film Score, Thailand
- 2021: Agency for Cultural Affairs: Emerging Artists researching outside of Japan
- 2020: China/Japan residency project with Lijiang Studio S
- 2019: S-Air Award: S-Air/POINTS center for the Contemporary Art China
- 2018: Villa Kujouyama Kyoto [French Institute of Japan], with Gaspard Kuentz
- 2018: Uymam Project [by Ministry of Culture Japan], Hokkaido, Japan
- 2016-2018: Japan Foundation Asia Center – Promotion of Cultural Collaboration
- 2016: Japan Foundation Asia Center – Promotion of Cultural Collaboration [3years project]
- 2013: ACC: Research fellowship: Asian Cultural Council – Yunnan Province of China
- 2010: Agency for Cultural Affairs: Project Grant for the International Conference in Sound
- 2010: Nippon Foundation & Kyoto University: API research fellowship
