= Roberto Paci Dalò =

Italian musician

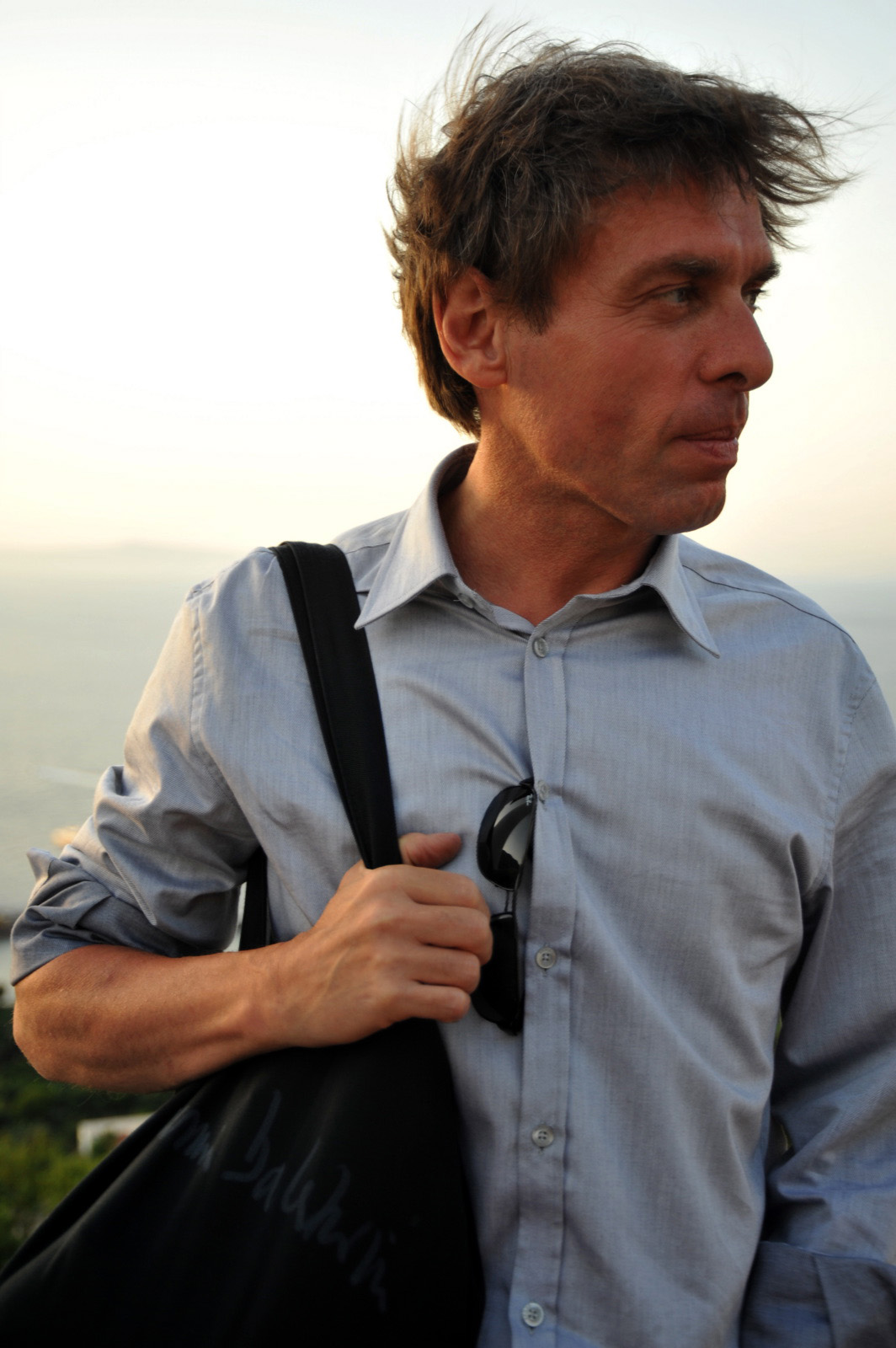
- Dalò in 2009
- Born: Rimini, Italy
- Awards: Prix Ars Electronica Award of Distinction for Interactive Arts in 1994 and 1999. Djerassi Foundation Residency (1987). DAAD Artists-in-Berlin Program Fellowship (1993-1994). Premio Napoli 2015 per la lingua e la cultura italiana.

Roberto Paci Dalò is an Italian author, composer and musician, film maker and theatre director, sound and visual artist, radio-maker. He is the co-founder and director of the performing arts ensemble Giardini Pensili and he has been the artistic director of Wikimania 2016 Esino Lario. He won the Premio Napoli per la lingua e la cultura italiana in 2015.

== Life and career ==
After musical, visual, and architecture studies in Fiesole, Faenza and Ravenna, in 1993 he receives the DAAD Artists-in-Berlin Program Fellowship. He taught Media Dramaturgy and New Media at the university of Siena and teaches Exhibit & Experience Design at UNIRSM Design Università degli Studi della Repubblica di San Marino. Since 2017 he is founder and director of Usmaradio, radio station and Research Centre for Radiophonic Studies.

In 1993 he conceives the project Publiphono. In 1994, with Marina Abramović and Barbara Bloom he has been invited to the project “Bildende Kunst auf dem Theater” at Hebbel-Theater, Berlin. In 1995 the Kronos Quartet premiered at the Vienna Opera House his composition Nodas. In 1997 he creates Trance Bakxai, an artist's rave inspired by Euripides. In 2001, he stages the performance work Metamorfosi. In the same year he presented the film RAX, dedicated to the artist Robert Adrian X, at the Vienna Kunsthalle. In 2002, he creates with the English artist and musician Philip Jeck the film and concert performance Mush Room. In 2004, he and Olga Neuwirth created the staged concert Italia anno zero after texts by Antonio Gramsci, Pier Paolo Pasolini and Giacomo Leopardi widely presented across Europe. In 2006, he created the music-theatre production Organo magico organo laico featuring Mouse on Mars and Icarus musicians at the REC Festival (Teatro Valli, Reggio Emilia). In the same year he creates the music-theatre work Cenere.

In 2007, he presented his solo exhibition City Works - urban explorations and interventions in the cities of Berlin, Mexico City, Linz, Naples, Rimini, Rome, Vancouver - at the Gallery SESV (University of Florence - Department of Architecture). In the same year he presents his solo exhibition Sparks (site-specific installation and drawings on paper) at the contemporary arts centre Palazzo delle Papesse Siena and the videoinstallation Shadows at Studio Zero, the exhibition space of Duomo Hotel created by Ron Arad in Rimini.

In 2012, he creates in Shanghai the audio-visual performance Ye Shanghai; the project deals with several aspects of the Shanghainese life before 1949. At the core of this work is the story of the Shanghai Ghetto, an area of approximately one square mile located in the Hongkou District of Japanese-occupied Shanghai. He produced a series of Berlin projects based on Heiner Müller's texts: Greuelmärchen - sound/video installation (Internationale Heiner Müller Gesellschaft, Berlin), Schwarzes Licht, Roter Schnee. In 2021, he was stage director and set designer of Repertoire by Mauricio Kagel at Aperto Festival in Reggio Emilia.

He collaborates with a number of institutions and research centres including the Joint Research Centre of the European Commission, the University of the Republic of San Marino, University of Bologna, IULM University Milan, University of Newcastle Culture Lab (UK), Domus Academy Milan, Brera Fine Arts Academy Milan, Ascoli Piceno and Rome universities, and Great Northern Way Campus, where he develops projects between technology, art, and the urban space in collaboration with designers, architects, city planners, artists, programmers, theoreticians and hackers. He is member of the Internationale Heiner Müller Gesellschaft Berlin. He is artist-in-residence at Djerassi Foundation (San Francisco), STEIM (Amsterdam), Ars Electronica FutureLab (Linz), Montévidéo and GMEM (Marseille), La Bellone (Brusells), Western Front (Vancouver), Tonspur / MuseumsQuartier (Vienna).

== Works ==
Roberto Paci Dalò has developed a multi-layered language out of his background in sound and visual arts, which combines the spoken language with body and architecture. His work uses new technologies in combination with an analysis on classical tragic drama. The areas of work of Roberto Paci Dalò includes robotics, cybernetics, man-machine interaction, psychoacoustics, realtime video and sound processing. He wrote, composed and directed since 1985 about 40 music-theatre works presented worldwide. He composed music for acoustical ensembles, electronics, voices and a large number of radioworks produced by European broadcasting corporations. His production of films and videos is regularly presented in international festivals. His dramaturgical materials are frequently re-composed in sound and video installations – often site specific and interactive – presented in museums, galleries, and the public space. As performer he developed extended techniques on the clarinet and with electronics and sampler. His performances range from solo to electro-acoustical ensembles and improvised music projects in collaboration with other artists. His interest in traditional cultures brought him into explorations and field researches through the Mediterranean, Eastern Europe, Balkans and the North West European islands. He works on expansions of radio language(s) especially through his long-term collaboration with ORF Kunstradio. Among his on-site/on-air/on-line projects: La Natura Ama Nascondersi (Kunstradio 1992), Napoli (Nantes 1994, official selection Prix Italia), La lunga notte (1993, award EBU/UER), Lost Memories (Graz 1994, official selection Prix Futura), Many Many Voices (Haus der Kulturen der Welt, Berlino 1995, CD Edel Records / Akademie der Künste Berlin), Fuori Luogo (commissioned by SFB Sender Freies Berlin for the Prix Europa 98 opening), OZ (SFB / Sonambiente 1996), Italia anno zero (2005), L'assedio delle ceneri (RAI, 2008). Urban explorations is a fundamental aspect of his work. He collects soundscapes since the beginning of the 80's. Some of this activity is documented on-line in the permanent website Atlas Linz (since 1998) created in collaboration with the Ars Electronica Center Linz.

=== Curatorial work ===
He founded in 1985 the performing arts ensemble Giardini Pensili with Isabella Bordoni. Between 1991 and 1998, he created and curated in Rimini the International radio + art festival LADA L’Arte dell'Ascolto. He brought to Rimini artists like Heiner Goebbels, Ensemble Modern, Llorenç Barber, Soldier String Quartet, Scanner, David Moss, Rupert Huber (Tosca), Sam Auinger, Hannes Strobl, Tibor Szemzö a.o. Since 1990 he is curator and co-ordinator of international projects based on telecommunication systems and the Internet as working places (i.e. trustee of the Mediterranean network of Horizontal Radio, Ars Electronica 1995; Rivers & Bridges). In 1995 opens the Giardini Pensili Web Site. In 1995 he creates Radio Lada - web art radio. Between 1999 and 2001 he is the curator of Itaca - the electronic stage of the Teatro di Roma - working together with Mario Martone and he is co-curator of the project Aria-Net (Marseille, Lisbon, Rimini, Vienna). In 2000, he curated — invited by RAI — part of the Radio and Internet programme within the Prix Italia (Bologna-Rimini) and in 2004 he creates the label LADA L’Arte dell’Ascolto. Between 2006 and 2016—when the structure closed down – he was the artistic director of the contemporary arts centre Velvet Factory (Rimini),

=== Theatre and Music-Theatre ===
- Sentieri Segreti, 1985
- Corrispondenze Naturali, 1986
- Sound House, 1986
- Un cantico / partiture sonore, 1986
- A Harmonic Walk, 1987
- Cave di pietra, 1987
- Il calore della terra, 1987
- Nel fondo del giardino, 1987
- Terre Unite, 1988
- Terre Separate, 1988
- Temporale, 1989
- Terrae Motvs, 1991
- Niemandsland, 1992
- Terra di Nessuno, 1993
- Auroras, 1994
- Metrodora, 1996
- Scanning Bacchae, 1997
- Trance Bakxai, 1997
- Nishmat Hashmal, 1998
- Cieli altissimi retrocedenti, 1998
- Enigma, 1998
- Stasimi, 1998
- Sophon Sophia, 1998
- Il Cartografo, 1999
- Affreschi / due porte per Tebe, 1999
- Sirene, 2000
- Shir, 2000
- Animalie, 2002
- Blue Stories, 2001
- Metamorfosi, 2001
- Local & Long Distance, 2003
- Petrolio / Rose, 2003
- Stelle della sera, 2004
- Filmnero, 2004
- Altri fuochi, 2005
- Porpora, 2005
- Italia anno zero, 2005
- Petroleo México, 2005
- Tremante omaggio, 2005
- Qual è la parola, 2006
- Organo magico organo laico, 2006
- Words, 2006
- Cenere, 2006
- L'assedio delle ceneri, 2008
- Roter Schnee, 2009
- Black Beauty, 2011
- De bello Gallico - Enklave Rimini, 2011
- Ye Shanghai, 2012
- Il grande bianco, 2014
- 1915 The Armenian Files, 2015
- Niggunim, 2018
- Niggunim | Nobori, 2018
- Repertoire, 2021

=== Radio and Telematic Projects ===
- 1989 Segnali radio sulla costa atlantica. ORF / Kunstradio, Vienna. ORF 1, 26.1.1989.
- 1989 Quattro canti sulla circolarità del tempo. RAI Radiouno / Audiobox. RAI Radiouno, 16.2.1989.
- 1991 Combattimento tra Marsia e Apollo. Opera radiofonica by Roberto Paci Dalò and Jon Rose. SFB Sender Freies Berlin, SFB, June 1991.
- 1992 La natura ama nascondersi: Mozart in Budapest 1791-1832. Giardini Pensili, ORF Vienna "Geometrie des Schweigens", Vienna, Palais Lichtenstein Museum Moderner Kunst- Innsbruckl, Tyrolean State Museum in interactive video and sound connection, 1992
- 1992 Niemandsland. ORF Kunstradio Vienna, with the collaboration of Transit Innsbruck and Giardini Pensili Innsbruck, Tiroler Landesmuseum and Landesstudio Tirol, 1992
- 1993 La lunga notte Halaila Ha'aroch / Leilun Tauil. Österreichischer Rundfunk / Kunstradio, RAI Radiotelevisione Italiana / Audiobox, L'Arte dell'Ascolto. 30.8.1993
- 1993 Napoli. Giardini Pensili, ORF Kunstradio, L'Alfabeto Urbano in collaboration with RAI Radiouno Audiobox, October 1993
- 1994 Lost Memories. Giardini Pensili Rimini, ESC Graz, ORF Kunstradio with the collaboration of RAI Radiotre Audiobox, Graz ESC / ORF1, 29.9.1994
- 1995 Realtime. ORF Kunstradio. 1.12.1995
- 1995 Many Many Voices. SFB Sender Freies Berlin, Giardini Pensili Rimini, ORF Kunstradio Vienna, RNE Radio-2 Madrid, YLE Yleisradio Helsinki with the collaboration of: Institut Français de Berlin, Italienischer Kulturinstitut Berlin, Österreichischer Generalkonsulat Berlin, Elektronisches Studio der TU. Simultaneous Live Broadcasting. SFB 4 MultiKulti and YLE Finland in performance from the Haus der Kulturen der Welt Berlin. 29.1.1995
- 1995 Horizontal Radio. 23.6.1995.
- 1996 Oz. Akademie der Künste Berlin, Sender Freies Berlin, Giardini Pensili. Berlin, SFB Lichthof, 7.3.1996
- 1996 Terra di nessuno. Giardini Pensili, RAI Audiobox. RAI Radiotre Audiobox March 30.3.1996
- 1996 Shpil. Phonurgia Nova Arles, Giardini Pensili, RAI Audiobox, San Marino RTV, Kunsthochschule für Medien Cologne, Kol Israel. RAI Radiotre Audiobox 10.8.1996
- 1998 Atlanti invisibili. Giardini Pensili, RAI Audiobox. ORF Kunstradio. 3.9.1998
- 1998 Genetliaco. RAI Audiobox, July 1998
- 2001 Blue Stories - Vienna Remix. Giardini Pensili in collaboration with ORF Kunstradio, RaiNet. ORF Kunstradio, July 3.7.2001
- 2002 Devolve into II. Oesterreich 1 and Radio Oesterreich International. 17.3.2002

Kunstradio Live radio version in conjunction with the on site installation in Vienna. From studio RP4, Vienna Broadcastinghouse. Klangtheater Live radio. March 24.3.2002 Bayern2Radio/ hr2 /WDR 3/ Oe1/ NordwestRadio/ SR2. Intermedium 2 - radio broadcast (mix from the Klangtheater installation in Vienna). ZKM Radio/Intermedium2 Radio piece. Oesterreich 1 and Radio Oesterreich International. March 31.3.2002

- 2002 Transfert. musikprotokoll im steirischen herbst, Transcultures Bruxelles und Wien Modern in Zusammenarbeit mit dem Ö1 Kunstradio. ORF Kunstradio, 3.11.2002
- 2004 Italia Anno Zero. By Olga Neuwirth and Roberto Paci Dalò. Giardini Pensili & Wien Modern in collaboration with Budapest Autumn Festival, ORF Kunstradio, Terra Gramsci supported by Réseau Varèse and the European Commission (Culture 2000). ORF Kunstradio, 28.10.2004
- 2005 Kol Beck - Living Strings. WDR Studio Akustische Kunst, Cologne, 24.9.2005
- 2008 L'assedio delle ceneri. RAI Radiotre. Eleven episodes, June–July 2008
- 2009 Merkur. ORF Kunstradio, Vienna Funkhaus, 6.12.2009
- 2013 Ye Shanghai. ORF Kunstradio, Vienna Funkhaus, 13.1.2013
- 2015 1915 The Armenian Files. ORF Kunstradio, Vienna Funkhaus, 3.5.2015
- 2017 For Morton Feldman. In collaboration with Rupert Huber. ORF Kunstradio, Vienna Funkhaus, 15.1.2017
- 2017 Long Night Talks. For Robert Adrian. ORF Kunstradio, Vienna Funkhaus, 30.7.2017
- 2020 CROWN. Usmaradio, series of 33 episodes
- 2020 Hannah. Radio India
- 2020 HA. ORF Kunstradio, Vienna, 27.12.2020

=== Discography ===
- Napoli (1993)
- Ars Acustica International - EBU Selection 1994 /La lunga notte/ (1995)
- Many Many Voices (1995)
- Horizontal Radio (1996)
- Familie Auer (1996)
- Sumi /Various/ (1998)
- Ozio (2000)
- City Sonics /EMN40/ (2003)
- In Two Worlds (2004)
- Pneuma (2004)
- AVN+RPD (with Absolute Value of Noise) (2005)
- WITZ FM (with Francesca Mizzoni) (2006)
- Sparks (2007)
- Alluro (2010)
- The Maya Effect (with Scanner) (2011)
- Japanese Girls at the Harbor (with Yasuhiro Morinaga)(2012)
- Ye Shanghai (2014)
- 1915 The Armenian Files (2015)
- Long Night Talks (2020)
- Italia anno zero (with Olga Neuwirth a.o.) (2021)
- Transcreando Shakespeare (2021)
- Crown Shyness part 2-3 (with Francesco Poggianti) (2022)
- Live in Verucchio (with Andrea Marinelli, Demetrio Cecchitelli) (2022)

=== Filmography ===
- 2001 Camera Obscura - based on the music-theatre performance Metamorfosi starring Anna Bonaiuto (Official selection Locarno Film Festival)
- 2001 RAX - a documentary - interview to Canadian artist Robert Adrian X (Official selection Locarno Film Festival)
- 2001 Blue Stories - live cinema (Official selection Locarno Film Festival)
- 2002 EMN40 - film after the audio-video installation commissioned by the Ensemble Musiques Nouvelles for its 40th anniversary
- 2003 Dust - film created as a contribution to the Rome Quadriennale (Official selection Locarno Film Festival)
- 2005 Petroleo México - filmed in Ciudad de México (Official selection Locarno Film Festival)
- 2007 Shadows - after the videoinstallation for the Duomo Hotel created by Ron Arad
- 2007 IMA Portrait #3 Heidi Grundmann - a documentary - interview to Kunstradio's founder and former producer Heidi Grundmann
- 2008 Nitschland Napoli - film created under invitation of the Fondazione Morra Napoli on the occasion of the Museo Hermann Nitsch's opening
- 2009 Atlas of Emotion Stream - after Giuliana Bruno's book "Atlas of Emotion". Film commissioned by PAN Palazzo delle Arti Napoli
- 2013 Ye Shanghai
- 2015 1915 The Armenian Files
- 2017 Douala Flow
- 2018 In darkness let me dwell
- 2019 Appunto Angheben

=== Books ===
- AA.VV., Re-inventing Radio - Aspects of radio as art, Heidi Grundmann, Elisabeth Zimmermann, Reinhard Braun, Dieter Daniels, Andreas Hirsch, Anne Thurmann-Jajes (edited by), Frankfurt: Revolver books, 2008, ISBN 978-3-86588-453-4.
- Bordoni, Isabella, Paci Dalò, Roberto, Giardini Pensili. Il libro dei paesaggi, Ravenna: Exit Edizioni, 1987.
- Montecchi, Leonardo, Paci Dalò, Roberto (edited by), Officine della dissociazione, Bologna: Pitagora Editrice, 2000.
- Fragliasso, Savina, Paci Dalò, Roberto, Pneuma. Giardini Pensili un paesaggio sonoro, Monfalcone: Teatro Comunale di Monfalcone, 2005.
- Paci Dalò, Roberto, Quinz, Emanuele (edited by), Millesuoni. Deleuze, Guattari e la musica elettronica, Naples: Cronopio, 2006.
- Paci Dalò, Roberto, Storie di lupi e lepri, Naples: Hde, 2009.
- Paci Dalò, Roberto, Filmnero, Milan: Marsèll, 2016.
- Paci Dalò, Roberto, Ombre, Macerata: Quodlibet, 2019.
- Paci Dalò, Roberto, eBAU. Art Dreams for the New European Bauhaus, Macerata: Quodlibet, 2024.
