= Rodolfo Acosta (composer) =

Colombian composer (born 1970)

Rodolfo Acosta Restrepo (born 1970) is a Colombian composer, performer, improviser and professor of music.

== Biography ==
Born in Bogotá, Colombia, in 1970, Acosta studied music theory and composition in Colombia, Uruguay, France, U.S.A., Mexico and the Netherlands, at institutions such as G.M.E.B., Fondation Royaumont, STEIM and Berklee College of Music. Among his most influential teachers are Coriún Aharonián, Graciela Paraskevaidis, Klaus Huber and Brian Ferneyhough.

Acosta's compositions have received prizes and other recognitions at national and international levels. His music – both acoustic and electroacoustic – has been presented in some thirty countries of the Americas, Europe and Asia, has been published in score form by El Mercurio magazine, Matiz Rangel Editores, the Ministry of Culture of Colombia and the Francisco José de Caldas District University, and on CD by Editorial Musical Sur, ACME (Colombian Association for Electroacoustic Music), Quindecim Recordings, IDCT (District Institute of Culture and Tourism), the Colombian-French Alliance, the FJC District University and the Secretariat of Culture, Recreation and Sports, the Ministry of Culture of Colombia, La Distritofónica, CCMC (Colombian Contemporary Music Circle), as well as independent productions.

Acosta a founding member of CCMC (Colombian Contemporary Music Circle), a non-profit association dedicated to the promotion and development of contemporary music in Colombia. He is the founder and director of Ensamble CG, a chamber ensemble formed in 1995 and dedicated to the performance of contemporary repertoire, with a special emphasis on Latin American and Colombian music, carrying out over 150 Colombian and World premieres. He is also founder and director of EMCA (ASAB Contemporary Music Ensemble), the longest-running contemporary music student group in Colombia. Since the early 1990s he has been actively involved in the experimental improvisation scene in Bogotá, both in free and conducted formats, performing with many local and foreign improvisers. Long-term projects within this field include Tangram and more recently, the B.O.I. (Bogotá Improvisers' Orchestra).

He is professor of music at the District University's ASAB School of Arts, as well as at the Central University's School of Music, both in Bogotá. Likewise, he teaches in the Masters in Literary and Musical Studies of the Mexican/North American Institute of Cultural Relations in Monterrey, Mexico. His main fields of interest in teaching are: composition, history, theory and analysis, as well as performance of contemporary and experimental music. He has been professor and lecturer in these fields at different universities and conservatories throughout the Americas and Europe.

Finally, Acosta is a member of the editorial committee of Cuadernos de Música, Artes Visuales y Artes Escénicas of the Pontificia Universidad Javeriana. His own research and analytical texts have been published in books (such as the Gran Enciclopedia de Colombia, published by Círculo de Lectores/El Tiempo), periodicals (such as A Contratiempo, published by the Music Documentation Center of the National Library of Colombia) and web pages (such as the influential "latinoamérica música").
