= Lucio Garau =

Italian composer

Lucio Garau (born 9 December 1959) is an Italian composer of contemporary music and pianist.

Garau graduated in Piano and Composition at the Conservatorio di Cagliari, where he studied with Franco Oppo. His compositional aesthetics are influenced from acousmatic issues, but he also composes vocal and instrumental chamber music, sometimes with live electronics.

In 1991, he founded MiniM Ensemble to investigate the techniques of minimal music. He is the artistic director of Amici della Musica di Cagliari.

== Discography ==
- Musica presente 4 (AA.VV. Fonit Cetra) (1994)
- Ricercare 1 (AA.VV. Ricercare) (1997)
- Ricercare 2 (AA.V. Ricercare) (1998)
- Electric Dream (AA.VV. Intersound) (1999)
- Le Corde di Sicilo (AA.VV. Unda Maris) (2004)
- Isole in musica (AA.VV. Agorà) (2007)
- 35-36 Bozen Festival of contemporary music (AA.VV. Bozen) (2011)

== Works ==
- op. 1, EO’ (voice and delay) (1990)
- op. 2, Hidden Music for 12 strings (1989–91)
- op. 3, Hidden music for a percussionist (1991)
- op. 4, Sacrum (5 male voices) (1992)
- op. 5, Canoni (recorder and delay) (1992)
- op. 6 n. 1, Epitaffio (3 Harps) (1991)
- op. 6 n. 2, Epitaffio (voice and string trio) (1992)
- op. 6 n. 3, Epitaffio (clarinet, violin, alto, cello, vibraphone) (1993)
- op. 6 n. 4, Epitaffio (electric guitar, marimba and vibraphone, doublebass) (1992)
- op. 7, Compresenze erranti (piano and video installation) (1993)
- op. 8, Trasparenze (per 2 flauti dolci contrabbassi) (1994)
- op. 9, Trio (Orti) (voice, recorder, percussion, video) (1994)
- op. 10, Mercato (5 musicians) (1994)
- op. 11, Tabulatura Nova 1° ricercare (cello and live electronics) (1994)
- op. 12, siamo sicuri? questions for 6 young musicians (6 piano player on 2 pianos) (1994)
- op. 13, Dream (Madre) (6 strings, 6 voices, 1 piano or vibraphone or celesta) (1995)
- op. 14, Ballu (piano) (1995)
- op. 15, Rondeau (trumpet and organ) (1995)
- op. 16, Consenso (any kind of instrument and sampler) (1995)
- op. 17, J...X (preludio) (electric guitar) (1995)
- op. 18, Principe (vibraphone and glockenspiels) (1995)
- op. 19, S’oda nodas (per 4 suoni e live electronics) (1995)
- op. 20, i 9 colpi (3 percussionists and sampler) (1993)
- op. 21, Trio (acousmatic) (1996)
- op. 22, Ecolalia (6 male voices) (1996)
- op. 23, Voyage (sound installations and 4 percussionists) (1996)
- op. 24, Essere è tempo (vibraphone, electric guitar, harp, doublebass, tape) (1997)
- op. 25, c, b, a (variati) (orchestra) (1998)
- op. 26, 1° String quartet (Cangianti) (1998)
- op. 27, Numeri (acousmatic) (1997–98)
- op. 28, Be-bop (5 players) (1998)
- op. 29, Anninnia (voice) (1999)
- op. 30, 999 (flute, clarinet, violin, cello, piano) (1999)
- op. 31, Memoria (violin) (2000)
- op. 32, xballu (accordion) (2001)
- op. 33, Trio -The Man i love- (violin, cello and piano) (2001)
- op. 34 n. 1, Variation on the night sounds (flute, oboe, clarinet, bassoon, french horn, percussion, electric guitar, piano, violin, alto, cello, double bass) (2001–02)
- op. 34 n. 2, Variazioni on the night sounds (flute, oboe, clarinet, bassoon, percussion, guitar, piano, violin, alto, cello) (2002)
- op. 35, Appunti (acousmatic) (1997–2002)
- op. 36, 2 Minuti di raccoglimento -per Carlo Giuliani- (acousmatic) (2003)
- op. 37, Tre invenzioni a tre parti (piano) (2002)
- op. 38, op. 38 T, (strings) (2002)
- op. 39, tr. (39a) (piano and 11 strings) (2002)
- op. 40, Aurora (female choir) (2003)
- op. 41, Suite (accordion, tape and live electronics) (2003)
- op. 42, Aurora nel mare (orchestra) (2003)
- op. 43, Trasformazioni (acousmatic) (2003)
- op. 44, Accordion Concerto (2004)
- op. 45 n. 2, Variation upon an old tune (guitar) (2004)
- op. 46, Klavierbuchlein (piano) (2005–2013)
- op. 47 n. 1, Sonata a quattro (4 recorders) (2005)
- op. 48, Pinocchio notturno (clarinet, accordion, violin, cello, toy piano and sampled voices) (2005)
- op. 49, First suite per il basso di viola da gamba (2006–2008)
- op. 50, Qimbe, 5 variation upon family themes (acousmatic) (2006)
- op. 51, Una storia indicibile (5 voices, piano, percussion) (2006)
- op. 52, Harpsichord Concerto (amplified harpsichord and jazz band) (2007)
- op. 53, 6 sonate -from Domenico Scarlatti- (2007)
- op. 54, Acousmatic Suite (siren, tape, voice, percussion) (2008)
- op. 55, Petite Suite (2 different keyboards) (2009)
- op. 56, Solo (flute) (2009)
- op. 57, Contrappunto (sax and live electronics) (2009)
- op. 58, Veil'd Melancholy (voice, gamba and string quartet) (2010)
- op. 59, Pacific Trash Vortex (piano) (2010)
- op. 60, Fungaia (sax, doublebass, piano and live electronics) (2011)
- op. 61, Concertino (piano and ensemble) (2011)
- op. 62, Io so(orchestra) (2012)
- op. 63, 3 studi (variable instrument and live electronics) (2012)
- op. 64, 5 miniatures (viola da gamba and Fokekr organ) (2012)
- op. 65, Primo concerto grosso (contrabassoon, sax bar., double bass, clarinet, piano, electric bass, percussion and live electronics) (2013)
- op. 67, Spring s springs deve andare in galera (soprano, flute, clarinet, harp, marimba, piano, violin, alto, cello and live electronics) (2013)
- op. 68, 6 studi acusmatici (2014)
- op. 69, Duo ( piano and vibraphone) (2014)
- op. 70, Duo (Sax and hammond organ) (2014)
- op. 71, Sospeso (bass drum and tape) (2014)
- op. 72, Tre studi per percussione e live electronics" (2014)
- op. 73, Tre pezzi molto simili (flute, clarinet, alto, percussion, electric guitar, Carrillo piano and Fokker organ)" (2014)
- op. 74, Guido nella notte, three symphonic dreams" (2015)
- op. 75, sonata per oboe e pianoforte" (2015)
- op. 76, in fra(m)menti (voices, violin, piano and vibraphone)" (2015)
- op. 77, Moira (violoncassa and voice)" (2015)
- op. 78, 4 momenti dal sesto canto dell’Iliade (flute, oboe, clarinet, percussion, piano, violin, alto, cello, double bass and children’s choir)" (2015)
