= Christian Calon =

French-born Canadian composer

Christian Calon (born 5 September 1950) is a French-born Canadian composer who is active in electroacoustic music. He has worked extensively in large computer-based studios in Canada and Europe and has received commissions from the Canada Council, the Groupe de Musique Expérimentale de Marseille, and the Ministère des Affaires culturelles du Québec. His work is written in an expressionist and narrative style and his pieces are characterized by acousmatic diffusion.

== Life ==
Born in Marseille, he immigrated to Canada in 1966 and settled in Montréal. Calon is a largely self-taught musician who became interested in electroacoustic music through his friend and mentor, Francis Dhomont. He received his only formal training at McGill University where he pursued graduate studies in computer music for one year.

Calon began his composing career in Montréal. In 1986 he co-founded the Canadian Electroacoustic Community with some 100 other musicians, serving as the organization's vice-president in 1989–90. In 1985 his work Portrait d'un Visiteur won first prize at the 1985 Luigi Russolo International Competition. He moved to Europe in 1990, and in 1991 was appointed music director of the studios of the Groupe de Musique Expérimentale de Marseille. In 1995–96, with the support of the DAAD (Germany), he was one of the foreign artists in residence in Berlin. He is currently based in Montreal.

== List of works ==
- Aiguiser l'ouïe (2001)
- Atlas (2005–08)
- Constellations (1992–94)
- Les corps éblouis (1994)
- La disparition (1988)
- Documents de surface (2002), radio roadmovie in collaboration with Chantal Dumas
- Dunkelblau (2008), film opera in collaboration with Uli Aumüller
- En vol (1994)
- Infamie: Fragmente einer Kartographie (2005)
- [improvisation] (2005)
- Lettre à M. (1995), radio work
- men women train (1995)
- Minuit (1989)
- Le petit homme dans l'oreille (2000), radio roadmovie in collaboration with Chantal Dumas
- Portrait d'un visiteur (1985)
- Prochaine station (1990), in collaboration with Claude Schryer
- Le projet Ulysse (1997–2000),
- Sémaphore-Nord (1997)
- Souffles primitifs (2001), bass flute, and tape
- The Standing Man (1994–96), installation-performance for three-dimensional sound spaces (projected from 24 channels), on a poem by François Villon
- The Ulysses project (1997–1998), radio work, for DeutschlandRadio Berlin
- Temps incertains (1990)
- Time Well (2000)
- Vers les oiseaux (2002)
- Die Windrose (2008)
- Die Zimmer der Erinnerung [Les chambres de la mémoire] (1997), a fictional essay for radio after Marcel Proust (DeutschlandRadio Berlin)
- z | s (un essai sur le Temps) (1999–2002), (DeutschlandRadio Berlin)

== Awards ==
- 2006 – Prix Opus, Quebec
- 2004 – Represents Canada at the World New Music Days (Switzerland)
- 2003 – Distinction at the International CIMESP competition (Brazil)
- 2003 – Selection of the Confluencias International Competition (Spain)
- 2001 – Grand Prix Phonurgia Nova (France)
- 1999 – Grand Prix Marulic of the UER/EBU
- 1997 – Mention at the Prix Ars Electronica (Austria)
- 1996 – Lynch-Staunton Prize (Canada)
- 1995 – Mention at the Prix Ars Electronica (Austria)
- 1995 – Residency at the DAAD (Germany)
- 1994 – 2nd Prize at the Concours International de Bourges (France)
- 1991 – 2nd Prize at the NEWCOMP International Computer Music Competition (USA)
- 1989 – 1st Prize at the Concours International de Bourges (France)
- 1989 – Chosen to represent Canada at the World Music Days
- 1988 – 2nd Prize at the NEWCOMP International Computer Music Competition (USA)
- 1985 – 1st Prize at the Concours International Luigi Russolo (Italia)

== Recordings ==
- Radio Roadmovies with Chantal Dumas (326 music, 326 006/007, 2003)
- Les corps éblouis (empreintes DIGITALes, IMED 9838, 1998), nominated for the album of the year at the 1998 "Opus Awards" (Canada)
- Ligne de vie: récits électriques (empreintes DIGITALes, IMED 9001, 1990), selected for the 1990 Grammy Awards.

His works also appear on these compilations:

- Électro clips (empreintes DIGITALes, IMED 9004, IMED 9604),
- Anthology of Canadian Music: Electroacoustic music (Radio Canada International, AMC 37),
- DISContact! II (CEC, 95CD1-2),
- Cultures électroniques 4 (Le chant du monde, LDC 278049/50), and
- Cultures électroniques 8 (Mnémosyne musique média, LDC 278058/59).
