= Giorgio Nottoli =

Italian composer, musician and academic (born 1945)

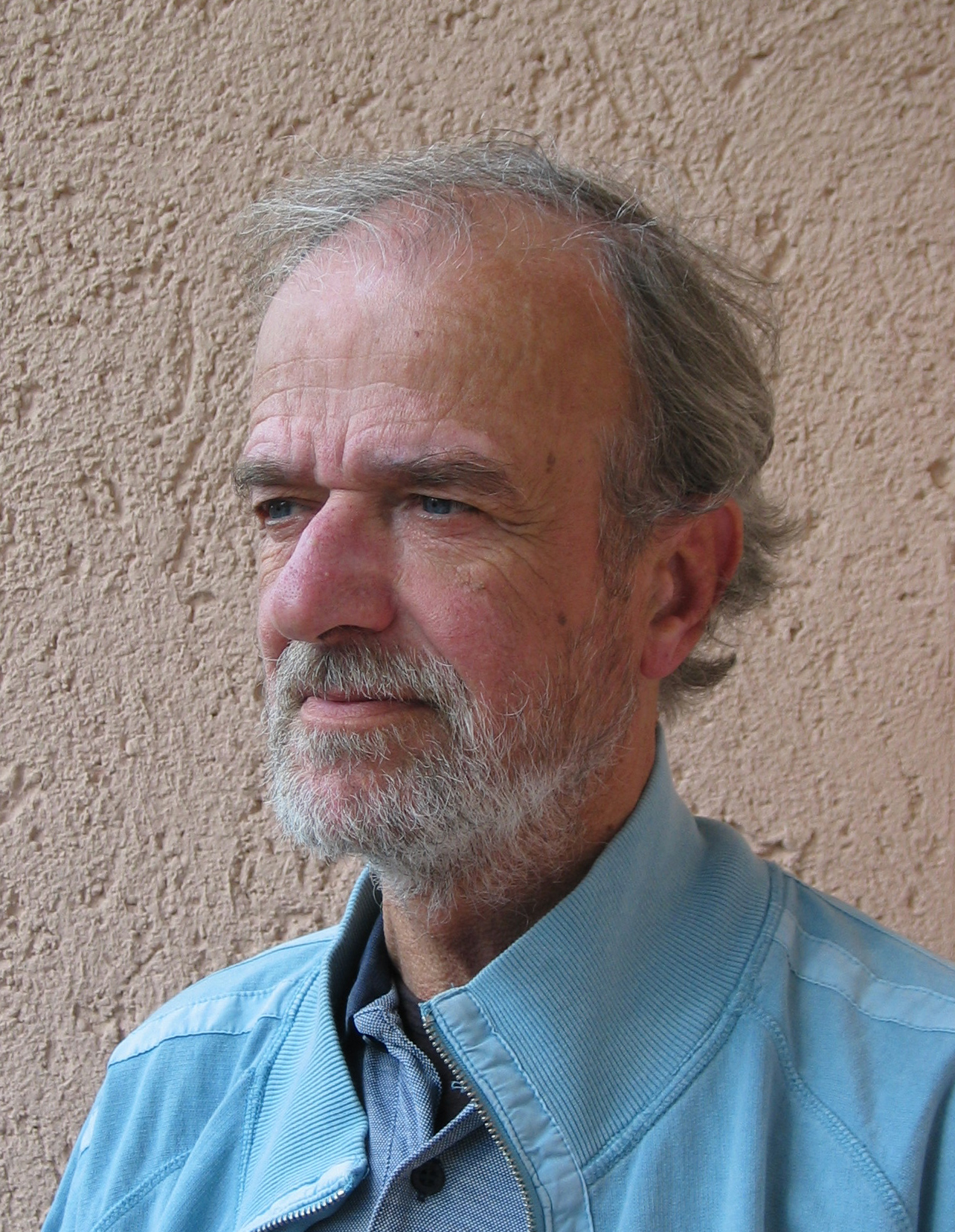
Giorgio Nottoli(2008)

Giorgio Nottoli (born 1945) is an Italian composer, musician and academic.

Born in Cesena in 1945 he completed his musical studies at the Conservatory "G. Rossini" in Pesaro.

He studied composition with Domenico Guaccero and Mario Bertoncini, guitar with Carmen Lenzi Mozzani and electronic music with Walter Branchi. Self-taught as a designer and researcher, has completed his apprenticeship in science, collaborating with various researchers, including Giuseppe di Giugno, Guido Guiducci and Silvio Santoboni. From 1968 he worked as a performer (lute and guitar) until 1975 and as a composer and researcher so far.

Since 1975, conducts research in the field of science and technology, in the field of acoustics and computer music.

== Teaching activities ==
He was professor of electronic music at the Conservatory of Frosinone "L.Refice" from 1974 until 2003.

He was Professor of Electronic Music at the Conservatory of Rome "Santa Cecilia" from 2004 until 2013. At this Institute from 2006 to 2013, he served continuously in charge of coordinating the Department's "New Technologies and Music". Always at the Conservatory in Rome, he was a member of the Academic Council from 2010 to 2013.

From 1999 to 2006 he was Professor of Electronic Music at the University of Rome "Tor Vergata". He has held this position for the Faculty of Arts, as part of the degree course in "History, Science and Techniques of Music and Performing Arts". Since 2007 he is professor of history, analysis and electroacoustic composition at the Second University of Rome "Tor Vergata" for the Faculty of Engineering as part of the "Master in Sonic Arts."

== Compositions ==
The major part of his works are realized by means of electro-acoustic media both for synthesis and processing of sound. The objective is to make timbre the main musical parameter and a "construction unit" through the control of sound microstructure. In the works for instruments and live electronics, the aim of Giorgio Nottoli is to extend the sonority of the acoustic instruments by means of complex real time sound processing.

The works from 1972 to 1978 are built by means of analog or hybrid equipment largely designed by the author, among them:

- Incontro (for tape and live electro-acoustic processing live, 1972)
- Ground I and II (for vibrating string and automatic control system, 1973)
- Senza Voci I and II (for magnetic tape, 1978, in collaboration with the composer Guido Baggiani)

The work made since 1980 are built by means of digital systems such as the WS-8 (designed by the author, 1978–79), among them:

- Figure (for soundtracks synthesized by computer, 1980)
- Grid (for soundtracks synthesized by digital techniques, 1986)

The works made since 1992 use as sound generator and processor the microchip ORION (designed by the author, 1988–90), among them:

- Tre Microaforismi (computer in real time, 1992)
- Iki (for soprano and computer, 1993, dedicated to Michiko Hirayama)
- Arco (computer in real time, 1994)
- Ruota del tempo (Wheel of Time) (for computer, 1996)
- ImprovvisazioneVII "by the sound of the concert just run" (for computer real-time systems and Saiph plus Mixtral, 1998)
- Archeion (for piano and computer in real time, 1995–2000)
- Solve et coagula (for computer) premiered at the Teatro alla Scala in Milan 15 January 2000.
- Seguendo un filo di luce (following a stream of light) (for computer 2002)
- Percorso Incrociato (for female voice, sound, electronic and electro-acoustic live processing, 2004) dedicated to Goffredo Petrassi and inspired by the poetry of Eugenio Montale's "La casa dei doganieri".
- Percorso inverso (for female voice and electronic sounds, 2004) dedicated to Agostino Ziino and inspired by Petrarch's sonnet "Solo e pensoso".
- In Viola (for viola and live electronics, 2006)
- Risonante notturno (for piano and live electronics, 2006 )
- Orizzonte (for female voice and live electronics, 2006)
- RING (for violin, wind quartet, percussion ensemble and live electronics, 2008)
- Messa in scena sonora I the Jerusalem Delivered (for voice, lute and live electronics, 2008)
- Messa in scena sonora II Alda Merino and Eugenio Montale (for two speakers and live electronics, 2009)
- Ricercare (for female voice, coordinated projection of images by Guido Strazza and electronics, video developed by Arianna D'Agata, 2009)
- Improvviso dinamico (for saxophone alto and live electronics, 2010)
- Weaves relief (Acousmatic, for sound synthesis, 2010) Specchi risonanti (Electric viola and live electronics, 2011)
- Ordito polifonico (Acousmatic, for sound synthesis, 2011)
- Traiettoria tesa (For flute and live electronics, 2012)
- Trama filante (For soprano saxophone and sounds of support, 2012)
- Trama risonante (Acousmatic for synthetic sounds and concrete, 2012)
- Intreccio Policromo (Piano, gongs and live electronics, 2013)
- Ellenikà (Acousmatic, for field recordings, 2013)
- Alto (For alto voice, alto flute, saxophone, viola and live electronics, 2014)
- Cometa (for Gong and live electronics, 2014)
- Trama lucente (flute and electronics, 2015)
- 7Isole (flute, percussion and live electronics, 2015)

== Performing ==
His works have been performed at national and international events including:

- the Teatro alla Scala (Milan) 2000
- The Music Workshop (Milan) 2002
- Music Weeks Academy Chigiana 1996
- Festival of New Consonance (Rome) 2007
- Music Festival Portrait (Rome) from 1979 to 2006
- the Estate Romana (Rome)
- American Academy of Rome 2006
- the concert season at the University of Rome "Tor Vergata", 2004
- Festival Syntèse (Bourges) 2006
- ICMC (International Computer Music Conference) 2005
- MIPCM (Malta International Project in Computer Music) 1997
- Goethe Institut Rom 2006 Teatro Massimo (Palermo) 2003
- Festival SonoImagenes 2007 (Buenos Aires)
- EMUfest S.Cecilia 2008-9-10-11-12-13 (Rome)
- Sconfinarte Festival 2009 (Teatro Dal Verme, Milan, Italy)
- Festival Musicacoustica 2009 (Beijing)
- Phonos Festival 2009 (Barcelona)
- Hochschule für Musik Hanns Eisler Berlin, 2010
- Meeting / concert Compose electronic music today 2010-11-12-13 (Milan)
- Monaco Electroacoutique 2011-2012-2013 (Principality of Monaco)
- Forme del suono 2012–2014 (Conservatory of Latina)
- NYCEMF (New York City Electroacoustic Music Festival) 2015
- Chigiana International Festival & Summer Academy 2025 (Siena)

== Researches ==
As part of the researcher Giorgio Nottoli has designed and implemented numerous systems for the synthesis and processing of sound using various technologies, from analog circuits to the design of digital integrated circuits specific to utilize music, among them:

WS-8 (synthesizer waveform varying in time, 1977).

ASF (Audio Synthesis Family: set of 3 chips for additive synthesis and frequency modulation, 1984–87, together with Francesco Galante, produced by Texas Instruments in 1985–87).

ORION (1988–90): A system for the synthesis / sound integrated on a single chip than 200,000 transistors based on highly parallel architecture fully microprogrammable (made by Sierra Semiconductor in 1990).

Mixtral (1996–97) for audio, geared specifically to the applications of mixing desks, effect processing, and sound spatialization in partnership with Charlie Lab of Mantua.

From 1997 to 2004 he coordinated, together with Prof. Mario Salerno and Prof. Giovanni Costantini, the design of the experimental system for the synthesis and sound processing circuits Saiph at the Laboratory of the Faculty of Engineering of the University of Rome"Tor Vergata".

In the first decade of 2000, has designed and developed three technology VST and AU plug-ins:

Synth4A, software simulation of the famous 4A system designed by Giuseppe di Giugno (IRCAM 1977). Made for educational purposes has also been used in the production of electronic and electro-acoustic compositions).

CharlieVerb, reverberation unit that has innovative features such as architecture and management of the control parameters. Designed for the professional audio industry segment, was used in the creation of numerous electronic and electro-acoustic compositions by many composers.

Texture, synthesizer-based "granulation of the spectral range." Designed by Prof. Nottoli, was developed in collaboration with the Faculty of Engineering of the University of Rome "Tor Vergata". The plugin Texture has been presented at numerous conferences both nationally and internationally. Aspects of technical / scientific and music of these systems have been presented in exhibitions and conferences including: ICMC (International Computer Music Conference), AES (Audio Engineering Society) Convention, JIM (Journées d'Informatique Musicale), CIM (Conference Computer Music), "Understanding and creating music" (Faculty of Mathematics of the Second University of Naples).

In 1977, he received a fellowship from the National Research Council on the implementation of a system-oriented computer-aided electronic music composition. This appointment was extended for four years, until 1981, was carried out at the group of Electroacoustic and Environmental Acoustics Institute of Acoustics "OMCorbino", CNR, Rome, directed by prof. Paolo Giua.

In 1983 he founded, together with other musicians and researchers, SIM Srl (Society for Computer Music) in Rome, of which he was president until 1989.

From 1990 to 1992 he coordinated the Laboratory of Research and Development of the company ORLA spa (Recanati) developing the application phase of the microchip Orion Rigel and designing the operating system, software architecture dedicated to real-time control systems for the synthesis sound.

From 1993 to 1995 he collaborated with the institute IRIS (Institute for Research for Industry and the Performing Arts) Paliano for whom he carried out research and coordination in the design of advanced electronic systems for computer music. Since 1996 he has collaborated with various research and development which has developed various systems and algorithms for the processing of audio signals. During the early stages of research, design and development of methods and algorithms related to systems for computer music has collaborated with the following universities:

Faculty of Electrical Engineering of the First University of Rome "La Sapienza" University, Faculty of Mathematics, Second University of Rome "Tor Vergata", Department of Physics of the First University of Rome. "La Sapienza", Faculty of Electrical Engineering of the Second University of Rome "Tor Vergata", Faculty of Electrical Engineering of the University of Ancona. Faculty of Arts of the Second University of Rome "Tor Vergata", Faculty of Mathematics, Second University of Naples.

As part of these collaborations followed numerous dissertations and as co-rapporteur. Over ten Thesis in Electrical Engineering had as its object the results of research and development produced by the same Prof. Nottoli.

In 1996, he held, along with Richardo Santoboni the course in electronic music at the 'Accademia Chigiana di Siena.

== EMUFest ==
In 2007–2008, he created EMUfest "International Festival of Electroacoustic Music at the Conservatory of Santa Cecilia" and, from 2008 to 2013, he coordinated the creation of the first six editions of the event, which consists of over 16 concerts with over 100 performances for Each edition.

== Discography ==
- In 1989 "Fonit Cetra" published the first Italian CD dedicated to computer music by the title "Computer music concerto" in which is inscribed the composition "Grid" of Giorgio Nottoli along with works by other authors.
- In 2003 Limen public 2 DVD video entitled "Metafonie 50 anni di musica elettronica" in which is inscribed the composition "Solve et coagula" of Giorgio Nottoli along with works by other authors.
- In 2004, the 21st musical series dedicated a monograph entitled: Giorgio Nottoli, "Il pensiero elettronico" The album, which contains nine selected works from 1973 to 2002, is distributed by EMI and produced in collaboration with RAI Radio.
- In 2014 The saxophonist Laura Venditti publishes an audio CD entitled "ELECTROSAX" in which is inscribed the composition "Trama Filante" of Giorgio Nottoli along with works by other authors.
- In 2014 Limen public an audio CD entitled "Le forme elettroacustiche", in collaboration with the "gli amici di musica e realtà" association, which is engraved the Ellenikà composition of Giorgio Nottoli along with works by other authors.
- In 2015 the 21st musical series public two audio CD single entitled "Traiettoria tesa" and "Inrtreccio policromo".
