= Patrick Ascione =

French composer (1953–2014)

Patrick Ascione (Paris, France, 22 October 1953 - Calvados, France, 21 November 2014) was a French composer of electroacoustic and acousmatic music.

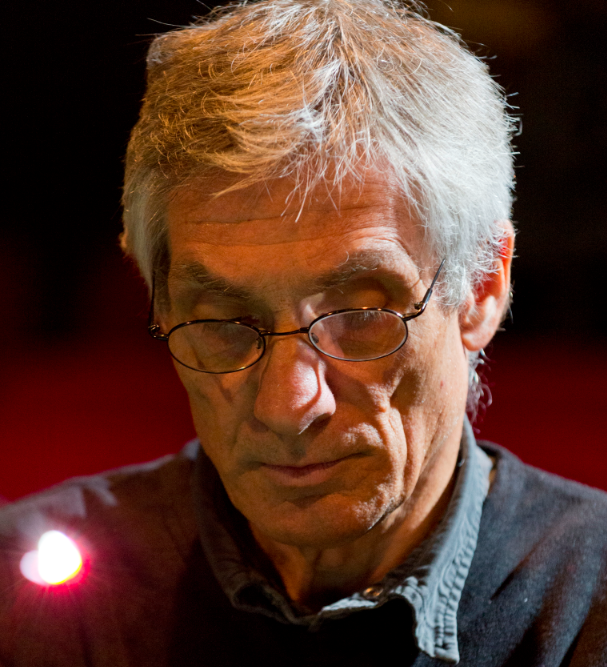
Patrick Ascione, janvier 2014, Auditorium St-Germain, Paris. Photo : Didier Allard ©Ina

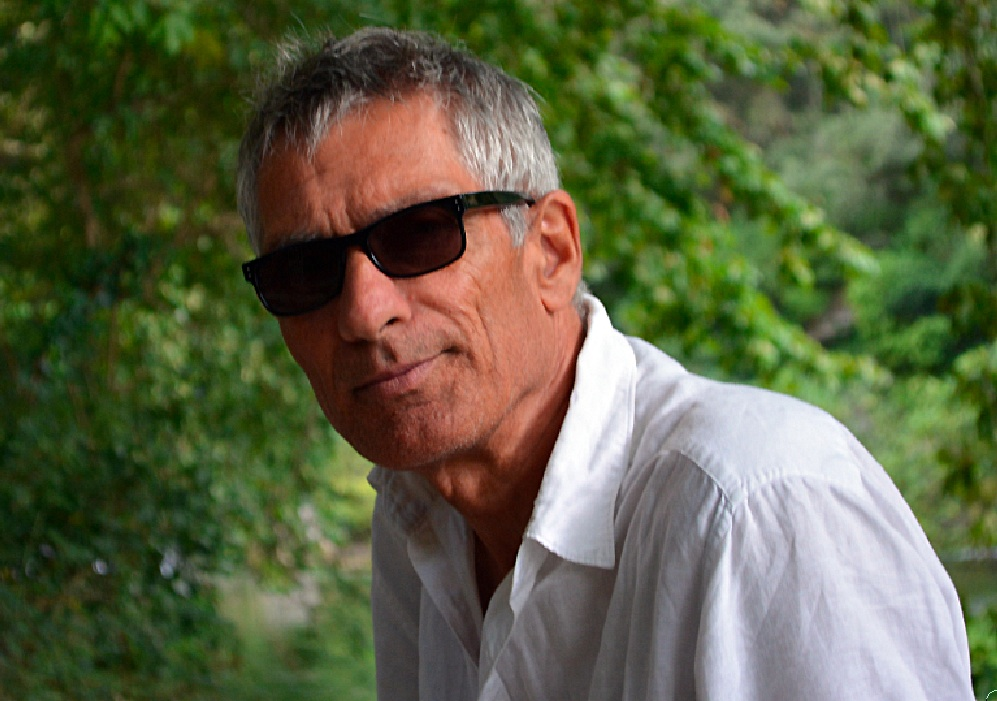
Patrick Ascione, 2014. Photo Gaspard Ascione

== Biography ==
Patrick Ascione (Paris, France, 1953) began composing in 1976 and shortly after joined the team of the Institut International de Musique Electroacoustique de Bourges (IMEB, France) which he left in 1984. At the same time he started composition by computer at IRCAM (Research institute and coordination acoustics / music). He has pursued his activities independently and has produced a series of pieces, the majority of which have been commissions from the Groupe de recherches musicales of the Institut national de l'audiovisuel (Ina-GRM) in Paris (France).

He taught acousmatic composition at the Conservatoire of La Rochelle, a course of electroacoustic music composition at the Conservatoire of Cherbourg in 2003 by means of the DRAC Basse-Normandie, and was active as an instructor in the CeFEDeM in Normandy. He participated on international juries for acousmatic composition competitions in France and abroad.

Two distinct esthetic periods characterized his work. During the first, from 1977 to 1987, he placed an emphasis on the ties unifying acousmatic music and painting, ties arising from the use of a common permanent working surface which permitted the painter to directly place his colors on the canvas in the way the composer immediately captures sonorities on 'magnetic tape'. He expressed this analogy and attempted to explore its ramifications in virtually all the works of this period (Métamorphose d’un jaune citron, 1978, Bleus et formes, 1981...).

In the second period, from 1987 to the present, following upon this initial preoccupation, he presented the idea of a ‘spatial polyphony’ (a ‘polyphony’ of spaces and not uniquely of sounds). He inaugurated this path in 1989 with Espaces-paradoxes, composed for 16 channels of speakers. The concert works thus developed have as their objective the mastering and integration of the spatial dimension of the piece from the very beginning of its elaboration in the studio via adequate multi-speaker techniques.

A number of his pieces have been awarded prizes and mentions in international competitions: Fontaines (La Défense/SACEM, France, 1978); Métamorphose d’un jaune citron (Bourges, France, 1979); Lune noire (Noroit-Léonce Petitot, France, 1989); Espaces-Paradoxes, (Ars Electronica, Linz, Austria, 1994). He was also a recipient of the ‘Léonard de Vinci Prize’ for Canada from the French Minister of Foreign Affairs (1991).

== Recordings ==
- Métamorphose d'un jaune citron (Cinéma pour l'oreille, MKCD 014, France, 1995)
- Polyphonie-polychrome (empreintes DIGITALes / INA-GRM, IMED 9522, 1995)
- Primitive; Espaces-Paradoxes (Ina-GRM, INA_E 5012, France, 2002)

== Compilations ==
- "Lune Noire" Prix International Léonce Petitot' (Coproduction Centre Noroit d'Arras et INA/GRM, France, 1989)
- "Métamorphose d'un jaune citron", (Cultures Électroniques, GMEB/CIME/UNESCO, France, 1996)
- "Primitive" 50 ans de Musique électroacoustique au GRM (Édition Teatro Massimo de Palerme, Italie, novembre 2001)
- "Lune Noire", A Storm of Drone (Asphodel, États-Unis, ASP 0966, 1995)
- "Divertissement" Cultures Électroniques (IMEB, France, 2003)
- "Primitive", in 50 ans de Musique électroacoustique au GRM (Édition Teatro Massimo de Palerme, Italie, novembre 2001)

== List of Works (stereo, multi-track) ==
- "Soleil Baroque" (1977)
- "Fontaines" (1978)
- "Guernica" (1978)
- "Métamorphose d'un Jaune Citron" (1978)
- "Bleus et Formes" (1980)
- "À la Mémoire" (1980)
- "Orlanda" (1981)
- "Sur Champ d'Azur" (1984–86)
- "Valeurs d'Ombre" (1986)
- "Sonnerie de Pâques" (1987)
- "Aquarelle en Sol" (1987)
- "Lune Noire" (1987–89)
- "Suite Blanche pour les Temps Nouveaux" (1995)
- "Cet extrême silence des couleurs" (1996)
- "Quantique Musique" (1997)
- "15 août 1995" (1996)
- "Et puis l'oubli" (1998)
- "Boléro Picasso" (1999)
- "Divertissement" (2001)
- "Espaces-Paradoxes" (1989) First electroacoustic music in 16 channels (of loudspeakers)
- "Arènes-Around" (1990) 16 channels
- "Chants Sphériques" (1991) 16 channels
- "Grands Ciels" (1991)
- "Couleurs d'espaces" (1993) 16 channels
- "Holophonie ou la baleine rouge" (1999–2000) 16 channels
- "Danse de l’Aube" (2000–2002) 8 & 16 channels
- "Énième" (2004) 8 channels
- "Barcarolle pour studio et bande" (2004) 8 real tracks
- "Figures de style" (suite of 5 « Ascionerie ») :
- "Ascionerie n°1" (2006) 8 channels
- "Ascionerie n°2" (2006) 8 channels
- "Ascionerie n°3" (2007) 8 & 16 channels
- "Ascionerie n°4" (2002–2007) 8 channels
- "Ascionerie n°5" (2009) 8 & 16 channels
- "Fantaisie diabolique" (2012) 8 & 16 channels
- "Opéra Diabolique" (2014) 8 & 16 channels
