= Lars-Gunnar Bodin =

Swedish composer (1935–2021)

Lars-Gunnar Bodin (15 July 1935 – 10 May 2021) was a Swedish pioneer in the field of electronic music during the 1960s, especially in the Scandinavian scene.

== Education and early career ==
Bodin was born in Stockholm, and studied classical music and traditional compositions under Lennart Wenström. Bodin joined the art group Fylkingen in 1962. With growing notoriety, Bodin made a point to increase the interest in Swedish artistic electronic music. In 1967, Bodin and his friend Bengt-Emil Johnson directed the Stockholm festivals of text-sound composition. In 1969, Bodin was appointed the chairman of Fylkingen, a position he held until 1972. He visited the United States as a Composer in Residence at Mills College, California, in 1972. In 1979 Bodin was made Director of the Electronic Music Studio (EMS) in Stockholm, and he was a prime mover in its transfer from Kungsgatan 8 to new, purpose-designed facilities in the Munich Brewery on Södermalm.

== Death ==
On 10 May 2021, Bodin died in his home in Gnesta, surrounded by friends and loved ones.

== Works ==
Two of Bodin’s most famous works are "Clouds" LP and "En Face". In Bodin’s work he has devoted himself to many different fields of contemporary music: instrumental theatre, text-sound composition, multi-media works and interaction between instrumentalists and tape recordings. The encounter between language and music has inspired him with several works, and his compositions frequently include phonetic elements. Concern for detail is one aspect of his working methods which is frequently mentioned by his colleagues. This concentration on the micro level does not impede him from building up large-scale, block-like, multi-layer processes.
