= Joy H. Calico =

Academic background
- Education: Baylor University; University of Illinois; Duke University

Academic work
- Discipline: musicology
- Institutions: UCLA Herb Alpert School of Music
- Notable works: Brecht at the Opera

Joy Haslam Calico is an American musicologist, and Professor of Musicology at the UCLA Herb Alpert School of Music.

== Life ==
She graduated from Baylor University, University of Illinois, and Duke University. She was a Frederick Burkhardt Residential Fellow at Radcliffe Institute for Advanced Study.

== Works ==
- Brecht at the Opera (California, 2008) ISBN 9780520254824
- Schoenberg's 'A Survivor from Warsaw' in Postwar Europe (California, 2014) ISBN 9780520281868
