= Passepartout Duo =

Musical group

- Years active: 2015-current
- Members: Nicoletta Favari; Christopher Salvito
- Website: passepartoutduo.com

Passepartout Duo is a contemporary music duo composed of pianist Nicoletta Favari and percussionist Christopher Salvito. The group has been active since 2015, and has performed at music festivals for contemporary classical music like Huddersfield Contemporary Music Festival, Norfolk Chamber Music Festival, Dark Music Days Festival, and Havana Festival of Contemporary Music.

They have programmed works by and collaborated with composers such as Lansing McLoskey, Hafdís Bjarnadóttir, Hannah Lash, Wally Gunn, Andy Akiho, Kaj Duncan David, Bryan Jacobs, Florent Ghys, Christopher Adler, and Mayke Nas.

== Artist Residencies ==
Passepartout Duo's work is related in part to their participation in a number of artist in residence programs.

- The Banff Centre
- La Casa del Herrero
- Hill & Hollow Music
- Eckerö Mail and Customs House
- Fiskars Artist in Residence
- Kammari Residency
- Kunstort ELEVEN artspace
- RaumArs Artist in Residence
- De Grote Post
- The Studios of Key West
- The Embassy of Foreign Artists

== Selected Works Commissioned ==
- Molly Joyce: Less is More (2017)
- Lansing McLoskey: This Will Not Be Loud and Relentless (2017)
- Molly Joyce: Cypher (2018)
- Hafdís Bjarnadóttir: A Northern Year (2018)
- Marta Forsberg: Gentle Acts (2018)

== Discography ==
- Ólafsfjörður (2018)
- A Northern Year (2019)
