= Arthur Levering =

American classical composer

Arthur Levering (born March 6, 1953) is an American composer of contemporary classical music. He lives in Cambridge, Massachusetts, USA.

Levering has received commissions from the Boston Modern Orchestra Project, Boston Musica Viva, the Dinosaur Annex Music Ensemble, the New Juilliard Ensemble, the Rascher Saxophone Quartet, and Sequitur, among others.

== Early life ==
Levering was born in Baltimore, Maryland. He holds a B.A. from Colby College (1976); an M.M. in performance from Yale University (1979), having studied classical guitar with Eliot Fisk; and an M.M. in composition from Boston University (1988), having studied primarily with Bernard Rands.

== Awards ==
- 2010 Fromm Music Foundation at Harvard commission
- 2002 Guggenheim Foundation Fellowship
- 1997 Rome Prize in music composition (FAAR)
- 1997 Heckscher Foundation Composition Prize
- 1996 Barlow Endowment commission
- 1994 National Endowment for the Arts commission
- 1992 Lee Ettelson Composer's Award (Composers Inc.)
- 1990 Composer's Guild prize
- MacDowell Colony fellow (six times)
- Yaddo residency

== Major Compositions, selected performances ==
His virtuosic 3 movement piano work, School of Velocity, was commissioned and performed by Donald Berman on a League of Composers/ISCM concert at Merkin Hall, New York on March 23, 1999. Echoi (violin and piano) was premiered by Nicholas Kitchen and Donald Berman in Boston on Oct. 20, 2003. Clarion/Shadowing (clarinet, violin, piano) was performed by the 21st Century Consort at the Hirshhorn Museum in Washington, DC on March 13, 2004. Twenty Ways Upon the Bells (7 players) was premiered by Dinosaur Annex in Boston on Oct. 30, 1994. Cloches II (8 players) was performed by the Chamber Music Society of Lincoln Center on Feb. 15, 2001. Furies (11 players) was premiered by Sequitur at Merkin Hall in New York on Jan. 30, 2008. Catena (piano and 16 players) was premiered by Donald Berman and the Dinosaur Annex Chamber Orchestra, conducted by Scott Wheeler at Jordan Hall, Boston on Sept. 16, 2000. Parallel Universe (string orchestra) was performed and recorded by the Boston Modern Orchestra Project at Jordan Hall, Boston on May 25, 2007. Il Mare Dentro (orchestra) was commissioned and premiered by the Boston Modern Orchestra Project at the Institute of Contemporary Art, Boston on September 21, 2008.

== Recordings ==
- School of Velocity (CRI 812, 1999, NWCR812, 2007) includes: Twenty Ways Upon the Bells, Clarion/Shadowing, School of Velocity, Roulade, Uncle Inferno, Cloches II.
- Still Raining, Still Dreaming (New World 80662-2, 2008) includes: Still Raining Still Dreaming, Echoi, Sppooo, Tesserae, Catena.
- Americans in Rome, Music by Fellows of the American Academy in Rome (Bridge 9271 A/D, 2008) includes: Tesserae.
- Parallel Universe (New World 80750, 2014) includes: Furies, Il Mare Dentro, Drinking Songs, Partite sopra Ciaccona, Parallel Universe.
- OceanRiverLake (New Focus FCR417, 2024) includes: OceanRiverLake, Giocattolo, Squeezebox, Garland for Steven Stucky.

== Sources ==
- Carl, Robert "Arthur Levering". Liner notes to Arthur Levering: Still Raining, Still Dreaming. New World Records.
- Wheeler, Scott "Arthur Levering". Liner notes to Arthur Levering: School of Velocity. New World/CRI.
