= Lois V. Vierk =

American composer (born 1951)

Lois V. Vierk (born August 4, 1951, in Hammond, Indiana) is a post-minimalist composer who lives in New York City.

She received a B.A. degree in piano and ethnomusicology from UCLA in 1974. She then attended Cal Arts, studying composition with Mel Powell, Leonard Stein, and Morton Subotnick, receiving her M.F.A. in 1978. She has conducted extensive study of gagaku music, studying for ten years with Suenobu Togi in Los Angeles, and for two years in Tokyo with Sukeyasu Shiba (the lead ryūteki player in Japan's Imperial Court Orchestra).

She has written many chamber works for different ensembles which are multiples of the same instrument. Her work uses glissando prominently and builds exponentially in level of activity. More recently she has written for mixed instrument ensembles, such as in her piece Timberline commissioned by the Relâche Ensemble, and Red Shift which appeared on the CD Bang on a Can Live Vol. 2. She has also composed for gagaku ensemble.

Vierk received a 1993 Foundation for Contemporary Arts Grants to Artists Award.

== Compositions ==
- Kana (1976) for 3 Tenor Voices and 3 Bass Voices
- Small Shadow in the Desert (1978) for 3 Clarinets
- 五 Guitars (Go Guitars) (1981) for 5 Electric Guitars
- TUSK (1981) for 18 Trombones
- Dark Bourne (1985) for 4 Bassoons and 4 Celli
- Manhattan Cascade (1985) for 4 Accordions
- Simoom (1986) for 8 Cellos
- Cirrus (1987) for 6 Trumpets
- Attack Cat Polka (1988) for Vocal Soloist, Accordion, Violin, Cello, Percussion
- Red Shift (1989) for cello, electric guitar, piano/synthesizer, percussion
- Jagged Mesa (1990) for 2 Trumpets, 2 Trombones, 2 Bass Trombones
- Yeah, Yeah, Yeah (1990) for Piano
- Timberline (1991) for Flute, Clarinet, Bassoon, Viola, String Bass, Piano/Synthesizer, Percussion
- Devil's Punchbowl (1993) for Orchestra
- Hexa (1993) with Anita Feldman, for Solo Tap Dancer on Tap Dance Instrument (patented); Cello and Marimba
- River Beneath the River (1993) for String Quartet
- Into the Brightening Air (1994) for String Quartet
- To Stare Astonished at the Sea (1994) for string piano (played entirely inside the piano)
- Swash (1994) with Anita Feldman, for 2 Tap Dances and 2 Singers (High Voice)
- Spin 2 (1995) for 2 Pianos
- Blue Jets Red Sprites (1996) for Accordion
- Demon Star (1996) for Cello and Marimba
- Silversword (1996) for Gagaku Orchestra
- Io (1998) for Amplified Flute, Amplified Marimba, and Electric Guitar
- Words Fail Me (2005) for Cello and Piano

== Discography ==
=== River Beneath the River ===
River Beneath the River

Studio album by Lois V Vierk
- Released: April 25, 2000
- Genres: Totalist, Experimental
- Length: 72:33
- Label: Tzadik Records
- Producers: Gregory Hesselink, Scott Lehrer, and Lois V Vierk

Lois V Vierk chronology
Simoom (1990)	''River Beneath the River'' (2000)

Professional ratings
Review scores
Source	Rating
Allmusic	link

River Beneath the River was released in 2000. The album contains music written over a ten-year span including the title track originally commissioned by Kronos Quartet though not played by them. The liner notes were written by Robert Carl. Track listing:

1. River Beneath the River – 14:13 - Eva Greusser (violin), Patricia Davis (violin), Lois Martin (viola), Bruce Wang (cello); commissioned by the Barbican Centre for Kronos Quartet
2. Into the Brightening Air – 24:15 - Eva Greusser (violin), Patricia Davis (violin), Lois Martin (viola), Bruce Wang (cello); commissioned by Karen Bamonte Danceworks with support from Meet the Composer
3. Jagged Mesa – 21:349 - Gary Trosclair (trumpet), Bruce Eidem (trombone), Christopher Banks (bass trombone); commissioned by Risa Jaroslaw & Dancers with support from Meet the Composer
4. Red Shift – 12:16 - Ted Mook (cello), David Seidel (electric guitar), Jim Pugliese (percussion), Lois V Vierk (synthesizer); commissioned by Experimental Intermedia with support from the Mary Flagler Cary Charitable Trust

=== Simoom ===
Simoom

Studio album by Lois V Vierk
- Released: 1990
- Recorded: Emerald City Studios, San Francisco, 1988
- Genres: Totalist, Experimental
- Length: 52:00
- Label: Experimental Intermedia
- Producer: Arther Stidfole

Lois V Vierk chronology
''Simoom'' (1990)	River Beneath the River (2000)

Professional ratings
Review scores
Source	Rating
Allmusic	4/5 stars

Simoom was released in 1990. The liner notes, written by Arthur Stidfole, contain a short introduction to the composer, descriptions of the compositions, and biographical information on the performers. Track listing:

1. 五 Guitars (Go Guitars) for 5 electric guitars; David Seidel (electric guitars) – 12:06
2. Cirrus for 6 trumpets; Gary Trosclair (trumpets) – 18:43
3. Simoom for 8 cellos; Theodore Mook (cellos) – 20:34

== Films ==
- New York Composers: Searching for a New Music (1997). Directed by Michael Blackwood. Produced by Michael Blackwood Productions, in association with Westdeutscher Rundfunk.
