= Composers in Red Sneakers =

American composers collective

Promotional postcard advertising a 1983 concert by Composers in Red Sneakers

Composers in Red Sneakers was a Boston-based composers collective founded in 1981 by Thomas Oboe Lee, Christopher Stowens, Robert Aldridge, Roger Bourland, Amy Reich, and Gary Philo. Concerts were given in the Old Cambridge Baptist Church and in Harvard University's Sanders Theatre. One of their early advocates was Richard Dyer, the music critic of The Boston Globe. The group appeared at Symphony Space in New York City in 1985 and produced an eponymous LP that same year. Their concerts were marked by an irreverent attitude including humorous, pre-recorded introductions and skits.

The consortium subsequently recruited many new composers including Richard Cornell, Herman Weiss, Jean Hasse, Michael Carnes, Lansing McLoskey, Margaret McAllister, Francine Trester, Howard Frazin, Thomas Schnauber, Delvyn Case, Ronald Bruce Smith, Ken Ueno, and Peter Van Zandt Lane. By 2010, Composers in Red Sneakers ceased operations.

== Sources ==
- Cleary, David, "The Boston New-Music Scene: Present and Recent Past, with Special Emphasis on Composers in Red Sneakers", 21st Century Music, June 2000, Volume 7, Number 6
- Holland, Bernard, "Review: Composers in Red Sneakers", The New York Times, 13 October 1985
- Page, Tim, "Numic Notes; Moderns in Red Sneakers", The New York Times, 6 October 1985.
- The Philadelphia Inquirer, "Bostonians Make Their Own Album", 23 June 1985, (subscription access)
