= Howard Frazin =

American composer (born 1962)

Howard Frazin (born 1962) is a composer based in Somerville, Massachusetts. His works are published by Edition Peters and he has served as president of Composers in Red Sneakers. He served on the faculty of the Longy School of Music and has taught at New England Conservatory, Northeastern University, and Roxbury Latin School.

== Life ==
Howard Frazin was raised in Lincolnwood, Illinois, and graduated from Niles West High School. He received a bachelor of arts in English from the University of Michigan in 1985 before beginning his formal musical training at the New England Conservatory, where he studied between 1984 and 1989. In 1994, he earned a master of arts in music composition from the University of Minnesota, where he studied with Dominick Argento. Frazin subsequently settled in Massachusetts, living in Cambridge and Somerville.

== Music ==
Frazin's music is for the most part recognizably tonal, described by New Music Connoisseur as inhabiting "a slightly clouded tonal world that ably weds aspects of Leonard Bernstein and Olivier Messiaen."

Among his most noted works is the oratorio, The Voice of Isaac, commissioned by PALS Children's Chorus and published by Edition Peters. The piece is a retelling of the Biblical story of the Binding of Isaac from Isaac's perspective, scored for chorus, soloists, and chamber orchestra. Writing in The Boston Globe after its March 2003 premiere at Jordan Hall, the critic Richard Dyer described it as "clear in design and Brittenesque in texture," going on to note, "in the children's voices, the story took on an almost unbearable poignancy."

In March 2007, Frazin's Theme and Reverberations for Two Tubas and Orchestra was premiered at Boston's Faneuil Hall. It was performed by the Boston Classical Orchestra, under Steven Lipsitt. The tuba soloists were Boston Symphony principal Mike Roylance and pediatrician/jazz musician Eli Newberger. The Boston Classical Orchestra later premiered Frazin's overture for orchestra, In the Forests of the Night in 2009, based on William Blake's Poem The Tyger, which had previously inspired Frazin's song for voice and piano The Tyger.

Frazin's works have been performed throughout the United States, Canada, France, and Russia, including festivals at Aspen, the Banff Centre for the Arts, the Gamper Contemporary Music Festival, Yellow Barn Summer Music Festival, the Janus 21 Ensemble Summer Series, the Composers' Forum of New York, the Society of Composers National Conference, and elsewhere.

== Career ==
In 1991, Frazin joined the composition faculty of the Longy School of Music, where he continued to teach until 2009. His works were regularly featured on the school's SeptemberFest, including Amid a Crowd of Stars for baritone and orchestra, which inaugurated the reopening of Pickman Hall after extensive renovations. While at Longy, Frazin founded a composition class for undergraduate and graduate performance majors and founded and directed a young performers composition program in the school's preparatory program. Since 2009, Frazin has taught at the New England Conservatory, Northeastern University, and Roxbury Latin School.

From 2002 until 2007, Frazin was president of Composers in Red Sneakers, a Boston-area composer's collective. In 2008 he co-founded WordSong, an organization that commissions new art songs from multiple composers all set to the same text, and presents them in an intimate, discussion-based setting.
