= Ezra Sims =

American classical composer

Ezra Sims (January 16, 1928 in Birmingham, Alabama — January 30, 2015 in Boston, Massachusetts) was one of the pioneers in the field of microtonal composition. He invented a system of notation that was adopted by many microtonal composers after him, including Joseph Maneri.

His professional debut (12 note ET music) occurred on a Composers Forum program in New York, 1959. In 1960, compelled by his ear, he began writing microtonal music, and continued to do so for the rest of his life, with the occasional exception being taped music for dancers. His last composition in quarter tones (his sixth microtonal one) was his Third Quartet (1962). Since 1971, whatever music he has composed that is not purely electronic has employed a system of asymmetrical modes of 18 pitches per octave, drawn from a 72-note division of the octave.

I seem finally to have identified and made transcribable what my ear was after all along: a set of pitches ordered in an asymmetrical scale of 18 (or 19) notes, some of them acoustically more important than others, transposable through a chromatic of 72 pitches in the octave.

He has received a Guggenheim Fellowship, a Koussevitsky commission, and an American Academy of Arts & Letters Award, as well as numerous commissions from organizations like the Arizona Friends of Chamber Music and private individuals. He was a co-founder of the Dinosaur Annex Music Ensemble, with Rodney Lister and Scott Wheeler, for which he served as president from 1977 to 1981 and as a member of the Board of Directors from 1981 to 2003.

He has lectured on his music in the US and abroad, most notably at the Hamburger Musikgespräch, 1994; the second Naturton Symposium in Heidelberg, 1992; and the 3rd and 4th Symposium, Mikrotöne und Ekmelische Musik, at the Hochschüle für Musik und Darstellende Kunst Mozarteum, Salzburg, in 1989 & 1991. In 1992–93, he was guest lecturer in the Richter Herf Institut für Musikalische Grundlagenforschung in the Mozarteum.

He has published articles on his technique in Computer Music Journal, Mikrotöne III, Mikrotöne IV, Perspectives of New Music, and Ex Tempore. With the American cellist Theodore Mook, he designed a font, now widely adopted, for use with computer printing programs, based on his set of accidentals, which are sufficient for 72-note music. His music is published by Frog Peak Music and Diapason Press (Corpus Microtonale).

As his award citation from the American Academy of Arts and Letters attests:

Ezra Sims has already contributed an outstanding body of works, many of which have explored with singular imagination, conviction and success the beautiful but elusive world of microtonal music.

== Discography ==
- Ezra Sims (1998). CRI American Masters CD 784. Originally released on CRIS SD 223 and CRI SD 377.
  - String Quartet No. 2 (1962) (1974) Boston Musica Viva
  - Elegie – nach Rilke (1976) Elsa Charlston & Boston Musica Viva
  - Third Quartet (1962) The Lenox Quartet
- CRI 643
  - Concert Piece (1990)
  - Night Piece: In Girum Imus Nocte et Consumimur Igni (1987)
  - Flight (1989)
  - Solo in four movements (1987)
  - Quintet (1987)
- Northeastern NR 224
  - Sextet (1981)
  - Two for One (1980)
  - All Done From Memory (1980)
  - -- and, as I was saying... (1979)
- CRI 578
  - Come Away (1978)
- Ezra Sims: Quintet, Night Piece, Solo in Four Movements, Flight, Concert Piece. Gisele Ben-Dor, conductor, Pro Arte Orchestra, Dinosaur Annex Members. Composers recordings, 1994.
