= Theodore Mook =

American cellist (born 1953)

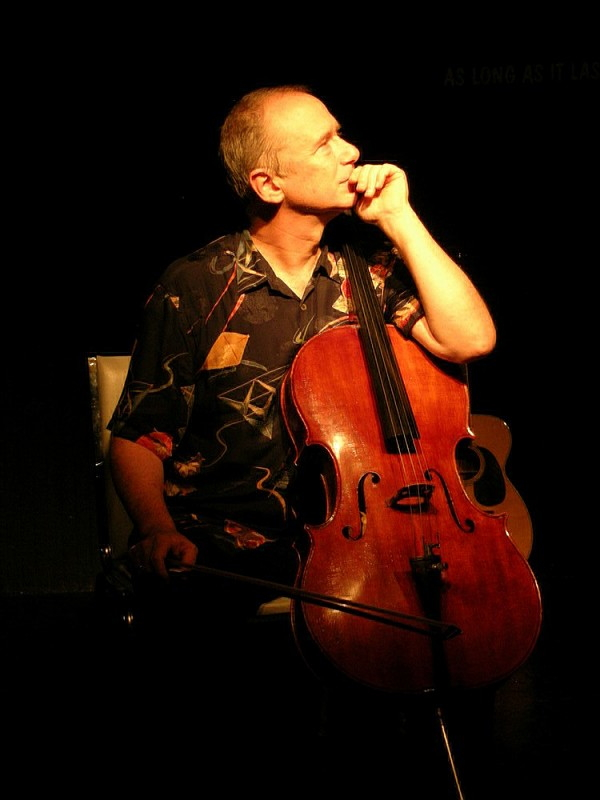
- Mook performing at Beyond Baroque in Los Angeles, with the tenor violin

Background information
- Born: February 26, 1953 Mount Kisco, New York, U.S.
- Genres: Classical
- Occupation: Musician
- Instrument(s): Cello, Tenor Violin
- Years active: 1980–present
- Labels: New World Records, Mode, Tzadik, ECM

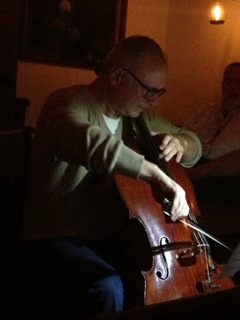
Theodore Mook performing at Star Island

Theodore Mook (born February 26, 1953, Mount Kisco, New York) is an American cellist who has played in more than 1,000 Broadway performances in New York City, produced records, played on motion picture soundtracks and, along with Ezra Sims, invented computer fonts used in microtonal music composition. He is best known for his interest and contributions to microtonality music.

Mook began his music career in Boston, Massachusetts after graduating Boston University. He was a member of Dinosaur Annex Music Ensemble and played with other ensembles in the area before relocating to New York City in 1983. In New York, Mook performed cello in Broadway shows Little Women, Bombay Dreams, Taboo and Jekyll & Hyde. He also played with the New York Consortium for New Music, at the Metropolitan Museum of Art, The Lincoln Center for the Performing Arts and at other venues around the city.

Outside of New York City, Mook has performed at the Library of Congress, the American Academy in Rome, the Los Angeles County Museum of Art and John F. Kennedy Center for the Performing Arts, among other venues. He performed cello for the soundtracks for the Wendigo (film) and Space Cowboys.

After moving to Charlestown, Rhode Island, Mook played alongside Grammy-winning artist Eugene Friesen.

== Discography ==
Year	Album	Credit
1985	All Done From Memory	Cello
1985	Music For String Quartet And Synthesizer	Cello
1985	Lost in the Stars: The Music of Kurt Weill	Cello
1989	Entelechron: Time + Memory	Producer
1989	Bach, Handel, Telemann: Trio Sonatas on Period Instruments	Assistant Engineer
1989	Vivaldi: The Miraculous Mandolin	Cello
1992	Entelechron: Time + MemoryLois V. Vierk: Simoom	Celli
1992	Big Noise from Nicaragua	Cello
1993	Sims: Concert Piece; Night Piece	Cello
1993	Greatest Hits for String Quartet	Cello
1993	Keith Jarrett: Bridge Of Light & Other Works	Cello
1993	Chopin: The Complete Piano Works, Vol. 4 - Scherzi & Variations	Assistant Engineer
1993	Bang on a Can Live, Vol. 2	Cello
1993	The Microtonal Music Of Ezra Sims	Cello
1994	Play Microtonal Works, Vol. 2	Cello, Gong, Gourd, Liner Notes, Producer
1994	Lee Hyla: In Double Light	Cello
1994	Bridge Of Light	Cello
1994	Play Microtonal Works	Gong
1995	Leo Ornstein: Nocturne for Clarinet and Piano; Erik Lundborg: Ghost Sonatine; Michael Dellaira: Maud; etc.	Cello
1995	17 Lyrics Of Li Po	Producer, Violin, Liner Notes
1995	Berio: The Great Works for Voice	Cello
1995	Realm of My Senses	Cello
1996	On the Tip of My Tongue: Music of Eric Moe	Producer
1996	Judith Lang Zaimont: Chamber Music	Cello
1996	Dance Of The Seven Veils	Cello
1996	And Trouble Came: Musical Responses to AIDS	Cello
1997	Karchin: Galactic Folds; Songs of Distance & Light; Ricercare; Sonata for Violoncello & Piano	Cello
1997	Jekyll & Hyde (Original Broadway Cast)	Cello, Orchestra
1997	Kraanerg	Cello
1997	Davies: Le Jongleur De Notre Dame/String Quartet	Cello
1997	Cézanne's Doubt	Cello
1998	Being And Time (Series)	Cello
1998	Leo Kraft: Spring in the Harbor	Cello
1998	Robert Savage: An Eye-Sky Symphony	Cello
1998	Scarlet Pimpernel (Original Broadway Cast)	Cello
1998	Ariadne Music	Cello
1999	Rosenblum: Ancient Eyes	Executive Producer, Liner Notes
1999	It's No Secret Anymore	Calliope, Cello
1999	Scarlet Pimpernel: Encore	Cello
2000	Music From The Motion Picture Space Cowboys	Cello
2000	River Beneath The River	Cello
2000	Another Rosie Christmas	Celli, Cello
2000	Christmas Stays the Same	Celli
2001	Hesher	Cello
2002	Wendigo (Original Motion Picture Soundtrack)	Cello
2002	Up & At 'Em: Chamber & Electroacoustic Music by Eric Moe	Producer
2004	Lee Hyla: Trans	Liner Notes
2004	All in Your Mind: Music of Julia Werntz and John Mallia	Cello
2005	Little Women: Original Broadway Cast Recording	Cello
2006	Le Temps D'Une Chanson	Cello
2006	The Great Works For Voice	Cello
2010	Musing And Reminiscence	Cello
2012	Annea Lockwood: In Our Name	Cello, Tape
2014	Lois V Vierk: Words Fail Me	Cello
