= UCLA Herb Alpert School of Music =

University of California, Los Angeles unit

The UCLA Herb Alpert School of Music
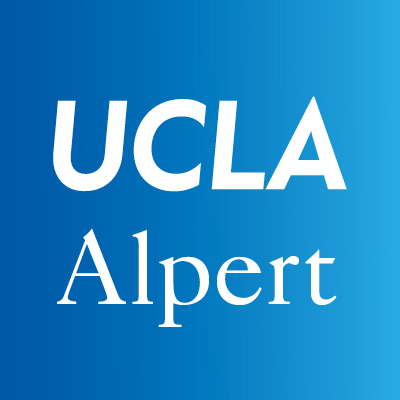
- UCLA Herb Alpert School of Music Logo
- Type: Public
- Established: 2007 as a unit of the UCLA School of the Arts and Architecture. 2016 as a standalone school.
- Parent institution: University of California, Los Angeles
- Endowment: $111 million
- Dean: Michael Beckerman
- Faculty: 156
- Students: 671
- Location: Los Angeles, CA, United States; 34.066792°N 118.443491°W
- Campus: Urban
- Website: schoolofmusic.ucla.edu

The UCLA Herb Alpert School of Music is the music school of the University of California, Los Angeles. It is the first, and only, school of music within the University of California system.

Established in 2007 within the UCLA School of Arts and Architecture and the UCLA Division of Humanities, the UC Board of Regents formally voted in January 2016 to establish the school. It is supported in part by a $30 million endowment from the Herb Alpert Foundation. Originally composed of the academic departments of ethnomusicology, musicology, and music, the school now supports interdisciplinary programs in global jazz studies and music industry.

Michael Beckerman was appointed the third dean of The UCLA Herb Alpert School of Music in 2025.

== History ==
With the creation in 1919 of an art gallery and music department, the UCLA leadership committed to offer the study of the arts in a liberal arts research university context. The College of Applied Arts was established in 1939 with the inclusion of an art department. In 1960, the college was renamed the College of Fine Arts, which carried departments of art, dance, music, and theater arts.

In 1988, several big changes occurred in departments throughout the school: Ethnomusicology and Musicology separated from Music, while Design and Art History separated from Art. Art History and Musicology entered the umbrella of the Humanities division of the college while Design and Ethnomusicology remained in Fine Arts.

Then in 1991, the College of Fine Arts was disestablished, giving rise to two separate schools: the School of the Arts and the School of Theater, Film and Television. With the conjoining of architecture to the School of Fine Arts in UCLA's Professional School Restructuring Initiative in 1994, the school was then renamed the School of the Arts and Architecture.

In 2014, a proposal was made for the creation of a School of Music for the college. The new school, called the Herb Alpert School of Music, created in 2016, would join the trio of “independent but complementary arts-centered” schools: the current School of Theater, Film, Television, a redefined School of the Arts and Architecture, and the new School of Music.

In 2020, UCLA announced the Herb Alpert School of Music would establish the Lowell Milken Center for Music of American Jewish Experience to support the research, scholarship and performance of American Jewish music.

The name Herb Alpert School of Music was approved by the Board of Regents after the acceptance of a donation of $30 million from the Herb Alpert Foundation in 2007.

In 2023, the Lowell Milken Center for Music of American Jewish Experience at The UCLA Herb Alpert School of Music organized a series of concerts and dialogues focused on race and social justice in the modern world. The series, which took place from February 26–28, 2023, centered around a historic performance of The Gates of Justice, jazz legend Dave Brubeck's rarely presented large-scale sacred composition. For the first time ever, Brubeck's sons performed as the accompanying jazz trio. The program also featured six recent and socially conscious works by contemporary composers, including six-time Grammy-winning pianist, composer, and music educator Arturo O'Farrill. In addition to the concerts, a daylong public conference on February 27 brought together prominent scholars and experts to discuss the historical and cultural connections between Black and Jewish communities in the United States, intimate analyses of Brubeck's Gates of Justice, and the contemporary relevance of music to social justice.

== Facilities ==
The entire school is housed in either the Schoenberg Music Building, established in 1955 and 1965, and the Evelyn and Mo Ostin Music Center, a pair of buildings completed in 2014.^{[5]}

=== Schoenberg Music Building ===
Named in honor of former UCLA faculty member and composer Arnold Schoenberg, this facility houses the Dean's office, administrative offices for the school's departments, most faculty offices, as well as two large theaters. Schoenberg Hall, which seats about 520, is the main auditorium of the Schoenberg building. Lani Hall is a 133-seat house intended mainly for small performance groups and lectures, although it has been used for many other types of events.”

Aside from the performance venues, Schoenberg Hall also contains the Henry Mancini Media Lab as well as the World Music Center. The World Music Center acts as a composing studio, recording studio, and a classroom. The World Music Center includes the Ethnomusicology Archive, the World Musical Instrument Collection, and is home to publications by the Ethnomusicology department. Additionally, the building contains a keyboard lab, a computer lab, six classrooms, 46 practice rooms, an orchestra room, a band room, a choral room, the headquarters office of the Herbie Hancock Institute of Jazz Performance at UCLA as well as the Music Library.

=== Evelyn and Mo Ostin Music Center ===
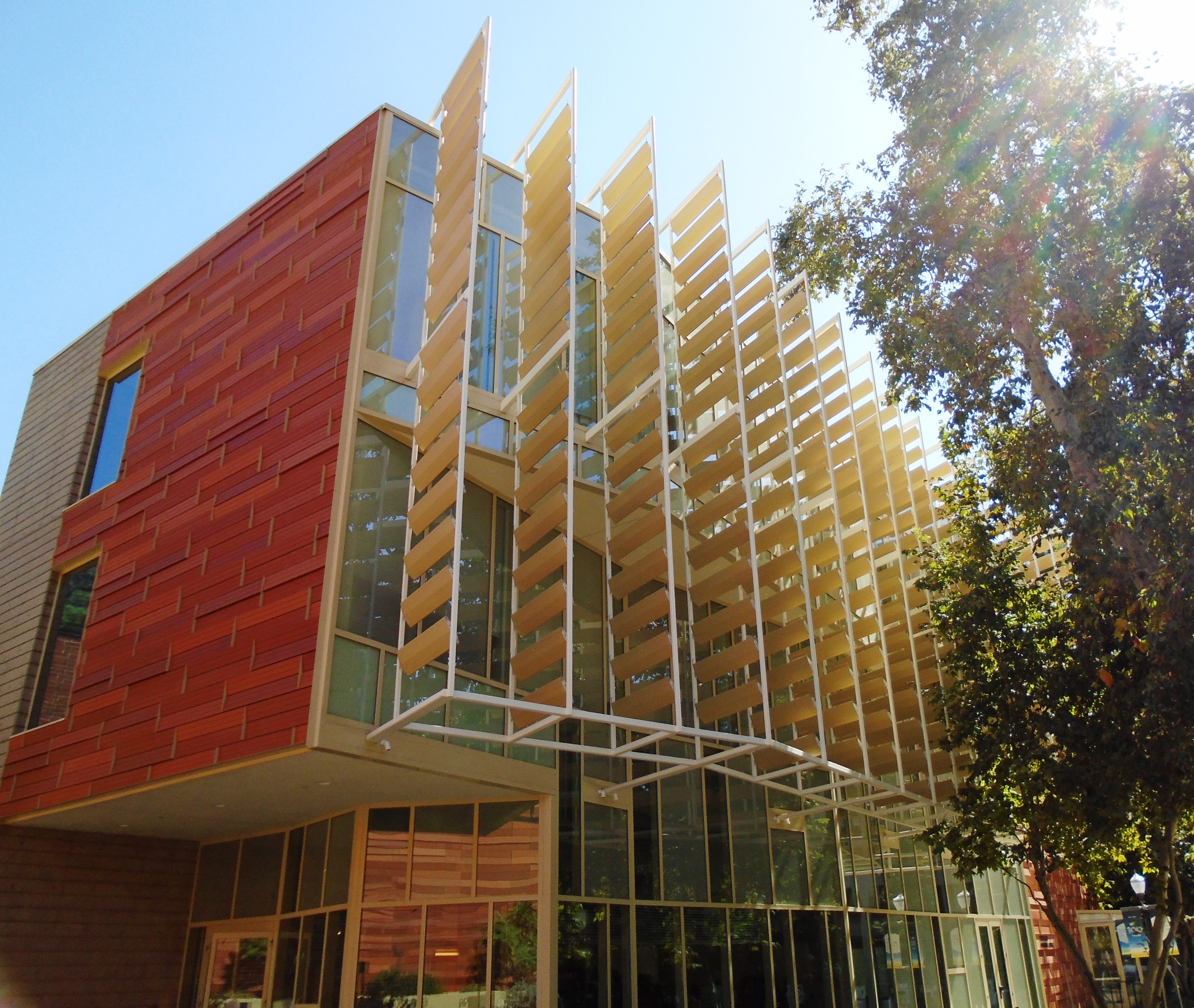
The Ostin Music Center at UCLA

The Evelyn and Mo Ostin Music Center, completed in 2014, “includes a high-tech recording studio, spaces for rehearsal and teaching, a café and social space for students, and an Internet-based music production center.”^{[10]} Paid for in part by a $10 million donation by Music Industry Executive and Philanthropist Morris “Mo” Ostin and his late wife, Evelyn Ostin, to his alma mater, the center was designed by LA-based architects Daly Genik Architects under the direction of principal Kevin Daly. The center was honored in 2016 at the 46th Annual Los Angeles Architectural Awards by Los Angeles Business Council.

== Ensembles ==
The Herb Alpert School of Music has 35 active ensembles that perform classical, contemporary, jazz, popular and world music. Under the direction of performance faculty, students also premiere new works, including those by established composers, students, faculty and alumni.

=== Chamber ensembles ===
Chamber ensembles at UCLA include Chamber Singers, Brass Ensemble, Camarades, Early Music Ensemble, FLUX Contemporary Ensemble, Guitar Ensemble, Percussion Ensemble, and Woodwind Chamber Ensembles.

=== World music ensembles ===
World music ensembles include the Afro-Latin Jazz Orchestra, Klezmer Music Ensemble, Mariachi de Uclatàn, Music of Bali, Music of China, Music of India, and many others.

== Sister institutes ==
=== Institute of Ethnomusicology ===
Founded in 1960, the Institute of Ethnomusicology was established under the supervision of Dr. Mantle Hood by UCLA Chancellor Gene D. Block. Mantle Hood brought to the program a belief that “ethnomusicology includes the musical practice, and "instrument" is interpreted in its literal meaning. Performance, under experienced leadership, is an integral part of the program at U.C.L.A.”^{[13]} The ethnomusicology student is taught practical training in the performance of various types of non-Western music. Since its founding the institute has hosted a large number of internationally-known master musicians and instructors from different world traditions; purchased an impressive collection of world musical instruments; the collection of traditional sound recordings for what is now one of the largest sound archives in the U.S.; supported scientific work in systematic musicology, particularly the development and use of the melograph, an automatic music writer, for musical transcription; and 5) supported the research work of ethnomusicology faculty by creating a publications program for the dissemination of their work.”

=== Herbie Hancock Institute of Jazz Performance ===
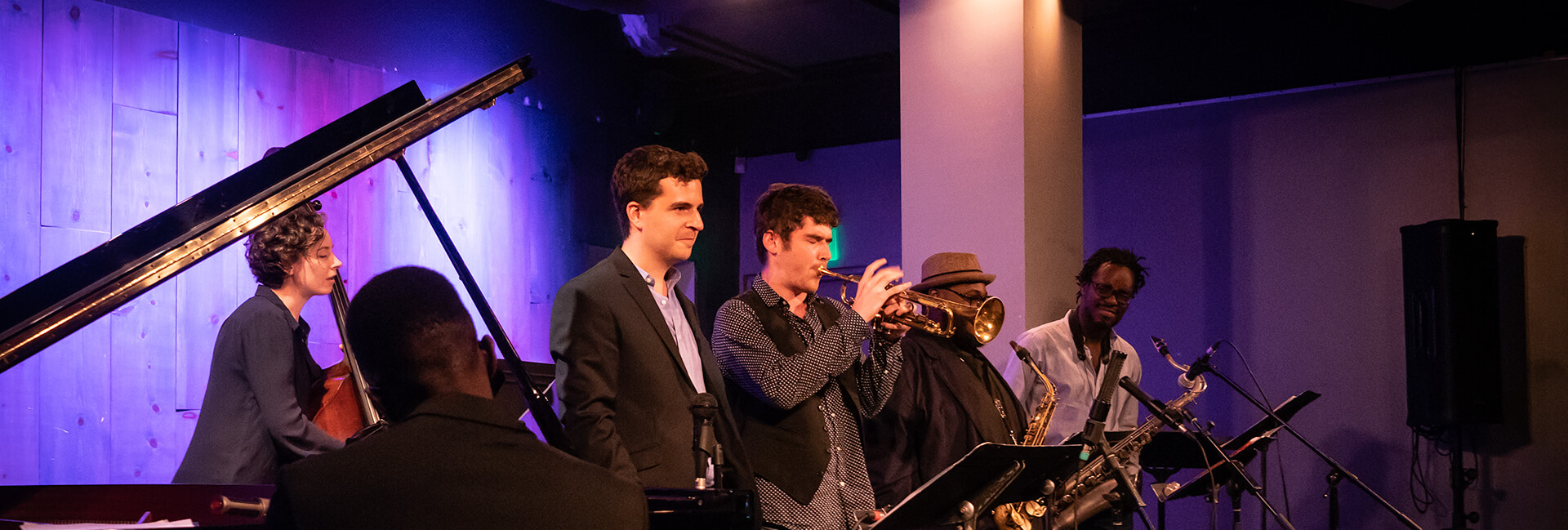
UCLA's 2018-2020 Thelonious Monk Institute Fellows

Established as a college outreach program by the Herbie Hancock Institute of Jazz in Washington D.C., the Herbie Hancock Institute of Jazz Performance at UCLA is a two-year tuition free study program.

The Institute only accepts one ensemble per class annually with students participating in many international and domestic outreach events such as the 40th anniversary of the coronation of the King of Thailand.

== Notable alumni ==
- Cristian Amigo – composer, guitarist, ethnomusicologist
- Brian Asawa – countertenor
- Angel Blue – soprano
- Don Davis – composer
- Akin Euba – musicologist, composer, pianist
- Martha Gonzales – ethnomusicologist, singer, artist, activist
- Ara Guzelimian – academic, scholar
- Jake Heggie – composer, pianist
- James Horner – film composer
- Kiefer - pianist, composer, producer
- Randy Newman – singer-songwriter, arranger, composer, pianist
- Leonard Stein – musicologist, pianist, conductor
- Kamasi Washington – jazz saxophonist, composer
- John Williams – composer, conductor, pianist
- LaMonte Young – composer
- Shahab Paranj – composer

== Notable faculty ==
- Boris Allakhverdyan - clarinetist
- Justo Almario - flutist, saxophonist, bandleader
- Terence Blanchard - trumpeter, composer
- Denis Bouriakov - flutist
- Roger Bourland - composer
- Bruce Broughton - composer
- Kenny Burrell - jazz guitarist, composer
- Mark Carlson- composer
- Regina Carter- jazz violin
- Gloria Cheng - pianist
- Vladimir Chernov - baritone
- Richard Danielpour - composer
- Aubrey Foard - tubist
- Herbie Hancock - jazz pianist, keyboardist, bandleader, composer
- Johana Harris - pianist
- Roy Harris - composer
- Tamir Hendelman - jazz pianist
- Billy Higgins - jazz drummer
- David Kaplan - piano soloist and chamber musician
- Henri Lazarof - composer
- Jens Lindemann - trumpeter
- David Leaf - musicologist, writer, producer, director
- Steve Loza - ethnomusicologist
- Barbara Morrison - jazz singer
- Arturo O'Farrill - jazz pianist, composer, bandleader
- David Raksin - composer
- Paul Reale- composer
- Arnold Schoenberg - composer
- Wayne Shorter - jazz saxophonist and composer
- Leonard Stein – musicologist, pianist, conductor
- Gerald Wilson - jazz trumpeter
