= Yu-Hui Chang =

Composer

- Born: 1970 (age 55–56); Taichung, Taiwan
- Occupation: Composer
- Awards: Guggenheim Fellowship; Arts and Letters Award from the American Academy of Arts and Letters

Yu-Hui Chang (Chinese: 張玉慧; born 1970) is a Taiwanese composer based in the United States. She received awards including a Guggenheim Fellowship in 2009, and the Arts and Letters Award from the American Academy of Arts and Letters in 2017. She is the Victor and Gwendolyn Beinfield Professor of Music at Brandeis University.

== Education ==
Yu-Hui Chang began studying music with a focus on piano, voice and music theory at six years of age. By the age of fourteen she was actively following a path toward a career in composition. She graduated from the National Taiwan Normal University, and in 1994 came to the United States to study music composition. She received her Masters of Music degree from Boston University and a Ph.D from Brandeis University. From 1996 until 2006 Chang was on the faculty of University of California, Davis. In 2006 she moved to Brandeis University as a composition faculty member, and as of 2022 she is the Victor and Gwendolyn Beinfield Professor of Music.

== Career ==
Chang composes for orchestra, chamber ensemble, vocalists and soloists. While at the University of California, Davis Chang co-directed Empyrean Ensemble where she as performed as a conductor or a pianist. In 2006 she was featured in the New York Guggenheim Museum’s Works & Process series. The Walter W. Naumburg Foundation commissioned Chang to compose After Ego for the 2015 Naumburg cello competition winner, Lev Sivkov, who gave the premiere in Weil Recital Hall at Carnegie Hall in April 2019. From 2009-2016, Chang co-directed Boston-based Dinosaur Annex Music Ensemble. In 2018 the Boston Modern Orchestra Project premiered a twenty-minute long composition of her work. While Chang would not admit to spending time in video arcades as a child, the sounds of the arcades served as the inspiration for her orchestral piece "Pixelandia". The piece was commissioned by the Fromm Music Foundation in 2008.

== Awards and honors ==
In 1998 Chang received the Yoshiro Irino Memorial Prize from the Asian Composers League. Between 2008-2009 Chang received multiple honors including a Guggenheim Fellowship, the Copland House Residency Award, the Charles Ives Prize from the American Academy of Arts and Letters, Koussevitzky Music Foundation in the Library of Congress. The American Academy of Arts and Letters gave her an Arts and Letters Award in Music in 2017.
