= Peter Van Zandt Lane =

American composer (born 1985)

Peter Van Zandt Lane (born Port Jefferson, New York on May 13, 1985) is an American composer of acoustic and electroacoustic music.

== Biography ==
Peter Van Zandt Lane is a recipient of a 2018 Charles Ives Fellowship from the American Academy of Arts and Letters, a 2017 Aaron Copland House Award, and a 2015 Composers Now residency at the Pocantico Center. He was named the 2020 Music Teachers National Association (MTNA) Distinguished Composer of the Year. Other residencies include MacDowell Colony, Yaddo, Virginia Center for the Creative Arts, and the Atlantic Center for the Arts. He has been commissioned twice by the Barlow Endowment for Music Composition (2011 and 2014), the Atlanta Chamber Players, American Chamber Winds for a concerto for trombonist Joseph Alessi, the Composers Conference and Chamber Music Center at Wellesley College, the Sydney Conservatorium Wind Ensemble, Juventas New Music Ensemble, Emory Wind Ensemble, and Dinosaur Annex Music Ensemble. His music has been played by International Contemporary Ensemble, New York Virtuoso Singers, the Cleveland Orchestra, Ensemble Signal, Talea Ensemble, Freon Ensemble (Rome), and Triton Brass. His compositions for wind ensembles –namely Hivemind and Astrarium– have become programmed widely by college and university wind ensembles in the United States.

Lane holds degrees from Brandeis University (M.A., Ph.D.) and the University of Miami Frost School of Music (B.M.). His composition teachers include Melinda Wagner, David Rakowski, Eric Chasalow, and Lansing McLoskey. He has held positions at Wellesley College, Harvard University, MIT, the University of Florida, and is currently composition faculty at the University of Georgia.

== Works ==
Lane's 2017 concerto for trombone and wind ensemble, Radix Tyrannis, was commissioned by American Chamber Winds for trombonist Joseph Alessi, and was premiered at the 2017 World Association for Symphonic Bands and Ensembles conference in Utrecht, Netherlands.

Peter Van Zandt Lane's 2013 ballet, "HackPolitik" was composed for and premiered by Boston-based Juventas New Music Ensemble and Brooklyn-based contemporary dance company The People Movers. Based on a series of cyber-attacks between 2010 and 2012 linked to the hacker groups Anonymous and LulzSec, the ballet depicts the rise and fall of Topiary (hacktivist) and Sabu (hacktivist) through a combination of “electroacoustic music, modern dance, and video projection" and "examine[s] how the Internet . . . blurs the lines between activism and anarchy.” The music and choreography (by People Movers Artistic Director Kate Ladenheim) aims to "translat[e] cyberspace into music and motion." In an interview with the Clyde Fitch Report, Lane cited the wider cultural implications of social networking as a motivation for composing the piece, stating that “whether or not we are engaged in cyber-activism… we are constantly thinking about ‘what do I write here? How do I portray myself to the rest of the world?’… We spend an enormous amount of effort into shaping our online personalities.” Described as "angular, jarring, and sophisticated . . . very compelling," the piece received positive critical reviews; the Boston Musical Intelligencer stated "Lane’s score was friendly to listeners, emotionally and texturally varied . . . Ballet needs live music and this one offered it on the highest level." Noting the poignancy of the premiere, Forbes writer Parmy Olson (whose book We Are Anonymous served as a primary resource for the ballet) noted that "the same day that hacker Jeremy Hammond was sentenced to 10 years in prison for his role in the vigilante attacks of Anonymous, an altogether more artistic outcome for the online network took place. The hour-long premier of HackPolitik . . . reflect[s] the story of the Anonymous . . . and the rise and fall of its hacker splinter group LulzSec." The ballet was premiered in Boston, and subsequently at Here Space in Manhattan, where it was dubbed a New York Times Critic's Pick.

== Selected works ==
Orchestral and Wind Symphony

- Echo Chambers (2019)
- Radix Tyrannis (trombone concerto) (2017)
- Beacons (2016)
- Astrarium (2015)
- Hivemind (2014)
- Slant Apparatus (2010)

Solo/Chamber Ensemble (with electronics)

- /chatter/ (2017)
- Persistent Tracings (2017)
- /ping/ (2016)
- Studies in Momentum (2014)
- Anonymous dances (suite from HackPolitik) (2013)
- Impulse Control (2012)
- String Quartet #1 (2011)
- Triptiek (2009)
- Manteia (Aeromancer, Hydromancer, Pyromancer, Chronomancer) (2008-2013) for bassoon and electronics

Solo/Chamber Ensemble (without electronics)

- Piano Quartet: The Longitude Problem (2018)
- Chamber Symphony (2015)
- Caecilia's Iris (2012) for organ
- Busker Fantasy (2011)
- Seven Rants (2011)
- Beacons (2010)
- Danzas Mecánicas (2010)
- Poa Pratensis (2010)
- Fugue State (2008)
- Piano Trio #1 (Taijitu) (2007)
- Pace (2006)

Vocal

- To The Sun, To The Risen (2010) (text by Franz Wright)
