= Mark Carlson (composer) =

American classical composer (born 1952)

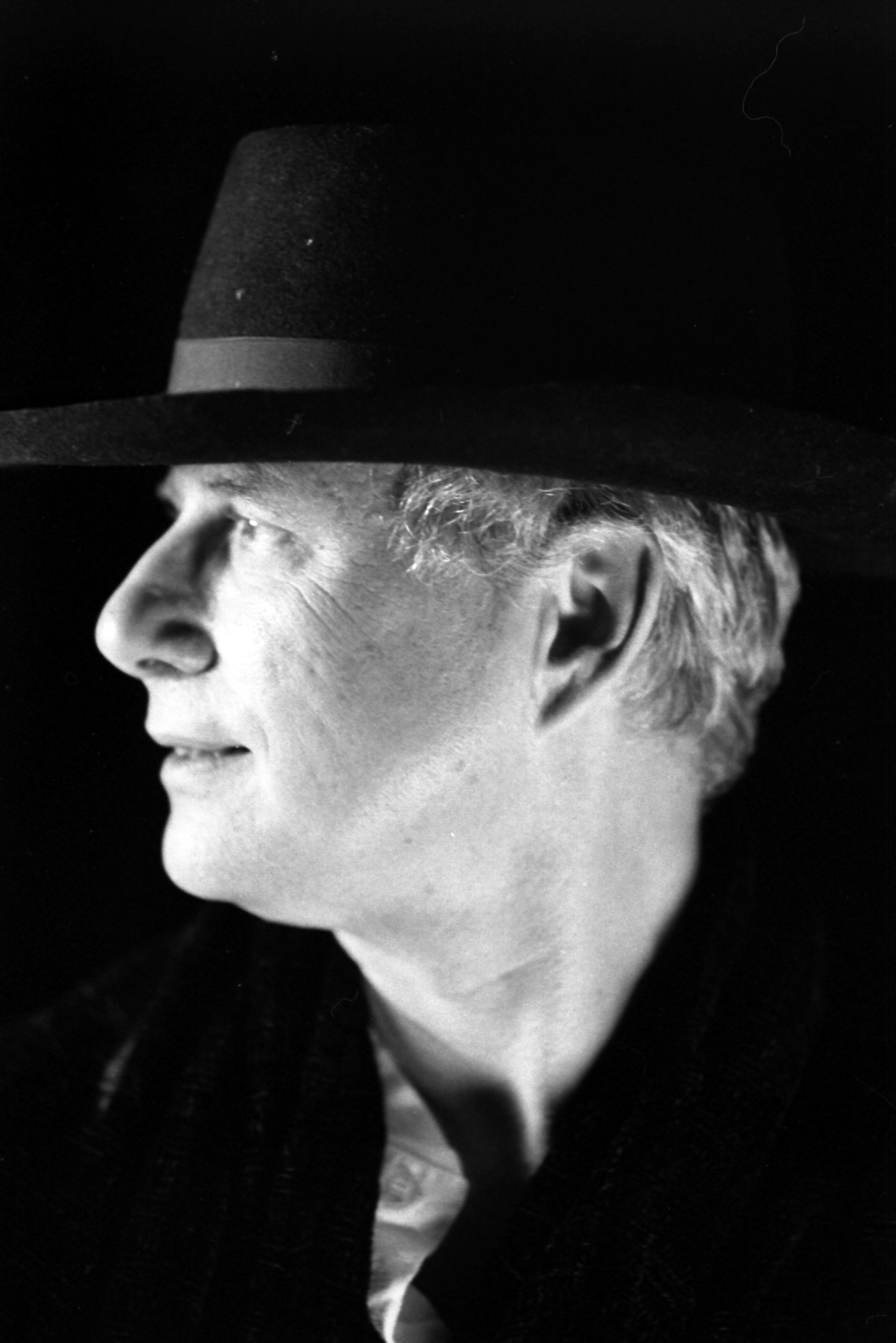
Mark Carlson, photographed by Roger Bourland

Mark Carlson (born June 13, 1952) is an American composer, flutist, UCLA professor, and the founder and artistic director of the chamber music ensemble Pacific Serenades.

== Biography ==
Born in Fort Lewis, Washington, and raised primarily in Modesto, California, Carlson attended Johnston College at the University of Redlands; received a B.A. from California State University, Fresno, in 1974, where he studied composition with Dennis Riley and David Bates; and received M.A. (1978) and Ph.D. (1984) degrees in Music Theory and Composition at UCLA, where he studied with Alden Ashforth and Paul Reale. His principal flute teacher was Roger S. Stevens, with whom he studied privately beginning in 1972. In 1982, he founded the Los Angeles-based chamber ensemble, Pacific Serenades, for which he continues to serve as artistic director. His more than 100 works include songs, chamber music, choral music, concertos, and music for orchestra and for symphonic wind ensemble. Carlson is a 2013 recipient of a letter of distinction from New Music USA for his "significant contribution to the field of contemporary American music" in founding and serving as artistic director of Pacific Serenades.

Carlson has taught music theory, composition, orchestration, and classes at the UCLA Herb Alpert School of Music since 1985, and also taught music theory and composition at Santa Monica College from 1993 to 2008. He retired from UCLA in July 2018 and is living in Palm Springs, California. Carlson is currently composing The Scarlet Letter, an opera in-progress, with librettist Bruce Oldstad.

== Selected works ==
=== Concertos ===
- Concerto for organ and orchestra (1997)
- Concerto for piano and wind ensemble (1994)
- Concerto for trumpet, piano, and orchestra (2004)

=== Chamber music ===
- Abschied for cello and piano (1993)
- An American Quintet, string quintet for 2 violins, 2 violas, and cello (1997)
- Batik for violin and piano (2010)
- The Darkest Day for euphonium and organ (2007)
- Dream Fantasies for flute, oboe, viola, and piano (1999)
- A Family Portrait in Five Scenes for clarinet, violin, cello, and piano (2005)
- 5 Little Pieces for flute and piano (1976)
- The Hall of Mirrors for clarinet and piano (1990)
- Intermezzo for alto saxophone and piano (2003)
- The Mysterious Divertimento of Dr. T for flute and harpsichord (1980)
- Night Music for flute (alto flute), and horn quartet (2008)
- Nightwings for wind quintet and tape (1978)
- Piano Quartet for violin, viola, cello, and piano (1992)
- Piano Trio for violin, cello, and piano (2001)
- Postcards from Silver Lake for clarinet, alto saxophone, and piano (2010)
- Prayer for Peace for 8 horns (2008)
- Quartet for flute, clarinet (bass clarinet), cello, and piano (1994)
- Short Stories for string quartet (2005)
- 6 Bagatelles for flute and string quartet (1995)
- Sonata for cello and piano (1998)
- On the Coming of War, Sonata for viola and piano (2003)
- Starry Night for string quartet (1989)
- Sueños y canciones (Dreams and Songs) for flute and piccolo, clarinet and bass clarinet, violin, cello, and double bass (2001)
- 3 Romances for flute and piano (1986)
- View from a Hilltop for clarinet (bass clarinet), violin, cello, and piano (2009)

=== Vocal ===
- After the Sun Has Set for mezzo-soprano and 11 instruments (1986); words by Edna St. Vincent Millay
- Cuatro sonetos de amor for soprano and piano (1998); words by Pablo Neruda
- Entre la sombra y la alma (Between the shadow and the soul) for soprano, horn, and piano (2008); words by Pablo Neruda
- From One Who Stays for mezzo-soprano, flute, cello, and piano (1992); various poets
- From the Song of Songs for soprano and piano (1988); translation by Marcia Falk
- From the Song of Songs: Part II for mezzo-soprano and piano (1992); translation by Marcia Falk
- Night Will Blossom for medium-low voice, flute, and piano (1994); various poets
- Patchen Songs for baritone and piano (1976); words by Kenneth Patchen
- Songs of Rumi for bass-baritone, clarinet, violin, cello, and piano (2007); words by Rumi
- This Is the Garden for baritone and piano (1987); words by E. E. Cummings
- Two Songs for mezzo-soprano, tenor saxophone, viola, cello, and piano (2005); words by Alfred, Lord Tennyson, and Elizabeth Bishop

=== Choral ===
- The Ballad of Charlie Howard (A Kenduskeag Trilogy) for TTBB and piano (2001); words by Bruce Olstad, Brian Quint, and the composer
- Come, O Holy Spirit, Come for SATB, flute, and organ (2002)
- Common Link and The Enemy of Truth for TTBB, violin, and piano (2002); texts by John F. Kennedy
- From Children's Voices for SATB and piano (1993); Miracles: Poems by Children of the English-Speaking World, collected by Richard Lewis
- Let All Things Now Living for SATB and organ (1993); Katherine K. Davis, poet
- Mass: Christ in Majesty for chorus, orchestra, and organ (1987)
- Welcome Winter! for TTBB and piano (2002); words by Bruce Olstad
- A Wreath of Anthems (An American Christmas Cantata) for SATB and orchestra (1990); various American poets
