= Hafdís Bjarnadóttir =

Icelandic composer and guitarist

Hafdís Bjarnadóttir (born 1977) is an Icelandic composer and electric guitarist who gained prominence in 2013 when she was inspired by a knitting pattern for a lace shawl to compose "Thordis’ Fichu". She received wide acclaim in 2015 for her "Sounds of Iceland", a journey through Iceland made up of a series of field recordings of the natural sounds of waterfalls, birds, lakes, the sea and geysers.

== Biography ==
Born in Reykjavík on 17 August 1977, Hafdís Bjarnadóttir has played the electric guitar since she was 12, initially concentrating on rock and folk music. She qualified in jazz guitar playing at the Icelandic school of music, Tónlistarskóli FÍH, in 2002. In 2007, she earned a bachelor's degree at the Iceland Academy of the Arts before completing a master's degree at the Royal Danish Academy of Music in 2009.

Hafdís' music has drawn on a combination of jazz, rock and folk, as well as classical and modern music. She often composes items involving surprisingly different instruments. She has recorded two solo albums and has written commissioned pieces for solo instruments and ensembles. Her album JÆJA (2009) was nominated for the Icelandic Music Awards. In 2013, she composed "Á báðum áttum for flute, clarinet and percussion, and Jólastökur, a choral work commissioned by the Icelandic National Broadcasting Service for Christmas 2013. "Thordis' Fichu" and "Sounds of Iceland" followed in 2013 and 2015.

In 2017, for Musica nova Helsinki she composed "Wind Roses", inspired by Iceland's wind roses which are used to measure wind direction. The piece combined piano, bass, flute, clarinet and cello.

Hafdís Bjarnadóttir composed "A Northern Year" for Passepartout Duo in 2019, a piece that chronicles the sun's position over Reykjavík during the year through scientific data that is used in the composition process.

== Discography ==
- Nú (2002)
- JÆJA (2009)
- Sounds of Iceland (2015)
- Já (2017)
- A Northern Year (2019)
- Lighthouse (2020)
