= Paul Reale =

American composer (1943–2020)

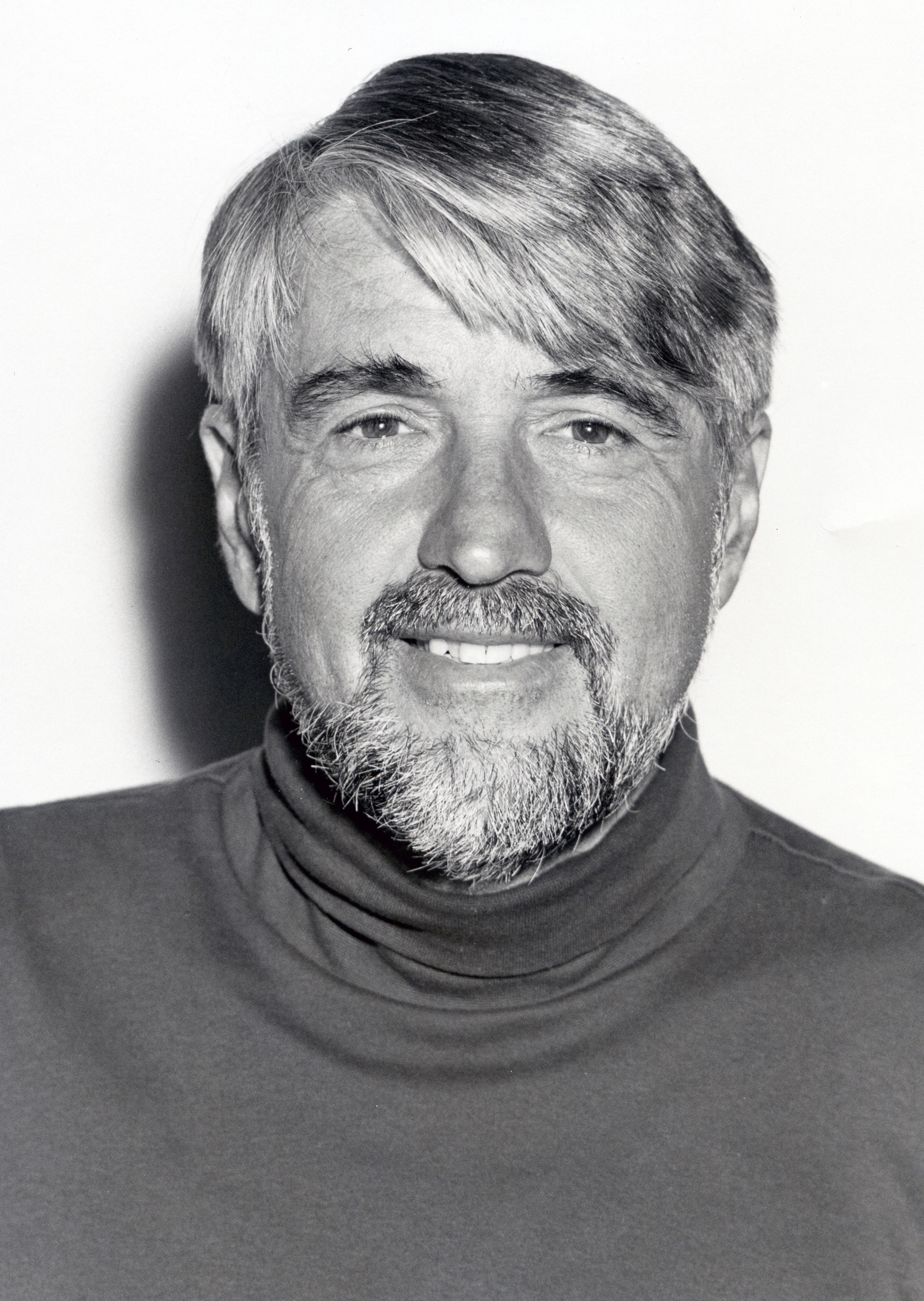

Paul Reale (March 2, 1943 – July 22, 2020) was an American composer, pianist, and professor of music at the University of California, Los Angeles.

== Biography ==
Born in New Brunswick, New Jersey, Reale studied English literature and chemistry at Columbia College, Columbia University, before earning a degree there in composition in 1967 under the primary tutelage of Chou Wen-chung and Otto Luening. He continued his composition studies at the University of Pennsylvania, where he studied with George Rochberg and George Crumb.

From 1969 until his retirement in 2004, he taught music theory and composition at UCLA, where in 1995, he received the Charles and Harriet Luckman Award for Distinguished Teaching; as of 2006, he was a Professor Emeritus at UCLA. His catalogue includes twelve piano sonatas, nine concertos for various instruments, two song cycles, and dozens of other vocal, chamber, and dramatic works.

He had a long-term relationship with the Mirecourt Trio and its members, John Jensen, Terry King, and Kenneth Goldsmith, as well as with violinist Jessica Mathaes, cellist Kim Cook, the Borealis Wind Quintet, pianists Walter Ponce, Christopher Guzman, Colette Valentine, and conductors William Boughton, Jon Robertson, David Whitwell, and Guillermo Figueroa. Included among many commissions are those from the Ahmanson Organ Programming Endowment, the Jerome Foundation, Pacific Serenades, and the Wisconsin Chamber Orchestra.

His music has been published by Carl Fischer Inc., Theodore Presser Co., Laurendale Associates, Pacific Serenades., and Seesaw Music. His many recordings are available on the Naxos, MSR, and Music & Arts labels.

Among his well-known students are James Horner, Jake Heggie, Mark Carlson, Chris Anderson Bazzoli, and Yiorgos Vassilandonakis

Reale was married for 44 years to conductor, cellist, teacher, and photographer Claire Rydell.

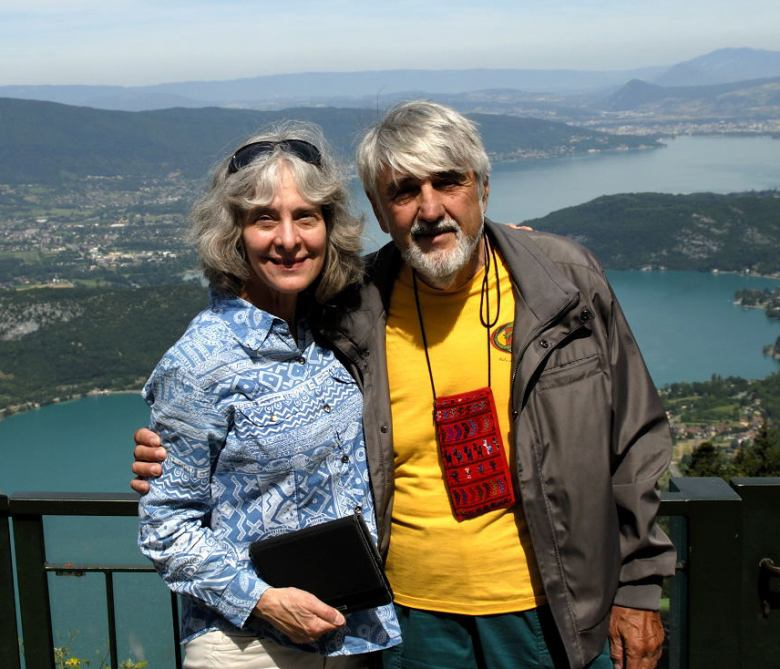

== Selected music ==
=== Works for solo piano ===
- Thirteenth Floor, Concert Etude Number 3 (2020)
- Paganini Fantasy (2019)
- Stroke of Midnight (Piano Sonata No. 12) (2018)
- Chocolate Soccer Ball, a piano novelty (2018)
- Sonata for Fortepiano (Piano Sonata No. 11) (2011)
- Sonata Piazzollana (Piano Sonata No. 10) (2010)
- Beethoven for the Brain Dead, or Learning Twenty of the Master's Works in Less than Four Minutes (2009)
- The Carman's Whistle (2009)
- Dancing Lessons with Mr. Bean (2009)
- Concert Etude No. 2 (2008)
- Furball Elise (2005)
- Piano Sonata No. 9, "Satanic Mass" (2000)
- Piano Sonata No. 8, "Il Trionfo della Folia" (1997)
- Piano Sonata No. 7, "Veni Creator Spiritus" (1994)
- Piano Sonata No. 6‚"The Waste Land" (March 22, 1992)
- Piano Sonata No. 5 in A (1988)
- Sonata Brahmsiana (Piano Sonata No. 3) (1985)
- Dance Sonata (Piano Sonata No. 2) (1985)
- First Sonata (1985, 2019)

=== Works for two pianos or piano four hands ===
- Watchman, Tell Us of the Night: Fanfare eight hands at two pianos (2015)
- Chorales II for two pianos (2012)
- Minuet in G Whiz for two pianos (2008)
- "Dies Irae" Redux for two pianos (2006)
- World of a Bengal Child for piano four hands (2015)
- Drowsy Maggie for two pianos (1999, 2015)
- CPE for Two Pianos (1997, 1999)
- Serge P for two pianos (1993)
- Little Screamers for piano 4 hands (1981)

=== Works for solo guitar ===
- Lachrymae (1977)
- Intavolatura II (1976)
- Intavolatura (1974)
- Crwth Myth (1972-1974)

=== Other solo works ===
- Composers’ Reminiscences for solo violin (2000, 2009)
- Claire's Book of Hours for solo violoncello (2009)
- Seance (at a Late Hour) for solo cello (1973–74)

=== Concertos ===
- Cuban Concerto for Piano and Orchestra (Piano Concerto No. 4) (2019)
- Seven Trumpets of the Apocalypse for seven trumpets, solo violin, piano, string orchestra (2015)
- Concerto Grosso for Piano and String Orchestra; additional solo strings: violin, viola, cello (2015)
- Caldera with Ice Cave for Piano and String Orchestra (Piano Concerto No. 3) (1999, 2012)
- Concerto for Three Trumpets and Wind Ensemble “Watchman, Tell us of the Night” (1996)
- Piano Concerto No. 2 "Matisse-Jazz" (1992)
- Columbus Concerto for organ and wind ensemble (1991)
- Concerto for Violoncello, Strings, and Percussion "Live Free or Die" (2018)
- Violin Concerto for orchestra with double winds (1990)
- Piano Concerto No. 1 (1986)
- Concerto "Dies Irae" for piano trio and winds (1982, 2015)

=== Duets (including sonatas with piano acc.) ===
- Horn Call horn and piano (2017)
- Sonata for Bassoon and Piano 'Dies Irae' (2017)
- Sonata for Oboe/English Horn and Piano (2017)
- Transfiguration for Clarinet and Piano (2017)
- Sonata No. 2 for Violoncello and Piano "Chopin's Ghosts" (2014)
- Durch Die Jahrzeiten II for violoncello and piano (2013)
- Seven Deadly Sins for violin and piano (2009)
- Wexford Carol violoncello and piano (2004)
- Sonata For Violin and Piano "Celtic Wedding" (1990, 2007)
- Dark Star and Strife for trumpet and piano (1989)
- Holiday Suite for violin and piano (2004); version for violoncello and piano (2011)
- Children's Palace for flute and piano (1983, 2016)
- Sonata for Violoncello and Piano (1982)

=== Trios ===
- Three Graces for three violoncellos (2020)
- Zez's Cartoon Cafe for Bb clarinet, viola, piano (2013)
- Le Bonheur de Vivre for Bb clarinet, violoncello, piano (2006)
- In Dulci Jubilo for Bb clarinet, violoncello, piano (2005)
- Piano Trio No. 2, "Drowsey Maggie" (1988)
- Piano Trio No. 1 (1980)

=== Quartets ===
- Piano Quartet, "Aimez Vous Brahms?" (2016)
- Simplexity for string quartet (2014)
- Wexford Quartet for string quartet (2011)
- A Paul Klee Gallery for Flute Quartet (four flutes, doubling piccolos, alto, bass) (2001)
- Dvorak, Anyone? for saxophone quartet (1991)
- The Mysterious Death of the Magic Realist for viola, violoncello, guitar, harpsichord (1972)

=== Chamber music for larger combinations ===
- Sextet No. 2 "The Sweet One" for flute, 2 clarinets, 2 trumpets, 2 trombones, tuba, timpani (2017)
- Hextet for 2 violins, 2 violas, 2 violoncellos (also version with double bass) (2017)
- Your Reality Check is in the Mail for oboe, alto saxophone, violin, violoncello, piano (2006)
- Octet Windstorm for 2 oboes, 2 clarinets, 2 horns, 2 bassoons (2004)
- Graces and Furies clarinet and string quartet (1988)
- Eleven Miniatures for Wind Quintet (1978)

=== Works for wind ensemble (not including concertos) ===
- Inferno (2003)
- Moonrise, A Polonaise, Early Light (1983, 1985)
- Screamers (1980)

=== Works for orchestra (not including concertos) ===
- American Elegy for string orchestra (2007)
- Sinfonia Concertante "La Folia" for large orchestra (1995)
- Dancer's Dream for string orchestra (1980, 1993)

=== Dramatic works ===
- Democracy Rigged, libretto by Richard Gochman (2016)
- Uncle Sigmund Goes to the Opera (1986)
- The Ballad of the Sleazy Palace Café, opera in one act, libretto by Peter Belfiore (1979, 1981)
- The Waltz King for SATB solos, 2 violins, piano, narrator (1976)
- America: A Premature Celebration for flute, violin, guitar, narrator. Text by E. E. Cummings (1975)
- Mad Ophelia for soprano, chorus, orchestra, and quadraphonic electronic tape (1974)
- Terza Prattica for soloists, chorus, collegium, and chamber orchestra (1972, 1974)

=== Songs ===
- Serene Words, five songs for mezzo-soprano and piano on poems of Gabriela Mistral (2000)
- Hopkins Songs, four songs for tenor and piano (1994)
- Regrets of Adolescence for soprano, trumpet, bass clarinet (1978)

=== Choral works ===
- Ave Maria for SAA and piano (2016)
- A Better Resurrection for soprano solo, TTB, piano (2007)
- Resignation for SSAATTBB and piano (2007)
- Psalm 109 for two solo baritones, SATB, piano, percussion (2001)
- Psalm 84 for SATB and organ (1995)
- What is Life? for SSATBB (1985)
- The Lamb for solo bass, SAA, text: Blake (1981)
- We All Loved You, Jenny Jo for mezzo-soprano and SATB (1981, 2017)
- Spring and Fall for SSATB, text: Hopkins (1978)

=== Curiosities ===
- Du bist bei Mir for C trumpet, violoncello, keyboard (2005)
- En Chapeau for violin and piano, a burlesque made out of quotations from the music of Claude Debussy (2004)
- Watchman, Tell us of the Night for three trumpets and organ (1996)

== Discography ==
- Le Bonheur de Vivre, in Pierrot Ensemble Series, vol. 1, along with works by Pellegrino, Arnesen, Price, Yip, Lin—Ablaze Records ar-00035
- Caldera with Ice Cave: Music for Strings: American Elegy, Hextet, Caldera with Ice Cave (Piano Concerto no. 3); Dancer’s Dream, Concerto Grosso, American Elegy with Chimes. Christopher Guzman, piano; Lynn Philharmonia; Guillermo Figueroa, Jon Robertson, conductors—MSR Classics: MS 1703
- Cello Concerto “Live Free or Die”, in Paul Reale: American Mosaic, with Piano Concerto No. 1, Piano Sonata No. 6 “The Waste Land”. Kim Cook (cello), John Jensen (piano), Paul Reale (piano), Yale Symphony Orchestra, William Boughton—Naxos 8559898
- Children’s Palace: Chamber Music for Winds and Piano:Children’s Palace (Sonata for flute and piano), Sonata for oboe and piano, Transfiguration for clarinet and piano, Horn Call for horn and piano, Sonata for bassoon and piano “Dies irae”, Eleven miniatures for wind quintet. Borealis Wind Quintet; Christopher Guzman, piano—MSR Classics 1715
- Chopin’s Ghosts: Works for Cello and Piano: Chopin’s Ghost Cello (Sonata No. 2), Séance, Wexford Carol, Cello Sonata no. 1, Durch die Jahreszeiten (German Folk Songs). Kim Cook, cello; Christopher Guzman, piano—Naxos 8.559820
- Concerto Dies Irae for Piano Trio and Wind Ensemble, Piano Sonatas Nos. 7 & 8. The Mirecourt Trio; Walter Ponce, piano; Paul Reale, piano; California State University Wind Ensemble, David Whitwell, conductor—MSR Classics: MS1693
- Drowsey Maggie: Piano Trio no. 2, in Trio America, along with works by Persichetti and Cowell. The Mirecourt Trio—Music & Arts CD-686
- Music for 2 Pianos and Piano 4-hands, in CME Presents Piano Celebration, vol. 2, includes Drowsey Maggie, Serge P, World of a Bengal Child, CPE, Chorales II, Minuet in G Whiz, Little Screamers, Watchman, Tell Us of the Night. Center for Music Excellence (CME) artists—MSR Classics MS 1612
- Piano Sonata no. 1 (First Sonata); Dance Sonata (Piano Sonata no. 2), along with works by Aaron Copland. John Jensen, piano—Music & Arts CD-738
- Piano Sonata no. 3 (“Brahmsiana”); Salon Music, with works by Bloch, Ruggles, and Lipkis. John Jensen, piano—Music & Arts CD-757
- Piano Sonata No. 6 (“The Wasteland”), in Contemporary Eclectic Music for the Piano, Vol. X. Jeffrey Jacob, Piano—New Ariel Records
- Seven Deadly Sins: Works for Violin and Piano, works include Seven Deadly Sins, Composers’ Reminiscences, Sonata for Violin and Piano “Celtic Wedding”, Holiday Suite. Jessica Mathaes, violin, Colette Valentine, piano—Naxos 9.70204
- Sonata for Cello & Piano, in American Cello, along with works by Barber, Cooper, Harris. Terry King, cello, John Jensen, piano—Music & Arts CD-4603
- Stroke of Midnight: Piano Music, works include Piano Sonata no. 5 in A, Chocolate Soccer Ball, Piano Sonata No. 10 “Sonata Piazollana”, Concert Etude No. 2, Piano Sonata no. 12 “Stroke of Midnight”, Beethoven for the Brain Dead. John Jensen, piano—Naxos 8.559879¬
