= Boris Allakhverdyan =

Armenian-American clarinet player

Boris Allakhverdyan is an Armenian-American clarinet player. He currently performs as principal clarinet at the Los Angeles Philharmonic, and serves on the faculties of the UCLA Herb Alpert School of Music, and California State University, Fullerton.

== Early life ==
Allakhverdyan was raised in Russia, where he started the clarinet at age 9. His father, Valery Allakhverdyan, was principal clarinet of the Baku Opera House. Allakhverdyan studied at the Moscow Conservatory, and at age 19, he moved to the United States to study at the Oberlin Conservatory of Music. At Oberlin, Allakhverdyan formed the Prima Trio, a chamber ensemble that later won the Fischoff National Chamber Music Competition in 2007. He graduated in 2006 with two degrees- a performance certificate and an artist diploma. Allakhverdyan then enrolled at the Cleveland Institute of Music for his master's degree.

== Career ==
In his first year at the Cleveland Institute of Music in 2008, he earned a full-time orchestral position as associate principal clarinetist of the Kansas City Symphony. After four years in Kansas City, Allakhverdyan won principal clarinet of the Metropolitan Opera Orchestra. In 2016, he won his current position as principal clarinet with the Los Angeles Philharmonic, where he joined other former Met principal players Whitney Crockett and Denis Bouriakov.

In 2018, he received faculty appointments at Cal State Fullerton and UCLA Herb Alpert School of Music.
