= Lansing McLoskey =

American composer (born 1964)

- Born: Lansing Dickson McLoskey; August 21, 1964 (age 61); Mountain View, California, U.S.
- Genres: contemporary classical
- Occupation(s): Composer, Professor
- Years active: 1989–present
- Website: soundcloud.com/lansingmcloskey
- notable works - Zealot Canticles: An Oratorio for Tolerance, What We Do Is Secret

Lansing McLoskey (born 1964) is an American composer of contemporary classical music. His Zealot Canticles: An Oratorio for Tolerance was a winner of the 61st Annual Grammy Award for Best Choral Performance by the ensemble The Crossing. McLoskey serves as a Professor of Music at the Frost School of Music in Miami, Florida. He has been commissioned by Guerilla Opera, Copland House, The Fromm Foundation, The Barlow Endowment, N.E.A., The Crossing, ensemberlino vocale, New Spectrum Foundation, Ensemble Berlin PianoPercussion, Passepartout Duo, the Boston Choral Ensemble, and Kammerkoret NOVA.

== Early life ==
McLoskey was born to Robert and JoAnn McLoskey in 1964. His grandfather, Heinrich "Henry" L. Hansen was born in Denmark. Growing up in Cupertino, California, Lansing came from a musical family. His mother minored in piano performance at Cal State Fresno, his father played saxophone, and his grandfather, Illinois congressman Robert T. McLoskey, played violin in a regional orchestra. As a teenager, McLoskey learned to play piano, guitar, and saxophone. He started writing rock songs at 14 after buying an electric guitar at a flea market. After high school, McLoskey studied abroad as a student at Holte Gymnasium in Denmark, where he learned to speak Danish.

Although his tastes were eclectic, McLoskey found himself drawn to music outside the mainstream, including Prog Rock, Punk Rock, Industrial, Goth, No-Wave, and Post-Punk. He immersed himself in the hardcore punk scene in the San Francisco Bay Area, and played in several punk, surf, goth-dance, and experimental bands in high school and college, including The Suburban Lemmings, The Minority, The Bruces, Spangled Blew, and a "punk opera" project he co-wrote called Stanly in the Sewer. Around this time, McLoskey had a spiritual awakening and dropped his musical pursuits to serve an LDS mission in Denmark.

== Education ==
McLoskey applied to UC Santa Barbara while on his mission. Initially planning on majoring in piano performance, he was taken aback when he heard, in the same week, Luciano Berio's Sinfonia, Igor Stravinsky's Rite of Spring, and "Non al suo amante" by the trecento Italian composer Jacopo da Bologna. These experiences inspired him to shift his focus to composition. They also marked the beginning of his love for early music. "Early music performance was one of the most important things in my life from undergraduate through my doctoral studies and beyond, and it started at UC Santa Barbara", McLoskey has said. He joined Capella Cordina, the early music choir at UCSB directed by Alejandro Planchart, changed his major to composition, and completed a BA in composition in 1989. McLoskey considers his string quartet flux in situ (1989, rev. 1991) his first representative piece.

During his Master's studies at the USC Thornton School of Music, McLoskey continued his pursuits in both composition and early music. He studied composition with Stephen Hartke and Donald Crockett, and counterpoint with Morten Lauridsen. Along with several master's students in early music performance, McLoskey founded the vocal sextet Clamores Antiqui. He also studied early music voice at The Amherst Early Music Festival and Workshop.

After completing his master's, McLoskey worked for four years at Sound Solutions, a home automation and systems integration company in Santa Monica. The company let him take time off to pursue music. In 1993 he was an American-Scandinvavian Foundation Fellow at Det Kongelige Danske Musikkonservatorium (the Royal Danish Academy of Music), where he studied composition with Ib Nørholm and contemporary and Renaissance choral techniques with composer/conductor Bo Holten and Ars Nova Copenhagen. In 1994 he attended the Advanced Masters Program at the Aspen Music Festival and School, where he worked with Jacob Druckman and Bernard Rands, which led to McLoskey’s attending Harvard University for his doctorate. He also taught music theory and aural skills at The Crossroads School for the Arts in Santa Monica.

During this time, McLoskey met, dated, and married his wife, Kathleen Jordan. In 1995, the couple moved to Boston, both to pursue degrees: McLoskey, a Ph.D. at Harvard, and his wife, her undergraduate, master's degree and artist diploma in opera performance. As a composition student at Harvard, McLoskey studied with Rands and Mario Davidovsky. He also continued to pursue early music and his interest in contemporary Danish music and composers. He took courses in early music performance at the Longy School of Music, studied voice with mezzo-soprano Laurie Monahan of Ensemble P.A.N. (Project Ars Nova), published a book on 20th-century Danish composers, presented papers and published an article on 20th-century Danish music, and was awarded the Einar & Eva Haugen Award for Scandinavian Studies.

After having three children while he pursued all these interests, his wife told McLoskey, “You can't be a composer, singer, conductor, musicologist, and a father and husband. Something's got to give.” Accordingly, he cut back on his early music performance and Danish musical research. Still, McLoskey remained busy writing his dissertation; giving private lessons; teaching at Harvard, Wellesley, and Longy; holding two church jobs as a singer and organist; and running a skateboard company, Latter-Day Skates, for eight years.

== Personal life ==
McLoskey married Kathleen Jordan in 1995. They have three children. A member of the LDS Church, McLoskey does not smoke or drink alcohol or coffee. He is an avid surfer, cyclist, and fly fisherman.

== Career ==
Lansing McLoskey at Copland House, June 2022.

After completing his Ph.D., McLoskey taught for three years as a Lecturer at Harvard, and had Visiting Professor appointments at Wellesley College and the Longy School of Music. In 2005, McLoskey joined the faculty of the University of Miami’s Frost School of Music, where he is a professor of composition and theory. His students include American composers Peter Van Zandt Lane, Ben Morris, and Benjamin Webster, Italian composer Alessandra Salvati, and Brazilian composer Rodrigo Bussad. While at Frost, he formed, conducted, and sang with The Other Voices, a vocal ensemble performing medieval, Renaissance, and 20th/21st century repertoire.

McLoskey's music has been performed in 22 countries on six continents. He has received over 50 national and international composition awards, prizes, and fellowships, including the 2011 Goddard Lieberson Fellowship from the American Academy of Arts and Letters. McLoskey also holds the distinction of being the only composer in the history of the Contemporary Music Festival to win both the orchestral and chamber music competitions (awarded by two independent, blind juries).

He has been commissioned by the National Endowment for the Arts, Pew Charitable Trusts, the Barlow Endowment, The Fromm Foundation, Aaron Copland House, Meet The Composer, ASCAP & SCI (the Society of Composers, Inc.), the MATA Festival, The Crossing, King's Chapel (Boston), New Spectrum Foundation for Miranda Cuckson, Guerilla Opera, the International Joint Wind Quintet Project, Network for New Music (Philadelphia), The Alba Music Festival (Italy), the soundSCAPE Festival (Italy), Passepartout Duo (Berlin), Ensemble Berlin PianoPercussion, Calyx Trio, ensemberlino vocale, Kammerkoret NOVA (Oslo, Norway), Splinter Reeds, [Switch~ Ensemble], Liber, Dinosaur Annex Ensemble, the newEar Ensemble (Kansas City), TAWA Sax Quartet (Lima, Peru), The Calcutta Chamber Orchestra, internationally award-winning violinists Miclen Laipang and Linda Wang, oboist ToniMarie Marchioni, violist Leticia Oaks-Strong of the Los Angeles Philharmonic, and many others.

McLoskey has lectured and given masterclasses at over 30 schools and festivals, including the Aspen Music Festival & School, the Aspen Institute, the Tanglewood Institute, Universität der Künste Berlin, Conservatorio Nacional de Música (Mexico), and two dozen universities. He has been the Composer-in-Residence at the Alba Music Festival (Italy), the soundSCAPE festival (Italy), the Charlotte New Music Festival, the Missouri Chamber Music Festival, the Carolina Chamber Music Festival, Piccolo Spoleto Festival, and the Webster University Young Composers Workshop.

While in Boston, McLoskey was a member and then president of Composers in Red Sneakers. He has also served on the Board of Advisors of The Barlow Endowment for Music Composition, the Center for LDS Arts, and the Bogliasco Foundation.

Notable performances

International festivals to include McLoskey's music include The 2017 Huddersfield Contemporary Music Festival (UK); XXXV Foro Internacional Música Nueva, Mexico City, Mexico; The Dimlicht Festival, Antwerp, Belgium; ClarinetFest 2018 (International Clarinet Conference), Ostend, Belgium; The Gaudeamus Festival 2021, Utrecht, Belgium; Now Hear This Festival, Edmonton, Canada; International Voila Congress, Guelph, Canada; Il Jornadas Musicales de Invierno 2018 (Winter Music Days Festival), Talca, Chile; The XXX Festival de Musica Contemporànea Habana, Cuba; The I Festival Nacional de Metales de Bogotá, Colombia; Nordic Saxophone Festival, Aarhus, Denmark; The Lieksa Brass Festival, Finland; The World Saxophone Congress, Strasbourg, France; 2021 Zodiac International Music Competition, France; Amicidella Musicadi Modena AdAdM Festival, Modena, Italy; The Contrasti Festival, Trento, Italy; The Alba Music Festival, Italy; Skammdegi Festival, Ólafsfjördur, Iceland; Myrkir Músíkdagar (Dark Music Days Festival), Reykjavik, Iceland; 2020 Hovlandfestivalen, Oslo, Norway; XVIII International Jazz Festival, Lima, Peru; XVIII Ciclo de Música Contemporánea, Málaga, Spain; ENSEMS International Festival of Contemporary Music of Valencia, Spain; 2019 İTÜ/MIAM Piano Festival II, Istanbul, Turkey; 2019 ACMF (Ashburton Chamber Music Festival), Ashburton, UK.

His Suite hypnagogique was premiered by pianist Scott Holden at Carnegie Hall on June 29, 2018, as part of the Mormon Arts Center Festival. Spectrum in New York City held a two-day "McLoskey Festival" on April 15-16, 2016.

== Awards, fellowships, honors ==
- 2022 Copland House Fellow & Award
- Zealot Canticles: An Oratorio for Tolerance, 2019 GRAMMY Award for Best Choral Performance by The Crossing; Donald Nally, conductor
- The Captivity of Hannah Duston, Finalist for the 2020 AML (Association for Mormon Letters) Award for Drama
- 2019 Bogliasco Foundation Fellow
- 2nd Prize, the 2019 American Prize, for Zealot Canticles
- Winner, the 2019 Analog Choral Composition Competition
- Winner, the 2018 Boston Choral Ensemble Composition Commission Competition
- 2018 Copland House Award and recipient of their annual commission
- The 2016 American Prize for Choral Composition, for Qumran Psalms
- 2016, Winner, the Robert Avalon International Competition for Composers, for Discipline
- MacDowell Colony fellow, 2011 and 2015
- 2014, First Prize, the Red Note Festival Composition Competition, for Specific Gravity: 2.72
- 2014 GMA (Global Music Award) Bronze Medal for What We Do Is Secret
- What We Do Is Secret, first round submission for a 2013 Grammy for Best Contemporary Classical Composition
- 2013 Aaron Copland Recording Grant
- 2012, Grand Prize Winner, The Chatham Baroque Composition Competition, for Haute Dance
- The 2011 Goddard Lieberson Fellowship from the American Academy of Arts and Letters, awarded to a “composer of exceptional gifts.”
- Winner, 2011 International Joint Wind Quintet Composition Competition
- Winner, The International Music Prize for Excellence in Music Composition 2011, for What We Do Is Secret
- First Prize, 2009 Indianapolis Chamber Orchestra Composition Competition, for Requiem, v.2.001x
- Winner, 2009 “Music Now” Composition Competition, ISU New Music Festival, for Processione di lacrime
- Winner, 2009 First Annual newEar Composition Competition, for Requiem, v.2.001
- Winner, 2009 & 2010 American Composers Forum-LA Composition Competition, for Yellow and Sudden Music
- Co-Winner, The Chicago Ensemble’s Discover America IV Competition, 2001, for Wild Bells
- First Prize, SCI/ASCAP 2000 National Student Composition Competition, for Wild Bells
- The Francis Boott Prize for Vocal Works, 2000
- First Prize, 1999 Omaha Symphony Orchestra International New Music Competition, for Prex Penitentialis
- 2000 Lee Ettelson Composers Award from Composers, Inc., for Wild Bells
- 1999, First Prize, The Paris New Music Review International Competition “60 Seconds”, for Theft
- 1999, First Prize, The 5th Annual Boston Chamber Ensemble International Composition Contest, for Prex Penitentialis
- The 1999 George Arthur Knight Prize, for Tinted
- The 1998 Adelbert Sprague Prize for Orchestral Works, for Prex Penitentialis
- Charles Ives Scholarship, the American Academy of Arts and Letters, 1998
- Co-winner, 1996 Charles Ives Center Orchestral Competition, for Moraine
- Winner, 1996 ASCAP Grants to Young Composers Competition, for Occam’s Razor (cello concerto)
- First Prize, 1995 Kenneth Davenport National Competition for Orchestral Works, for Moraine
- 1991 Phi Kappa Phi Award for Creative or Scholarly Work, for Symphoniae Sacrae.

== Music ==
Significant works

Five years in the making, McLoskey’s 2017 oratorio Zealot Canticles: An Oratorio for Tolerance is the composer’s largest, most ambitious piece. Composed for the Philadelphia-based choir The Crossing, the 80-minute work calls for three soloists, choir, and chamber ensemble. When McLoskey chose the work's texts by Wole Soyinka in 2012, he did not know how timely their message of tolerance would become half a decade later. "It was really a powerful and bittersweet experience to be writing this", McLoskey said. "It felt sadly so apropos. Its message is not just about American politics. It's universal", citing the rise of open bigotry, racism, and violence since 2016.

For its timeliness and scope, McLoskey considers the oratorio his magnum opus. It was released on CD on Innova in 2018.

The most noteworthy of McLoskey’s instrumental large ensemble works is his concerto for brass quintet, What We Do Is Secret (2011). The titles of the concerto’s movements are all drawn from punk songs, though no punk music is quoted. What We Do Is Secret has a personal genesis; McLoskey has described the "formative, transforming experience" punk music had on him, saying, "Second to going on a mission, discovering punk rock changed my life more than anything else." What We Do Is Secret received several awards.

Among McLoskey’s chamber music, the 1999 duo for viola and piano, Wild Bells, stands out both for its emotional impact and its technical composition. McLoskey cites this work as the one piece that exhibits his voice in a clear way. It sits at the crossroads of all his major artistic trajectories: "(1) The use, roles, and perception of consonance and dissonance (particularly the consonant use of dissonance and the dissonant use of consonance), (2) juxtaposition and non-traditional trajectories, (3) Neo-Heterophony, and (4) the incorporation of pre-tonal concepts, music, and techniques in a contemporary setting (perhaps an inevitable result of my years involved in the performance of medieval and Renaissance repertoire)."

Though McLoskey has composed for every genre, he has a special interest in choral and vocal music. He has written for and been performed by choral ensembles including The Crossing, Cincinnati Vocal Arts Ensemble, Borg Vokal (Norway), ensemberlino vocale (Berlin), Volti, Boston Choral Ensemble, Kammerkoret NOVA (Oslo, Norway), Chorosynthesis, C4, Boston Secession, Tapestry, Liber, NOTUS (the Indiana University Contemporary Vocal Ensemble), the Melbourne Chamber Choir (Australia), and The Hilliard Ensemble.

A noteworthy choral work is You Have a Name and a Place (2019), a choral cycle commissioned by Boston Choral Ensemble as the winner of its 2018 International Composition Competition. The three-movement work sets texts by and about gay Mormons and was premiered by Stare At The Sun (Chicago) in March 2022, after a two-year delay caused by the COVID-19 pandemic.

Many of McLoskey's works deal with social justice, politics, and human rights, including Agitprop, Resist, post/resist, Zealot Canticles, You Have a Name and a Place, and The Task Ahead Is Enormous, and There Is Not Much Time.

Much of McLoskey's work—both instrumental and vocal—is sacred in nature, albeit for non-liturgical use. McLoskey draws little distinction between "sacred" and "secular" music. Examples of significant sacred works are Symphoniæ Sacræ, an orchestral setting of various sacred texts; Prex Penitentialis: The Prayer of Petrarch—commissioned by the N.E.A. for soprano and orchestra, and the winner of three awards including the Omaha Symphony Orchestra International New Music Competition and the 5th Annual Boston Chamber Ensemble International Composition Contest, setting excepts of Petrarch's "Septem psalmi penitentialis” and “Canzoniere”; and […]Qumran Psa[lms…], a choral cycle for triple choir, setting fragments of lost psalms from the Dead Sea Scrolls, commissioned by ensemberlino vocale and awarded the 2016 American Prize for Choral Composition.

His 50-minute work for mezzo-soprano and sinfonietta One Book Called Ulysses (2022) was commissioned by Network for New Music, the Barlow Endowment, and the Musical Fund of Philadelphia for the 100th anniversary of James Joyce's Ulysses.

His opera The Captivity of Hannah Duston (2020), with a libretto by Glen Nelson, was commissioned by the Barlow Endowment and Guerilla Opera (Boston).

== Selected work list ==
Large ensemble, concerti, opera

- Symphoniæ Sacræ (1991) - orchestra
- Occam's razor (1992, rev. 2018) - cello concerto
- Moraine (1995) - orchestra
- Prex Penitentiales: The Prayer of Petrarch (1997) - soprano & chamber orchestra
- Chanson pour cordes (1999) - string orchestra
- Requiem, v.2.001x (2001) - orchestra
- SLAM! (2007) - orchestra
- What We Do Is Secret (2011) - concerto for brass quintet & wind ensemble
- Zealot Canticles: An Oratorio for Tolerance (2017) - soprano, mezzo, baritone soloists, SATB, clarinet, SATB
- …que la tierra se partió por su sonido (2018) - concerto for flute & flute ensemble
- post/resist (2020) - orchestra, electronics
- The Captivity of Hannah Duston (2020) - opera w/libretto by Glen Nelson
- One Book Called Ulysses (2022) - mezzo-soprano & sinfonietta/chamber orchestra
- I Heard the Children Singing (2023) - violin concerto

Chamber works

- flux in situ (1989, rev. 1991) - string quartet
- Star Chamber (1992) - solo violin
- Rosetta Stone (1995) - fl, cl, vn or vla, vc, pno, perc
- Plaindance (1996) - ob/eng, cl, vla, vc, cb
- Theft (1996) - piano (w/speaking pianist)
- Tinted (1998) - piano trio
- zámbáah (1998) - fl/a.fl, cl, vn, vc, pno
- Wild Bells (1999) - viola & piano
- Glaze (2000) - brass quintet & drum kit
- Requiem, v.2.001 (2000) - fl, cl, vn, vc, pno, perc
- Glisten (2004) - piano trio
- B(ee) Movie (2007) - cello, marimba, video
- OK-OK (2006) - sax quartet
- Yellow (2006) - fl, cl, vn, vc, pno
- The Madding Crowd (2007) - brass quintet
- Catherine's Wheel (2007) - violin, marimba
- Quartettrope (2008) - cl, a.sax, vn, pno
- blur (2009) - clarinet and basset horn or alto sax
- Sudden Music (2009) - song cycle for soprano & piano
- Processione di lacrime (2009) - a.sax, vn, vla, vc
- Hardwood (2011) - wind quintet
- Specific Gravity: 2.72 (2012) - fl, cl, a.sax, vn, vc, perc
- Haute Dance (2012) - Baroque violin, tenor viola da gamba, and theorbo
- Rite (2014) - two pianos & two percussion
- Two (2015) - solo violin
- Discipline (2015) - oboe & piano
- Whirl (2015) - clarinet & alto sax
- Sikurtawa (2015) - sax quartet
- Agitprop (2017) - bass clarinet, marimba, electronics
- This Will Not Be Loud and Relentless (2017) - muted piano & muted snare drum
- #playlist (2018) - reed quintet
- Suite hypnagogique (2018) - solo piano
- Mühlfeldtänze (2018) - clarinet quintet
- The Task Ahead is Enormous, and There is Not Much Time (2020) - piccolo, violin, piano, percussion
- Sarabande (2024) - violin, alto sax, piano, and three painters (optional)

Choral and vocal works

- Non avrá ma’ pieta (1991) - solo SATTBB voices
- O mira novitas (1999) - solo SSA voices
- Solsange (2001) - solo SAT voices
- Breake, blowe, burn (2001) - SATB, 2 percussion
- Riddle (2001) - solo ATTB voices
- Burning Chariots (2003) - SATB
- Venite, sancti venite (2009) - SATB
- The Memory of Rain (2010) - SATB & organ
- Unreal City (2011) - soprano, piano, percussion
- Zealot Canticle (2011) - SATB w/clarinet
- Dear World (2015) - SATB
- […]Qumran Psa[lms…] (2015) - SATB (triple choir)
- You Have a Name and a Place (2019) - SATB
- Sette grime på natta ("Harnessing the Night") (2019) - SATB (in Norwegian)
- On Fire Today (2021) - baritone & string quartet
- Shout in the Street (2022) - mezzo-soprano, flute, and piano
- One Book Called Ulysses (2022) - mezzo-soprano & sinfonietta

McLoskey’s music is published by Theodore Presser Company, Inc., American Composers Alliance Press (ACA), Marimba Productions, Inc., Odhecaton Z Music, and Subito Music Publishing.

== Discography ==
Solo or "featured" CDs

- Zealot Canticles (Innova Recordings #984), 2018
- Specific Gravity: Chamber Music by Lansing McLoskey (Albany Records TROY1443), 2013
- The Unheard Music: New American Music for Wind Ensemble and Brass (Albany Records, TROY1442), 2013
- Sixth Species (Albany Records, TROY1044), 2008. CD of McLoskey's chamber music.

Works on compilation discs

- Kammerkoret NOVA: Of Light and Dust (LAWO, LAWO1168.2), 2019. Includes Dear World.
- Analog Chorale: Explorers (Avant-Garde), 2019. Includes Dear World.
- Frost Symphony Orchestra Live (Albany Records TROY1750), 2018. Includes Chanson pour cordes.
- Rita Blitt: Visions of My World” DVD (Equilibrium/Soundset, DVD06, NSR-1000407), 2014. Includes blur.
- Citizens of Nowhere (Albany Records, TROY1439), 2013. Includes blur.
- An American Dream/Prex Penitentialis (Albany Records, TROY1258) 2011. Includes Prex Penitentialis.
- Metamorphosis (Beauport Classical, BC1805), 2009. Includes Star Chamber.
- Glisten (Albany Records, TROY886), 2006. Includes Glisten.
- Mormoniana (Tantara Records/Mormon Artists Group), 2004. Includes Untitled (Corner Grid).
- Cornucopia (Capstone Records), 2003. Includes Breake, blowe, burn.
- Don't Panic! 60 Seconds for Piano (Wergo Schallplatten), 2001
- Cultivated Choruses (Capstone Records), 2000. Includes Non avrá ma' pieta.

== Publications ==
McLoskey published a book, Twentieth Century Danish Music, that serves as a research guide on the topic. His research on the subject was awarded the Haug Prize for Scandinavian Studies.
