= Scott Wheeler (composer) =

American composer

Scott Wheeler is an American concert-music composer, born February 24, 1952, in Washington, D.C., now based in Boston, Massachusetts. Since 1989, he has been on the faculty of Emerson College in Boston, where he has co-directed the music theater program. Wheeler co-founded (with Rodney Lister and Ezra Sims) and for many years was artistic director of the Dinosaur Annex Music Ensemble, of which he remains artistic adviser. As an active conductor and an advocate for the music of his colleagues, he has led numerous world and local premieres and recorded several compact discs. Wheeler is on the board of directors of the Virgil Thomson Foundation, a composer advocacy group. He attended Amherst College, the New England Conservatory, and Brandeis University and counts Virgil Thomson among his teachers. He was also a Fellow of the Tanglewood Music Center and in 1988 was awarded a Guggenheim Fellowship.

Scott Wheeler is best known as the composer of vocal and theater music. In February 2006, he was one of several composers selected as part of the Metropolitan Opera/Lincoln Center Theater commissioning project for a new operatic work. Wheeler collaborates with his librettist, the playwright Romulus Linney. This project is ongoing as of fall 2010. His major dramatic works include his opera Democracy, An American Comedy, written in collaboration with Linney on commission from Washington National Opera. Democracy premiered at Kennedy Center in 2005. His dramatic cantata The Construction of Boston (1988), setting a libretto by the poet Kenneth Koch (1925–2002), was recorded for the Naxos Records label by the Boston Cecilia. That piece was commissioned by the John Oliver Chorale and was premiered in 1989.

Wheeler has written music in most concert genres from solo pieces to orchestral. Commissions have come from such groups and organizations as the Koussevitzky Foundation, the Fromm Foundation, the Minnesota Orchestra, Boston Cecilia, and Sequitur, among many others. His Sunday Songs, two songs on texts of Emily Dickinson, were premiered by soprano Renée Fleming in 2000 at New York's Alice Tully Hall.

Recent works include his Heaven and Earth, settings of William Blake's works commissioned by the Marilyn Horne Foundation, which was premiered at Carnegie Hall's Weill Recital Hall in 2008, and the chamber symphony City of Shadows, commissioned by the Deutsches Symphonie-Orchester Berlin and Kent Nagano as part of a portrait concert of Wheeler's work. His piano trio The Granite Coast, commissioned by the Rockport Chamber Music Society (Rockport, MA) for the opening of their new Shalin Liu Performance Center, was premiered in Rockport in June 2010. A compact disc of song recordings, Wasting the Night, was released by Naxos in 2010.

Wheeler's particular concern as a composer is vocal and dramatic music. As such, he has a wide knowledge of and interest in poetry, and in addition to Kenneth Koch, he has set texts from authors ranging from St. Theresa of Avila to Wallace Stevens and Mark Van Doren. His vocal settings evoke natural speech rhythms and contours, called by Boston Globe critic Jeremy Eichler "transparent and elegant."
