= Dinosaur Annex Music Ensemble =

- Origin: Boston, Massachusetts
- Genre: chamber music
- Years active: 1975––present
- Website: www.dinosaurannex.org

Dinosaur Annex Music Ensemble is a contemporary chamber music ensemble based in Boston, Massachusetts. The group was founded in 1975 by composers Scott Wheeler, Rodney Lister, and Ezra Sims as the concert-giving “annex” of New England Dinosaur Dance Theater. The ensemble has been independently incorporated since 1977.

The ensemble is currently directed by Co-Artistic Directors Hubert Ho and Felicia Chen. Recent directors include Wheeler, Sue-Ellen Hershman-Tcherepnin, Yu-Hui Chang, and Emily Koh. Members include Donald Berman, piano; Gabriela Diaz, violin; Anne Black, viola/violin; Rafael Popper-Keizer, cello; Diane Heffner, clarinets/sax; Hershman-Tcherepnin, flute; Katherine V. Matasy, clarinets/sax/accordion; and Robert Schulz, percussion. The group's core musicians perform regularly with the Boston Symphony, Boston Pops, Boston Lyric Opera, Boston Ballet, Handel and Haydn, Pro Arte Chamber Orchestra, and in Boston's Broadway theater productions. Notable guest performers and conductors include Gunther Schuller, Lorraine Hunt, John Harbison, D'Anna Fortunato, Pamela Dellal, and Pascal Verrot.

Dinosaur Annex Music Ensemble has commissioned works by many composers, including Mark Berger, Martin Boykan, Dana Brayton, Jeffery Brooks, Richard Busch, Robert Ceely, Shih-Hui Chen, Tamar Diesendruck, Tom Flaherty, Lee Hyla, David Lang, Arthur Levering, Ruth Lomon, Lansing McLoskey, John McDonald, Malcolm Peyton, David Rakowski, Laurie San Martin, James Russel Smith, Kurt Stallmann, Lewis Spratlan, Peter Van Zandt Lane, Donald Wheelock, and Evan Ziporyn.

== Discography ==
- Peter Homans, A Prague Spring, 2007 (MMC)
- Donald Martino, Quintino, 2007 (Navona)
- Martin Boykan, Piano Trio no. 2, 1999 (CRI)
- Martin Boykan, Flume, 2002 (CRI)
- Lee Hyla, String Trio, 1983 (CRI)
- Ian Krouse, Tientos, 1997 (Koch International)
- Arthur Levering, Still Raining, Still Dreaming, 2005 (New World)
- Arthur Levering, School of Velocity, 1994 (CRI)
- Scott Lindroth, Human Gestures, 1998 (CRI)
- David Liptak, Ancient Songs, 2004 (Bridge)
- Malcolm Peyton, Songs from T. Sturge Moore (Centuar)
- Ezra Sims, Come Away, 1986 (CRI)
- Ezra Sims, Quintet for Clarinet and Strings, 1991 (CRI)
- Robert Sirota, Seven Pocassos, 1988 (Capstone)
- Dinosaur Annex: Thirty Years of Adventure, 1975–2005
