= Shih-Hui Chen =

Taiwanese composer

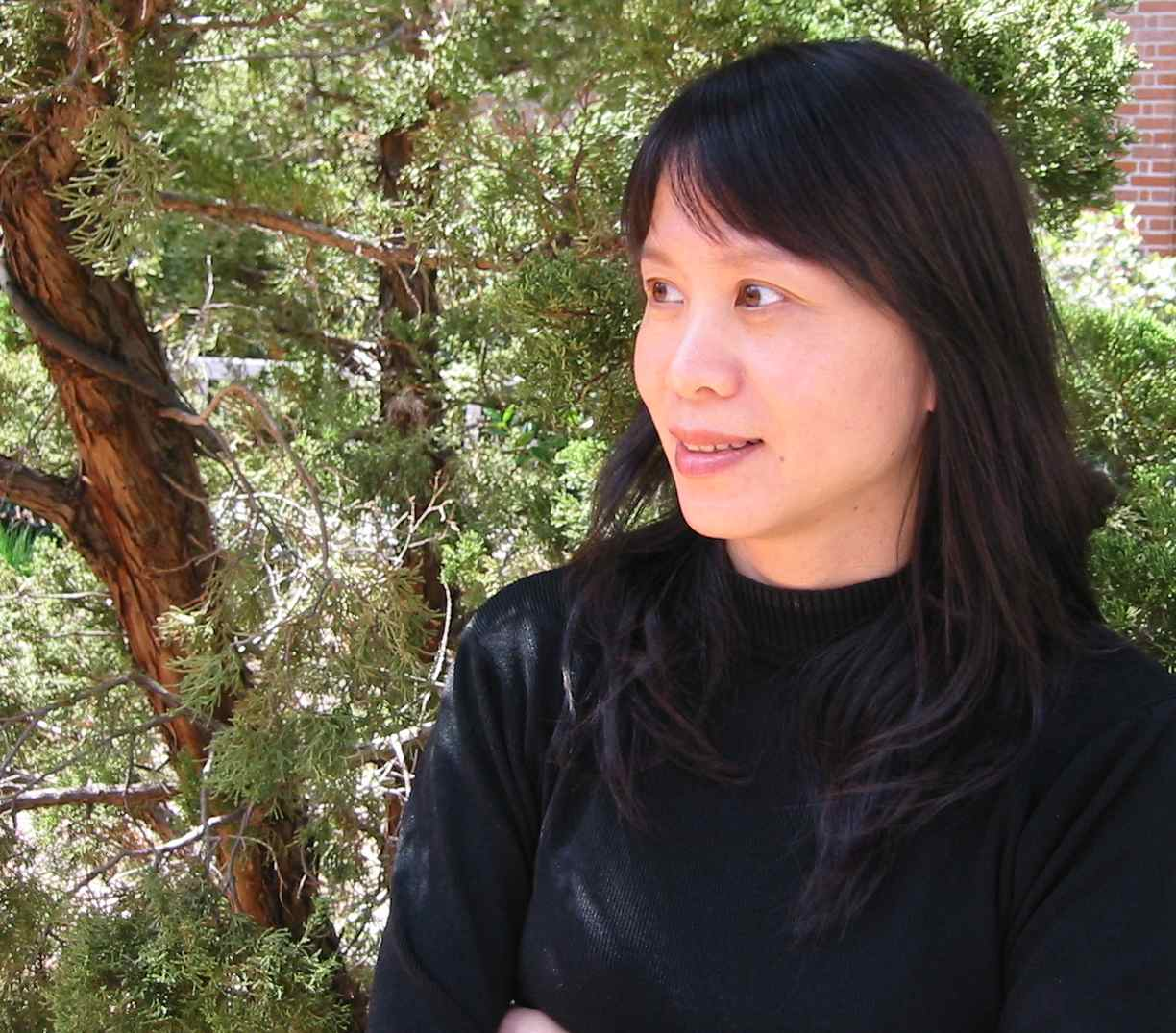
Chen in 2006

Shih-Hui Chen (Chinese: 陳士惠; born 1962) is a Taiwanese composer who lives and works in the United States.

== Biography ==
Chen Shih-hui (陳士惠) was born in Taipei, Taiwan, and came to the United States in 1982 to study for a master's degree from Northern Illinois University and a doctoral degree from Boston University. After receiving her D.M.A. in music composition, Shih-Hui Chen took a position at the Shepherd School of Music, Rice University where she is currently Professor of Music Composition and Theory. Chen also serves on Asia Society Texas Center's Performing Arts & Culture Committee and is the director of 21C: Classical, Contemporary, and Cross-Cultural Music Festival at Rice University.

Chen Shih-hui's work has been performed widely throughout the U.S. and abroad, including Taiwan, China, Germany, and Italy. In 1999, she received an American Academy in Rome Prize, a Guggenheim Fellowship in 2000, and a Goddard Lieberson Fellowship from the American Academy of Arts and Letters in 2007. In 2010, Chen received a Fulbright Fellowship to study traditional Chinese Music, Nanguan music, and music of Taiwanese Indigenous peoples.

== Work ==
=== Musical style ===
Chen Shih-hui composes for orchestra, chamber ensemble, voice, and solo instruments. She also composes music for theater and film.

Her music blends both her Western training and cultural heritage. A citation accompanying her 2007 Goddard Lieberson Fellowship from the American Academy of Arts and Letters states: “Among the composers of Asian descent living in the U.S.A., Shih-Hui Chen is most successful in balancing the very refined spectral traditions of the East with the polyphonic practice of Western art-music. In a seamless narrative, her beautiful music, always highly inventive and expressive, is immediately as appealing as it is demanding and memorable.”

=== Selected recent compositions ===
- Messages from a Formosan Village (2019)
- Echoes from Within: A Musical Response to Cy Twombly for sheng, contrabass and electronics (2018)
- Withhold the Umbrella for Chinese Orchestra (2018)
- Flashback Moments for piano quartet (2018)
- The Pilgrimage for Acapella Chorus (2017)
- Ascending Waves for large orchestra (2017)
- Silvergrass, Cello and Chamber Orchestra or Ensemble (2016)
- Ten Thousand Blooms, Falling Petals for Traditional Korean Orchestra or ensemble (2015)
- Fantasia on the Theme of Guanlingsan for Zheng and Chinese Chamber Orchestra or Ensemble (2014, 2015)
- A Plea to Lady Chang’e for Nanguan Pipa and String Quartet or Orchestra (2013, 2014)
- Returning Souls: Four Short Pieces on Three Formosan Amis Legends for Solo Violin or String Quartet (2011, 2013)
- Our Names, for Narrator and Chamber Ensemble (2010)
- Returnings, for Flute, Percussion and Cello (2010)
- Fantasia on the Theme of Plum Blossoms for String Quartet (2007–9)

== Distinctions ==
- Barlow Endowment Commission (2001).
- Bunting Institute Fellowship at the Radcliffe Institute for Advanced Study (1996).
- Fulbright Fellowship (2010) for study of traditional Chinese Music, Nanguan music, and music of the Taiwanese aboriginal people.
- Fromm Music Foundation Commission (1995).
- Goddard Lieberson Fellowship, American Academy of Arts and Letters (2007).
- Koussevitzky Music Foundation Commission (2004).
- John Simon Guggenheim Fellowship (2000).
- Rome Prize, The American Academy in Rome, Italy (1999).
