= Roger Bourland =

American composer, professor of music, publisher and blogger (born 1952)

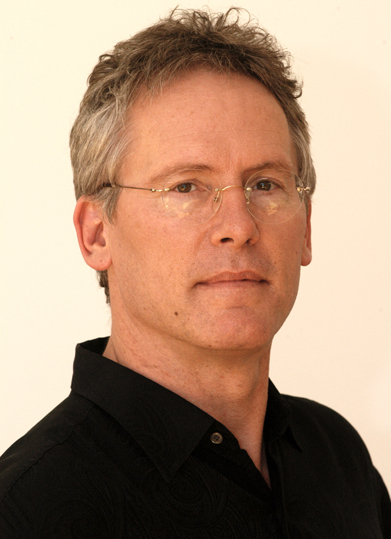
Roger Bourland in 2006

Roger Bourland (born December 13, 1952) is an American composer, publisher, blogger, and Professor-Emeritus of Music at the UCLA Herb Alpert School of Music.

== Biography ==
Born in Evanston, Illinois, Bourland received a Bachelor of Music in Music Theory and Composition (1976) from the University of Wisconsin, Madison, studying with Leslie Thimmig and Randall Snyder; a Master of Music in Music Composition (1978) from the New England Conservatory of Music, studying with William Thomas McKinley and Donald Martino; and a Master of Arts and Ph.D. in Music Composition from Harvard University, studying with Randall Thompson, Earl Kim and Leon Kirchner.

Bourland studied at Tanglewood with Gunther Schuller and was awarded the Koussevitzky Prize in Composition (1978). Other awards include the John Knowles Paine Fellowship (Harvard), two ASCAP Grants to Young Composers, numerous Meet the Composers grants, and was a co-founder of the Boston-based consortium "Composers in Red Sneakers." Bourland has composed over one hundred fifty works for all media: film, solo, instrumental, chamber, vocal and choral music, electro-acoustic music, and music for orchestra, wind ensemble, and other large ensembles.

From 1983 to 2013, Bourland taught composition, music theory, analysis, orchestration, electro-acoustic composition, and other classes and seminars in the UCLA Herb Alpert School of Music. He was awarded the UCLA Distinguished Teaching Award for 2005–6, and served as Chair of the UCLA Herb Alpert School of Music, Department of Music from 2007 to 2011. Professor Bourland retired from UCLA in 2013 and moved to Northern California to devote his time to composition.

The Yelton Rhodes Music catalog, along with Bourland's compositions, was sold to Subito Music Corporation in 2022.

== Selected compositions ==
=== OPERA ===
YEAR	TITLE	LIBRETTO	PUBLISHER
2015-19; unfinished	Smoking Mirror	Mitchell Bryan Morris	Yelton Rhodes Music
2014	The Dove and the Nightingale [La paloma y el ruiseñor]	Mitchell Bryan Morris; Spanish adaptation by Plácido Domingo Jr.	Yelton Rhodes Music
2007	Flight into Egypt	Thornton Wilder	Yelton Rhodes Music

BALLET
YEAR	TITLE	STORY	CHOREOGRAPHER
2018	Frida and the Smoking Mirror	Based upon a story by Mitchell Morris	Zoíla Fernandez
2017	La Paloma y el Ruiseñor	Based up the libretto by Mitchell Morris	Zoíla Fernandez

MUSICAL THEATER
YEAR	TITLE	STORY	COMMISSIONER
2009	Homer in Cyberspace	Book and lyrics by Mel Shapiro	UCLA REMAP

- Homer in Cyberspace (2009) Book and lyrics by Mel Shapiro (music theater)

=== Cantatas ===
- The Crocodile's Christmas Ball and other odd tales (2002) for chorus, soloists and wind ensemble; lyrics by William MacDuff
- Rosarium (1999) for soloists, chorus and orchestra; libretto by William MacDuff
- Flashpoint/Stonewall (1994) for chorus, soloists, four synthesizers, bass and drums; libretto by John Hall
- Letters to the Future (1993) for chorus, soloists, three synthesizers, bass and drums; poems by Francisco X. Alarcón, May Swenson, Adrienne Rich, Allen Ginsberg, James Merrill, J. D. McClatchy and Thom Gunn
- Hidden Legacies (1992) for chorus, soloists, four synthesizers, bass and drums; libretto by John Hall

=== Orchestra, Chamber orchestra, Wind ensemble ===
- El Ruisenor Mexicano (2016) for orchestra
- Poem (2006) for piano and orchestra
- The Night Train (2004) for marimba, tom-toms, violin, viola, violoncello, double bass, flute and alto flute, harp, and strings
- Trauermusik (2003) for wind ensemble (By W.A Mozart, orchestrated by Roger Bourland)
- Ozma (1996) for orchestra; orchestration for wind ensemble (2003)
- Mirabell Jam (1992) for orchestra
- Rivers in the Sky (1988) for wind ensemble
- Scenes from Gauguin (1987) for orchestra
- Broken Arrows (1986) for EVI and EWI instruments designed by Nyle Steiner (EVI), four Yamaha DX7s, and jazz ensemble
- Serenade No.1: Far in the Night (1983) for soprano saxophone, bassoon, harp, and strings
- Cantilena (1983) for string orchestra
- Scenes from Redon (1982) for orchestra
- Sweet Alchemy (1980) for orchestra
- Clarinet Rhapsody (1979) for clarinet and orchestra
- Jackson Pollock in Memoriam (1978) for orchestra

=== Choral music ===
- Healy Madrigals (2009) for SSAA; poems by Eloise Klein Healy
- Alarcón Madrigals, Book 3 (2006) for SSAA; poems by Francisco X. Alarcón
- A More Perfect Union (2005) for TTBB and piano; lyrics by Philip Littell
- Alarcón Madrigals, Book 2 (2002) for SSAA; poems by Francisco X. Alarcón
- Keeping the Ocean Free (2000) for SATB and piano; lyrics by William MacDuff
- Spiritual Gifts (2000) for SATB and organ; lyrics by Roger Bourland
- Fa La La (Blah, Blah, Blah) (1998) for TTBB, SATB, or SSAA and piano; lyrics by William MacDuff
- Look Behind our Song (1996) for TTBB, and piano; lyrics by John Hall
- The Acts of Love (1995) for men's chorus; poem by Michael J. Lafferty
- Alarcón Madrigals, Book 1 (1993) for SSAA or SATB; poems by Francisco X. Alarcón
- All there is is love (1993) for TTBB; text by Paul Monette
- The Son of God Was Singing (1987) for SATB and organ or piano; lyrics by Roger Bourland
- Christmas Introit (1987) for SATB and organ or piano; lyrics by Roger Bourland
- Dickinson Madrigals, Book 3 (1985) for TTBB; poems by Emily Dickinson
- Psalm 47, a setting of Psalm 47 (1983) for SATB
- His Spirit Lives (1983) for SATB; poem by Amos Niven Wilder
- Antiphon (1983) for SATB; poem by George Herbert
- Dickinson Madrigals, Book 2 (1983) for SSAA; poems by Emily Dickinson
- Dickinson Madrigals, Book 1 (1980) for SSAA; poems by Emily Dickinson
- Twelve New Hymns (1980) for SATB; lyrics by Gary Bachlund
- Garden Abstract (1976) for SSSAAA (2 sopranos, 2 mezzo-sopranos, 2 altos); poem by Hart Crane
- Three Clouds (1975) for mixed chorus; lyrics by Roger Bourland

(For large-scale choral works, see Cantatas below)

=== Chamber music ===
- Four Poets (2005) for string quartet
- Emily (2005) for string quartet, bass, and banjo
- Four Painters (2001) for violin, viola, cello, piano
- Stories We Tell (1998) for four cellos
- American Baroque (1992) for violin, cello, piano
- Three Arias (1989) for viola or cello and piano
- Recent Dreams (1989) for horn, violin, piano
- Aesop, the Peasant (1987) for speaker, flute, clarinet, violin, cello, piano; texts by V.A. Kolve
- Serenade No.2: Paintings (1986) for violin, cello, piano, flute, clarinet in Bb
- Saxophone Quintet (1984) for soprano saxophone, string quartet
- Montana Suite (1984) for string quartet
- Dances from the Sacred Harp (1983) for flute, alto fl. in G, piccolo, clarinet in Bb, piano, violin, viola, cello, percussion
- Nostos (1982) for flute, alto flute, clarinet, bass clarinet, soprano saxophone, alto saxophone
- Stone Quartet (1982) for soprano sax, viola, cello, and piano
- Cantilena (1981) for flute, soprano sax, or clarinet in Bb and organ
- Three Dark Paintings (1981) for strings, soprano sax, viola and piano
- The Death of Narcissus (1980) for piano, strings, and wind ensemble
- Beowulf Trio (1979) for flute, violin, cello
- Personae (1978) for cello, bass (in solo tuning)
- Seven Pollock Paintings (1978) for flute, clarinet, soprano saxophone, bass clarinet, tam tam, violin, viola, cello, bass

=== Songs ===
YEAR	TITLE	INSTRUMENTATION	TEXTS	PUBLISHER
2006	Four Marian Songs	voice, piano	William MacDuff	Yelton Rhodes Music
2005	Four Xmas Songs	voice, piano	William MacDuff	Yelton Rhodes Music
2003	Four Apart-Songs	voice, piano	Roger Bourland, William MacDuff, Francisco X. Alarcón, and James Patrick Kelly	Yelton Rhodes Music
2003	Four EndSongs	voice, piano	Emily Dickinson, Thom Gunn, Allen Ginsberg, and Francisco X. Alarcón	Yelton Rhodes Music

=== Keyboard music ===
YEAR	TITLE	INSTRUMENTATION	PUBLISHER
2009	Three Impromptus	piano	Yelton Rhodes Music
2001	Five Miniatures	piano	Yelton Rhodes Music
1998	Garlands	carillon	Yelton Rhodes Music
1990	St. Stephen Counterpoint	organ	Yelton Rhodes Music
1985	Morning Sonata	organ	ECS Publishing
1981	Cantilena	flute, organ	ECS Publishing
1977	Ides, Book 3	piano	Yelton Rhodes Music
1975	Ides, Book 2	piano	Yelton Rhodes Music
1974	Preludes, Book 1	piano	Yelton Rhodes Music
1974	Ides, Book 1	piano	Yelton Rhodes Music

=== Composer for Motion Pictures and TV ===
YEAR	TITLE	PRODUCTION CO	DIRECTOR	WRITER	DISTRIBUTION CO
2009	INFRARED	Steakhaus Productions	Mel Shapiro	Mel Shapiro	Steakhaus Productions
2007	POSSUM DEATH SPREE 3	Atomfilms Studio	Michael Horowitz, Gareth Smith	Michael Horowitz, Gareth Smith	
2007	POSSUM DEATH SPREE 2	Atomfilms Studio	Michael Horowitz, Gareth Smith	Michael Horowitz, Gareth Smith	
2007	POSSUM DEATH SPREE 1	Atomfilms Studio	Michael Horowitz, Gareth Smith	Michael Horowitz, Gareth Smith	
2007	CAGES	Imperative Pictures	Graham Streeter	Graham Streeter	Golden Village Entertainment
2003	DOPPELGÄNGER	Jason Moskovitz | Jessica Rhoades	Michael Horowitz, Gareth Smith	Michael Horowitz	
2000	OUT OF TRUST	Loyola Productions, Inc	Eddie Siebert	Eddie Siebert	Loyola Productions, Inc
2000	LUCE, TEMPO, ROMA	Cameron McNall	Cameron McNall	Cameron McNall	Cameron McNall
1990	VOICES FROM SANDOVER	Peter Hooten	Joan Darling	James Merrill	Washington University Film & Media Archive
1989	NIGHT LIFE	Creative Movie Marketing	David Acomba	Keith Critchlow	RCA/Columbia Pictures Home Video
1987	WOLF AT THE DOOR (OVIRI)	Caméras Continentales	Henning Carlsen	Christopher Hampton	California Pictures
1986	THE TROUBLE WITH DICK	Frolix	Gary Walkow	Gary Walkow	Gary Walkow
