= Molly Joyce =

American composer, performer, artist and academic

- Born: 1992 (age 33–34); Pittsburgh, PA

Molly Joyce is a composer, performer, and recording artist. She is currently a PhD student in Composition and Computer Technologies at the University of Virginia and teaches music production and orchestration at Berklee Online.

== Early life and education ==
Molly Joyce was born in 1992 in Pittsburgh, PA. She started her instrumental music education on the violin. After a car accident permanently damaged her left hand at the age of 7, she began playing the cello by using her left hand for the bow and right hand on the fingerboard. She also learned to play the trumpet and began composing on the computer.

Joyce attended The Juilliard School for her undergraduate degree (graduating with scholastic distinction). She also earned degrees at Royal Conservatory in The Hague, where she was the recipient of the Frank Huntington Beebe Fund Grant, and Yale School of Music.

Joyce has studied with Samuel Adler, Martin Bresnick, Guus Janssen, David Lang, Han Lash, Missy Mazzoli, Martijn Padding, Christopher Rouse, and Christopher Theofanidis.

== Career ==
Joyce has contributed compositions to many recordings of other artists. As a solo artist, she released an EP, Lean Back and Release, in 2017 and an LP titled Breaking and Entering in 2020. Among her many live performances was a talk and performance given at TedxMidAtlantic in 2017.

== Disability and composition style ==
After the car crash that deformed her left hand, Joyce began to explore ways to be musical that accommodated her disability. In graduate school, Joyce began an independent study on disability and the arts. During this study, she found that her disabled hand allowed her to create distinct music that incorporated the differing abilities of her hands. Consequently, her view of ability and disability developed, viewing them not as a dichotomy but as a spectrum that affords opportunities to people based on their individual capabilities.

Her primary instrument is a vintage Magnus Electric Chord Organ Model 391, which she found in 2011 after years of searching for an instrument that would fit her body, with individual chord buttons placed on the left side and a small piano keyboard on the right. Joyce realized that the instrument was “made for my form and made for my deform.”

Joyce’s musical style is not only influenced by her disability, but by other musical genres such as Minimalism, Impressionism, and Jazz. Joyce has composed for large ensembles, chamber groups, and soloists.

== Discography ==
=== LPs ===
Year	Title	Artist	Notes	Label
2025	State Change	Molly Joyce		
2023	Evolution Of Perception	Molly Joyce		
2022	Perspective	Molly Joyce		
2020	Breaking and Entering	Molly Joyce	Described as “debut full-length album voice, vintage toy organ, and electronics in exploring breaking and entering into a new body and disability.”	New Amsterdam Records

=== EPs ===
Year	Title	Artist	Notes	Label
2017	Lean Back and Release	Molly Joyce	Two tracks for solo violin with live and pre-recorded electronics	New Amsterdam Records

=== As contributing composer ===
Year	Title	Artist	Notes	Label
2020	STICKLIP	Bec Plexus	Joyce composed track “think out loud”	New Amsterdam Records
2020	Dawn Chorus	Grand Valley State University (GVSU) New Music Ensemble	Joyce composed the track “Bite the Dust”	Innova Recordings
2020	Caustics	Evan Chapman	Joyce composed the track “Crash and Burn”	
2018	On Behalf	Brianna Matzke & Hajnal Pivnick	Joyce composed the track “Down and Out”	
2017	Petits Artéfacts	Nick Photinos	Joyce composed the track “Sit and Dance”	New Amsterdam Records
2016	A O R T A	Vicky Chow	Joyce composed the track “Rave”	New Amsterdam Records
