= Hobart Earle =

Venezuelan-born conductor (born 1960)

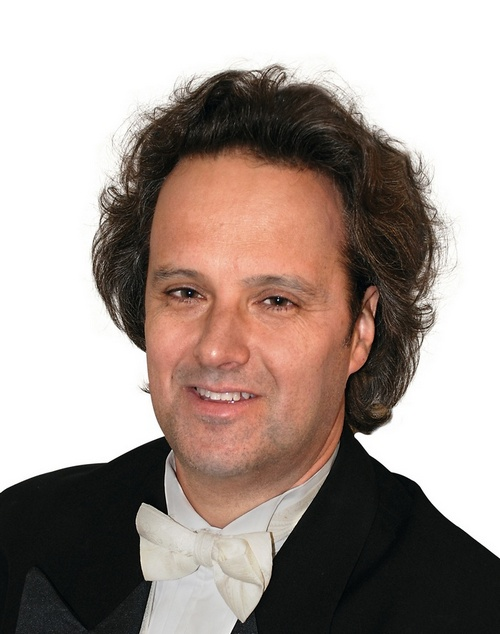
- Earle in 2013
- Born: December 20, 1960 (age 65); Caracas, Venezuela
- Occupation: Conductor
- Years active: 1991–present
- Awards: People's Artist of Ukraine

Hobart Earle (born December 20, 1960) is a Venezuelan-born conductor of American descent and People's Artist of Ukraine recipient.

== Education ==
Hobart Earle was born and raised in Caracas, Venezuela. He attended Gordonstoun School in Scotland and Princeton University in New Jersey. He also attended the University of Music and Performing Arts in Vienna, Austria. At Princeton, he studied composition and music theory with Milton Babbitt, Edward Cone, Claudio Spies, and Paul Lansky. During his years in Vienna he was a member of the Vienna Singverein, and took part in performances and recordings under Herbert von Karajan, Lorin Maazel and many others.

Earle speaks seven languages.

== Conductor ==
Earle became well known for conducting the Odesa Philharmonic Orchestra at the Odesa Philharmonic Theater. He elevated the orchestra to a position of international prominence, appearing in such concert halls in Europe as London's Barbican Centre, the Beethovenhalle in Bonn, Philharmonie in Cologne, Franz Liszt Academy of Music of Budapest, Vienna Musikverein, National Auditorium of Madrid the Great Halls of both Moscow and Saint Petersburg Conservatories and in the United States at the John F. Kennedy Center for the Performing Arts in Washington, DC, Carnegie Hall in New York, Chicago's Symphony Center, Davies Hall in San Francisco and the United Nations General Assembly.

As a guest conductor, he appeared with such as orchestras in Europe as Vienna Chamber and Tonkünstler Orchestra, the Noord Nederlands Orkest in the Netherlands, the Krakow Philharmonic and Sinfonia Iuventus in Poland, the Bilbao Orkestra Sinfonikoa and Athens State Symphony, Orchestra della Toscana and Orchestra Sinfonica Siciliana in Italy, the Odense Symfoniorkester in Denmark, and the Jerusalem Symphony Orchestra. In the United States, he has led such orchestras as Buffalo and Florida Philharmonics, the Orchestra Nova San Diego and North Carolina Symphony and in Russia, the Russian State Symphony Orchestra ('Svetlanov Symphony Orchestra'), the 'Novaya Rossiya' State Symphony Orchestra, the Russian National Orchestra, the Russian Philharmonic Orchestra and the Moscow State Symphony Orchestra, as well as at the Philharmonic in St. Petersburg.[5] In Asia, he has been a guest of the Taipei Symphony Orchestra, the Thailand Philharmonic Orchestra, and the Southeast Asian Youth Orchestra.

Despite Earle's broad success with elevating the quality level of the Odesa Philharmonic Orchestra, he has publicly criticized the local government for its lack of support. In an interview with Vladislav Davidzon, editor of The Odessa Review, he explained that the orchestra was forced to be self-sufficient in the face of a lack of support:

"We even did dental work for wind players so that they could continue to play fifteen years ago. It turned out to be a very important issue, I had one horn player who had a number of teeth pulled by an idiot dentist and so he could not put his dentures in and was completely unable to play. We were very fortunate and found a French-Swiss dentist who told us he could fix this. Our man is still playing the horn, his son is our principal horn player. While we were at it, we decided to do the same for all the other wind players as they all had serious dental issues."

His festival credits include the Bregenz, Budapest, and Lugano Spring Festivals as well as Perth International and Nuits Musicales du Suquet in Cannes, among others. At the Greek National Opera in Athens, he conducted new productions of The Snow Queen and Don Quixote.

While conducting the State Academic Symphony Orchestra of the Russian Federation in Moscow he received a message on June 27, 2013 that the President of Ukraine had signed a decree naming him People's Artist of Ukraine. Thereafter he had an interview with Kyivan American Embassy where he talked about his friendship with Bohdan Stupka.

== Recordings ==
He has recorded works by such composers as Mykola Kolessa, Myroslav Skoryk, Yevhen Stankovych and Reinhold Gliere that were not previously recorded. He also conducted world premiere recordings of compositions by Henry Gilbert, George Whitefield Chadwick, Theodor Berger, Miguel del Aguila, and Igor Raykhelson.

His recordings were released on such labels as Naxos, Albany, ASV Records and Toccata Classics. Earle's performance of Tchaikovsky's 5th symphony, recorded live in concert by Austrian broadcaster ORF in Vienna's Musikverein, was awarded Best Classical Album in California in 2002, and his live recording of Myroslav Skoryk's 75th birthday concerts was selected for the "Chairman's Choice 2014 – Klaus Heymann's Favorite Naxos Releases."

Numerous videos from his live concerts are on YouTube - ranging from highly-acclaimed performances of classics such as Verdi Requiem, Bruckner 4, Mahler 9, Debussy "La Mer", Beethoven "Eroica" and Strauss "Alpine Symphony" to music by Messaien, Penderecki, Weinberg, Silvestrov, Skoryk, Stankovych, Revueltas, Ginastera, Crimean composer Alemdar Karamanov, eminent Tajik composer Tolibkhon Shakhidi and the world premiere of the final composition by viennese composer Theodor Berger.

== Awards ==
In 2003, in conjunction with leading newspapers in Ukraine, the Russian Cosmonaut Association named a star in the Perseus (constellation) as "Hobart Earle".

Earle was named one of 30 "Professionals of the Year" by Musical America in 2014.
