= Choral Songs in honour of Her Majesty Queen Victoria =

1899 collection of choral songs

Choral Songs in honour of Her Majesty Queen Victoria is a collection of 13 choral songs by 13 British composers issued on the occasion of the 80th birthday of Queen Victoria in 1899.

In 1897–1898 the Master of the Queen's Music Sir Walter Parratt proposed a volume of choral songs modelled on The Triumphs of Oriana (1601) as part of the planned 80th birthday celebrations. He recruited 13 British composers, and in 1899 a limited edition of only 100 copies was produced entitled Choral Songs in honour of Her Majesty Queen Victoria.

The actual title on the front of the book is Choral Songs by Various Writers & Composers in Honour of Her Majesty Queen Victoria.

Contents

order	composer	poet	piece
1	Sir Alexander Campbell Mackenzie	Alfred Austin	With wisdom, goodness, grace
2	Sir Charles Villiers Stanford	A. C. Benson	Out in the windy West
3	Henry Walford Davies	Robert Bridges	Hark! The world is full of thy praise
4	Sir Frederick Bridge	Robert Crewe-Milnes, 1st Marquess of Crewe	For all the wonder of thy regal day
5	Sir George Martin	John Davidson (poet)	The seaboards are her mantle's hem
6	Sir Hubert Parry	Austin Dobson (1840–1921)	Who can dwell with greatness!
7	Arthur M. Goodhart	Edmund Gosse	Lady on the Silver Throne
8	Charles Wood	Arthur Coleridge James	A Century's Penultimate
9	Arthur Somervell	John Campbell, 9th Duke of Argyll	With still increasing blessings
10	Edward Elgar	Frederic W. H. Myers	To her beneath whose stedfast star
11	Charles Harford Lloyd	Henry Newbolt	A thousand years, by sea and land
12	Sir John Stainer	John Frederick Stainer (1866–1939)	Flora's Queen
13	Sir Walter Parratt	Sir Thomas Herbert Warren	The Triumph of Victoria

== Recordings ==
- Choral Songs in honour of Her Majesty Queen Victoria. Spiritus Chamber Choir dir. Aidan Oliver Toccata Classics 2008
