= Russian Conservatoria Chamber Capella =

The Russkaya Conservatoria Chamber Capella (Russian: Камерная капелла «Русская консерватория», The Russian Conservatoire) is a Russian vocal and instrumental ensemble, founded in 2008 by Russian born conductor Nikolay Khondzinsky. The group gives regular performances in Moscow, and attends music festivals in Russia and elsewhere.

The team have been seen as rediscoverers of forgotten masterpieces of Russian music of the 20th century, as well as of some European baroque music little known in Russia. They have also performed premieres of new music.

== Regular performances ==
The ensemble gives annual performances under the Terra Barocco project at Moscow concert halls (Moscow International House of Music, Moscow Conservatory, etc.)

== Festivals ==
The Russian Conservatoire has taken part in All-Russian and International festivals, such as:

- “Sviridov December Evenings” held annually at the composer’s birthplace (2009)
- 10th International Organ Festival of the Moscow Conservatory (2010)
- International Bach festival "From Christmas to Christmas" (2010, 2011)

== Premieres ==
The work of "Russkaya Conservatoriya" includes international and national premieres:

- Yuriy Abdokov – the world premiere of the ballet "Three Poems" (Moscow, 2014)
- Jan Dismas Zelenka – the world first performance of Gloria ZWV 30; the first Russian performance of Miserere ZWV 56; the first Russian performance of Miserere ZWV 57; the world first performance of Kyrie, Sanctus and Agnus Dei ZWV 26; the first Russian performance of almost all orchestral compositions;
- Georgy Sviridov – the first performance of the choruses from the cycle "A hard times song";
- Yuriy Abdokov – the first performance of orchestral music: ‘Autumn Prayers’, ‘On the Verge of Thawing and Ice’ and others;
- Johann Sebastian Bach – the first Russian performance of a number of sacred cantatas and instrumental works;
- Georg Philipp Telemann – the first Russian performance of cantatas "Du aber Daniel, gehe hin", "Sei getreu bis in den Tod"; etc.

== Current projects ==
Among current projects of Khondzinsky and the collective:

- The first Russian performance of all Bach's sacred cantatas;
- The first performance and recordings of compositions by G. Sviridov (the cycle "A hard times song", compositions for chorus accompanied by instrumental ensemble);
- The first performance and recordings of compositions by J.D. Zelenka (including ZWV 26; ZWV 30)
- The first performance and recordings of compositions by Y. Abdokov "Autumn Prayers", "On the Verge of Thawing and Ice", etc.;
- Terra barocco – first Russian performances of a number of compositions by Telemann, Heinichen, Bach’s family, Zelenka, Haendel, Biber and others.

== Critical comment ==
British reviewer W. Mark Roberts wrote in DSCH Journal that a recording made by the Russian Conservatoire directed by N. Khondzinsky "in the foreseeable future is unlikely to be surpassed for quality".

== Discography ==
- V.Y. Shebalin – the first complete recording of choral cycles (Toccata Classics, London – 2008/2011);
- B.A.Tchaikovsky – Andersen Fairy Tales, Naxos, London 2009 (choir)
- D.D. Shostakovich, the first recording of '’The Songs of a Guard's Division'’ (Toccata Classics, London – 2010/2011);
- G.V. Sviridov – the first recordings of works for choir, accompanied by an instrumental ensemble – the poem "Lapotny Mushik", etc. (in preparation);
- Y.B. Abdokov – the first recordings of orchestral works (in preparation).
