= Nikolay Khondzinsky =

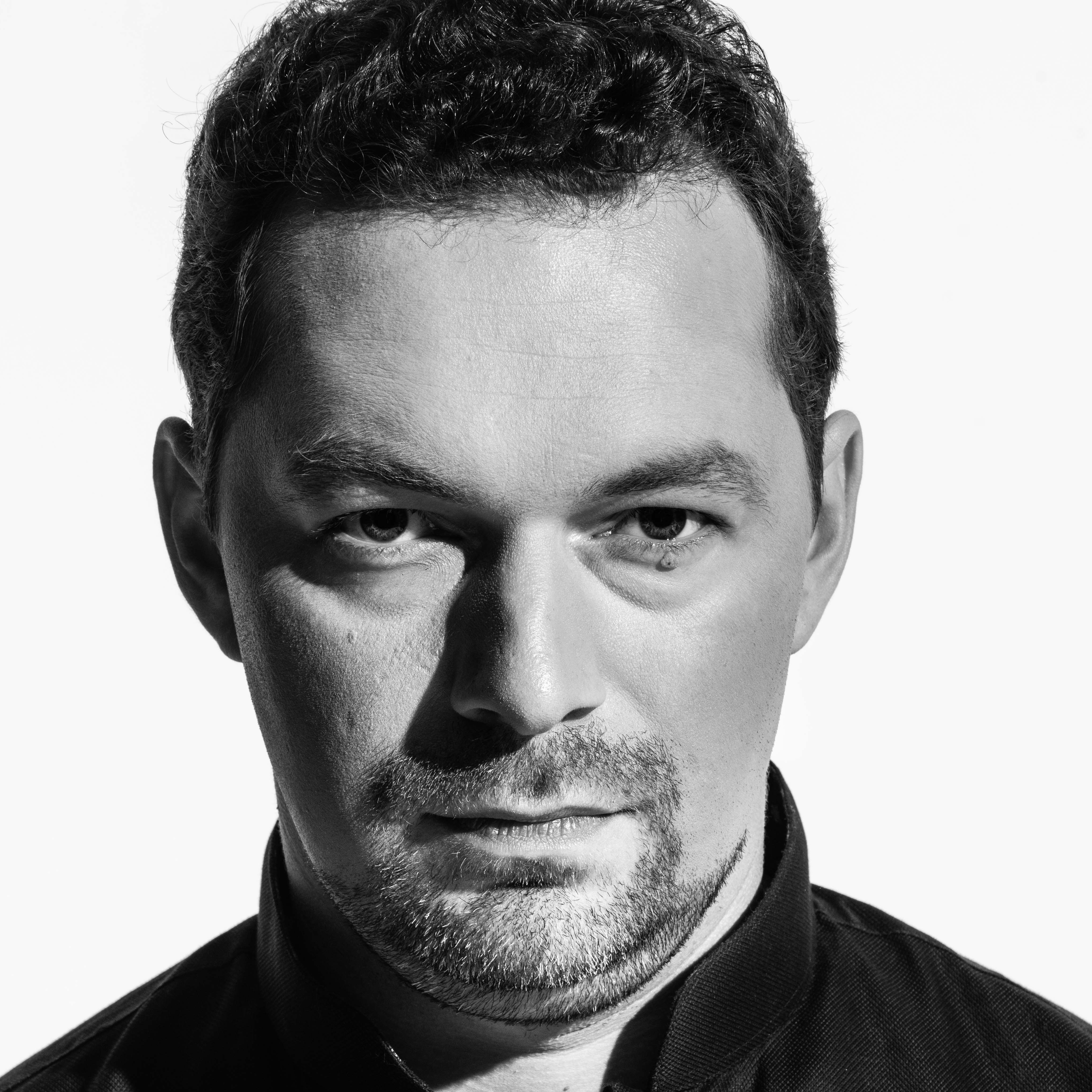
- Russian conductor Nikolay Khondzinsky
- Born: 23 May 1985 (age 41); Moscow, Russian Federation
- Occupation: Conductor

Nikolay Khondzinsky (Russian: Николай Павлович Хондзинский; born 23 May 1985) is a Russian conductor, founder and artistic director of the Russian Conservatoria Chamber Capella (The Russian Conservatoire), Artistic director and Chief conductor of the Pskov Region Symphony orchestra, Artistic director of the Council Hall (Moscow, Russia), Guest conductor of the Mariinsky Theatre

== Biography ==
Nikolay Khondzinsky was born in Moscow. In 2004, he graduated in choral conducting from Gnessin College and entered the Moscow State Conservatory, which he graduated from.

== Awards ==
- Scholarship holder of the Government of the Russian Federation
- Laureate of the Moscow State Award (2014), winner of the Grand Prix "Moscow Camerata" (2010)
- Laureate of the Boris Tсhaikovsky Award (2008)

== Career ==
Khondzinsky is the founder, artistic director and conductor of the Chamber cappella Russkaya conservatoria (The Russian Conservatoire), a team who have already managed to earn a reputation as rediscoverers of forgotten masterpieces of Russian music of the 20th century, as well as of some European music baroque memorials which are unknown in Russia. The most significant works of “Russkaya Conservatoriya” include international and national premieres:

- Yuriy Abdokov - the world premiere of the ballet Three Poems (Moscow, 2014)
- Jan Dismas Zelenka - the world first performance of Gloria ZWV 30; the first Russian performance of Miserere ZWV 56; the first Russian performance of Miserere ZWV 57; the world first performance of Kyrie, Sanctus and Agnus Dei ZWV 26; the first Russian performance of almost all orchestral compositions

The programs done by N. Khondzinsky and his team are performed annually in the best Russian concert halls (Concert Hall of the Mariinsky Theatre (St.Petersburg), Moscow International Art Center, Moscow Concervatory’s Halls, etc.), receiving ovations among the audience and getting appreciation among professionals. British reviewer W.Mark Roberts at DSCH Journal said a recording done by the Russian Conservatory headed by N. Khondzinsky «in the foreseeable future is unlikely to be surpassed for quality».

Founder and general director of the Autonomous non-profit organisation for support and development of the performing arts "The Russian Conservatory". President of the festival and the award MAGNUM OPUS, founder of the chamber music festival Ars in turri. Art director of a number of festivals in Moscow and Pskov (Russia).

Since being invited in 2014 by Valery Gergiev, Khondzinsky regularly collaborates as a guest conductor with the Mariinsky Theatre, Mariinsky Symphony Orchestra, Academy of Young Opera Singers of Mariinsky Theatre (leads by Larissa Gergieva). Among his performances: a concert, dedicated to the 100th Anniversary of Boris Tchaikovsky; a concert of tonali laureate Till Hofmann, which took place with the amicable support of Senate and Ministry of Culture of the Free and Hanseatic City of Hamburg; the world premiere of the D. Krivitsky’s opera «Doctor Zhivago»; concert programs included music by P. Tchaikovsky, S. Rachmaninov, I. Stravinsky, A. Khachaturian. L.v. Beethoven, W. A. Mozart and others. Among opera performances in the Mariinsky - Pagliacci (Leonkavallo); Die Fledermauß (Strauss); Der Zwerg (Zemlinsky); Rusalka (Dvorak).

Since 2018 he is the Artistic director and chief conductor of the Pskov Philharmonic Orchestra (Pskov, Russia). During the period Khondzinsky has founded a few festivals in the region. For several years Khondzinsky has been a head of the Symphonic and Chamber orchestras of the Moscow Music Haydn’s School.

As a guest conductor he has also collaborated with the Saint Petersburg Philharmonic Symphony Orchestra (after being invited by Yuriy Temirkanov in 2016), the Universal Ballet Company (Seoul, South Korea), Volgograd Academic Symphony Orchestra, Yaroslavl Academic Symphony Orchestra, Saratov Wind Orchestra, Volgograd State Opera and Ballet Theatre, the State Academic Symphony Orchestra of the Russian Federation, Ryazan Musical Theatre (Chief conductor 2011-2012), Yekaterinburg chamber choir "Domestik", Archangelsk State Chamber Orchestra, Nighniy-Novgorod Opera and Ballet Theatre, Ballet Theatre The Kremlin Ballet, Theatre the Russian Opera, Theatre "Balet- Moskva" and many others.

== Discography ==
- V.Y. Shebalin - the first complete recording of choral cycles (Toccata Classics, London - 2008/2011)
- B.A.Thaikovsky - Andersen Fairy Tales, Naxos, London 2009 (choir)
- D.D. Shostakovich, the first recording of ’’The Songs of a Guard's Division’’ (Toccata Classics, London - 2010/2011)
- G.V. Sviridov - the first recordings of works for choir, accompanied by an instrumental ensemble - the poem "Lapotny Mushik", (in preparation)
- Y.B. Abdokov - the first recordings of orchestral works (in preparation)
- M. Weinberg - Cantatas, first recording (in preparation)
