= Arthur Goodhart =

Arthur Goodhart may refer to:

- Arthur Murray Goodhart (1866–1941), British composer and organist
- Arthur Lehman Goodhart (1891–1978), American-born academic jurist and lawyer
