= Julius Bürger =

Julius Burger (Bürger) (11 March 1897 in Vienna – 12 June 1995 in New York City) was an Austrian then American composer, pianist and conductor.

He studied at the Vienna Academy of Music under Franz Schreker, and was one of the group of Schreker's pupils - Alois Hába, Jascha Horenstein, Ernst Křenek, Karol Rathaus - who followed Schreker to Berlin when Schreker was appointed Director of the Hochschule für Musik.

He had a long association with the Metropolitan Opera, New York first dating from his apprenticeship in 1924–1927, when Bruno Walter recommended him as assistant to Artur Bodanzky. He was an assistant to Otto Klemperer at the Kroll Opera, then following the Nazi ban on Jewish artists in 1933, drifted between Vienna, Brussels and Paris as well as visits to London to work for the BBC as an orchestrater. In February 1938 Bürger and his wife exited a train to Vienna in Paris, and in 1939 they departed permanently for America. His mother and four of his brothers were sent to Auschwitz, his mother being shot by the roadside and the brothers murdered in the camp.

== Works, editions and recordings ==
- Stille der Nacht, for baritone and orchestra. Scherzo for Strings. Cello Concerto. Variations on a Theme of Carl Philipp Emanuel Bach. Legende, for baritone and orchestra. Berlin Radio Symphony Orchestra, conducted by Simone Young, Toccata Classics (2006)
- A Journey in Exile : The Lieder of Julius Burger. First recordings of lieder composed from 1915-1988. Performed by Ryan Hugh Ross - Baritone, Siân Màiri Cameron - Mezzo Soprano, Nicola Rose - Pianist, Dr. Daniel Rieppel - Pianist. Spätlese Musik Records (2019). https://www.rediscoveredbeauty.org/burgerlieder-album
