= German Galynin =

Soviet composer (1922–1966)

German Germanovich Galynin (Russian: Ге́рман Германо́вич Галы́нин; 30 March 1922, in Tula, Russia – 18 June 1966, in Moscow) was a Russian composer, student, and continuer of the Shostakovich and Myaskovsky line in Soviet classic music.

== Life and career ==
Raised in an orphanage ["children's home"], he taught himself to play several folk instruments and the piano. In 1941, after Operation Barbarossa began and when he was already a student at Moscow Conservatory, he joined the army as a volunteer, there directing various grass-roots performances, and writing songs and music to dramas. In 1943–50 (1945–50, according to other sources) he resumed his studies at the Moscow Conservatory under Dmitri Shostakovich and Nikolay Myaskovsky (in composition) and Igor Sposobin (in music theory). Inasmuch as in 1948 Shostakovich was accused of "formalism" in music, the same tendencies were detected in the works of his pupils, particularly Galynin. Tikhon Khrennikov criticized Galynin's First Piano Concerto in particular, although later (in 1957) he denied such an assessment. Nevertheless, the composer was awarded the Stalin Prize in 1951 for his "Epic Poem" (1950).

Despite falling seriously ill with schizophrenia in 1951 and in consequence spending a considerable part of his life in hospitals and psychiatric clinics, Galynin remained an active composer. His work is a bright phenomenon in Soviet classical music though still underestimated, unfortunately, in his homeland and largely overlooked in the West. Within the well-developed system of public Children's Music Schools in Russia and the former Soviet republics Galynin is most gratefully remembered for his short and easy pieces of music composed for beginners, some of them being variations of popular folk melodies. "The composer’s bright and original talent was a union of melodic generosity, picturesque harmonies, a sense of modern colouring, and elegance of classical form", the Encyclopedia of Music (Moscow, 1973) wrote of him.

Galynin died in Moscow in 1966.

== Selected works ==
- 1939–41 Sonata Triad for piano (revised 1963)
- 1939 Spanish Fantasy for piano
- 1945 Suite for piano
- 1946 First Concerto for Piano and Orchestra
- 1947 String Quartet No 1
- 1949 Piano Trio
- 1949 Suite for String Orchestra
- 1950 Epic Poem (Russian: Эпическая поэма for Symphonic Orchestra (The State Stalin Prize), 1951)
- 1950 Death and the Maiden, (Девушка и смерть, Oratorium (inspired by Maxim Gorky’s poem)
- 1951 Youth Festive Ouverture (Молодёжная праздничная увертюра) for Symphonic Orchestra
- 1956 String Quartet No. 2
- 1959 Aria for Violin and String Orchestra
- 1959 Four Preludes for piano
- 1965 Second Concerto for Piano and Orchestra
- 1966 Scherzo for Violin and String Orchestra

== Selected recordings ==
- Piano Music, Volume 1; Sonata Triad, Suite, Four Preludes, Waltz, Dance, Scherzo, Spanish Fantasy, Three Pieces from The Tamer Tamed, At the Zoo. Olga Solovieva Toccata Classics
- Legends of the XX Century; Piano Concerto No. 1 (soloist Dmitri Bashkirov); Sonata Triad (Anatoli Vedernikov); Piano Trio in D minor; Aria for Violin and Strings. Melodiya CD1001808 (2011)
- Complete Works for Strings; Scherzo for Violin and Strings, Aria for Violin and Strings, Suite for Strings, String Quartets No. 1 and 2; Toccata Classics (2020)

== Bibliography ==
- (in Russian) Мнацаканова Е. Герман Галынин. – Москва, 1965.
- (in Russian) И.П.Кулясов. Галынин, Герман Германович // Музыкальная энциклопедия. – Т.1. – Москва: Сов. Энциклопедия, 1973. – С.891.
