= Pēteris Plakidis =

Latvian composer and pianist (1947–2017)

- Born: 4 March 1947; Riga, Latvia
- Died: 8 August 2017 (aged 70)
- Genre: Classical
- Occupations: Composer, pianist
- Instrument: Piano

Pēteris Plakidis (4 March 1947 – 8 August 2017) was a Latvian composer and pianist.

== Early life ==
Plakidis was born on 4 March 1947 in Riga, Latvia. He was educated at the Emīls Dārziņš College of Music before studying as an undergraduate in the Composition Department at the Jāzeps Vītols State Conservatory (now the Latvian Academy of Music). He graduated in 1970, having been taught by composers Jānis Ivanovs and Valentīns Utkins. Plakidis undertook further postgraduate study at the conservatory, which he completed in 1975.

== Career ==
From 1969 to 1974, before he had graduated, Plakidis held the post of musical director for the Latvian National Theatre. From 1975, he was a tutor in the composition department at the Latvian Academy of Music, and in 1991 he became professor of composition. Plakidis has received much recognition as a composer. In 1969 he received a diploma at the All-Union Young Composers' Competition, for his composition "Music for Piano, String Orchestra and Timpani" and in 1982 was awarded the title of Honoured Artist. He was the recipient of the Jānis Ivanovs Prize in 1987 and in 1990 he was awarded the title of "People's Artist". In 1996, Plakidis won the Latvian Grand Music Award for "Variations for Orchestra".

== Music ==
Plakidis's music is often part of the Latvian National Symphony Orchestra's repertoire, and he was commissioned to write orchestral works for their 60th, 65th and 70th anniversaries. His works have also been performed by the New York University Chamber Music Society who performed "Pastorale". The New York Times described the piano part as "couched in brash, clustered harmonies" and the piece as "fascinating". "Distant Song" has featured as a piano piece for ABRSM exams.

On 26 July 2007, at the Lithuanian embassy in London, record label Toccata Classics released an album of the composer's works entitled "Peteris Plakidis: Music for String Orchestra" on which the composer was pianist. Reviews include a description of "Music for Piano, String Orchestra and Timpani" as a "Bartók inspired (...) vehicle for nationalist and separatist feeling".

== Personal life ==
Plakidis was married to opera and concert singer Maija Krīgena. He died on 8 August 2017.

== Selected works ==
Orchestral

- Music for Piano, String Orchestra and Timpani (1969)
- Atskatīšanās (Glance Back) for orchestra (1991)
- Dziedājums (Canto) for orchestra (1986)
- Dziedoša prelūdija un dancojoša fūga (Singing Prelude and Dancing Fugue) for orchestra (1994)
- Legend for orchestra (1976)
- Variations for Orchestra (1996)

Concertante

- Sasaukšanās (Interplay), Concerto for piccolo, flute, oboe, bass clarinet, horn and orchestra (1977)
- Concerto for Two Oboes and String Orchestra (1982)
- Koncerts balāde (Concerto Ballade) for two violins, piano and string orchestra (1984)
- Concerto da camera for string orchestra, two off-stage violins and piano (1992)
- Intrada for clarinet and orchestra (1992)
- Vēl viena Vēbera opera (One More Weber Opera) for clarinet and orchestra (1993)
- Brīvdabas mūzika (Open-Air Music) for violin and orchestra (2003)
- Pasticcio à la Rossini for cello and string orchestra (2006)

Chamber music

- Prelūdija un pulsācija (Prelude and Pulsation) for wind quintet (1975)
- Divas variācijas (Two Variations) for cello solo (1976)
- Detektīva epizode (Episode from a Crime Story) for violin, bassoon, cello and piano (1977)
- Divas skices (Two Sketches) for oboe solo (1977)
- Divas sienāža dejas (Two Grasshopper Dances), 2 children's pieces for violin (1978)
- Mazs koncerts (Little Concerto) for 2 violins (1991)
- Nakts sarunas (Night Conversations) for clarinet and piano (1992)
- Bezmiegs (Sleeplessness) for clarinet, cello and piano (1997)
- Ēnu dejas (Dances of the Shadows) for viola and piano (2007)

Vocal

- Div' buramdziesmas (Two Magical Songs) for mixed choir (1980)
- Fatamorgana for mixed choir (1980)
- Nolemtība (Destiny), choral symphony for mixed choir (1985)
- In Memoriam for mixed choir (1990); words by Broņislava Martuževa
- Dziesmas vējam un asinīm (Songs for the Wind and Blood) for mezzo-soprano and string orchestra (1991)
- Mūžība (Eternity) for mixed choir (1998); words by Jānis Jaunsudrabiņš
