= Der schlimm-heilige Vitalis (opera) =

1962 comic opera by Richard Flury

Der schlimm-heilige Vitalis (The Evil-holy Vitalis) is a 1962 comic opera by Richard Flury. It is based on the fifth of the Seven Legends novella cycle by Gottfried Keller published 1872.

A woman falls in love with a monk, Vitalis, and persuades him to leave the order and marry her.
