= Vladislav Davidzon =

American journalist (born 1987)

Vladislav Grigorievich Davidzon
- Владислав Григорьевич Давидзон
- Born: 7 March 1985 (age 41); Tashkent, Uzbek Soviet Socialist Republic, Soviet Union
- Education: City University of New York, EIUC
- Occupations: Writer, Editor
- Spouse: Regina Maryanovska-Davidzon (2013–2024)
- Writing career
- Language: English, Russian, Ukrainian

Vladislav Grigorievich Davidzon (born 7 March 1985) is an artist, writer, and film producer best known for his journalism and chronicling on post-Soviet politics with an emphasis on cultural affairs. Davidzon is the former publisher and editor-in-chief of The Odessa Review, an anglophone publication that focused on the cultural life of Odesa, Ukraine. Davidzon is a nonresident fellow with the Atlantic Council at the Eurasia Center and is the author of From Odessa with Love, a novel about modern Odesa. He is known for his daily practice of keeping an artistic daybook/diary and also for his work as a collage artist.

In March 2022 he burned his Russian passport in front of the Russian embassy in Paris with former Estonian President Toomas Hendrik Ilves holding the lighter.

== Early life and education ==
Davidzon was born in Tashkent, then capital of the Uzbek Soviet Socialist Republic, on March 7, 1985, to a family of Jewish origin. His grandfather was active in the republic's liberalizing political arena and was assassinated. Davidzon moved with his family to Moscow before emigrating to New York City in 1991. His father, Grigory Davidzon, became a "kingmaker" and entrepreneur in the Russophone community of Brighton Beach.

Vladislav Davidzon attended Abraham Lincoln High School in Brooklyn; he went on to study English literature at City University of New York. During that time, he was an aide to renowned violinist Nina Beilina. At CUNY was a student of political theorist Marshall Barman as well as Literary Critic Morris Dickstein and poet Matvei Yankelevich.

== Author ==
In 2011, Davidzon moved to Odesa, Ukraine, where he wrote dispatches on topics relating to the social and cultural landscape of the city. After the Maidan Revolution, Davidzon founded The Odessa Review, which served as an anglophone platform for this subject. Davidzon's experience in interacting with various local and national politicians and intellectuals were compiled into a collection of essays in his book, From Odessa With Love.

== Journalist ==
Davidzon has resided in Paris since leaving Odesa, serving as the correspondent for Tablet Magazine. He writes as a freelancer on issues that concern European politics and cultural affairs and their intersection with Jewish culture.

In 2020, Davidzon was approached by Ukrainian operatives connected to the campaign of President Donald Trump, with offers by Russian agent Andri Telezhenko to propagate news relating to the Hunter Biden laptop controversy. According to CNN "Davidzon said he did not act on the offer, letting it go “as elegantly as possible.” But he shared what he knew with US authorities. Telezhenko was sanctioned by the United States Treasury as a Russian agent in 2021 based on partly on this information. The experience left him critical of Ukrainian involvement in American elections. In 2023, his second book received a foreword from Bernard Henri-Levy. Levy has written about Ukrainian-Jewish affairs and has mentioned Davidzon in those writings .

Currently, Davidzon is reporting from Ukraine on the 2022 Russian invasion of Ukraine on behalf of Tablet Magazine and Foreign Policy Magazine. On the night before the Russian invasion began on 24 February 2022, Davidzon had dinner in Kyiv with his friend, investor Dan Rapoport, who would die several months later in Washington D.C. under suspicious circumstances.

Davidzon worked as a producer on actor Sean Penn's Ukraine war documentary "Superpower" and traveled with Penn producing the film and interpreting during some of Penn`s meetings with Ukrainian officials. Davidzon is a member of the Dutch anarcho-art collective The Unsafe House.

== Personal life ==
During his studies in Paris with his wife, Franco-Ukrainian film producer met Regina Maryanovska-Davidzon. The couple separated in 2024.

Davidzon is a descendant of the Soviet Composer Isaac Dunaevsky. He teaches Eastern European politics and art history at the New School and Parsons Paris.

Davidzon is a self-identified Judeo-Banderite.

== Awards ==
- Davidzon is a recipient of the Washington DC based Transatlantic Leadership Network 2022 "Freedom of the Media" award for the Best Next Generation Journalism Reporting.
