= Vladas Jakubėnas =

Lithuanian composer, pianist, musicologist and journalist

Vladas Jonas Jakubėnas (Biržai, May 15, 1904 – Chicago, December 13, 1976) was a Lithuanian composer, pianist, musicologist and journalist.

== Works, editions and recordings ==
- Chamber Music: Kasparas Uinskas, Rusne Mataityte, Edmundas Kulikauskas, Albina Siksniute, Vilnius String Quartet, St Christopher Chamber Orchestra, Donatas Katkus Toccata Classics 2011
