= Steve Elcock =

Anglo-French composer

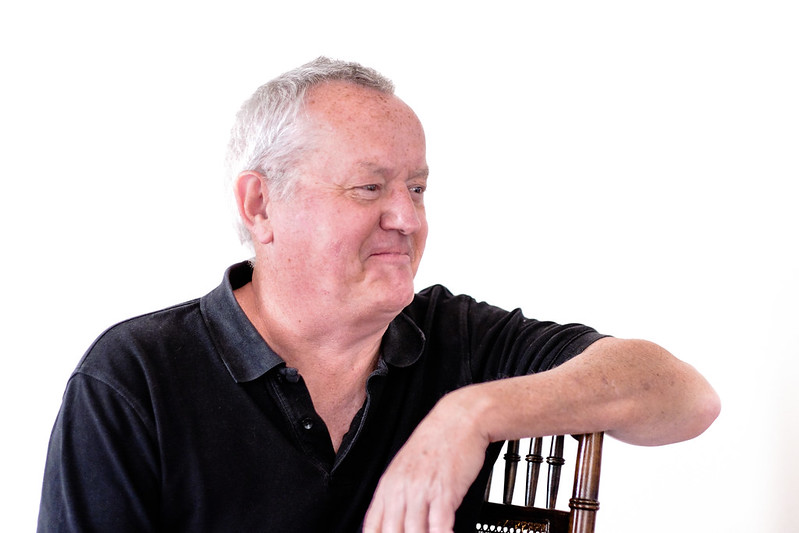
Steve Elcock

Steve Elcock (born 1957) is an Anglo-French composer residing in France, whose style has been placed by critics in the context of composers such as Sibelius, Honegger, Walton and Arnold. Elcock himself states that he was particularly inspired by the music of Swedish composer Allan Pettersson. Elcock is self-taught as a composer. In recent years, his works, which include ten symphonies and a variety of orchestral and chamber pieces, have begun to be performed publicly; a number of them have now been recorded.

== Life ==
Elcock was born in Chesterfield, Derbyshire, in 1957. He began to compose at the age of 15, and although he received violin lessons at school, he is self-taught as a composer. He gained a place to study music at Oxford University in 1975 but left after only a few weeks and instead began training as a teacher of French. During this time he met his future wife, Annick. In 1981, he moved with Annick to France where he worked in language services. Some of his early compositions were played by the local amateur symphony orchestra which he conducted there.

In 2009 his orchestral piece Hammering (op. 15) was performed by the BBC Philharmonic Orchestra with the conductor James MacMillan at a studio concert in Manchester, which was later broadcast. This was the first occasion when a work of Elcock was performed by a professional ensemble. In 2013, Elcock forwarded copies of his scores of his Symphonies 3 and 4 and his symphonic poem Wreck to Martin Anderson, head of the Toccata Classics record company, who expressed his enthusiasm and made it known to others in the world of music. As a consequence Elcock's first string quartet The Girl from Marseille was performed at the 2014 'Indian Summer in Levoča' festival in Levoča, Slovakia, and his second quartet The Cage of Opprobrium, dedicated to the town, was premiered there in 2015.

In 2017 Toccata began to issue recordings of Elcock's works, beginning with a disc of orchestral works including his Symphony no. 3. In the same year, the BBC Philharmonic Orchestra broadcast his Choses renversées par le temps ou la destruction. Elcock's Symphony no. 8 was premiered at the 2021 Three Choirs Festival and later recorded by Nimbus Records, together with his Violin Concerto. In 2024 his Piano Quintet op. 34 was premiered at the Elgar Festival, Worcester, as was his Concerto Grosso op. 12.

Elcock is presently Composer in Residence for the English Symphony Orchestra.

== Music ==
Andrew Mellor, reviewing the first recording of Elcock's music in The Gramophone, wrote "It is humbling that a self-taught European composer in his sixties can have written such a stack of well-crafted, emotionally honest and non-derivative music without anybody really noticing and with hardly a note being performed professionally." He went on to say that, although there had been suggestions that Elcock's compositions had touches of the music of Jean Sibelius, Carl Nielsen and Robert Simpson, he himself also noted parallels with the music of Arthur Honegger and William Walton. The critic Jean Lacroix has likewise identified comparisons with Peter Mennin and Viktor Kalabis. Francis Pott adds for context of Elcock's music that of Malcolm Arnold and Vagn Holmboe. Pott also mentions the Swedish composer Allan Pettersson, about whom Elcock is "passionately enthusiastic ... it was the discovery of Pettersson's music in 1980 that impelled Elcock to start composing in earnest."

Amongst the characteristics of Elcock's music is the use of unusual scales or modes. His one-movement Fourth Symphony has been described by the composer as "a recycling plant for dodecaphonic waste." Other pieces use the octatonic scale to avoid simple tonality. Paul Mann highlights Elcock's "compositional integrity, meticulous craftsmanship and inexorable symphonic logic."

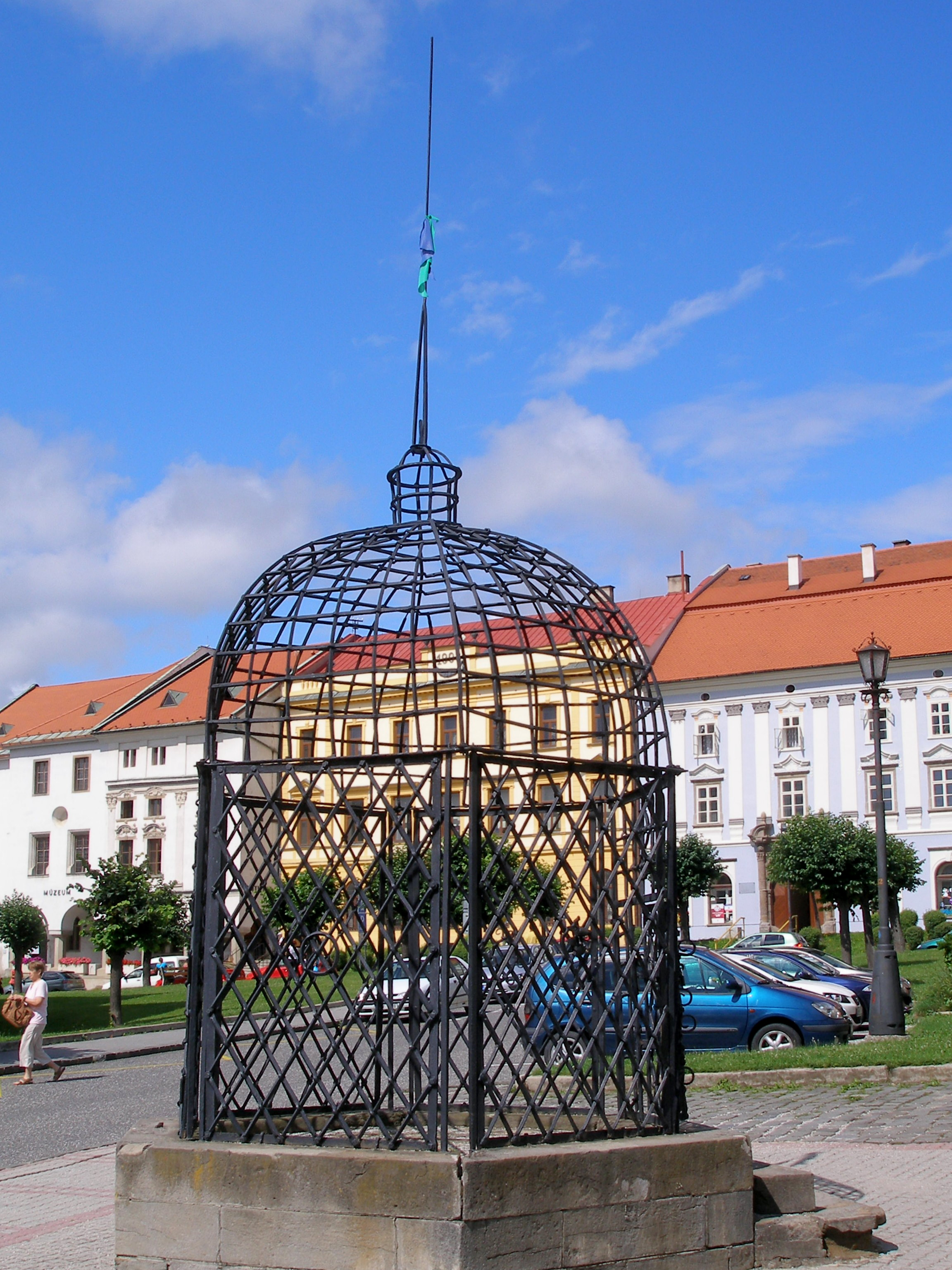
The "Cage of Shame" in Levoča, Slovakia, which inspired Elcock's string quartet, The Cage of Opprobrium, op. 22

Elcock's earliest acknowledged works are for the French amateur orchestra he conducted, and include works, such as his Suite bien temperée (op. 1) and Haven (op. 4), inspired by Johann Sebastian Bach. Some of his later works are adaptations of earlier compositions; for example his First Symphony op. 6b (2001, rev. 2015) was based on a Concerto for clarinet and bassoon op. 6a written in 1995–96. (Bach is also invoked in the later orchestral work Choses Renversées par le Temps ou la Destruction, op. 22 (2013), where a Bach prelude on the harpsichord is interrupted and ousted by the orchestra).

Elcock has given titles and subtitles to a number of his works but the meaning of these is not always transparent. Of the subtitle to his Fourth Symphony (2013: rev. 2017) "A golden rose fallen from the flat sea of time", he has said "you must make of it what you can," although he has commented of his string quartets that "I find so many quartets to be dry and unapproachable. Giving them titles hopefully gives the listener something to hang on to." Of An Outstretched Hand, which was partly written as a response to the 2015 European migrant crisis, the composer has written: "Gerald Finzi once compared composing to shaking hands "with a good friend over the centuries". It was perhaps this that first brought the idea of the outstretched hand into my mind, and no sooner had it lodged there than I became aware of the ambiguity of the image: is this hand appealing for help, or is it extended to offer help? [...] The tensions between these two interpretations – cry for help and solace – were sufficient to generate this 19 minute piece for six instruments". The reviewer in The Gramophone found "the music cunningly embodying [this] notion in the development of its musical material". Elcock's Symphony no. 6 (2017–18) carries the subtitle "Tyrants Destroyed" and a dedication to "the everlasting execration of self-serving politicians, the obscenely rich and the system that allows them to remain so."

== Works ==
Elcock's works are listed at his website, where most of them are accompanied by performance recordings or computer realizations, as well as comments by the composer.

=== Symphonies ===
- Symphony No. 1, op. 6b
- Symphony No. 2, op. 14
- Symphony No. 3, op. 16
- Symphony No. 4, op. 19
- Symphony No. 5, op. 21
- Symphony No. 6, op. 30
- Symphony no. 7, op. 33
- Symphony no. 8, op. 37
- Symphony no. 9, op. 39
- Symphony no. 10, op. 40
- Symphony no. 11, op. 43

=== Other orchestral works ===
- Une Suite bien Tempérée, op. 1
- Elegy for oboe, timpani and strings, op. 2
- Serenade for flute and strings, op. 3
- Haven, op. 4
- Wedding day, op. 5
- Double concerto for clarinet and bassoon, op. 6a
- Festive Overture, op. 7
- Wreck, op. 10
- Concertino for clarinet and strings, op.11a
- Concerto Grosso, op. 12
- Violin Concerto, op. 13
- Hammering, op. 15
- Choses renversées par le temps ou la destruction, op. 20
- Manic Dancing, op. 25
- Incubus, op. 28
- Viola concerto, op.29
- Fermeture, op. 38

=== Chamber works ===
- String Trio no. 1, op. 8a and b
- Sextet for clarinet and strings, op. 11b.
- The girl from Marseille (string quartet), op. 17
- The Cage of Opprobrium (string quartet) op. 22
- Song for Yodit, op. 23
- An Outstretched Hand, op. 24
- The shed dances, op. 26
- Night after Night (string quartet) op. 27
- String Trio no 2, op. 31
- Piano Quintet, op. 34
- Conversation pieces / Sonatina for viola and piano, op. 35
- The Aftermath of Longing (string quartet), op. 36
- Rain, op. 41
- Variations sur un thème de Francis Popy (string quartet), op. 42

=== Vocal music ===
- Spei Cantus, op. 9
- Three motets for Christmas, op. 18
- Os justi for female choir, op. 32
