= Richard Flury =

Swiss composer and conductor (1896–1967)

Richard Flury (26 March 1896 in Biberist – 23 December 1967) was a Swiss composer and conductor. Flury was the son of a restaurateur and accomplished amateur trumpeter. His composition teachers were Hans Huber in Switzerland and Joseph Marx in Vienna. After studying abroad he returned to Switzerland, took a conducting course with Felix Weingartner in Basel, and then became a music teacher at his old school, the Solothurn Canton School, where he stayed for over 30 years, until 1961. He conducted the Solothurn City Orchestra from 1919 until 1949, also conducting various other local orchestras and choirs, playing in dance bands and teaching violin.

Although essentially a localised community musician in German-speaking Switzerland, Flury was also a prolific composer in multiple genres, starting around 1911 and continuing until his death. His style generally remained within the neo-Romantic tradition. There are four operas, four violin concertos, five symphonies, seven string quartets, eight masses, 11 violin sonatas and around 180 songs. He wrote an autobiography, Lebenserinnerungen (1950), which includes worklists.

Flury married Lily Sollberger in 1924 and there were four children. They divorced and he married again in 1939, this time to a former violin pupil, Rita Gostele. At this time he helped Jewish musicians (such as Gottfried Kassowitz, a pupil of Schoenberg and Berg) secure musical positions in neutral Switzerland. There is a bust of Flury by the Viennese sculptor Richard Kauffungen, completed in 1942. He died of stomach cancer in December 1967, aged 71.

Toccata Classics has issued twelve CDs of his music, including the four operas, orchestral music, chamber music, ballet and songs. His son, the musician and composer Urs Joseph Flury (born 1941) established the Richard Flury Foundation in 1996 to mark his father's centenary.

== Selected works ==
Symphonic and Concertante

- Symphony No. 1 in D minor (1922–23)
- Piano Concerto No.1 (1927)
- Fastnachts Symphonie (1928)
- Violin Concerto No. 1 (1933)
- Symphony No. 2 Tessiner (1936)
- Violin Concerto No. 2 (1940)
- Waldsymphonie (1942)
- Piano Concerto No.2 (1943)
- Violin Concerto No 3 (1943–44)
- Symphony No 3. Bucheggbergische (1946)
- Symphony No. 4 Liechtensteinische (1951)
- Symphony No. 5 (1955–6)
- Suite for String Orchestra (1959)
- Violin Concerto No. 4 (1966)
- Four Caprices for Violin and Orchestra (1966–67)

Chamber

- String Quartet No. 1 (1926)
- String Quartet No. 2 (1929)
- String Trio (1935)
- String Quartet No. 3 (1938)
- String Quartet No. 4 (1940)
- Piano Trio (1941)
- Piano Quintet (1948)
- Trio for clarinet, cello and piano (1950)
- String Trio (1951)
- Quartett für vier Waldhörner (1954)
- String Quartet No. 5 (1955)
- String Quartet No. 6 in D minor (1958)
- String Quartet No. 7 in D minor (1964)

Instrumental

- Violin Sonatas Nos. 1, 2 and 3 (1918)
- Piano Sonata (1920)
- Oboe Sonata (1926)
- Violin Sonata No. 4 (1936)
- Cello Sonata No. 1 (1937)
- Violin Sonata No. 5 (1940)
- Cello Sonata No. 2 (1941)
- Violin Sonata No. 6 (1943)
- Violin Sonata No. 7 (1948)
- Fifty Romantic Pieces for solo piano (1949)
- Violin Sonata No. 8 (1950)
- Violin Sonata No. 9 (1951)
- 24 Preludes for piano (1952)
- Violin Sonata No. 10 (1960)
- Violin Sonata No. 11 (1961)
- Cello Sonata No. 3 (1966)

Vocal and choral

- 8 Liebeslieder (1920–22)
- Mass in D minor (1931)
- Nachtlieder, 10 songs (1936)
- Te Deum for soloists, chorus and orchestra (1939)
- 29 Lieder (1946)
- Der Schleier der Mutter, cantata for soloists, chorus and orchestra (1957)
- 6 Lieder für Sopran und Streichquartett (1959)
- 17 Lieder (1951–52)

Opera and ballet

- Kleine Ballettmusik (1925–26)
- Eine florentinische Tragödie, opera (1928)
- Die helle Nacht opera (1932–5)
- Casanova e l’Albertolli, opera, 1937
- Die alte Truhe, ballet (1945)
- Der magische Spiegel, ballet in three scenes (1954)
- Der schlimm-heilige Vitalis (opera), comic opera (1962)
