= Reinhard Oppel =

German composer

Julius Reinhard Oppel (1878 in Grünberg, Hesse – 1941 in Leipzig) was a German composer.

He studied at the Hoch Conservatory in Frankfurt 1903–1909, was briefly an organist in Bonn, then from 1911 professor of composition at the Kiel Conservatory of Music, and from 1928 professor of music theory at the Leipzig Conservatory.

Oppel was a student, correspondent, and friend of Heinrich Schenker, the famous Viennese Jewish music theorist, and made efforts to disseminate Schenkerian theory while a professor at Leipzig.

Oppel was an outspoken critic of the Nazis. Until 1938, Oppel often played the organ not only in Protestant and Catholic churches, but also in synagogues in Leipzig.

== Works ==
For a complete list of works, see the University of Hamburg link given below.

- Piano pieces: 5 Stücke op. 21, Suite op. 26 and 4 Preludes op. 27.
- String Quartet No.4 in F minor Op.33 (published 1928 by Edition Peters) (nos.2 and 3 are in manuscript at the Oppel Memorial Collection.)
- Sonata in D minor for Solo Violin, op. 12 (self-published 1910).
- Suite in E minor for Solo Violin, op. 19 (self-published 1913).
- Books and articles on Johann Sebastian Bach, Piotr Ilyich Tchaikovsky (mostly or wholly articles published in journals and collections) and others
  - (e.g.) "Tschaikowsky als Liederkomponist."
  - Jacob Meiland (1542-1577). Ein Beitrag zur Musikgeschichte des Ansbacher Hofes, Diss[ertation]. München, 1911, Pfungstadt, 1911.
  - Über Orgelstücke und Orgelspiel (Part 1: Betrachtungen und Ratschläge über Studium und Vortrag von Tonwerken für Orgel (mit Notenbeispielen)) (no Part 2?) (Hecht, 1898)

Only a small number of the opp. no. from 1-33 seem to have been used for published works (another included a set Op.6- Liturgy Op.6 no.3 and other works), the others reserved for works that remained in manuscript at least during his lifetime, e.g. his string trio in C minor op.10. Other works in manuscript received no opus number at all (e.g. the second and third string quartets and the two string quintets. However, the first string quartet, though in manuscript, was given op. 18, in E♭ major.)

== Recordings ==
The Korean pianist Heejung Kang has revived music by Schenker and his students Reinhard Oppel, Paul Kletzki and Arnold Mendelssohn, in concert and on record:

- Rediscovered Lieder and Piano Pieces by Kletzki, Oppel, and Schenker, College of Music at UNT. 2002
- Piano Music Vol.1. Heejung Kang. Toccata Classics 2011

A Japanese String Quartet Starhill Quartet recorded Quartet No.4 F minor op.33 in 2018. The detail can be found in the webpage (Japanese only). https://auroraakeru2000.wixsite.com/oppel
