= The Odessa Review =

Ukrainian cultural magazine

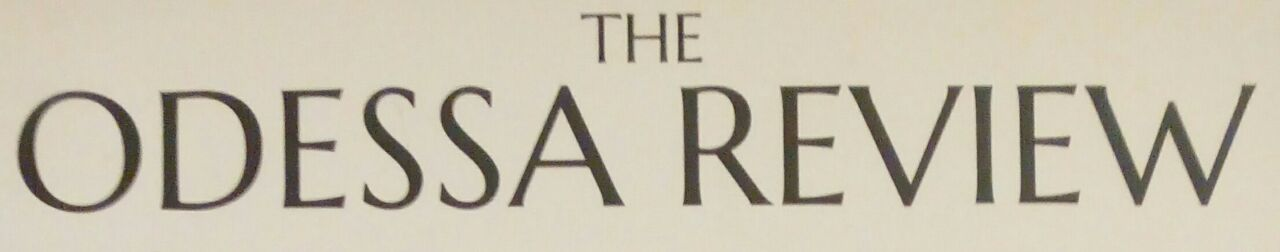

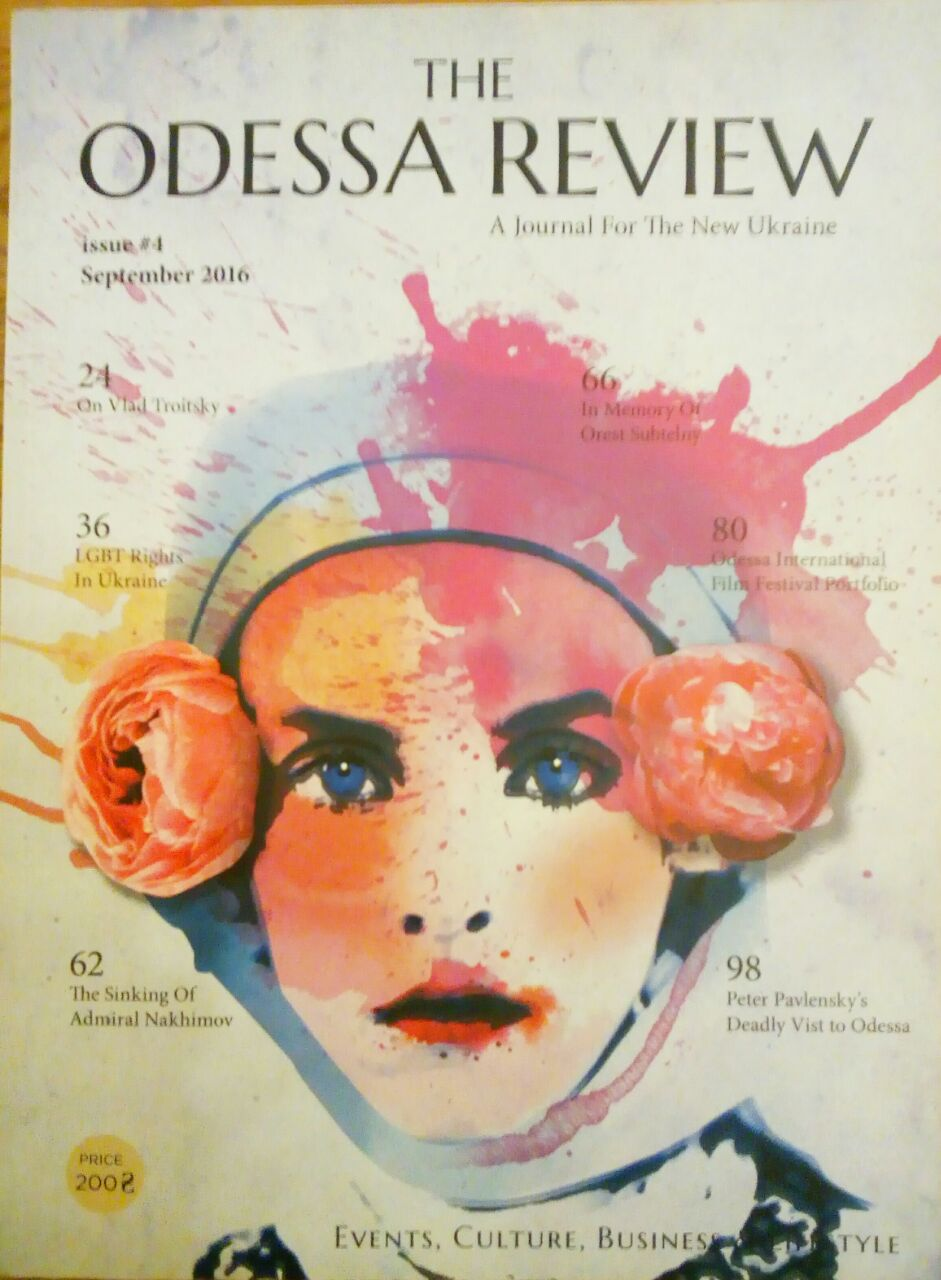
- Editor: Vladislav Davidzon
- Categories: Politics, business, culture, lifestyle
- First issue: April, 2016; 5 months ago
- Final issue: 2019
- Country: Ukraine
- Based in: Odesa
- Language: English
- Website: odessareview.com

The Odessa Review was a print English language cultural magazine founded and named after the Ukrainian city of Odesa that existed between 2016 and 2019. Based for most of its history in Odesa, the magazine's office moved to Kyiv in 2018. Magazine's primary focus was on topics related to the literary and intellectual life of Odesa and Ukraine in general.

Between 2016 and 2019 the magazine published thirteen issues in print form and online (Quarterly issues as well as a pair of special issues).

== History ==
The Odessa Review was launched in 2016. The first issue of the magazine included an extended interview with Odessa-based conductor Hobart Earle. In August 2017 the magazine took part in the “Odessa Reads. Odessa Is Read” Isaac Babel themed literary flashmob in the summer of 2017. In October 2017, the magazine put out a special issue related to Jewish-Ukrainian relations.

The Odessa Review was closed in 2019.

== Contributors ==
Noteworthy contributors included, among others, Ukrainian blogger Nick Holmov, Ukrainian art critic Ute Kilter, Russian poet Borys Khersonskyi, British journalist Peter Pomerantsev, American art critic Barry Schwabsky, and American historian Timothy Snyder.

== Editor-in-chief ==
The founder and editor-in-chief of The Odessa Review until 2018 was Vladislav Davidzon, a Paris-based journalist for the Tablet magazine of Uzbek-Jewish and Russian origin. Davidzon is the son of Russian-American Gregory Davidzon, a kingmaker of the Russian-majority community of Brighton Beach, New York and owner of the largest Russian-language radio station in the United States. After the close of The Odessa Review Davidzon has been working as a Paris-based and non-resident fellow at the Atlantic Council.
