= Die helle Nacht =

German language Opera

Die helle Nacht (The Bright Night) is a 1935 opera by Richard Flury to Paul Zifferer's 1912 verse play of the same name.

== Recording ==
- Die helle Nacht – Julia Sophie Wagner, Stephanie Bühlmann, Magnus Vigilius, Eric Stoklosa, Göttinger Symphonie Orchester, Paul Mann. CD Toccata 2021
