= Arthur Murray Goodhart =

British composer and organist

Arthur Murray Goodhart (christened 25 July 1866 – 1941) was a British composer and organist.

Goodhart was born in Wimbledon, Surrey, England in 1866 to Eleanor and Charles Woide Goodhart. He was educated at Eton College and then King's College, Cambridge, where he was a member of the Pitt Club. He was a pupil of Sir Joseph Barnby and Frederick Bridge, then a housemaster at Eton College (Walpole). He later lived in Brighton and he contributed to The Triumphs of Oriana (1899).

Precentor of Eton College, 1875–1892, then principal of Guildhall School of Music, London. Conductor of the Concerts of the Royal Academy of Music, 1886–1888.

Following the death of C. H. Lloyd in 1919 (his predecessor as Precentor at Eton), Goodhart helped edit his Free Accompaniment of Unison Hymn Singing for publication, for which he also wrote the appendix.

== Works ==
- on Choral works for Queen Victoria. Toccata Classics 2008
