= Charles Harford Lloyd =

English composer and organist (1849–1919)

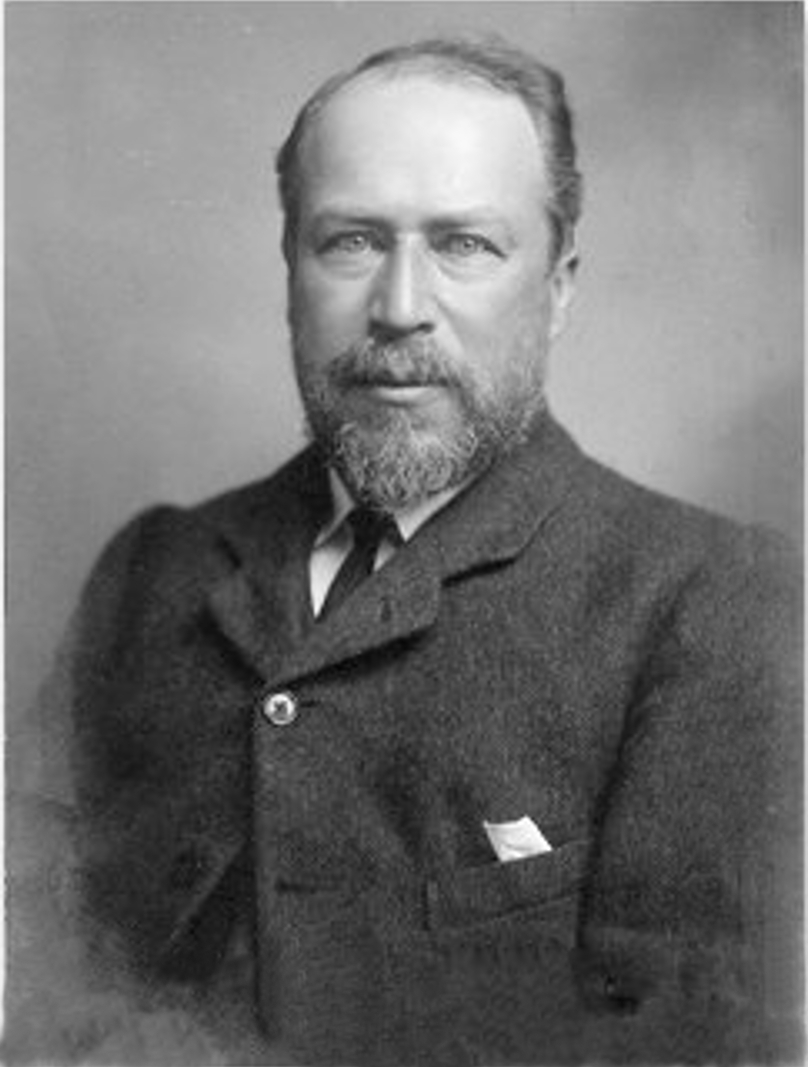
- Lloyd in 1900
- Born: 16 October 1849; Thornbury, Gloucestershire, England
- Died: 16 October 1919 (aged 70); Eton, Berkshire, England
- Occupations: Composer; organist

Charles Harford Lloyd (Thornbury, 16 October 1849 – Eton, 16 October 1919) was an English composer who became a well-known organist in his time.

His most successful field was organ and choral works, though he wrote three clarinet pieces for his friend Randle Fynes Holme (1864–1957), a talented amateur musician; a number of chamber works; a Festival Overture for orchestra; an organ concerto with orchestra; and a number of songs for voice and piano.

He served as organist and choirmaster at Gloucester Cathedral, Christ Church Cathedral in Oxford, Eton College Chapel and organist at the Chapel Royal. His most frequently performed works today are his settings of the Anglican Church liturgy.

He had a lifelong friendship with Hubert Parry.

== Early years ==
Charles Harford Lloyd was born on 16 October 1849 to a Gloucestershire solicitor, Edmund Lloyd. Charlie, as his intimates called him, began to play the piano at an early age, receiving his first instruction from a governess. When he was ten years old, he played the organ at the neighbouring church of Rangeworthy, where his brother-in-law was the vicar, as well as another nearby village of Falfield. He attended the grammar school of his native town for his general education.

In 1862, aged thirteen, he took lessons in piano and harmony with John Barrett, of Bristol, who introduced him to the works of Beethoven and Bach. "He simply revelled in Bach's Forty-eight Preludes and Fugues", said Barrett. He also started composing at an early age, composing a mazurka he called "The Pearl of Denmark", in honour of the Princess of Wales Alexandra of Denmark, and settings of two poems of Tennyson, when he was fourteen.

From 1865 to 1868, he was a pupil at the Rossall School in Lancashire. Here, he took organ lessons with Charles Handel Tovey, music-master of the school, who introduced him to the more contemporary works of Édouard Batiste and Lefébure-Wély. At Rossall, he played the organ in the school chapel and composed "Carmen Rossalliense", which became the school song.

== Magdalen Hall ==
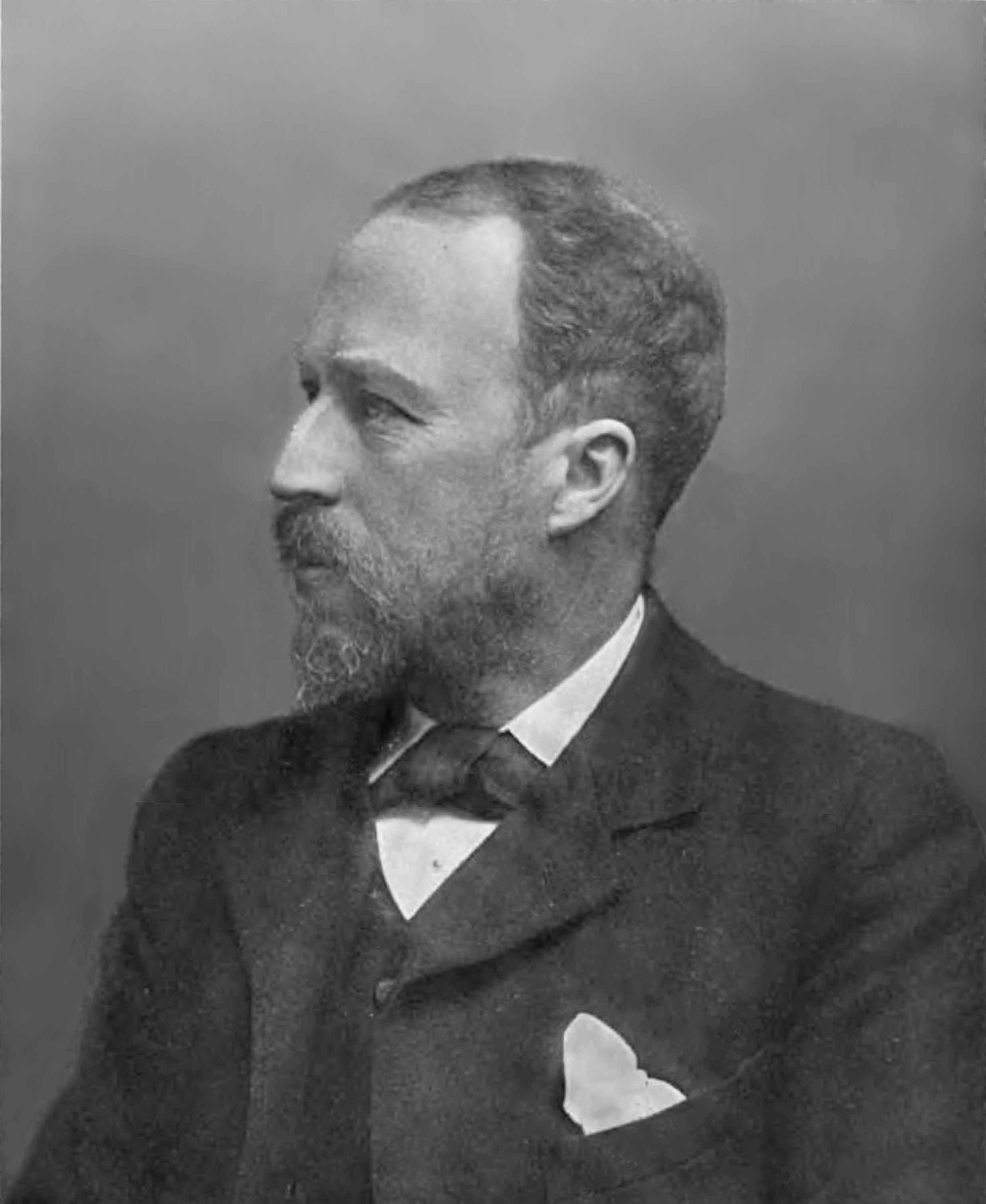
Lloyd, 1899

A friend of his boyhood was Lady Jenkinson, who had been a pupil of Sigismond Thalberg. Lloyd met Frederick Ouseley and Thomas Gambier Parry at her house. The latter invited him to visit Highnam Court, where Lloyd first met his "attached friend of after years", Hubert Parry. They both stayed up till the small hours making music in the drawing room.

In 1868, Lloyd obtained an open scholarship at Magdalen Hall (later renamed Hertford College), where he matriculated 17 October 1868. While studying there, Lloyd was founder, with Hubert Parry, and first president of the Oxford University musical club. He took his B.A. degree in 1872, taking a second class in Classical Mods and Theology, however music was quietly taking possession of his life. He was greatly influenced by the organist of Magdalen College, John Stainer, who gave him lessons in harmony but, more importantly, inspired him musically – "I gained an experience of untold value to me in watching him as he played".

== Oxford ==
Lloyd took his B.Mus at Oxford in 1871. His examiners were Ouseley, Charles William Corfe (1814–1883) and Stainer. To make some money, he played the harmonium at Pembroke College Chapel and conducted the Glee Club there. He frequently played duets with Prince Leopold, Duke of Albany and he and Parry played at private gatherings at Cowley House, the residence of Sir Benjamin Brodie. While at Oxford, he was the conductor of a society of undergraduates who called themselves the "Harmonomaniacs". In April 1872, as mentioned above, Lloyd and Parry established the more serious Oxford University Musical Club. The club, known in Oxford as the O.U.M.C., became an important public institution. One of his close friends at Oxford was Sir Walter Parratt.

== Tutor ==
After Oxford, Lloyd had no idea what he wanted to do with his life, so he became a private tutor to the children of socialites. These included the children of the Vernon Harcourts, Lord Inverclyde (then John Burns), of Cunard fame, at Castle Wemyss. At Skelmorlie on the Clyde, he sometimes played the organ in the Presbyterian Church. He saw a great deal of Millais and his wife in Scotland and, through an introduction from them, he visited the Countess Gigliucci (Clara Novello) in Italy. The countess was very impressed with his music-making and was instrumental in Henry Littleton, the proprietor of the music-publishing company Novello & Co, founded by her father Vincent Novello, taking him on as a client. Lloyd said, "But for their helping hand I doubt if any of my compositions would have seen the light. As it is, I have seldom if ever shown them anything which they have refused to publish."

== Organist positions ==
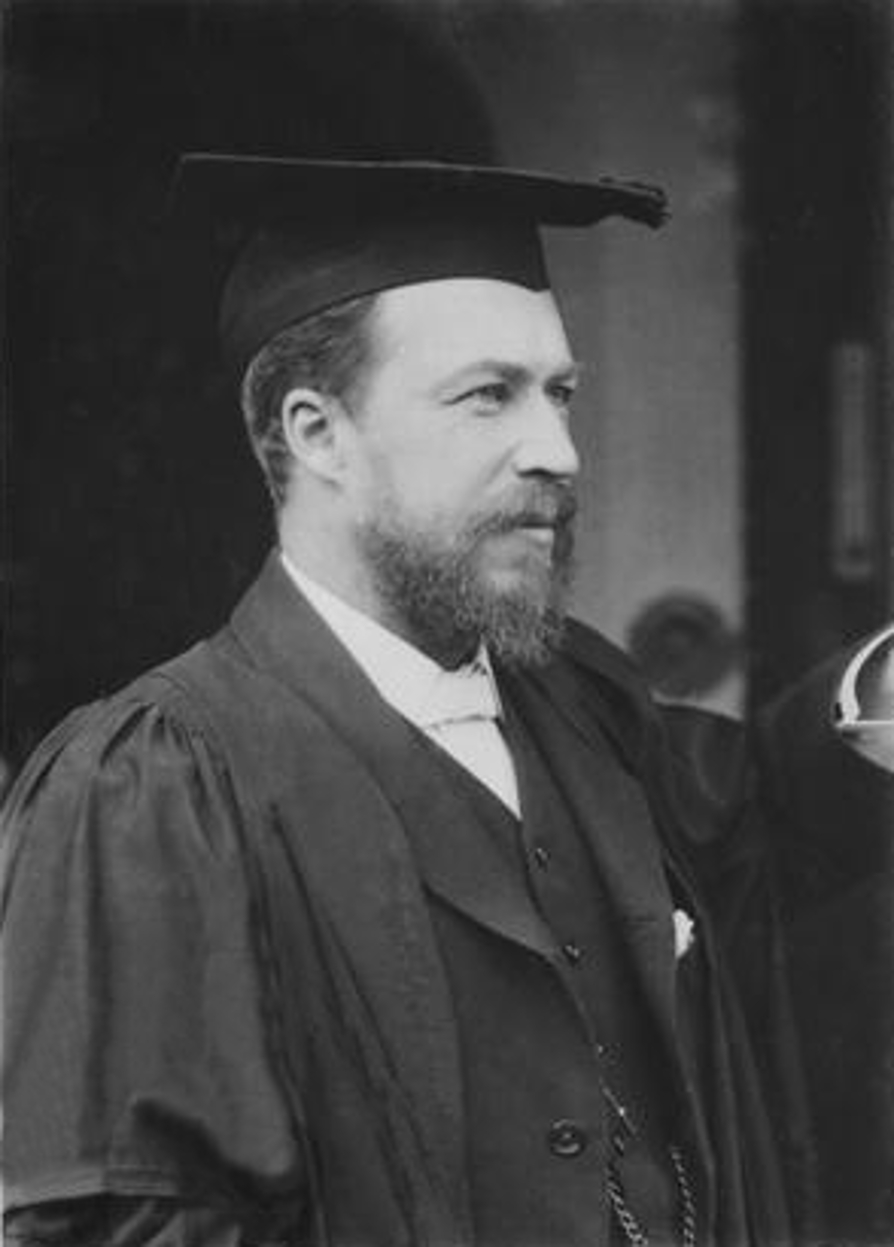
Harford Lloyd conducting

In 1875, The Dean and Chapter of Gloucester Cathedral had approached Lloyd about taking on the classical mastership of the Cathedral Choir School. As it happened, the organist at Gloucester, Samuel Sebastian Wesley, died the following year and the position was immediately offered to Lloyd. This caused dissatisfaction in some musical circles because Lloyd was an unknown at the time, but he soon earned a reputation as an outstanding musician and their fears were put to rest.

The Gloucester organist position carried with it the important office of the Three Choirs Festival, which was held in Gloucester every three years (at that time). Lloyd's first festival was in 1877, for which he selected Brahms' Requiem. A review in The Musical Times stated: "...the intelligence he evinced in the endeavour to realise every point indicated by the composer merit the warmest eulogium."

In 1880, the next time the festival was held, he conducted Beethoven's Mass in D and Hubert Parry's Prometheus Unbound. Prosper Sainton was leader of the orchestra for the festival and wrote Lloyd a letter from France praising both his conducting and Parry's work. Parry was delighted because the critics had not been kind to it. Two of Lloyd's organ pupils, while he was at Gloucester, became well-known organists themselves – they were A. Herbert Brewer, who succeeded him at Gloucester and George Robertson Sinclair who became organist at Hereford Cathedral. Lloyd was organist of Gloucester Cathedral 1876–1881. He was succeeded by Charles Lee Williams.

While at Gloucester Cathedral, Lloyd became the Honorary Secretary of an organisation called Cathedral Organists of England and Wales, which worked for better working and living conditions for organists and choristers. (Note: The resolutions passed in February 1880 stated: 1.— It is desirable that no cathedral choir should consist of less than 20 boys and 12 men (4 altos, 4 tenors, 4 basses); and that means should be placed at the disposal of the organist for preparing boys to fill up the vacancies occurring from time to time.: 2. That the chorister boys should be boarded, lodged, and educated free of expense, in a school specially set apart for the purpose; and that facilities should be afforded for giving them a classical education.; 3.—That in consideration of the increase in the number of cathedral services, and the high standard of musical efficiency required by the public, it is desirable that the stipend of every cathedral organist should be raised to an amount which would enable him to devote more personal attention to the cathedral work and render him less bound to give lessons as a means of livelihood. It is considered that a cathedral organist should not receive less than £400 per annum, and that a suitable house near the cathedral should be provided for him rent free, or that he should receive an equivalent. 4.—That the salary of lay clerks or singing men should not be less than £20 per annum. 5.—That in the event of an organist or singing man becoming incapacitated for work, the dean and chapter should have the means to provide a suitable pension for such persons. Also, that after a certain term of service, the organist and singing men should become entitled to a fair pension.)

At the invitation of Dean Henry Liddell, Lloyd became organist at Christ Church Cathedral, Oxford (1882–1891). While in Oxford he took his degree of Doctor of Music in 1890. He was appointed to a specially created lectureship in music at Christ Church and at various times he conducted the Oxford Choral Society, the Oxford Philharmonic Society and the Oxford Orchestral Association; but the most important concerts he directed were a series of Public Classical Concerts organised by the University Musical Club on the initiative of William Henry Hadow which continued for six seasons (1891–1897).

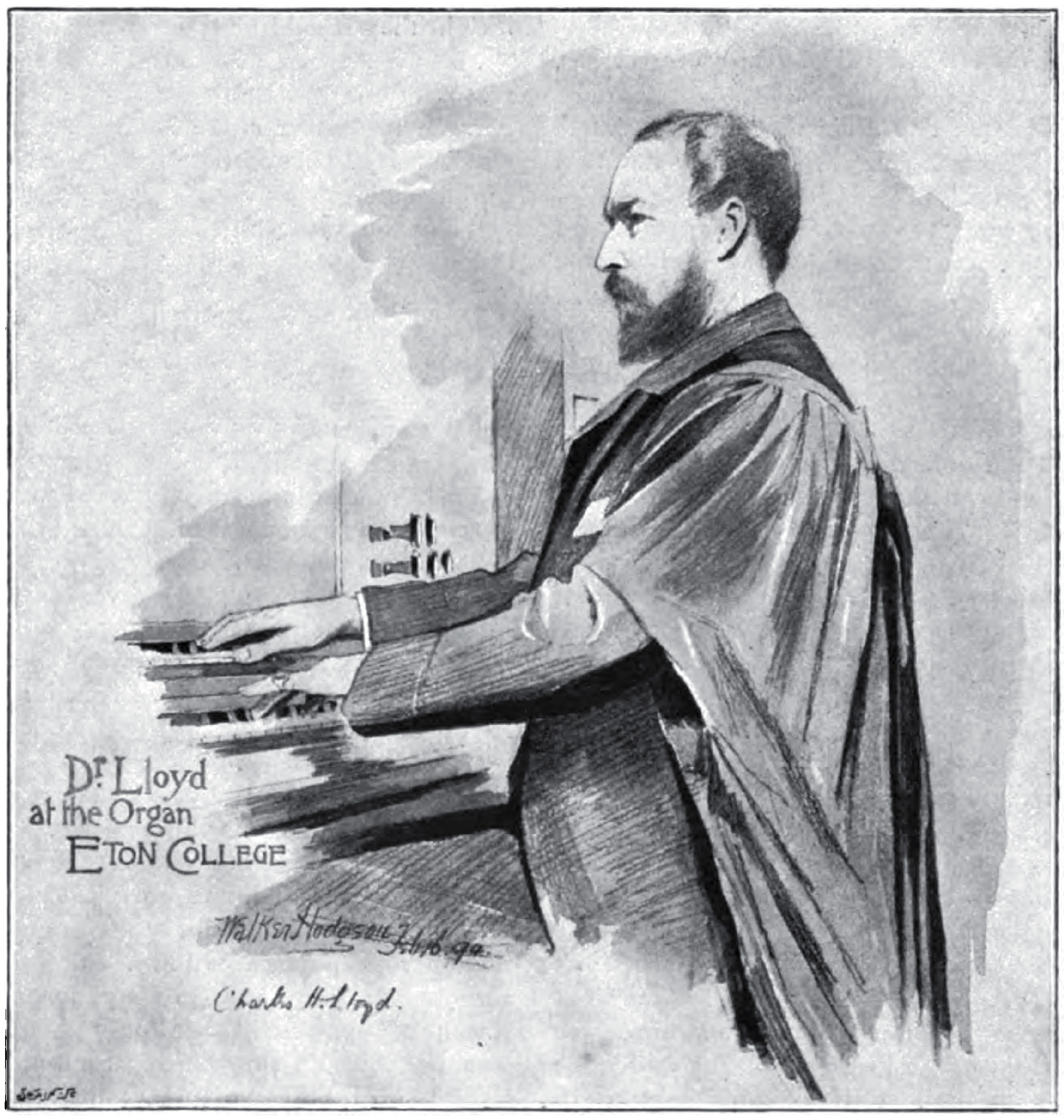
C. H. Lloyd at Eton

In 1886, Lloyd submitted a cantata, Andromeda to the Three Choirs Festival. It received a favourable but reserved review in The Musical Times. (Note: "Andromeda," produced on 7 September, was generally, recognised as a scholarly and musicianly work, although the composer was accused by some of his critics of undue modesty and lack of dramatic force. Mr. Weatherly, the librettist, has made some slight alterations in the old myth. Andromeda, in the course of a chain of choruses, which contain some of the best music of the cantata, is rowed out to sea and is left chained to the rock, at the mercy of the sea monster. Sea maidens and tritons arise from the ocean and apostrophise the victim. The love-motive eventually announces the rescuer, Perseus. A love duet is sung, and Perseus retires behind a rock to fight the monster, the sea maidens praying for victory and joining in the song of love's triumph when the enemy is slain and the lovers are united.)

From 1887 to 1892, Lloyd was an instructor in organ and composition at the Royal College of Music.

Lloyd was invited to fill the position of music teacher at Eton College from 1892, when Sir Joseph Barnby resigned. As Instructor of Music, his work was largely that of supervision with six music teachers under him. He played the organ in the Eton College Chapel every morning and afternoon, as well as on Sundays, and rehearsed the choir. He also gave frequent organ recitals on Sunday evenings. One of his pupils at Eton was Frederick Septimus Kelly, whose musical inclinations were greatly inspired by him.

After retirement from Eton, Lloyd was appointed organist at the Chapel Royal, St James's Palace from 1914, a post he held until his death. He was succeeded by Stanley Roper.

Who's Who of 1906 described Lloyd's recreations as "figure skating, cycling, boating, golf". Lloyd died "very suddenly" on his birthday on 16 October 1919. He was seventy years old that day. The funeral took place at Eton on 21 October 1919. In addition to other works, the Eton College Chapel Choir sang Lloyd's anthem Christ was Delivered for Our Offences.

In 1920, a brass plaque commemorating Lloyd was placed in the Eton College Chapel. It is inscribed in Latin thus, and the following translation appeared in the Musical Times:

In dulcem memoriam Caroli Harford Lloyd A.M. D. Mus. qui apud Ecclesiam Cathedralem Gloucestrensem anno MDCCCLXXVI organista factus ibi sex annos exegit dein apud Ecclesiam Cathedralem Christi Oxoniae eodem officio functus annos X Collegii Etonensis Praecentor usque ad annum MCMXIV. eminebat, denique anno MCMXVII Capellarum Regiarum musicae docendae praefectus est.
Natus die XVI^{mo.} Oct. MDCCCXLIX.
Obiit eodem die anno MCMXIX.

"To the dear memory of Charles Harford Lloyd, M.A., Mus.D. Appointed organist of Gloucester Cathedral in 1876 he held that post for six years. Afterwards organist of Christ Church Cathedral, Oxford, for ten years (1882–1892). He held with distinction the post of Precentor at Eton College from 1892 to 1914. Finally appointed Organist (and Composer) to H.M. Chapels Royal; 1917.
Born October 16, 1849. Died October 16, 1919."

== Works ==
=== Orchestral ===
- 1895 – Organ Concerto in F minor (Gloucester Festival, 15 September 1895)
- 1898 – Festival Overture (Gloucester Festival, 11 September 1898)

The righteous live for evermore

Sing Ye to the Lord

=== Choral and vocal ===
- 1883 – Allen-a-Dale (Gloucester Festival, 4 September 1883)
- 1884 – Hero and Leander (Worcester Festival, 9 September 1884)
- 1885 – The Song of Balder (Hereford Festival, 10 September 1885)
- 1886 – Andromeda (Gloucester Festival, 7 September 1886)
- 1887 – The Longbeard's Saga, for male voices (Christ Church, Oxford, 20 June 1887)
- 1888 – The Gleaners' Harvest, cantata for female voices
- 1889 – The Rosy Dawn, pastoral (Leeds Festival, 10 October 1889)
- 1890 – To Morning, eight-part chorus (Worcester Festival, 10 September 1890)
- 1891 – A Song of Judgment, sacred cantata (Hereford Festival, 10 September 1891)
- 1894 – Rossall, ode by Owen Seaman for the 50th anniversary of Rossall School, 1844–1894
- 1894 – Ballad of Sir Ogie and the Ladie Elsie (Hereford Festival, 11 September 1894)
- 1897 – A Hymn of Thanksgiving for the Queen's Long Reign (Hereford Festival, 14 September 1897)
- 1901 – The righteous live for evermore (Gloucester Festival, 11 September 1901)

Men Are Fools That Wish to Die

In Summer Weather

=== Incidental music ===
- 1887 – Alcestis, for flute, clarinet, two harps and male chorus (Dramatic Club, Oxford University, Oxford, 18 May 1887)

=== Part-songs ===
- 1884 – Pack, Clouds, Away!
- 1885 – When at Corinna's Eyes I Gaze, madrigal for five voices
- 1885 – The Patriot
- 1885 – Looking for Spring
- 1890 – A Sunny Shaft Did I Behold
- 1890 – A Wet Sheet and a Flowing Sea
- 1890 – Fly to my Mistress, glee
- 1895 – An Ode on the Birth of Our Saviour, carol
- 1896 – Is not that my Fancy's Queen?
- 1896 – Shall I look to ease my Grief?
- 1897 – Mark when she smiles
- 1897 – Thomalin, why sytten we soe?
- 1897 – In Sherwood lived stout Robin Hood
- 1898 – Men are fools that wish to die
- 1899 – A Thousand Years, by Sea and Land
- 1899 – When first I came to Court
- 1901 – Three Men of Gotham, for male voices
- 1902 – A Loyal Ode, for male voices
- 1903 – Up-Hill
- 1904 – Dear in Death
- 1905 – A Baby's Feet
- 1905 – Give a Man a Horse he can ride
- 1907 – The Battle of the Baltic, choral ballad
- 1907 – Let my voice ring out
- 1909 – Kitty of Coleraine
- 1909 – The Young May Moon
- 1909 – He left the upland Lawns
- 1911 – Our Sailor King
- 1911 – Hither! hither!
- 1913 – A Water Party
- 1916 – Grey Stones

=== Songs ===
- 1876 – Magdalen at St Michael's Gate
- 1886 – Annette, for baritone, piano and clarinet (or violin, viola, or cello)
- 1890 – Twelve by the Clock for female duet
- 1891 – In Summer Weather
- 1895 – Come, Tuneful Friends
- 1897 – To a Skylark, trio for female voices
- 1898 – The Vigil
- 1898 – A Song of Exmoor
- 1898 – Hawke
- 1899 – The Borderers
- 1904 – Dear in Death
- 1904 – Song of the Dunes
- 1908 – He Left the Upland Lawns
- 1909 – Cupid is a Wayward Boy
- 1910 – Lesbia's Sparrow – Passer mortuus est meae puellae
- 1910 – A Little Work, a Little Play
- 1910 – April, April
- 1911 – To Althea, from Prison
- 1913 – O Father all-creating, sacred song
- 1916 – Sweet Dreams, form a Shade
- 1916 – Queen Mab, for children

=== Services, etc. ===
- 1880 – Magnificat and Nunc dimittis in F
- 1880 – Morning and Evening Service in E flat
- 1890 – Magnificat and Nunc dimittis in F
- 1883 – Magnificat and Nunc dimittis in A
- 1883 – Magnificat and Nunc dimittis in G
- 1893 – Magnificat and Nunc dimittis in D
- 1906 – Communion Service in E, for female voices
- 1911 – Magnificat and Nunc dimittis in E, for male voices
- 1911 – Te Deum in E, for male voices
- 1911 – Benedictus in E, for male voices
- 1913 – Communion Service in F
- ?? – Benedicite in E flat (Chant form)

Christ was Delivered for Our Offences
Anthem for choir with organ accompaniment

=== Anthems ===
- 1876 – Blessed is he that considereth the poor and needy, for soprano or tenor solo, chorus and orchestra (or organ)
- 1876 – Give the Lord the Honour
- 1876 – Art thou weary?
- 1883 – Blessed is He
- 1886 – Fear not, O Land, for Harvest
- 1889 – Who are We, O Lord?
- 1890 – In this was manifested the love of God
- 1899 – Lord, teach us to number our Days
- 1903 – Sing Ye to the Lord, for Easter
- 1904 – Blessed be Thou, O Lord God
- 1904 – Praised be the Lord daily
- 1905 – Christ Was Delivered for Our Offences, for Easter
- 1908 – Let us come boldly
- 1917 – Beloved, it is well
- 1918 – Grieve not the Holy Spirit of God
- 1919 – Awaked from Sleep

=== Hymn tunes ===
- 1918 – Contributions to Novello's Parish Choir Book:
1. Give the Lord the Honour
2. A Thirteenth Century Prayer
3. Lie Still Beloved, Lie Still
4. Lord, We Uplift Our Voice
5. Resignation
6. Uprouse Ye, Christian People, for St. George's Day
- c1919 (Published posthumously) – Free Accompaniment of Unison Hymn Singing, ed. A. M. Goodhart

=== Chamber music ===
Prelude

Allemande

Minuet

Sarabande

Gigue
Suite in the Old Style for Clarinet and Pianoforte

- 1888 – Bon voyage for clarinet
- 1888 – Duo concertante for violin (or viola, or clarinet) and piano
- 1900 – Trio for piano, clarinet, and bassoon
- 1912 – Six Easy Pieces for violin and piano
- 1912 – Four Characteristic Pieces for violin and piano
1. – In modo d'una sonata
2. – Cavatina
3. – Mazurka
4. – Moto perpetuo
- 1912 – Idyll for violin and piano
- 1914 – Suite in the Old Style for clarinet (or viola) and piano
1. – Prelude
2. – Allemande
3. – Minuet
4. – Sarabande
5. – Gigue
- 1919 – Three Little Pieces for violin (or clarinet) and piano: Romance, A simple melody and Valse mignonne
- 1919 – Four Miniatures for violin and piano: Morning song, Lullaby, Dirge and Hornpipe
- 1919 – Le Départ for cello and piano

=== Piano ===
- 1910 – Two Album Leaves: Good Morning! and Good Night
- 1918 – Glyndebourne Dances, suite
- 1918 – Two Concert Studies: Toccata and Moto Perpetuo

Allegro Agitato

Study in Canon

Elegy

Passacaglia from A Song of Judgment
Arranged for organ by A. Herbert Brewer

=== Organ ===
- 1883 – Allegretto in E
- 1886 – Sonata in D minor
- 1896 – Allegro agitato
- 1896 – Study in canon
- 1897 – Elegy
- 1917 – Elegy No.2
- Theme, Variations and Finale, edited 1920 by A. Herbert Brewer

== Scores and manuscripts ==
Novello, Ewer & Co., London, published the vocal scores of Alcestis, Andromeda, Hero and Leander, A Hymn of Thanksgiving for the Queen's Long Reign, The Longbeard's Saga, O give thanks unto the Lord, Rossall, The Rosy Dawn, The righteous live for evermore, The Ballad of Sir Ogie and the Ladie Elsie, The Song of Balder and A Song of Judgment.

The autograph score of Andromeda is at the British Library, London (Add MS 50772). Autograph scores of The Ballad of Sir Ogie and the Ladie Elsie, Give the Lord the honour, The Longbeard's Saga, the Magnificat and Nunc dimittis in A, the Magnificat and Nunc dimittis in F and A Song of Judgment are held by the Library of the Royal College of Music, London (Add.Mss 5133).

== Publications ==
- "THE ROYAL COLLEGE OF MUSIC; What Results may be anticipated from the new Royal College of Music; (a) as regards its Influence on the British Public as a Musical Public; (&) as regards the Re-establishment of a National School of Composition?" (1883) Transactions of the National Association for the Promotion of Social Science, London: Longman's, Green & Co.

== Recordings ==
- "A Thousand Years, by Sea and Land" (to the "Ode to Queen Victoria" of Henry Newbolt) — on Spiritus Chamber Choir, Choral Songs in Honour of Her Majesty Queen Victoria, Track 3, Toccata Classics TOOC 0012 (2009)
- "Bon Voyage!" on The Victorian Clarinet Tradition, Colin Bradbury, clarinet, and Oliver Davies, piano. Clarinet Classics CC0022 (1997)
- Chamber Music for Clarinet, including the Clarinet Trio, Duo Concertante, Annette, Suite in the Old Style, Le Départ, Three Little Pieces, Idyll. Metthew Nelson (clarinet), Alexander Volpov (cello), Chad Sloan (baritone), Anna Petrova (piano).Toccata TOCC 0768 (2025)
- Magnificat & Nunc Dimittis Vol. 1, including Magnificat and Nunc dimittis in A, Gloucester Cathedral Choir. Priory PRCD494 (1994)

== Notes ==
Cultural offices
Preceded by Samuel Sebastian Wesley	Organist and Master of the Choristers of Gloucester Cathedral; 1876–1882	Succeeded by Charles Williams
Preceded by Charles Corfe	Organist and Master of the Choristers of Christ Church Cathedral, Oxford; 1882–1892	Succeeded by Basil Harwood
