= Toccata Classics =

- Founded: 2005
- Founder: Martin Anderson
- Status: Active
- Genre: Classical music
- Country of origin: United Kingdom
- Location: London
- Official website: toccataclassics.com

Toccata Classics is an independent British classic music label founded in 2005.

The founder of Toccata Classics is Martin Anderson, a music journalist. The label was founded primarily to promote unrecorded works by lesser-known composers, including British composers. By 2022 there were around 600 albums in the catalogue. The sponsors of the label were the late Josef Suk, with Vladimir Ashkenazy and Jon Lord.

== Artists ==
Recordings include lesser known works by:

- Alkan
- Eyvind Alnæs
- Algernon Ashton
- Vytautas Bacevicius
- J. S. Bach/(arr. Sigfrid Karg-Elert)
- Mily Balakirev
- Beethoven/(arr. Karl Xaver Kleinheinz & Friedrich Hermann)
- Georg von Bertouch
- David Braid
- Havergal Brian
- Julius Bürger
- Adolf Busch
- Bellerofonte Castaldi
- Henry Walford Davies
- Edison Denisov
- Steve Elcock
- Heino Eller
- Enescu
- Heinrich Wilhelm Ernst
- Ferenc Farkas
- Arthur Farwell
- Richard Flury
- Jean Françaix
- Herman Galynin
- John Gardner
- Friedrich Gernsheim
- Peggy Glanville-Hicks
- Aleksandr Goldenweiser
- Arthur M. Goodhart
- Albert Guinovart
- Arthur Hartmann
- Heinrich von Herzogenberg
- Mary Howe
- Anselm Hüttenbrenner
- Salomon Jadassohn
- Vladas Jakubenas
- John Joubert
- Khrennikov
- Nikolai Korndorf
- Viktor Stepanovych Kosenko
- Mario Lavista
- Benjamin Lees
- Yuri Levitin
- Charles Harford Lloyd
- Anatoly Lyadov
- Boris Lyatoshynsky
- Sir Alexander Campbell Mackenzie
- Edward Macdowell
- Ester Mägi
- Riccardo Malipiero
- Sir George Martin
- David Matthews
- Janis Medinš
- Krzysztof Meyer
- Robin Milford
- Joaquín Nin-Culmell
- Reinhard Oppel
- Leo Ornstein
- Buxton Orr
- Sir Walter Parratt
- Nikolay Ivanovich Peyko
- John Pickard
- Peteris Plakidis
- Alexander Prior
- Phillip Ramey
- Günter Raphael
- Igor Raykhelson
- Reicha
- Julius Röntgen
- Shebalin
- Percy Sherwood
- Shostakovich
- Leone Sinigaglia
- John Stafford Smith
- Arthur Somervell
- Philip Spratley
- Sir John Stainer
- Peeter Süda
- Marko Tajcevic
- Matthew Taylor
- Jan Ladislav Dussek
- Boris Tchaikovsky
- Alexander Tcherepnin
- Nikolai Tcherepnin
- Telemann
- Ferdinand Thieriot
- Veljo Tormis
- Sir Donald Tovey
- Sergei Vassilenko
- Gareth Walters
- Mieczyslaw Weinberg
- Hans Winterberg
- Charles Wood
- Hugh Wood
- William Wordsworth
- Felix Woyrsch
- and others
