= Igor Raykhelson =

American jazz musician

Igor Raykhelson (Russian: Игорь Райхельсон; born 24 April 1961 in Leningrad) is a Russian born American classical and jazz pianist and composer. He studied classical and jazz piano as a teenager at Leningrad Conservatory from 1976 then in 1979 his family moved to New York City where Igor continued his education at New York University under Alexander Edelman. His Jazz Suite and works for viola performed by Yuri Bashmet were well received by Gramophone Magazine in 2007.

His chamber works have been performed at the Verbier Festival, including his first Piano Quartet in 2025 and his second Piano Quintet in 2026. In September 2025, Raykhelson was awarded the Villa Bertelli Prize, which was won by Andrea Bocelli the prior year.

On the 25th anniversary of the 9/11 terror attacks in 2026, Raykhelson staged a free concert, titled Armonie di Pace (“Harmonies of Peace”), in the historic Piazza del Duomo in Tuscany. Raykhelson was living in New York during 9/11, and he wrote “Adagio”, which premiered in Carnegie Hall in 2003, as a tribute.

== Works, editions and recordings ==
- Igor Raykhelson: Jazz Suite and other works. Little Symphony for Strings in G minor. Reflections for Violin, Viola and Strings. Adagio for Viola and Strings. Jazz Suite for Viola, Saxophone and Orchestra. Elena Revich, violin, Igor Butman, saxophone. Igor Raykhelson, piano. Yuri Golubev, double-bass. Eduard Zizak, drums. Moscow-Soloists, ensemble. Yuri Bashmet, viola, conductor.
- Igor Raykhelson: Violin Concerto in C minor. Viola Concerto in A minor. Yuri Bashmet, viola, Nikolay Sachenko, violin. Novaya Rossiya Orchestra, orchestra Claudio Vandelli, conductor Alexander Sladkovsky, conductor

== Legal issues ==
Raykhelson is the founder of the Switzerland-based titanium company Interlink Metals and Chemicals, which has been involved in a commercial dispute with the Russian titanium producer PJSC VSMPO-AVISMA.

In March 2026, media reported that Russian authorities had accused Raykhelson of involvement in an alleged fraud scheme connected to the supply of titanium to VSMPO-AVISMA, claiming he had colluded to overcharge the company by millions of dollars. Raykhelson has denied the allegations, describing the case as a politically motivated "shakedown" tied to the commercial dispute and saying the titanium he supplied was western-grade scrap intended for Western products rather than the Russian military.

Raykhelson said he would "fight them to the end" and denied all accusations made in VSMPO's lawsuit against him and the metals trading company he founded. He also accused them of violating an agreement they both had signed which previously settled the dispute.

In early 2026, the Cantonal Court of Vaud in Switzerland dismissed an appeal by Interlink and upheld the cancellation of an asset freeze it had sought against VSMPO-AVISMA, ordering Interlink to pay costs. Raykhelson also filed an application in a New York court seeking evidence from financial institutions to defend himself against the Russian charges.
