= Dahm (surname) =

Dahm is a surname. Notable people with the surname include:

- Britta Dahm (born 1968), German breaststroke swimmer
- Christian Dahm (born 1963), German politician
- Daniel Dahm (born 1969), German geographer and ecologist
- Fredrik Dahm (born 1982), Norwegian footballer
- Gyda Dahm (1851–1906), birth name of Gyda Gram, Norwegian painter
- Helen Dahm (1878–1968), Swiss artist
- Jan Dahm (1921–2013), Norwegian resistance member during World War II
- Mads Dahm (born 1988), Norwegian footballer
- Nathan Dahm (born c. 1983), American politician from Oklahoma
- Paul Dahm (born 1951), Luxembourgian composer
- Rich Dahm, American television writer
- Sebastian Dahm (born 1987), Danish professional ice hockey player
- Tobias Dahm (born 1987), German athlete specializing in shot put
- Werner Dahm (1917–2008), German spaceflight scientist
- Werner J. A. Dahm (born 1957), American aeronautical engineer
- Nicole, Erica and Jaclyn Dahm (born 1977), American triplet models
- Evan Dahm (born 1987), American webcartoonist
- Lauren Dahm (born 1989), American ice hockey goaltender
- George Dahm (1916–1980), American rower
- Jack Dahm (born 1967), American baseball coach

== See also ==
- Dahms, surname
- Adolf Dahm-Petersen (1856 – 1922), Norwegian voice specialist and teacher of artistic singing
