= Dahm =

Dahm may refer to:

- Dahm (surname), list of people with the surname
- Dahm House, historic townhouse in Mobile, Alabama
- Dahm, Iran, village
- Dahman, a Zoroastrian concept

== See also ==
- Dahms, surname
- Dam, a barrier that impounds water
- Dahme (disambiguation)
