= Factions in the Republican Party (United States) =

Ideological and political wings of the Republican Party

The Republican Party in the United States includes several factions, or wings. During the 19th century, Republican factions included the Half-Breeds, who supported civil service reform; the Radical Republicans, who advocated the immediate and total abolition of slavery, and later advocated civil rights for freedmen during the Reconstruction era; and the Stalwarts, who supported machine politics.

In the 20th century, Republican factions included the Progressive Republicans, the Reagan coalition, and the liberal Rockefeller Republicans.

In the 21st century, Republican factions include conservatives (represented in the House by the Republican Study Committee and the Freedom Caucus), moderates (represented in the House by the Republican Governance Group, Main Street Caucus, and the Republican members of the Problem Solvers Caucus), and libertarians (represented in Congress by the Republican Liberty Caucus). During the first presidency of Donald Trump, Trumpist and Never Trump factions arose within the Republican Party.

== 21st-century factions ==
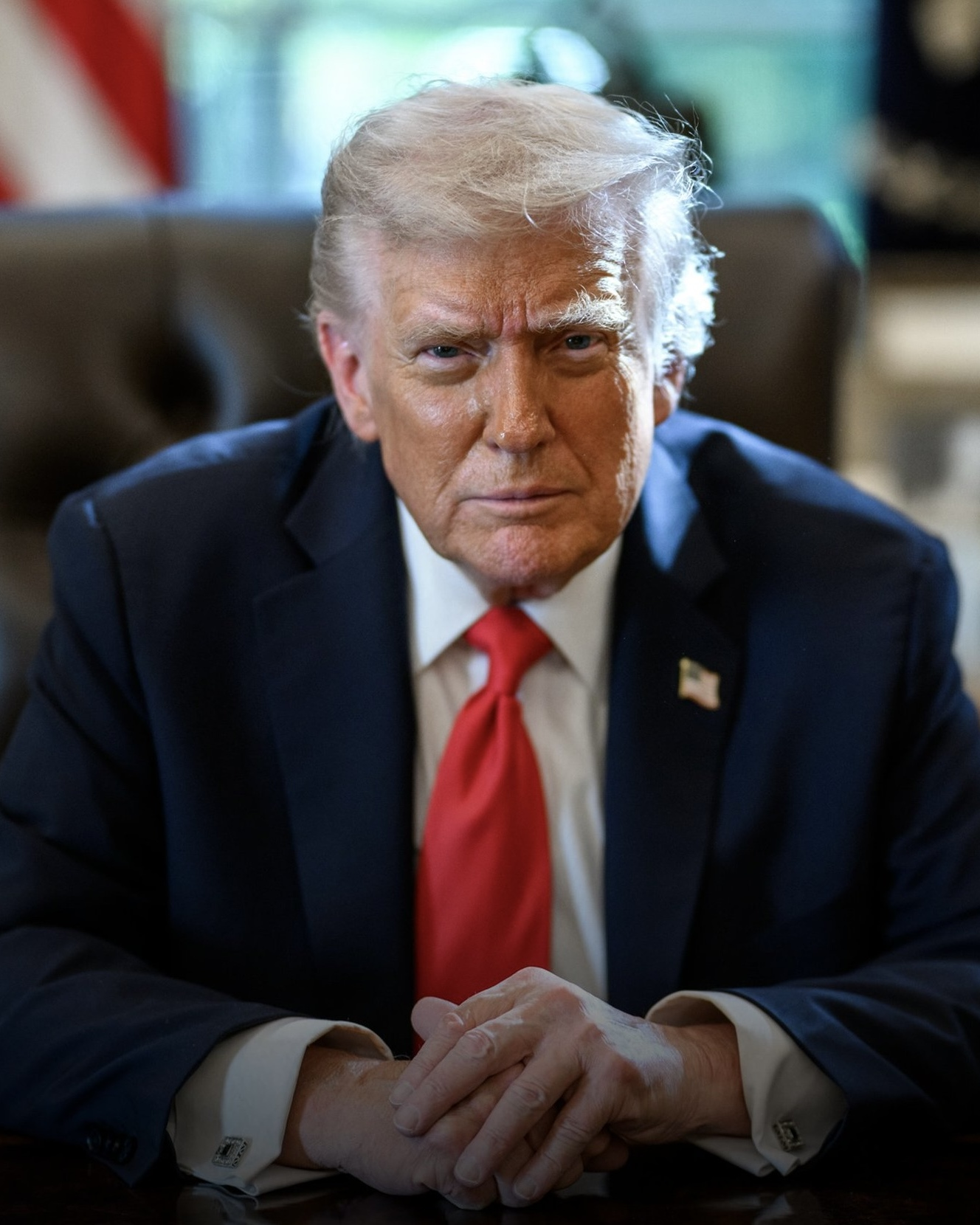
Donald Trump, the 45th and 47th president of the United States, has been widely credited for realigning the Republican Party away from conservatism and more toward nationalism.

During the presidency of Barack Obama, the Republican Party experienced internal conflict between its governing class (known as the Republican establishment) and the anti-establishment, small-government Tea Party movement. In 2019, during the presidency of Donald Trump, Perry Bacon Jr. of FiveThirtyEight.com asserted that there were five groups of Republicans: Trumpists, Pro-Trumpers, Trump-Skeptical Conservatives, Trump-Skeptical Moderates, and Anti-Trumpers.

In February 2021, following Trump's 2020 loss to Democrat Joe Biden and the 2021 United States Capitol attack, Philip Bump of The Washington Post posited that the Republican Party in the U.S. House of Representatives consisted of three factions: the Trumpists (who voted against the second impeachment of Donald Trump in 2021, voted against stripping Marjorie Taylor Greene of her committee assignments, and supported efforts to overturn the results of the 2020 presidential election), the accountability caucus (who supported either the Trump impeachment, the effort to discipline Greene, or both), and the anti-Trump Republicans (who opposed the Trump impeachment and the effort to discipline Greene but also opposed efforts to overturn the 2020 presidential election results). Also in February 2021, Carl Leubsdorf of the Dallas Morning News asserted that there were three groups of Republicans: Never Trumpers (including Bill Kristol, Sen. Mitt Romney, and governors Charlie Baker and Larry Hogan), Sometimes Trumpers (including Senate Minority Leader Mitch McConnell and former U.N. Ambassador Nikki Haley), and Always Trumpers (including Sens. Ted Cruz and Josh Hawley).

In March 2021, one survey indicated that five factions of Republican voters had emerged following Trump's presidency: Never Trump, Post-Trump G.O.P. (voters who liked Trump but did not want him to run for president again), Trump Boosters (voters who approved of Trump, but identified more closely with the Republican Party than with Trump), Die-hard Trumpers, and Infowars G.O.P. (voters who subscribe to conspiracy theories). In November 2021, Pew Research Center identified four Republican-aligned groups of Americans: Faith and Flag Conservatives, Committed Conservatives, the Populist Right, and the Ambivalent Right.

As of 2023, congressional Republicans refer to the various House Republican factions as the Five Families. Derived from The Godfather, the term refers to Mafia crime families. The Five Families consist of "the right-wing House Freedom Caucus, the conservative Republican Study Committee, the business-minded Main Street Caucus, the mainstream Republican Governance Group", and the Republican members of the bipartisan Problem Solvers Caucus. The House Republican factions overlap with one another, and some members belong to no caucus.

=== Conservatives ===
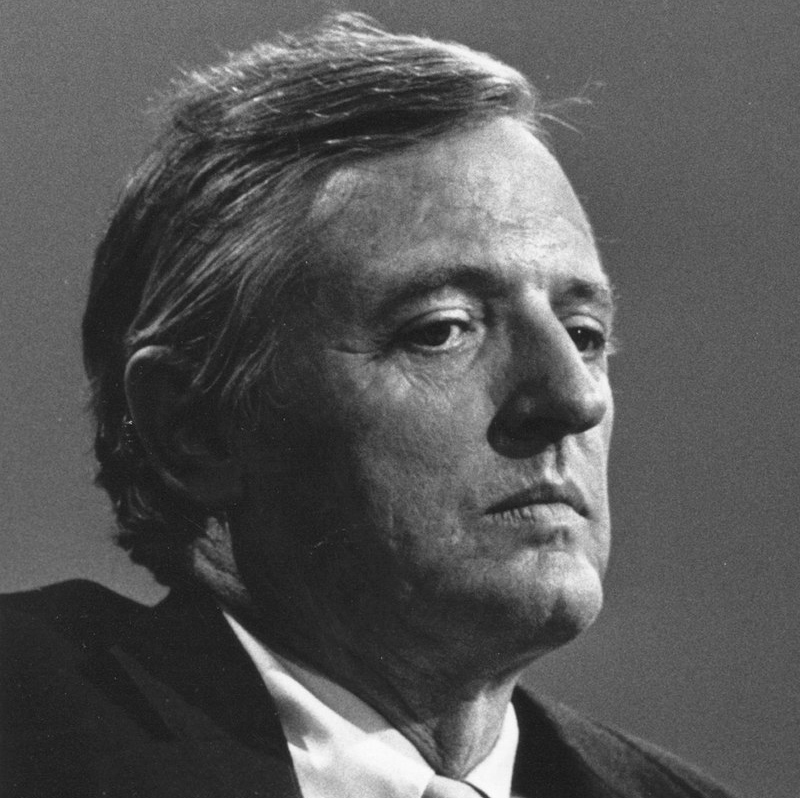
William F. Buckley Jr. is considered one of the earliest and most influential figures of the conservative movement.

The conservative wing grew out of the 1950s and 1960s, with its initial leaders being Senator Robert A. Taft, Russell Kirk, and William F. Buckley Jr. Its central tenets include the promotion of individual liberty and free-market economics and opposition to labor unions, high taxes, and government regulation. The Republican Party has undergone a major decrease in the influence of its establishment conservative faction since the election of Donald Trump in 2016.

In economic policy, conservatives call for a large reduction in government spending, less regulation of the economy, and privatization or changes to Social Security. Supporters of supply-side economics and fiscal conservatives predominate, but there are deficit hawks and protectionists within the party as well. Before 1930, the Northeastern industrialist faction of the GOP was strongly committed to high tariffs, a political stance that returned to popularity in many conservative circles during the Trump presidency. The conservative wing typically supports socially conservative positions, such as supporting gun rights and restrictions on abortion, though there is a wide range of views on such issues within the party.

Percent of self-identified conservatives by state in 2010: 49% and above 45–48% 41–44% 37–40% 33–36% 32% and under

Conservatives generally oppose affirmative action, support increased military spending, and are opposed to gun control. On the issue of school vouchers, conservative Republicans split between supporters who believe that "big government education" is a failure and opponents who fear greater government control over private and church schools. Parts of the conservative wing have been criticized for being anti-environmentalist and promoting climate change denial in opposition to the general scientific consensus, making them unique even among other worldwide conservative parties.

Long-term shifts in conservative thinking following the election of Trump have been described as a "new fusionism" of traditional conservative ideology and right-wing populist themes. These have resulted in shifts towards greater support of national conservatism, protectionism, cultural conservatism, a more realist foreign policy, skepticism of neoconservatism, reduced efforts to roll back entitlement programs, and a disdain for traditional checks and balances.

=== Christian right ===
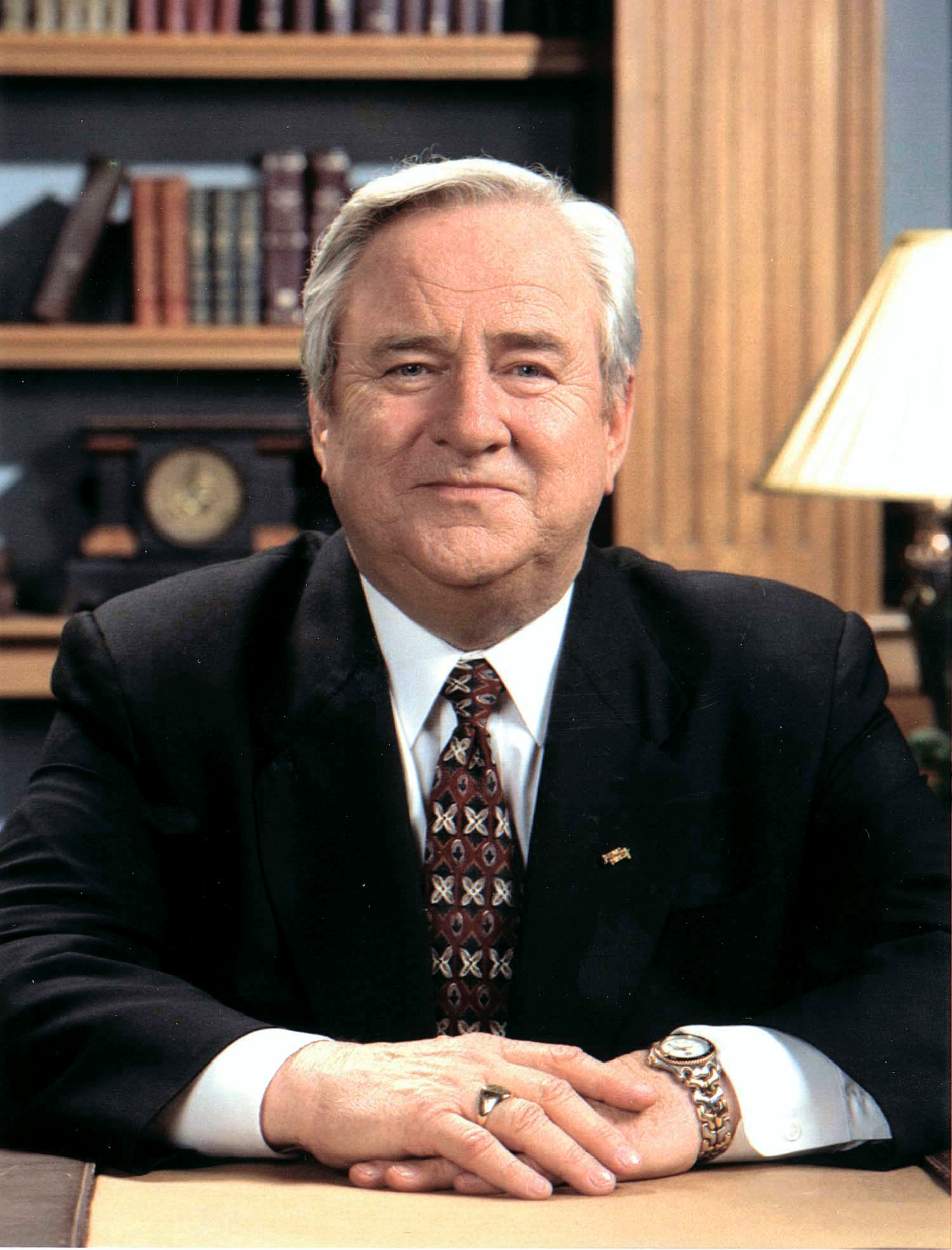
Jerry Falwell, whose founding of the "Moral Majority" was a key step in the formation of the New Christian Right

The Christian right is a conservative Christian Political faction characterized by strong support of socially conservative and Christian nationalist policies. Christian conservatives seek to use the teachings of Christianity to influence law and public policy.

In the United States, the Christian right is an informal coalition formed around a core of evangelical Protestants and conservative Roman Catholics, as well as a large number of Latter-day Saints (Mormons). The movement has its roots in American politics going back as far as the 1940s and has been especially influential since the 1970s. In the late 20th century, the Christian right became strongly connected to the Republican Party. Republican politicians associated with the Christian right in the 21st century include Tennessee Senator Marsha Blackburn, former Arkansas Governor Mike Huckabee, and former Senator Rick Santorum. Many within the Christian right have also identified as social conservatives, which sociologist Harry F. Dahms has described as Christian doctrinal conservatives (anti-abortion, anti-LGBT rights) and gun-rights conservatives (pro-NRA) as the two domains of ideology within social conservatism. Christian nationalists generally seek to declare the U.S. a Christian nation, enforce Christian values, and overturn the separation of church and state.

=== Libertarians ===
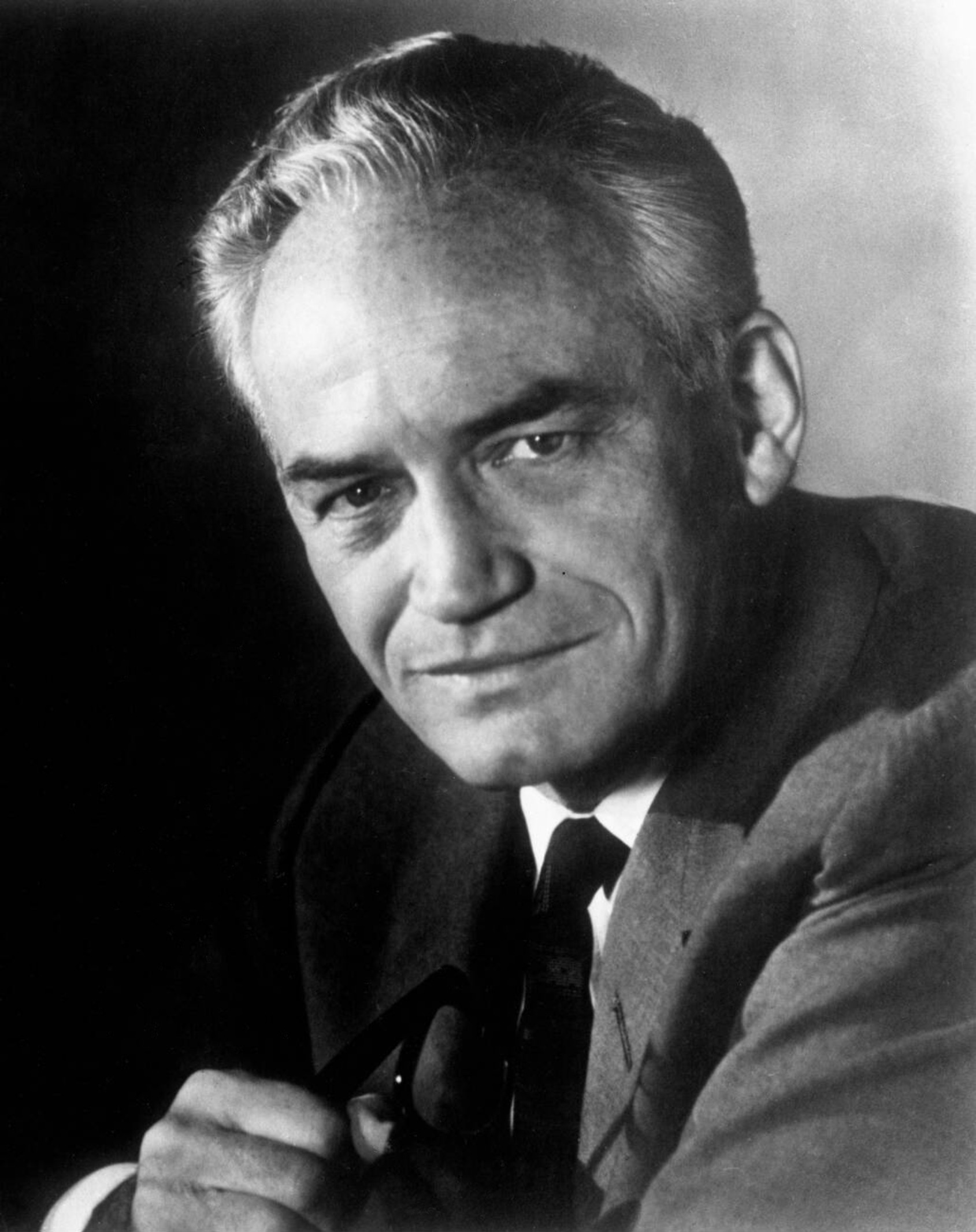
Senator Barry Goldwater had a substantial impact on the libertarian conservative movement of the 1960s and beyond.

Libertarians make up a relatively small faction of the Republican Party. In the 1950s and 60s, fusionism—the combination of traditionalist and social conservatism with political and economic right-libertarianism—was essential to the movement's growth. This philosophy is most closely associated with Frank Meyer. Barry Goldwater also had a substantial impact on the conservative-libertarian movement of the 1960s.

Libertarian conservatives in the 21st century favor cutting taxes and regulations, repealing the Affordable Care Act, and protecting gun rights. On social issues, they favor privacy, oppose the USA Patriot Act, and oppose the war on drugs. On foreign policy, libertarian conservatives favor non-interventionism. The Republican Liberty Caucus, which describes itself as "the oldest continuously operating organization in the Liberty Republican movement with state charters nationwide", was founded in 1991. The House Liberty Caucus is a congressional caucus formed by former Representative Justin Amash, a former Republican of Michigan who joined the Libertarian Party in 2020 before returning in 2024.

Prominent libertarian conservatives within the Republican Party include New Hampshire Governor Chris Sununu, Senators Mike Lee and Rand Paul, Representative Thomas Massie, former Representative and Governor of South Carolina Mark Sanford, and former Representative Ron Paul (who was a Republican prior to 1987 and again from 1996 to 2015, and a Libertarian from 1987 to 1996 and since 2015). Ron Paul ran for president once as a Libertarian and twice more recently as a Republican.

The libertarian conservative wing of the party had significant cross-over with the Tea Party movement.

During the 2024 United States elections, the Republican Party adopted pro-cryptocurrency policies, which were originally advocated by the libertarian wing of the party. As the Republican presidential nominee, Donald Trump addressed the 2024 Libertarian National Convention, pledging support for cryptocurrency, opposing central bank digital currency and expressing support for the commutation of Ross Ulbricht. Trump's 2024 campaign featured greater influence from technolibertarian elements, particularly Elon Musk, who was subsequently nominated to lead the Department of Government Efficiency (DOGE). 2024 Republican presidential candidate Vivek Ramaswamy, who was chosen to lead DOGE alongside Musk, has called for a synthesis between nationalism and libertarianism within the Republican Party, while opposing protectionist elements. Musk and Ramaswamy have clashed with elements within the right-wing populist faction over high-skilled legal immigration to the United States.

=== Moderates ===
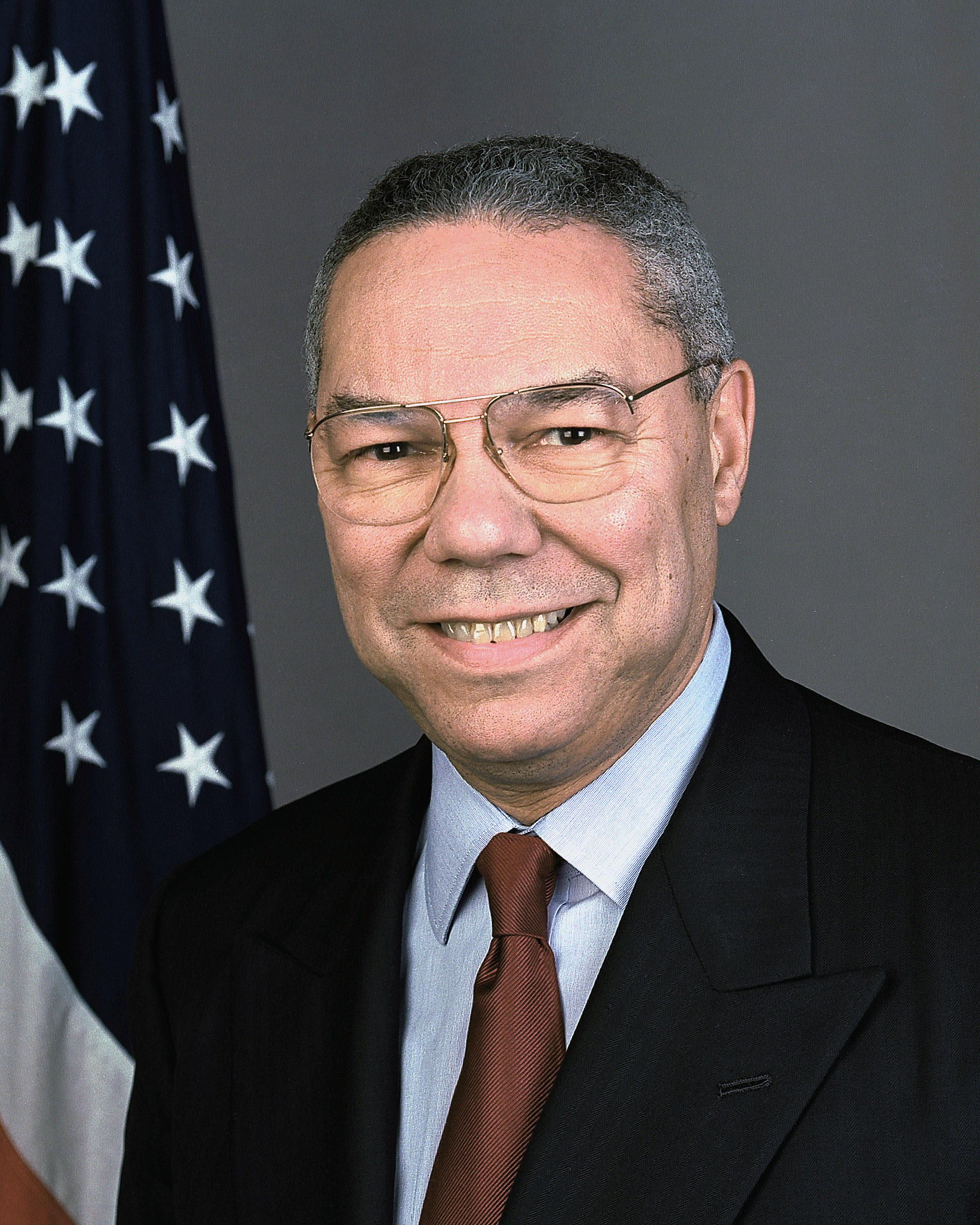
Secretary of State Colin Powell was one of the highest-ranking moderate Republicans in recent history, and left the party in January 2021 following the January 6 United States Capitol attack.

Moderate Republicans tend to be conservative-to-moderate on fiscal issues and moderate-to-liberal on social issues, and usually represent swing states or blue states. Moderate Republican voters are typically highly educated, affluent, socially moderate or liberal and often part of the Never Trump movement. Ideologically, such Republicans resemble the conservative liberals of Europe.

While they sometimes share the economic views of other Republicans (i.e. lower taxes, deregulation, and welfare reform), moderate Republicans differ in that some support affirmative action, LGBTQ rights and same-sex marriage, legal access to and even public funding for abortion, gun control laws, more environmental regulation and action on climate change, fewer restrictions on immigration and a path to citizenship for illegal immigrants, and embryonic stem cell research. In the 21st century, some former Republican moderates have switched to the Democratic Party.

Prominent 21st century moderate Republicans include Senators Lisa Murkowski of Alaska and Susan Collins of Maine and several current or former governors of northeastern states, such as Charlie Baker of Massachusetts, Larry Hogan of Maryland, and Phil Scott of Vermont. Another moderate Republican is incumbent governor of Nevada Joe Lombardo, who was previously the Sheriff of Clark County. Moderate Republican Representatives include Brian Fitzpatrick, Mike Lawler, and David Valadao.

One of the most high-ranking moderate Republicans in recent history was Colin Powell as Secretary of State in the first term of the George W. Bush administration (Powell left the Republican Party in January 2021 following the 2021 storming of the United States Capitol, and had endorsed every Democrat for president in the general election since 2008).

The Republican Governance Group is a caucus of moderate Republicans within the House of Representatives.

=== Neoconservatives ===
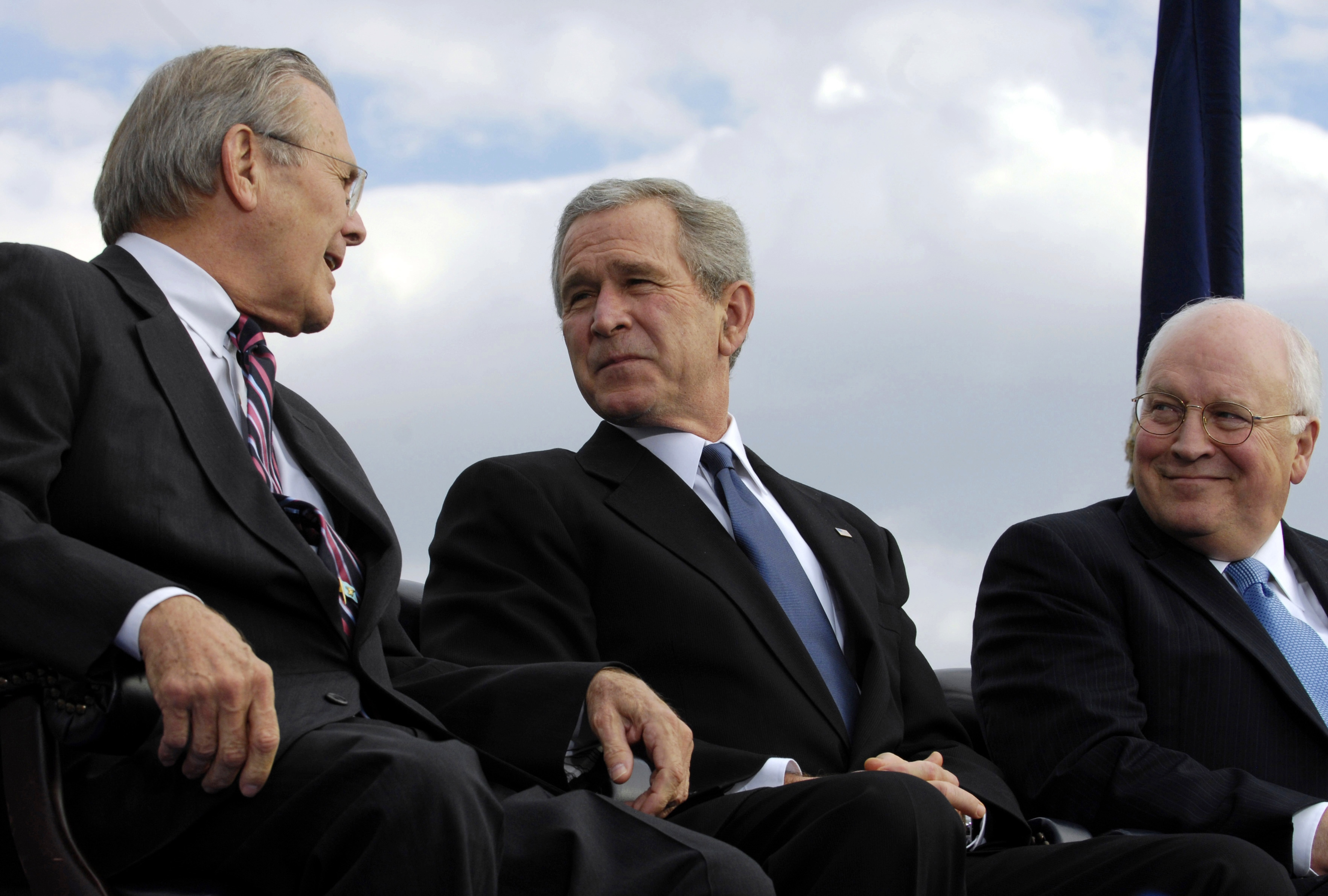
President George W. Bush (middle), Vice President Dick Cheney (right) and Secretary of Defense Donald Rumsfeld (left) were considered central figures of the war on terror following the September 11 attacks.

The Bush-Cheney administration marked the height of Neoconservatism during the 2000s.

Neoconservatives promote an interventionist foreign policy and democracy or American interests abroad. Neoconservatives have been credited with importing into the Republican Party a more active international policy. They are amenable to unilateral military action when they believe it serves a morally valid purpose (such as the spread of democracy or deterrence of human rights abuses abroad). They are grounded in a realist philosophy of "peace through strength." Many of its adherents became politically famous during the Republican presidential administrations of the late 20th century, and neoconservatism peaked in influence during the administration of George W. Bush and Dick Cheney during the 2000s, when they played a major role in promoting and planning the 2003 invasion of Iraq.

Prominent neoconservatives in the Bush-Cheney administration included John Bolton, Paul Wolfowitz, Elliott Abrams, Richard Perle, and Paul Bremer. During and after Donald Trump's presidency, neoconservatism has declined and non-interventionism and right-wing populism has grown among elected federal Republican officeholders. However, after Trump took office, some neoconservatives joined his first administration, such as John Bolton, Mike Pompeo, Elliott Abrams, and Nadia Schadlow. Later, in his second term, other neoconservatives integrated into the administration included Mike Waltz, John Ratcliffe, and Marco Rubio.

Neoconservatives' role remains key in foreign policy issues. The Hudson Institute has been described as neoconservative, whose researchers and foreign policy experts have played a key role in Republican administrations since the 2000s. Other organizations associated with this faction include the American Enterprise Institute, the Foundation for Defense of Democracies, the Henry Jackson Society and the Project for the New American Century.

=== Never Trump ===
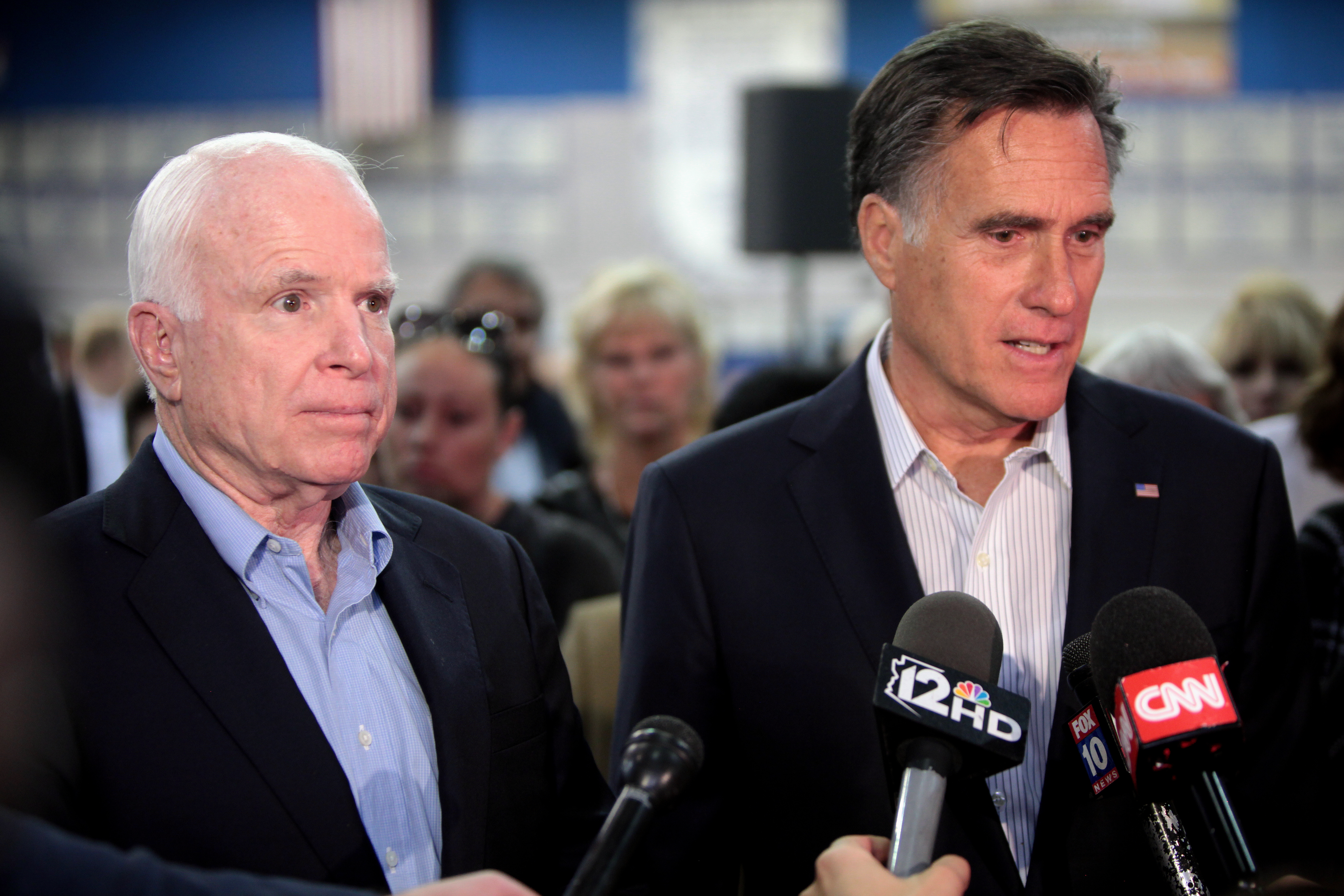
Senators John McCain and Mitt Romney, both former Republican presidential nominees, were two of the most prominent early voices within the Republican Party to publicly condemn Donald Trump and his ideology.

A divide has formed in the party between those who remain loyal to Donald Trump and those who oppose him. A recent survey concluded that the Republican Party was divided between pro-Trump (the "Trump Boosters," "Die-hard Trumpers," and "Infowars G.O.P." wings) and anti-Trump factions (the "Never Trump" and "Post-Trump G.O.P." wings). Senator John McCain was an early leading critic of Trumpism within the Republican Party, refusing to support the then-Republican presidential nominee in the 2016 presidential election.

Several critics of the Trump faction have faced various forms of retaliation. Representative Liz Cheney was removed from her position as Republican conference chair in the House of Representatives, which was perceived as retaliation for her criticism of Trump; in 2022, she was defeated by a pro-Trump primary challenger. Representative Adam Kinzinger decided to retire at the end of his term, while Murkowski faced a pro-Trump primary challenge in 2022 against Kelly Tshibaka whom she defeated. A primary challenge to Romney had been suggested by Jason Chaffetz, who has criticized his opponents within the Republican Party as "Trump haters". Romney chose not to run for re-election in 2024.

Representative Anthony Gonzalez, one of 10 House Republicans who voted to impeach Trump over the Capitol riot, called him "a cancer" while announcing his retirement. Former Governor of New Jersey Chris Christie, who was running against Trump in the 2024 Republican primaries, called him "a lonely, self-consumed, self-serving, mirror hog" in his presidential announcement. Indiana senator Todd Young is one of few elected Republican senators that did not support Trump's 2024 campaign.

Organizations associated with this faction include The Lincoln Project, Republican Accountability Project and Republicans for the Rule of Law.

=== Trumpists ===
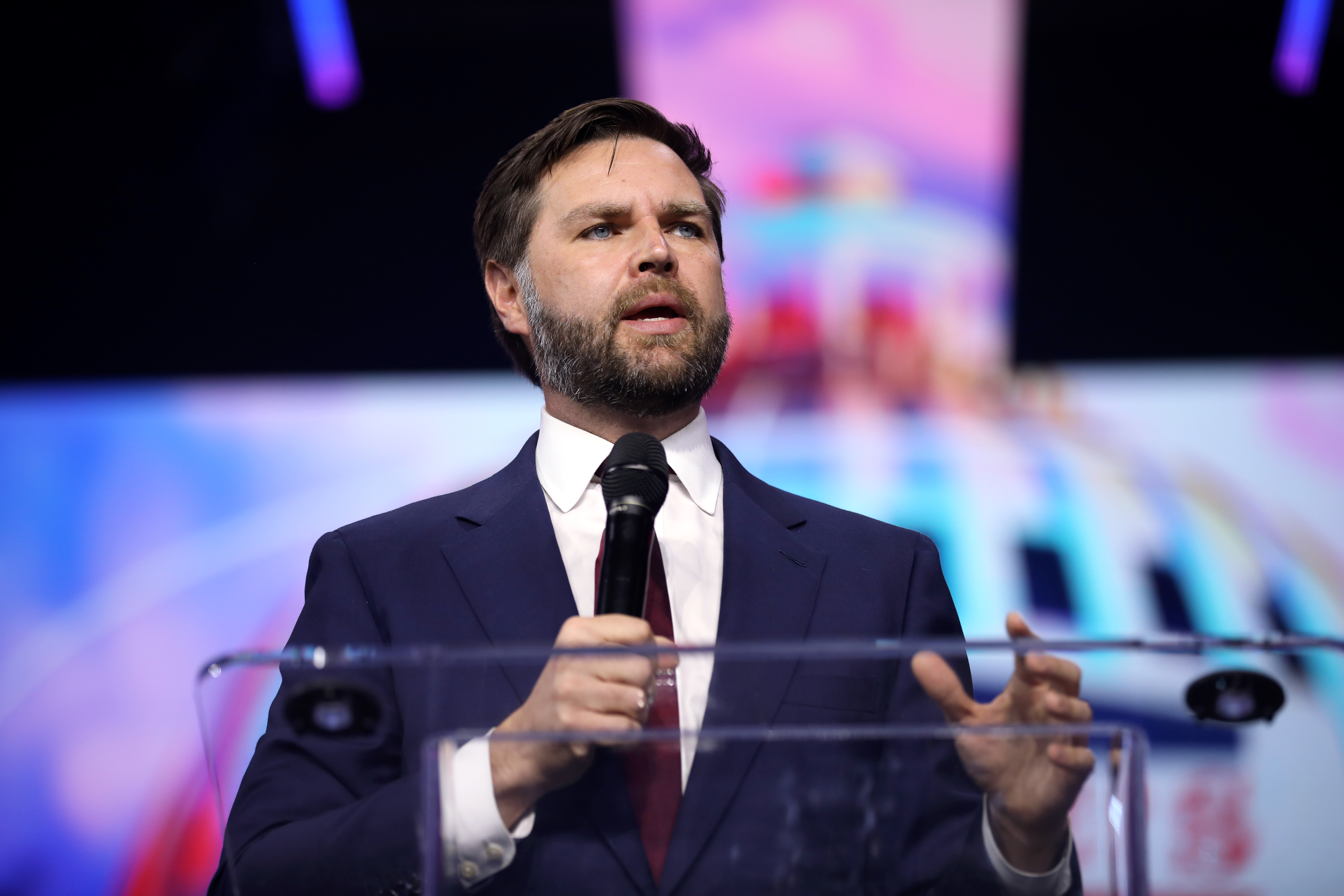
Vice President JD Vance, Donald Trump's vice presidential pick for his 2024 campaign. Although initially critical of Trump, Vance became a staunch advocate of Trumpism later into Trump's first term and by 2021, was described as a right-wing populist.

Sometimes referred to as the Make America Great Again (MAGA) movement, Trumpism is a political movement closely associated with Donald Trump and his base. It has been described as consisting of a range of right-wing ideologies including but not limited to right-wing populism, national conservatism, neo-nationalism, fascism, neo-fascism, and proto-fascism. Supporters of Donald Trump are often referred to as "Trumpists" in political and academic contexts. The term "Trumper" is also used, particularly in informal or online discourse, and is often employed with a derogatory connotation. Trumpists have been described by some commentators, including Joseph Lowndes, James A. Gardner, and Guy-Uriel Charles, as the American political variant of the far-right. Trumpists are the dominant faction in the Republican Party as of 2025.

Rachel Kleinfeld, senior fellow at the Carnegie Endowment for International Peace, characterizes Trumpism as an authoritarian, antidemocratic movement which has successfully weaponized cultural issues, and that cultivates a narrative placing white people, Christians, and men at the top of a status hierarchy as its response to the so-called "Great Replacement" theory, a claim that minorities, immigrants, and women, enabled by Democrats, Jews, and elites, are displacing white people, Christians, and men from their "rightful" positions in American society. In international relations, Trumpists support U.S. aid to Israel but not to Ukraine, are generally supportive towards Russia, yet claim to favor an isolationist "America First" foreign policy agenda. They generally reject compromise within the party and with Democrats, and are willing to oust fellow Republican office holders they deem to be too moderate. Compared to other Republicans, the Trumpist faction is more likely to be immigration restrictionists, and to be against free trade, neoconservatism, and environmental protection laws.

The Republican Party's Trumpist and far-right movements emerged in occurrence with a global increase in such movements in the 2010s and 2020s, coupled with entrenchment and increased partisanship within the party since 2010, fueled by the rise of the Tea Party movement which has also been described as far-right. The election of Trump in 2016 split the party into Trumpist and Never Trump factions.

When conservative columnist George Will advised voters of all ideologies to vote for Democratic candidates in the Senate and House elections of November 2018, political writer Dan McLaughlin at the National Review responded that doing so would make the Trumpist faction even more powerful within the Republican party. Anticipating Trump's defeat in the U.S. presidential election held on November 3, 2020, Peter Feaver wrote in Foreign Policy magazine: "With victory having been so close, the Trumpist faction in the party will be empowered and in no mood to compromise or reform." A poll conducted in February 2021 indicated that a plurality of Republicans (46% versus 27%) would leave the Republican Party to join a new party if Trump chose to create it. Nick Beauchamp, assistant professor of political science at Northeastern University, says he sees the country as divided into four parties, with two factions representing each of the Democratic and Republican parties: "For the GOP, there's the Trump faction—which is the larger group—and the non-Trump faction".

Lilliana Mason, associate professor of political science at Johns Hopkins University, states that Donald Trump solidified the trend among Southern white conservative Democrats since the 1960s of leaving the Democratic Party and joining the Republican Party: "Trump basically worked as a lightning rod to finalize that process of creating the Republican Party as a single entity for defending the high status of white, Christian, rural Americans. It's not a huge percentage of Americans that holds these beliefs, and it's not even the entire Republican Party; it's just about half of it. But the party itself is controlled by this intolerant, very strongly pro-Trump faction."

Julia Azari, an associate professor of political science at Marquette University, noted that not all Trumpist Republicans are public supporters of Donald Trump, and that some Republicans endorse Trump policies while distancing themselves from Trump as a person.

In a speech he gave on November 2, 2022, at Washington's Union Station near the U.S. Capitol, President Biden asserted that "the pro-Trump faction" of the Republican Party is trying to undermine the U.S. electoral system and suppress voting rights.

== Congressional caucuses ==
Caucus	Republican Main Street Caucus	Republican Governance Group	Republican Study Committee	Freedom Caucus
Political position	Center to center-right	Center-right to right-wing	Right-wing	Right-wing to far-right
2020	0 / 213	45 / 213	157 / 213	45 / 213
2022	67 / 222	42 / 222	173 / 222	33 / 222
2024	73 / 220	46 / 220	188 / 220	33 / 220

== Historical factions ==
=== Black-and-tan faction ===
The black-and-tan faction was an American biracial faction in the Republican Party in the Southern United States from the 1870s to the 1960s. It replaced the Negro Republican Party faction's name after the 1890s.

Southern Republicans were divided into two factions: the lily-white faction, which was practically all-white, and the biracial black-and-tan faction. The former was strongest in heavily white counties. The final victory of its opponent, the lily-white faction, came in 1964. The disintegration of their influence in the Republican Party came about with the replacement of Old Right-oriented politics amidst the rise of the New Right under Eisenhower Republicanism.

=== Lily-white movement ===
Norris Wright Cuney, the first African-American chairman of the Republican Party of Texas

The Lily-White Movement was an anti-Black political movement within the Republican Party in the United States in the late 19th and early 20th centuries. It was a response to the political and socioeconomic gains made by African Americans following the Civil War and the Thirteenth Amendment to the Constitution, which eliminated slavery and involuntary servitude ("except as punishment for a crime").

During Reconstruction, Black leaders in the South gained influence in the Republican Party by organizing Black people as an important voting bloc via Union Leagues and the biracial Black-and-tan faction of the Republicans. Conservative Whites attempted to eliminate this influence and recover White voters who had defected to the Democratic Party. The Lily-White Movement proved successful throughout the South and was a key factor in the growth of the Republican Party in the region.

=== Negro Republican Party ===
The Negro Republican Party was one name used, in the period before the end of the civil rights movement, for a branch of the Republican Party in the Southern United States, particularly Kentucky, that was predominantly made up of Black Americans.

=== Stalwarts ===
The Stalwarts were a traditionalist faction that existed from the 1860s through the 1880s. They represented "traditional" Republicans who favored machine politics and opposed the civil service reforms of Rutherford B. Hayes and the more progressive Half-Breeds. They declined following the elections of Hayes and James A. Garfield. After Garfield's assassination by Charles J. Guiteau, his Stalwart Vice President Chester A. Arthur assumed the presidency. However, rather than pursuing Stalwart goals he took up the reformist cause, which curbed the faction's influence.

=== Half-Breeds ===
The Half-Breeds were a reformist faction of the 1870s and 1880s. The name, which originated with rivals claiming they were only "half" Republicans, came to encompass a wide array of figures who did not all get along with each other. Generally speaking, politicians labeled Half-Breeds were moderates or progressives who opposed the machine politics of the Stalwarts and advanced civil service reforms.

=== Radical Republicans ===
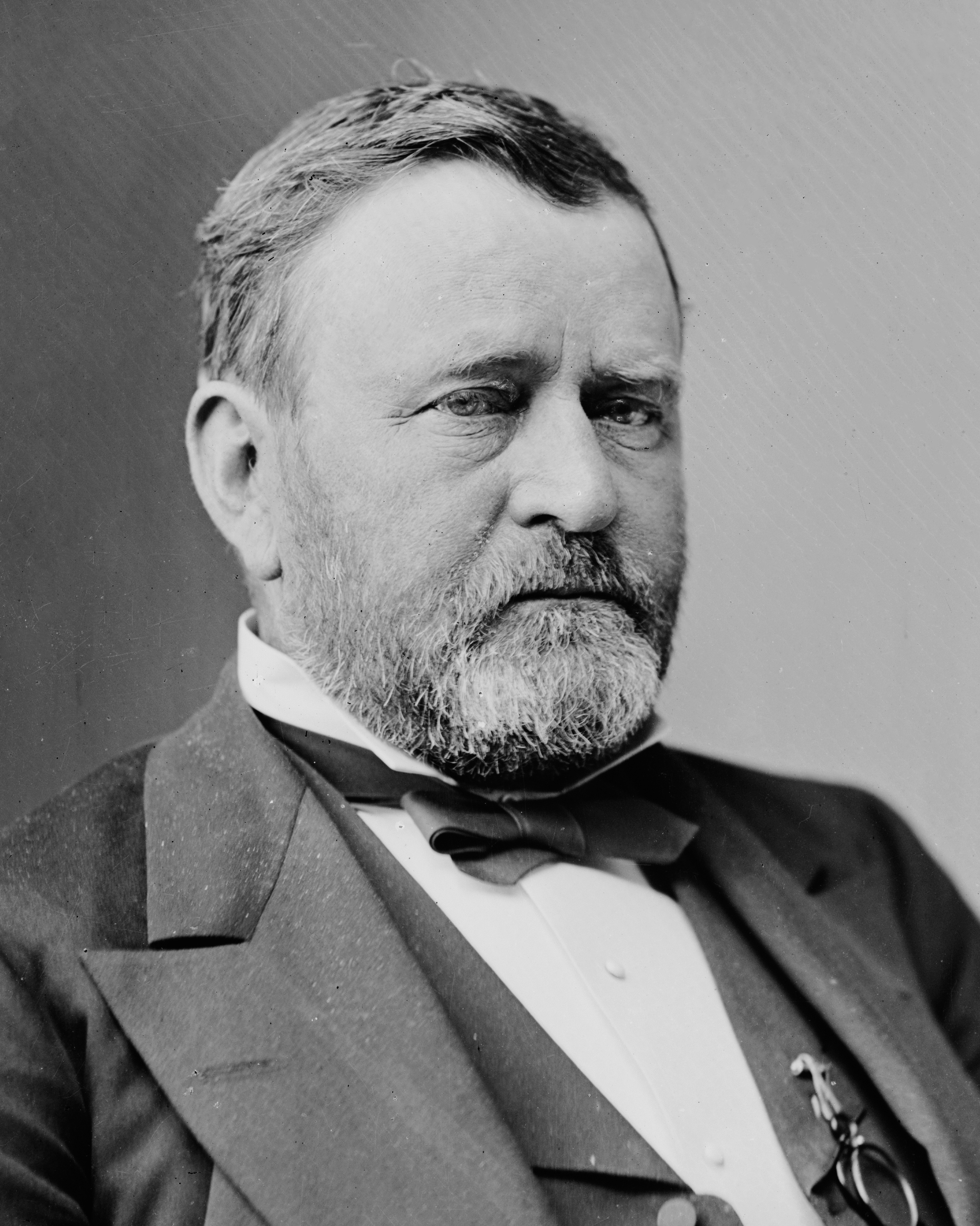
President Ulysses S. Grant worked closely with Radical Republicans to protect African Americans.

The Radical Republicans were a major factor of the party from its inception in 1854 until the end of the Reconstruction Era in 1877. The Radicals strongly opposed slavery, were hard-line abolitionists, and later advocated equal rights for the freedmen and women. They were often at odds with the moderate and conservative factions of the party. During the American Civil War, Radical Republicans pressed for abolition as a major war aim and they opposed the moderate Reconstruction plans of Abraham Lincoln as too lenient on the Confederates. After the war's end and Lincoln's assassination, the Radicals clashed with Andrew Johnson over Reconstruction policy.

After winning major victories in the 1866 congressional elections, the Radicals took over Reconstruction, pushing through new legislation protecting the civil rights of African Americans. John C. Frémont of Michigan, the party's first nominee for president in 1856, was a Radical Republican. Upset with Lincoln's politics, the faction split from the Republican Party to form the short-lived Radical Democratic Party in 1864 and again nominated Frémont for president. They supported Ulysses S. Grant for president in 1868 and 1872, who worked closely with them to protect African Americans during Reconstruction. As Southern Democrats retook control in the South and enthusiasm for continued Reconstruction declined in the North, their influence within the GOP waned.

=== Progressive Republicans ===
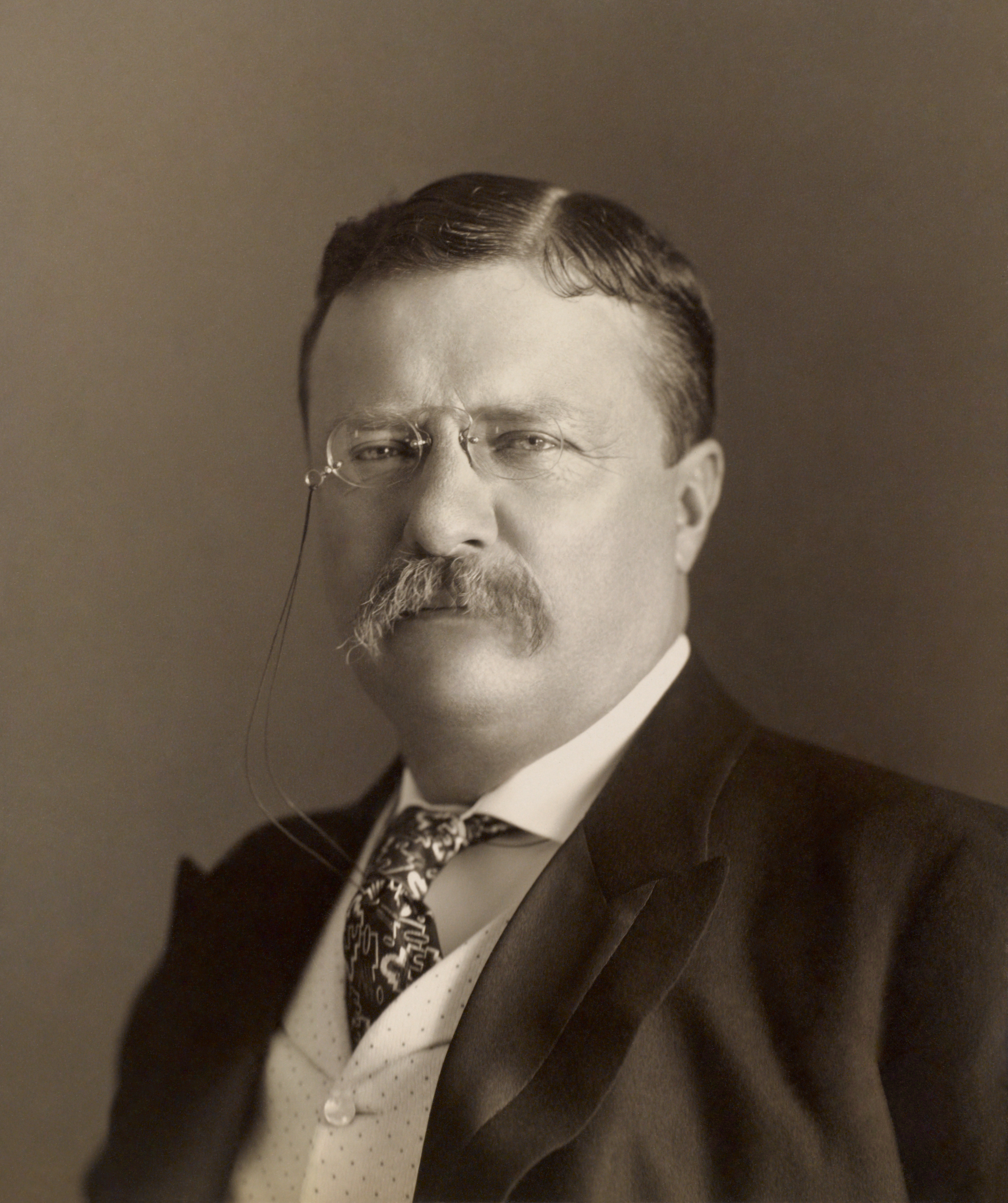
President Theodore Roosevelt, a leader of the Progressive Era who later joined the short-lived Bull Moose Party

Historically, the Republican Party included a progressive wing that advocated using government to improve the problems of modern society. Theodore Roosevelt, an early leader of the progressive movement, advanced a "Square Deal" domestic program as president (1901–09) that was built on the goals of controlling corporations, protecting consumers, and conserving natural resources. After splitting with his successor, William Howard Taft, in the aftermath of the Pinchot–Ballinger controversy, Roosevelt sought to block Taft's re-election, first by challenging him for the 1912 Republican presidential nomination, and then when that failed, by entering the 1912 presidential contest as a third party candidate, running on the Progressive ticket. He succeeded in depriving Taft of a second term, but came in second behind Democrat Woodrow Wilson.

After Roosevelt's 1912 defeat, the progressive wing of the party went into decline. Progressive Republicans in the U.S. House of Representatives held a "last stand" protest in December 1923, at the start of the 68th Congress, when they refused to support the Republican Conference nominee for Speaker of the House, Frederick H. Gillett, voting instead for two other candidates. After eight ballots spanning two days, they agreed to support Gillett in exchange for a seat on the House Rules Committee and pledges that subsequent rules changes would be considered. On the ninth ballot, Gillett received 215 votes, a majority of the 414 votes cast, to win the election.

In addition to Theodore Roosevelt, leading early progressive Republicans included Robert M. La Follette, Charles Evans Hughes, Hiram Johnson, William Borah, George W. Norris, William Allen White, Victor Murdock, Clyde M. Reed and Fiorello La Guardia.

=== Old Guard ===
The Old Guard was the conservative faction of the Republican Party between 1945 and 1964. They coalesced around their opposition to the shifts in traditional economic and foreign policy under the presidency of Franklin D. Roosevelt. This opposition was most noticeably directed to the New Deal, which was variously derided by Old Guard lawmakers as communist, socialist, or overreaching, seeing its programs as unwanted, unconstitutional, unwise, and politically unprofitable.

To counter the New Deal, Republicans of the Old Guard espoused Americanism, which entailed a strict construction of the Constitution, fiscal responsibility, and state and local over federal regulation. Politically, they opposed federal regulation of state, local, or business interests. They viewed "big government" as a threat to liberty, which they interpreted as economic freedom, which they saw as critical to incentivizing individuals to improve their material welfare and develop the pioneer virtues of individualism and self-reliance. The Old Guard also espoused a unilateralist foreign policy, eschewing alliances that entailed advance military commitments while "go[ing] it alone" in foreign engagements. This also entailed economic self-sufficiency, prioritizing American financial interests, and thus partially informed the Old Guard's support for tariffs on imports and opposition to foreign aid.

While sharing the above overarching goals, figures affiliated with this movement varied in their policy stances. These included Bruce Fairchild Barton, John W. Bricker, Styles Bridges, Joseph McCarthy, Everett Dirksen, Walter Judd, and Robert A. Taft.

=== Birchers ===
In the 1964 Republican primaries, the John Birch Society (JBS) helped to secure Barry Goldwater's Republican presidential nomination, defeating Nelson Rockefeller. Original members believed the Republican party was in danger of becoming too moderate. Members of the John Birch Society, known as Birchers, were associated with the radical right, anti-communism, and ultraconservatism. The John Birch Society was founded in 1958 by businessman Robert W. Welch Jr., and is controversial for its promotion of conspiracy theories.

=== Rockefeller Republicans ===
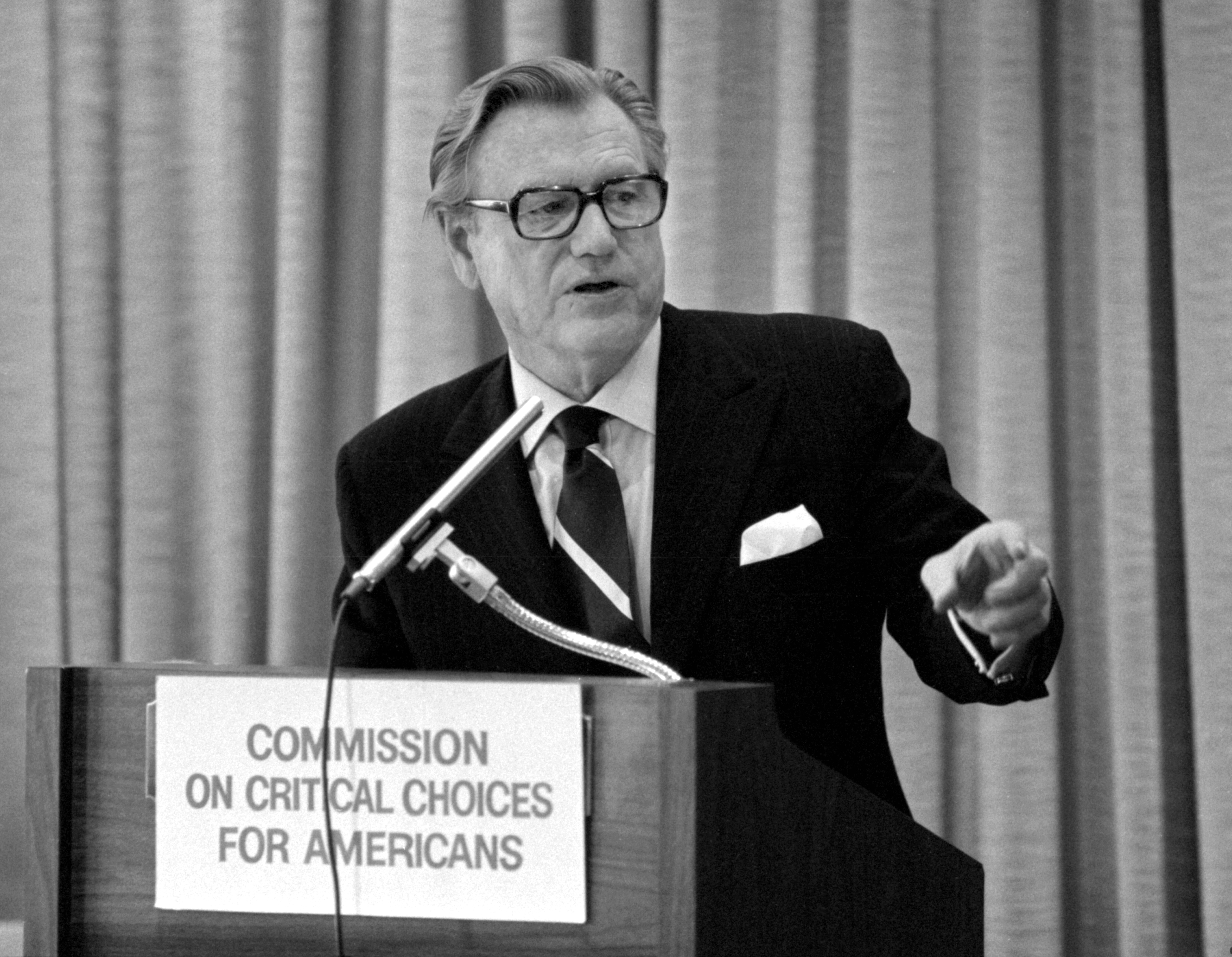
Vice President Nelson Rockefeller, namesake of the Rockefeller Republicans

Moderate or liberal Republicans in the 20th century, particularly those from the Northeast and West Coast, were referred to as "The Eastern Establishment" or "Rockefeller Republicans", after Nelson Rockefeller, Vice President during the Gerald Ford administration.

With their power decreasing in the final decades of the 20th century, many Rockefeller-style Republicans were replaced by conservative and moderate Democrats, such as those from the Blue Dog or New Democrat coalitions. Massachusetts Republican Elliot Richardson (who served in several cabinet positions during the Richard Nixon administration) and writer and academic Michael Lind argued that the liberalism of Democratic President Bill Clinton and the rest of the New Democrat movement were in many ways to the right of Dwight Eisenhower, Rockefeller, and John Lindsay, Republican Congressman and Mayor of New York City in the late 1960s.

=== Reagan coalition ===
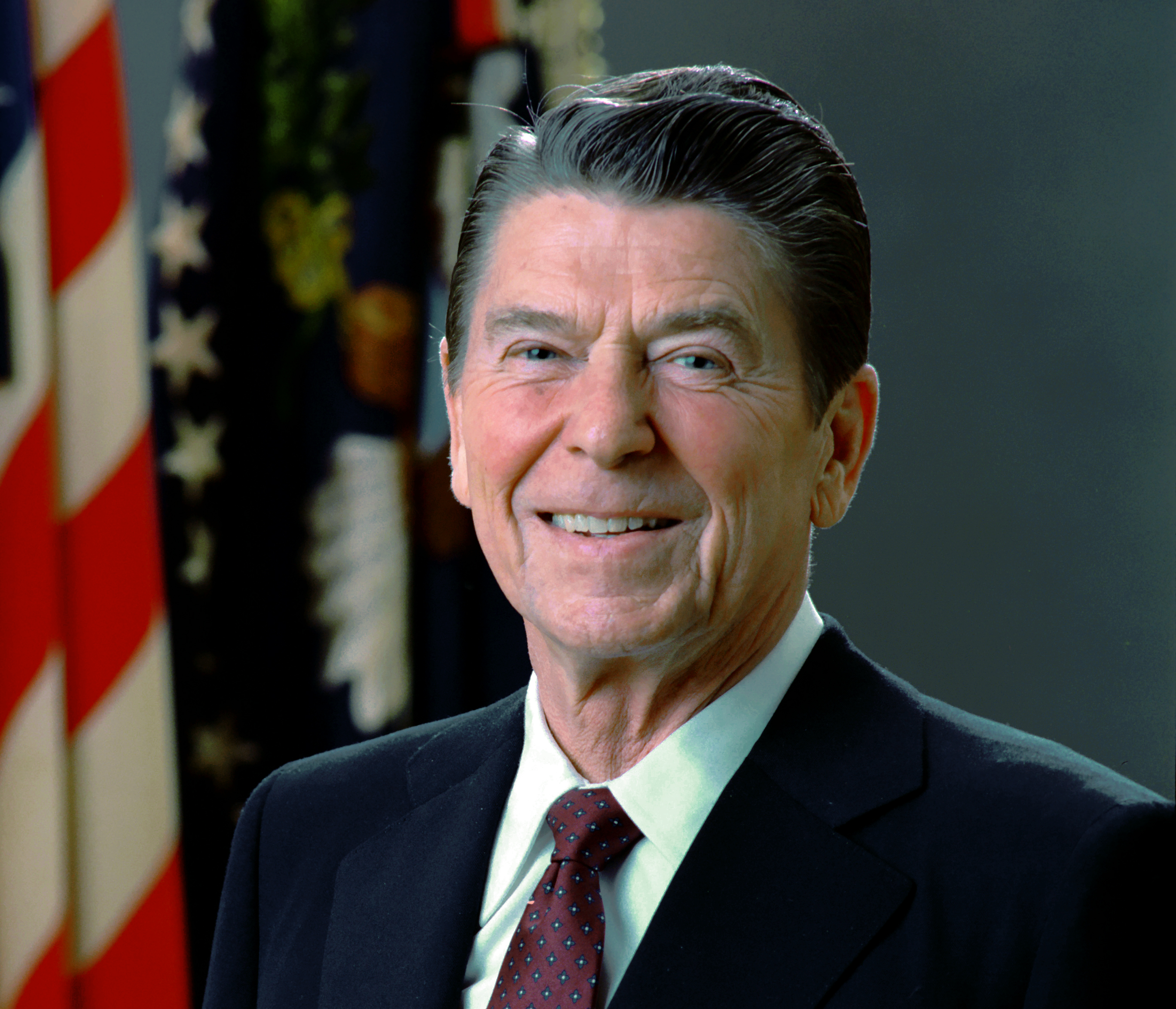
President Ronald Reagan, namesake of the Reagan coalition

According to historian George H. Nash, the Reagan coalition in the Republican Party, which centered around Ronald Reagan and his administration throughout all of the 1980s (continuing in the late 1980s with the George H. W. Bush administration), originally consisted of five factions: the libertarians, the traditionalists, the anti-communists, the neoconservatives, and the religious right (which consisted of Protestants, Catholics, and some Jewish Republicans).

=== Tea Party movement ===
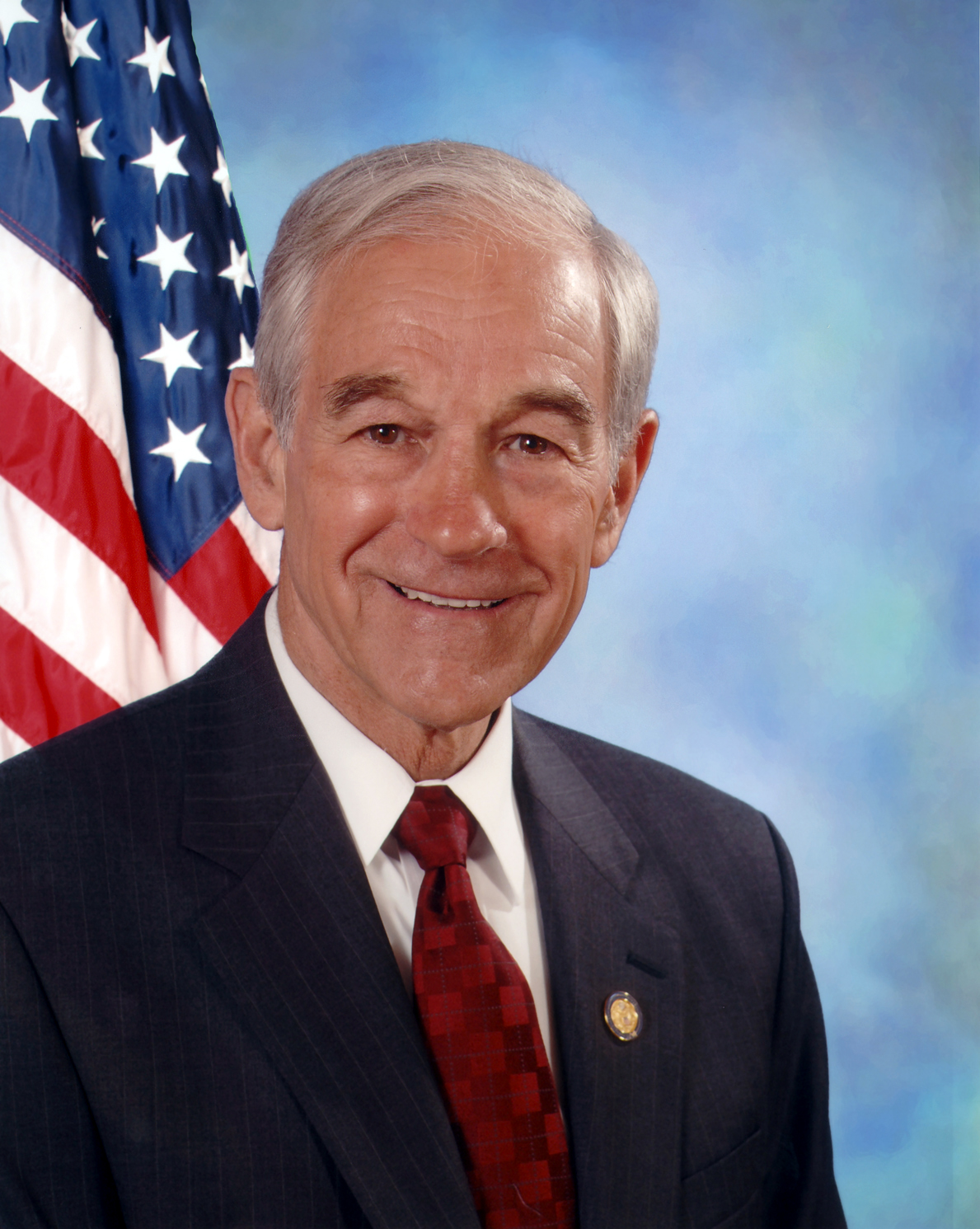
Former Representative Ron Paul, known as the "intellectual godfather" of the Tea Party movement

The Tea Party movement was an American fiscally conservative political movement within the Republican Party that began in 2009 following the election of Barack Obama as President of the United States. Members of the movement have called for lower taxes, and for a reduction of the national debt of the United States and federal budget deficit through decreased government spending. The movement supports small-government principles and opposes government-sponsored universal healthcare. It has been described as a popular constitutional movement.

On matters of foreign policy, the movement largely supports avoiding being drawn into unnecessary conflicts and opposes "liberal internationalism". Its name refers to the Boston Tea Party of December 16, 1773, a watershed event in the launch of the American Revolution. By 2016, Politico said that the modern Tea Party movement was "pretty much dead now"; however, the article noted that it seemed to die in part because some of its ideas had been "co-opted" by the mainstream Republican Party.

Politicians associated with the Tea Party include former Representatives Ron Paul, Michele Bachmann and Allen West, Senators Ted Cruz, Mike Lee, Rand Paul and Tim Scott, former Senator Jim DeMint, former acting White House Chief of Staff Mick Mulvaney, and 2008 Republican vice presidential nominee and former Alaska Governor Sarah Palin. Although there has never been any one clear founder or leader of the movement, Palin scored highest in a 2010 Washington Post poll asking Tea Party organizers "which national figure best represents your groups?". Ron Paul was described in a 2011 Atlantic article as its "intellectual godfather". Both Paul and Palin, although ideologically different in many ways, had a major influence on the emergence of the movement due to their separate 2008 presidential primary and vice presidential general election runs respectively.

Several political organizations were created in response to the movement's growing popularity in the late 2000s and into the early 2010s, including the Tea Party Patriots, Tea Party Express and Tea Party Caucus.

== See also ==
- Factions in the Democratic Party (United States)
- Factions in the Libertarian Party (United States)
