= Dahms =

Dahms is a surname. Notable people with the surname include:

- Gail Dahms (born 1957), former Canadian actress and singer
- Gary Dahms (born 1947), American politician from Minnesota
- Harry Dahms, American professor
- Matthias Dahms (born 1961), German vibraphone and marimba soloist, percussionist, and composer
- Tom Dahms (1927–1988), American football player and coach

== See also ==
- Nicole, Erica and Jaclyn Dahm
- Dahm (disambiguation)
