= Mads Dahm =

Norwegian footballer (born 1988)

Personal information
- Date of birth: 21 October 1988 (age 38)
- Place of birth: Oslo, Norway
- Height: 1.94 m (6 ft 4 1/2 in)
- Position: Defender

Team information
- Current team: Lyn
- Number: 21

Youth career
- Lyn

Senior career*
Years	Team	Apps	(Gls)
2006–2010	Lyn	41	(0)
2010	Lillestrøm	7	(0)
2011–	Lyn	39	(7)
- * Club domestic league appearances and goals as of 12 July 2013

Mads Dahm (born 21 October 1988), is a Norwegian footballer playing for Lyn in the Norwegian Third Division. He has played two games for Norway national under-21 football team. He is the younger brother of former Lyn player Fredrik Dahm. In August 2010, he signed for Lillestrøm, following Lyn's bankruptcy. In February, he decided to go back and help his old club Lyn back to the top.

== Career statistics ==
Season	Club	Division	League		Cup		Total	
Season	Club	Division	Apps	Goals	Apps	Goals	Apps	Goals
2006	Lyn	Eliteserien	0	0	1	0	1	0
2007	Lyn	Eliteserien	9	0	1	0	10	0
2008	Lyn	Eliteserien	12	0	3	1	15	1
2009	Lyn	Eliteserien	16	0	3	0	19	0
2010	Lyn	1. divisjon	4	0	1	0	5	0
2010	Lillestrøm	Eliteserien	7	0	0	0	7	0
2011	Lyn	4. divisjon	20	4	0	0	20	4
2012	Lyn	3. divisjon	8	3	1	0	9	3
2013	Lyn	2. divisjon	11	0	2	0	13	0
Career Total			87	7	12	1	99	8
