= Harry F. Dahms =

American sociology professor

Harry F. Dahms

Harry F. Dahms is a professor of sociology and director of the Center for Social Theory at the University of Tennessee - Knoxville. He is the editor of Current Perspectives in Social Theory, and director of the International Social Theory Consortium (ISTC). Dahms also is an associate editor of Basic Income Studies and Soundings. An Interdisciplinary Journal, and was a founding member of the editorial boards of The Newfound Press (an imprint of the University of Tennessee Libraries), as well as of Anthem Studies in the Political Sociology of Democracy, on whose board he continues to be. Since 2022, he has been a member of the AI Tennessee Initiative task force.

Dahms' primary research and teaching areas are theoretical sociology (classical and contemporary theory; social, sociological, and critical theory), planetary sociology, globalization, political economy, social inequality, sociology of film (with emphasis on the science-fiction genre), and artificial intelligence.

== Education and career ==
Dahms obtained his master's degree in sociology, economics, and statistics in 1986 from the University of Konstanz, Germany, where he worked with Ralf Dahrendorf as research and teaching assistant and attended several seminars by Albrecht Wellmer. Dahms obtained his PhD in sociology in 1993 at The New School for Social Research in New York; the title of his dissertation was "The Entrepreneur in Western Capitalism: Schumpeter's Theory of Economic Development." Arthur J. Vidich was Dahms' dissertation supervisor, and Andrew Arato and José Casanova were committee members. Dahms also enrolled in seminars taught by Richard Bernstein, Robert Heilbroner, Agnes Heller, Eric Hobsbawm, Guy Oakes, and Claus Offe.

Dahms started teaching at Florida State University in Tallahassee in fall 1993 and has been at the University of Tennessee - Knoxville since fall 2004. He was a visiting professor affiliated with the Center of European and North America Studies at the University of Göttingen, Germany (October 1999 until December 2000) and with the Department of Sociology at the University of Innsbruck, Austria (summer semester 2011 and 2012), where he also taught regular compact seminars between 2010 and 2019).

== Work ==
Dahms' research and teaching pertains to the tensions in the modern age between economic change, on the one hand, and politics, culture and society, on the other. Interpreting the contributions of Marx and Weber, in particular, as foundations for a dynamic theory of modern society, he starts out from the proposition that the contradictions and paradoxes of modern society must be located within the field of tensions between “globalization” and planetary sociology, at the intersection between identity structure and social structure.

The spectrum of his theoretical reference points ranges from the critical theory of the Frankfurt School at one end - especially Theodor W. Adorno and Jürgen Habermas - to Joseph Schumpeter's social theory of capitalism, at the other, but also includes many other social theorists, philosophers, and social scientists, including Georg Wilhelm Friedrich Hegel, Max Weber, Eduard Heimann, Talcott Parsons, Darko Suvin, Lawrence Hazelrigg, Moishe Postone, and Amy Allen. In modern society, a particular kind of social order fused with social processes tied to a new economic system combined with ongoing industrialization into an inherently irreconcilable set of force-fields. These force-fields are fraught with many different types of friction that maintains social stability by devising mechanisms designed to contain the destructive power of proliferating contradictions. As a consequence, continually deepening contradictions are viewed by individuals as entirely "normal" features of modern social life. The result is a widening gap between the categories social scientists employ to meaningfully interpret present conditions, and the categories that would have to be developed and deployed to maintain the possibility of knowledge — socially, culturally, and politically.

== Awards ==
- Senior-Level Excellence in Teaching Award, 2021, College of Arts & Sciences, University of Tennessee.
- Albert Salomon Dissertation Award, The New School, 1993.

== Selected works ==
- "Social Theory's Burden: From Heteronomy to Vitacide (or, How Classical Critical Theory Predicted Proliferating Rackets, Authoritarian Personalities, and Administered Worlds in the Twenty-First Century)," in Society in Flux: Two Centuries of Social Theory (Current Perspectives in Social Theory, vol. 37; Bingley, UK: Emerald, 2022), ed. by Harry F. Dahms.
- “Critical Theory, Sociology, and Science-Fiction Films: Love, Radical Transformation and the Socio-Logic of Capital,” in Daniel Krier and Mark Worrell (eds.), Capital in the Mirror: Critical Social Theory and the Aesthetic Dimension (Albany, NY: SUNY Press; 2020): 231–301.
- “Adorno’s Critique of the New Right-Wing Extremism: How (Not) to Face the Past, Present, and Future,” disClosure: a journal of social theory, 29(1), 129-179.
- Ecologically Unequal Exchange Environmental Injustice in Comparative and Historical Perspective: Environmental Injustice in Comparative and Historical Perspective, co-edited with R. Scott Frey and Paul K. Gellert (Palgrave, 2019)
- The Vitality of Critical Theory. Emerald, 2011.
- Nature, Knowledge, and Negation (ed.). Current Perspectives in Social Theory, 26, Emerald, 2009.
- No Social Science Without Critical Theory (ed.). Current Perspectives in Social Theory, 25, Emerald, 2008.
- Globalization Between the Cold War and Neo-Imperialism (Special Volume Editor). Current Perspectives in Social Theory, 24, Elsevier/JAI, 2006.
- Transformations of Capitalism: Economy, Society and the State in Modern Times (Editor). London: Palgrave, and New York: NYU Press, 2000.
