= Fredrik Dahm =

Norwegian footballer (born 1982)

Personal information
- Full name: Fredrik Dahm
- Date of birth: 29 October 1982 (age 44)
- Height: 1.92 m (6 ft 3 1/2 in)
- Position: Striker

Team information
- Current team: Korsvoll
- Number: 22

Youth career
- Lyn

Senior career*
Years	Team	Apps	(Gls)
2000–2002	Lyn	4	(1)
2003–2005	Lørenskog		
2006	Sparta Sarpsborg	29	(8)
2007–2008	Drøbak/Frogn		
2009	Lyn	16	(2)
2012–	Korsvoll		
- * Club domestic league appearances and goals as of 12 July 2013

Fredrik Dahm (born 29 October 1982) is a Norwegian footballer who currently plays for Korsvoll.

Dahm originally came from Lyn's youth department. He played four games in 2000, but was then injured. Ahead of the 2003 season he left Lyn for Lørenskog IF. Ahead of the 2006 season he joined Sparta Sarpsborg. In 2007 and 2008 he played for Drøbak/Frogn IL, before he returned to Lyn before the Norwegian Premier League 2009 season.

He is the older brother of Mads Dahm who has also played for Lyn.
