= Adolf Dahm-Petersen =

Norwegian voice specialist and singing teacher

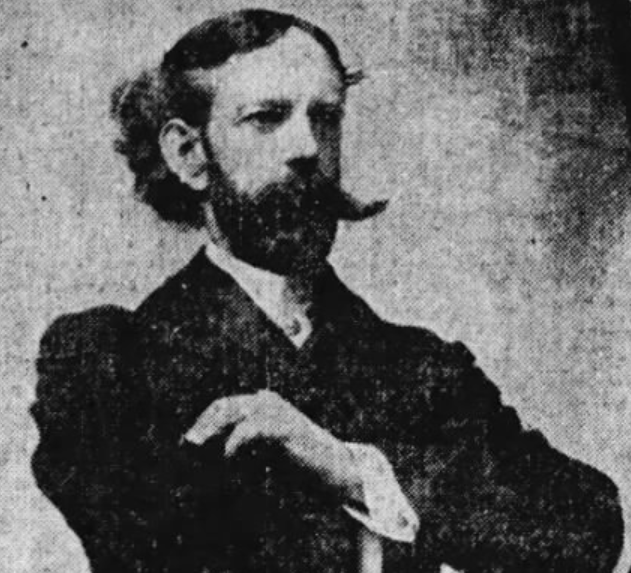
- Born: 2 January 1856; Kristiania, Norway
- Died: 29 January 1922 (aged 66); Los Angeles, California, USA
- Education: Norwegian Military Academy
- Occupation: Voice teacher
- Employers: Ithaca College; Cornell University

Adolf Dahm-Petersen (2 January 1856 – 29 January 1922) was a Norwegian voice specialist and singing teacher.

Adolf Dahm-Petersen, son of Johan Frode Petersen (1819–1913) and Helena Thalia P. née Dahm (1828–1862), was born in Kristiania, now Oslo. After attending gymnasium and the Royal Military Academy in Norway, he studied at the universities in Aachen and Karlsruhe, Germany. Furthermore, he studied piano with Hanna Bergwitz-Goffeng, music theory with Johan Svendsen, and voice with Emilio Belari. On 11 September 1892 he married Susie Kreuder. His debut in concert was in Carnegie Hall in 1894, after which he gave concerts in the US, Norway and Denmark. He also appeared as a soloist with the Oratorio Society of New York, Sousa's band and the Damrosch Opera Company under the direction of Walter Damrosch. Dahm-Petersen was director of several choral organizations, and was a vocal instructor at the Ithaca Conservatory of Music and Cornell University.

His repertoire included more than a thousand songs and his students included Oliver Hardy.

He died in Los Angeles in 1922.
