= Sociology of film =

Field of study

The sociology of film deals with the sociological analysis of film. According to a university class in it, the field includes "Contemporary cinema as a culture clue to social change; an introduction to the social forces involved in film-making in the United States and other cultures; the influence of films on mass and select audiences." According to another university course, it covers "social aspects causes and consequences of the production, distribution, content, form and reception of film."

The New York Times said, "One problem, though, is that if the audience is the measure all things, then art becomes a reflection of sociology and dissecting audience tastes becomes the art."

== Bibliography ==
- Diken, Bulent & Carsten Bagge Laustsen. Sociology Through the Projector. Routledge, 2007.
- Huaco, George. Sociology of film art. Basic Books, 1965.
  - Review, American Journal of Sociology 72"314 (1966)
- Mayer, J. P.: Sociology of Film: Studies and Documents. Faber & Faber, 1946. Full text on Internet Archive
- Sutherland, Jean-Anne, and Katheryn Feltey. Cinematic Sociology : Social Life in Film. 2nd ed. SAGE Publishing, 2013.
- Tudor, Anthony. Image and Influence : Studies in the Sociology of Film. Allen & Unwin, 1974.
  - Review, Literature/Film Quarterly" 5:84 (1978)
