= Matthias Dahms =

German musician

Matthias Dahms 2006

Matthias Dahms (born October 17, 1961) is a German virtuoso vibraphone and marimba soloist, percussionist and composer. He has been a percussion soloist ever since 1990, giving concerts and drum courses and mallet-instrument classes in Europe as well as overseas.

== Biography ==
Dahms was born in Berlin. His father owned a car sales company and was an amateur jazz pianist, while his mother was an artist.

Dahms received his university education at the Staatliche Hochschule für Musik at Karlsruhe, Germany, and later an advanced diploma as Master of Arts from the University of the Arts Berlin. During his university years he additionally had private lessons with David Friedman (USA) and attended workshops with e.g. Keiko Abe, Billy Hart, Dave Weckl, Billy Cobham, Ed Thigpen, David Liebman/Richard Beirach, and Reinhard Flatischler.

Dahms’ playing, which is famous for its beautiful tone and atmosphere, besides accurate tempo and rhythm, has been remarked as: “Stars and angels - extraordinary sense for moods and colors“, "Rhythmical percussionism together with classical dream, Matthias Dahms created a music that conquers all". In 1999 he was chosen to become part of the 'Who-Is-Who'

== Career ==
In the course of his career Dahms had many TV/radio performances, recordings and concert tours as a soloist, as an orchestra musician (i.e. with “The New Chamber Orchestra Berlin” conducted by Christoph Hagel), as a member of various ensembles (i.e. “Forum Neue Musik Berlin”, "Berlin Improvising Composers Ensemble/B.I.C.E.", “Mallets in Company”) and performed as a drummer and percussionist for the biggest European Circus "Krone" in 1987. He has composed more than 40 works and cooperated with visual and performing artists, dancers and film directors composing soundtracks. Besides, his drumbooks "TAM TAM - Die Schlagzeugschule für Kinder I & II", both with monographs and CD were published in 1997/1998 and he invented and developed "DRUM BO - Rhythm & Power", a musical anti-violence program for youngsters.

Throughout the 1990s, Dahms explored various musical styles, such as tango nuevo, classical avant garde, Spanish and Latin music, Japanese 20th century literature, baroque music, impressionism, modernism, and all kinds of jazz. Focusing on solo performances as well, Dahms also made use of the midi-converter, combining the sound of the acoustic vibraphone with electronic and synthetic sounds.

Currently there are six individual genres in his most known repertoire:

- “DIVINE MOOD - a Bach selection”: concertos, suites, sonatas and partitas by Johann Sebastian Bach;
- “IN THE NAME OF LOVE”: masterpieces by Ravel, Debussy, Chaminade, Rimsky-Korsakow, Ibert, Milhaud etc.;
- “Matthias Dahms’ TRIO LOS CELOS (Trio Jealousy)” – brings about a new vision into Astor Piazzollas Tango music;
- “RESONANCE - future sounds of percussion”: 21st century solo-percussion;
- “MAGIC TRANCE” - a multimedia-concertperformance in cooperation with contemporary German, French, Russian and Chinese artists;
- “LATIN BREEZE” – a collection of world-famous masterpieces of Latin Jazz.

== Publications ==
=== Works for Percussion ===
- Prismatic Rain for vibraphone solo (1990)
- Zilch Tune No. 2 for vibraphone and marimba (1990)
- Reflexiones sobre España (Reflections over Spain) for flute and vibraphone (2005)
- The Dream of the Melting Planets for vibraphone and marimba (dedicated to André Wolff) (1996)
- Gedanken eines Grammophonbesitzers for voice, percussion and electronic gear (after Bertold Brecht) (1999)
- It just so happens for 2 snare drums (1997)
- Schöne Jugend (Lovely Childhood) for voice, vibraphone and tape (after Gottfried Benn) (1991)
- 8 Rhythmicals for percussion ensemble (TALK!!!, MOVE!!!, DANCE!!! etc.) (1998–2003)
- It just so happens, that it just so happens, that ... for 2 snare drums (1997)
- Construction in Space I (with net) for drumset alone (2007)
- Construction in Space II (without net) for percussion setup (2007)
- TAM TAM - Die Schlagzeugschule für Kinder, Vol. 1 & 2 (w/CDs) (1989/1998)
- Twilight of the Godz for percussion ensemble and rock band (2000)
- Pet Shop Ballet #1 for marimba and drumset (2007)
- Phrizzy Phruity Phrozen Phrygian Phrench Phries for marimba and drumset (optional) (2007)
- Raumschwingung 1.0 for trumpet, piano, and 2 percussionists (2008)

=== Other works (collection) ===
- Trancemigration of Soulz (1997)
- Ballet of Lights (1997)
- The Age of Miracles (1997)
- The Sea of Blossoms (1997)
- Zoe bei Sternenlicht (1997)
- Star of Glass (1997)
- Das Vogelspinnenballett (1989)
- Die vereisten Gärten des Jack Frost (1987)
- Here's Looking at You, Kid (1991)
- Catwalk of Love (1991)
- Cosmic Light (1992)
