= Dahme =

Dahme may refer to:

== Places ==
- Dahme, Brandenburg, a town in Brandenburg, Germany
- Dahme, Schleswig-Holstein, a municipality in Schleswig-Holstein, Germany
- Dahme (river), a river in Brandenburg, Germany
- Dahme-Spreewald, a district of Brandenburg, Germany

== People with that surname ==
- Kimberley Dahme (born 1966), rock/country music singer and songwriter, former member of the band Boston
