= List of saxophonists =

Instruments key:

- s, Sopranino
- S, Soprano
- A, Alto
- T, Tenor
- B, Baritone
- b, Bass
- c, Contrabass (or tubax)
- sc, Subcontrabass

Indicators key:

- X, the instrument has been used by a person or a group
- X, a person or group has used the instrument, but much less often than other X-marked instruments
- C, person or group uses a C melody saxophone (either as primary instrument, or in addition to the normal tenor sax)
- F, person or group uses an F Mezzo-soprano saxophone in addition to the E♭ alto sax.

Name	Lifetime	s	S	A	T	B	b	c	sc	Genre
Mindi Abair	1969-		X	X						Smooth jazz
Greg Abate	1947-		X	X	X	X				Bebop
Ray Abrams	1920-1992				X					Jazz
George Adams	1940-1992				X					Jazz
Pepper Adams	1930-1986					X				Jazz
Cannonball Adderley	1928-1975		X	X						Jazz
Gerald Albright	1957-		X	X	X					Jazz
Eric Alexander	1968-				X					Jazz
Harry Allen	1966-				X					Jazz
Lee Allen	1926-1994				X					R&B
Marshall Allen	1924-			X						Jazz
Luiz Americano	1900-1960				X					Choro
Gene Ammons	1925-1974				X					Jazz
Fred Anderson	1929-2010				X					Jazz
Ian Anderson	1947-	x	X	x						Rock
Elie Apper	1933-				X					Classical
Buddy Arnold	1926-2003				X					Jazz
Harry Arnold	1920-1971				X					Jazz
Harold Ashby	1925-2003				X					Jazz
Georgie Auld	1919-1990				X					Jazz
Albert Ayler	1936-1970			X	X					Jazz
Jerome Badini					X					Nu jazz
Gabe Baltazar	1929-			X						Jazz
Greg Banaszak	1966-		X	X						Classical
Linda Bangs							X			Classical
Gato Barbieri	1932-2016				X					Jazz
Eddie Barefield	1909-1991				X					Jazz
Phillip Barham	1957-		X	X	X					Classical
Paul "Polo" Barnes	1901-1981		X							Jazz
Charlie Barnet	1913-1991		X	X	X					Swing
Kjell Bartholdsen	1938-2009				X					Jazz
Gary Bartz	1940-		X	X						Jazz
Paul Bascomb	1912-1986				X					Jazz
Sidney Bechet	1897-1959		X							Jazz
Jay Beckenstein	1951-		X	X						Smooth jazz
Captain Beefheart	1941-2010		X	X	X					Rock
Bob Belden	1956-2015		X		X					Jazz
Tex Beneke	1914-2000				X					Swing
Bob Berg	1951-2002		X		X					Jazz
Kristian Bergheim	1926-2010				X					Jazz
Sean Bergin	1948-2012			X	X					Jazz
Jerry Bergonzi	1947-		X		X					Jazz
Tim Berne	1954-			X		X				Jazz
Chu Berry	1908-1941			X	X					Jazz
Gary Bias	1962-			X	X					Jazz
Rolf Billberg	1930-1966			X						Jazz
Gus Bivona	1915-1996			X	X					Jazz
Jane Ira Bloom	1955-		X	X						Jazz
T. K. Blue	1953-			X						Jazz
Hamiet Bluiett	1940-2018				X	X	X			Jazz
Arthur Blythe	1940-2017	X	X	X	X					Free jazz, jazz
Arno Bornkamp	1959-		X	X	X					Classical
Earl Bostic	1913-1965			X						R&B
Mwata Bowden	1947-				X	X				Jazz
Ralph Bowen	1961-				X					Jazz
David Bowie	1947-2016		X	X	X	X				Rock
Charles Brackeen	1940-		X		X					Jazz, free jazz
Anthony Braxton	1945-	X	X	X+F	C	X	X	X		Jazz
Michael Brecker	1949-2007		X		X					Jazz
Willem Breuker	1944-2010		X	X	X	X				Jazz
James Briggs (Jimmy the Robot)	1978-				X					Ska
Nick Brignola	1936-2002		X	X		X				Jazz
Napoleon Murphy Brock	1945-				X					Rock, jazz
Tina Brooks	1932-1974				X					Jazz
Peter Brötzmann	1941-			X	X	X	X			Free jazz
Les Brown	1912-2001			X						Jazz, swing
Marion Brown	1931-2010			X						Jazz
YolanDa Brown	1982-		X	X	X					Jazz
Cornelius Bumpus	1946-2004			X						Jazz, rock
Jane Bunnett	1956-		X							Jazz
Garvin Bushell	1902-1991			X						Jazz
Sam Butera	1927-2009				X					R&B, big band
Don Byas	1912-1972				X					Jazz
Ernie Caceres	1911-1971			X		X				Jazz
Sid Caesar	1922-2014				X					Swing
Hadley Caliman	1932-2010		X		X					Jazz
Ed Calle	1969-		X	X	X	X				Jazz
Ace Cannon	1934-2018			X	X					Rock
Tim Cappello	1955-				X					R&B, rock, jazz
Ronald Caravan	1946-	X	X	X	X					Classical
Harry Carney	1910-1974			X		X				Jazz
Pete Carney	1974-		X	X	X	X				Acid jazz
Benny Carter	1907-2003			X						Jazz
Daniel Carter	1945-		X	X						Free jazz
James Carter	1969-	X	X	X+F	C	X	X			Jazz
George Cassidy	1936-2023			X	X					Jazz
Emilio Castillo	1968-				X					Soul, funk
Serge Chaloff	1923-1957					X				Jazz
James Chance	1953-			X						No wave, funk, free jazz
Igo Chico					X					Afrobeat
Pete Christlieb	1945-				X					Jazz, bebop
Jeff Clayton	1954-2020			X						Jazz
Clarence Clemons	1942-2011		X	X	X	X				Rock
Bill Clinton	1946-				X					Jazz
Arnett Cobb	1918-1989				X					Jazz
Jeff Coffin	1965-		X	X	X	X				Jazz
Anat Cohen			X		X					Jazz
Paul Cohen		X	X	X	X	X	X	X	X	Classical
Al Cohn	1925-1988				X	x				Jazz
Ornette Coleman	1930-2015			X	X					Free jazz
Steve Coleman	1956-			X						Jazz
Dana Colley	1961-		x		X	X	x			Rock
Mel Collins	1947-		X	X	X	X				Rock, jazz
John Coltrane	1926-1967		X	X	X					Jazz
Ravi Coltrane	1965-		X		X					Jazz
Alix Combelle	1912-1978				X					Jazz
Junior Cook	1934-1992				X					Jazz
Bob Cooper	1925-1993				X					Jazz
Martin Cooper	1958-				X					New wave
Lol Coxhill	1932-2012	X	X		X					Free improv
Hank Crawford	1934-2009			X						Jazz, R&B
Sonny Criss	1927-1977			X						Jazz
Ronnie Cuber	1941-2022					X				Jazz
King Curtis	1934-1971		X	X	X					Rock & roll, soul, blues
Claire Daly	1958-					X				Jazz
Eric Darius	1982-				X					Jazz, smooth jazz
Julian Dash	1916-1974				X					Jazz
Eddie "Lockjaw" Davis	1922-1986				X					Jazz
Charles DeChant			X	X	X	X				Blue-eyed soul
Daniel Deffayet	1922-2002			X	X					Classical
Claude Delangle	1957-		X	X	X	X	X	X		Classical
Karl Denson	1956-				X					Jazz, funk
Paul Desmond	1924-1977			X						Jazz
Stefano di Battista	1969-		X	X						Jazz
Manu Dibango	1933-2020		X	X	X	X				Jazz funk
Amy Dickson	1982-		X	X						Classical
Klaus Doldinger	1936-		X		X					Jazz
Eric Dolphy	1928-1964			X						Jazz
Arne Domnérus	1924-2008			X						Jazz
Sam Donahue	1918-1974				X					Swing
Lou Donaldson	1926–2024			X						Hard bop
Daniel Dorff	1956-				X	X				Classical
Jimmy Dorsey	1904-1957			X						Jazz
Paquito D'Rivera	1948-		X	X	X					Latin jazz
Steve Duke	1954-		X	X						Contemporary classical
Candy Dulfer	1969-			X						Smooth jazz
Hans Dulfer	1940-				X					Jazz
Paul Dunmall	1953-		X		C					Free jazz
Teddy Edwards	1924-2003				X					Jazz
Larry Elgart	1922-2017			X						Jazz, swing
Richard Elliot	1960-		x	x	X					Smooth jazz
Alfred "Pee Wee" Ellis	1941-2021		X	X	X	X				Jazz
Booker Ervin	1930-1970				X					Jazz
Wayne Escoffery	1975-				X					Jazz
Ellery Eskelin	1959-				X					Jazz
Bill Evans	1958-		x		X					Jazz
Herschel Evans	1909-1939				X					Jazz
Joe Evans	1916-2014			X						Jazz
Sandy Evans			X		X					Jazz
Stump Evans	1904-1928				C					Jazz
Douglas Ewart	1946-	X		X						Free jazz
Joe Farrell	1937-1986		X		X					Jazz
Mirko Fait	1965-	X			X					Smooth jazz, ambient
Wilton Felder	1940-2015				X					Jazz, fusion, R&B
Herbie Fields	1919-1958			X	X					Jazz, R&B
Gavin Fitzjohn	1985-				X	X				Jazz, rock
Christian Forshaw				X						Classical
Frank Foster	1928-2011		X		X					Jazz
Gary Foster	1936-	x	X	X	X					Jazz
Jean-Yves Fourmeau			X	X						Classical
Charlie Fowlkes	1916-1980					X				Jazz
Joel Frahm	1969-		X		X					Jazz
Bob Franceschini	1961-		X	X	X					Jazz
Bud Freeman	1906-1991				X					Jazz
Chico Freeman	1949-				X					Jazz
Von Freeman	1923-2012				X					Jazz
Bob Fuller	1898-?		X			X				Jazz
Tia Fuller	1976-			X						Jazz, R&B
Kenny G	1956-		X	X	X					Smooth jazz
Al Gallodoro	1913-2008			X						Jazz, classical
Jan Garbarek	1947-		X		X		X			Jazz
Bunk Gardner	1933-		X	X	X					Jazz, rock
Joe Garland	1903-1977				X					Jazz
Kenny Garrett	1960-		X	X	X					Jazz
Blaise Garza	1989-	X	X	X+F	C	X	X	X	X	Rock, Jazz
George Garzone	1950-		X		X					Jazz, free jazz
Charles Gayle	1939-			X	X	X				Free jazz
Stan Getz	1927-1991				X					Jazz
John Gilmore	1931-1995				X	X				Jazz
Vince Giordano	1952-						X			Jazz
Jimmy Giuffre	1921-2008				X					Jazz
Vinny Golia	1946-	X	X		X	X	X	X	X	Jazz
Benny Golson	1929-				X					Jazz
Paul Gonsalves	1920-1974				X					Jazz
Kadri Gopalnath	1950-2019			X						Carnatic
Bob Gordon	1928-1955					X				Jazz
Dexter Gordon	1923-1990		X		X					Hard bop
Doudou Gouirand	1940-		X	X						Jazz
Glen Gray	1906-1963			X						Jazz
Wardell Gray	1921-1955				X					Jazz
Bunky Green	1935-			X						Jazz
Leo Green	1972-				X					Rock
Euge Groove	1962-		X	X	X					Smooth jazz
Steve Grossman	1951-2020		X		X					Jazz
Gigi Gryce	1925-1983			X						Jazz
Lars Gullin	1928-1976					X				Jazz
Jascha Gurewich	1896-1938			X	C					Classical_music
Mats Gustafsson	1964-	X	X	X	X	X		X		Free jazz
Lawrence Gwozdz	1953-		X	X						Classical
Dick Hafer	1927-2012				X					Jazz
Elisa Hall	1853-1924			X						Classical
Greg Ham	1953-2012				X					Reggae
Lenny Hambro	1942-1995			X	X	X				Jazz, swing, bebop, mambo
Andy Hamilton (jazz musician)	1918-2012				X					Jazz
Andy Hamilton (pop musician)	1953-				X					Pop
Scott Hamilton	1954-				X					Jazz
Craig Handy	1960-				X					Jazz
John Handy	1933-			X						Jazz
Keitaro Harada	1985-		X	X						Classical
Otto Hardwick	1904-1970		X	X		X				Jazz
John Harle	1956-		X	X	x					Classical
Rufus Harley	1936-2006		X		X					Jazz
Billy Harper	1946-		X		X					Jazz
Joe Harriott	1929-1973			X						Jazz
Eddie Harris	1934-1996				X					Jazz
Donald Harrison	1960-			X						Jazz, smooth jazz, hip hop
Coleman Hawkins	1904-1969				X			X		Jazz
Jimmy Heath	1926-2020		X	X	X					Jazz
John Helliwell	1945-		X	X	X	X				Rock
Frederick L. Hemke	1935-2019		X	X	X					Classical
Julius Hemphill	1938-1995		X	X	X					Jazz
Joe Henderson	1937-2001				X					Jazz
Ian Hendrickson-Smith	1974-			X	x	x				Jazz
Ernie Henry	1926-1957			X						Jazz
Haywood Henry	1913-1994					X				Jazz
Woody Herman	1913-1987		X	X						Jazz
Chuck Higgins	1924-1999				X					R&B
Monk Higgins	1936-1986				X					Jazz
Warren Hill	1991-		X	X						Smooth jazz
Johnny Hodges	1906-1970		X	X						Jazz
Red Holloway	1927-2012			X	X					Jazz
Ron Holloway	1953-				X					Jazz, R&B, blues, funk, rock
Bill Holman	1927-				X					Jazz
Michael Holmes	1982-			X	X					Classical
Kyle Horch	1964-									Classical
Lynn Hope	1926-1993				X					R&B
Jim Horn	1940-			X	X					Blues, rock, R&B
James Houlik	1942-				X					Classical
Joe Houston	1926-2015				X					R&B
Vincent Ingala	1992-				X					Smooth jazz, Urban jazz, R&B
Mihai Iordache	1967-			X	X	X				Jazz, funk, punk, rock
David Jackson	1947-		X	X	X	X				Progressive rock
Franz Jackson	1912-2008				X					Jazz
Javon Jackson	1965-				X					Jazz
Illinois Jacquet	1922-2004				X					Jazz
Hilton Jefferson	1903-1968			X						Jazz
Budd Johnson	1910-1984				X					Jazz
Floyd "Candy" Johnson	1922-1981				X					Jazz
Howard Johnson	1941-2021					X				Jazz
Howard E. Johnson	1908-1991			X						Jazz
Plas Johnson	1931-				X					Bebop, R&B, blues, jazz
David Jones	1888?-1956?									Jazz
Sarah Jones (a.k.a. Sarah Smith or Sarah Cutts)	1960-			X	X					Rock, chamber folk
Clifford Jordan	1931-1993		X		X					Jazz
Edward "Kidd" Jordan	1935-2023	X	X	X	C	X				Jazz
Louis Jordan	1908-1975			X						R&B
Richie Kamuca	1930-1977				X					Jazz
Ori Kaplan	1969-			X		X				Jazz
Bruce Kapler	1953-		X	X	X	X	X			Rock, R&B
Jackie Kelso	1922-2012				X					Jazz, rock, R&B
Theodore Kerkezos			X	X						Classical
John-Edward Kelly	1958-2015			X						Classical
Bobby Keys	1943-2014				X	X				Rock
Rahsaan Roland Kirk	1935-1977		X	X	X					Free jazz, jazz
John Klemmer	1946-		X	X	X					Smooth jazz
Al Klink	1915-1991				X					Jazz
Lynn Klock	1950-		X	X						Classical
Sigurd Køhn	1959-2004			X						Jazz
Ian Kirkham	1963-		X	X	X	X				Pop, smooth jazz, jazz
Lee Konitz	1927-2020			X						Jazz
Dave Koz	1963-		X	X	X	X				Smooth jazz
Karel Krautgartner	1922-1982			X						Classical, jazz
Jonas Kullhammar	1978-	X	X	X	X	X	X			Jazz
Stephen "Doc" Kupka	1946-					X				Funk
Fela Kuti	1938-1997		X							Afrobeat
Femi Kuti	1962-			X						Afrobeat
Seun Kuti	1982-				X					Afrobeat
Trent Kynaston	1946-		X	X	X					Classical, jazz
Guy Lacour	1932-2013				X					Classical
Steve Lacy	1934-2004		X							Jazz
Guy Lafitte	1927-1998				X					Jazz
Oliver Lake	1942-		X	X	X					R&B
Harold Land	1928-2001				X					Hard bop
Brian Landrus	1978-		x		x	X	X			Jazz
Prince Lasha	1929-2008			X						Jazz
Yusef Lateef	1920-2013				X					Jazz
Géraldine Laurent	1975-			X						Jazz
Abdon Laus	1888-1945			X						Classical
Clifford Leaman			X	X						Classical
Amy Lee	1963-	X	X	X	X	X				Smooth jazz, jazz, R&B
Cecil Leeson	1902-1989		X	X						Classical
Min Leibrook	1903-1943						X			Jazz
Michael Lewis	1946-		X	X	X					Jazz
Dave Liebman	1946-		X		X					Jazz
Lin Chien-Kwan	1972-			X						Classical
Magnus Lindgren	1974-				X					Jazz
John Linnell	1959-			X	X	X	X			Pop, rock
Charles Lloyd	1938-			X	X					Jazz
Jean-Marie Londeix	1932-		X	X	X	X				Classical
Julien Lourau	1970-			X	X					Jazz
Joe Lovano	1952-		X	X	X+C					Jazz
Joseph Lulloff	1960-		X	X	X	X				Classical
Anders Lundegård			X	X						Classical
Claude Luter	1923-2006		X							Jazz
Arun Luthra			X	x	X					Jazz
Andy Mackay	1946-		X	X	X	X				Rock
Steve Mackay	1949-2015				X					Punk rock
Fraser MacPherson	1928-1993				X					Jazz
Rudresh Mahanthappa	1971-			X						Jazz
Joe Maini	1930-1964			X						Jazz
Didier Malherbe	1943-		X	X	X		X			Progressive rock, jazz fusion
Steve "The Count" Marcus	1939-2005		X		X					Jazz, fusion
Rick Margitza	1961-				X					Jazz
Charlie Mariano	1923-2009		X	X						Jazz, fusion
Eric Marienthal	1957-		X	X	X					Jazz
Lou Marini	1945-	X	X	X	X	X	X	X	X	Jazz
Branford Marsalis	1960-		X	X	X	X				Jazz, classical
Warne Marsh	1927-1987				X					Jazz
Jerry Martini	1943-			X	X					Soul, funk, rock
Lenny Massey	1988-				X					Jazz
Sabir Mateen	1951-									Jazz
Parker Matla	2013-			X						
Stuart Matthewman	1982-			X	X					Smooth Jazz
Bennie Maupin	1940-		X		X					Jazz
Timothy McAllister	1972-		X	X						Classical
Tommy McCook	1927-1998				X					Reggae
Jackie McLean	1932-2006			X						Hard bop
René McLean	1946-			X	X	X				Hard bop
Harold McNair	1932-1971			X	X					Jazz
Big Jay McNeely	1927-2018				X					R&B
Joe McPhee	1939-			X						Jazz
Charles McPherson	1939-			X	X					Jazz
Patrick Meighan	1949-			X						Classical
Jay Migliori	1930-2001				X					Jazz
Chris Mercer					X					R&B, rock
Charles Miller	1939-1980			X	X					Funk
Eddie Miller	1911-1991				X					Jazz
Bob Mintzer	1953-		X		X					Jazz
Billy Mitchell	1926-2001				X					Jazz
Roscoe Mitchell	1940-	X	X	X	X	X	X			Jazz
Hank Mobley	1930-1986				X					Jazz
J. R. Monterose	1927-1993		X		X					Jazz
Jack Montrose	1928-2006				X					Jazz
James Moody	1925-2010			X	X	X				Jazz
Jemeel Moondoc	1951-2021			X						Free jazz
Angelo Moore	1965-		x	x	x	X	X			Rock
LeRoi Moore	1961-2008		X	X	X	X	X			Rock, jazz
Wild Bill Moore	1918-1983				X					R&B
Frank Morgan	1933-2007			X						Jazz
Van Morrison	1945-		X	X	X					Rock
Dick Morrissey	1940-2000		X		X					Jazz
Bob Mover	1952-		X	X	X					Jazz
Marcel Mule	1901-2001		X	X						Classical
Gerry Mulligan	1927-1996		X	X	X	X				Jazz
Otis Murphy	1972-		X	X	X					Classical
David Murray	1955-				X					Jazz
Don Murray	1904-1929			X	X	X				Jazz
Vido Musso	1913-1982				X					Jazz
Boots Mussulli	1915-1967			X						Jazz
Don Myrick	1940-1993			X	X					R&B
Derek Nash	1961-		X	X	X	X				Big band
Ted Nash (born 1922)	1922-2011			X	X					Jazz
Ted Nash (born 1960)	1960-				X					Jazz
David "Fathead" Newman	1933-2009		X	X	X	X				Jazz
Albert Nicholas	1900-1973			X						Jazz
Jack Nimitz	1930-2009					X				Jazz
Enzo Nini	1954-		X	X	X					Jazz
Ryo Noda	1948-			X						Classical
Steve Norman	1960-			X						Pop
Norbert H. J. Nozy	1952-			X						Classical
Luis Nubiola	1974-			X						Jazz
Greg Osby	1960-		X	X						Jazz
Gerald Oshita	1942–1992			X	X	X				Jazz, contemporary classical
Fausto Papetti	1923-1999			X						Smooth jazz
Walter Parazaider	1945-			X	X					Rock
Johnny Paris	1940-2006				X					Rock & roll
Charlie Parker	1920-1955			X	X					Bebop
Evan Parker	1944-		X		X					Free improv
Maceo Parker	1943-			X	X					R&B, funk
J. D. Parran			X		X	X	X			Free jazz
Dick Parry	1942-2026				X	X				Rock
Tony Pastor	1907-1969				X					Swing
Lee Patrick	1938-			X						Classical
Pat Patrick	1929-1991					X				Jazz
Anders Paulsson	1961-		X							Classical, Jazz
Cecil Payne	1922-2007					X				Jazz
Dave Pell	1925-2017				X					Jazz
Kirk Pengilly	1958-									Rock
Ken Peplowski	1959-				X					Jazz
Art Pepper	1925-1982			X	X					Jazz
Jim Pepper	1941-1992				X					Jazz
Houston Person	1934-				X					Jazz
Flip Phillips	1915-2001				X					Jazz
Reuben Phillips	????-1974			X						Jazz
Lenny Pickett	1954-		X	X	X	X				R&B, funk
Dave Pietro	1964-		X	X	C					Jazz
St. Clair Pinckney	1930-1999				X	X				Funk
Courtney Pine	1964-		X	X	X	X				Jazz, jazz fusion
Harvey Pittel	1943-	X	X	X	X					Classical
Dan Plonsey	1958-		X	X	C	X				Free jazz
Rudy Pompilli	1926-1976				X					Rock & roll
Michel Portal	1935-									Jazz, classical
Chris Potter	1971-		X	X	X					Jazz
Noah Preminger	1986-				X					Jazz
Russell Procope	1908-1981		X	X	X	X				Jazz
Ike Quebec	1918-1963				X					Jazz
Gene Quill	1927-1988			X						Bebop
Paul Quinichette	1916-1983				X					Jazz
Kenneth Radnofsky	1953-		X	X						Classical
Boyd Raeburn	1913-1966						X			Jazz
Boots Randolph	1927-2007			X	X					Rock & roll
Sigurd Raschèr	1907-2001	X	X	X	X	X	X	X		Classical
Raphael Ravenscroft	1954-2014			X						Rock
Danny Ray	1951-				X					Rock
Vi Redd	1928-2022			X						Jazz
Dewey Redman	1931-2006				X					Free jazz
Don Redman	1900-1964			X						Jazz
Joshua Redman	1969-		X	X	X					Jazz
Alto Reed	1948-2020	X	X	X	X	X	X			Rock
Don Rendell	1926-2015		X		X					Jazz
Jerome Richardson	1920-2000		X	X	X	X				Jazz, big band
Kim Richmond	1940-		X	X	X	X				Jazz
Debra Richtmeyer	1957-		X	X						Classical
Sam Rivers	1923-2011		X		X					Jazz
Tyler Rix	1993-		X	X						Classical
Pat Rizzo	1941-2021			X	X					Soul, funk, rock
David Roach	1955-		X	X						Classical
Matana Roberts	1975-			X						Jazz
Scott Robinson	1959-				C	X		X		Jazz
Adrian Rollini	1904-1956						X			Swing
Sonny Rollins	1930-2026				X					Jazz
Bernt Rosengren	1937-2023				X					Jazz
Hubert Rostaing	1918-1990				X					Jazz
Ned Rothenberg	1956-			X						Free improv
Charlie Rouse	1924-1988				X					Jazz
Eugene Rousseau	1932-		X	X						Classical
Marshal Royal	1912-1995			X						Jazz
Pee Wee Russell	1906-1969				X					Jazz
Babe Russin	1911-1984				X					Jazz
John Sampen	1949-			X						Classical
Edgar Sampson	1907-1973			X		X				Jazz
David Sanborn	1945-2024		X	X						Smooth jazz
Pharoah Sanders	1940-2022		X	X	X					Jazz
Adolphe Sax	1814-1894	X	X	X	X	X	X			Classical
Jacques Schwarz-Bart	1962-				X					Jazz
Louis Sclavis	1953-		X			X				Jazz
Cecil Scott	1905-1964				X					Jazz
Tom Scott	1948-	X	X	X	X	X				Jazz fusion
Al Sears	1910-1990				X					Jazz
Gene Sedric	1907-1963				X					Jazz
Bud Shank	1926-2009			X						Jazz
Elliott Sharp	1951-		X	X	X					Experimental
Archie Shepp	1937-		X	X	X					Jazz
Andy Sheppard	1957-		X		X					Jazz
Bob Sheppard	1952-		X	X	X					Jazz
Euclid James "Motorhead" Sherwood	1942-2011		X		X	X				Rock, jazz
Sahib Shihab	1925-1989		X	X		X				Bebop
Yasuaki Shimizu	1954-				X					Classical, jazz
Wayne Shorter	1933-2023		X	X	X	X				Jazz
Omer Simeon	1902-1959		X	X		X				Jazz
Sonny Simmons	1933-2021			X						Jazz
Zoot Sims	1925-1985		X	X	X					Jazz
Hal Singer	1919-2020				X					R&B
Donald Sinta	1937-			X						R&B
Steve Slagle	1952-			X						Jazz
Rodney Slater	1944-			X		X	X			Rock
Ben Smith	1905-????			X	X					Jazz
Buster Smith	1904-1991			X						Jazz
Jon Robert Smith	1945-			X						Rock
Julian Smith	1969-		X	X	X					Smooth jazz, pop, soul, mambo
Tab Smith	1909-1971			X						Jazz, R&B
Tommy Smith	1967-		X	X	X					Jazz
Willie Smith	1910-1967			X						Swing
Gary Smulyan	1956-					X				Jazz
James Spaulding	1937-			X						Jazz
Roger Ruskin Spear	1943-				X		X			Rock
Chris Speed	1967-				X					Jazz
Dick Stabile	1909-1980			X						Swing
Hal Stein	1928-2008			X	X					Jazz
Herbie Steward	1926-2003		X		X					Jazz
Sonny Stitt	1924-1982			X	X	X				Bebop
Vernon Story	1922-2007				X					Bebop
Ira Sullivan	1931-2020		X	X	X					Jazz
Ed Summerlin	1928-2006				X					Jazz
John Surman	1944-		X			X				Jazz
Lew Tabackin	1940-				X					Jazz
Richard Tabnik	1952-			X						Jazz
Buddy Tate	1913-2001				X					Jazz
Paul Taylor	1960-		X	X	X					Pop, smooth jazz, R&B
Sam "the Man" Taylor	1916-1990		X	X	X					Jazz, R&B, pop
John Tchicai	1936-2012		X		X					Jazz
Larry Teal	1905-1984			X	X					Classical
Joe Temperley	1929-2016					X				Jazz
Frank Teschemacher	1906-1932			X						Jazz
Joe Thomas	1909-1986				X					Jazz
Pete Thomas		X	X	X	X	X	X			Rock
Barbara Thompson	1944-		X	X	X					Jazz
Lee Thompson	1957-			X	X	X				Ska
Lucky Thompson	1924-2005		X		X					Jazz
Theo Travis	1964-		X		X					Jazz, Rock, Ambient
Alejandro Toledo	1977-		X	X						Contemporary, Classical, World
Frankie Trumbauer	1901-1956			X	X	C				Jazz
Kenneth Tse	1972-		X	X						Classical
Mark Turner	1965-				X					Jazz
Nik Turner	1940-		X	X	X					Space rock
Stanley Turrentine	1934-2000				X					Jazz
Kazutoki Umezu	1949-		X	X						Free jazz
Ian Underwood	1939-		X	X	X	X				Jazz, rock
Ken Vandermark	1964-									Jazz
Cindy Vela	1979-			X						Jazz
Charlie Ventura	1916-1992				X					Jazz
Eddie Vinson	1917-1988			X						Jazz
Greely Walton	1904-1993				X					Jazz
Mark Walton	1957-		X	X	X	X				Classical
Carlos Ward	1940-			X	X					Classical
David S. Ware	1949-2012		X	X	X					Jazz
Pete Wareham	?				X	x				Punk jazz, alternative rock
Earle Warren	1914-1994			X						Jazz
Grover Washington Jr.	1943-1999		X	X	X	X				Smooth jazz, jazz
Jack Washington	1910-1964					X				Jazz
Tyrone Washington	1944-				X					Jazz
Benny Waters	1902-1998				X					Jazz
Bobby Watson	1953-			X						Jazz
Ernie Watts	1945-		X	X	X (Note: Watts plays a straight C-melody mystery horn in Zappa's The Grand Wazoo)					Jazz, fusion
Noble "Thin Man" Watts	1926-2004				X					R&B
Doug Webb	1960-			X	X					Jazz
Ben Webster	1909-1973				X					Jazz
Ben Wendel					X					Jazz
Frank Wess	1922-2013			X	X					Jazz
Crawford Wethington	1904-1994									Jazz
Kirk Whalum	1958-		X		X					Jazz fusion
Andrew White	1942-2020			X	X					Jazz
Chris White	1955-		X	X	X	X				Jazz, rock
Harry White	1967-		X	X						Classical
Steve White	1925-2005				X	X				Jazz
Rudy Wiedoeft	1893-1940			X	C					Classical
Barney Wilen	1937-1996		X		X					Jazz
Ernie Wilkins	1922-1999			X	X					Jazz
Eddie Williams		X								Jazz
Mars Williams	1955-	X	X	X	X					Jazz, free jazz, acid jazz, rock, funk
Pamela Williams				X						Jazz
Paul Williams	1915-2002			X		X				R&B
Dick Wilson	1911-1941				X					Jazz
Steve Wilson	1961-		X	X						Jazz
Paul Winter	1939-		X	X						Jazz, world music
Don Wise	1957-			x	X					R&B, soul
Francis Wong			X		X					Jazz
Chris Wood	1944-1983		X	X	X	X				Rock
Phil Woods	1931-2015		X	X						Bebop
Andrew Woolfolk	1951-2022	X	X	X						R&B
John Worley	1919-1999			X						Classical
Laurence Wyman				X						Classical
Lester Young	1909-1959				X					Jazz
Daniel Zamir	1981-		X	X						Free jazz, Jewish music
John Zorn	1953-			X						Free jazz
Name	Timespan	s	S	A	T	B	b	c	sc	Genre

== Fictional saxophonists ==
- Bleeding Gums Murphy (The Simpsons)
- Lisa Simpson - (The Simpsons)
- Henry Jones Jr. (The Young Indiana Jones Chronicles, soprano)
- Zoot (The Muppets)

== See also ==
- Lists of musicians
- List of jazz saxophonists
