= North American Saxophone Alliance =

Non-profit organization for saxophonists

- Formation: 1 January 1976
- President: Andrew J. Allen
- Website: www.saxophonealliance.org www.nasaconference.com

The North American Saxophone Alliance (NASA) is an organization for saxophone players from around North America.

== History ==
Following the lead of their colleagues in France, who created the Association of French Saxophonists in 1971, the North American Saxophone Alliance was established in 1976 under the leadership of Frederick Hemke. Since this time, NASA has offered state, regional, and international conferences attracting many important saxophonists to present performances, lectures and master classes, as-well-as found competitions for the next generation of classical and jazz saxophonists. NASA is the largest saxophone organization in the western hemisphere dedicated to the establishment of the saxophone as a medium of serious musical expression.

Members are required to pay dues, which vary depending on age. NASA hosts regional conferences for each of its 10 regions (information below). It also hosts a biennial international conference.

== Past NASA biennial conferences ==
- 1994: West Virginia University (host: David Hastings & Curtis Johnson)
- 1996: University of Florida (host: Jonathan Helton)
- 1998: Northwestern University (hosts: Frederick Hemke & Jonathan Helton)
- 2000: University of Arizona (host: Kelland Thomas)
- 2002: University of North Texas (host: Eric Nestler)
- 2004: University of North Carolina (host: Steve Stusek)
- 2006: University of Iowa (host: Kenneth Tse)
- 2008: University of South Carolina (host: Clifford Leaman)
- 2010: University of Georgia (host: Kenneth/Stephen Fischer)
- 2012: Arizona State University (host: Timothy McAllister)
- 2014: University of Illinois at Urbana-Champaign (hosts: Debra Richtmeyer & J. Michael Holmes)
- 2016: Texas Tech University (host: David Dees)
- 2018: University of Cincinnati (host: James Bunte)
- 2020: Arizona State University (host: Christopher Creviston)
- 2023: The University of Southern Mississippi (host: Dannel Espinoza)
- 2024: Oklahoma State University (hosts: Johnny Salinas & Tommy Poole)
- 2026: Ohio State University (host: Michael Torres)

== Leadership ==
Founding coordinator

1976–1978: Frederick Hemke

Presidents

1978–1980: Eugene Rousseau
1980–1984 Steven Mauk
1984–1986: Kenneth Fischer
1986–1988: Ronald Caravan
1988–1991: Dale Underwood
1992–1993 William Street
1994–1996: Michael Jacobson
1997–1999: Kandace Brooks
1999–2000: John Sampen
2001–2002: Paul Bro
2003–2004: Joseph Lulloff
2005–2006: Jonathan Helton
2007–2008: Steven Stusek
2009–2010: Debra Richtmeyer
2011–2012: John Nichol
2013–2014: Clifford Leaman
2015–2016: Kenneth Tse
2017–2018: Griffin Campbell
2019–2020: Christopher Creviston
2021-2022: Jessica Voigt-Page
2023-2024: Kimberly Goddard Loeffert
2025-2026: Andrew J. Allen

== Regions ==
NASA is divided into eleven regions dividing Canada, the United States of America, and surrounding territories.

- Region 1: Washington, Oregon, Idaho, Montana, Wyoming, Alaska
- Region 2: California, Nevada, Utah, Arizona, Colorado, New Mexico, Hawaii
- Region 3: North Dakota, South Dakota, Nebraska, Minnesota, Iowa
- Region 4: Kansas, Oklahoma, Missouri, Texas, Arkansas
- Region 5: Wisconsin, Illinois, Indiana, Ohio, Michigan
- Region 6: Louisiana, Mississippi, Alabama, Georgia, Florida, Puerto Rico
- Region 7: Kentucky, Tennessee, Virginia, North Carolina, South Carolina, Maryland, Delaware, Washington, D.C.
- Region 8: New York, Pennsylvania, New Jersey, West Virginia, Connecticut, Massachusetts, Rhode Island, Vermont, New Hampshire, Maine
- Region 9: British Columbia, Alberta, Saskatchewan, Manitoba, Yukon, Northwest Territories
- Region 10: Ontario, Quebec, Newfoundland, New Brunswick, Nova Scotia, Prince Edward Island

== Publication ==
- The Saxophone Symposium is the official peer-reviewed journal of NASA (ISSN 0271-3705)
