= Kenneth Tse =

American saxophonist (born 1972)

Kenneth Tse (謝德驥)
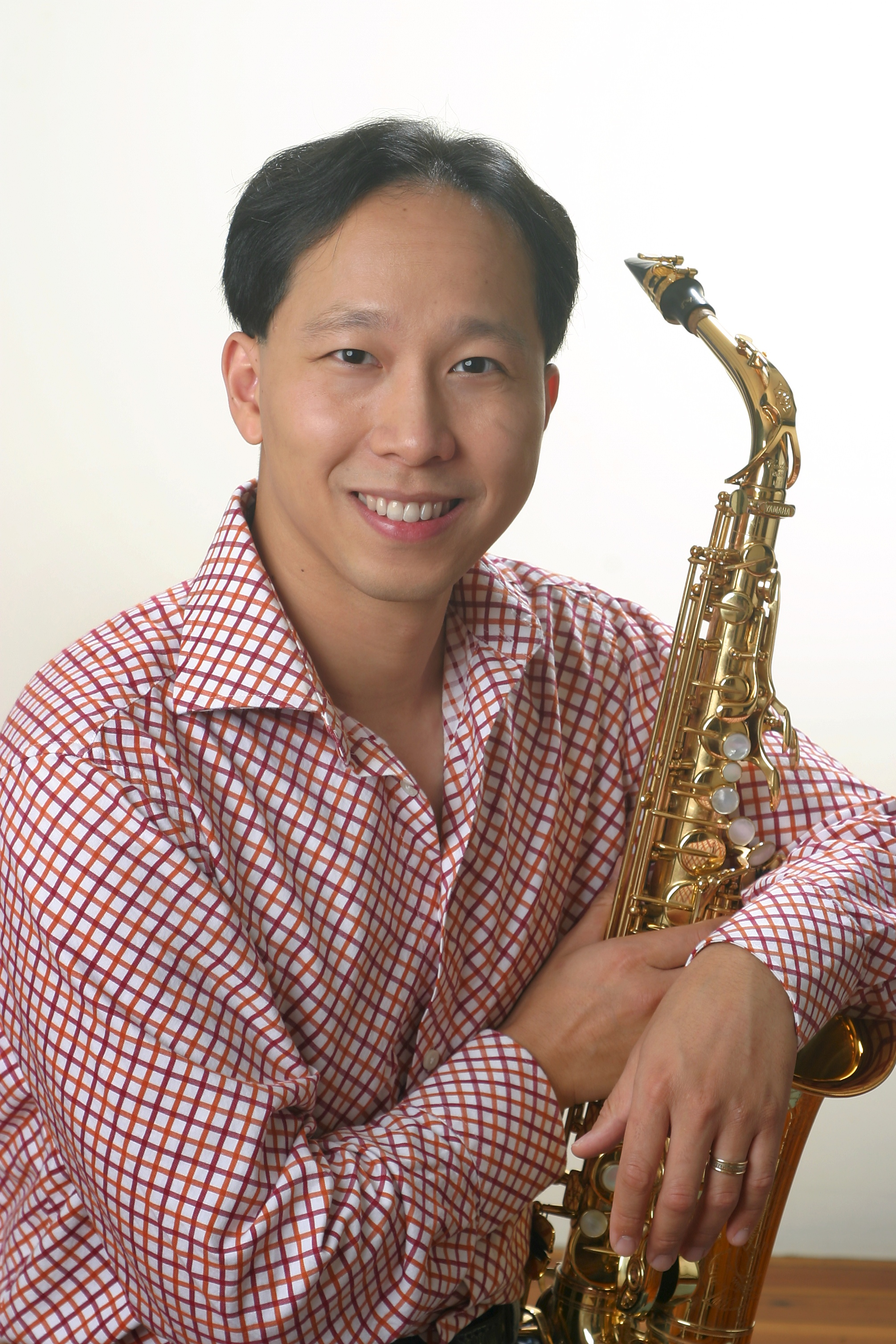
- Kenneth Tse Portrait

Background information
- Also known as: Kenneth Tse
- Born: Kenneth Tak-Kei Tse; 1972 (age 53–54); Kowloon, Hong Kong
- Genres: Classical
- Occupations: Professor and soloist
- Instruments: Soprano saxophone Alto saxophone Tenor saxophone Baritone saxophone
- Years active: 1985 – present
- Label: Crystal Records
- Website: Kenneth Tse

Kenneth Tse 謝德驥 (born 1972) is a Chinese American classical saxophonist. He studied at the Indiana University School of Music with Eugene Rousseau from 1993 to 1998, where he received his BM, MM, and Artist Diploma. Rousseau has called him "a brilliant saxophonist, worthy of any stage in the world." Tse earned a doctorate degree at the University of Illinois Urbana-Champaign studying under saxophonist Debra Richtmeyer.

== Biography ==
Kenneth Tse started his performance career in 1996 as the winner of the prestigious New York Artists International Award, which resulted in an acclaimed debut recital at Carnegie Hall, after which he was hailed as “a young virtuoso” by The New York Times. The Alex Award from the National Alliance for Excellence led to another Carnegie Hall performance. These are but two of the multitude of awards that Tse has garnered in less than a decade and a half. Since then he has been a frequent soloist on five continents, including solo appearances with the Des Moines Symphony, United States Navy Band, Slovenia Army Band, La Armónica Band of Bunol, Spain, Thailand Philharmonic Orchestra, and Hong Kong Sinfonietta among others. He is frequent featured artist at events such as the triennial World Saxophone Congress and North American Saxophone Alliance conferences. He has also been a guest clinician at conferences hosted by the California Band Directors’ Association, Iowa Bandmaster's Association, and the Midwest International Band and Orchestra Clinics. Prestigious universities and conservatories worldwide, such as Moscow Conservatory and Paris Conservatory have invited him to give master classes.

He has received numerous awards and grants including the prestigious Hong Kong Jockey Club scholarship, New York Music Performance Trust Fund, Indiana University Marcel Mule Scholarship, University of Iowa CD Subvention Fund, Arts and Humanities Initiative Grant, Barlow Commission Fund, as well as an honorary life membership from the Contemporary Record Society.

In 2009, desiring to give back to his home city, Hong Kong, Tse created the first Hong Kong International Saxophone Symposium which attracted over 70 saxophonists from around the world to join the event. In addition to Tse, Eugene Rousseau from University of Minnesota and Claude Delangle from the Paris Conservatory were the faculty members to 12 active participants from three continents. With the tremendous success of the premiere event, Tse has formed the Hong Kong International Saxophone Society as part of an effort to facilitate more interest in saxophone performance as well as to continue hosting the symposium every two years to expose Asian saxophonists to world-class saxophone performers and teachers.

== Teaching career ==
Tse is currently the Professor of Saxophone at University of Iowa, President-elect of the North American Saxophone Alliance and the vice president of the International Saxophone Committee. He holds degrees from the University of Illinois Urbana-Champaign (D.M.A.), Indiana University (B.M., M.M. and Artist Diploma) and Hong Kong Academy for Performing Arts. He received the prestigious Artist Diploma from Indiana University School of Music.

== Recordings ==
- "Saxophone Pictures"- Works by David DeBoor Canfield, Erwin Dressel, and Modest Mussorgsky. Crystal Records CD780 2013
- "Chamber Music, Vol. 3"- Works by David DeBoor Canfield. Enharmonic Records 2013
- "Written for Kenneth"- Works by David DeBoor Canfield. Enharmonic Records 2012
- "Martyrs for the Faith"- American Saxophone Concertos, 2012. Works by Paul Creston, David DeBoor Canfield, John Cheetham, and Ingolf Dahl.
- "Stony Brook Soundings Vol. I" (BRIDGE 9318) featuring Kenneth Tse and Escher String Quartet, music by Perry Goldstein
- "Stellar Saxes" Duo recording with Nobuya Sugawa 2008, Crystal Records (CD359)
- "Adolphe Sax Series Volume IX", 2006, University of Arizona Recordings (AUR CD3122), featuring Dale Underwood and Kenneth Tse
- "Pas de Trois", 2006, Crystal Records (CD 358), trio music for saxophone, bassoon, and piano by Feld, Froom, Goldstein, Freund, and van Beurden.
- "Seven Settings", 2006, University of Iowa, this is a disc contains works for saxophone by University of Iowa composers
- "Lyric Soprano, 2005, Crystal Records (CD 658), music for soprano saxophone only by Naulais, Bedard, Worley, Lewis, including arrangements by Tse of music by Pusculli, Faure, Albeniz, and Piazzolla.
- "An American Exhibition", 2002, Crystal Records (CD 657), this disc contains all music by American composers such as Canfield, Cheetham, Larsen, Still, Vosk, Hartley, and Lewis; some of the pieces were written specially for Tse
- "In Memory", 2000, Enharmonic Records (ENCD00-014), this is a disc dedicated to his deceased mother, containing music by Bach, Canteloube, Reed, Husa, et al.
- "Sonate", 1997, RIAX Records (RICA-2002), music by Maslanka, Saint-Saens, Rueff, and Worley
- "Sparkling Sax", 1996, Crystal Records (CD 656), was his debut solo disc containing music by Feld, Muczynski, Heiden, Bernstein, etc.
