= Andrew J. Allen =

American musician (born 1986)

Andrew J. Allen (born 1986) is an American classical and contemporary saxophonist and pedagogue who is currently an associate professor of music at Georgia College & State University in Milledgeville, Georgia and serves as President of the North American Saxophone Alliance.

== Career ==
He has previously served on the faculties of Midwestern State University, Valley City State University, and Claflin University. He currently serves as a member of the Allen Duo, The Palmetto Saxophone Quartet, and the saxophone/percussion duo Rogue Two. He has appeared as a soloist with the Wichita Falls Symphony Orchestra, the University of Arkansas Wind Symphony, and the Oklahoma State University Chamber Orchestra and has performed in orchestras in Georgia, Michigan, South Carolina, Tennessee, and Texas. Allen has performed throughout the United States, Canada, Great Britain, France, and Croatia including appearances at the 16th, 17th, and 18th World Saxophone Congress and conferences of the North American Saxophone Alliance, the College Music Society, and the National Association of College Wind and Percussion Instructors. He has premiered many new works for the saxophone by such composers as Jay Batzner, Fang Man, Robert Lemay, François Rossé, Jesse Jones, Greg Simon, and Annie Neikirk, among many others. Allen holds degrees from Tennessee Tech University, Central Michigan University, and the University of South Carolina, and his teachers include Phillip Barham, John Nichol, and Clifford Leaman, and he has received additional instruction from Joseph Lulloff, Arno Bornkamp, and Claude Delangle, among others. His articles and reviews have appeared in such publications as the NASA Update, The Saxophone Symposium, The Instrumentalist, Teaching Music, School Band and Orchestra Magazine, JazzEd, The Texas Bandmasters Review, and Saxophone Today, and he serves as assistant editor of The Saxophone Symposium. He currently serves as an Artist-Clinician for the Conn-Selmer Corporation and is a Vandoren Artist. Allen is President of the North American Saxophone Alliance.

== Discography ==
- "The Avenging Spirit" (The SAGA Quartet) 2021
- "Spring Shadows: Electronic Solo Works" (Anne Neikirk) 2020
- "Step Inside: New American Music for Saxophone and Piano" (Rogue Two) 2017
