= Dale Underwood =

American saxophonist (born 1948)

Dale Underwood (born 1948) is an American saxophonist best known for his 30-year career with the U.S. Navy Band through which he influenced the further development of the classical saxophone audience and repertoire.

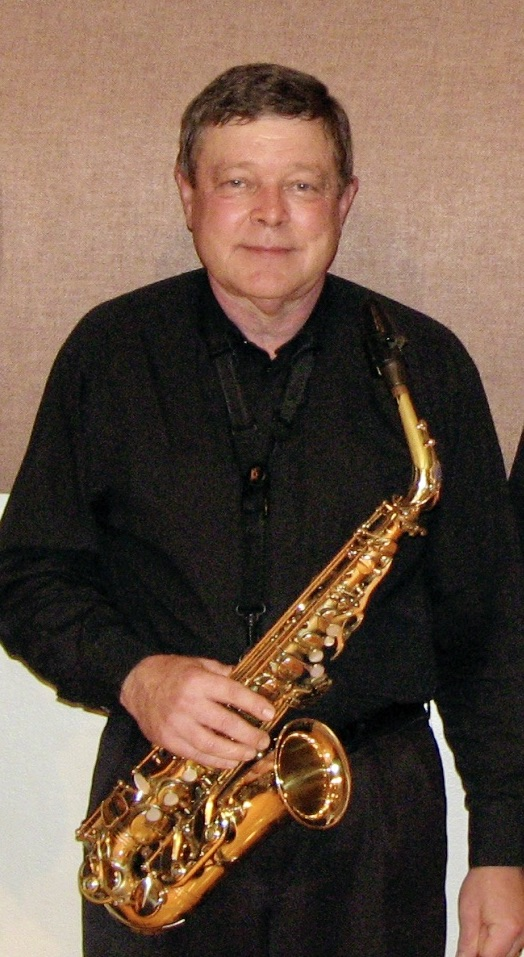
Dale Underwood, saxophonist

== Early life ==
Born in 1948, Underwood grew up in Cortland, New York. He began saxophone at age nine and first studied with Alfred Fabrizio, and later Bob Carabia. Underwood attended Homer High School and during these years his teachers included Charles Roberts, Kenton Briggs, and Joseph Rioden. During this time, the Ithaca College band performed at Homer High School, and featured saxophonist Donald Sinta on Maurice Whitney's Introduction and Samba. This occasion greatly influenced Underwood.

In anticipation of attending college for music education, Underwood began clarinet studies, as being a saxophone major was uncommon at this time. His clarinet teacher was Donna Yacavone, who had recently graduated from Ithaca College and incidentally studied with Donald Sinta. After hearing Underwood's advanced ability on the saxophone, Yacavone connected Underwood with Sinta. While in high school at age 15, Underwood traveled with Yacavone to Ithaca, NY, to study with saxophonist Donald Sinta. Underwood studied with Sinta for two years. Underwood's career goals shifted from music education to music performance.

Underwood graduated from high school in 1966. In the fall of 1966 he attended Onondaga Community College in Syracuse, NY.

== Performing career ==
In the spring of 1967, he took an audition at Armed Forces School of Music in Norfolk, VA and was accepted. Underwood enlisted in the U.S. Navy May 1, 1967. He entered the Navy School of Music, then officially joined the Navy Concert Band on July 1, 1968. By the fall of 1969, Underwood had established himself the saxophone soloist with the band.

Underwood's unique talent attracted the interest of composers who sought to write solo features for him to perform. Among these were Urban Carvalho's Song and Dance; Clare Grundman's Concertante; and Claude T. Smith's Fantasia.

Underwood performed for every U.S. president from Lyndon B. Johnson until William J. Clinton.

Underwood held his position as saxophone soloist with the US Navy Band until his retirement from the military in 1997.

Underwood's US Navy career, in combination with a wealth of guest soloist and recital appearances, has taken him to 49 states and many countries including Canada, Cuba, Brazil, England, the Netherlands, Germany, Belgium, France, Sweden, Italy, China and more. He performed with Boston Pops Orchestra, the National Symphony Orchestra, Australian Wind Orchestra, and the National Conservatory Orchestra in São Paulo, Brazil, among many others.

== International Saxophone Symposium ==
Underwood established the International Navy Band Saxophone Symposium in 1978. This annual event features numerous internationals guest artists, concerts, recitals, lectures, and master classes.

== North American Saxophone Alliance ==
Underwood was president of the North American Saxophone Alliance from 1988 to 1991. During his tenure as president, NASA commissioned Sonata by David Maslanka.

== Works composed for Underwood ==
- Appledorn, Mary Jeanne Van - Liquid Gold
- Beltrami, Edson - Fantasia C.P. 122 For Alto Saxophone and Orchestra
- Campos, Antonio Carlos Neves - Cocando a Sax
- Carvalho, Urban F. - Song and Dance
- Chattaway, Jay - Double Star
- Chattaway, Jay - Nocturne
- Chattaway, Jay - Ritual and Nocturne
- Del Borgo, Elliot - Canto
- Del Borgo, Elliot - Sonata #2
- Del Borgo, Elliot - Soliloquy and Dance
- Del Borgo, Elliot - Elegy II
- Grundman, Clare - Concertante
- Hartley, Walter - Concerto #2
- Makris, Andreas - Fantasy and Dance (solo with ensemble arrangement)
- Martino, Ralph - Americana Suite (arrangement)
- Martino, Ralph - A Salute to Cole Porter (arrangement)
- Martino, Ralph - Gershwin Fantasy (arrangement)
- Martino, Ralph - Jerome Kern Songbook (arrangement)
- Martino, Ralph - Songs on Love’s Philosophy
- Maslanka, David - Sonata (Underwood was President of NASA, who commissioned the piece)
- Nogueria, Hudson - Sax Colossus For Alto Saxophone And Orchestra
- Roccisano, Joe - Contrasts
- Shiffman, Harold - Cappricio Concertante
- Smith, Claude T. - Fantasia
- Taylor, Jeff - Dance and Intermezzo
- Vizzutti, Alan - Whirlwind
- Ward, David - Concert Piece for Alto Saxophone and Band

== Recordings ==
- Dale Underwood, Dale Underwood Alto Saxophone Soloist. Golden Crest Records crs-4136, 1975
- Dale Underwood, Dale Underwood Marjorie Lee. Golden Crest Records RE-7067, 1976
- Dale Underwood, Dale Underwood – Alto Saxophone Kate Lewis – Piano. Golden Crest Records RE-7091, 1979
- Dale Underwood, Dale Underwood - Alto Saxophone Ron Chiles, Mary Jeanne Van Appledorn – Piano. Golden Crest Records RE-7101, 1982
- Dale Underwood, Classic Pastiche. Open Loop CD 009. 1991
- East Coast Saxophone Quartet, Americana Suite, Open Loop CD 025. 1995
- Dale Underwood, Soliloquy. Open Loop CD 013. 1996
- Dale Underwood, Classic Pastiche. Open Loop CD 009. 1991
- Dale Underwood Master Class Altissimo. Saxophone Journal, Vol. 21, No. 1. 1996
- Dale Underwood, Symphonically Yours. Capri 75003–2. 1997
- Coastal Communities Concert Band, In Concert With Soloist From Washington, D.C. 1999
- Dale Underwood, Brazilian Sax. Albany Records TROY1692. 2017

== Academic teaching positions ==
- George Mason University
- Catholic University
- University of Maryland
- University of Miami – Frost School of Music
