= Ralph Hermann =

American composer and conductor

Ralph Hermann (February 9, 1914 – July 28, 1994) was an American composer and conductor. He also used the pseudonym Richard Hale. Hermann worked as head of the music department of the American Broadcasting Company (ABC) since 1952 until his retirement in 1971.

== Life ==
Hermann was born in Milwaukee, Wisconsin, and graduated from South Division High School. While in high school, he was awarded the Milwaukee Civic Music Medal for his outstanding musical commitment. He studied at the Juilliard School of Music under Vittorio Giannini. His career began at his high school, where he composed, among other music, Kiddie Revue and played in several local bands, eventually playing under national band leaders including Freddy Martin and Jimmy Dorsey. In 1940 he started working for WTMJ as an arranger; when he left for World War II military service in 1943, he had a Sunday morning show of his own. During his military service he worked in interrogation and organized an orchestra of German prisoners that played to American troops and displaced persons in France; he later organized a symphony orchestra in Wiesbaden.

On his return to the US, Paul Whiteman hired him and recommended him to NBC in 1945. In 1952 he moved to ABC, where Hermann worked as head of the music department until his retirement in 1971.

Beginning in 1954 he also wrote works for symphonic band, and works for soloists such as Al Gallodoro (saxophone and clarinet) and Eugene Rousseau (saxophone). His adaptations of well-known classical works for concert band are still programmed regularly, such as Porgy and Bess Medley for saxophone and band, Ellington Fantasy Rossini's Introduction, Theme, and Variations and Tosca Fantasy for saxophone and band. He won an Emmy Award in 1963 for his Symphony No. 3—From the Scriptures.

Ralph Hermann was married and had three children. He died at home in Manhasset, New York, after an illness following a stroke.

== Compositions ==
Works for orchestra

- Concerto for Doubles , for bass clarinet and orchestra
- Jewish Melodies for clarinet and orchestra

Works for wind band

- Arlinton Overture
- Belmont Overture
- Circus Time
- Clarinet Cake
- Concerto for Horn, for horn and band
- Fight Song (Fight for UWM) 1965

Iberian Rhapsody 1980 Jensen Publications

- International Airport
- Kiddie Ballet
  1. Overture
  2. Baby Baptism
  3. Strolling the Baby Stroller
  4. Lullaby for a Naughty Girl
  5. Cops and Robbers
  6. Nightmare and Finale
- Little Suite No. 1
- North Sea Overture
- Percussion Discussion
- Prelude and Caprice
- Pulchinello , for bass clarinet and wind band
- Sleighride Express
- Star Journey
- Straw Flower, concerto for alto saxophone and wind band
- Winter Bells
- Yellow Rose Of Texas

Works for choir

- Christmas Fantasy , for mixed choir and brass

Chamber music

- Clarinet on the Town , for clarinet and piano
- Concertino for saxophone-Quartet

Film music

- 1960 Directions television series

== Bibliography ==
- Wolfgang Suppan, Armin Suppan, Das Neue Lexikon des Blasmusikwesens , 4. Auflage, Freiburg-Tiengen, Blasmusik Schulz Verlag GmbH, 1994, ISBN 3-923058-07-1
- Paul E. Bierley, William H. Rehrig: The heritage encyclopedia of band music: composers and Their music , Westerville, Ohio: Integrity Press, 1991, ISBN 0-918048-08-7
- Jaques Cattell Press: ASCAP biographical dictionary of composers, authors and publishers , Fourth Edition, New York: RR Bowker, 1980, 589 p, ISBN 0-835212-83-1.
- Jean-Marie Londeix: Musique pour saxophone, Volume II: répertoire général des oeuvres et des ouvrages d'enseignement pour le saxophone Cherry Hill: Roncorp Publications, 1985
- Norman E. Smith: Band musicnotes , Revised Edition, San Diego, California: Niel A. Kjos, Jr., 1979, ISBN 978-0-849-75401-2
