= Sampen =

Sampen is a surname. Notable people with the surname include:

- Bill Sampen (born 1963), American baseball player
- John Sampen (born 1949), American classical saxophonist
