= Jeanine Rueff =

French composer and music educator

Jeanine Rueff (5 February 1922 – c. September 1999) was a French composer and music educator.

== Biography ==
Jeanine Rueff was born in Paris and studied at the Conservatoire de Paris with Tony Aubin, Henri Challan, Jean and Noël Gallon, and Henri Busser. During her time at the Paris Conservatory, she was awarded first prizes in harmony, fugue, counterpoint, composition and history of music. In 1948 she won second place in the Grand Prix de Rome with Odette Gartenlaub.

Rueff was a collaborative pianist at the Conservatoire de Paris beginning in 1950, accompanying students in the saxophone class of Marcel Mule and in the clarinet class of Ulysse Delécluse. She taught solfège, sight-singing, and aural skills there from 1960 to 1971. Later, Rueff also taught a harmony course, continuing until 1988.

Her long tenure at the Conservatoire de Paris suggests she influenced many other musicians. Her former pupils include many conservatory directors and teachers in regional and national schools and universities. Rueff's most famous pupil was Jean-Michel Jarre, a pioneer of French electronic music.

She wrote extensively for saxophone, saxhorn, euphonium, baritone horn, clarinet and cornet. Her compositions for saxophone are often used as required contest solos, and are taught in universities throughout the world.

Rueff was buried on 22 September 1999.

== Works ==
In 1945, Rueff received the Prix Favareille-Chailley-Richez for a jazz piano quintet. She also composed the chamber opera Le Femme d'Enée (1954), a concerto for four saxophones and a Symphonietta (1956).

Her portfolio includes many staples of the clarinet and saxophone canon, including:

- Concertino for Clarinet, Op. 15 (1950)
- Variazioni for clarinet (1976)
- Concert en Quatuor for Saxophone Quartet
- Concertino for Saxophone, Op. 17 for Alto Saxophone and Chamber Orchestra (1951)
- Chanson et Passepied, Op. 16 for Alto Saxophone and Piano (1951)
- Sonate for solo saxophone (1968)

Other notable works include a Trio for oboe, clarinet and bassoon (1960), Dialogues for viola and piano (1970) the chamber opera La Femme d'Énée (1954), a Symphonietta 1956), a Diptyque for flute and piano (1954). Additionally, Rueff composed numerous didactic works, which is unsurprising given her role as a professor at the Conservatoire de Paris. Her last composition, in 1999, was a series of concert pieces for bass trombone in the program of the Concours International de Trombone in Guebwiller.

Rueff's compositions have been performed internationally and recorded by notable musicians including Frederick Hemke, Annelies Vrieswijk, Joan Martí-Frasquier, Saxallegro Ensemble, and Quatuor Ellipsos.
