= Clifford Leaman =

American classical saxophonist

Clifford Leaman is an American classical saxophonist and is an associate dean and professor of saxophone at the School of Music of the University of South Carolina In January 2008, Leaman performed upon invitation at the 31st International Saxophone Symposium with the United States Navy Band. Dr. Leaman hosted the North American Saxophone Alliance in April 2008; the conference was held at the University of South Carolina's School of Music. Dr. Leaman was the Music Division co-chair for the South Carolina Governor’s School for the Arts and served as editor of reviews for the Saxophone Symposium, the North American Saxophone Alliance's annual publication.

Leaman is a saxophone soloist and clinician and has performed and given clinics across the globe. His teachers included Donald Sinta and David Bilger.

== Education ==
B.S. in music education, Lebanon Valley College in Pennsylvania, M.M. in woodwind instrument performance, University of Michigan and an A. Mus. D. in saxophone performance, University of Michigan

== Teaching career ==
He served on the faculties of Furman University, Eastern Michigan University, and the University of Michigan prior to his appointment at the University of South Carolina. Notable students include Connie Frigo, Adam Estes, Robert Young, Ian Jeffress, Matthew Younglove, Andrew J. Allen, Sheldon Johnson, Neal Postma, Po-Fang Chang, and Robert Gardiner.

== Performing career ==
An avid supporter of contemporary music, he has commissioned and given the world premiere performances of numerous pieces and is the editor of new music reviews for the Saxophone Symposium. Leaman is an artist-clinician for Conn-Selmer, Inc.

Dr. Leaman has performed as a soloist and clinician throughout the United States, Canada, Italy, Spain and China, where he was a featured guest artist for the 2004, 2005 and 2006 Yantai International Winds Art Festival and the 2005 Xi’an International Arts Festival.

== Previous recordings ==
Leaman is featured on a variety of recordings of solo and chamber works for Redwood Records, CRS, and the University of Arizona Recordings. Henry Brant's Concerto for Saxophone with Nine Instruments (Redwood Records) and Ernst Pepping's Suite für Trompete, Saxophon, und Posaune (CRS).

Ambassador Duo

"Since their debut at the 1990 Southwest Contemporary Music Festival and Conference in San Marcos, Texas, The Ambassador Duo has been active as a duo performing and giving clinics at numerous colleges, universities, and concert venues throughout the United States as well as in Canada, Italy, Spain, and China. Their repertoire covers a wide range of musical styles, from Baroque transcriptions to the most recent avant-garde works for saxophone and piano. The Ambassador Duo has inspired and commissioned many new works for saxophone and piano, including three of the works on this recording." Dr. Leaman, in collaboration with pianist Derek Parsons, formed the Ambassador Duo in 1990; and they have released three critically acclaimed compact discs on the Equilibrium label.

Dr. Leaman has released three compact discs in collaboration with pianist Derek Parsons for the Equilibrium label. These include:

Brilliance (EQ-21): Features the works of Leslie Bassett, William Bolcom, John Anthony Lennon, Mark Kilstofte and Ida Gotkovsky.

Excursions (EQ-55): Features the works of Paul Maurice, Sergei Rachmaninoff (trans. by Clifford Leaman), Robert Schumann (ed. by Fred Hemke), Bernhard Heiden, and Ralph Vaughan Williams (trans. by Clifford Leaman).

Illuminations (EQ-63): Features, among others, three works that were written for the duo.

Rosewind Duo

Formed in 2005, the RoseWind Duo consists of Scott Herring, percussion and Clifford Leaman, saxophones. They have given numerous performances and clinics at universities across the country, including appearances at Northwestern University, Central Michigan University, Eastern Michigan University, the University of Tennessee, and the University of Southern Mississippi. They have been invited to perform at many professional conferences, including the 2007 NASA Region 7 Conference in Greensboro, NC, the 2007 South Carolina Music Teachers Association State Conference, the 2007 International Navy Band Saxophone Symposium and the 2008 Biennial Conference of the North American Saxophone Alliance.

In May 2010, RoseWind traveled to France and Spain for two weeks of concerts and clinics. Stops on this tour included Zaragossa and Barcelona Spain, and Strasbourg and Paris France. In December 2010, the duo traveled to Beijing China as featured artists for The First International Wind and Percussion Festival held at the Beijing Central Conservatory. Most recently, the duo returned to Yantai, China for a concert at the Yantai Arts Center and five days of masterclasses and clinics with students from the Yantai Arts School and various parts of Shandong Province.

T'he RoseWind Duo's first CD, Release, is now available from Equilibrium Records, on iTunes, and Amazon Music. This recording features premiere recordings of new music for Saxophone and Marimba.

== Equipment ==
Dr. Leaman plays: A Selmer (Paris) Super Action 80 Serie II (Gold Plated) Alto Saxophone (Selmer S90 190 Mouthpiece, Rico Reserve #3.5, Bay Gold-Plated Ligature); a Selmer (Paris) Super Action 80 Serie III (Gold Plated) Soprano Saxophone, and a Selmer (Paris) Super Action 80 Serie II "Jubilee" Tenor Saxophone.
