= Hilary Tann =

Welsh composer

Hilary Tann (2 November 1947 – 8 February 2023) was a Welsh composer based in the United States.

== Career ==
Born in Llwynypia, Glamorgan (Wales), Tann held degrees in music composition from the University of Wales, Cardiff, and Princeton University. Her compositions are published by Oxford University Press. Tann's orchestral works have been released on the North/South Recordings CD Here, the Cliffs, – "music of great integrity, impeccable craft, and genuine expressive ambition" Robert Carl, Fanfare 36:I. Her overture, "With the Heather and Small Birds," commissioned by the 1994 Cardiff Festival, is her tribute to the land of her birth.

Until 2019 she was the John Howard Payne Professor of Music at Union College in Schenectady, New York, where she had been since 1980, teaching courses on music theory and composition, in addition to founding the Union College Orchestra. Tann was the invited Guest Composer-in-Residence for the 2011 Women in Music Festival, Eastman School of Music, where her commissioned work, "Exultet Terra" for SATB double chorus and double reed quartet was given its world premiere and the 2013 Women Composers Festival of Hartford.

== Honors and awards ==
Tann's honors included the selection of her piano composition, "Light from the Cliffs," as a repertoire choice in the 2012 William Kappell International Piano Competition and Festival. She received grants from ASCAP Standard Awards 1996–present, Meet The Composer, NEA, NYSCA, Welsh Arts Council, VW Trust, Holst Foundation, American Composers Forum, and the Hanson Institute for American Music Awards.

== Notable works ==
Her works include concertos for violin ("Here, the Cliffs" premiered by the North Carolina Symphony with Corine Brouwer Cook, 1997), alto saxophone ("In the First, Spinning Place" premiered by the University of Arizona Symphony with Debra Richtmeyer, March 2000), and cello ("Anecdote," premiered by the Newark [Delaware] Symphony with Romanian cellist Ovidiu Marinescu, December 2000).

"Shakkei," a diptych for oboe solo and chamber orchestra, was premiered by Virginia Shaw in the Presteigne Festival, August 2007, and has been performed multiple times, including in Dublin, at the 2008 IAWM Congress in Beijing, in New York City, Rio de Janeiro, San Francisco, and at the 15th World Saxophone Congress in Bangkok (2009), with Susan Fancher (solo soprano saxophone) and the Thailand Philharmonic Orchestra.

Other works include Psalm 104 (Praise, my soul), composed for the North American Welsh Choir, "Contemplations 21, 22" composed for the Radcliffe Choral Society, and First Watch, a composition for carillon.

== Selected works ==
=== For Orchestra ===
- As Ferns (1992), for string orchestra
- Walls of Morlais Castle (1998), for string orchestra
- Toward Dusk (2001), for string orchestra
- Water's Edge (1993), for string orchestra
- Adirondack Light (1992), for chamber orchestra
- Shakkei (2007), for chamber orchestra
- With the Heather and Small Birds (1994), for chamber orchestra
- Fanfare for a River (2001)
- From Afar (1996)
- From the Feather to Mountain (2004)
- High Rock Spring (2009)
- Reibo (2009)
- Sarsen (2001)
- Grey Tide and Green (2001)
- Open Field (1990)
- Through Echoing Timber (1996)

=== Instrumental Solos ===
- A Sad Pavan Forbidding Mourning (2002), for guitar
- Doppelganger (1984), for piano
- Embertides (2014), for organ
- First Watch (2003), for carillon
- Kilvert's Hills (2010), for bassoon
- Light from the Cliffs (2005), for piano
- Like Lightnings (2004), for oboe
- Look Little Low Heavens (1992), for trumpet
- Pinnae Ventorum (2006), for organ
- Seven Poems of Stillness (2008), for cello with optional narrator
- The Cresset Stone (1993), for cello, viola, or violin
- Windhover (1985), for soprano saxophone

=== Chamber Ensembles ===
- And the Snow Did Lie (Et La Neige Resta) (2014), for string quartet
- Duo (1981), for oboe and viola
- From the Song of Amergin (1995), for flute, viola, and harp
- Gardens of Anna Maria Luisa de Medici (2003), for flute, cello, and piano
- In the Theater of Air (2017), for piano, cello, and piano
- Llef (1995), flute and cello
- Melangell Variations (2018), for piano and soloists
- Nothing Forgotten (1997), for violin, cello, and piano
- Of Erthe and Air (1991), for flute, clarinet, and percussion
- On Ear and Ear... (2011), for piano and viola
- Shoji (2010), for flute and oboe
- ... Slate, Blue-Gray (2012), for violin, cello, and piano
- Solstice (2014), for marimba and piano
- Some of the Silence (2010), for saxophone quartet
- The Walls of Morlais Castle (2001), for oboe, viola, and cello
- Water's Edge (1994), for piano duet
- Winter Sun, Summer Rain (1992), for flute, clarinet, viola, cello, celeste

=== Vocal works ===
- A Girl's Song To Her Mother (1999), for soprano and oboe
- Arachne (1987), for soprano and crotale
- Between Sunsets (2012), for soprano and piano
- Melangell Variations (2018), for string orchestra, baritone, and soprano
- Mother and Son (1996), for soprano, E-flat clarinet, viola, cello
- Songs of the Cotton Grass (1999), for soprano and oboe
- Sound Dawn (1991), for tenor, baritone, bass, and piano
- The Moor (1997), for soprano and alto chorus
- Vale of Feathers (2005), for soprano and oboe
- Wings of the Grasses (2003), for soprano and oboe
