= Kyle Horch =

- Born: 1964 (age 61–62)
- Occupation: Saxophone professor
- Instrument: Saxophone

Kyle Horch (born 1964) is a classical saxophonist.

== Biography ==
Horch studied at Northwestern University in Chicago, U.S. with Frederick Hemke. He then won a BP North America Scholarship to pursue post-graduate study at the Guildhall School of Music and Drama with Stephen Trier.

As a young musician he was a prizewinner at many solo and chamber music competitions in Britain, Europe, and the USA. He has performed as a recitalist at the Purcell Room, Queen Elizabeth Hall, Blackheath Recital Hall, British and World Saxophone Congress, and many other venues in Britain and abroad.

He has released two recordings on the Clarinet Classics label: ChamberSax, which explores chamber repertoire for saxophone and other instruments, and AngloSax, a recital with piano of British and American works. Other solo recordings include John Carmichael’s Aria and Finale on ABC Classics, and the 2006-7 Associated Board Grade 8 Saxophone Syllabus (Associated Board Publications).

Much in demand as a freelance musician, Kyle has also performed in concerts, broadcasts, and CD recordings with a wide variety of ensembles including the Birmingham Contemporary Music Group, City of Birmingham Symphony Orchestra, Bournemouth Symphony Orchestra, Birmingham Royal Ballet, Composers Ensemble, Rambert Dance Company, London Musici, Mistral Saxophone Quartet, Piccadilly Dance Orchestra, and many others.

Kyle contributed chapters on saxophone technique and teaching to The Cambridge Companion to the Saxophone (Cambridge University Press, 1999), and has also written numerous articles and reviews for Music Teacher and Clarinet & Saxophone magazines. Kyle has been a saxophone professor at the Royal College of Music since 1993. Very committed to music education in all its forms, he has also taken part in numerous education projects with BCMG and other ensembles, and worked on short courses at Hindhead Music Centre and Benslow Music Trust. He has given masterclasses in Britain, France, the Netherlands, Norway, Ireland, Belgium, Switzerland, Australia, and the USA. He has been a saxophone professor at the Royal College of Music since 1991, and has taught saxophone students at Royal Holloway since 2011.
