= Presteigne Festival =

The Presteigne Festival is a classical music festival which takes place at the end of August each year in the town of Presteigne, situated in the Welsh Marches. The Festival promotes a wide variety of concerts together with many music-related activities.

== History ==
1983 - Presteigne Festival founded by a small group of local enthusiasts including Adrian Williams, the first artistic director;
1984 - Mid Border Arts formed to promote both the Festival and a series of year-round arts events;
1990 - Incorporation of Presteigne Festival of Music and the Arts Limited, which separated the Festival from Mid Border Arts;
1992 - Tenth anniversary ‘Open Borders’ Festival, which commissioned twelve new works, one from each of the then European Community countries;
1993 - Appointment of George Vass as Artistic Director. Presteigne Festival of Music and the Arts Limited registered as a charity;
1994 - Establishment of annual composer-in-residence scheme;
1999 - The Festival was short listed for one of the annual Royal Philharmonic Society awards (nominated again in 2003);
2006 - Pēteris Vasks first non-British composer-in-residence; Baltic music feature;
2007 - 25th anniversary festival which included seventeen world premieres. Australian musician Peter Sculthorpe was composer-in-residence;
2008 - New executive structure introduced, which enabled the Festival to become more flexible and professional in its outlook;
2010 - Introduction of a new community and education programme; introduction of an annual Competition for Composers;
2025 - Jamaican-born composer Eleanor Alberga was composer-in-residence.

== Aims ==
The Presteigne Festival specialises in the promotion of contemporary music and programmes contemporary works alongside standard repertoire. It supports living composers and aims to make their work more accessible. It focuses on nurturing young performers and composers. The festival also supports education projects for the local community.

== Funding ==
The Presteigne Festival is a registered charity and relies on grants, sponsorship and donations from individuals to maintain its activities. The Festival receives financial support from trusts, foundations, corporate supporters, government bodies and individuals. Around a third of the income is raised from ticket sales.

== Organisation ==
The Festival is run by a management team of three led by Artistic Director George Vass. The organisation is governed by a board of trustees. The Festival also has a president, Michael Berkeley and a group of vice-presidents – Geraint Lewis, David Matthews, Simon Mundy, Hilary Tann and Adrian Williams.
