= Debra Richtmeyer =

American musician (born 1957)

Debra Richtmeyer (born June 19, 1957) is an American classical saxophonist.

Born in Lansing, Michigan, Richtmeyer earned her B.M.E. and M.M. at Northwestern University, where she studied with Frederick L. Hemke. She is professor of saxophone at the University of Illinois Urbana-Champaign where she has served since 1991. Prior to her appointment at the University of Illinois, she served as saxophone professor at the University of North Texas College of Music from 1981 to 1991 and at the Lawrence University Conservatory of Music from 1980 to 1981.

Richtmeyer is an Honorary Life Member and past president of the North American Saxophone Alliance. In 1997 she became the first woman to perform as a concerto soloist with orchestra at a World Saxophone Congress, and in 2009 the first woman to teach a master class at the congress. Richtmeyer is a Selmer Paris saxophone artist.

Richtmeyer was saxophonist with the Dallas Symphony Orchestra in performances and recordings from 1981 to 1991 and has performed with ensembles such as the St. Louis Symphony Orchestra, the U.S. Navy Band, the Indianapolis Chamber Symphony, the Scottish Chamber Orchestra, the Slovak Radio Orchestra and the Zlin Philharmonic. She has performed as soloist and given master classes throughout North America and Europe and in Thailand and China.

== Partial discography ==
- Light of Sothis, Mark Records. Works by Tom Bourcier, Scott Wyatt, Cindy McTee, Paul Martin Zonn, Steven Everett, and Amy Quate
- Extravaganza for Saxophone and Orchestra, Albany Records. Works by David Ott, Richard Strauss, Sergei Rachmaninoff, and Alexander Glazunov
- World Without Words: Debra Richtmeyer and the University of Illinois 2008–2009 Saxophone Studio, Mark Records. Works by Hilary Tann, Keith Murphy, Erik Lund, Ed Martin, Dieter Mack, Henning Schröder, James Bunch, Stephen Andrew Taylor
- Saxophone Concerto, Navona Records. Works by Lee Actor

== Notable students ==
- Kenneth Tse, Professor of Saxophone at the University of Iowa
- Keitaro Harada, Opera and Orchestra Conductor
- Michael Holmes, Artist-Teacher of Saxophone and Head of Woodwinds at Roosevelt University Chicago College of Performing Arts and Director of Marketing for the North American Saxophone Alliance
