= Anders Lundegård =

Swedish saxophonist

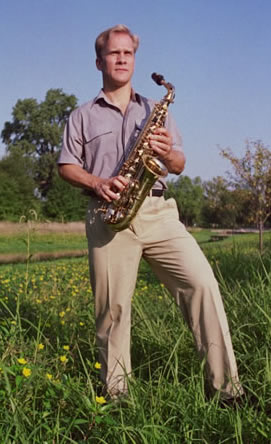
Anders Lundegård

Anders Olof Lundegård is a Swedish classical saxophonist. Lundegård is best known for his cello-like tone and intense performance style.

Anders Lundegård was born in Växjö, Sweden, and made his debut at seventeen as a soloist and broadcast performer during a youth artist festival in Stockholm. He earned his undergraduate degree as a student of Christer Johnsson at the Royal Swedish Academy of Music in Stockholm, whereupon he received both a Fulbright and a Sweden – America Foundation award to continue his studies in the United States. Lundegård completed his Master's, Certificate of Performance and Doctoral degrees at Northwestern University, studying under the renowned saxophonist Frederick Hemke. During this time he received three awards, toured with the Swedish chamber orchestra Musica Vitæ, had several works dedicated to him, and won the Northwestern Solo Concerto Competition, performing the subject of his dissertation: the Lars-Erik Larsson Saxophone Concerto.

Lundegård has taught (most recently at West Chester University) and toured extensively in Scandinavia and America, performing contemporary chamber, Baroque transcriptions and Classical concerti. As a young musician, he claims to have been inspired by an anecdote from the saxophone's early experimental stages in the 1850s. During an informal visit to the Belgian inventor, Adolph Sax’s, sweatshop, the Italian composer Gioachino Rossini proclaimed the sound of the new instrument as "the most tender and pleasing he had ever heard." Lundegård professed goal is to capture this "original sound," and he is particularly known for his solo recitals on alto and soprano sax, which include Bach Cello Suites (played at the original pitch) as well as Lundegård's own compositions.

== Performances and recordings ==
Lundegård's recent performances incorporate transcriptions of classical standard repertoire originally composed for strings and clarinet, as well as newly commissioned works. His performances of Astor Piazolla and Johann Sebastian Bach have been well received, as well as his premieres of new works by various Belgian and American composers. He toured Sweden in 2006 and performed for the U.S. State Department and the French Embassy in 2007, among others.
