= Harvey Pittel =

American saxophonist (1943–2026)

- Born: June 22, 1943; Los Angeles, California
- Origin: Los Angeles, California
- Died: 2026 (aged 82–83) Glendale, California
- Education: Clifford Street Elementary School in Los Angeles; University of Southern California; Northwestern University; Studies with Joseph Allard (Juilliard School)
- Genres: Classical, studio, all musical styles
- Occupations: Saxophonist, educator
- Instrument: Saxophones
- Years active: 1963–present
- Label: Centaur
- Website: www.harveypittel.com
- Military service
- Allegiance: United States
- Branch: United States Army
- Service years: 1968–1969
- Units: West Point Band

Harvey Pittel (June 22, 1943 – 2026) was an American saxophonist who performed principally in North America, and was the Professor of Saxophone at the University of Texas at Austin Sarah and Ernest Butler School of Music in the College of Fine Arts.

== Biography ==
=== Early life and education ===
Harvey Pittel began his musical education in at the age of 7 at Clifford Street Elementary School in Los Angeles, California. Pittel pursued his undergraduate degree in Music Education at the University of Southern California. He pursued his Master of Music degree in Saxophone Performance under the tutelage of Fred Hemke at Northwestern University.

=== Military service and early career ===
Pittel enlisted in the United States Army where he served for two years until 1969 and performed with the West Point Military Academy Band. He During this time he began further studies with Joseph Allard of the Juilliard School. Just after leaving the West Point Band, Pittel won the Concert Artists Guild Competition and through this made his Carnegie Hall debut in 1971 playing to such acclamation he was re-presented by the same organization in 1973.

=== Performing and teaching career ===
When Pittel's tour of duty was over he accepted a position as the saxophone teacher at University of Southern California. He also teaches at California State University, Fullerton, California State University, Long Beach, San Diego State University, East Los Angeles College, and University of Texas at Austin. He also tours with Harvey Pittel Duo, the Harvey Pittel Trio, and the Harvey Pittel Saxophone Quartet.

Along the way Pittel has been featured on a number of movie soundtracks, including Manhattan for Woody Allen, appeared as a guest on The Today Show, and been featured on Live From Lincoln Center. He has received numerous other awards including two Martha Baird Rockefeller Fund grants, and a National Endowment for the Arts Solo Recitalist grant.

=== Students ===
Former students include: Dr Jeffrey Benedict (faculty, Department of Music, California State University, Los Angeles), Dr Dan Goble (Dean, School of Visual and Performing Arts, Western Connecticut State University; also plays with the Harvey Pittel Saxophone Quartet), Todd Oxford (faculty, School of Music, Texas State University, San Marcos) Steve Mohacey (US Army Bands), Dr. Jack Cooper (faculty, University of Memphis, School of Music), Vincent Gnojek (faculty, School of Music, University of Kansas), Roger Greenberg (Retired from University of Northern Colorado), James Rotter (Retired, California State University, Fullerton, University of Southern California Thornton School of Music), Robert Medina (Elision Saxophone Quartet), Todd Yukumoto (University of Hawaiʻi), Javier Oviedo (faculty, Western Connecticut State University), Dr. Paul Haar (University of Nebraska–Lincoln), Rami El-Farrah (Faculty, School of Music, University of Texas at San Antonio) Mace Hibbard (Georgia State University), Andrew Harrison (Sonoma State University) Jeremy Justeson (Kutztown University of Pennsylvania), Allen Won (faculty, The Mannes College for Music), William Graves, James Hairston, Debra McKim (Hastings College). Branford Marsalis and Kenny Garrett are among the most notable jazz saxophonists that have studied with Pittel.

== Discography (selection) ==
- Orion Sax Quartet - Orion Saxophone Quartet With Special Guest, Harvey Pittel (Cenataur CRC 2455)
- Contrasts (CRS Artists 0686)
- With Jupiter Symphony: Live In New York (Crys- tal Records)
- With RCC Wind Ensemble: Shape Shifter (Sea Breeze Classical Records)
- With University of Texas Saxophone Ensemble: Over The Rainbow and Bach Again (Naxos)
- With University of Texas Saxophone Ensemble: Tex Sax Next Generation (Mark Records 7119)
- With University of Texas Saxophone Ensemble: Tex Sax (Mark Records 2280)
- Harvey Pittel Saxophone Quartet: It Might As Well Be Spring (HP Records 0400)
- With University of Texas Wind Ensemble: Husa/Maslanka Concertos (Mark Records 3932)
- With University of Texas Wind Ensemble: At Carnegie Hall (Mark Records 26970)
- La Linge, La Sonorite, A Tribute to Marcel Mule (Mark Records 5050)
- With Louisville Symphony: Music of Paul Chihara (New World Records 815)
- Harvey Pittel Saxophone Quartet: Live In Chicago (Mark Records 2106)
- With Jeff Helmer; Moving Along (Crystal 655)
- Bach and Noodles (Crystal 654)
- With the New York Philharmonic: Pictures At An Exhibition (CBS MK 35165)
- With Ry Cooder: Jazz (Warner Brothers BSK 3197)
- With Teresa Strata: Strata Sings Weill (Nonesuch 9 79131-1 F)
- Harvey Pittel Saxophone Quartet: A Little Night Music (@ 1987)
- Harvey Pittel with Louisville Symphony: Amram Ode to Lord Buckley (Louisville LS781)
- Harvey Pittel Saxophone Quartet: Don't You Remember The Time (Harojama 9743)
- Harvey Pittel with London Sinfonietta: Rodby Concerto (Crystal S500)
- Harvey Pittel with Westwood Wind Quintet – re issued on CD Sextour a vent (Crystal S 353)
- Harvey Pittel Trio (Crystal S157)
- Harvey Pittel Saxophone Quartet (Crystal S155)
- Harvey Pittel Plays Music for Alto and Soprano Saxophones (Crystal S105)
