= John Sampen =

American classical saxophonist

John Sampen (born 1949) is an American classical saxophonist.

Sampen's degrees are from Northwestern University (B.M., 1971; M.M., 1972; and Doctor of Music, 1984). His teachers included Frederick Hemke, Larry Teal, and Donald Sinta. He has served as professor of saxophone at Bowling Green State University in Bowling Green, Ohio since 1977. His wife is the composer and pianist Marilyn Shrude.

Sampen plays all types of the saxophone. He specializes in new music, and has commissioned over 60 new works for these instruments, from composers such as Samuel Adler, William Albright, Milton Babbitt, William Bolcom, John Cage, Michael Colgrass, John Harbison, Donald Martino, Ryo Noda, Pauline Oliveros, Bernard Rands, Gunther Schuller, Elliott Schwartz, Marilyn Shrude, Morton Subotnick, and Vladimir Ussachevsky.

== Partial discography ==
- Sampen, John: The Electric Saxophone. Works by Bunce, Cage, Furman, Mobberley, Shrude, Tower, and Ussachevsky. Brooklyn, New York: Capstone Records, CPS-8636, 1997.
- Sampen, John and Marilyn Shrude: Shadows and Dawning. Works by Albright, Beerman, and Shrude. Albany, New York: Albany Records, Troy526, 2002.
- Sampen, John and Marilyn Shrude: Visions in Metaphor. Works by John Adams, Milton Babbitt, Karel Husa, Pauline Oliveros, William Albright, Samuel Adler, Marilyn Shrude, Bernard Rands, Philip Glass, and Joan Tower. Albany, New York: Albany Records, Troy442, 2001.

== Notable students ==
- James Umble, saxophone professor at Youngstown State University
- Brent Bristow, Professor of Music, Director of Bands, and Professor of Saxophone at Arkansas State University Beebe
- Michael Ibrahim, saxophone professor at West Virginia University
- Scotty Stepp, Professor of Saxophone at DePauw University, Indiana University, and the University of Indianapolis
- Susan Cook, saxophone professor at Depaul University
- Russell Peterson, saxophone professor at Concordia College
- Michael Holmes, Artist-Teacher of Saxophone and Head of Woodwinds at Roosevelt University Chicago College of Performing Arts and Director of Marketing for the North American Saxophone Alliance
- Joseph Murphy, saxophone professor at Mansfield University
- Ryan Muncy, Executive Director of Ensemble dal Niente, Chicago, IL
- Shannon Ford, freelance saxophonist and member of Sax 4th Avenue
- Christopher Blossom, saxophonist with the United States Army Field Band
- Adrienne Welker, saxophonist with the United States Navy Band
- David Babich, saxophonist with the United States Navy Band
- Jeff Heisler, saxophone professor at Oakland University
- James Fusik, saxophone professor at Wayne State University
- Andrew Braet, saxophonist with the Band of the Irish Guards, British Army
- Noa Even, saxophone professor at Rowan University
- Matthew Younglove, saxophone professor at Tennessee Tech University
- Rhonda Taylor, saxophone professor at New Mexico State University
- Cody Greenwell, saxophone professor at California State University, Bakersfield
- Garret Klauss, classical saxophone performist & saxophone teacher at L'anse Creuse High School and Dakota High School In Macomb County Michigan
- Joshua Heaney, saxophone professor at Oklahoma City University
