= Michael Holmes (saxophonist) =

American classical saxophonist

- Born: 1982 (age 43–44)
- Citizenship: American
- Occupation: American classical saxophonist

Michael Holmes (born 1982) is an American classical saxophonist, originally from Findlay, Ohio.

Holmes' degrees are from Bowling Green State University (B.M.E.) and the University of Illinois (M.M. and D.M.A.). His main teachers included John Sampen and Debra Richtmeyer, and has had additional studies with Jean-Marie Londeix, Claude Delangle, Griffin Campbell, Daniel Kientzy, and Eugene Rousseau. Michael is the Teacher of Saxophone at Florida Gulf Coast University. He formerly served as Artist-Teacher of Saxophone as-well-as Head of Woodwinds at Roosevelt University Chicago College of Performing Arts. He was also formerly on faculty at the University of Illinois, the College of Wooster, and University of Notre Dame. Holmes also held positions as Director of Product Marketing for Saxophones at Conn-Selmer and Artistic Advisor and Product Specialist for Vandoren.

Holmes has received international acclaim as an orchestral saxophonist, and has performed as principal saxophonist with numerous orchestras including the Chicago Symphony Orchestra, the Cleveland Orchestra, the St. Louis Symphony Orchestra, the Hong Kong Philharmonic, the Peninsula Music Festival Orchestra, the Columbus Symphony Orchestra, the Fort Wayne Philharmonic Orchestra, Sinfonia da Camera, the Toledo Repertoire Theatre, and the Champaign-Urbana Symphony.

== Partial discography ==
- Chicago Symphony Orchestra, Prokofiev: Suite from Romeo and Juliet - CSO Resound
- SORI CD - Aucourant Records
- World Without Words - Mark Records
- Music from SEAMUS, volume 16 - Society for Electro-Acoustic Music in the United States
- Celestial Dancers, Philharmonia à Vent Ensemble - Klavier Records
