= Pete Carney =

- Origin: Chicago, Illinois
- Genres: Jazz
- Occupations: Musician, DJ, College Professor
- Instrument: Saxophone
- Labels: Loopjazz, Peter carney, Loopjazz Records

Peter Carney is an American saxophonist, recording artist, and DJ from Chicago. His ensemble, Pete Carney and Orange Alert, is an acid jazz group that has performed in the UK and the United States.

== Orange Alert ==
Before launching Orange Alert, Carney traveled with soul singer Otis Clay and performed at jazz festivals in Italy, France, Germany, Norway, Finland, Sweden, England, and Germany. Carney’s composition Redline Groove, was lifted anonymously for the DePaul Basketball Band who played it during March Madness at Madison Square Garden.

== Interactive Listening ==
In 2009 he began working on a new method for listening to music, frustrated with the traditional music history textbooks that were available, Carney worked for two years to create a new educational system based on Socrates’ ancient method of continuous questioning, which he called Interactive Listening.

== Personal life ==
Carney studied with William Albright, William Bolcom, Bright Sheng, Donald Sinta, and Glenn Watkins. Turning to Jazz, he studied at the University of Miami and completed his Master’s in Jazz at Florida International University. Dr. Pete Carney received his Doctorate in Jazz from The University of Illinois. Recently he conducted the University of Illinois Concert Jazz Band and Orchestra at The Jazz Education Network Conference in Louisville KY.

== Works ==
=== Solo albums ===
- 2004 Orange Alert
- 2007 Redline Groove
- 2010 Who Me?
