= Marilyn Shrude =

American composer

Marilyn Shrude (born July 6, 1946) is an American composer of contemporary classical music and pianist, and Distinguished Artist Professor of composition at Bowling Green State University, since 1977.

== Life ==
Born in Chicago, Illinois, Shrude graduated from Alverno College and Northwestern University. Her composition instructors include Alan Stout and M. William Karlins.

Her scores are published by American Composers Alliance, Éditions Henry Lemoine (Paris), Neue Musik Verlag Berlin, Southern Music, and Thomas House. Her music has been recorded by the New World, Albany, EROL, Liscio, FoxGlove, MMC, Capstone, Orion, Centaur, Neuma, Access, and Ohio Brassworks labels.

Her husband is the classical saxophonist John Sampen, and her daughter the classical/contemporary violinist Maria Sampen, both of whom have performed many of her works. Her son, producer, actor and rock guitarist, is David Sampen.

== Awards ==
She is the winner of a Kennedy Center Friedheim Award (third place, 1984) and a recipient of an American Academy of Arts and Letters Lifetime Achievement Award. She won a 1998 Cleveland Arts Prize for Music. She is also a 2011 Guggenheim Fellow.
