= Keitaro Harada =

Japanese conductor (born 1985)

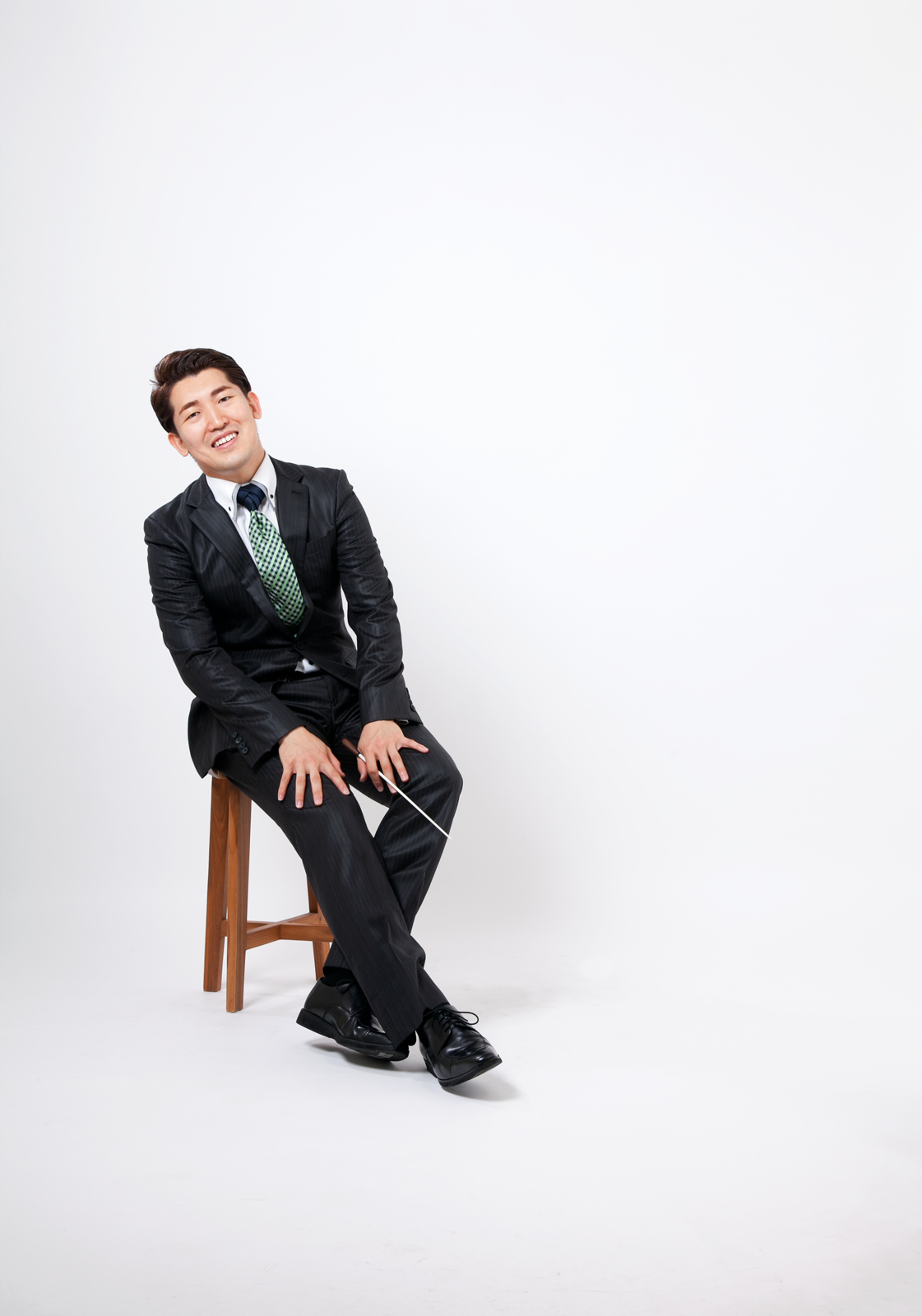

Background information
- Born: February 26, 1985 (age 41); Tokyo, Japan
- Genres: Classical, opera
- Occupation: Conductor

Keitaro Harada (Japanese: 原田慶太楼, born February 26, 1985) is a Japanese conductor and music and artistic director of Savannah Philharmonic, permanent conductor of the Tokyo Symphony Orchestra, and principal guest conductor and artistic partner for the Aichi Chamber Orchestra. In May 2024 he was announced as the incoming Music and Artistic Director Designate for the Dayton Philharmonic Orchestra. Harada is a former associate conductor of Cincinnati Symphony Orchestra Arizona Opera, Richmond Symphony Orchestra and principal guest conductor of Sierra Vista Symphony Orchestra. He has been music director and conductor of the Phoenix Youth Symphony, assistant conductor of Macon Symphony Orchestra. In 2013, he was featured in the Bruno Walter National Conductor Preview by the League of American Orchestras. In 2023, he received The Sir Georg Solti Conducting Award from the Solti Foundation U.S. On May 30, 2024, Harada was announced as the new Music and Artistic Director Designate for the Dayton Philharmonic Orchestra in Dayton, Ohio beginning with the 2024–2025 season, officially taking the helm as the orchestra's new leader beginning July 1, 2025.

== Biography ==
Born in Tokyo, Japan, Keitaro Harada first studied music at St. Mary's International School. At age 17, Harada attended the Interlochen Arts Academy and Arts Camp where he had his first public performance as a conductor, sharing the podium with Frederick Fennell. During his senior year at Interlochen, Harada performed on National Public Radio program From The Top, with pianist Christopher O'Riley. Harada's recording along with his interviews can be found on High School Music Textbook Music! Its Role and Importance in Our Lives, Chapter 7: Making Musical Decisions, published by Glencoe McGraw-Hill.

Harada began undergraduate at University of Illinois at Urbana-Champaign, as a saxophone student of Debra Richtmeyer and double majoring in Music History. As a conductor, he was the music director of the Broadway musical production of Cabaret at the university.

In the summers of 2004–2005, Harada attended conducting workshops in Saint Petersburg, Russia, where he studied with Sian Edwards, Adrian Gnam and Leonid Korchmar. After working with Adrian Gnam, Harada was appointed as apprentice conductor of Macon Symphony Orchestra in 2005. His title later changed to assistant conductor and he also became the conductor of Mercer/Macon Symphony Youth Orchestra. Harada enrolled at Mercer University in Macon, Georgia to complete his Bachelor of Music degree in saxophone and Master of Music degree in conducting.

Upon completion of his Master of Music in May 2008, he moved to Tucson, Arizona, to study with Thomas Cockrell as an inaugural recipient of the Rogers Institute for Orchestral and Opera Conducting Fellowship at University of Arizona. The fellowship included conducting the university ensembles and working with Tucson Symphony Orchestra and Arizona Opera. In addition, Harada was conductor for the Arizona Repertory Theatre where he led Into The Woods and The Music Man.

In the summer of 2009, Harada was invited to the inaugural season of the Castleton Festival, where he studied four Benjamin Britten operas at Lorin Maazel's estate. The following summer, James Levine and the members of the Boston Symphony Orchestra invited Harada as Seiji Ozawa Conducting Fellow at the Tanglewood Music Center. Harada assisted Christoph von Dohnányi in Richard Strauss' Ariadne auf Naxos and conducted the closing performance.

In May 2010, Harada was appointed music director and conductor of the Phoenix Youth Symphony. In June, as one of the ten featured guest for From The Top's 10th Anniversary, Harada was invited back to the show to perform again with Christopher O'Riley.

Harada completed his fellowship from the University of Arizona in December 2010 but has continued his work with the Arizona Opera as their assistant conductor. He is also the principal guest conductor of the Sierra Vista Symphony Orchestra in Arizona. He is the conductor of the Phoenix Youth Symphony and guest conducts at various places around the United States.

Harada made his operatic debut in May 2011 with the North Carolina Opera in a production of Benjamin Britten's The Turn of the Screw. In 2011, Harada attended Pacific Music Festival as a student in the Conducting Academy where he studied with Fabio Luisi.

Harada is married to Yuri Kurashima, fashion designer and professional tennis player.

== Awards and honors ==
- 2009 Castleton Festival – Invitation by Lorin Maazel
- 2009 IV Eduardo Mata International Conducting Competition – Semi-finalist
- 2010 NPR From The Top 10th Anniversary Guest
- 2010 Tanglewood Music Center – Seiji Ozawa Conducting Fellow
- 2011 Chicago Symphony Orchestra Solti/Muti Competition – Semi-finalist
- 2011 Pacific Music Festival Conducting Academy – Invitation by Fabio Luisi
- 2013 Bruno Walter National Conductor Preview by the League of American Orchestras.
- 2014 The Solti Foundation U.S. Career Assistance Award
- 2015 The Solti Foundation U.S. Career Assistance Award
- 2023 The Sir Georg Solti Conducting Award – The Sir Georg Solti Fellow

== Photographer ==
Harada is a professional photographer featured on monthly magazine BIGAKU in Japan.
