= Nobuya Sugawa =

Japanese saxophonist (born 1961)

- Born: July 25, 1961 (age 64); Saga, Japan
- Genres: Classical
- Occupations: Soloist, virtuoso, professor
- Instruments: Alto saxophone, soprano saxophone

Nobuya Sugawa (須川 展也, Sugawa Nobuya; born July 25, 1961) is a Japanese saxophonist.

== Career ==
He studied saxophone at Tokyo University of the Arts under Yuichi Omuro and won the top prize in the saxophone category of the 1st Japan Wind and Percussion Competition in 1984. In 1994, he received the Idemitsu Music Award and the Muramatsu Award in the wind division of the 51st Japan Music Competition.

He was the concertmaster of the Tokyo Kosei Wind Orchestra from 1989 through 2010. He has also performed with many international ensembles, including the BBC Philharmonic, Württembergische Philharmonie Reutlingen, Slovak Philharmonic Orchestra, and Eastman Wind Ensemble.

He has premiered pieces written for him by classical composers, including Fuzzy Bird Sonata and Cyber Bird Concerto by Takashi Yoshimatsu, Saxophone Concerto Esse in Anima by Akira Nishimura, and Saxophone Concerto by Edward Gregson.

He is a visiting professor at his alma mater Tokyo University of the Arts and has taught masterclasses.

He plays on a Yamaha YAS-875EXG saxophone.
