= Ronald Caravan =

American classical musician (born 1946)

- Born: November 20, 1946 (age 79); Pottsville, Pennsylvania, U.S.
- Genres: Classical
- Instruments: Clarinet, saxophone

Ronald Caravan (born November 20, 1946) is an American classical musician. He is a clarinetist, saxophonist, teacher, composer, and arranger.

== Early life and education ==
Caravan was born in Pottsville, Pennsylvania. He earned a Master of Arts in music theory in 1973 and the Doctor of Musical Arts (DMA) in music education in 1974 from the Eastman School of Music. He also earned the performer's certificate on clarinet from the Eastman School (1974).

== Career ==
Most of Caravan's teaching career has been with the faculty of the Setnor School of Music at Syracuse University from 1980 to 2015, where he taught clarinet and saxophone and conducted the Syracuse University Saxophone Ensemble.

Caravan's published teaching materials include Preliminary Exercises & Etudes in Contemporary Techniques for Clarinet (Ethos Publications, 1979) and Preliminary Exercises & Etudes in Contemporary Techniques for Saxophone (Dorn Publications, 1980), both derived from his doctoral dissertation Extensions of Technique for Clarinet and Saxophone (1974), dealing with the study of multiphonics, quarter tones, and timbre variation. Some of his most noteworthy compositions for clarinet or saxophone use these extended techniques although several of his more conservative (and tonal) pieces for the single-reed instruments have gained wide popularity, especially his four sonatas for soprano (1984), baritone (1989), alto (2004), and tenor (2007) saxophones, which are based on traditional modes or variants thereof.

Caravan produces a line of saxophone mouthpieces generally based on the original mouthpiece design of Adolphe Sax, the instrument's inventor. These are marketed under the name Caravan Mouthpieces, which also includes a symphonic clarinet mouthpiece.

In addition to performing solo and chamber-music recitals on both clarinet and saxophone throughout his career, he has performed regularly with the Syracuse Symphony Orchestra (more recently named Symphoria) on both clarinet and saxophone. His saxophone chamber experience includes the Aeolian Saxophone Quartet and Saxophone Sinfonia, including concerts at the 1979 World Saxophone Congress and at Alice Tully Hall (1982).
