= Joseph Lulloff =

American saxophonist and educator (born 1960)

Joseph Lulloff (born 1960) is an American saxophonist and educator.

Lulloff began playing saxophone at age 7, after switching from clarinet, which a doctor had suggested he play to help with his asthma. In later years, influenced by Eugene Rousseau clinics, Lulloff was inspired to study saxophone in college, attending Michigan State University and the University of Wisconsin–Milwaukee. After graduating, he performed with the Milwaukee Symphony Orchestra, Minnesota Orchestra, and The Cleveland Orchestra. He has toured with The Cleveland Orchestra performing Ingolf Dahls's Saxophone Concerto. He serves as principal with the Saint Louis Symphony Orchestra, Flint Symphony Orchestra, and the Grand Rapids Symphony.

Lulloff currently is professor of saxophone and area chair of woodwinds at Michigan State University, and continues to perform in various engagements. Prior to this, he served as the professor of saxophone at the University of Illinois.
