= Al Gallodoro =

American jazz clarinetist and saxophonist

- Born: Alfred J. Gallodoro; June 20, 1913
- Origin: Chicago, Illinois, United States
- Died: October 4, 2008 (aged 95) Oneonta, New York, United States
- Genres: Jazz
- Occupation: Musician
- Instruments: alto saxophone, clarinet, bass clarinet
- Years active: 1920's–2008
- Labels: Golden Rooster, Basta, Chmusic Productions
- Formerly of: the Paul Whiteman orchestra NBC Symphony Orchestra
- Website: http://www.algallodoro.com/

Alfred J. Gallodoro, (June 20, 1913 – October 4, 2008) was an American jazz clarinetist and saxophonist, who performed from the 1920s up until his death. He is notable for having played lead alto sax with the Paul Whiteman Orchestra and bass clarinet for 12 years with the NBC Symphony Orchestra under Arturo Toscanini. Bandleader Jimmy Dorsey praised him as "the best sax player who ever lived."

== Early years ==
Gallodoro was born to a Chicago steelworker, but moved with his family to Birmingham, Alabama when he was five years old. About the same time his father began teaching him clarinet on the "Albert Method". Devoting himself to practice, Gallodoro earned a spot with Romeo and His Juliets and made his first stage appearance at Birmingham's Lyric Theatre in 1926. The next summer he toured the Gulf Coast with Birmingham banjo player George Evans and decided to settle in New Orleans, Louisiana, where his family joined him.

After six years of playing nightclubs, speakeasies and vaudeville shows at the Orpheum Theater, Gallodoro moved to New York City and worked in radio bands. In 1933 he briefly joined Isham Jones' big band, making one record session with it. In 1936 he was hired to play lead alto saxophone in Paul Whiteman's orchestra, among the most popular performing groups of the era. After that group disbanded in 1940 he was hired to play bass clarinet in the NBC Symphony Orchestra under Arturo Toscanini. Among his credits is the famed opening clarinet glissando from the 1945 Warner Brothers film Rhapsody in Blue. He claimed to have performed that particular piece over 10,000 times in his career, more than any other person.

== Radio and Television ==
In 1947 Gallodoro's former bandleader invited him to join him as a live performer on New York's WJZ radio station. Gallodoro contributed countless saxophone solos to that station's programs over two decades and continued to do live radio work throughout his life. Known for effortlessly transitioning from classical to jazz idioms and for a clean and virtuosic style, Gallodoro was much in demand as a session recording artist. Composer Ferde Grofé tailored his Gallodoro's Serenade for Saxophone and Piano for him in 1958, which he recorded in 2004 (Grofe and Gershwin: Symphonic Jazz). He performed on screen as a street musician in the 1974 film The Godfather, Part II. Al played the alto sax and clarinet with John Dertinger (John Anthony Orchestras) in private for hire gigs: weddings, engagement parties, and more during the 1970's. Three piece, four piece, or five piece bands would entertain all who were there. Al also taught music at Nassau Community College in 1980 before moving upstate.

== Teaching career ==
In 1981 Gallodoro moved to Oneonta, New York and began working as an instructor at Hartwick College. Not long after moving to Oneonta, Al joined The Catskill Stompers and played with them for almost two decades. His wife, Mary died in Oneonta in 1985. He continued to perform and record, often with pianist, manager and friend JoAnn Chmielowski. He issued several CDs of new and old recordings on his own Golden Rooster Records with the help of his producer and grandson, Kevin Wood. His final performance was on September 20, 2008, at the Corning Jazz and Harvest Festival in Corning, New York.

One of his pupils was Arthur Romano.

== Discography ==
- an Al Gallodoro concert (c.1948) Manor Records album C-1 (9006-9008) 78 rpm
- Alfred Gallodoro, Stuyvesant String Quartet–Brahms Quintet For Clarinet And Strings, Opus 115 Concert Hall Society CHC 1004
- The Immortal Freddy Gardner And Al Gallodoro 1954 Columbia – CL 623 LP
- The Many Sides of Al Gallodoro (1998) Golden Rooster Records
- Out of Nowhere (1999) Basta Records
- Caffe Lena Live (2003) Golden Rooster Records
- Sarasota Saxes (2003) Golden Rooster Records
- Daybreak - Lyrical Jazz (2006) Golden Rooster Records/Chmusic Productions
- Infinite Gallodoro. (2006). Golden Rooster Records/Chmusic Productions
- Saxophone Contrasts, For your listening pleasure (2006) Golden Rooster Records/Chmusic Productions
- Grofe and Gershwin: Symphonic Jazz (2006) Harmonia Mundi
- A Moment in Time, Birmingham Live, 1969 (2008) Golden Rooster Records/Chmusic Productions
- Gershwin By Grofe (2010) Harmonia Mundi
- Gallodoro Al Gallodoro, unidentified assisting artists (ca. 1960) Merri 5901 (LP)
- Saxophone Contrasts Al Gallodoro and his orchestra (1951) Columbia CL 6188 (10-inch LP)
