= Frederick Hemke =

American musician (1935–2019)

Fred LeRoy Hemke Jr.
- Born: Fred LeRoy Hemke Jr. July 11, 1935; Milwaukee, Wisconsin, U.S.
- Died: April 17, 2019 (aged 83)
- Genres: Classical
- Occupations: Saxophonist; University professor
- Instrument: Saxophone
- Years active: 1962–2019
- Website: www.fredericklhemke.com/home.htm

Frederick L. Hemke (né Fred LeRoy Hemke Jr.; July 11, 1935 – April 17, 2019) was an American virtuoso classical saxophonist and influential professor of saxophone at Northwestern University. Hemke helped increase the popularity of classical saxophone, particularly among leading American composers, and raised recognition of the classical saxophone in solo, chamber, and major orchestral repertoire throughout the world. Throughout his career, Hemke built American saxophone repertoire through many composers including Muczynski, Creston, Stein, Heiden, and Karlins.

For half a century (1962 - 2012), Hemke was a full-time faculty member at Northwestern University's Bienen School of Music. In 2002, he was named Associate Dean Emeritus of the school. He retired in 2012.

Journalist and author Michael Segell, in his 2005 book, The Devil's Horn, called Hemke "The Dean of Saxophone Education in America."

Hemke died April 17, 2019.

== Formal education ==
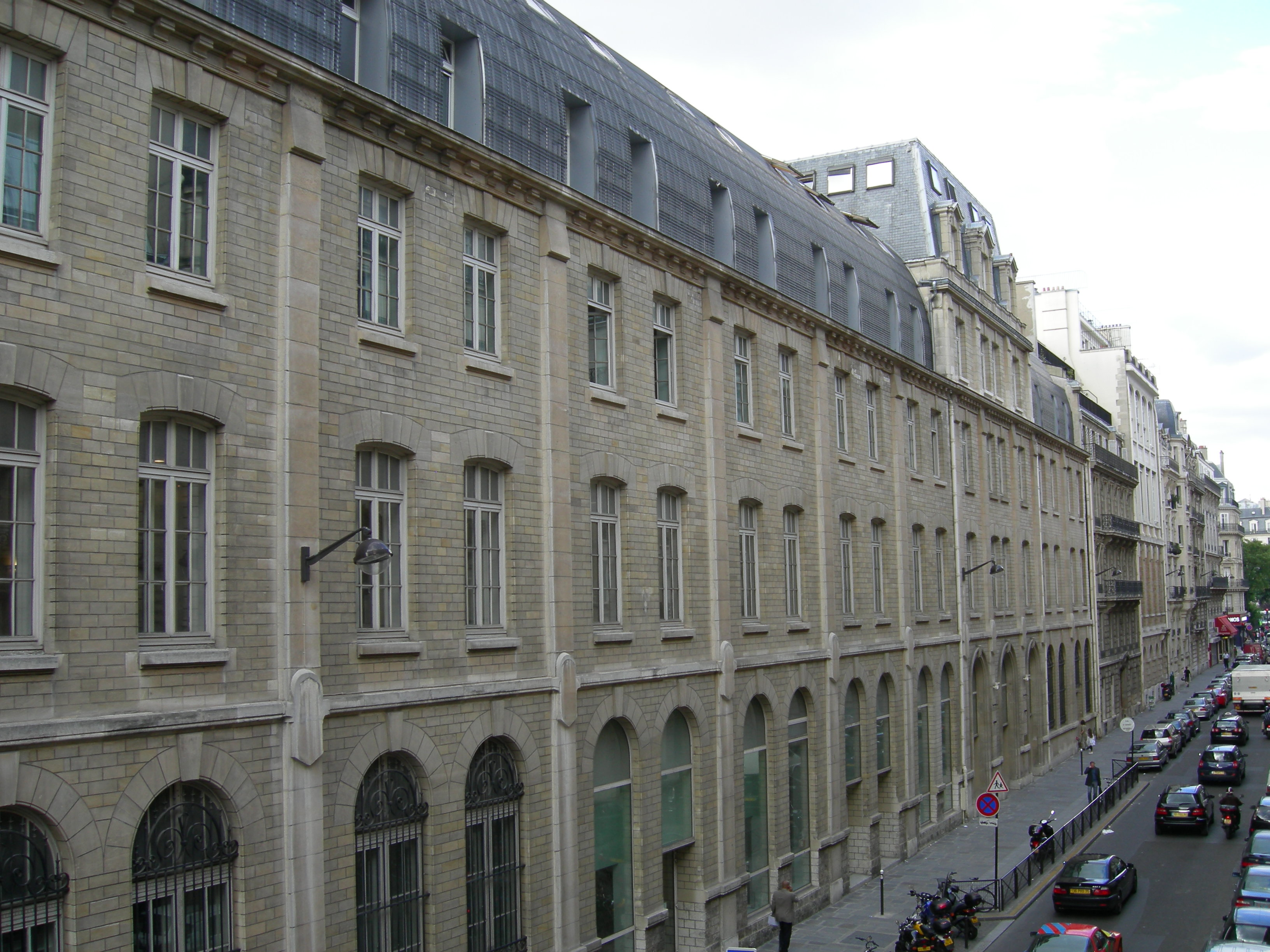
Paris Conservatory (2007)

From 1955 to 1956, Hemke studied saxophone with Marcel Mule at the Paris Conservatoire National de Musique et de Declamation, earning in 1956 the Premier Prix diploma. (Note: A First Prize from the Paris Conservatory, in any musical discipline, is an internationally recognized distinction. A First Prize in saxophone from the Paris Conservatory under Marcel Mule holds a unique distinction because of Mule's unprecedented level of virtuosity, his influence in building the saxophone family of instruments in orchestral repertoire, and his role in developing a new generation of highly influential performing artists.Mule's leverage from his American First Prize protégé, Hemke, greatly helped transform classical saxophone in America, a country that led the world in the use of saxophones. When Hemke began teaching saxophone in 1962 at Northwestern University, few American universities and conservatories had full-time saxophone-only faculty members. The role was typically filled by other orchestral woodwind experts who doubled on saxophone. By 1970, many reputable music institutions of higher learning had a dedicated saxophone professor. As of 2014, most major universities, and all comprehensive music institutions of higher learning, have a least one dedicated saxophone instructor.) Hemke holds the distinction of being the first American saxophonist to earn a Premier Prix diploma from the Paris Conservatory. In 1958, Hemke earned a Bachelor of Science degree in music education from University of Wisconsin–Milwaukee. In 1962, he earned a Master of Music degree from the Eastman School of Music. In 1975, Hemke earned a D.M.A. degree from the University of Wisconsin–Madison.

In primary and secondary school, until the start of college, Hemke studied saxophone with Eddie Schmidt, a band director in Milwaukee, and a close friend of Ralph Joseph Hermann (1914–1994) — musician, composer, songwriter, and music publisher. Hemke was highly influenced by Schmidt's recording of Marcel Mule — and also of his recordings of Al Gallodoro, and Freddy Gardner. At the University of Wisconsin-Milwaukee, Hemke studied with Jay Morton, teacher of woodwinds. Hemke did not have a formal saxophone teacher at Eastman, but while there, studied reeds with clarinetist Stanley Hasty (1920–2011), flute repertoire with Joseph Mariano (1911–2007), and oboe repertoire with Robert Sprenkle (1914–1988).

== Teaching career ==
Hemke taught saxophone at Northwestern's School of Music for fifty years. He began in 1962 as a teaching associate. In 1964 he became an assistant professor and was appointed chairman of the newly formed Winds and Percussion Instruments Department. In 1967 Hemke was elevated to associate professor; on September 1, 1975, Full Professor; and on September 1, 1991, chairman of the Department of Music Performance Studies at the School of Music. Hemke served as senior associate dean for administration in the School of Music from 1995 to 2001. In 2002, Hemke was named the Louis and Elsie Snydacker Eckstein Professor of Music and also named Associate Dean Emeritus of the School of Music. He retired from full-time teaching in 2012.

As a music educator in higher education, Hemke taught hundreds of saxophonists, many of whom have flourished as performing artists and music educators of international rank. From 2013 until his death, Hemke served as artistic director and taught during summers at the Frederick L. Hemke Saxophone Institute, located at Snow Pond Center for the Arts in Sidney, ME.

== Other positions ==
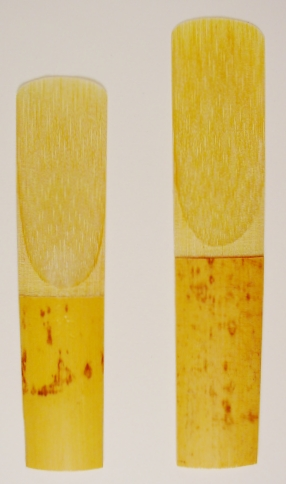
Frederick L. Hemke Reeds

Hemke was well known as the designer of a line of reeds which bear the trademark "Frederick L. Hemke Reeds." D'Addario began making the brand in 1982. Hemke was an artist-clinician for The Selmer Company, (Note: H. & A. Selmer, Inc., and its successor, The Selmer Corporation, based in Elkhart, Indiana, has not been owned by Henri Selmer Paris since 1927. But in the North American market, H. & A. Selmer assembles and distributes Henri Selmer Paris instruments manufactured in France. H. & A. Selmer, Inc. — its successors and affiliates — are now part of Conn-Selmer.) the North American distributor of saxophones made in France by the Paris firm, Henri Selmer Paris. In 1979 Hemke was host for the Sixth World Saxophone Congress held at Northwestern University, Evanston, Illinois.

== Performing career ==
Hemke was known worldwide as one of the great classical saxophonists. He performed extensively as a solo artist, conducted master classes and delivered lectures in the United States, Canada, Scandinavia, and the Far East. He also performed with the Chicago Symphony Orchestra and many other orchestras.

Hemke premiered several works for saxophone including Allan Pettersson's Symphony No. 16 (February 24, 1983) and James Di Pasquale's Sonata for tenor saxophone. Di Pasquale, a prolific composer, had studied saxophone with Hemke and Sigurd Rascher.

Selected performances

- Hemke made his New York debut on April 16, 1962 at the Town Hall, a storied concert venue that had its first-ever classical saxophone performance on February 5, 1937 — by Cecil Leeson. Hemke performed compositions by Pascal, Lantier, Rueff, Hartley, and Stein and arrangements by Mule of Bach and Leclair.
- Premier, February 27, 2014, Augusta Read Thomas, Hemke Concerto, Prisms of Light, for solo alto saxophone and orchestra
1. "Illuminations" (sample at 1:14 on YouTube)
2. "Sunrise Ballad"
3. "Chasing Radiance"
4. "Solar Rings"

Hemke, saxophone, with the New Haven Symphony Orchestra, William Boughton conducting
Recorded at Woolsey Hall, New Haven, Connecticut, February 27, 2014
Commissioned as a retirement gift to Fred Hemke by current and former students; the composer, Thomas, had been Hemke's colleague at Northwestern
From the album, A Portrait of Augusta Read Thomas, Nimbus Records (CD) (2014); OCLC 889352260

== Advocacy for B♭ tenor saxophone ==
Among the instruments in a traditional modern saxophone quartet — B♭ soprano, E♭ alto, B♭ tenor, and E♭ baritone saxophone — classical solos were, and still are, mostly written for the soprano and the alto. Hemke decided to focus on the tenor as a classical solo instrument, as evidenced by the release of his 1971 solo album Music for Tenor Saxophone.

In orchestral music, the tenor saxophone is one of three saxophones heard in Ravel's Boléro — they were originally scored for two players, one on E♭ sopranino and the other alternating between the tenor and the soprano as required. Recordings by tenor saxophone virtuoso James Houlik and others notwithstanding, classical tenor saxophone music is still a very small portion of classical saxophone repertoire and discography.

== Selected discography ==
Solo recordings

- Contest Music for Saxophone, Lapider Records M 249-04, distributed by H. & A. Selmer, Elkhart (LP) (1962) (Note: The imprint date is inferred from an announcement in the Music Educators Journal, April May 1963, pg. 137; ISSN 0027-4321)

OCLC 70304864 (stereo) (LP)
OCLC 34006752 (mono) (cassette)
OCLC 9439934 (mono) (LP)
OCLC 82478166 (mono) (LP)
OCLC 682038662 (LP)
OCLC 3249596 (LP)
James Jacobs Edmonds (1931–2002), piano
Hemke performed on a Selmer Mark VI

Side 1

Matrix N° XCTV-87627 (Note: The alpha matrix prefix "XCTV" was an imprint of Columbia Custom Records of Columbia Records. The prefix was designated for LP mono. The matrix numbers XCTV-87627 (side A) and XCTV-87628 (side B) were handwritten on the stamper and appear in the runout areas of both sides of this particular pressing.) (mono)
Matrix N° RG 576A (stereo)

1. Chanson et Passepied, Op. 16, by Jeanine Rueff, Leduc (©1951); OCLC 3643353, 70350851
2. Sicilienne, by Pierre Lantier, Leduc (©1944); OCLC 2513787, 220710420, 494480544
3. Chant Corse, by Henri Tomasi, Leduc (©1932); OCLC 1693762, 65054912, 60574040, OCLC 2788030
4. Elegie, by Hermann Reutter, Leduc (©1957); OCLC 4319498, 17711417
5. Villageoise, by Marcel Bitsch, Leduc (©1953); OCLC 2520728, 659257906
6. Suite, by Paul Bonneau, Leduc (©1944); OCLC 1042470
  3. "Plainte"
  4. "Espieglerie"
7. Variations on a Theme by Claude Le Jeune, by Franz Tournier (1923–2010), Leduc (©1955); OCLC 4245478, 222890465
8. Cantilena et Danse, by Denis Joly (fr), Leduc (©1949); OCLC 4257200, 77295149
Side 2

Matrix N° XCTV-87628 (mono)
Matrix N° RG 576A (stereo)

9. An Abstract, by David Ward, (Note: David Ward, born 1936, earned a Bachelor of Music from Oklahoma City University, and Master of Music (1960) and Doctor of Musical Arts (1966) from the Eastman School of Music.) Southern Music Co. (©1963); OCLC 271801728, 4026579, 878470044
10. Cantilena, by Warren Benson, Boosey & Hawkes (©1954); OCLC 70345845, 5910326, 743342657
11. Petite Suite, by Walter Hartley, Fema Music Publications (©1962); OCLC 461584790, 3958081
12. Violin Sonata No. 2, Op.1, by Jean-Marie Leclair
  3. "Gigue," arr. Marcel Mule
    Leduc (©1951); OCLC 80882751, 4700064
    See: Scores at the International Music Score Library Project
13. Prelude to Cantata No. 12, by Bach, arr. by Sigurd Raschèr, Chappell (©1938); OCLC 1881486, 33309682
  3. "Weinen"
  4. "Klagen"
  5. "Sorgen"
  6. "Zagen"
14. Orchestral Suite No. 3, BWV 1068, by J.S. Bach
  3. "Gavottes I & II", arr. by Marcel Mule
    Leduc (©1939); OCLC 4451340
    See: Scores at the International Music Score Library Project
15. Adagio, by Arcangelo Corelli, arr. by Marcel Mule, Leduc (©1939); OCLC 7301376
16. Le Fete du Village, by François-Joseph Gossec, arr. by Marcel Mule, Leduc (©1937); OCLC 317456709

- Music for Tenor Saxophone, Brewster Records (Note: Brewster Records was a label with a mailing address of 1822 Monroe Street, Evanston, Illinois. It was founded in 1967 by Charles Brewster Hawes, PhD (born 1945), who was also its chief engineer. Other engineers included James S. Hill and Robert E. Diehl. All three were saxophone students at Northwestern University) BR 1204 (LP) (1971); OCLC 5111369

Milton Lewis Granger (born 1947), piano
Album cover art: Fred Hemke
Notes by Charles (Chuck) Brewster Hawes, PhD (born 1945)

1. Sonata, for tenor saxophone and piano, by James Di Pasquale
2. A Ballad in Time and Space, by William Duckworth
3. Poem, for tenor saxophone and piano, by Walter Hartley
4. Music for Tenor Saxophone and Piano, by Martin William Karlins
- The American Saxophone, Brewster Records BR 1203 (LP) (1971); OCLC 4256573

Milton Lewis Granger (born 1947), piano
Album cover art: Fred Hemke
Notes by Alan Burrage Stout (born 1932)

1. Concerto, for alto saxophone, by Ingolf Dahl
2. Farewell, by Warren Benson
3. Concerto, for alto saxophone, Karel Husa
4. Aeolian Song, by Warren Benson
- Music for Tenor Saxophone (1971) and The American Saxophone (1971) was

Re-issued as a compilation under the title:
The American Saxophone, EnF Records (Note: The acronym EnF (for EnF Records) reflects the initials of the first names of Elizabeth and Fred. Elizabeth is Fred's daughter.) 1203-2 (CD) (2006); OCLC 111103801

- Simple Gifts, EnF Records (CD) (2006); OCLC 64770800

Douglas Cleveland, organ
Recorded at Alice Miller Chapel, Northwestern University on the Æolian-Skinner Organ and at Trinity United Methodist Church, Wilmette, Illinois, on the 2001 Reuter Organ

- Fascinating Rhythm, Sins Of My Old Age, EnF Records (CD) (2010); OCLC 696220898

The Music of George Gershwin
Hemke, Alto Saxophone
Figard String Quintet: Tracy Figard, violin; Catherine Price, violin; Kristin Figard, viola; Sam Norlund, cello; Douglas Nestler, double bass
Notes by Jonah L. Blum (born 1976) (in English) and Hemke
Cover art by Hemke

- Premier, February 27, 2014, Augusta Read Thomas, Hemke Concerto, Prisms of Light, for solo alto saxophone and orchestra
1. "Illuminations" (sample at 1:14 on YouTube)
2. "Sunrise Ballad"
3. "Chasing Radiance"
4. "Solar Rings"

Hemke, saxophone, with the New Haven Symphony Orchestra, William Boughton, conducting
Recorded at Woolsey Hall, New Haven, Connecticut, February 27, 2014
Commissioned as a retirement gift to Fred Hemke by current and former students; the composer, Thomas, had been Hemke's colleague at Northwestern
From the album, A Portrait of Augusta Read Thomas, Nimbus Records (CD) (2014); OCLC 889352260

Ensemble recordings

Hemke has recorded with the Eastman Wind Ensemble, and The University of Chicago Contemporary Chamber Players.

- Symphony No. 16, by Allan Pettersson, Stockholm Philharmonic Orchestra, Yuri Ahronovitch conducting, Swedish Society Discofil (LP) (1985); OCLC 13762831 and (CD) (1994) OCLC 45586363

Recorded at the Stockholm Concert Hall, October 17 & 18, 1984 (Note: From the liner notes for the CD cataloged under OCLC 45586363.)

- Winds of Change – American Music for Wind Ensemble From the 1950s to the 1970s, New World Records NW-211 (LP) (1977); OCLC 276861490, 3213973, 179723476, OCLC 221635446, 855950059

Northwestern University Wind Ensemble, John Philip Paynter (1928–1996) (nl) conducting
Recorded November 1976
4th work: Concerto for Saxophone and Orchestra of Wind Instruments, by Ross Lee Finney, Hemke, alto saxophone

- Music by Warren Benson, CRI Records SD-433 & SD 418 (LP) (1981); OCLC 7584165, 604060123, 317743723

Hemke, E♭ alto saxophone
With the Kronos Quartet: David Harrington, violin; John Sherba, violin; Hank Dutt, viola; Joan Jeanrenaud, cello
Recorded November 27, 1978, Kresge Recording Studios, Eastman School of Music
First work: The Dream Net, quintet for saxophone and string quartet, commissioned by Hemke

1. "Slow" (audio)
2. "Quick" (audio)
3. "Flexing" (audio)

- Incantations (in four movements), by Ralph Shapey, CRI Records 232 (LP) (1969); OCLC 830762, 80385473, 19685002, OCLC 221615298

Notes by Carter Harman
For soprano, violoncello, trumpet, E♭ alto saxophone, French horn, piano, tympani, cymbals, tomtoms, irons, and gongs
Bethany Beardslee, soprano, Contemporary Chamber Players of the University of Chicago
Ralph Shapey conducting
Re-released CRI Records (CD) (1995); OCLC 33428323
Re-released CRI Records (CD) (2007); OCLC 793773808, 842067254

- Concerto for Saxophone and Winds by Paul Creston, Interlochen Arts Academy Records (1978)

Interlochen Arts Academy Wind Ensemble, Dennis L. Johnson (born 1946) conducting
33rd Annual Midwestern Conference on School Vocal and Instrumental Music
Performed live, January 21, 1978, Hill Auditorium, University of Michigan, Ann Arbor

2. "Meditative"
3. "Rhythmic"

- Concerto for Saxophone and Wind Orchestra by Ingolf Dahl, University of Wisconsin–Madison Records (1972); OCLC 49941229

University of Wisconsin–Madison Wind Ensemble, (H. Robert Reynolds) conducting

Chicago Symphony Orchestra

- Pictures at an Exhibition, by Mussorgsky, orchestrated by Ravel, Ozawa conducting (1968); OCLC 10201160

"The Old Castle" on YouTube

- L'Arlésienne Suites Nos. 1 and 2, by Bizet, RCA Red Seal LSC-2939 (LP) (1967); OCLC 8454572, 226408757, 833224471

Jean Martinon conducting
Re-released RCA Camden Classics Victrola CCV 5011 (LP) (1971)
Re-released RCA VICS 1593 (LP) (1971); OCLC 6033704, 221592686
Re-released RCA (LP) (1977); OCLC 4310870
Re-released RCA LPS 9845 (LP)

- Age of Gold (ballet suite), by Shostakovich, RCA Red Seal GL 42916 (LP) (1968); OCLC 16697745

Stokowski conducting
Recorded February 20–21, 1968, Medinah Temple, Chicago
Re-released RCA Red Seal LSC 3133 (LP) (1970); OCLC 79804294, 4663689
Re-released RCA Red Seal (LP) (1975); OCLC 11646599
Re-released RCA Red Seal (LP) (1979); OCLC 16697745
Re-released RCA Red Seal (CD) (1997); OCLC 39096777
Also re-released with several various compilations

- Boléro, by Ravel, Quintessence PMC 1017 (1977); OCLC 4624235, 77650271

Martinon conducting

- Boléro, by Ravel, Decca Matrix N° ZAL 14720 (Note: The alpha matrix prefix "ZAL" indicates that the record is a London-based Decca 12-inch 33-1/3 rpm stereo record ("Decca/London Phase Four Recordings — Part V: Decoding the Inner Groove Information," The Absolute Sound, Vol. 11, No. 42, July–August 1986, pps. 181, 182; ISSN 0097-1138)) (LP)

Solti conducting
Recorded May 1976, Medinah Temple, Chicago
Original release Decca (1977)
Original release London Records (LP) (1977); OCLC 869375711
Re-released Decca (CD) (1996); OCLC 23366204
Boléro on YouTube
Re-released Universal Classics (2003); OCLC 52087462
Re-released Deutsche Grammophon (2003); OCLC 178786394
Boléro on YouTube and orchestral scores of Boléro at: Scores at the International Music Score Library Project

- Final Alice, by Del Tredici, Decca, London (LP) (1981); OCLC 7840194, 638614581

Barbara Hendricks, soprano; Fred Hemke, Robert Black, soprano saxophones; Fred Spector, mandolin; Frederic Chrislip, tenor banjo; Herman Troppe, accordion; Solti conducting
Recorded twice. Once in 1976 after World Premier and again 1978, after second live performance series before Solti and his exacting standards would allow release. Medinah Temple, Chicago
Re-released on Decca Eloquence 442 995, Australia (CD) (2008); OCLC 226380109

== Selected publications ==
Educational publications

- The Early History of the Saxophone (DMA dissertation), by Hemke, University of Wisconsin (1975); OCLC 19033726 (all editions), OCLC 65652818 (all editions)

The dissertation explores in depth the saxophone's history and gradual acceptance in the realm of symphonic music

- On Reading Music: An Information Processing Analysis, by Gilbert Koreb Krulee (born 1924) & Hemke (1980); OCLC 30499976

The Selmer Series, Elkhart, Indiana

- "Teacher's Guide to the Saxophone," by Hemke, Elkhart, Indiana: Selmer (1977); OCLC 6549827
- The Orchestral Saxophone, by Hemke & Walker L Smith, Elkhart, Indiana: Selmer (1975); OCLC 9051582
- A Comprehensive Listing of Saxophone Literature, by Hemke, Elkhart, Indiana: Selmer (1975); OCLC 2987346

Commissions and dedications

- "Music for Tenor Saxophone and Piano," by M. William Karlins (1969, ©1972); OCLC 1951589, 70345764
- Symphony No. 16, for orchestra with bravura alto saxophone, by Allan Pettersson, commissioned by Hemke (1979, ©1989); OCLC 36855336
- The Dream Net, 1974, revised 1978, by Warren Benson, commissioned by Hemke, dedicated to Alec Wilder, premiered by Hemke May 23, 1975, with the Eckstein Quartet, Lutken Hall, Northwestern University; OCLC 9579996
- "Wind Rose", by Warren Benson (1966), commissioned by Hemke and the Northwestern University Saxophone, dedicated to Hemke and the Northwestern University Saxophone Quartet on their tour of Asia, Spring, 1966; OCLC 2992504, 157036679, 435949517
- Little Suite, by Walter Hartley, for Hemke, for baritone saxophone and piano (1974); OCLC 51963415, 5377209
- 5 Etudes for Alto Saxophone, by Robert Lemay (fr), Courlay: Éditions Fuzeau

2000; OCLC 63046841
Revised 2006; OCLC 76879383, 76879383, 658778115, OCLC 878432573, 658778115, 658778164, OCLC 76879388
Commissioned by Jean-François Guay
Homage to Marcel Mule, Jean-Marie Londeix, Eugene Rousseau, Fred Hemke, Daniel Deffayet
Funded in part by the Conseil des arts et des lettres du Québec

- Episode, for saxophone quartet, by Jared Tozier Spears (born 1936), commissioned by Hemke (1969); OCLC 28207501
- Symphony for Saxophone and Wind Band, by Gerald Eugene Kemner (1932–2006) (composed around 1962 for Hemke)

Music editions

- Hemke has edited works for saxophone solos and saxophone ensembles, twenty-five of which are part of the Frederick Hemke Saxophone Series published by the Southern Music Company. (Note: Southern Music Company, the former San Antonio based sheet music retailer and wholesaler founded in 1937, sold its sheet music assets in 2012 to Lauren Keiser Music Publishing of Maryland Heights, Missouri, and became known as Southern Music LLC. The sheet music is published and distributed by the Hal Leonard Corporation.)

== Awards and honors ==
1956	Premiere Prix du Saxophone, Paris Conservatory; Hemke was the first American to win a First Prize from the Conservatory; his achievement inspired other American saxophonist to work towards First Prize diplomas at the Paris Conservatory, and other well-known European conservatories known for classical saxophone, including the Royal Conservatory of Brussels
1976–1978	Founding coordinator of the North American Saxophone Alliance; later awarded Honorary Life Membership
1999–2001	Distinguished Service to Music Medal, Kappa Kappa Psi, for Instrumental Music Education
2004	Appointed the Charles Deering McCormick Professor of Teaching Excellence at Northwestern University
2013	Centerstage Lifetime Achievement Award, Conn-Selmer
2013	Honorary Alumni Award, Augustana College, Rock Island, Illinois

== Influence on saxophone design ==
Hemke was a primary design consultant for the S-80 mouthpiece manufactured by Henri Selmer Paris, and he used a custom version of it on alto saxophone. The mouthpiece is metal with a square chamber.

He was also a design consultant for the Selmer Mark VII E♭ alto and B♭ tenor saxophones, introduced in 1974.

== Audio samples and videography ==
- Symphony No. 16 on YouTube, by Allan Pettersson

Stockholm Philharmonic Orchestra, Yuri Ahronovitch conducting, Swedish Society Discofil (1994); OCLC 45586363

- Coefficient on YouTube, by Claudio Gabriele (composed 2005)

For 12 saxophones
North American premier
Northwestern University Saxophone Ensemble, Hemke conducting

- Illustration Analytique Supergelatineuse on YouTube, by Claudio Gabriele (composed 2011)

For 9 saxophones
World premiere, 2008, Pick-Steiger Concert Hall, Evanston, Illinois
Northwestern University Saxophone Ensemble, Hemke conducting

Hemke Legacy Tribute: May 29 – June 3, 2012, Northwestern University

- Hemke's final performance at Northwestern University on YouTube

7:30 pm, May 31, 2012, Pick-Staiger Concert Hall, Northwestern University
Songs by Gershwin, arranged by Jonah L. Blum (born 1976)
Northwestern University Chamber Orchestra, Robert Hasty conducting
Scenes from Porgy and Bess

1. "Summertime" (prologue on YouTube)
2. "Bess, You Is My Woman Now" (at 2:30 on YouTube)
3. "I Got Plenty o' Nuttin' " (at 4:42 on YouTube)
4. "Gone, Gone, Gone" (at 6:40 on YouTube)
5. "I Loves You, Porgy" (at 9:00 on YouTube)
6. "Summertime" (epilogue at 11:49 on YouTube)

- Northwestern University Hymn (alma mater), "Hail to Thee Northwestern" on YouTube

(Brahms's Variations on the St. Anthony Chorale by Haydn)
Arranged by Gary S. Bricault (born 1952) at the request of Fred Hemke
Northwestern University Alumni Saxo Orchestra, Stephen Alltop conducting
Performed June 3, 2012, at Northwestern University
105 saxophones: 3 E♭ sopraninos, 23 B♭ sopranos, 35 E♭ altos, 25 B♭ tenors, 12 E♭ baritones, 6 B♭ basses, and 1 E♭ contra bass tubax (Note: The E♭ contrabass tubax, made by Benedikt Eppelsheim Instruments in Munich, is pitched one octave lower than a standard E♭ baritone saxophone)

- My Teacher, the Fred Hemke Legacy on YouTube, Eric Howell Music (DVD) (2012); OCLC 853456426

Academic offices
Preceded by Cecil Leeson	Full-time faculty, saxophone Bienen School of Music; Northwestern University; 1962–2012	Succeeded by Timothy McAllister
