= Claude Delangle =

French classical saxophonist

Claude Delangle (born 1957) is a French classical saxophonist who taught saxophone at the National Superior Conservatory of Music of Paris from 1988 until 2025. He played in "Quatuor Adolphe Sax Paris" with Jacques Baguet, Bruno Totaro and Jean-Paul Fouchécourt. He was very implicated during the 1980s in developing the contemporary repertory of all the saxophone's family. His influences include Luciano Berio, Betsy Jolas and Japanese music. He studied Saxophone with Serge Bichon at the conservatory of Lyon and Daniel Deffayet in Paris.

== Discography ==
- Musique française pour saxophone with Quatuor Adolphe Sax Paris, Odile Catelin-Delangle et Pierre-Yves Arteau (1986).
- Quatuor de Hugues Dufourt with ensemble Fa direction Dominique My (1996).
- THE HISTORIC SAXOPHONE CD BIS 1270
- A SAXOPHONE FOR A LADY CD BIS 1020 (dedicated to Elisa Hall of Boston).
- THE JAPANESE SAXOPHONE CD BIS 890
- Claude DEBUSSY CD ERATO

Rhapsodie pour orchestre et saxophone Orchestre Philharmonique de Monte-Carlo, Direction : Armin Jordan.

- And more than ten others.
