= Donald Sinta =

American classical saxophonist (b.1937)

Donald J. Sinta (born June 16, 1937 in Detroit, Michigan) is an American classical saxophonist, educator, and administrator. He earned a Master of Music degree in saxophone performance from the University of Michigan in 1962. In 1969, he was the first elected chair of the World Saxophone Congress.

== Performing career ==
Donald Sinta specializes in contemporary music for the saxophone. He has gained prominence as an interpreter of modern music, is known for his technical abilities as well as his musical interpretation, and is highly regarded for his incorporation of the orchestral string tradition into the language of modern concert saxophone. He has also performed with many major orchestras, including the Detroit Symphony Orchestra, as well as other ensembles, including the UAH Wind Ensemble in Huntsville, Alabama, with which he performed in 1975.

== Teaching career ==
He served as Arthur F. Thurnau Professor and Earl V. Moore Professor of Saxophone at the University of Michigan in Ann Arbor, Michigan from 1974 to 2014.

Previously, he served on the music faculties of the Hartt School of Music and Ithaca College.

Sinta is the emeritus director of the Michigan Youth Ensembles Program, the Michigan All-State program at Interlochen Arts Camp and director of the MPulse Ann Arbor Saxophone Institute.
