= Eugene Rousseau (saxophonist) =

American classical saxophonist (1932–2024)

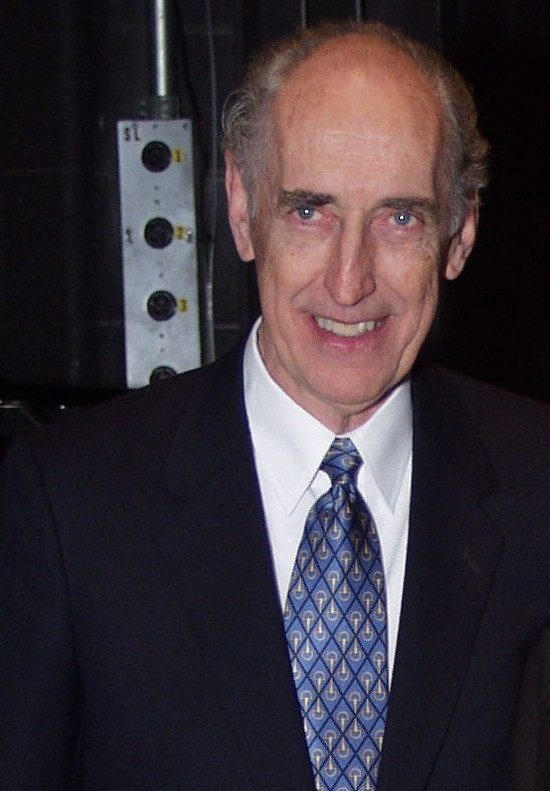
- Rousseau in 2004

Background information
- Born: Eugene Ellsworth Rousseau; August 23, 1932; Blue Island, Illinois, U.S.
- Died: August 26, 2024 (aged 92)
- Genres: Classical
- Occupations: Musician; composer; music educator
- Instruments: Alto saxophone; soprano saxophone; clarinet
- Years active: 1950s–2015

Eugene Ellsworth Rousseau (August 23, 1932 – August 26, 2024) was an American classical saxophonist. He played mainly the alto and soprano saxophones, though early in his career he was equally active as a clarinetist.

== Life and career ==
A performer on both clarinet and saxophone in his younger years, "Gene" Rousseau was heard on Chicago's WGN radio in February 1950 at age 17. He graduated from Chicagoland's Blue Island Community High School (later renamed Dwight D. Eisenhower High School) in 1950, having received the school band's top award as a graduating senior. During 1950–54, he attended Chicago Musical College while also leading a small dance band in and around Blue Island; he received his Bachelor of Music Education degree in June 1953. He completed his master's degree at Northwestern University in 1953–54, during which time he actively performed with jazz and dance combos in Chicagoland. He was briefly a member of the "Third Herd" band of Woody Herman at this time as well.

In early November 1954, Rousseau volunteered for "immediate induction" into the U.S. Army and soon departed for Camp Chaffee, Arkansas. He finished basic training in January 1955 and, after a furlough, chose specialized instruction rather than the Army's Office Candidate School. Rousseau took intelligence analysis training at Fort Riley, Kansas, but, because there were no immediately vacant positions, his remaining Army service was given to music making and instruction. With the 25th Division Band in Hawaii, he was the group's assistant director and gave woodwind lessons to several members. He led the eight-piece jazz combo, the Lightningaires, playing for Army and private functions, and formed a "junior orchestra" of Army men and children to whom he was giving private lessons.

Beginning in the late 1950s, he directed the Concert and Varsity Bands and taught all woodwinds at Luther College. His 1960–61 year, on leave from Luther College, was spent in Paris on a Fulbright Grant. He studied at the Paris Conservatory with both Marcel Mule (saxophone) and Henri Druart (clarinet); his wife, Norma, a soprano vocalist, studied with the Paris Opera's Maurice Faure. Rousseau completed his Ph.D. in music literature and performance in clarinet at the University of Iowa in 1962, having studied with Himie Voxman. During 1962–64, Rousseau was the Director of Bands (including Marching Band) at Central Missouri State College, during which time his off-campus appearances included both guest-conducting and saxophone and clarinet recitals.

Rousseau joined the Indiana University School of Music faculty in 1964 and stayed until 2000, teaching saxophone. While teaching there, he also made decades of appearances across the U.S. and beyond, as a saxophone clinician and recital or concerto soloist. His December 1966, January 1968, and October 1970 appearances in London led to his LP recording of saxophone concerti for Deutsche Grammophon, released in 1971.

With Paul Brodie, another pupil of Marcel Mule, he was the co-organizer of the first World Saxophone Congress in Chicago in 1969. The North American Saxophone Alliance honored him with its highest award, an Honorary Life Membership. Rousseau served as President of both the North American Saxophone Alliance (1979–80) and the Comité International du Saxophone (1982–85).

He began work as saxophone consultant with Yamaha Corporation in 1972. The "Eugene Rousseau saxophone mouthpiece" has been commercially available since the late 1970s. In 1985, he recorded a video program for Yamaha titled Steps to Excellence.

Rousseau taught masterclasses at the Mozarteum in Salzburg annually for many years beginning in 1991. In 1993, he was designated an honorary faculty member of the Prague Conservatory.

At Indiana University, Rousseau held the title Distinguished Professor of Music. Rousseau joined the music faculty at the University of Minnesota in the fall of 2000. In 2003, he hosted the 13th World Saxophone Congress there, having also presided over its organizing committee. He retired from teaching in 2015.

Rousseau died on August 26, 2024, at the age of 92.

== Publications ==
An early (1956) article surveyed research-to-date concerning perceptability of differences in clarinet-body material (grenadilla, metal, synthetics), reaching back to Sousa Band demonstrations by Bettoney. It remains a useful study of the matter.

Rousseau's book Marcel Mule: His Life and the Saxophone was also published in France as Marcel Mule: sa vie et le saxophone. He also published two method books: The E. Rousseau Beginning Saxophone Method (English, German, Japanese) and Saxophone High Tones (English, French, German). Many of his transcriptions for saxophone have been published as well.

== Discography ==
Rousseau recorded with the Haydn Trio of Vienna, the Budapest Strings, and the Winds of Indiana.

- Saxophone Concertos (Deutsche Grammophon, 1971) was the first disc containing only saxophone concertos with orchestra. This recording was reissued on compact disc in 1998.
- Saxophone Vocalise (Delos 3188) features Rousseau with the Winds of Indiana, Frederick Fennell, conductor, playing classical music of Bruch, Gershwin, Heiden, Massenet, Muczynski, Puccini et al.
- Celebration (McGill) features Rousseau with the Gerald Danovitch Saxophone Quartet
- Eugene Rousseau with the Haydn Trio of Vienna (RICA-1003)
- The Music of Jindrich Feld ( RICA-1004) features Rousseau playing music of this Czech composer Jindrich Feld with the Janacek Philharmonic Orchestra and pianist Jaromir Klepac
- The Undowithoutable Instrument (RICA-1002) features Rousseau playing soprano saxophone with the Budapest Strings
- Saxophone Masterpieces (RICA-1001) features Rousseau with pianist Jaromir Klepac
- Mr. Mellow (Liscio) features Rousseau with the ER Big Band
- Meditation From Thais (ALCD-7021) features Rousseau playing classical works on several different sizes of saxophones

== Musical works written for Rousseau ==
Several pieces for classical saxophone were written for Rousseau, including:

- Juan Orrego-Salas, "Partita"
- Jindřich Feld, "Sonata for Alto Saxophone and Piano"
- Bernhard Heiden, "Solo" (1969)
- Bernhard Heiden, Fantasia Concertante – for alto saxophone and winds
- Frederick A. Fox, Hear Again in Memory
- Frederick A. Fox, Visitations – for two saxophones
- Don Freund, "Skyscrapings" – for alto saxophone and piano
- David DeBoor Canfield, Concerto after Gliere (2007) – for alto saxophone and orchestra
- David DeBoor Canfield, Quintet for Alto Saxophone and String Quartet with Chimes Ad Libitum (2016)
- Libby Larsen, "Song Concerto" – for soprano and alto saxophones and chamber orchestra
- Claude Baker, "Lamentations (pour la fin du monde)" – for soprano and alto saxophones and chamber orchestra
- Marco Ciccone, "Mélodie pour Eugene Rousseau" (2014) – for alto saxophone and orchestra (strings and harp)
