= List of concert works for saxophone =

This is a partial repertoire list of concert works for saxophone.

== Saxophone and orchestra ==
=== Soprano saxophone and orchestra ===
- Duo Concertante, for soprano and alto saxophones—Jean-Baptiste Singelée (1858)
- Fantasia for soprano (or tenor) saxophone, three horns, and strings (1948)—Heitor Villa-Lobos
- Concerto for Soprano Saxophone and Strings, Op. 344 (1980)—Alan Hovhaness
- Escapades for soprano saxophone and orchestra (2021)—John Anthony Lennon
- Where the Bee Dances, concerto for soprano saxophone and orchestra (1991)—Michael Nyman
- Concerto for Soprano Saxophone and Orchestra (1993)—Michael Torke
- Your Rockaby for soprano saxophone and orchestra (1993)—Mark-Anthony Turnage
- Double Concerto for Saxophone, Cello and Orchestra (1997)—Michael Nyman
- Saxophone Concerto No. 1: Imagined Sound of Sun On Stone (1999)—Sally Beamish
- Saxophone Concerto, for soprano saxophone and chamber orchestra (2003)—Avner Dorman
- Saxophone Concerto ("Albireo Mode"), Op. 93 for soprano saxophone and orchestra (2004–2005)—Takashi Yoshimatsu
- Concerto for soprano saxophone and orchestra (2007)—Jennifer Higdon
- Concerto after Tchaikovsky for soprano saxophone and orchestra (2013)—David DeBoor Canfield
- Concerto for soprano saxophone and chamber orchestra (2014–15)—Kalevi Aho
- Soprano Saxophone Concerto (2019) - Carter Pann

=== Alto saxophone and orchestra ===
- Duo Concertante for soprano and alto saxophone—Jean-Baptiste Singelée (1858)
- Divertissement espagnol—Charles Martin Loeffler (1900)
- Rhapsody for orchestra and saxophone (1901)—Claude Debussy
- Concerto No. 1, for alto saxophone—Paul Gilson (1902)
- Concerto No 2, for alto saxophone—Paul Gilson (1902)
- Légende, symphonic suite for chromatic harp, alto saxophone and strings (1903)–André Caplet
- Choral varié, Op. 55 (1903)—Vincent d'Indy
- Légende, Op. 66 (1918)—Florent Schmitt
- Concerto in E Minor for Alto Saxophone and Orchestra, Op. 102 (1926)-Jascha Gurewich
- Concerto in E♭ major for alto saxophone (1934)—Alexander Glazunov
- Saxophone Concerto, Op. 14 (1934)—Lars-Erik Larsson
- Concertino da camera (1935)—Jacques Ibert
- Saxo Rhapsody (1936)—Eric Coates
- Scaramouche for alto saxophone (1937)—Darius Milhaud
- Ballade for Saxophone and Orchestra (1938)—Frank Martin
- Ballade for alto saxophone (1939)—Henri Tomasi
- Slawische Rhapsodie, Op. 23, for orchestra and saxophone obbligato (1940)—Viktor Ullmann
- Sonata in C♯ for alto saxophone and orchestra (1943)—Fernande Decruck
- Concerto for alto saxophone and orchestra (1944)—Paul Bonneau
- Concerto for alto saxophone and orchestra (or band), Op. 26 (1944)—Paul Creston
- Concerto for alto saxophone (1949)—Henri Tomasi
- Tableaux de Provence (1948–1955)—Paule Maurice
- Saxophone Concerto, for alto saxophone and orchestra (1951)—Henk Badings
- Concerto for alto saxophone, trumpet and string orchestra (1955)—Jean Rivier
- Concerto for alto saxophone in E♭ major (1956)—Ronald Binge
- Saxophone Concerto (1958)—Erland von Koch
- Concerto for alto saxophone (1959)—Pierre Max Dubois
- Élégie et rondeau for Alto Saxophone and Orchestra (1961)—Karel Husa
- Claremont Concerto (1962)—John Worley
- Concerto for saxophone and orchestra (1963)—William Lovelock
- Concerto for saxophone and orchestra (1966)—Ida Gotkovsky
- Saxophone Concerto No. 2 (1973)—William Lovelock
- Symphony No. 16, for alto saxophone and orchestra (1979)—Allan Pettersson
- Concerto for alto saxophone and chamber orchestra, Op. 41 (1980)—Robert Muczynski
- Concerto for alto saxophone and orchestra (... auf den ersten Blick und ohne zu wissen...) (1980)—Esa-Pekka Salonen
- Concerto for alto saxophone and orchestra (1983)—Ronald Caltabiano
- Concerto for alto saxophone and orchestra (1983)—Gunther Schuller
- Saxophone Concerto, for alto saxophone and chamber orchestra (1984)—Dominic Muldowney
- Concerto for alto saxophone and orchestra, Op.50 (1987)—Nikolai Kapustin
- Concerto for alto saxophone and orchestra (1987)-Volodymyr Runchak
- Saxophone Concerto, for alto saxophone and strings (1988)—Richard Rodney Bennett
- Concerto for alto saxophone and string orchestra (1989)—Nicola LeFanu
- Sinfonia concertante: Symphony No. 3, for alto (or soprano) saxophone and orchestra (1989/2010)—Anders Eliasson
- Concerto for alto saxophone and orchestra (1990)—Miklós Maros
- Concerto for alto saxophone and string orchestra (1993)—Krzysztof Meyer
- Music for alto saxophone and orchestra (1993/95)—Bertold Hummel
- Cyber Bird Concerto, for alto saxophone and orchestra, Op. 59 (1994)—Takashi Yoshimatsu
- My Assam Dragon for alto saxophone and orchestra (1994/1996)—Jan Sandström
- Chamber Symphony No. 3 for alto saxophone and 20 string instruments(1995–96)—Kalevi Aho
- Concerto for saxophone and Orchestra (1998/99)—Toshio Hosokawa
- Dem Licht entgegen for alto saxophone and orchestra (2001)—Sunleif Rasmussen
- Escapades (2002)—John Williams
- Concerto for alto (soprano) saxophone and string orchestra (2003/2010)—Anders Eliasson
- Concerto No. 2 for alto saxophone and Strings (2004)—Miklós Maros
- Saxophone Concerto No. 2: Under the Wing of the Rock for alto saxophone and strings (2006/2008)—Sally Beamish
- Concerto after Glière for alto saxophone and orchestra (2007)—David DeBoor Canfield
- Concerto for alto saxophone and chamber orchestra (2008)—Joan Albert Amargós
- Concerto for alto saxophone and orchestra (or wind ensemble) (2010)—Thomas Sleeper
- Rhapsody for alto Saxophone and Orchestra (2010)—André Waignein
- Hemke Concerto "Prisms of Light" for alto saxophone and orchestra (2014)—Augusta Read Thomas
- Concerto for alto saxophone and orchestra (2013)—John Adams
- Concerto for alto saxophone and orchestra opus 70b (2015)—Nimrod Borenstein
- Concerto for alto saxophone and orchestra (2018)—Karol Beffa
- Rush concerto for Alto Saxophone and Orchestra (2018)—Kenneth Fuchs

=== Tenor saxophone and orchestra ===
- Choro Concertante for tenor saxophone and orchestra (1953)—Claudio Santoro
- Suite No. 1 for tenor saxophone and strings (1963)—Alec Wilder
- Suite No. 2 for tenor saxophone and strings (1966)—Alec Wilder
- Concerto for tenor saxophone and chamber orchestra (1968)—Alec Wilder
- Chant premier, Op. 103, sonata for tenor saxophone and orchestra (1974)—Marcel Mihalovici
- Concerto for tenor saxophone and orchestra (1984)—Robert Ward
- The Upward Stream concerto for tenor saxophone and orchestra (or symphonic band, or piano) (1985)—Russell Peck
- Concerto for Stan Getz, for tenor saxophone and orchestra (1990)—Richard Rodney Bennett
- Concerto for tenor saxophone and orchestra (1992)—Eric Ewazen
- Concerto for tenor saxophone and orchestra with piano obbligato (2007)—David DeBoor Canfield
- "Graffiti Play", concerto for Tenor Saxophone, contemporary Jazz Trio (ts, bs, drs) & chamber orchestra (2014)—Esa Pietilä
- Concerto for tenor saxophone and small orchestra (2015)—Kalevi Aho

=== Baritone saxophone and orchestra ===
- Rhapsody for Baritone Saxophone and Orchestra (or Wind Orchestra, or Piano) (1983)—Mark Watters
- Concerto for Baritone Saxophone and String Orchestra (1992)—Werner Wolf Glaser
- ...and dispel the miseries of the world concerto for baritone saxophone and chamber orchestra (2007–2008)—David Gaines
- Concerto for Baritone Saxophone and Orchestra (2008)—Georg Friedrich Haas
- Vongole ! for E♭ Baritone Saxophone and Concert Band (2015)—Satoshi Yagisawa
- Jeru Concerto for E♭ Baritone Saxophone and Chamber Orchestra (2017)—Brian Landrus

=== Saxophone quartet and orchestra ===
- Concerto Sinfonico for Saxophone Quartet and Orchestra (1985)—Nicolas Flagello
- Concerto for Saxophone Quartet and Orchestra (1986)—Tristan Keuris
- Concerto Grosso for Saxophone Quartet and Orchestra (1988)—Miklós Maros
- Concierto a cuatro for Saxophone Quartet and Orchestra (1990)—Cristóbal Halffter
- Concerto for Saxophone Quartet and Orchestra (1991)—Michael Nyman
- Concerto for Saxophone Quartet and Orchestra (1992)—Charles Wuorinen
- Concerto for Saxophone Quartet and Orchestra (1995)—Philip Glass
- Concerto Grosso for Saxophone Quartet and Orchestra (or Band) (2000)—William Bolcom
- Studi per l'intonazione del mare for Voice, Saxophone Quartet, Flute Quartet, Percussion, Orchestra of one hundred flutes and Orchestra of one hundred saxophones (2000)—Salvatore Sciarrino
- Concerto for Saxophone Quartet and Orchestra (2001)—Michael Nyman
- Animal, Vegetable, Mineral for Saxophone Quartet and Orchestra (2004)—Steven Mackey
- Water Music for Saxophone Quartet and Chamber Orchestra (2004)—Brett Dean
- Concerto for Saxophone Quartet and Strings (2007)—Sally Beamish
- Kellot / Bells – Concerto for Saxophon Quartet and Orchestra (2008)—Kalevi Aho
- Four Preludes for saxophone quartet and string orchestra with percussion, Opus 63 (2015)—Fazıl Say
- Violet Winds concerto for saxophone quartet and chamber orchestra (2015)—Peeter Vähi

=== Saxophone quintet and orchestra ===
- Concerto for 5, five saxophones and orchestra (1965)—Ernest Tomlinson

== Saxophone and concert band ==
=== Soprano saxophone and concert band ===
- Saxophone Concerto for soprano saxophone and wind ensemble (1993)—Michael Torke
- Concerto for Soprano Saxophone and Band (1995)—Aldo Rafael Forte
- Concerto for Soprano Saxophone and Wind Ensemble (2007)—John Mackey
- Apollo for Soprano Saxophone and Wind Ensemble (2008)—Brian Balmages
- Concerto for Soprano Saxophone and Concert Band (2014)—Lewis Porter
- Concerto for Soprano Saxophone and Band (2015)—William Bolcom

=== Alto saxophone and concert band ===
- Concerto for alto saxophone and band (1902)—Paul Gilson
- Concerto, Op. 26, for alto saxophone and band (or orchestra) (1941)—Paul Creston
- Diversion for alto saxophone and band (1943)—Bernhard Heiden
- Concerto for alto saxophone and wind orchestra (1949/1953)—Ingolf Dahl
- Saxophoonconcert voor harmonie-orkest (1951)—Henk Badings
- Ballade for Solo E♭ Alto saxophone and Band (1956)—Alfred Reed
- Concertino for alto saxophone and orchestra (1964)—Radamés Gnattali
- Concerto for E♭ alto saxophone and Band (1966)—Frank William Erickson
- Concerto No. 1 for alto saxophone and Band (or Piano) (1966)—Walter Hartley
- Concerto for alto saxophone and wind ensemble (1966)—Alec Wilder
- Concerto for alto saxophone and Band (1967)—Karel Husa
- Concertino for alto saxophone and wind ensemble (1971)—Warren Benson
- Concertino for alto saxophone and band (1974)—Jerry Bilik
- Miscellanies for alto saxophone and wind band (1976)—Gordon Jacob
- Heater: Saga for alto saxophone and band (1977)—William Albright
- Fantasia for alto saxophone (1984)—Claude T. Smith
- Danza Capriccio for alto saxophone and band (1985)—Ron Nelson
- Panic: A Dithyramb for alto saxophone, drum kit, winds, brass and percussion (1995)—Harrison Birtwistle
- Carnival for alto saxophone and concert band (1997)—Philip Sparke
- Concert-Suite for solo E♭ alto saxophone and band (1998)—William Bolcom
- Die Heldenzeit, Concerto for alto saxophone and wind ensemble (1998)—Jun Nagao
- Concerto for alto saxophone and wind ensemble (1999)—David Maslanka
- Arioso and Presto, Op. 108, for alto saxophone and band (2001)—James Barnes
- Martyrs for the Faith, Concerto for alto saxophone and symphonic winds (2003)—David DeBoor Canfield
- Concerto Agrariana for alto saxophone and band (2003)—John Cheetham
- Concerto for alto saxophone and wind ensemble (2003)—Charles Rochester Young
- Dance of Uzume for Alto Saxophone and Symphonic Band (2004)—Piet Swerts
- Summer Concerto for alto saxophone and symphonic band (2004)—Rodney Waschka II
- Concerto after Gliere for alto saxophone and band (2009)—David DeBoor Canfield
- Fantasia for alto saxophone and band (2011)—Eric Ewazen
- Elevator Music for alto saxophone and band (2013)—David DeBoor Canfield
- Concerto for alto saxophone and wind ensemble (2014)—Steven Bryant
- Concerto for saxophone and wind ensemble (2014)—Frank Ticheli
- Fellini (for Alto Saxophone, Circus Band and Wind Orchestra) (2016)—Johan de Meij
- Triathlon (2020) - John Corigliano

=== Tenor saxophone and concert band ===
- Fragments for tenor saxophone and band (1967)—William Duckworth
- Concertino for tenor saxophone and band (or piano) (1978)—Walter Hartley
- Concerto for tenor saxophone and orchestra (transcription) (1984)—Robert Ward
- Jigsaw for tenor saxophone and band (1992)—Jack Stamp

=== Baritone saxophone and concert band ===
- Concerto for baritone saxophone and wind orchestra (2007)—Bernard van Beurden
- Vongole! for solo baritone saxophone and concert band (2013)—Satoshi Yagisawa
- Rhapsody for baritone saxophone (2014)—Mark Watters

=== Saxophone quartet and concert band ===
- Capriccio for saxophone quartet and band (1988)—Warren Barker
- And the Winds Shall Blow for saxophone quartet, winds and percussion (1994)—Wayne Peterson
- Urban Requiem for saxophone quartet and wind ensemble (1995)—Michael Colgrass
- Dialogues for saxophone quartet, winds, and percussion (2006)—James Curnow
- Windings for saxophone quartet and wind orchestra (2006)—Miklós Maros
- Concerto for saxophone quartet and wind ensemble (2012)—David Maslanka
- Concerto after Dvorak (2018)—David DeBoor Canfield
- Concerto for saxophone quartet and wind ensemble (2019)—Roger Briggs

=== Others ===
- Fantasia on Auld Lang Syne for the 16 members of the complete saxophone family, played in three groups (1976)—Ernest Tomlinson
- Trio Concertino, for alto, tenor, and baritone saxophones and band (or piano) (1999)—Walter Hartley
- Saxophone Concertino, for saxophone (doubling on both alto and soprano) and wind orchestra (2009)—Satoshi Yagisawa
- Mystic Quest, concerto for saxophone (doubling on both alto and soprano) and wind ensemble (2013)—Satoshi Yagisawa

== Saxophone and piano ==
=== Soprano saxophone and piano ===
- Caprice, Op. 80, for Soprano Saxophone and Piano (1862)—Jean-Baptiste Singelée
- Sonata for Soprano Saxophone and Piano (1982)—William Calhoun
- Sonata for Soprano Saxophone and Piano (1984)—Ronald Caravan
- Diversions for soprano saxophone and piano (1986)—Charles Rochester Young
- Sonata for Soprano Saxophone and Piano (1987)—Charles Rochester Young
- Sonata for Soprano Saxophone in B♭ and Piano (1989)—Jindřich Feld
- Sonata Aragon for soprano saxophone and piano (1989) – Dave Smith
- Sonata for Soprano Saxophone and Piano (1991)—Bill Dobbins
- Sonata for Soprano Saxophone and Piano (1993)—Robert Baksa
- Double Vision for soprano saxophone and piano (1993)—Charles Rochester Young
- Accompanied Recitative for Soprano Saxophone and Piano (1994)—Milton Babbitt
- Sonata for Soprano Saxophone and Piano (1994)—Richard Rodney Bennett
- Vocalise for Soprano Saxophone and Piano (1994)—Bertold Hummel
- Lost in Translation for soprano saxophone and piano (2005)—Dorothy Hindman
- Fanfares for soprano saxophone and piano (2006)—Huw Watkins
- Sonata for Soprano Saxophone and Piano (2006–2007)—David DeBoor Canfield
- Für Walter for soprano saxophone and piano, percussion ad libitum (2010)—Toshio Hosokawa

=== Alto saxophone and piano ===
- Caprice et Variations for Alto Saxophone and Piano (1860)—Jean-Baptiste Arban
- Fantasie sur un theme original (1860)—Jules Demersseman
- Solo de Concert (no. 1), Op. 74 for Alto Saxophone and Piano (1860)—Jean-Baptiste Singelée
- Concertino, Opus 78 for Alto Saxophone and Piano (1861)—Jean-Baptiste Singelée
- Solo de Concert No. 5, Op. 91 for Alto Saxophone and Piano (1863)—Jean-Baptiste Singelée
- Solo de Concours Op. 13 for Alto Saxophone and Piano (1874)—Paul Agricole Génin
- Le Val Fleuri (1888)—Louis Ganne
- Fantasia in F Minor for Saxophone and Piano—(1924)Jascha Gurewich
- Sonata for Saxophone and Piano, Op. 130 (1928)—Jascha Gurewich
- Hot-Sonate (1930)—Erwin Schulhoff
- Sonata for Alto Saxophone and Piano (1931)—Wolfgang Jacobi
- Suite for Alto Saxophone and Piano (1935)—Paul Dessau
- Aria for alto saxophone and piano (1936)—Eugène Bozza
- Sonata for Alto Saxophone and Piano (1937)—Bernhard Heiden
- Etudes (15) for Saxophone and Piano, Op. 188 (1942)—Charles Koechlin
- Sonata in C♯ minor, for alto saxophone and piano (1943)—Fernande Decruck
- Sonata for Alto Horn (or Alto Saxophone) and Piano (1943)—Paul Hindemith
- Sonata, Op. 19 for Alto Saxophone and Piano (1944)—Paul Creston
- Sonatina for Alto Saxophone and Piano (1953) – Lex van Delden
- Prélude, cadence et finale (1956)—Alfred Desenclos
- Sonata for Alto Saxophone (1960)—Alec Wilder
- Cinq danses exotiques (1961)—Jean Françaix
- Sonatina for Alto Saxophone and Piano (1969/95)—Bertold Hummel
- Sonata for Alto Saxophone (1970)—Edison Denisov
- Sonata for Alto Saxophone and Piano, Op. 29 (1970)—Robert Muczynski
- Variations on a Dorian Theme for alto saxophone and piano (1972)—Gordon Jacob
- Four Moods for Alto Saxophone and Piano (1975)—Phil Woods
- Sonata for Alto Saxophone and Piano (1979)—John Worley
- Albanian Summer (1980)—Dave Smith
- Divertimento (1982)—Charles Wuorinen
- Pequeña Czarda (1982)—Pedro Iturralde
- Picnic on the Marne (1983)—Ned Rorem
- Sonata for Alto Saxophone and Piano (1984)—William Albright
- Sonata for Alto Saxophone and Piano (1984) David Diamond
- Last Night (1985, rev. 1990)—Rodney Waschka II
- Poem for Alto Saxophone and Piano(1986)—Anders Eliasson
- Whirled Series (1987)—Milton Babbitt
- Keening for Alto saxophone and Piano (1987)—Michael Berkeley
- Sonata for Alto Saxophone and Piano (1988)—David Maslanka
- Sonata for Alto Saxophone and Piano (1990)—Arthur Frackenpohl
- Novella for alto saxophone and piano (1991)—Howard J. Buss
- Sonata brevis for Alto Saxophone and Piano (1991)—Bertold Hummel
- Chant (1991)—Augusta Read Thomas
- Fuzzy Bird Sonata for Alto Saxophone and Piano (1991)—Takashi Yoshimatsu
- Sonate for Alto Saxophone and Piano (1993)—Jindřich Feld
- Vocalise for Alto Saxophone and Piano (1994)—Bertold Hummel
- Pull for alto saxophone and piano (1995)—James Matheson
- Hidden Reflections (1996)—Lior Navok
- Three Piece Suite for alto saxophone and piano (1998)—Richard Rodney Bennett
- Sonata for Alto Saxophone and Piano (2000)—David DeBoor Canfield
- Sonata after Poulenc for Alto Saxophone and Piano (2013)—David DeBoor Canfield
- Ragtime Sonata after Joplin for Alto Saxophone and Piano (2013)—David DeBoor Canfield
- Sonata for Alto Saxophone (2000)—Jack Cooper
- Sonata for alto saxophone (or clarinet) and piano (2004)—Julian Wagstaff
- Contact for alto saxophone and piano (2005)—James Matheson
- Quest for Alto Saxophone and Piano (2008)—Gilad Hochman
- Quatre haikus for Alto Saxophone and Piano (2008)—Sophie Lacaze

=== Tenor saxophone and piano ===
- Concerto, Op. 57, for Tenor Saxophone and Piano (1858)—Jean-Baptiste Singelée
- Adagio et rondo, Opus 63 for Tenor Saxophone and Piano (1861)—Jean-Baptiste Singelée
- Solo de concert No. 4, Opus 84 for Tenor Saxophone and Piano (1862)—Jean-Baptiste Singelée
- Solo de concert No. 6, Opus 92 for Tenor Saxophone and Piano (1863)—Jean-Baptiste Singelée
- Premier Solo andante et bolero for tenor saxophone and piano (1866)—Jules Demersseman
- Brasiliana No. 7 for Tenor Saxophone and Piano (1956)—Radamés Gnattali
- Sonata for Tenor Saxophone and Piano (1967)—James Di Pasquale
- Sonatina for Tenor Saxophone and Piano (1969/95)—Bertold Hummel
- Sonata for Tenor Saxophone and Piano (1974)—Walter Hartley
- Sonata for Tenor Saxophone and Piano (1979)—William Schmidt
- September Sonata for tenor saxophone and piano (1985)—John Worley
- A Down East Sonata for tenor saxophone and piano (1993)—John Worley
- Quest for Tenor Saxophone and Piano (2008)—Gilad Hochman
- Sonata for Tenor Saxophone and Piano (2011)—David DeBoor Canfield
- Saxy for tenor saxophone and piano (2019)—Howard J. Buss

=== Baritone saxophone and piano ===
- Fantaisie, Op. 60, for Baritone Saxophone and Piano (1858)—Jean-Baptiste Singelée
- Solo de concert (No. 2), Op. 77, for Baritone Saxophone and Piano (1861)—Jean-Baptiste Singelée
- Solo de concert No. 3, Op. 83, for Baritone Saxophone and Piano (1862)—Jean-Baptiste Singelée
- Solo de concert No. 7, Op. 93, for Baritone Saxophone and Piano (1863)—Jean-Baptiste Singelée
- Little Suite for Baritone saxophone and piano (1974)—Walter Hartley
- Big Fun for Baritone saxophone and piano (2012)—Dorothy Hindman
- Sonata, Op. 6, for Baritone Saxophone and Piano (1976)—Garland Anderson
- Sonata for Baritone Saxophone and Piano (1976)—Walter Hartley
- Rhapsodie for Baritone Saxophone and Piano (1988)—Harald Genzmer
- Sonata for Baritone Saxophone and Piano (2008)—David DeBoor Canfield
- Duo for Baritone Saxophone and Piano (2008)—Walter Hartley

== Saxophone, piano and percussion ==
See List of compositions for saxophone, piano and percussion

Cyberbird Concerto, trio reduction – Yoshimatsu Takashi

== Saxophone quartet ==
- Premier Quatuor, Op. 53 (1857)—Jean-Baptiste Singelée
- Saxophone Quartet in B♭ Op. 109 (1932)—Alexander Glazunov
- Introduction et variations sur une ronde populaire (1934)—Gabriel Pierné
- Petit Quatuor pour saxophones (1935) Jean Françaix
- Andante et scherzo for Saxophone Quartet (1938)—Eugène Bozza
- Quartet for Saxophones, Op. 102 (1939)—Florent Schmitt
- Quartet for Saxophones (1956)—Pierre Max Dubois
- Quartet for Saxophones (1963)—Alfred Desenclos
- Saxophone Quartet (1963)—Alec Wilder
- Saxophone Quartet No. 1 (1964)--John Carisi
- Quartet (1969)—Guy Lacour
- Saxophone Quartet No. 1 (1973)—Gordon Jacob
- Variations on a Theme of Stravinsky (1974)—Bernard Hoffer
- Drift (2002)—Dorothy Hindman
- Drastic Measures (1976)—Russell Peck
- Light and Shadow (1978)—Robert Starer
- Line Drawing after Mark Tobey (1978)—Samuel Alder
- Suite for Saxophone Quartet (1979)—Paul Creston
- Saxophone Quartet No. 2 (1979)—Gordon Jacob
- Quartet for Saxophones (1984)—Werner Wolf Glaser
- Quartet for Saxophones (1984)—Miklós Maros
- Music for Saxophones (1986)—Tristan Keuris
- Lament (1986)—Matthew Levy
- XAS (1987)—Iannis Xenakis
- Back Burner (1989)—Frank Ticheli
- Music for four Saxophones (1990)—Bertold Hummel
- Four5 (1991)—John Cage
- Fractal (1991)—Cristóbal Halffter
- From My Diary (1992)—Branko Lazarin
- Saxophone Quartet (1992)—Charles Wuorinen
- Lamentatio (1992)—Erkki-Sven Tüür
- Saxophone Quartet No.1 – Roads to Ixtlan (1992–93)—Per Nørgård
- Saxophone Quartet No. 2 – Viltir Svanir (Wild Swans) (1994)—Per Nørgård
- Saxophone Quartet (1994)—Richard Rodney Bennett
- Saxophone Quartet No.3 – Dansere omkring Jupiter (Dancers around Jupiter) (1995)—Per Nørgård
- Variations (On Several Lines by Amy Clampitt (1995)—Sidney Corbett
- Short Stories (1995)—Jennifer Higdon
- 4our Dedicated to Stockholm Saxophone Quartet (2016)—Arshia Samsaminia
- July (1995)—Michael Torke
- American Sketches for saxophone quartet (1996)—Aldo Rafael Forte
- Windup (1996)—Wayne Peterson
- Mountain Roads (1997)—David Maslanka
- Pagine for saxophone quartet (1998)—Salvatore Sciarrino
- Canzoniere da Scarlatti for saxophone quartet (1998)—Salvatore Sciarrino
- Saxophone Quartet (1999)—Lior Navok
- Rise (2001)—Steven Bryant
- Out of the Blue (2001)—Frank Ticheli
- 24 Hour Sax Quartet (2004)—Michael Nyman
- Dry Bones (2005)—Howard J. Buss
- Market Forces (2005)—Eric Moe
- Fireworks (2011)—Karol Beffa
- Unquiet Spirits (2012)—John Mackey
- Jesous ahatonhia (2013)—Sophie Lacaze
- Steamboat (2014)—Michael Daugherty
- Levi's Dream (2015)—Howard J. Buss
- Ex Machina (2017)—Marc Mellits
- Cerulean (2017)—David Biedenbender
- Finding The Words (2019)—Michael Markowski
- The Contraption (2019)—Lachlan Kuhn
- Quadrangoli d'autunno for saxophone quartet (2021)—Salvatore Sciarrino

== Saxophone and choir ==
- Galgenlieder (Gallows Songs) for Saxophone Quartet and Choir (2014)—Lera Auerbach
- Galgenlieder (Gallows Songs) for Saxophone Quartet and Children Choir (2015)—Lera Auerbach
- I Saw Eternity for Soprano Saxophone and TTBB Choir (2012)—Paul Mealor
- Making or Breaking for Soprano Saxophone and SSAATTBB Choir (2015)—Kim André Arnesen
- Sacred Light for Soprano Saxophone and TTBB Choir (2012)—Ola Gjeilo
- Amao omi for Saxophone Quartet and Choir - Giya Kancheli

== Saxophone: other chamber works ==
- Impressions d’automne, Elegy for alto saxophone, oboe, 2 clarinets, basson, harp, organ and 2 cellos (1905)–André Caplet
- Quartet, for clarinet, tenor saxophone, piano and violin, Op.22 (1928–1930)—Anton Webern
- Konzertstück for two alto saxophones (1933)—Paul Hindemith
- Canonic Suite for four alto saxophones (1939)—Elliott Carter
- Quiet City for trumpet, alto saxophone, B♭ clarinet (doubling bass clarinet), and piano (1939)—Aaron Copland
- Counterpoise No. 1 for Trumpet, Baritone Saxophone, Piano, and Drums (1948/49)--John Carisi
- Quartet No. 1 for Trumpet, Tenor Saxophone, Piano and Percussion (1950/1954)—Stefan Wolpe
- All Set for alto saxophone, tenor saxophone, trumpet, trombone, bass, piano, vibraphone, and percussion (1957)—Milton Babbitt
- Duo Concertante for alto saxophone, soprano saxophone, and piano, Op. 55 (1858)—Jean-Baptiste Singelée
- Suite for baritone saxophone, horn and wind quintet (1966)—Alec Wilder
- Suite for baritone saxophone, woodwind sextet, bass, and drums (1971)—Alec Wilder
- Suite for Saxophone and Guitar, Op. 291 (1976)—Alan Hovhaness
- Saxophon for soprano saxophone & bongo, or soprano saxophone alone (1977)—Karlheinz Stockhausen
- Piccolo for saxophone with geisha bell (1977)—Karlheinz Stockhausen
- Knabenduett (Boys' Duet) for two soprano saxophones (1977)—Karlheinz Stockhausen
- Invocationes for soprano saxophone and organ (1978/1995)—Bertold Hummel
- Duo for soprano saxophone and alto saxophone (1981)—Gordon Jacob
- Quartet for flute, alto saxophone, guitar and solo percussion (1982)—Kalevi Aho
- Linker Augentanz (Left-Eye Dance) for 7 (or 11) saxophones, synthesizer and percussion (1983/90)—Karlheinz Stockhausen
- Entführung (Abduction) for soprano saxophone and electronic and concrete music (1986/2004)—Karlheinz Stockhausen
- Due a due for soprano saxophone and percussion (1987)—Bertold Hummel
- Aragonesca for soprano/alto saxophone, bass clarinet, violin and cello (1987)—Dave Smith
- To Brooklyn Bridge for 24 voices, saxophone quartet and mixed ensemble (1987–88)—Tristan Keuris
- Noel - A little christmas suite for 3 Saxophones (1989)—Bertold Hummel
- Escapade for alto saxophone and four percussion (1991)—Howard J. Buss
- Pit Band for alto saxophone, bass clarinet, and piano (1993)—William Albright
- Quintet for alto saxophone, bassoon, viola, violoncello and double bass (1994) – Kalevi Aho
- Impromptu for soprano saxophone and marimba (1994)—Howard J. Buss
- In Erwartung (В ожидании) for saxophone quartet and six percussionists (1994)—Sofia Gubaidulina
- Quartet for tenor saxophone, violin, viola, and cello (1994)—Josef Tal
- Pictures from the Sea's Garden for saxophone and percussion (1998)—Sunleif Rasmussen
- Here of amazing most now for fl/alt fl/picc, oboe/EH, soprano saxophone, guitar, cello, double bass, piano, percussion (1999)—Gerald Levinson
- Rough Winds Do Shake the Darling Buds for saxophone trio (1999)—Eric Moe
- At the Still Point of the Turning World, There the Dance Is for oboe/EH, cl/bs cl, sop sax/bari sax, viola, cello, dbl bass, guitar, perc. (2002)—Gerald Levinson
- Meditatio for mixed chorus and saxophone quartet (2003)—Erkki-Sven Tüür
- Verwandlung (Transformation) for trombone, saxophone quartet, cello, double bass, and tam-tam (2004)—Sofia Gubaidulina
- Walk the Walk for baritone saxophone (or bass clarinet or contrabassoon) and percussion (2005)—–Michael Daugherty
- Concerto for 22 Instruments (completed 2005)—Alistair Hinton (scored for 22 wind instruments including parts for 1 each soprano, alto, baritone and contrabass saxophones)
- Erwachen (Awakening), Nr. 92, for soprano saxophone, trumpet, and cello (2007)—Karlheinz Stockhausen
- Edentia for soprano saxophone and electronic music (2007)—Karlheinz Stockhausen
- Quartet for soprano saxophone and strings (2008)—James Matheson
- Three Jazzicals for soprano saxophone and tuba (2009)—Howard J. Buss
- Cosmic Portraits for flute, clarinet, alto saxophone, and tenor saxophone (2009)—Howard J. Buss
- Lullaby opus 81c for alto saxophone, violin and piano (2018)—Nimrod Borenstein
- Prayer without Words for soprano saxophone and harp (2018) – Gilad Hochman
- Visitations from the Dark for alto saxophone, bass clarinet, and piano (2020)—Howard J. Buss
- Sonic Tapestries for alto saxophone, violin, and piano (2020)—Howard J. Buss
- Schizophrenia for alto sax and marimba (2011) – Shai Cohen
- ALEA IACTA EST For alto sax, electric guitar and cello (2022) – Shai Cohen
- Closer for two alto saxophones (2022) – Gilad Hochman
- Slippery Trapeze for clarinet, alto saxophone and bassoon (2024) – Lior Navok

== Unaccompanied saxophone works ==
- Caprice En Forme De Valse (1950)—Paul Bonneau
- Improvisation et caprice for solo saxophone (1952)—Eugène Bozza
- Tre Pezzi for soprano (or tenor) saxophone (1956)—Giacinto Scelsi
- Introduction, Dance and Furioso (1959)—Herbert Couf
- Partita for alto saxophone, Op. 99x (1968)—Alois Hába
- Djiwa for solo saxophone (1971)—Laurence Wyman
- Improvisation I (1972)—Ryo Noda
- Parable XI for Alto Saxophone, Op. 123 (1972)—Vincent Persichetti
- Improvisation II & III (1975)—Ryo Noda
- Mai (1978)—Ryo Noda
- Images for Saxophones and Tape (1979)—Milton Babbitt
- Tre Pezzi for saxophone in E♭ solo (1979)—Bertold Hummel
- Sequenza IXb for Alto Saxophone (1981)—Luciano Berio
- Three Pieces (1981)—Branko Lazarin
- In Freundschaft (1982)—Karlheinz Stockhausen
- Amour for saxophone (1976/2003)—Karlheinz Stockhausen
- Getting To Know The Weather Solo Baritone Saxophone (1986)—Eve Beglarian
- A Day in the City for solo saxophone (1986)—Howard J. Buss
- Midnight Omen for solo saxophone (1986)—Howard J. Buss
- Phoenix (1988)—Ryo Noda
- Hard for tenor saxophone solo (1988)—Christian Lauba
- Sequenza VIIb for Soprano Saxophone (adaptation by Claude Delangle in 1993)—Luciano Berio
- Melodies for Saxophone (1995)—Philip Glass
- Steady Study on the Boogie (1995)—Christian Lauba
- Nine Études for Saxophones in 4 books (1996)—Christian Lauba
- Sundance for the Kid for Alto Saxophone (1998)—Laurence Wyman
- Eight Bagatelles for Soprano Saxophone (1999)—Bertold Hummel
- Le Psaume salé for saxophone solo + tape + live-electronics (2001)—Sunleif Rasmussen
- Monologue for Solo Saxophone (2003)—Gilad Hochman
- Three Episodes for Solo Saxophone (2005)—Gilad Hochman
- 90 Sec for Solo Saxophone (2007)—Gilad Hochman
- La Seine for alto saxophone (2007)—James Matheson
- Obsession for Solo Saxophone (2009)—Karol Beffa
- Solitude for Solo Alto Saxophone (2020)—Andrew March
