= Tak Chiu Wong =

Hong Kong musician

Tak Chiu Wong (黃德釗) is a Hong Kong saxophonist, teacher, and arranger.

He serves as faculty of Education University of Hong Kong, Hong Kong Academy for Performing Arts, Hong Kong Baptist University and University of Hong Kong. He is also artistic director of Asia Pacific Saxophone Academy in Bangkok, Thailand. Wong is a Selmer Paris and D'addario performing artist.

== Biography ==
Wong started his first music training at the school band of St. Bonaventure College and High School under director Alfonso Wong. In 2003, he entered Hong Kong Academy for Performing Arts under instruction of Michael Campbell and Jennifer To. He graduated with Bachelor of Music (with Honors) in 2008.

Wong traveled to France and U.S.A. respectively for further studies. He has admitted to the class of Jean-Yves Fourmeau at Conservatoire à rayonnement régional de Cergy-Pontoise in France; and obtained Master of Music degree from University of Wyoming under instruction of Scott Turpen, and Doctoral of Music Art degree from West Virginia University under instruction of Michael Ibrahim. Wong also had private studies with Vincent David, Claude Delangle, Daniel Gauthier, Jean-Marie Londeix, and Otis Murphy.

Wong was a visiting lecturer of Singapore Polytechnic and Singapore Nanyang Academy of Fine Arts from 2011 to 2012. He was teaching assistant at the University of Wyoming and West Virginia University from 2012 to 2017. Since 2017, he serves as faculty at Education University of Hong Kong, Hong Kong Academy for Performing Arts, Hong Kong Baptist University, and University of Hong Kong. He also serves as artistic director of Asia Pacific Saxophone Academy in Bangkok, Thailand. His students have been admitted into Asia Youth Orchestra, and several graduate programs in universities in U.S.A.

== Career ==
Praised as "Fantastic, excellent player" by Gerard Schwarz, conductor of the Seattle Symphony Orchestra, Wong developed his career as both performer, teacher, and arranger. He was prize winner of Asian Youth Music Competition (Hong Kong), Concour de Saxophone Parisien (France), and Jacoby Competition (U.S.A.). His noticeable performances include Asia premiere of urtext version of Glazunov’s Concerto (2011, Taiwan), Hong Kong premiere of Satoshi Yagisawa’s Saxophone Concertino (2011, Hong Kong), Asia premiere of Qigang Chen’s Feu D'ombres (2016, Singapore), Pierre Boulez’s Dialogue de l'ombre double (2016, U.S.A.), and world premiere of Jean-Philippe Vanbeselaeres's Tribute to Mister L. (2019, Thailand). He was the featuring artist of automobile manufacturer Audi at the 13th Beijing International Automobile Exhibition for Transportation (2014, China), and Moger Arte e Cultura Società Cooperativa Sociale (2015, Italy).

In 2016, he was awarded the renowned Barlow Award for commission project between Amigo Saxophone Quartet and composer Diana Soh, making it the first and only saxophone ensemble to receive such award since its establishment in 1983.

Wong performed regularly with ensembles and orchestras such as the Hong Kong Sinfonietta and the Hong Kong Philharmonic Orchestra. He was regular featuring artist with the Amigo Saxophone Quartet in Singapore Saxophone Symposium since 2011. In 2018 and 2019, he performed 2 China tours with La Sax and acclaimed Hong Kong magician and children entertainer Harry Wong for musical show SaxoCarnival and JunGo!.

Apart from regular courses at universities in Hong Kong, Wong has invited to present masterclasses including those at Wuhan Conservatory (China), Chinese University of Hong Kong, Nayang Academy of Performing Arts (Singapore), and Kasetsart University (Thailand), etc. He was judge of international competition such as Asia Pacific Saxophone Competition (Thailand), ENKOR Competition (Germany), and Singapore Woodwind Festival Competition (Singapore).

Wong endorses Selmer Paris saxophone and D’addario reeds.

== Asia Pacific Saxophone Academy ==
In 2013, Wong co-found the Asia Pacific Saxophone Academy, an annual summer saxophone festival in Thailand, with several professors in Asia and Europe, aiming to enhance the education and communication among saxophone lovers, students, and teachers in Asia. He currently serves as the artistic director of the Asia Pacific Saxophone Academy.

== Works ==
=== Arrangements ===
Wong has arranged music in all genres. They have been performed in Asia, Australia, Europe and United States, including Central Conservatory of Music (China) and Melbourne Conservatorium of Music (Australia). They are published by Sheet Music Press and Theodore Presser.

=== Commissions ===
Wong has been commissioned and premiered over 50 works that are dedicated to him, including new compositions from Chen Yi (United States), Zechariah Goh (Singapore), Chi-hin Leung (Hong Kong), Narong Prangcharoen (Thailand), Diana Soh (Singapore), Richard Tsang (Hong Kong), and Jean-Philippe Vanbeselaeres (France), Austin Yip (Hong Kong). These works were published by BabelScores, Europa Musica Publishing, and Theodore Presser.
