= Cynthia Johnston Turner =

American conductor and clinician

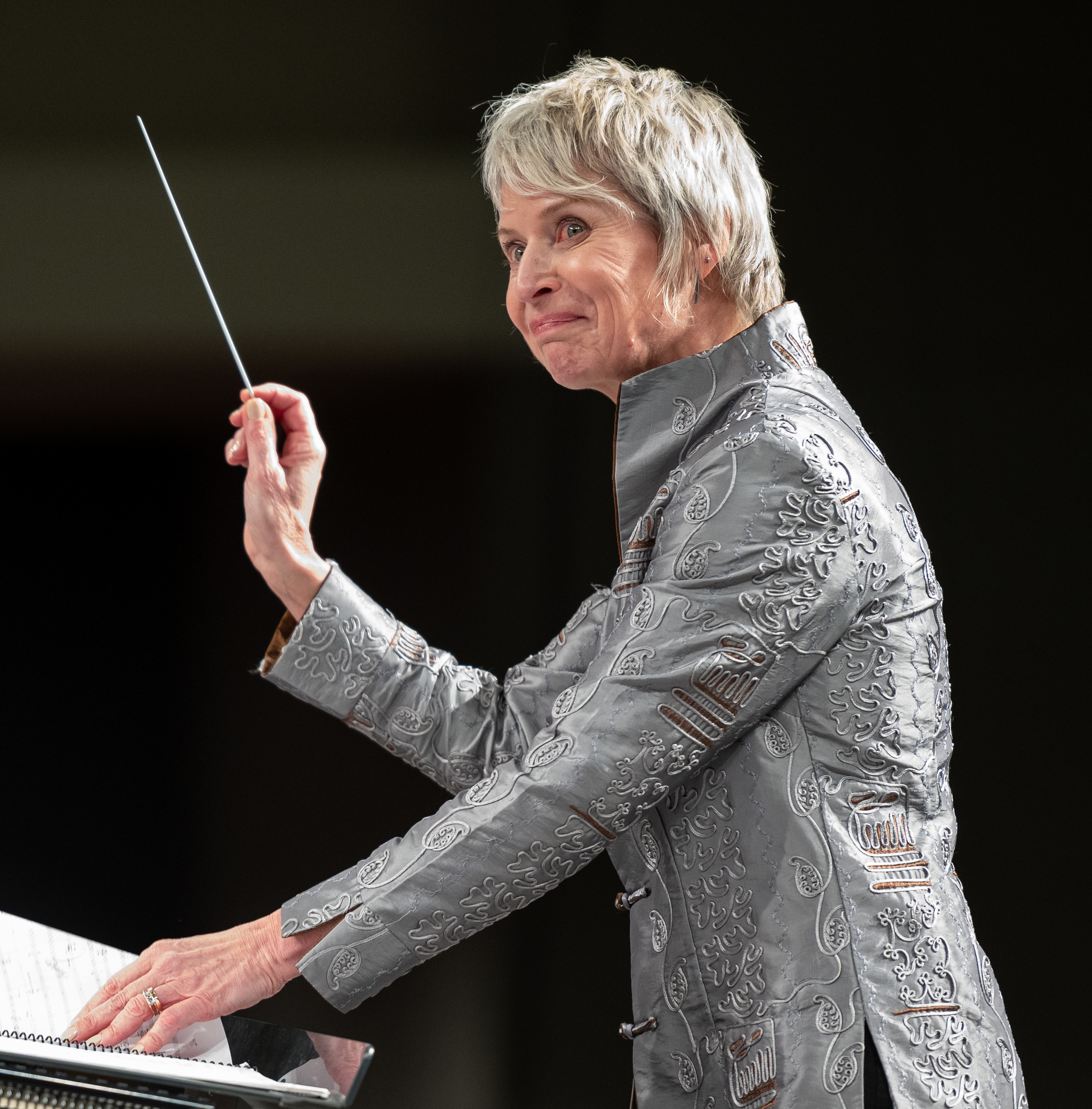
- Turned in 2022
- Education: Queen's University; University of Toronto; University of Victoria (MM); Eastman School of Music (D.M.A.)
- Occupation: Conductor

Cynthia Johnston Turner is an active conductor, speaker and clinician globally. She was appointed Dean of the Faculty of Music at Wilfrid Laurier University in July 2021. Previously, she served as Director of Bands on the faculty of the Hugh Hodgson School of Music at the University of Georgia where she oversaw the entire UGA Band program, including the approximately 440-member Redcoat Marching Band, and the Masters and Doctoral students in conducting. She was also chair of the conducting area, and artistic director of the Contemporary Chamber Ensemble. She formerly served on the faculty of Cornell University, where she directed the Wind Ensemble, Wind Symphony, Ensemble X, and chamber winds. She was appointed Artistic Director and Conductor of the Wellington Wind Symphony in 2023 and Festival Winds at Summer Music Society in 2024. She has recently been elected President of the World Association of Symphonic Bands and Ensembles (WASBE).

== Education ==
A dual citizen of Canada and the United States, Turner completed her Bachelor of Music and Bachelor of Education degrees at Queen's University, an Honour Specialist at the University of Toronto, and her Master of Music in music education and conducting at the University of Victoria. Touring with her ensembles inspired her master's thesis on the musical and personal transformations that occur on tours, and her D.M.A. thesis at the Eastman School of Music centered on Dialogues and Entertainments by William Kraft. At Eastman, she was the recipient of the Eastman Graduate Teaching Award in conducting. She was nominated for the Canadian Prime Minister's Leadership in Teaching Award and received the National Leadership in Education Award (Reader's Digest Foundation), the Excellence in Education Award (Ontario Secondary School Teachers Federation), and the Marion Drysdale Leadership Among Women Teachers Award (also from OSSTF).

== Career ==
Turner has guest conducted the United States Army Band ("Pershing's Own"), United States Navy Band, Brooklyn Wind Symphony, National Army Band of Portugal, Music for All's National Band of America, National Youth Wind Ensemble of Great Britain, the Syracuse Symphony ("Symphoria"), the National Youth Band of Canada, University of Southern California Thornton Wind Ensemble, University of Illinois Wind Symphony, National Intercollegiate Band (KKPsi/TBS), Concordia Santa Fe, the Ithaca College Wind Ensemble, the Eastman Wind Ensemble, the Latin American Honor Band, the National Band of Costa Rica, the National Orchestra of Heredia, and most state honor bands. Turner has been invited to present her research with teaching and technology, innovative rehearsal techniques, and service-learning and music performance at numerous conferences nationally and internationally. She is published in such journals as Music Educators Journal, Interdisciplinary Humanities, International Journal of the Humanities, Journal of the World Association of Bands and Ensembles, Fanfare Magazine, and Canadian Winds, has published chapters in "The Future of the Wind Band" (2022), "Women in Wind Band" (2022), and "Go On: Tell Your Story" (2023) and has recorded CDs with the Innova, Acis Productions, and Albany labels.

While at Cornell, she led the Cornell Wind Ensemble on performing and service-learning tours to Costa Rica and Panama that include performances and masterclasses across the two countries and the donation of instruments (over 250 as of April 2014) to a rural 'escuela de musicas.' The Hodgson Wind Ensemble has taken similar tours to rural Georgia (including prisons) and Panama.

Turner has commissioned hundreds of new works for wind band, contemporary music ensembles, and orchestra, and she continues to actively promote commissions by today's leading and emerging composers around the world. Under her direction, the Cornell Wind Ensemble was invited to perform at the College Band Directors National Association's Eastern Division Conference in 2007 and 2012, and the Hodgson Wind Ensemble will perform at CBDNA National in Kansas City in 2017. In 2008, the Merrill Presidential Scholars at Cornell recognized Turner as an outstanding educator, and in 2009, she was awarded the Kaplan Family Distinguished Faculty Fellowship. Her performances have been praised by such composers as Steven Stucky, Omar Thomas, William Kraft, Steven Bryant, Marc Mellits, Melinda Wagner, Peter Lane, Eddie Mora Bermudez, John Mackey, Dana Wilson, Roberto Sierra, and Karel Husa. She has worked with such soloists as Otis Murphy, Gary Curtin, Patrick Sheridan, Jose Sibaja, Harry Waters, David Zerkel, Pamela Mia Paul, Phil Smith, Joseph Alessi, Derek Roddy, and many others.

She is a member of the College Band Directors National Association, WASBE, National Band Association, and was elected to the American Bandmasters Association in 2020. She serves on the advisory board of a variety of organizations. She is published and/or cited in numerous journals and books, and has released albums with Innova, Albany Records. In 2025, Acis Productions released, "An Evening with Michael Barry: From Showstopper to Encore" with Budapest Winds, available on all major streaming platforms.

== Selected publications and recordings ==
- "An Evening with Michael Barry: From Showstopper to Encore" (2025) Acis Productions
- "Go On, Tell Your Story" (2023) GIA Publications
- "Women in Wind Band" (2022) GIA Publications
- "The Future of the Wind Band" (2022) GIA Publications
- "Charlottesville and Citizen Artistry" (2019) NewMusicBox (newmusicusa.org)
- "Velocity Meadows" by Christopher Stark (2018) Hodgson Wind Ensemble, available on iTunes, Spotify, CDBaby
- "It's Not What We Do, It's How We Do It" (2018) NewMusicBox (newmusicusa.org)
- The New Winds of Change: the Evolution of the Contemporary American Wind Band/Ensemble and Its Music, Frank Battisti (one of nine collegiate conductors interviewed for Chapter 23, "What Leaders Think," (pp. 411–426) plus citations on pp. 230, 251, 263, 327, 335, 380. Meredeth Music Publications, 2018
- The Conductor's Companion: 100 Rehearsal Techniques, Imaginative Ideas, Quotes, and Facts, compiled and edited by Gary Stith. "iPad Rehearsals" p. 26, 2017
- "Music Here and Now" (Innova 970, 2017) Society for New Music, available on iTunes
- "Educators Can't Become Dinosaurs": USA Today OpEd, 2014
- "Another Perspective: crowd-sourcing our ensemble rehearsals," Music Educators Journal, Dec. 2013
- "Augenblick" (Albany, 2012), Cornell Wind Ensemble, available on iTunes and Amazon
- "What's With the Russian Soldier? How Acting and Movement Classes Inform my Conducting, Canadian Winds/Vents Canadiens: the Journal of the Canadian Band Association, Vol. 10, No. 1, 2011
- "Leaving the Safe Harbor: Music, Social, and Ensemble Adventures," International Journal of the Humanities, 2009
- "Serendipity" 2-CD release with the Society for New Music (Innova, 2010), available on iTunes and Amazon.com (Winner of 2010 "Sammy" award)
- Canzon 26 by Pietro Lappi, arranged for Wind Ensemble, Tierolff Musiekcentrale, Netherlands, 2009
- Nine sili nebesniye (Rejoice now heavenly powers) by Alexander Sheremetiev/arranged for trombone choir by C. Johnston Turner, Tierolff Musiekcentrale, Netherlands, 2009
- "Dialogues and Entertainments by William Kraft: An Interpretive Analysis." Journal of the World Association for Symphonic Bands and Ensembles 11 (2004).
- "The Wind Band Concert: A Bleak Future?" Journal of the World Association for Symphonic Bands and Ensembles 10 (2003).
- "Music and Journey: Personal and Ensemble Transformation on the Band Tour." Canadian Music Educator 43/2 (2002).
