= David DeBoor Canfield =

American composer

David DeBoor Canfield (born September 23, 1950) is an American composer of classical music.

== Early life and education ==
David DeBoor Canfield (birth name, David Ellis Canfield) was born in Fort Lauderdale, Florida, on September 23, 1950. Early musical studies were with his father, John Canfield, who taught his son piano, violin and music theory beginning when he was six years old. Canfield's first juvenile compositions date from 1957 when he was seven, but throughout high school and the first two and a half years of college, he pursued studies in chemistry, only changing his major to music halfway through his junior year. Graduate studies in composition were undertaken at Indiana University, where Canfield studied primarily with John Eaton, as well as with Frederick Fox and Bernhard Heiden. He received his Master of Music in 1977 and Doctor of Music in 1983. Not wishing to pursue a career in academia, he instead began in 1978 a business, Ars Antiqua, selling classical LP records around the world, becoming the largest such dealer for several decades. All the while, however, he continued to compose, building up a catalog of around 200 mature works. It was in graduate school that he replaced his given middle name with his mother's maiden name for professional use.

== Music ==
Canfield's music has been heard on five continents, and has been performed by some of the world's most accomplished soloists, including saxophonists Claude Delangle, Otis Murphy, Stephen Page, Timothy Roberts (saxophonist), Kenneth Tse, and the Oasis Quartet and Zzyzx Quartet; violinists Andrés Cárdenas and Rachel Patrick; pianists John O'Conor, David Brunell, and Benjamin Boren, and ensembles such as the Indianapolis Symphony Orchestra, Moscow Philharmonic Orchestra, United States Marine Band, United States Navy Band, Orchestre de la Garde Republicaine, Sinfonia Varsovia, Columbus Indiana Philharmonic, Thailand Philharmonic Orchestra, Poznan Philharmonic Orchestra (Poland), Sinfonia da Camera, and the Southeast Iowa Symphony Orchestra. Canfield's music has won numerous accolades including first place in the Jill Sackler Composition Contest and the Dean's Prize from Indiana University. His music formed the basis of a three-day festival given by faculty and students of the University of Central Oklahoma in 2001, and has been featured at the World Saxophone Congresses of 2003, 2006, 2009 & 2012. His music is published by Jeanné, Inc., TRN, and Evensong Music, and is recorded on the Albany, Bloomington Symphony Orchestra, Crystal, Enharmonic, Jeanné Digital Recordings, Move, MSR, Recherché, Toccata Classics, and US Navy Band labels.

In recent years, he has augmented the works he has written in his usual style of "free tonality" with a group of pieces he terms his "after" series. This group includes numerous works written in the style of older composers who did not happen to write for certain instruments. The earliest of these works, his 2007 Concerto after Glière, has received more than 100 performances in 30 countries to date, given that it was written for saxophone and orchestra in a romantic style for an instrument that has little original romantic music. Although this work draws upon some of Glière's music, subsequent works in the "after" series, including Quintet after Schumann (for saxophone quartet and piano), Trio after Brahms (for alto sax, violin and piano) and Rhapsody after Gershwin (for violin and orchestra) utilize no direct quotes from the composers in whose tribute they have been written.
