= Abdon Laus =

Algerian-born American bassoonist and saxophonist

Abdon Laus (April 8, 1888, in Algiers – July 29, 1945, in Newton, Massachusetts) was an Algerian-born American bassoonist and saxophonist who was principal bassoon for the Boston Symphony Orchestra and founder of the Boston Saxophone Orchestra.

Trained in Paris, France, Laus "received first prize from the conservatory of Paris" in 1910. While in France, he appeared as soloist with Théâtre des Champs-Élysées and the Paris Opera. He came to the United States in 1918 with the French Military Band of the Garde Republicaine, who performed in Boston's Symphony Hall under the auspices of the United States War Department, and remained here, joining the Boston Symphony Orchestra as a replacement musician when the orchestra removed 18 German players for being enemy aliens. The Boston Sunday Post stated, "Members of this band were given to understand that any engagements they were to make in America they were at liberty to fill. It is a good exchange in more than one way for the Boston Symphony. It makes the Boston Symphony an orchestra 100 percent American and pro-ally."

Laus was appointed principal bassoonist in 1918, a chair he filled until 1936, when he began a term in the third chair which lasted until 1945.

== Role in Sacre du Printemps premiere ==
Though the claim is disputed by some, by many accounts, Abdon Laus was the bassoonist at the premiere of Igor Stravinsky's Sacre du Printemps, in the 1913 season of Sergei Diaghilev's Ballets Russes. In Thomas Forrest Kelly's First Nights, Five Musical Premieres, oboist Louis-Marius Speyer is quoted as saying of that first performance," Already the introduction was a surprise, a bassoon in that register, we all looked, and even some composers present asked if it was a saxophone. Abdon Laus, who later became the first bassoon of the Boston Symphony Orchestra, under Monteux, was the first to attack this difficult solo; he had to find fingerings, which was a terrible experience. Today any good player knows this solo."

== Boston Saxophone Orchestra ==
In 1924–25, Laus organized and led the Boston Saxophone Orchestra, an ensemble "made up of professional and good amateur players" ranging from 43 players to as many as 85 over the course of its existence. A number of prominent musicians were invited to a private performance of the ensemble on February 15, 1925. On March 1, 1925, the Boston Saxophone Orchestra gave its first public performance at Bates Hall in the Boston Public Library's McKim Building. This performance was also broadcast on the Westinghouse Radio Network. On June 17, 1925, the Boston Saxophone Orchestra gave its first concert in Boston's Symphony Hall. This Symphony Hall debut was followed by another concert on February 10, 1926, which included transcriptions of works by Beethoven, Wagner, and Gounod and featured 4 soprano, 16 alto, 8 C-melody, 8 tenor, 4 baritone, 2 bass and 1 contrabass saxophones "together with string basses, assorted percussion and the hall's large organ. The noted saxophonist Jascha Gurewich also performed on this concert.

The ensemble's classical music emphasis was typical of the time, and, in fact, was intended as a counter the saxophone's use in popular music. The Boston Saxophone Orchestra was explicit in its aims of "lifting the instrument to a higher plane of performance" and "fostering better music for the instrument." The Saxophone orchestra performed in and around the Boston area for several years, including one notable performance at The Perkins Institute for the Blind in 1926.

Laus was honored by the French Government with the Ordre des Palmes Académiques in 1925. In the mid-1930s, Laus served as Vice president Le Societe de Prevoyance in Boston.
