= Shai Cohen =

Israeli composer, sound artist, and music-technology researcher (born 1968)

Shai Cohen שי כהן
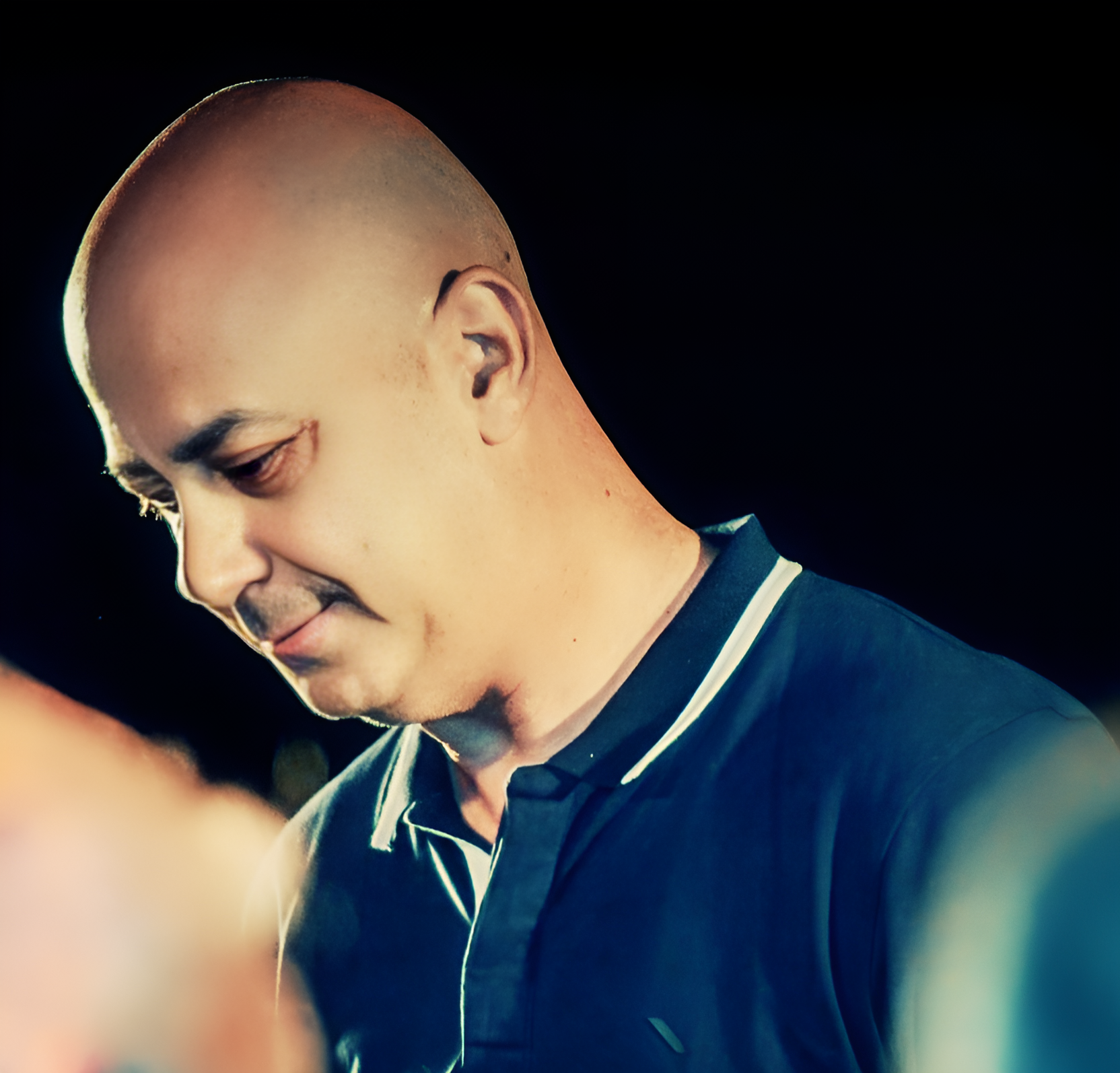

Background information
- Born: January 28, 1968 (age 58); Haifa, Israel
- Genres: Contemporary classical, electroacoustic, experimental music, jazz
- Occupations: Composer, sound artist, researcher, educator
- Instruments: Flute, saxophone, piano
- Years active: 1993–present
- Website: mashav.com/sha/

Shai Cohen (born 28 January 1968) is an Israeli composer, sound artist, and music-technology researcher. He is an associate professor at Bar-Ilan University, where he serves as Head of the Department of Music and Director of the Music and Technology Program. His artistic and scholarly activities encompass contemporary composition, electroacoustic music, computational sound analysis, interactive systems, and interdisciplinary research in music and technology.

== Biography ==
Born in Haifa, Cohen studied composition and jazz performance at the Jerusalem Academy of Music and Dance, graduating in 1994. He subsequently earned a master's degree in music composition in 2003 and a Ph.D. in 2007 from Bar-Ilan University. He joined the university's Department of Music in 2003.

Cohen served as chairman of the Israel Composers' League and has been involved in professional and academic activities relating to contemporary composition and music education.

As a composer, Cohen has worked across instrumental, electroacoustic, interactive, and multimedia forms. His compositions have been performed internationally by orchestras, ensembles, and soloists, including the SNU Symphony Orchestra in South Korea, the Vietnam National Symphony Orchestra, the Moscow Contemporary Music Ensemble, members of the BBC Scottish Symphony Orchestra, the Israel Contemporary Players, the Meitar Ensemble, and the Tel Aviv Soloists Ensemble. His works have appeared at festivals and international events including the Asian Composers League Festival, ISCM World New Music Days, the Electroacoustic Music Studies Network (EMS), and the International Conference on Technologies for Music Notation and Representation (TENOR).

Alongside his compositional practice, Cohen conducts interdisciplinary research involving musical creativity, music cognition, music and mathematics, performance studies, social and physiological synchronization, and computational approaches to musical analysis and creation. His research includes collaborations with scholars in psychology, mathematics, engineering, and the social sciences.

== Musical Style and Technology ==
Cohen's compositions explore relationships between acoustic sound, electronic transformation, algorithmic structures, and visual media. His work frequently combines instrumental performance with live electronics, fixed media, interactive systems, and technology-based notation. Computational analysis and digital sound processing are recurring elements of his artistic practice.

A significant focus of Cohen's recent work is Praat AudioTools, an open-source library for experimental composition, sound analysis, transformation, and resynthesis. Developed as an extension of the phonetic-analysis software Praat, the project comprises hundreds of scripts and tools for spectral processing, synthesis, sound transformation, spatial audio, algorithmic composition, and hybrid computational workflows.

The system uses acoustic-analysis objects, including PitchTiers, FormantGrids, and TextGrids, as editable musical structures. Its methodology emphasizes an iterative analysis–editing–rendering process, in which acoustic measurements and their computational representations can function as compositional materials.

Cohen described this approach in his 2026 peer-reviewed article "Praat Audiotools: An Offline Analysis–Resynthesis Toolkit for Experimental Composition", published in Organised Sound by Cambridge University Press.

The project also forms the basis of Cohen's book The Syntax of Sound: Praat AudioTools – An Offline Analysis–Resynthesis Toolkit for Experimental Composition, scheduled for publication by Springer in 2027.

Cohen's work in music technology also includes applications of artificial intelligence, algorithmic composition, interactive performance systems, and computational methods for investigating musical complexity and creativity.

== Selected Musical Works ==
=== Recent Works (2023–2026) ===
- Default Settings: Power of Attorney (Updated) (2026), after David Avidan. Commissioned by Geizhals and Einat Aronstein; performed at Studio Annette, Tel Aviv.
- The Necessary Prediction of the Unpredictable: A Prediction Machine That Fails Beautifully (2026), an interactive algorithmic installation presented at Bar-Ilan University.
- Fractured Radiance (2025), for flute, bass clarinet, piano, violin, and cello. Meitar Ensemble, Desert Sounds Festival.
- Manifesto (2025 performance), for piano trio and electronics. Meitar Ensemble, Studio Annette.
- Mise en abyme (2025), for bass clarinet and electronics. Ensemble L'Itinéraire, EMS 2025, Paris.
- Fragments of the Flood (2025), for trombone, harp, and electronics. Second Prize, Gilgamesh Composition Competition, Los Angeles.
- Don't Lose Focus (My Electronic Psychiatrist) (2025 performance), for flute, alto saxophone, and electronic media. Manhattan School of Music, USA.
- Around The Point (2025), for acoustic piano with a mechanical microtonal add-on, incorporating electronic technologies.
- The Myth of Trombonipus (2024), for jazz trombone, ensemble, and electronics. Commissioned by the Israel Contemporary Players.
- A Living Face Is Not Enough to Photograph With Words (2024), for string quartet, string orchestra, and fixed media. Tel Aviv Soloists Ensemble.
- Improbable Melodies (2024), for flute and computer, incorporating acoustic material derived from rock hyrax vocalizations.
- Remain Calm (2024), for soprano, flute, and electronics. Finalist at the Prix CIME 2025 International Electroacoustic Music Competition.
- The People of the Black Circle (2024), for ensemble, narrator, live electronics, fixed media, and video animation.
- Is P=NP? (2023), for voice, vibraphone, and Tibetan singing bowls.
- Points of Convergence (2023), for double bass using technology-based notation. Presented at TENOR, Boston.

=== Earlier Works ===
- Who Pulls the Strings? (2022), for electric guitar and string quartet. Commissioned by the Mivos Quartet.
- ER=EPR (2021), for French horn and live electronics. Selected for ISCM World New Music Days, China.
- Remez (2021), for trombone and piano. Winner of the V International Music Composition Competition, Royal Academy of Fine Arts of San Carlos, Valencia, Spain.
- Entanglement (2020), for conductor and interactive two-dimensional point map.
- Darkness (2020), for amplified ensemble, electronics, and video.
- Seven Cadenzas (2019), for string quartet and electronics. Commissioned by the Carmel Quartet.
- Noumenon (2019), for ensemble and audiovisual media. Commissioned by ISCM.
- I Heard a Fly Buzz... When I Died (2019), for ensemble and electronics.
- Echoes of Eternity (2009), for solo violin and orchestra. Performed by the Haifa Symphony Orchestra in 2023.

== Selected Publications ==
Cohen's academic publications include research on music technology, computational composition, musical creativity, music and mathematics, performance, and the psychological and physiological aspects of musical interaction.

=== Books ===
- Cohen, S. (2011). Music and Creation in a Computerized Environment. The Open University of Israel. 687 pages. ISBN 978-965-06-1271-9.
- Cohen, S. (forthcoming, 2027). The Syntax of Sound: Praat AudioTools – An Offline Analysis–Resynthesis Toolkit for Experimental Composition. Springer Nature. ISBN 978-981-92-2575-0.

=== Selected Research Articles ===
- Cohen, S. (2026). "Praat Audiotools: An offline analysis-resynthesis toolkit for experimental composition". Organised Sound. Cambridge University Press. doi:10.1017/S1355771826101204.
- Azaryahu, L., Broza, O., Cohen, S., Hershkovitz, S., & Adi-Japha, E. (2024). "Development of creative thinking via fractions and rhythm". Thinking Skills and Creativity, 52, 101514. doi:10.1016/j.tsc.2024.101514.
- Azaryahu, L., Broza, O., Cohen, S., Hershkovitz, S., & Adi-Japha, E. (2023). "Development of creative thinking patterns via math and music". Thinking Skills and Creativity, 47, 101196.
- Ornoy, E., & Cohen, S. (2022). "The effect of mindfulness meditation on the vocal proficiencies of music education students". Psychology of Music, 50(5), 1676–1695. doi:10.1177/03057356211062262.
- Gordon, I., Gilboa, A., Cohen, S., & Kleinfeld, T. (2020). "The relationship between physiological synchrony and motion energy synchrony during a joint group drumming task". Physiology & Behavior, 224, 113074.
- Ornoy, E., & Cohen, S. (2018). "Analysis of contemporary violin recordings of 19th century repertoire: Identifying trends and impacts". Frontiers in Psychology, 9, 2233. doi:10.3389/fpsyg.2018.02233.

== Honors and Awards ==
- 2026 – Research Excellence Award, Bar-Ilan University.
- 2025 – Finalist, Prix CIME International Electroacoustic Music Competition, for Remain Calm.
- 2025 – Second Prize, Gilgamesh Composition Competition, Los Angeles, for Fragments of the Flood.
- 2022 – Menachem Avidom Achievement Award, ACUM (Society of Authors, Composers and Music Publishers in Israel), for Darkness.
- 2021 – First Prize, V International Music Composition Competition, Royal Academy of Fine Arts of San Carlos, Valencia, Spain, for Remez.
- 2011 – Prime Minister's Prize for Music Achievement, Israel.
- 2011 – Aberdeen Music Prize, University of Aberdeen, Scotland, for Circles of Time.
- 2010 – Menachem Avidom Achievement Award, ACUM, for Echoes of Eternity.
