= Howard J. Buss =

American composer

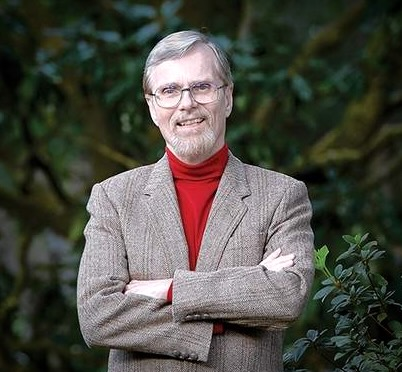
- Buss in July 2018
- Born: January 6, 1951 (age 75); Allentown, Pennsylvania, U.S.
- Occupation: Composer
- Era: Contemporary

Howard J. Buss (born January 6, 1951) is an American composer of contemporary classical music.

== Early life and education ==
Buss was born in Allentown, Pennsylvania, on January 6, 1951, the eldest of eight children. At age 14, he became a member of the Patriot Jazz Band in Allentown and joined the American Federation of Musicians, later becoming a member of the Marine Band of Allentown. Buss also toured as a trombonist with the Tijuana Brats; recording with them for R.C.A. Records and appearing with them on various television shows, such as The Tonight Show, The Mike Douglas Show, and The Jerry Lewis MDA Labor Day Telethon.

He attended Emmaus High School in Emmaus, Pennsylvania, where he graduated in 1968. He attended West Chester State College, where he received his Bachelor of Arts in applied music in 1972. In 1974, he studied with composer H. Owen Reed at Michigan State, where he received a Master of Music in trombone performance in 1975. In 1977, he received a Doctor of Musical Arts in composition from the University of Illinois.

== Career ==
In 1985, Buss established Brixton Publications and Howard J. Buss Publications. The companies were sold to Cimarron Music Press in October 2021.

Buss has received several awards, including the 2011 Lieksa Brass Week Composition Competition in Finland, the 2015 American Trombone Workshop National Composition Competition, and The American Prize.

== Personal life ==
He is married to Judy E. Buss, a musician and flutist.

== Selected works ==
- Currents for percussion quartet (1976)
- A Day in the City - 7 Vignettes for solo clarinet (1986)
- Fantasia for clarinet, flute and piano (1989)
- Incantation for trumpet & percussion (1994)
- Modern Times for narrator, flute, and four percussion (1995)
- Night Flight for piccolo, clarinet & piano (1995)
- Into Each Life for flute, cello, piano, and percussion (1998)
- Millennium Visions for clarinet and string quartet (2000)
- The World Within for B-flat clarinet and cello (2000)
- Scenes from the Holy Land for flute & percussion (2002)
- Overture for Percussion for narrator, flute and 4 percussion (2003)
- Atmospheres for trumpet & percussion (2005)
