= Aldo Rafael Forte =

American composer of Cuban descent

Aldo Rafael Forte (born 1953 in Havana, Cuba) is an American composer of Cuban descent.
