= Gilad Hochman =

Israeli composer (born 1982)

- גילעד הוכמן
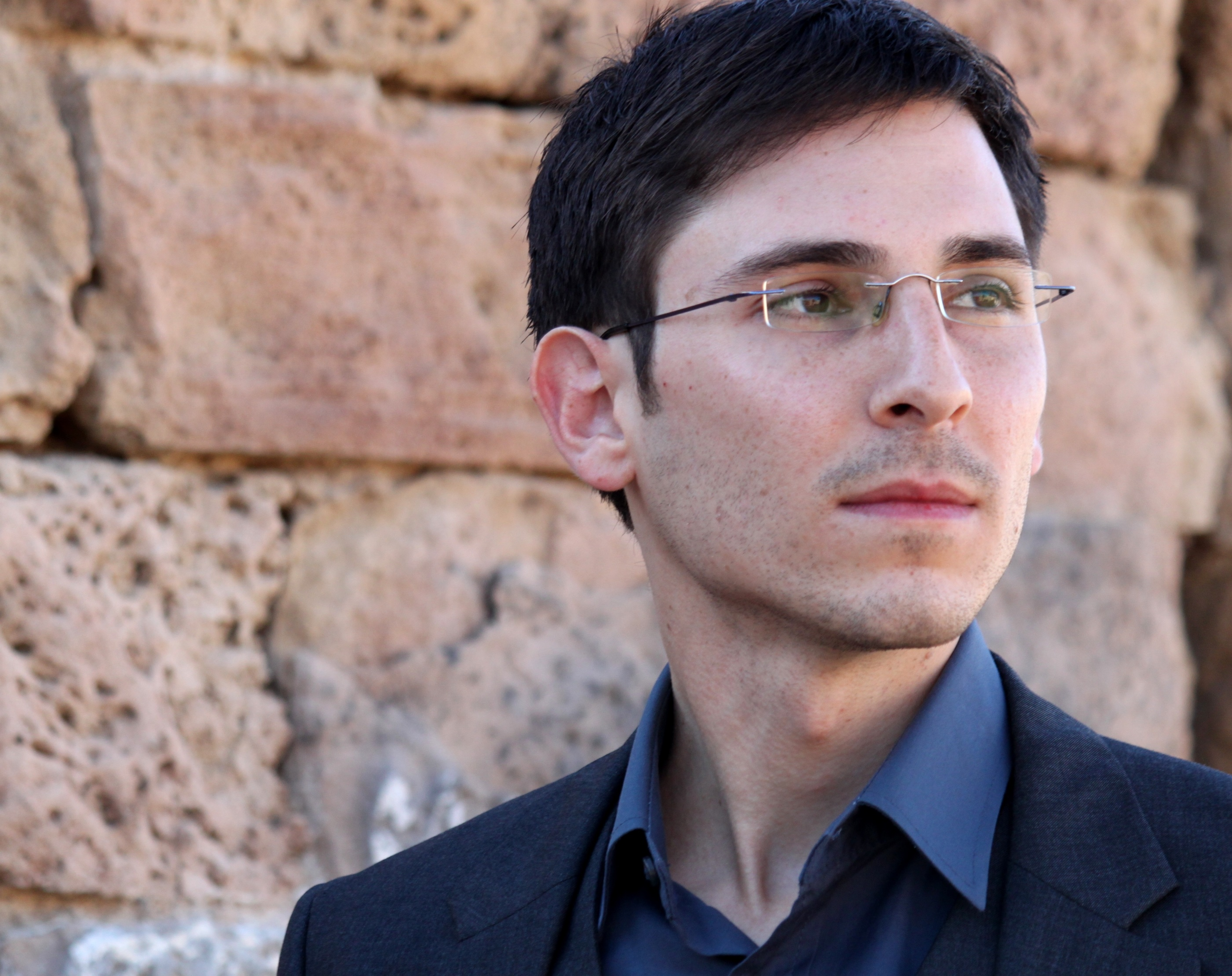
- Hochman in 2017
- Born: July 26, 1982 (age 44); Herzliya, Israel
- Education: Tel Aviv University – Buchmann-Mehta School of Music
- Occupation: Composer
- Years active: 2000–present
- Era: Contemporary
- Notable work: Nedudim (Wanderings); A Voice in the Wilderness; Suspended Reality; Polarizations
- Awards: Israeli Prime Minister's Award for Composers (2007); S&R Washington Award (2017); NC NewMusic Initiative Orchestral Prize (2023)
- Website: giladhochman.com

Gilad Hochman (Hebrew: גילעד הוכמן; born 26 July 1982 in Herzliya) is an Israeli composer of contemporary classical music based in Berlin, Germany.

His works blend European classical traditions with elements drawn from Jewish and Israeli musical cultures. His music has been reviewed in The New York Times, the BBC World Service, and France 24. Hochman is a graduate of Tel Aviv University's Buchmann-Mehta School of Music (BMSM) and recipient of the Israeli Prime Minister's Prize for Composers and the S&R Washington Award.

== Early life and education ==
Hochman was born in Herzliya, Israel, and began studying piano at age six and composing at age nine. He studied composition with Ilya Heifets at the Herzliya Municipal Conservatory, where he developed his earlier works. He later attended the Buchmann-Mehta School of Music at Tel Aviv University, where he studied composition with Gil Shohat and took courses in musicology and theory with some of Israel's most senior musicians. He graduated with honors in 2007.

== Career ==
Hochman was appointed Composer in Residence at the Ra'anana Symphonette Orchestra, and at age 24 became the youngest recipient of the Israeli Prime Minister's Award for Composers. His works have been commissioned and performed by orchestras, ensembles, choirs and soloists.

Hochman's music has been featured in the Heidelberg Biennale for New Music, the World Saxophone Congress, Aachen International Chorbiennale, Israel Music Fest, Festival de Chaillol, the Israeli Schubertiade, Musica Sacra Festival (Maastricht), Magister Ludi Festival (Moscow), Molyvos International Music Festival (Greece), and Summerwinds Festival Münster.

His works have been performed by RIAS Kammerchor, the Jerusalem Symphony Orchestra, Rishon LeZion Symphony Orchestra, Deutsches Kammerorchester Berlin, Tel Aviv Soloists Ensemble, Oriol Ensemble, Israeli Chamber Project, Meitar Ensemble, Musica Nova Ensemble, Sirenot Ensemble, Studium Chorale, Copenhagen Festival Ensemble, and the Israel Chamber Orchestra.

He has also received international performances at Carnegie Hall in New York, the Berlin Philharmonie, the Moscow Tchaikovsky Conservatory, St. James's Piccadilly in London, and the Henry Crown Symphony Hall in Jerusalem.

== Musical style and influences ==
Hochman's music combines classical European forms with Jewish and Israeli musical traditions, exploring a balance between emotional expression and structural clarity. His works often incorporate modal, tonal, and contemporary idioms. Critics have described his style as emotionally direct, intellectually rigorous, and deeply personal.

== Selected works ==
- Variations – for Solo Violin
- Rhapsody – for Solo Cello
- Akeda – for Solo Viola
- Polarizations – for Solo Viola
- Monologue – for Solo Saxophone
- Two Episodes – for Solo Mandolin
- Pia-no! – for Piano
- Momentango – for Viola, Bass and Piano
- Prayer without Words – for Saxophone and Harp
- Quest – for Saxophone and Piano
- Slightly Disturbed – Monodrama for Violin, Clarinet, and Cello
- Brief Memories – for String Trio
- The Creation – Septet for Soprano and Ensemble
- Lior – for Soprano and Ensemble
- River of Silence – for Soprano, Theorbo, and Percussion
- Whom My Soul Loveth – for Cello and Choir
- On the Verge of an Abyss – for Vocal Ensemble a Cappella
- Shedun Fini – for Clarinet, Cello, and Piano (Homage to Schubert's Symphony in B minor)
- Szymborska – for Women's Ensemble a Cappella
- Voice – for Violin and Large Ensemble
- Concertino – for String Orchestra and Flute Obbligato
- A Voice in the Wilderness – for Symphony Orchestra
- Nedudim (Wanderings) – Fantasia-Concertante for Mandolin and String Orchestra
- Suspended Reality – for Symphony Orchestra

== Reception ==
The New York Times praised Hochman's "gift for assembling musical gestures", while France 24 featured him as a "rising star in the classical music world." The BBC World Service presented a radio portrait of the composer in 2009, and Jewish Voice from Germany called his Nedudim – Wanderings "a miracle of a chamber piece."

== Awards ==
- Israeli Prime Minister's Award for Composers (2007)
- Chamber Orchestra of Colorado Springs 30th Anniversary Composition Competition, USA – 1st Prize (2014)
- S&R Washington Award, Washington D.C., USA (2017)
- Cambridge Chamber Singers Composition Competition, USA – 1st Prize (2018)
- Mandolin Composition Competition by Edition 49, Germany – 2nd Prize (2023)
- North Carolina NewMusic Initiative Orchestral Composition Competition, USA – 1st Prize (2024)
- American Viola Society – Gardner Competition for Composers, USA – 2nd Prize (2026)

== Grants ==
Hochman's work has received support from the Goethe-Institut, Austrian Cultural Forum, America-Israel Cultural Foundation, the Adele and John Gray Endowment Fund, Yehoshua Rabinovich Arts Foundation, Zfunot Tarbut, and the Ronen Arts Fund.

== See also ==
- Music of Israel
