= Jean-Marie Londeix =

French saxophonist (1932–2025)

- Londeix, in c. 1980
- Born: 20 September 1932; Libourne, France
- Died: 3 March 2025 (aged 92)
- Education: Conservatoire de Bordeaux; Conservatoire de Paris
- Occupations: Saxophonist; Composer; Academic teacher
- Organizations: Conservatoire de Dijon; Conservatoire de Bordeaux

Jean-Marie Londeix (20 September 1932 – 3 March 2025) was a French saxophonist, composer and academic teacher who studied saxophone, piano, harmony and chamber music.

== Life and career ==
Born in Libourne, Londeix began his saxophone study with bassoonist Jules Ferry at the Conservatoire de Bordeaux. He later studied with Marcel Mule at the Paris Conservatory. He also studied with Fernand Oubradous and Norbert Dufourcq, among others. He then served as the saxophone instructor at the Conservatory of Dijon for 18 years. He retired from the Conservatoire de Bordeaux, France in 2001.

Londeix won an international saxophone competition at the age of 15.

He was the founder of the "French Saxophonists Association" and the "International Saxophone Committee."

More than 100 compositions have been written specifically for him, and he has published several pedagogical works. Some famous saxophone players who have studied with him include Matthew Patnode, Richard Dirlam, Perry Rask, Russell Peterson, Ryo Noda, Jan Baker, James Umble, Robert Black, Susan Fancher, Ross Ingstrup, William Street, Christian Lauba and Jack Kripl (winner of the prize for Saxophone at the International Competition for Musical Performers in Geneva Switzerland, 1970).

Londeix died on 3 March 2025, at the age of 92.

== Teaching career ==
Selected former students:

- Marie-Bernadette Charrier
- Susan Cook
- Mark Engebretson
- Susan Fancher
- Jean-Michel Goury
- Ryō Noda
- Wallace Halladay

== Works written for Jean-Marie Londeix ==
Selected works:

Denisov, Edison: Concerto piccolo (1977); Sonate (1970) premiered at the 1970 World Saxophone Congress

Dubois, Pierre-Max: Concerto (1959), Hommage à Hoffnung (1980), Le Lièvre et la Tortue--Impromptu (1957), Pièces caractéristiques(1962)

Noda, Ryo: Don Quichotte, op. 2; Improvisation I (1972), Improvisation II (1973); Improvisation III (1974)

Robert, Lucie: Strophes (1978)

Rossé, François: Le frène égaré (1978–79). Etude en balance, Lobuk constrictor (1982), Spath (1981)

Sauguet, Henri: L'arbre (1976–80), Oraisons (1976), Sonatine bucolique (1964)

Ciccone, Marco: "Mélodie pour Jean-Marie Londeix" for soprano saxophone, harp and strings (2013)

== Bibliography ==
- "Jean-Marie Londeix :"Un dédain suicidaire"" in 88 notes pour piano solo, Jean-Pierre Thiollet, Neva Editions, 2015. p. 136-138. ISBN 978 2 3505 5192 0
