= Jean-Baptiste Singelée =

Belgian composer

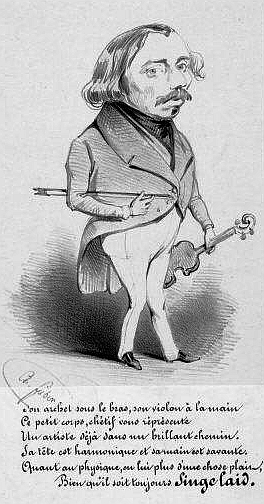
Jean-Baptiste Singelée

Jean-Baptiste Singelée (25 September 1812 in Brussels – 29 September 1875 in Oostende) was a Belgian classical composer of the romantic period.

Jean-Baptiste Singelée was born in Brussels and studied at the Royal Conservatoire there. He was the violin soloist at the Théâtre Royal de la Monnaie and directed orchestras there and in Ghent. Singelée was one of the first composers to treat the saxophone as a serious classical instrument, evidenced by his composing over 30 Solos de Concours for saxophone and his students at the Paris Conservatory.

As a longtime friend of Adolphe Sax, the inventor of the saxophone (they met as students at the Royal School of Music), he encouraged Sax to develop the four principal members of the saxophone family, and composed what is very likely the first work ever written for the saxophone quartet, his Premier Quatuor, Op. 53, completed in 1857. In addition to his saxophone works, Singelée is credited with composing 12 concertos, many solo works for violin and other instruments as well as music for ballet.

== Selected works ==
3er Solo de Concert
Performed by Wasei Dúo

Adagio et Rondo Op. 63 for tenor saxophone and piano
Performed by Wasei Dúo

His compositions include:

- Quartet for Saxophones No. 1, Op. 53
- Duo concertant for soprano saxophone, alto saxophone and piano, Op. 55
- Fantaisie pastorale for soprano saxophone and piano, Op. 56
- Concerto for tenor saxophone and piano, Op. 57
- Concertino for alto saxophone and piano, Op. 78
- Solo de Concert for alto saxophone and piano, Op. 83
- Fantaisie brillante for alto saxophone and piano, Op. 87
- Septième solo de concert, Op. 93
