= Charles Rochester Young =

American musician

Charles Rochester Young (1965) is an American composer, music educator, conductor and saxophonist.

== Life ==
Young graduated from Baylor University in Waco (Texas), where in 1988 he earned his Bachelor of Music. He then studied at the University of Michigan in Ann Arbor and earned his Master of Music in 1990. In 1993 he completed his studies with a promotion to Doctor of Musical Arts. His teachers have included Leslie Bassett, Donald Sinta, Keith Hill and Marianne Ploger. He soon became a teacher at the Interlochen Center for the Arts. Subsequently, he became Professor of Composition and Music Theory at the University of Wisconsin at Stevens Point. He was their head of the composition and music theory. He was the Associate Dean of the Baldwin Wallace Conservatory of Music from 2016 until 2022. Currently, he is serving as the Dean of the School of Music at the University of North Carolina at Greensboro.

In 1999 he was appointed by the Carnegie Foundation and the Council for the Advancement and Support of Education to "Wisconsin Professor of the Year" proclaimed.

As a composer he has won several awards including first prize in the National Flute Association Competition New Publications and first prize in the National Band Association / Merrill Jones Composition Competition. He was a prizewinner at the Vienna Modern Masters Competition. His works have been performed at well-known conferences and festivals around the world, such the World Harp Congress, the World Saxophone Congress, the Conference of the World Association of Symphonic Band and Ensembles (WASBE), the Midwest Band and Orchestra Clinic, the Music Educators National Convention, and the Montreux Jazz Festival.

== Compositions ==
=== Works for Orchestra ===
- 1997 Fanfare to the Northern Sky, for orchestra
- 1998 Wings of Fire, for solo flute, solo harp, and string orchestra
  1. Ascent from the Ashes
  2. Flights of Fancy

=== Works for Band ===
- 1997 Tempered Steel, for band
- 1998 Northern Lights, for large brass ensemble (3 trumpets, 4 horns, 2 trombones, bass trombone, euphonium, tuba) and 3 groups of percussion (I: crotales and glockenspiel; II: vibraphone, suspended cymbal, large tamtam; III: large triangle, bass drum) (This work is identical to Fanfare to the Northern Sky for orchestra)
- 1999 Legends of the Northern Wind, for band
- 2000 A Child’s Embrace, for band
- 2000 Springtime Heralds, for band
- 2001 Concert, for double bass and brass
  1. Fantasia
  2. Chaccone
  3. Gigue
- 2003 Concert, for alto saxophone and band
- 2003 With Honor and Praise, for band
- 2003 Of Spirit and Splendor, for band
- 2003 Songs Without Words, for band
- 2004 In the Evening Quiet , for band
- 2005 Ancient Blessings, for band
  1. Rite
  2. Wedding Dance
- 2005 Noble Deeds, for band
- 2006 Galop, for band
- 2007 Where the Waters Gather, for band
- 2007 Let these words ring true, for narrator and band
- 2008 Concert, for flute and band
- 2009 Variations, for piano and band

=== Chamber works ===
- 1986 Diversions, for soprano saxophone and piano
- 1987 Two Movements, for brass quintet
- 1987 Sonata, for soprano saxophone and piano
- 1988 Saxophone Quartet
  1. Fantasia
  2. Ritual
  3. Incantations
- 1989 The Song of the Lark, for flute and harp
- 1989 rev.1992 Excursions, for alto saxophone and marimba
- 1989 October in the Rain, for electronic wind controller and mixed chamber ensemble (synthesizer, horn acoustic piano, percussion (suspended cymbal, wind chimes))
- 1992 Shish-K-Bop, for saxophone quartet
- 1993 The Warmth of You, for saxophone quartet
- 1993 Double Vision, for soprano saxophone and piano
- 1993 Wedding Fugue, for saxophone quartet
- 1994 Sahib Supreme, for saxophone quartet
- 1995 Lullaby for a Mourning Child, for clarinet (or soprano saxophone) and percussion
- 1997 Cross Currents, for oboe, soprano saxophone, and marimba
- 1997 Backtalk! A comedy, for narrator and prepared wind instrument
- 1999 Festivities, for two marimbas
- 2000 Three Summer Evenings, for brass quintet
- 2002 Variations on an Original Theme, for violin, clarinet, and piano
- 2002 Nocturne, for flute and vibraphone
- 2003 Remembrance, for double bass and piano
- 2005 Callings, for horn quartet
