= Bertold Hummel =

German composer

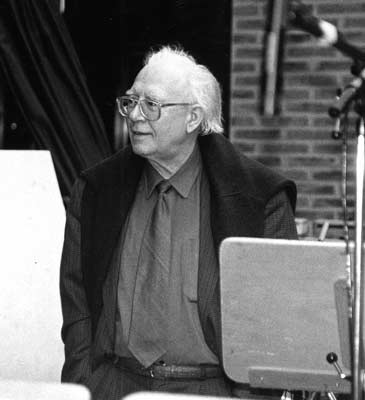
- Born: 27 November 1925; Hüfingen
- Died: 9 August 2002 (aged 76); Würzburg
- Occupation: Composer

Bertold Hummel (27 November 1925 – 9 August 2002) was a German composer of modern classical music.

== Life ==
Bertold Hummel was born in Hüfingen, Baden. He studied at the Academy of Music in Freiburg from 1947 to 1954, taking composition with Harald Genzmer, and cello with Atis Teichmanis. He toured as a cellist and composer between 1954 and 1956, worked as choirmaster in Freiburg, as well as for the Südwestrundfunk Baden-Baden broadcasting station from 1956 to 1963. He became a teacher of composition at Würzburg in 1963 where he directed the Studio for New Music for the next 25 years. After becoming a professor in 1974, he was president of the Würzburg College of Music from 1979 to 1987 (and was an honorary president after 1988), and in 1982 he became a member of the Bavarian Academy of Fine Arts. Hummel travelled as a guest lecturer, and received performances of his work in countries all over the world. He died on 9 August 2002 in Würzburg.

== Awards ==
In 1956, Hummel received a scholarship from the Federal Association of German Industry. In 1960, the city of Stuttgart awarded him a prize in composition. He was given the Robert Schumann prize in Düsseldorf in 1961. In 1968, he received a scholarship from the Cité des arts internationale of Paris. In 1988, the city of Würzburg awarded him a cultural prize. He won the Friedrich Baur Prize of the Bavarian Academy of the Fine Arts in 1996 and the Culture Prize of the German Catholics in 1998.

== Major works ==
- Oratorio: The Shrine of the Martyrs (Op. 90, 1989)
- Chamber Opera: The Emperor's New Clothes (Op. 10, 1955)
- Ballet:
  - Episodes (Op. 23, 1962)
  - The Last Flower (Op. 55a, 1975)
  - Scenes from Faust (Op. 72a, 1979)
- Symphonies:
  - Symphony No. 1 for strings (Op. 20, 1959)
  - Symphony No. 2 "Reverenza" (Op. 30, 1966)
  - Symphony No. 3 "Jeremiah" (Op.100, 1996)
- Visions for large orchestra, after the Apocalypse of St. John the Evangelist (Op. 73, 1980)
- Sinfonietta for large wind orchestra (Op. 39, 1970)
- Concerto for percussion and orchestra (Op. 70, 1978)
- Eight fragments from letters of Vincent van Gogh (Op. 84, 1985)

5 masses; cantatas; motets; song-cycles; chamber music; organ works; electronic compositions and music for children.
