= Ryō Noda =

Japanese composer and musician (born 1948)

Ryō Noda 野田燎
- Born: 1948 (age 77–78); Amagasaki, Kansai, Hyōgo, Japan
- Occupations: Composer; musician
- Instrument: Saxophone
- Awards: SACEM Composition Prize (1973); Osaka Prefecture Gold Award (1986); Grand Prix of the Yamaha Electone Festival (1989)
- Education: Osaka College of Music
- Known for: Musico-Kinetic Therapy

Ryō Noda (野田燎, Noda Ryo; born 1948) is a Japanese composer and musician who has written classical works for the saxophone. He developed Musico-Kinetic Therapy, a therapy method used in NeuroRehabilitation which blends physiology, medicine, and music. He has received accolades, including the SACEM Composition Prize.

== History ==
Noda was born in 1948 in Amagasaki, Japan. He graduated from the Osaka College of Music as a saxophonist, then pursued advanced music studies at Northwestern University under Frederick Hemke and at the Bordeaux Conservatory under Jean-Marie Londeix. He is a composer of Japanese saxophone music, and his repertoire also includes Western music of the baroque, classical, and romantic periods.

He was twice awarded the Osaka City Art Festival Prize, and in 1986, he won the Osaka Prefecture Gold Award. He received the Grand Prix of the Yamaha Electone Festival in 1989 and the SACEM Composition Prize in 1973.

== Selected works ==
Noda's saxophone compositions include:

- Gen – Concerto for Alto Saxophone
- Improvisation I, II, and III – based on shakuhachi playing
- La Nuit de Dinant
- Mai – Paris 1975, for solo saxophone
- Murasaki No Fuchi – for saxophone duet (A–A or S–T)
- Phoenix
- Requiem (Shin Én) – for solo saxophone
