= Hemke Concerto =

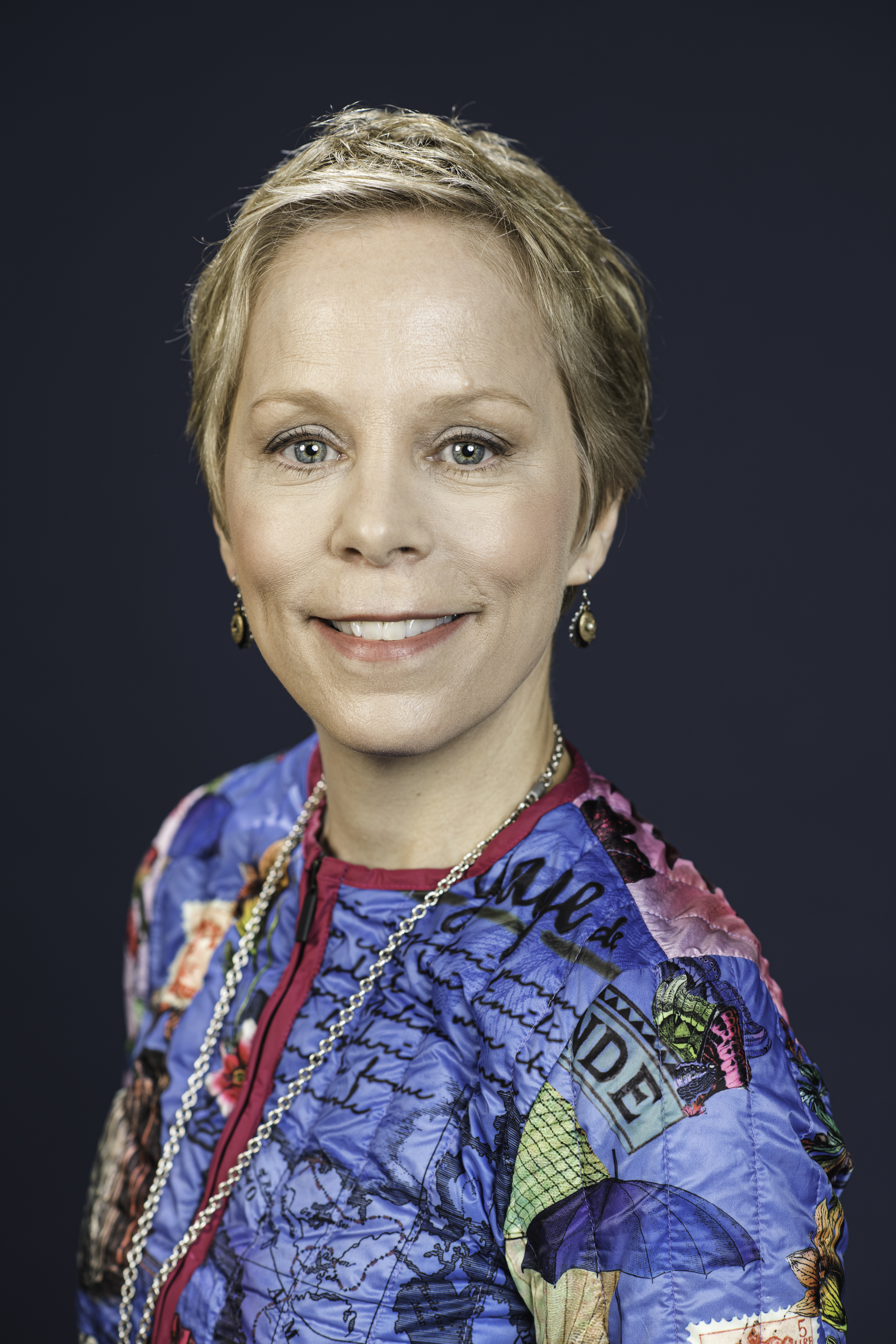
Augusta Read Thomas in 2020

The Hemke Concerto "Prisms of Light" is a concerto for solo alto saxophone and orchestra by the American composer Augusta Read Thomas. The work was commissioned as a retirement gift for the saxophonist and educator Frederick Hemke by many of his students and colleagues. It was given its world premiere by Hemke and the New Haven Symphony Orchestra under the conductor William Boughton in New Haven, Connecticut, on February 27, 2014. A version for band was premiered by Taimur Sullivan and the Navy Band at the 2019 International Saxophone Symposium.

== Structure ==
The Hemke Concerto has a duration of roughly 22 minutes and is composed in four connected movements:

1. Illuminations
2. Sunrise Ballad
3. Chasing Radiance
4. Solar Rings

== Instrumentation ==
The work is scored for solo alto saxophone and an orchestra comprising piccolo, two flutes, two oboes, two clarinets, bassoon, two horns, two trumpets, trombone, bass trombone, tuba, four percussionists, piano, harp, celesta, and strings.
