= Jascha Gurewich =

Early classical saxophone soloist

Jascha Gurewich (July 4, 1896, Pruzhany, Belarus - September 30, 1938, New York, NY) American composer and saxophonist who was a member of John Philip Sousa's band, a noted solo performer, and a composer of works for saxophone. Gurewich played a significant role in the popularization of the saxophone in the early 20th-century.

== Biography ==
Gurewich served in the American Expeditionary Forces during World War I, a fact mentioned frequently in coverage of his concert appearances after the war. J. Windsor, writing a review of an Aeolian Hall performance in 1925, wrote in The National Monthly Trade Journal of the Musical Merchandise Industry, "His mastery of the instrument was interrupted by the war, as he went overseas with the American forces, but he succeeded, despite the obstacles of active duty at the front, in demonstrating proficiency that won him recognition."

=== Influence on Classical Music and Popularization of the Saxophone ===
Gurewich is among a small group of performers who began to change opinion on the saxophone with the classical concert establishment during the 1920s. Jacob's Orchestra Monthly described Gurewich in 1924, as "... the saxophone virtuoso who jostled New York's intellectual snobs out of their smugness by playing on that much maligned instrument an original concerto (Opus 102) and chamber music at Aeolian Hall last March." The article continued, "Many music lovers, especially those whose aversion to the saxophone has been based on nothing but unfamiliarity with the instrument, came away with a decided change of opinion."

Famous during his time as a saxophone soloist in Sousa's band, Gurewich was promoted as the "Heifitz of the Saxophone." During Gurewich's year as soloist with the band (1920-21), Sousa regarded the soloist´s abilities as exceptional. Sousa was quoted as saying to Gurewich, "I have heard all the finest saxophone players of the past thirty years, and the majority of them have played for me; but I have never heard anyone to equal you."

Gurewich performed regularly on tour and extensively on radio broadcasts. He played Carnegie Hall, December 9, 1923 in what The Music Trade Review called, "...the first saxophone recital in American musical history at Carnegie Hall ..."

In 1923, Gurewich performed with noted saxophonist Kathryne Thompson in Southern California under the billing Jascha Gurewich and the Southern California Saxophone Band. Gurewich wrote a short piece, "Kathryne" in Thompson's honor which he often performed with her.

In February 1926, Gurewich performed as soloist at the Boston Saxophone Orchestra's second public performance in Boston's Symphony Hall. The ensemble, created by Boston Symphony Orchestra bassoonist and saxophonist, Abdon Laus, featured as many as 85 saxophones performing at a time, performing classical transcriptions.

In November 1931, Gurewich was a member of the ensemble accompanying modern dancer Helen Tamiris at The Guild Theatre in New York.

=== Buescher Saxophone Promotional Tour ===
In 1923, Gurewich undertook an extensive national promotional tour sponsored by the Buescher Band Instrument Company of Elkhart, Indiana and tied to Gurewich's vaudeville bookings. An article in The Music Trade Review described the promotion, "The campaign embodies a series of local tie-ups with the appearances in each city of Jascha Gurewich, the world-famous saxophonist, who is playing the Buescher saxophone on a coast-to-coast vaudeville tour ... Gurewich has appeared in as many as twenty Buescher dealers' stores since the first of January ... In the first place, Jascha Gurewich is a saxophone artist of the first rank. When he appears at a vaudeville house he never fails to give a striking demonstration of the artistic capabilities of the saxophone. This undoubtedly stimulates a lively interest in the saxophone and they are anxious to hear him again, so when the recital at the dealer's store is advertised they flock to the store."

== Compositions ==
Gurewich´s Concerto, opus 102 (performed circa 1923, published in 1925), was dedicated to Sousa; it is still available from the Rubank Company. The piece was described as the "only known saxophone concerto" in a notice prior to his 1926 Aeolian Hall recital in 1926.

Gurewich composed primarily for the alto and C-Melody saxophones.

A partial list of Gurewich composed works:

- Fantasia for Saxophone and Piano (1924)
- Concerto for Alto Saxophone and Orchestra, Opus 102 (first performed 1923, published 1925)
- Sixteen Artistic Studies, For alto saxophone; Scores featuring the alto saxophone; For 1 player, London: Lawrence Wright (1926)
- Sonata for Saxophone and Piano (1928)
- Capriccio, Opus 120 (1928)
- Presto, from Suite for Alto Saxophone
- Emily (Valse Fantasie)
- Laughing Gas (Jazz Encore)
- Maqueda (Jazz Encore)
- Passing Thought
- Souvenir De Chamonix (A Dream of the Alps)
- The New Palestine: National March
- Ballet Fantastique
- Czardas
- Habanera
- Laughing Hyena
- Melodie d'Amour
- Seventeen Classic Duets
- Suite Orientale
