= Walter S. Hartley =

American composer (1927–2016)

Walter Sinclair Hartley (February 21, 1927 – June 30, 2016) was an American composer of contemporary classical music.

== Life and career ==
He was born in Washington, D.C., began composing at age five and became seriously dedicated to it at sixteen. All his college degrees are from the Eastman School of Music of the University of Rochester. He received his Ph.D. in composition there in 1953. Some of his teachers were Burrill Phillips, Thomas Canning, Herbert Elwell, Bernard Rogers, Howard Hanson and Dante Fiorillo.

He and the former Sandra Mount married June 17, 1960; the couple is survived by two daughters and five grandchildren.

Hartley was Professor Emeritus of Music at the State University of New York at Fredonia in Fredonia, New York. He also taught piano, theory and composition at the National Music Camp (now Interlochen Arts Camp) in Interlochen, Michigan from 1956 to 1964. He then became composer-in-residence at the University of North Carolina at Charlotte located in Charlotte, North Carolina until his death.

== List of compositions ==
His list of compositions and arrangements is over 300, dating from 1949 on, and most of these are published. He was a member of the American Society of Composers, Authors and Publishers (ASCAP), from which he received an annual award for achievement in serious music since 1962.

His music has been performed by many ensembles, including the National Symphony Orchestra, Oklahoma City Symphony, Eastman-Rochester Orchestra and the Eastman Wind Ensemble. His Chamber Symphony of 1954 was commissioned by the Koussevitzky Foundation; his Concert Overture for orchestra received a prize from the National Symphony Orchestra in 1955; and his Sinfonia No. 3 for brass choir won for him the 1964 Conn Award. Since then, he had received many commissions from college and high school musical organizations. A lately published orchestral work, Symphony No. 3, was commissioned by the Greater Buffalo (New York) Youth Orchestra; several band works were commissioned by U.S. service bands. There have been many recordings.

He wrote Concerto for 23 Winds at the age of thirty in 1957.

Hartley was also considered one of the most prolific composers of music for the saxophone.

Catalogue of works

1949

- Ballet Music for orchestra (or two pianos) (publ. Wingert-Jones)
- Improvisations for piano (manuscript)
- Prologue and March for band (publ. Wingert-Jones) [excerpted and arranged from Ballet Music]

1950

- Quartet for Woodwinds (publ. Wingert-Jones)
- Sinfonietta for orchestra (publ. Wingert-Jones)
- Sonata da Camera for Solo Trombone, Oboe, 2 Clarinets and Bassoon (publ. Wingert-Jones)
- String Quartet No. 1 (publ. Wingert-Jones)

1951

- Arioso for Trombone and Piano (publ. Wingert-Jones)
- Concertino for Flute, Trombone, Percussion, Piano and 12 strings (publ. Wingert-Jones)
- Sonata for violin and piano (publ. Wingert-Jones)
- Suite for 5 Winds for flute, oboe, clarinet, trombone and alto saxophone (publ. Wingert-Jones)
- Three Patterns for [chamber] orchestra (publ. Wingert-Jones)
- Triptych for orchestra (publ. Wingert-Jones)

1952

- Concerto (No. 1) for Piano and orchestra (publ. Wingert-Jones)
- Elegy for strings (publ. Wingert-Jones)
- Prelude and Dance for 3 cellos (publ. Wingert-Jones)
- Sonatina for Trumpet and [chamber] orchestra (or piano) (publ. Accura) [also in version with band accompaniment, arr. Bullock]
- Three Piano Pieces (manuscript)

1953

- Sonata for Viola and piano (publ. Wingert-Jones)
- Trio for Strings (Violin, Viola, Cello) (publ. Wingert-Jones)

1954

- Carillon for piano (manuscript)
- Chamber Symphony for [chamber] orchestra (publ. ECS)
- Concert Overture for orchestra (publ. Wingert-Jones)
- How Excellent Thy Name for SATB chorus (manuscript)
- Two Songs of Blake for medium-high voice and piano (manuscript)

1955

- Sonata (No. 1) in A for piano (manuscript)

1956

- Divertimento for Cello Solo and Woodwind Quintet (publ. Wingert-Jones)
- Jota from "Blood Wedding" for piano (manuscript)
- Meditation and Dance from "Blood Wedding" for violin and harp (publ. Wingert-Jones)
- Quintet Movement for clarinet and string quartet (publ. Wingert-Jones)
- Scenes from Lorca's "Blood Wedding" for orchestra (publ. Wingert-Jones)

1957

- Concerto for 23 Winds (for standard orchestral winds and brass) (publ. Accura)
- Sonatina for tuba and piano (publ. Wingert-Jones)

1958

- Sonata Concertante for trombone and piano (publ. Wingert-Jones)
- Two Pieces for Woodwind Quintet (publ. Wingert-Jones)

1959

- Little Duet for piano 4 hands (manuscript)
- Sonatina for Flute (publ. Wingert-Jones)
- Three Duets for Violin and Viola (publ. Wingert-Jones)
- Two Little Pieces for Clarinet (publ. Wingert-Jones)

1960

- Chamber Music for Alto Saxophone and Woodwind Quintet (publ. Wingert-Jones)
- Miniature Suite for piano (manuscript)
- Orpheus for brass quintet (publ. Wingert-Jones)
- Orpheus With his Lute for SATB chorus (manuscript)
- Rondo for Winds and Percussion (publ. Wingert-Jones)
- Suite for Flute and Piano (publ. Wingert-Jones)
- Trio for Violin, Cello and Piano (publ. Wingert-Jones)

1961

- Fantasia for Flute and Piano (publ. Wingert-Jones)
- Petite Suite for Alto Saxophone (publ. Wingert-Jones)
- Sinfonia No. 1 for band (publ. Wingert-Jones)
- Two Pieces for piano (manuscript)

1962

- Duet for Tuba and Flute (publ. Presser)
- Elizabethan Dances for orchestra (publ. Wingert-Jones)
- Introit and Choral Amen for chorus (publ. Accura)
- String Quartet No. 2 (publ. ECS)
- Suite for tuba (publ. Presser)

1963

- Festive Music for orchestra (publ. Wingert-Jones)
- Quintet No. 1 for brass quintet (publ. Presser)
- Serenade for Woodwind Quintet and String bass (publ. Wingert-Jones)
- Sinfonia No. 3 for brass choir (publ. Presser)

1964

- Duo for Alto Saxophone and Piano (publ. Presser)
- Four Sketches for flute and piano (publ. Presser)
- Psalm for Strings (publ. Kalmus/Masters)
- Partita for [chamber] orchestra (publ. ECS)

1965

- Divertissement for brass quintet (publ. Ensemble)
- Prelude and Fanfare for organ (publ. Presser)
- Sinfonia No. 4 for band (publ. Wingert-Jones)
- Sonata for Flute and Harpsichord (publ. Presser)

1966

- Concerto for 3 Trombones and band (publ. Ensemble)
- Concerto No. 1 for Saxophone and band (or piano) (publ. Presser)
- Three Dances after Telemann for Flute and Tuba (publ. Ensemble)
- Three Pieces for Oboe (publ. Accura)

1967

- Aria for Tuba and piano (publ. Presser)
- Caprice for trumpet and piano (publ. Ensemble)
- O Sing a New Song for SATB chorus (manuscript)
- Poem for Tenor Saxophone and piano (publ. Presser)
- Psalm Cycle for medium-high voice, flute and piano (Presser)
- Sonata for tuba and piano (publ. Presser)
- They That Put Their Trust for chorus and opt. organ (manuscript)

1968

- Sinfonietta for band (publ. Philharmusica)
- Solemn Music for brass quartet and brass choir (manuscript)
- Sonata No. 2 for piano (publ. Presser)

1969

- Canzona for 8 trombones (publ. Ensemble)
- Capriccio for Trombone and band (publ. Philharmusica)
- Concertino for Trumpet and small wind ensemble (publ. Philharmusica)
- Concertino for Tuba and small wind ensemble (publ. Presser)
- Double Concerto for Alto Saxophone and Tuba and Wind Octet (publ. Philharmusica)
- Sonata Breve for Bass trombone (publ. Presser)

1970

- Symphony No. 1 for band (publ. ECS)
- Te Deum (No. 2 from 5 Canticles) for Baritone solo, SATB chorus and band (publ. Accura)
- Two Pastiches for trumpet, horn and trombone (publ. Philharmusica)
- Venite (No. 1 from 5 Canticles) for SATB chorus and band (publ. Accura)

1971

- Bivalve Suite for Euphonium and tuba (publ. Philharmusica)
- Jubilate Deo (No. 5 from 5 Canticles) for chorus, soloists and band (publ. Accura)
- Magnificat (No. 3 from 5 Canticles) for SSAA chorus, soprano solo and band (publ. Accura)
- Nunc Dimittis (No. 4 from 5 Canticles) for TTBB chorus, Tenor solo and band (publ. Accura)
- Partita for winds (for wind ensemble, no percussion) (publ. Accura)

1972

- Antiphony for Brass Choir and Band (publ. Accura)
- Song (from Southern Tier Suite) for alto saxophone and piano (publ. Presser)
- Sonorities for Tuba and Piano (publ. Philharmusica)
- Southern Tier Suite for Band (publ. Presser)
- Suite for SATB Saxophones (publ. Philharmusica)
- Two Anthems for TTBB chorus and organ (publ. Bardic)

1973

- In Memoriam for band (publ. Accura)
- Music for Tuba Solo (publ. Philharmusica)
- Variations for orchestra (publ. Wingert-Jones)

1974

- Concerto for Tuba and Percussion Orchestra (publ. Accura)
- Largo for tuba and piano (publ. Philharmusica)
- Little Suite for baritone saxophone and piano (publ. Dorn)
- The Saxophone Album for SATB saxophones and piano (publ. Presser)
- Sonata for tenor saxophone and piano (puybl. Dorn)

1975

- Bacchanalia for band (publ. Accura)
- Chorale "Ach Gott und Herr (Nicolai-Bach, arranged for saxophones: SAATBBass) (publ. Dorn)
- Chorale "Wachet Auf" (Nicolai-Bach, arranged for saxophones: SAATBBass) (publ. Dorn)
- Fantasia for Brass and Percussion (publ. Accura) [Published with Prelude for Brass and Scherzo for Tuned Percussion as "Music for Brass and Percussion"]
- Love Song of the Bride for soprano and piano (publ. Bardic)
- Metamorphoses for clarinet and piano (publ. Ethos)
- Octet for saxophones (SAAATTBBass) (publ. Dorn)
- Saturday Afternoon (vocalise) for soprano or alto and vibraphone (manuscript)
- Sonorities II for horn and piano (publ. Presser)
- Three Modes for piano (manuscript)

1976

- Miniatures for 4-Valve Instruments (2 Euphoniumns, 2 Tubas) (publ. ECS)
- Prelude for Brass and Drums (brass choir and percussion) (Publ. Accura) [Published with Prelude for Brass and Scherzo for Tuned Percussion as "Music for Brass and Percussion"]
- Saxophrenia for Alto Saxophone and Band (or piano) (publ. Dorn)
- Scherzo for Tuned Percussion (timpani, mallets) (publ. Accura) [Published with Prelude for Brass and Scherzo for Tuned Percussion as "Music for Brass and Percussion"]
- Sonata for Baritone Saxophone and piano (publ. Dorn)
- Sonatina for piano (manuscript)
- Sonorities III for Trombone and Piano (publ. Presser)
- Sonorities IV for alto saxophone and piano (publ. Dorn)
- Two Pieces for Euphonium and piano (publ. Presser)

1977

- Quartet for Reeds (Oboe, clarinet alto saxophone and bassoon (publ. Dorn)
- Quintet No. 2 for brass quintet (publ. Dorn)
- Sinfonia No 5 for band (publ. Accura)
- Sonorities V for trumpet and organ (publ. Presser)
- Three Preludes for piano (publ. Bardic)
- Tricinia for 3 trombones (publ. Presser)
- Tuba Rose (Polka) for tuba and piano (publ. Presser)

1978

- Concertino for Tenor Saxophone and Band (or piano) (publ. Dorn)
- Sonorities VI for Bassoon and Harpsichord (publ. Presser)
- Symphony No. 2 for band (publ. Accura)
- Valse Vertigo for alto saxophone and piano (publ. Dorn)

1979

- Diversions for soprano saxophone and piano (publ. Ethos)
- Meditation for horn and piano (publ. Presser)
- Quartet for Brass (cornet, horn, euphonium, tuba) (publ. Presser)
- Rhapsody Tenor Saxophone and strings (or string quartet) (publ. Dorn)
- Sonata Euphonica for Euphonium and piano (publ. Presser)

1980

- Euphonium Concerto for Euphonium and orchestra (or band or piano) (publ. Accura)

1981

- Coast Guard Overture for band (publ. Accura)
- Quintet for Saxophones (SAATB) (publ. Dorn)

1982

- Concertante for Timpani and orchestra (or band) (publ. ECS)

1983

- Catskill Suite for band (publ. Accura)
- Shall I Compare Three for medium high voice and piano (publ. Bardic)
- Suite for Diverse Trumpets (6 trumpets) (publ. Presser)
- Symphony No. 3 for orchestra (publ. ECS)

1984

- Antiphonal Prelude for SATB saxophones and organ (publ. Ethos)
- Cantilena for alto saxophone and marimba (publ. Ethos)
- Suite for Clarinet, trumpet and piano (publ. Ehtos)
- Trio for Saxophones (ATB) (publ. Presser)
- Two Dances: Rag Tango, Slow Drag for Clarinet, Trumpet and Piano (publ. ECS)

1985

- Aubade for SAATBBass saxophones (publ. Ethos)
- Dance Suite for violin, alto saxophone and piano (pubnl. Ethos)
- Sinfonia No. 6 for saxophones (SSAAAATTBBBass) (publ. Ethos)
- Solemn Postlude for SATB saxophones and organ (publ. Ethos)
- Sonorities VII for Tenor Saxophone and piano (publ. Ethos)
- Toccata Concertante for SATB saxophones and organ (publ. Ethos)

1986

- Duet-Sonatina for Alto and Tenor Saxophones (publ. Ethos)
- Four Fugues of Anton Reicha for SAATBBass saxophones (arrangement, publ. Ethos)
- Hymn from "A Rustic Wedding" (Franz Berwald, arranged for SAATBBass saxophones) (publ. Ethos)
- Scherzino for tenor saxophone and piano (publ. Ethos)
- Sinfonia No. 7 for orchestra (publ. Kalmus/Masters)

1987

- Five Vignettes for five trombones (publ. Bardic)
- God, Ruler of All Nations (Beiseel, arranged for SSAATTB saxophones (publ. Dorn)
- Quartet for 4 guitars (publ. Acoma)
- Sinfonia No. 8 for Tuned Percussion (Timpani and Mallets) (publ. AM Percussion)
- Sonata Elegiaca for alto saxophone and piano (publ. Presser)
- Sonatina Giocosa for Bass Saxophone and piano (publ. Presser)
- Three American Folk Hymns for 2 (alike) saxophones (publ. Dorn)
- Three "Sacred Harp" Songs for SAATTBBass saxophones (publ. Dorn)
- Trio for Reeds and Piano for soprano saxophone (or oboe), Tenor Saxophone (or Heckelphone) and piano (publ. Dorn)
- William Billings Suite for SAATBBass saxophones (publ. Dorn)

1988

- Caprice for Bassoon and band (publ. Kalmus/Masters)
- Chamber Concerto for baritone Saxophone and Wind Octet (publ. Dorn)
- Overture, Interlude and Scherzo for SSAAATTBBass saxophones (publ. Dorn)

1989

- Chautauqua Overture for band (publ. Wingert-Jones)
- Concerto No. 2 for Alto Saxophone and [chamber] orchestra (or piano) (publ. Dorn)
- Fantasia for Tuba and [chamber] orchestra (or piano) (publ. Wingert-Jones)
- Grainger Tit-Bits (orchestration of Grainger's Room Tit-Bits for band) (publ. Bardic)
- Suite of Old American Hymns for SAAATBBass saxophones (publ. Dorn)

1990

- Dance for Two (alike) Saxophones (publ. Ethos)

1991

- Concerto No. 2 for Piano and band (publ. Wingert-Jones)
- Quartet for 2 trumpets and 2 trombones (or horn sub for a trombone) (publ. Ensemble)
- Serenade for saxophones (SAATBBass) (publ. Ethos)
- Sinfonia No. 9 for band (publ. Wingert-Jones)
- Trio Estatico for alto and tenor saxophones and piano (publ. Ethos)

1992

- Bagatelles (5 pieces) for orchestra (publ. Wingert-Jones)
- Essay for Band: Triads and Trichords for band (manuscript)
- Hallelujah Fantasy for band (publ. Wingert-Jones)
- Quartet Concerto for 4 Saxophones (SATB) and orchestra (or band) (publ. Kalmus/Masters)
- Seven "Sacred Harp" Songs for alto saxophone and keyboard (publ. Masters)
- Two Sacred Songs for baritone and guitar (publ. Acoma)

1993

- Fantasy on Vermont Tunes for trombone (or horn) and piano (publ. Kalmus/Masters)
- Hymn and Fuguing Tune (orchestration of Jeremiah Ingalls tune for Woodwind Quintet) (publ. Masters)
- Lyric Suite for Viola, Tenor Saxophone and piano (publ. To the Fore)
- Lyric Symphony (No. 4) for band (publ. Wingert-Jones)
- Morning Trumpet for trumpet and organ (or piano) (publ. Wingert-Jones)
- Quartet for Oboe, Alto Saxophone, Horn and Bassoon (publ. Dorn)
- Sextet for Euphonium and Woodwind Quintet (publ. Tuba Press
- Sonata No. 2 for tuba and piano (publ. Kalus/Masters)

1994

- Adagio for Organ (publ. Zimbel) [from Adagio for Saxophones]
- Adagio for Saxophones (SAAATTBBass) (publ. Dorn)
- African Dance for Alto Saxophone and piano (publ. Dorn)
- Concertino for SATB Saxophones and piano (publ. Dorn)
- Concertino da Camera for soprano saxophone and brass quintet (publ. Kalmus/Masters)
- Double Quartet for SATB saxophones and trumpet, horn, trombone an tuba (publ. Kalmus/Masters)
- Easter Anthem (orchestration arrangement of William Billings tune for band) (publ. Kalmus/Masters)
- Sinfonia No. 10 for 4 euphoniums and 4 tubas (publ. Tuba Press)
- Sonata for Soprano Saxophone (or oboe) and Piano (publ. Dorn)
- Sonatina Romantica for clarinet and Piano (publ. Ethos)
- Southern Harmonies for ATB Saxophones (publ. Dorn)
- Three Inventions for trumpet and tuba (publ. Nichols)

1995

- Concerto Breve for Bass Trombone and orchestra (or piano) (publ. Kalmus/Masters)
- Centennial Symphony (No. 5) for band (publ. Masters Music)
- Sacred Harp Suite for S/A ATB saxophones (publ. Dorn)
- Suite for 2 pianos (manuscript) [orchestrated in 1999]
- Triple Quartet for 4 trombones, 4 euphoniums and 4 tubas (publ. Kalmus/Masters)

1996

- Intrada for 8 euphoniums (publ. Tuba) [published with Gigue]
- Nonet for Flutes (2 piccolos, 5 flutes, alto and bass flutes) (publ. Masters)
- Presidential Portraits (arrangement of music by Walter Watson for band) (publ. Black Squirrel)
- Quartet for 4 alto saxophones (publ. Dorn)
- Quartettino for AATB saxophones (publ. Ethos)
- Romance for bass saxophone and piano (publ. Ethos)
- Rose of Sharon (orchestration arrangement of William Billings tune for band) (publ. Black Squirrel)
- Sinfonia no. 11 for orchestra (manuscript)
- Sonorities Viii for bass saxophone and piano (publ. Ethos)

1997

- Duo Sonata for soprano and baritone saxophones
- Gigue for 8 euphoniums (publ. Tuba) [published with Intrada]
- Moods of the Pacific for soprano, oboe, bassoon and piano (manuscript)
- Music for 12 Saxophones (SSAAAATTTBBBass) (publ. Ethos)
- Nonet for Bassoons (8 Bassoons and Contrabassoon)
- Prelude and Fanfare for AAATTB saxophones (publ. Dorn) [from 1965 organ piece of the same name]
- Quintet No. 3 for brass quintet (publ. Ensemble)
- Shape-Note Songs for euphonium-tuba ensemble (publ. Stephen Shopp Music Publications
- Shape Note Tunes for Seven Bassoons (incl Contrabassoon) (Manuscript)
- Sonorities IX for clarinet and piano(publ. Ethos)

1998

- Andante and Scherzo for 4 Bassoons (publ. Masters)
- Birds in Space for Clarinet Quartet (Eb, 2 Bb and Bass) and Wind Ensemble (publ. Masters)
- Festive Ode to Yerevan for alto saxophone and piano (publ. Dorn)
- Memorial Music for 2 trombones (publ. Ensemble)
- Nocturne for Bass Clarinet and piano (publ. Prairie Dawg Press)
- Quartet for Clarinets for 3 Bb and Bass Clarinets (publ. Masters)
- Reeds at Play for 3 oboes and English Horn (publ. Prairie Dawg Press)
- Sinfonia No. 12 for Woodwind Choir (publ. Masters)
- Six Southern Folk Hymns for SAT Saxophones (publ. Masters)
- Variants of a Southern Song for SAT saxophones (publ. Masters)

1999

- Ancestors of Minimalism for AATB saxophones (publ. Dorn)
- Angel Band Suite for band (publ. Southern)
- Invention for 2 English Horns (or Alto Saxophones) and Tuba (or Bass Saxophone) (publ. Bocal)
- Old American Hymn Duet for English Horn (or Alto Saxophone) and Tuba (or Bass Saxophone) (publ. Bocal)
- Prelude, Cadenza and Rondo for cello and piano
- Shape Note Tunes for Four Bassoons (publ. Masters)
- Suite for Orchestra [based on 1995 Suite for 2 pianos] (manuscript)
- Thanksgiving Anthem (orchestration arrangement of Williams Billings Tune for band (publ. Southern)
- Trio Concertino for 3 Saxophones (ATB) and band (or piano) (publ. Southern)
- Two Studies for band (publ. Southern)

2000

- Concertino No. 2 for Tuba (or Bass Saxophone) and Wind Ensemble (or piano) (publ. Wingert-Jones)
- Millennial Quartet for SATB saxophones (publ. Ethos)
- Pastorale and Tarantella for soprano and alto saxophones and piano (publ. Ethos)
- Sinfonia No. 13 for string orchestra (manuscript)
- Sinfonia No. 14 for wind ensemble (manuscript)
- Soliloquy and Scherzo for Sopranino Saxophone or E♭ Clarinet (publ. Ethos)

2001

- All Hail the Power for band (manuscript)
- Andante for Saxophone Quintet (SATBBass) (publ. Dorn) [arrangement of Contra-Piece]
- Celebration for 12 trombones (publ. Ensemble)
- Contra-Piece for Contrabass Saxophone, Contrabass Clarinet or Contrabassoon and Piano (publ. Prairie Dawg Press)
- Dances for 3 (alike) saxophones (publ. Dorn)
- Duo 2001 for 2 Alto Saxophones and Wind Ensemble (publ. Wingert-Jones) [orchestration of piano part from Trio 2001]
- Elegy 2001 for English Horn (or Alto Saxophone) and Piano (publ. Presser)
- Reverie and Canonic Scherzo for violin, tenor saxophone and piano (publ. To the Fore)
- Sacred Harmonies for strings (publ. Southern)
- Sonatina for Bassoon and Piano (publ. Prairie Dawg Press)
- Trio 2001 for 2 Alto Saxophones and Piano (publ. Wingert-Jones)

2002

- Concerto Grosso for Wind Quintet and band (publ. Wingert-Jones)
- Duet for 2 Bass (or baritone) saxophones (publ. Presser)
- Present Joys for orchestra (publ. Ludwig/Masters)
- Sinfonia No. 15 for saxophones (SSSAAATTBBTTBBBass) (publ. Ethos)
- Sonatina for Alto saxophone and piano (publ. Ethos)
- Terzetto: Four Pieces for Three Players for Violin, Tenor Saxophone and Piano (publ. To the Fore) [incorporating Reverie and Canonic Scherzo]

2003

- Carol for soprano saxophone (or flute) and piano (publ. Dorn) [revision of a movement of the 1960 Suite for Flute and Piano]
- Fantasy Pieces for cello, alto saxophone and piano (publ. To the Fore)
- "Heavenly Union" for soprano saxophone, Flute and harp (or keyboard) (publ. Presser)
- "My Shepherd's Sacred Throne" for alto saxophone and organ (publ. Presser)
- Octet for 8 trombones (publ. Prairie Dawg Press
- Outdoor Music for SATB saxophones (publ. Presser)
- Quartet for Low Brass and Piano (trombone, euphonium, tuba and piano) (publ. Tuba-Euphonium Press)
- Sonata No. 3 for tuba and piano (publ. Presser)
- Suite No. 2 for SATB saxophones (publ. Presser)
- Trio-Miniature for Alto and Baritone Saxophones and piano (publ. Presser)

2004

- Fantasy on Celtic Hymn Tunes for band (manuscript)
- Quartet for soprano saxophone, violin, viola and cello (manuscript)
- Trio Sonata for cello, alto saxophone and piano (publ. Ethos)

2005

- Chamber Suite for Eleven Players (2 Violins, Viola, Cello, Bass, Flute, Clarinet, Bass Clarinet, Horn, Trumpet and harp (manuscript)
- Epitaph for Clarinet and piano (manuscript)
- Epitaph for cello and piano (publ. Prairie Dawg Press
- "Jordan's Banks" for SAATBBass saxophones (publ. Dorn)
- Nonet for Winds and Brass for flute, oboe, Clarinet, Bassoon, Alto Saxophone, Trumpet, Horn, Trombone and Tuba (publ. Prairie Dawg Press)
- Pentatonics for ATB Saxophones (publ. Dorn)
- Quintet for Clarinet and Strings (manuscript)
- Reminiscence for any solo saxophone (manuscript)
- Sinfonia Caroliniana for band (manuscript)

2006

- Concert Music for saxophones (SopraninoSSAAATTBBBass) and piano (publ. Dorn)
- Dance for 2 Tenor saxophones and piano (manuscript)
- Duo for tenor saxophone and piano (publ. Ethos)
- Prelude and Dance for 2 soprano saxophones and piano (publ. Ethos)
- Trio-Sonatina for soprano and baritone saxophones and piano (manuscript)

2007

- Sinfonia Concertante "Trio Bel Canto" for alto and tenor saxophones, piano, percussion and wind octet (publ. Dorn) [also unpublished version for SAATBBass saxophones, percussion and piano]
- Suite No. 3 for SATB saxophones (manuscript)
- Trio for Bb Saxophones (STBass) (Publ. Dorn)

2008

- Caprice for clarinet and piano (manuscript)
- Declamation for bass saxophone and piano (Manuscript)
- Duetto Amabile for oboe and bassoon (publ. Prairie Dawg Press)
- Duo for baritone saxophone and piano (publ. Dorn)
- Duo Concertante for 2 Alto Saxophones and band (Manuscript)
- Music for Three for cello, Flute and Alto Saxophone (manuscript)
- Song and Dance for 2 Tenors and piano (publ. Dorn) [incorporating 2006 Dance for tenor saxes and piano]

2009

- "Grenadiers' Galop" for saxophones (SAATTBBass) (publ. Dorn)
- Prelude: Fount of Blessing for organ (publ. Zimbel)
- Quintet for Lower Saxophones (TTBBass)and Piano (publ. Dorn)
- Sextet for Clarinets (Eb, 3 Bb, Alto and Bass Clarinets) (manuscript)

2010

- "Amazing Grace and Wondrous Love" for soprano (or alto) saxophone and piano OR for sax ensemble alone (SSAATB) (Hymn arrangements publ. Dorn)
- Concertino No. 2 for SATB saxophones and piano (publ. Dorn)
- Polka-dotted Scherzo for SAT saxophones (publ. Dorn)
- Polskamerican for saxophones (SSAAAATTBB/Bass) (publ. Dorn
- Suite for Band: Wood-Notes Wild for band (manuscript)

2011

- The Mark of Cain and the Love of Christ for medium voice and piano (manuscript)
