= James Matheson (composer) =

American composer (born 1970)

James Matheson (born 1970 in Des Moines, Iowa) is an American composer. His works have been commissioned and performed by the Albany Symphony Orchestra, Chicago Symphony Orchestra, Los Angeles Philharmonic, New York Philharmonic, Borromeo String Quartet, Carnegie Hall and the St. Lawrence String Quartet. In December 2011, he received the Charles Ives Living from the American Academy of Arts and Letters, an award providing him with $100,000 for two years (2012-2014). Previously, he received the Academy’s Goddard Lieberson Fellowship in 2008 and Hinrichsen Award in 2002. He has also received awards from the Civitella Ranieri, Bogliasco and Sage Foundations, ASCAP, and the Robbins Prize. He was executive director of the MATA Festival of New Music in New York from 2005-2007 and has been a fellow at the Aspen Music Festival. Since September 2009, he has been the director of the Los Angeles Philharmonic’s Composer Fellowship Program.

== Works by James Matheson ==
Unchained (2017) for orchestra without strings Commissioned by the Los Angeles Philharmonic, Gustavo Dudamel, Music Director. The premiere performances took place February 24, 25, and 26th with the Los Angeles Philharmonic, James Gaffigan, cond.

Violin Concerto (2011) for violin and large orchestra 25’ Co-Commissioned by the Chicago Symphony Orchestra and the Los Angeles Philharmonic Premiere performances by the Chicago Symphony Orchestra (Baird Dodge, violin; Esa-Pekka Salonen, cond.), December 15, 16 and 17th, 2011 and the Los Angeles Philharmonic (Martin Chalifour, violin; Pablo Heras-Casado, cond.), March 2, 3 and 4th, 2012

Four Fanfares (2011) for large orchestra 2' Commissioned by the Los Angeles Philharmonic, Gustavo Dudamel, Music Director Premiere performances by the Los Angeles Philharmonic, April 23 and 30, 2011, David Afkham, cond.

True South (2010) for small orchestra 16' Commissioned by the New York Philharmonic, Alan Gilbert, Music Director Premiere performances by the New York Philharmonic, December 17 and 18, 2010, Alan Gilbert, cond.

Borromean Rings (2010) for piano, 2 violins, viola and cello 20' Commissioned by the Cheswatyr Foundation, premiered August 29, 2010 at Maverick Concerts, with the Borromeo String Quartet and Judith Gordon, piano

Fault Lines (2009) for piano, violin, viola and cello 10' Commissioned by Mayfest, premiered May 21, 2010

Sharp Objects (2008) for string orchestra without basses 5' Commissioned for by Phillips Academy for the Corelli Ensemble Premiered February 29, 2007

The Anatomy of Melancholy (2008) for Bb clarinet, violin, 'cello and piano 16' Commissioned by Antares, premiered February 8, 2008 at the Ravinia Festival

Quartet for Oboe and Strings (2008) for oboe, violin, viola and cello 11' Commissioned by Winsor Music, premiered September 20, 2008

Cradle Songs (2008) for SATB Chorus 10' Commissioned by Phillips Academy (Andover) for Fidelio Settings of two poems by William Blake titled "A Cradle Song"

Violin Sonata (2007) for violin and piano 16' Commissioned by Brooklyn Friends of Chamber Music

On Spaces (2007) for piano six hands 4' Commissioned by Phillips Academy (Andover) for the dedication of the school's new Steinway D grand piano

Contact (2005) for alto saxophone and piano 14’ Commissioned by a consortium of nineteen saxophone/piano duos

La Seine (2007) for English horn (also arr. for Alto Saxophone) 4' Commissioned by the Albany Symphony Orchestra

Songs of Desire, Love and Loss (2004) for soprano and mixed chamber ensemble 20’ A setting of seven poems by Pulitzer Prize-winning poet Alan Dugan Commissioned by Carnegie Hall, Premiered October 10, 2004

Umbras and Illuminations (2004) for orchestra 20’ Commissioned by the Albany Symphony Orchestra Premiered by ASO April 23, 2004, David Alan Miller, cond.

Colonnade (2003) for chamber orchestra 18’ Commissioned by the Albany Symphony Orchestra Premiered by ASO, David Alan Miller, cond.

The Paces (2003) for piano and chamber orchestra 20’ Commissioned by the Stott Fund Premiered by Charles Abramovic and Orchestra 2001, Kimmel Center, PA

River, River, River (2001) for orchestra 10’ Commissioned by the Chicago Symphony Orchestra Premiered by Civic Orchestra of Chicago, Orchestra Hall, Chicago

Burn (2001) for Wind Ensemble 9’ Commissioned by the Cornell University Wind Ensemble

Buzz (2001) for clarinet, violin, cello, and piano 7’ Premiered by Ensemble X Recorded by Antares on Innova

Falling (2000) for piano trio 13’ Premiered by the Chicago Symphony Orchestra (chamber series) Published by C.F. Peters Corporation

Gliss (1999) for orchestra 12’ Premiered August 1999 by the Festival Orchestra of the Hartwick College Summer Music Festival and Institute chamber orchestra

Pound (1999) for piano solo 11’ Premiered by Xak Bjerken at Cornell University Recorded by Mr. Bjerken on High Rise (CRI)

Spin (1998) for string quartet 13’ May 16, 1999, Chicago Symphony Orchestra (chamber series)

Sleep (1997) concerto for violin and chamber orchestra 25’ Premiered March 1997 by Baird Dodge, violin and Festival Orchestra, Cornell University, Mark Scatterday, cond.

Nonet (1990) for mixed ensemble 9’ Premiered by Orchestra 2001, Philadelphia, PA
