= Jules Demersseman =

French musician

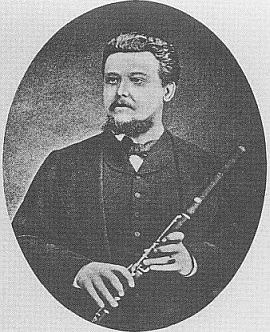
Jules Demersseman

Jules Auguste Demersseman (9 January 1833 – 1 December 1866) was a French flautist and composer.

== Biography ==
Demersseman was born in Hondschoote, Département Nord, France, near the Belgian border. At 11, he was a student of Jean-Louis Tulou at the Conservatoire de Paris. He won the first prize there at the age of twelve and quickly became famous as a virtuoso. However, he was not considered for a professorship, since he, influenced by his teacher, did not favor the modern type of transverse flute designed by Theobald Böhm which had been introduced into France in the meantime. Demersseman was only 33 when he died in Paris, presumably from tuberculosis.

== Works ==
Demersseman wrote numerous works for his own instrument, the flute. Probably the best known of his works today is the Solo de Concert, Op. 82 No. 6. This piece, also known as the "Italian Concerto", uses a Neapolitan folk melody in the middle movement and closes with a saltarello. In addition to his works for flute, Demersseman was one of the first French composers to write music for the newly developed saxophone. He wrote a Fantasy for the saxophone and piano. For the saxophone, he also wrote a piece called 'The carnival of Venice'.

== Media ==
Introduction and Polonaise

== Sources and further information ==
=== Literature ===
- Pešek, U., Pešek, Ž.: Flötenmusik aus drei Jahrhunderten. Bärenreiter 1990. ISBN 3-7618-0985-9
- Goldberg, A.: Porträts und Biographien hervorragender Flöten-Virtuosen, -Dilettanten und -Komponisten. Moeck 1987 (Reprint of 1906). ISBN 3-87549-028-2

=== External links ===
- Literature by and about Jules Demersseman in the German National Library catalogue
- Free scores by Jules Demersseman at the International Music Score Library Project (IMSLP)
