= Satoshi Yagisawa =

Japanese composer

Satoshi Yagisawa (八木澤 教司, Yagisawa Satoshi; born 3 April 1975 in Tokyo, Japan) is a Japanese composer.

He graduated from the Musashino Academy of Music. He also finished a master's courses and graduated with the master of music. He then worked for two years in music research.

His work is varied and includes orchestral music, chamber music, choral music and music for traditional Japanese instruments. His compositions for winds, whose titles are self-descriptive, are kept in a dramatic musical language. Furthermore, he acts as a judge in competitions, as guest conductor with many orchestras and as the author of articles in professional journals ("The Flute", "The Clarinet", "The Sax"). He arranged in 2003 the theme of music (Music for planting and sowing by the Emperor and Empress of Japan) for the 54th National Arbor Day in Chiba Prefecture.

== Works ==
=== Works for wind ===
- 1995 Celebres Overture
- 1996 Dimelentas
- 2000 Dimelentas II
- 2001 March-Bou-Shu
- 2001 The Lyric for Wind Orchestra "Appeals of autumnel winds"
- 2002 Prelude
- 2002 "Soaring over the Ridges" – the Impression of the North Alps
- 2003 Flamboyant – Red Flames on the ground
- 2003 A Tone poem for Wind Orchestra "And then the Ocean Glows"
- 2003 Lemuria – The Lost Continent
  1. The Paradise of Greenery "Lemuria"
  2. Praising the Universe – The Fortress in the Drizzle
  3. The Civilization Going Down – The Peace to be handed down
- 2003 Per-Sonare
- 2004 Moai – the Seven Giant Statues Gazing at the Sun
- 2004 The Scene of the Homeland – on theme by Edvard Grieg
- 2004 Machu Picchu: City in the Sky - The mystery of the hidden Sun Temple
- 2003/2004 The West Symphony
  1. The Blue Wolf on the Plateau
  2. Wahlstatt
- 2005 Nazca Lines – The Universe Drawn on the Earth
- 2005 Hymn to the Sun — with the Beat of the Mother Earth
- 2005 Cavetowns "Cappadocia" – Strangely shaped rocks where elves dwell
- 2005 Las Bolas Grandes
- Fanfare "Music City"
- 2006 Sinfonia
- 2008 On the Earth, Under the Sky
- 2008 To Be Vivid Stars
- 2009 The Bells of Sagrada Familia - the everlasting Will of Antoni Gaudi
- 2009 Symphonic Episode I
- 2010 Voyage – Flight into a Hopeful Future
- 2010 Like The Eagle, We Soar and Rise
- 2011 Pompeii – The Ruins Know the Long and Magnificent History
- 2011 Fanfare Hayabusa
- 2018 Fanfare Exuberante
- 2019 "Four Seasons of Japan"
- 2020 "Quarantine"
- 2020 "Aurora Dances"
- 2020 "Eternal Friendship"

=== Choir music ===
- The Nightview of Lonesome

=== Chamber music ===
- 2001 Intrada for brass octet (Trumpet 1, Trumpet 2, trumpet 3, Horn, Trombone 1(opt: Euphonium), Trombone 2, Trombone 3, Tuba)
- 2002 Capriccio for Clarinet Octet (E♭ Clarinet, 4 B♭ Clarinet, Alto Clarinet, Bass Clarinet, Contrabass Clarinet)
- 2003 Rhapsody for Euphonium Tuba Quartet (Euphonium 1, Euphonium 2, Tuba 1, Tuba 2)
- 2004 Fioritura for Flute Quartet
- 2005 Esmeralda for Euphonium Tuba Quartet (Euphonium 1, Euphonium 2, Tuba 1, Tuba 2)
- 2006 Coloratura for Flute Quartet
- 2009 Amazones for Euphonium Tuba Quartet (Euphonium 1, Euphonium 2, Tuba 1, Tuba 2)
- 2011 Ramen Noodles for Euphonium Tuba Quartet (Euphonium 1, Euphonium 2, Tuba 1, Tuba 2)
- Arion's Harp for Saxophone Quartet (commissioned by the Arion Saxophone Quartet)
