= Otis Murphy =

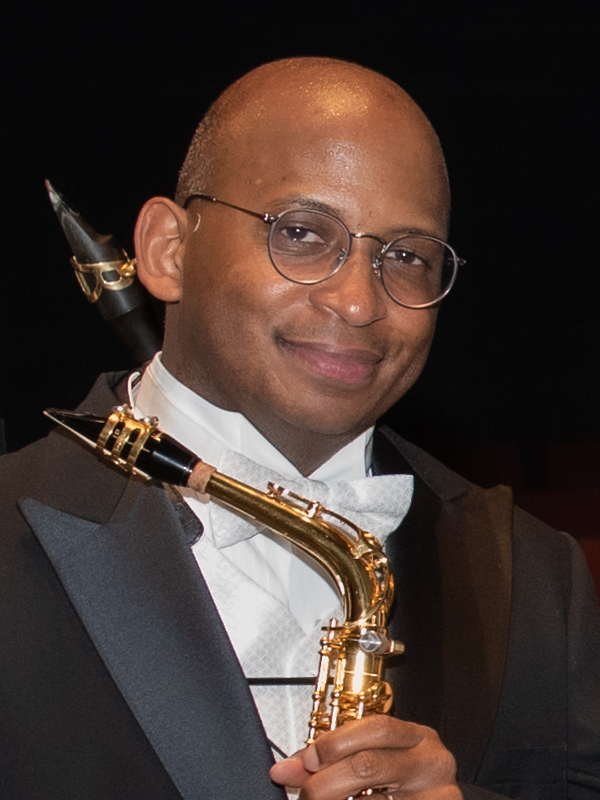
- Murphy in 2020

Background information
- Born: 1972 (age 52–53); United States
- Genres: classical
- Occupation: Saxophonist
- Instrument: Alto saxophone

Otis Murphy (born 1972) is an American classical saxophonist and saxophone professor at Indiana University's Jacobs School of Music. He joined in 2001 and became one of the youngest members of its faculty in the school's history.

== Biography ==
Murphy has primarily studied with esteemed saxophonists Eugene Rousseau and Jean-Yves Fourmeau. Murphy has won numerous awards and prizes which include 2nd Prize in the Adolphe Sax International Saxophone Competition (1998) in Belgium, 3rd Prize in the Jean-Marie Londeix International Saxophone Competition (1996) in France, 1st Prize in the Heida Hermanns Young Artist Competition, 2nd Prize in the St. Louis Symphony Young Artist Competition, and the J. William Fulbright grant that allowed saxophone study in France.

He is an active saxophone soloist and clinician who is in great demand throughout the world. In addition to his frequent solo appearances throughout the United States, he has also performed and given saxophone classes in France, Switzerland, Germany, the United Kingdom, Canada, Japan, Belgium, and Italy. Dr. Murphy is a Yamaha performing artist and a D'Addario performing artist.

== Discography ==
- "Memories of Dinant," Otis Murphy and Haruko Murphy
- "Fantasy," Otis Murphy and Haruko Murphy
- "Song," Otis Murphy and the Indiana University Wind Ensemble
