= Saxophone quartet =

Musical ensemble with four saxophones

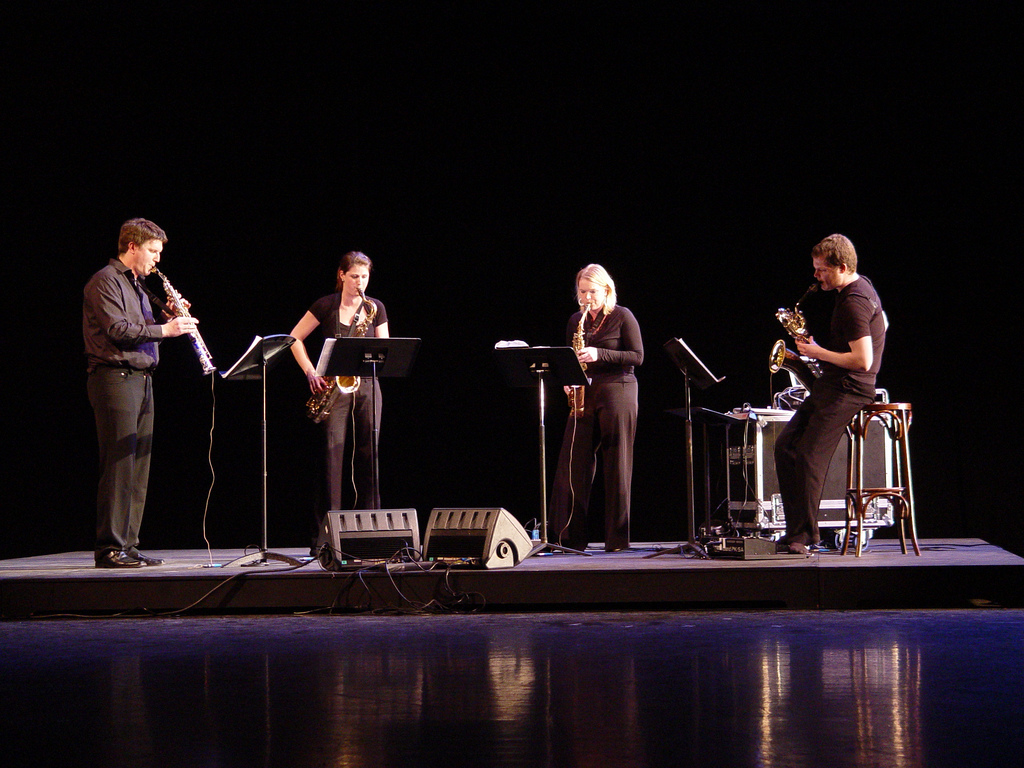
Python Saxophone Quartet in 2008 with standard SATB configuration

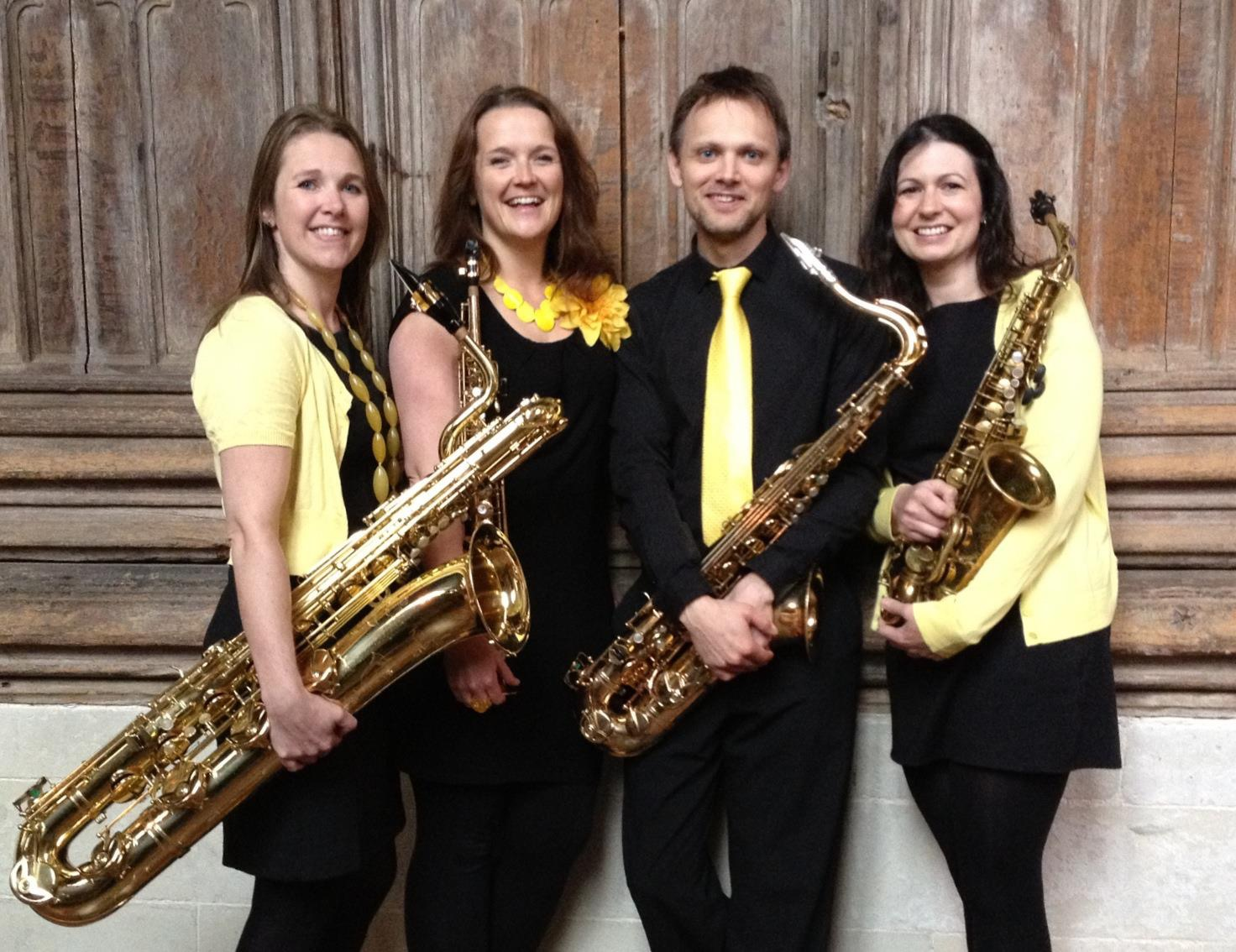
The Spiral Saxophone Quartet in 2013 with SATB saxophones.

A saxophone quartet is a musical ensemble composed of four saxophones, typically soprano, alto, tenor and baritone saxophones. Different saxophone family members are employed to provide a larger range and a variety of tone colours. Other arrangements of instruments also exist, but are rarer. A piece of music composed for such an ensemble can also itself be referred to as a saxophone quartet.

== History ==
The saxophone was developed in 1840 by Adolphe Sax, a Belgian instrument maker, flautist, and clarinetist based in Brussels. Sax went to considerable effort to popularize the instrument but faced opposition in his efforts from his fellow instrument makers at the time. Despite being initially conceived of as an orchestral instrument, it was through the avenue of military music that the instrument first gained significant momentum. Composer Jean-Baptiste Singelee had written works for four saxophones in the 19th century. These included Allegro de concert (AATB), Quatuor en 4 Parties (SATB), and Grand Quatuor Concertant en 3 Parties (SATB). In 1878, the Gilmour Band featured a quartet of saxophones which included Edouard Lefèbre, a soloist in the band. Lefèbre went on to form his own saxophone quartet in 1905 with a repertoire of transcriptions.

The main impetus for the recognition of this ensemble was by Marcel Mule, who was the second Professor of saxophone at the Paris Conservatoire after Adolphe Sax himself. In 1928, he founded Le Quatuor de la Musique de la Garde Républicaine, later known as Le Quatuor de saxophones de Paris, and then the Marcel Mule Quartet. The founding members were:

- Marcel Mule on soprano
- René Chaligné on alto
- Hippolyte Poimboeuf on tenor
- Georges Chauvet on baritone

Subsequent members included:

- Paul Romby
- Fernande L’homme
- Georges Charron
- Marcel Josse
- André Bauchy
- Georges Gourdet
- Guy Lacour

Many works for saxophone quartet that are now considered part of the standard repertoire were written for this ensemble. Mule himself also arranged works for this group.

Daniel Deffayet was a student of Marcel Mule, and later professor of saxophone at the Paris Conservatoire. In 1953 he founded the ‘’Quatuor de Saxophones Daniel Deffayet’’ with other members Jacques Maffei, Jacques Terry and Jean Ledieu. Sigurd Rascher, his daughter Carina Rascher, Bruce Weinberger and Linda Bangs formed the Rascher Saxophone Quartet in 1969 which continues to this day. Jean-Yves Fourmeau formed his own quartet in 1979. These ensembles contributed significantly to expanding the repertoire through their work with composers. Notable composers who have written quartets include Phil Woods, Alexander Glazunov, Eugene Bozza, Philip Glass, Juan María Solare, and others. Since the 1970s jazz quartets have started to emerge as well, broadening the scope of the ensemble and the idiom of the repertoire.

== Current forms ==
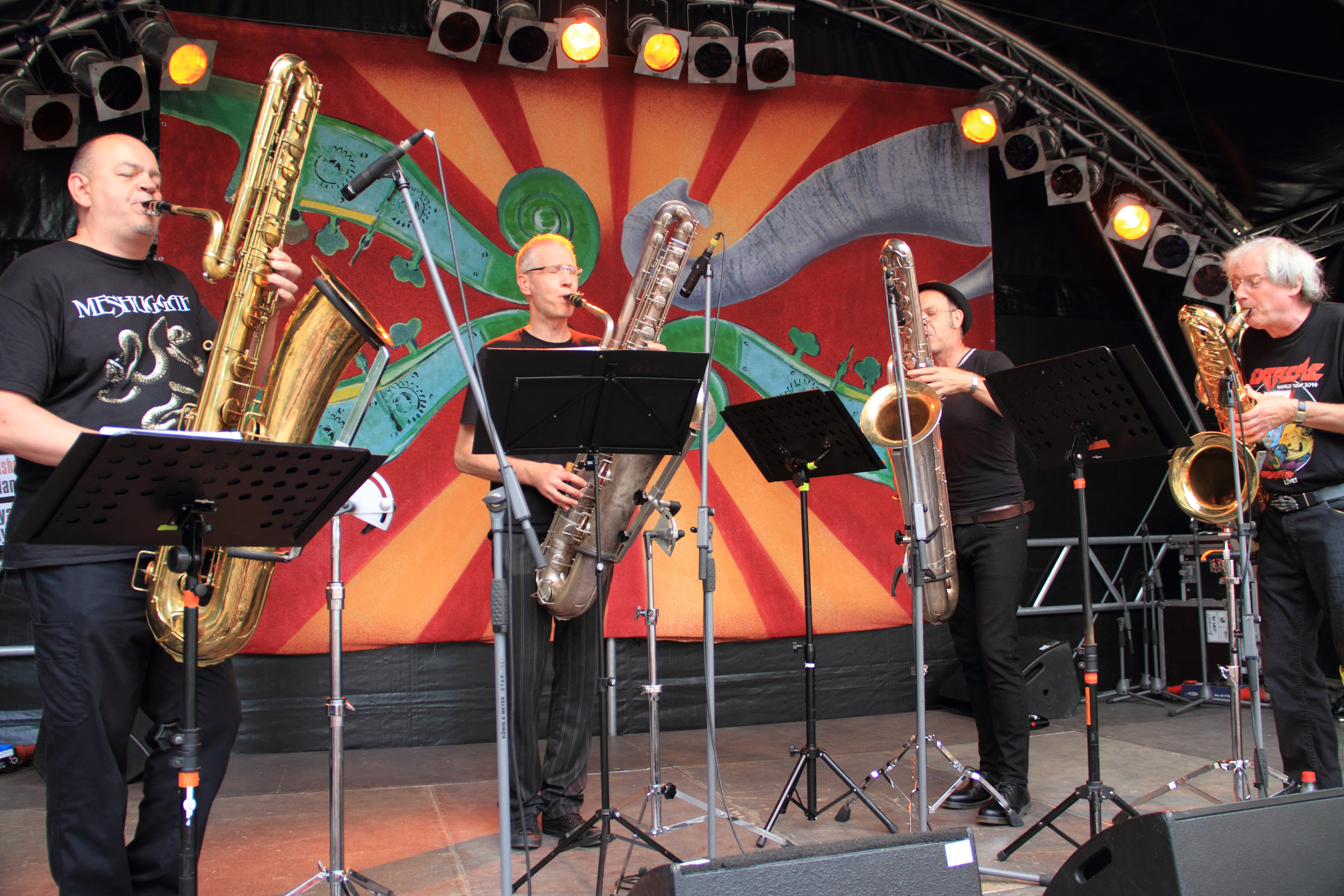
The Deep Schrott bass-saxophone quartet

Saxophone quartets abound as amateur and professional ensembles as well as university-affiliated groups. The most recent World Saxophone Congress, in 2015, hosted a competition specifically for saxophone quartets with a first prize of 4000 euros and a recital, won by Keuris Saxophone Quartet. Saxophone quartets also compete in, and have won, the Fischoff National Chamber Music Competition, which is the world's largest classical chamber music competition.

While SATB remains the most common classical configuration, occasionally the soprano is replaced by another alto leading to an AATB configuration particularly in jazz and contemporary ensembles. Other configurations do exist, notably the Four Baritones Quartet (BBBB) and Deep Schrott (BassBassBassBass) but are much rarer.

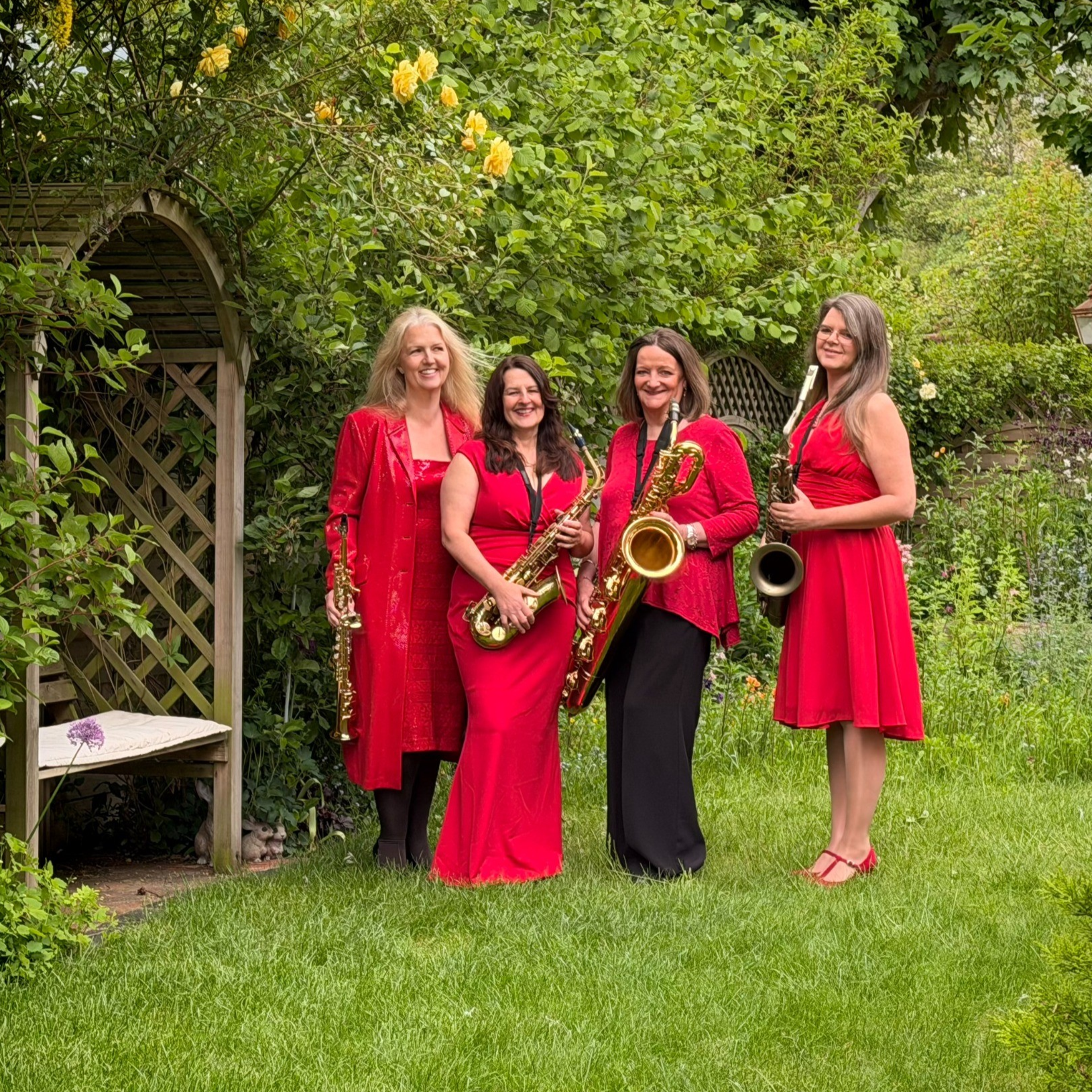
A contemporary saxophone quartet comprising soprano, alto, tenor and baritone saxophones.

== Notable quartets ==
- 29th Street Saxophone Quartet
- PRISM Quartet
- Raschèr Saxophone Quartet
- Sinta Quartet
- Rova Saxophone Quartet
- World Saxophone Quartet

== See also ==
- Quartet
