= Saxophone Concerto (Glazunov) =

Musical composition by Alexander Glazunov

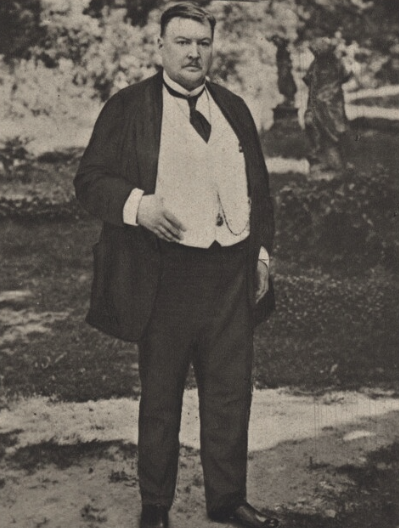
Alexander Glazunov in 1928

The Concerto in E♭ major for alto saxophone and string orchestra, Op. 109, was written by Alexander Glazunov in 1934. The piece lasts about fourteen minutes and is played without pause. It is deeply rooted in Romanticism, and has entered the standard saxophone repertoire.

== History ==
Although invented in the early 1840s, the saxophone was still fairly new and unfamiliar in Glazunov's day; it remained untouched for a long time as it was considered "middle class". However, Glazunov was enthralled by the sound of the saxophone: a new timbre in the musical world.

The work premiered in Nyköping, Sweden, on 25 November 1934, with Sigurd Raschèr, a famous German saxophonist, as soloist. It is Raschèr who is credited for bringing about the concerto's composition. He hounded Glazunov for a saxophone concerto, so much so that the composer wrote to a colleague that he had started the piece in March "under the influences of attacks rather than requests from the Danish (sic) saxophonist named Sigurd Rascher". He completed the work in June 1934. According to French saxophonist Marcel Mule, Glazunov had a reading of the piece with him prior to its publication, the composer playing the piano part.

Glazunov almost certainly never heard his Saxophone Concerto publicly performed, as the first Paris performance of the work did not occur until after his death. He made no mention in his letters of any collaboration with another composer on the concerto. However, in 1936, the publishing company made an addition to the piano reduction: they added A. Petiot as a second composer, probably for copyright purpose as it was common for Soviet Union artists.

== Structure ==
This is the structural breakdown according to Glazunov himself, taken from a letter he wrote to Maximilian Steinberg:

- Exposition: Allegro Moderato, in 4/4, ending in G minor
- Development (brief)
- Transition: Andante (C flat major; sometimes B major), in 3/4, leading into a small cadenza
- Conclusion: Fugato (C minor), in 12/8

Above forms occur again before leading to the coda (E♭ major).

== Analysis ==
The concerto consists of a single movement that opens with the strings playing the main theme. The melody is then played by the soloist. The strings provide a lush background texture. Several musical themes follow. The saxophone begins to dominate with passages of scales and interval jumps. The opening part is in G minor while the central section is in Cb major.

The saxophone then intertwines the melody with lyrical themes of the strings. This interaction results in tonal color. This part features tempo shifts. The saxophone then plays a cadenza that leads to the Fugato part.

Syncopated rhythms are introduced in the orchestra. The saxophone soloist plays the melody which are taken up by the strings. The tempo slows down as high notes are featured. A call and response pattern then emerges as the coda is revealed. The climax occurs with the saxophone playing a note that the strings then finish out.

== Recordings ==
Some well-known saxophonists have made recordings of this piece, including John-Edward Kelly, Arno Bornkamp, Gary Louie Joe Lulloff, Christopher Creviston, Jean-Yves Fourmeau, Lawrence Gwozdz, John Harle, Theodore Kerkezos, Robert Eason, Karel Krautgartner, Jean-Marie Londeix, Marcel Mule, Kenneth Radnofsky, Debra Richtmeyer, and Eugene Rousseau.

== Sources ==
- Ossovsky, Alexander, Aleksandr Konstantinovich Glazunov: His life and creative work; Sanct-Petersburg, Alexander Siloti Concerts Publishing House, 1907.
- Figes, Orlando, Natasha's Dance: A Cultural History of Russia (New York: Metropolitan Books, 2002). ISBN 978-0-8050-5783-6 (hc.).
- Volkov, Solomon, tr. Bouis, Antonina W., Saint Petersburg: A Cultural History (New York: Harper & Row, 1979). ISBN 978-0-06-014476-0.
