= John-Edward Kelly =

American conductor and saxophonist

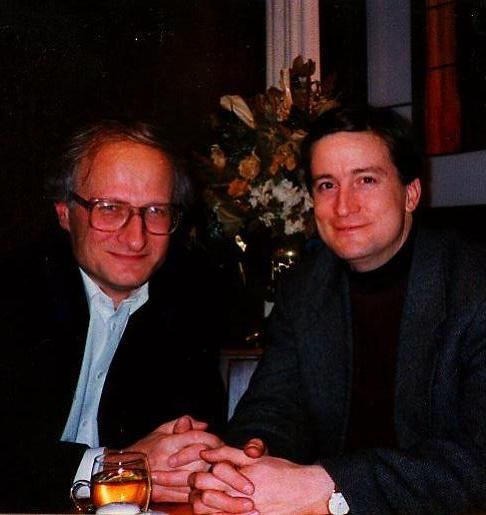
- J. E. Kelly (r.) with K. Meyer after the first performance of his concerto, January 1994
- Born: October 7, 1958; Fairfield, California, US
- Died: February 12, 2015 (aged 56); Vero Beach, Florida
- Occupations: Saxophonist; Conductor
- Years active: 1981–2015
- Organizations: Arcos Orchestra; Raschèr Saxophone Quartet; Alloys Ensemble; The Kelly Quartet

John-Edward Kelly (October 7, 1958 – February 12, 2015) was an Irish-American conductor and saxophonist.

== Early life ==
Born in Fairfield, California, Kelly began music studies in Belleville, Illinois studying clarinet, saxophone, flute and voice.

Kelly focused on his passion for the saxophone as he began formal music studies at Florida State University's College of Music. He desired to resurrect the original tone and range of the saxophone as intended by its inventor, Adolphe Sax. His teachers included Sigurd Raschèr. After Florida State, He had a 30-year international career as a classical saxophonist.

== Career ==
- In 1981 Kelly took Sigurd Raschèr's place as alto saxophonist in the Raschèr Saxophone Quartet. He performed regularly with the quartet for ten years.
- In 1994 Kelly founded the Alloys Ensemble (saxophone, cello, piano & percussion).
- From 1996 to 2003 he was a professor of contemporary chamber music at the Robert Schumann Hochschule in Düsseldorf.
- He was elected to the Royal Swedish Academy of Music in 1999.
- From 2000 to 2005 he was professor of saxophone and contemporary chamber music at the Norwegian Academy of Music in Oslo.
- In 2004 he founded the Kelly Quartet.
- In 2005 he co-founded (with violinist Elissa Cassini) the Arcos Orchestra, an ensemble with a focus on unfamiliar orchestral repertoire.
- In 2005, he performed with the Naumburg Orchestral Concerts, in the Naumburg Bandshell, Central Park, in the summer series.

He lectured and served as a guest professor in such cities as London, The Hague, Hamburg, Düsseldorf, Helsinki, Rochester, Stuttgart, Lyon, and Oslo. He published articles on aesthetics, contemporary music and the saxophone, including a pamphlet titled "The Acoustics of the Saxophone from a Phenomenological Perspective". He also gave a series of lectures titled 'The Art of Listening'.

Kelly gave the first performances of more than 200 works for saxophone, including 30 concertos for saxophone and orchestra. His performing repertoire consisted primarily of works written expressly for him. In 1995 he played the world premiere of Dimitri Terzakis's saxophone concerto, which was broadcast live to 27 nations. Other composers who have written works for Kelly include: Samuel Adler, Kalevi Aho, Osvaldas Balakauskas, Jürg Baur, Erik Bergman, David Blake, John Boda, Thomas Böttger, Herbert Callhoff, Michael Denhoff, Violeta Dinescu, Brian Elias, Anders Eliasson, Werner Wolf Glaser, Sampo Haapamäki, Ingvar Karkoff, Maurice Karkoff, Tristan Keuris, Hans Kox, Nicola LeFanu, Otmar Mácha, Tera de Marez-Oyens, Miklós Maros, Gérard Masson, Roland Leistner-Mayer, Krzysztof Meyer, Gráinne Mulvey, Pehr-Henrik Nordgren, Enrique Raxach, Uros Rojko, Jan Sandström, Sven-David Sandström, Leif Segerstam, Manfred Stahnke, Dimitri Terzakis, Stefan Thomas, Friedrich Voss, and Iannis Xenakis.

== Personal life ==
Kelly met his wife Kristin, a physician, at a concert in Germany. The couple married in 2003. They had 4 children, 3 sons and a daughter. He was a licensed airplane pilot and flight instructor.

== Selected discography ==
- John-Edward Kelly & Bob Versteegh (3 volumes) (1987, 1991, 1994) - Col legno Musikproduktionen AU031805, AU031817, and WWE1CD31885
- Works for Saxophone & Orchestra by Ibert, Larsson, & Martin, BMG (with the Ostrobothnian Chamber Orchestra) (1991) - Arte Nova 74321277
- Miklós Maros Saxophone Concerto (with the Prague Radio Symphony Orchestra) (1990) - Phono Suecia PS-CD-23
- Pehr Henrik Nordgren Saxophone Concerto (with the Ostrobothnian Chamber Orchestra) (1995) - Finlandia 3984233922
- Allan Pettersson Symphony No. 16 (with the Sinfonie-Orchester des Saarländischen Rundfunks) (1995) - CPO 9992842
- Jan Sandström - My Assam Dragon (with the Swedish Radio Symphony Orchestra (1995) - Phono Suecia PSCD87
- John-Edward Kelly Alone (1999) - Emergo Classics EC39322
- Hans Kox - Concertino (with the Norwegian Winds) (1991) - Attaca-Babel 92621
- Hans Kox - Through a Glass, Darkly (1992) - Attaca-Babel 9374
- Viktor Ullmann - Slawische Rhapsodie (with the Deutsches Symphonie-Orchester Berlin) (1998) - Orfeo C419981A
- Tristan Keuris - Laudi (with the Netherlands Radio Philharmonic Orchestra) (1994) - Emergo Classics EC39332
- Dimitri Terzakis - Konflikte (1997) - ProViva 7198585 (ISVP185CD)
- Tristan Keuris - Three Sonnets (2001)
- Anders Eliasson - Symphony No. 3 (2001)
- Anders Eliasson - Desert Point / Ostacoli / Sinfonia Per Achi (with Arcos Orchestra, conductor: John-Edward Kelly) (2008) - NEOS SACD 10813
- Pehr Henrik Nordgren - Phantasme (2001)
- Hans Kox - Face-to-Face (2001)
- The Alloys Ensemble/ (2001)
