= Terzakis =

Terzakis (Greek: Τερζάκης) is a Greek surname. Notable people with the surname include:

- Angelos Terzakis (1907–1979), Greek writer
- Dimitri Terzakis (born 1938), Greek composer
