= Raschèr Saxophone Quartet =

American saxophone ensemble

The Raschèr Saxophone Quartet is a professional ensemble of four saxophonists which performs classical and modern music.

The quartet was founded in the United States in 1969 by prominent classical saxophonist Sigurd Raschèr, his daughter, Carina (Karin) and two former Students (Linda Bangs and Bruce Weinberger). Some years later the quartet relocated to Germany and has been based there ever since.

The Quartet has appeared at major concert halls in Europe and the United States, including Carnegie Hall and Lincoln Center in New York City, the Kennedy Center in Washington, D.C., Opera Bastille Paris, Royal Festival Hall in London, Kölner Philharmonie, Concertgebouw, Schauspielhaus Berlin, Berliner Philharmonie, Musikverein Vienna, Tonhalle Zürich.

The quartet has received strong reviews and was acclaimed as the "Uncrowned Kings of the Saxophone" by the Wiener Zeitung.

== Personnel ==
- Linda Bangs-Urban, baritone saxophone, 1969–1992
- Kenneth Coon, baritone saxophone, 1992–2019
- John-Edward Kelly, alto saxophone, 1981–1990
- Christine Rall, soprano saxophone, 2002–present
- Carina Raschèr, soprano saxophone, 1969–2002
- Sigurd Raschèr, alto saxophone, 1969–1980
- Elliot Riley, alto saxophone, 2001–2024
- Morgan Webster, alto saxophone, 2024–present
- Bruce Weinberger, tenor saxophone, 1969–2014
- Harry Kinross White, alto saxophone, 1990–2001
- Andreas van Zoelen, tenor saxophone, 2014–present
- Oscar Trompenaars, baritone saxophone, 2019–2023; 2024–present
- Iria Garrido Meira, baritone saxophone, 2023–2024

== Original works written for the quartet ==
Sigurd Raschèr's tireless pursuit of classical composers led many of them to compose works dedicated to the quartet. The continued efforts by the group after Sigurd Raschèr's departure, combined with the impressive technical and musical abilities of the quartet, have led over 250 composers to dedicate works to the group.

Composers who have written for the group include:

- Kalevi Aho
- Lera Auerbach
- Erik Bergman
- Luciano Berio
- Günter Bialas
- Michael Denhoff
- Franco Donatoni
- Elena Firsova
- Philip Glass
- Sofia Gubaidulina
- Cristóbal Halffter
- Walter S. Hartley
- Roman Haubenstock-Ramati
- Jouni Kaipainen
- Tristan Keuris
- Ton de Leeuw
- Lior Navok
- Anders Nilsson
- Pehr Henrik Nordgren
- Per Nørgård
- Miklós Maros
- Robin de Raaff
- Enrique Raxach
- Alexander Raskatov
- Jan Sandström
- Sven-David Sandström
- Wolfgang von Schweinitz
- Steven Stucky
- Dimitri Terzakis
- Erich Urbanner
- John Worley
- Charles Wuorinen
- Iannis Xenakis
- Ruth Zechlin

Numerous composers have been fascinated with the combination of the Raschèr {quartet} and orchestra, which has resulted in more than 20 new works for that combination, as well as invitations from many of the world's leading orchestras, including the Gewandhaus (Leipzig), the Staatskapelle Dresden, the Symphony Orchestra of the Bavarian Radio Orchestra, Bergen Philharmonic, American Composer's Orchestra, Orchestre de Paris, Philharmonique Strasbourg, Royal Liverpool Philharmonic, Residentie Orchestra of the Hague, Berlin Sinfonie Orchestra, Vienna Symphony, SWR Baden-Baden, MDR Orchestra Leipzig, Radio-Sinfonie-Orchester Stuttgart, Radio-Sinfonie Orchestra Cologne, I Fiamminghi and Simon Rattle and the Berlin Philharmonic Orchestra.

— Raschèr Quartet's former web site, www.rsq-sax.com

== Recordings ==
Recitals:

- Strange Exclaiming Music (2009) - Eric Moe; NAXOS 7951592
- The Concerto Project, Volume 3 (2008) - Philip Glass; OMM0042
- Victoria Borisova-Ollas - The Triumph of Heaven (2008) - Victoria Borisova-Ollas; PSCD 171
- Saxophone (2002) - Philip Glass; OMM0006
- Europe (2001) - Hindemith, Penderecki, Halffter, Nørgard, Xenakis; BIS-CD 1153
- America (1999) - Wuorinen, Corbett, Starer, Adler, Florio, Peterson; BIS-CD 953
- Music for Saxophones (1999) - Bach, Glazounov, Reich, Starer, Keuris, Koch; Cala CD 77003
- The Raschèr Saxophone Quartet (1994) - Xenakis, Bergman, Dünser, Denhoff, Bialas, Terzakis; Caprice 21435
- The Rascher Saxophone Quartet (1987) - Bach, Glaser, Karkoff, Koch, Maros, Sandstrom; Caprice 21349
- Works Of Nicola Lefanu (1986) - Karkoff, LeFanu, Maros, Urbanner; Col Legno

Concerti written for the Raschèr Quartet with Orchestra:

- In Memoriam Pehr Henrik Nordgren (2012) - Nordgren, Lapland Chamber Orchestra John Storgards, Cond.; ABCD 322
- The Eight Sounds (2011) - Beamish, Chen Yi, Stucky, Stuttgart Chamber Orchestra, Robin Engelen, Cond.; BIS-CD 1821
- Water Music (2009) - Dean, Swedish Chamber Orchestra, Heinz Karl Gruber, Cond.; BIS-CD-1576
- From Equinox to Solstice (2003) Nilsson, Hvoslef, and Kaipainen - Swedish Chamber Orchestra; BIS-CD-1203
- Robin de Raaff - Symphony No. 2 "Two Worlds Colliding" - Radio Kamer Filharmonie, Emilio Pomarico, cond.; Melodies Unheard - Challenge Records CC 72762
- Oolit (2002) - Maros, Philharmonia Hungarica, Georg Alexander Albrecht, Cond.; Caprice 21670
- Philip Glass Symphony No.2 (1998), Stuttgart Chamber Orchestra, Dennis Russell Davies, Cond.; Nonesuch 79496-2

Works for Saxophone Quartet and Voices

- Circadian Rhythms:Mathew Rosenblum (2012) - Mathew Rosenblum, Calmus Ensemble; New World Records 80736
- Chorbuch-Les Inventions Dadolphe (2012) - Mauricio Kagel, Netherlands Chamber Choir, Klaas Stok, Cond.; Winter & Winter 910 191-2
- Canticum Novissimi Testamenti II (1996) - Luciano Berio, London Sinfonietta Voices, Seymon Bychkov, Cond.; Philips 446 094-2

Works with other instruments:

- Die Kunst der Fuge (2011) - Bach, Carsten Klomp, Organ.; No Label
- New York Counterpoint (2002) - Bach, Denhoff, Grieg, Kastner, Reich, Raschèr Saxophone Orchestra, Bruce Weinberger, Cond.; BIS-NL-CD-5023
- Gubaidulina (1995) - Kroumata Percussion Ensemble; BIS-CD 710
- Anders Nilsson: KRASCH! (1995) - Gubaidulina, Nilsson, Kox, Kroumata Percussion Ensemble; Caprice 21441

== Raschèr Saxophone Orchestra ==
The Raschèr Saxophone Orchestra is a professional saxophone orchestra with 12 musicians, was founded in 1999 or 2000. It is conducted by Bruce Weinberger, the tenor saxophonist in the Raschèr Quartet, and includes among its ranks the current members of the quartet as well as some former members.
