= Laurence Wyman =

American classical saxophone teacher

Laurence Wyman is an American classical saxophone teacher who served many years as the professor of saxophone at the State University of New York at Fredonia in Fredonia, New York.

== Education ==
Wyman earned a B.A. in music theory at Maryville College and M.A. and Ph.D. degrees in music theory at the Eastman School of Music. His saxophone teachers include Orville Kiltz, Sigurd Raschèr and William Willett.

== Teaching positions ==
Wyman joined the faculty at the State University of New York at Fredonia in 1965. He taught all of the saxophone-related courses, directed the Fredonia Saxophone Ensemble, and taught courses in music theory and acoustics. He retired in 2000 and was awarded the title of professor emeritus.

Prior to coming to Fredonia, Wyman taught at the Community School in Tehran, Iran, and taught music theory at Maryville College and the Eastman School of Music.

=== Students ===
Wyman's saxophone students number over 100 and many have gone on to professional success as performers and teachers. Some teach saxophone in colleges and universities in the United States and Europe. His students include two members of the Raschèr Saxophone Quartet. Other Fredonia graduates are also members of the New York Saxophone Quartet, the Aeolian Saxophone Quartet, or the Empire Saxophone Quartet.

== Performing career ==
Wyman has been active as a soloist, recitalist, and clinician. He has performed and lectured across the United States and in countries in the Middle East, Southeast Asia, and South America. He played as a member of the Chautauqua Orchestra and the Erie Philharmonic.

== Publications and compositions ==
Wyman wrote two books, one on the acoustics of saxophone mouthpiece design and the other on difference-tones and their use in tuning harmonic intervals. He has lectured at universities on these subjects.

He has extensive experience in mouthpiece refacing and frequently does mouthpiece modifications for students and professionals.

His work in composition has included several works for saxophone. Several of his compositions have experimented with laser optics. His 1969 Saxophone Abstractions for Laser Beam and Prepared Audience was the first work to make use of a four-color krypton laser in a live musical performance.

He has developed extensive audiovisual material on saxophone pedagogy, the history of music notation, and music form. Through funding provided by the State University of New York (SUNY), he developed one of the largest university collections of music, books, and recordings pertaining to the saxophone, housed in SUNY Fredonia's Reed Library.

=== List of publications ===
- An Acoustical Study of Alto Saxophone Mouthpiece Chamber Design (Ph.D. Dissertation, Eastman School of Music, June 1972). University Microfilms, Ann Arbor, Michigan
- Tartini-Tones: An Introduction to the Aural Perception of Difference-Tones and a Method of Using Them As an Aid in Tuning Harmonic Intervals (1991)
- Twenty-Four Nemesi (2000) advanced exercises for the saxophonist

=== List of compositions ===
- Deltangi for Alto Saxophone and Four Celli (1965)
- Djiwa for Solo (any) Saxophone (1971)
- Rainfall for Tenor Saxophone and Piano (1972)
- Miniature Suite for Alto Saxophone and Piano (1995)
- Sundance for the Kid for Solo Alto Saxophone (1998)
- Rainfall for Alto Saxophone and Piano (1998 arrangement of the original piece for tenor)
