= J. Ryan Garber =

American composer of contemporary music (born 1973)

J. Ryan Garber (born 1973) is an American composer of contemporary (classical) music.

== Education ==
Garber began musical studies on the piano at age four. He subsequently became proficient on the bassoon and organ as well. His undergraduate and master's degrees are from James Madison University (Harrisonburg, VA). At JMU he studied composition from John S. Hilliard, a former student of Karel Husa and Donald Erb. His Doctor of Music degree is from Florida State University where his primary teacher was the eminent Czech-American composer, Ladislav Kubik. Other notable composers that worked (on a limited basis) with Garber on his music include: Donald Erb, Libby Larsen, Nancy Van de Vate, and Ellen Taaffe Zwilich.

== Composing career ==
Garber has composed numerous works for almost every genre, the most notable exception being opera. His music has been performed in many parts of the US as well as in Europe. For his compositions, he has been recognized and/or awarded from five national organizations.

He was named the "Tennessee Composer of the Year" by the Tennessee Music Teachers Association in 2002.

== Teaching career ==
- Garber taught composition, organ, bassoon, and music theory at Carson-Newman College in Jefferson City, Tennessee from 2000-2009.
- Garber is currently teaching music theory classes at Walters State Community College in Morristown, TN.

== Performing career ==
Along with saxophonist Richard J. Scruggs, Garber is part of the Garber-Scruggs Duo. Garber has served as a church organist in Virginia, Florida, and Tennessee.

== Partial works list ==
- Concertino, for orchestra
- Magnificat, for choir and orchestra
- Concerto for Piano and Orchestra
- Parabolisms, for alto saxophone and piano
- Resonances, for solo piano
- Another Twist, for baritone saxophone and piano, premiered by Linda Bangs, Darmstadt, Germany
- An American Song Cycle, for soprano voice and piano
- Equine Suite, for solo piano
- Eine kleine BaritonSaxophon Musik, for baritone saxophone and piano, premiered by Jonathan Annis, Carson-Newman College

== Compositions on CD ==
- Resonances, on Resonant Edges, Capstone Records
- Kettle Music, on 60x60, Vox Novus
- Another Twist, on Kammermüsik für Baritonsaxophon, Bella Musica/Antes
- Concertino, on Masterworks of a New Era, Vol. 12, ermMedia

== Partial list of performers ==
- Linda Bangs, baritone saxophone
- Mark Hussung, piano
- Richard Scruggs, alto saxophone
- Salem Choral Society
- Knoxville Wind Symphony
- Knoxville Symphony Chamber Orchestra
- Jonathan Annis, baritone saxophone
