= Patrick Meighan =

American saxophonist and educator (born 1949)

Patrick Meighan (born 1949) is an American saxophonist and educator who specializes in classical music, while also performing in jazz, rock, and pop styles. Meighan has been described in Musical America as "...most exceptional, with an otherworldly tone and fluid technique…"

== Education ==
Meighan has studied with Samuel Pattie, Galan Kral, Larry Teal, and pioneering classical saxophonist Sigurd Raschèr. He holds degrees from the Baldwin-Wallace Conservatory of Music and the University of Michigan.

== Teaching positions ==
Meighan has been Florida State University's artist-professor of saxophone since 1974, the first individual to hold the position. Students of Professor Meighan have won national and international solo and chamber music competitions - including first place in the 1999 and 2007 MTNA Young Artist Chamber Music Competitions - and hold positions on music faculties in the United States and abroad. Three former students are currently members of the internationally renowned Raschèr Saxophone Quartet.

On April 25, 2009 the "Mana Quartet" from FSU became the first saxophone quartet to win the grand prize at the 63rd Annual Coleman International Chamber Ensemble Competition.

Meighan's students have included:

- John Moore
- John-Edward Kelly
- Daniel Schmidt
- Craig Sylvern
- Christine Rall
- Michael Mortarotti
- Elliot Riley
- Kenneth Coon
- Jonathan Bergeron
- Wildy Zumwalt
- Chris Condon
- Michael Hernandez
- Dannel Espinoza
- Eric Barreto
- Noah Bedrin
- Adam Muller
- Noah Getz
- Josh Meyers
- Allen Warren
- Michael Hackbarth
- Richard Scruggs
- Styliani Tartsinis
- Joshua Hollenbeck
- Jeff Keel

Meighan has also served on the teaching staff of the Saxophone Institute, held at the University of Louisville and later at Transylvania University, for many years. He also served as a staff member of the Cardinal Saxophone Workshop, held every July at the University of Louisville.

In addition to teaching at various universities and workshops, Patrick Meighan has worked closely with Boys Town North Florida since 2003. In 2009, Meighan founded the “BT Crew” (Boys Town Crew) to encourage a love for music in Boys Town youth. The group is made up of singers and musicians, all Meighan and Boys Town youth and staff. Each year, the “BT Crew” works with Meighan for six weeks to choreograph a performance for Boys Town North Florida’s Spirit of Youth Gala.

== Performing career ==
Meighan has concertized as a soloist and ensemble recitalist throughout the continental United States, Australia, Canada, China, Europe, and South America, and has appeared in music festivals and on radio and television in Albania, Colombia, Croatia, Germany, Japan, Kosovo, Peru, Puerto Rico, and Switzerland. He has been the recipient of a 1988 Partners of the Americas Recital Grant to Colombia; a 1992 Fulbright Grant to Australia; a bronze medal at The 1993 International Chamber Music Competition and Festa in Osaka, Japan; and a 2003 U.S. Government Grant for concerts and classes at the 4th International Chamber Music Festival in Pristina, Kosovo.

He has performed with the Saxophone Sinfonia, including concerts at the 1979 World Saxophone Congress and at Alice Tully Hall.

In the 1990s he was a member of the saxophone ensemble THE TRIO, with tenor saxophonist John S. Moore and baritone saxophonist Lee Patrick.

In the late 1990s he joined with John Moore and pianist Peggy DeArmond-Rogers to form the Trio Bel Canto. Guest pianist Katrina Ross was a member of the TBC when the group performed in Brisbane, Melbourne, Perth, and Sidney during their 1992 Australian tour. With Norma Mastrogiacomo playing the piano, the group received a bronze medal at the First International Chamber Music Competition and Festa held April, 1993 in Osaka, Japan. Krista Wallace-Boaz joined the ensemble in 2003.
