= Lin Chien-Kwan =

Singaporean saxophonist (born 1972)

Chien-Kwan Lin (born 1972 in Singapore) is a classical saxophonist and teacher.

== Teaching positions ==
Since 2002, Lin has served as Associate Professor of Saxophone at the Eastman School of Music of the University of Rochester in Rochester, New York.

== Performing career ==
Lin worked for several years as a jazz violinist, and appeared as an orchestral violinist with groups in the northeastern United States, including the New Hampshire Symphony Orchestra, the Indian Hill Symphony Orchestra, and the Hanover Chamber Orchestra.

Lin has appeared as a saxophone soloist and guest artist with the Boston Philharmonic Orchestra, Rochester Philharmonic Orchestra, Eastman Wind Ensemble, New England Conservatory Symphony, United States Navy Band, U.S. Army Band, Boston Modern Orchestra Project, Tanglewood Music Center Festival Orchestra, New World Symphony Orchestra, Portland Symphony Orchestra, and the Eastman Philharmonia.

Lin has given recitals at the 28th Navy Band International Saxophone Symposium; the 13th World Saxophone Congress; Taiwan's Emerging Artists Series; and Eastman's Faculty Artist Series. He has also performed with the Eastman Virtuosi, the Fromm Players of Harvard University, the Formosa Chamber Music Society, and as a guest at the University of Cincinnati College-Conservatory.

In 2001 he presented the world premiere of Michael Colgrass's "Dream Dancer" (concerto for saxophone and band) at the Virginia Arts Festival with the United States Continental Army Band.

== Reviews ==
- His Carnegie Hall saxophone recital was reviewed by New York Concert Review's Darrell Rosenbluth, who wrote that Lin "has the passion and restraint and beautiful sense of line to take melody where it wants to go, fully and generously".
- The Boston Globe lauded him for "displaying chops" and described his playing as "polished," "charismatic," and "appealing."
- Lin won the top prize in Singapore's National Music Competition four times in the violin category.
- He won the Best Conductor Award at the 12th National Band Leaders Festival.
- Lin was profiled in Saxophone Journal in 2004.

== Recordings ==
Lin's recording of David Liptak's Serenade for Alto Saxophone and String Orchestra, which John Pitcher of the Rochester Democrat and Chronicle called "brilliantly recorded," is available on Bridge Records.

== Education ==
Chien-Kwan Lin holds a D.M.A. and Performer's Certificate from the Eastman School of Music, and received his B.M. and M.M. degrees, both with top honors, from the New England Conservatory of Music. He won the New England Conservatory Concerto Competition twice, and received the George W. Chadwick medal, bestowed each year by the Conservatory upon its most outstanding graduate.

Mr. Lin's teachers have included Kenneth Radnofsky and Ray Ricker. He resides in Rochester, New York with his wife, pianist Pi-Lin Ni.
