= John Worley =

American classical composer

John C. Worley (1919-1999) was a saxophonist, conductor, professor, and a composer of classical, as well as more contemporary music for saxophone. He was born in Waltham, Massachusetts in 1919 and died on February 16, 1999. He served as conductor and director for many performing ensembles during his long teaching career, as well as a featured performer of saxophone and clarinet.

== Conducting & performing career highlights ==
His early performances included a position as first clarinetist in the Columbus Symphony Orchestra, as well as first clarinetist in the Connecticut Symphony.

While teaching at State University College at Oneonta, NY (aka "Oneonta State", now SUNY Oneonta) Worley took charge of the community-based Oneonta Symphony (now the Catskill Symphony Orchestra) in 1947. The ensemble had been dormant since World War II decimated its ranks, and by 1953 Worley had succeeded in rejuvenating it to the point where a full concert was possible. By 1954, under his direction it had swelled to 57 musicians and began presenting local concerts for 400 people. While at Oneonta State, Worley also conducted the campus vocal group, the Choraleers, and served as music director for stage productions. After his retirement from the Symphony, Worley returned to Oneonta to perform as clarinet soloist.

He performed with the Saxophone Sinfonia at Lincoln Center in New York City; the Cape Cod Orchestra in Massachusetts; and was an active participant at several Saxophone Workshops held by friends Sigurd Raschèr and Lee Patrick.

Worley organized the Williamsburg Saxophone Quartet and was the group's soprano saxophonist.

== Education ==
He graduated from Oberlin Conservatory where he studied clarinet with George Wain, and received his Masters from the Columbia Teachers College. He studied composition with Sir Lennox Berkeley at the Royal Academy of Music in London, England and conducting with Pierre Monteux in Maine.

== Teaching positions ==
Worley taught at the University of Bridgeport, the State University of New York at Oneonta and the University of Maine in Orono in Orono before moving to Williamsburg, Virginia in 1996.

== Compositions ==
After he retired from teaching, Worley focused on composing and arranging. His original compositions include:

- Claremont Concerto for alto saxophone and orchestra (1962)
- Penobscot Suite
- Owl's Head Sonatina
- Concerto for Saxophone
- Quintet for Saxophones
- Sonatina for Baritone Saxophone
- Sonata for Tenor Saxophone and Piano
- Sea Pines Concerto for trumpet and orchestra

Transcriptions include:

- Edvard Grieg's "Holberg Suite", arranged for large saxophone ensemble
- Etienne Ozi's "Adagio et Rondo," arranged for tenor saxophone and piano
- John Dowland "Dance Suite," arranged for saxophone sextet
