= Linda Bangs =

American musician

Linda Bangs (sometimes known professionally as Linda Bangs-Urban) is a professional baritone saxophonist and was born in Waverly, Tioga County, New York.

She was a founding member of the Raschèr Saxophone Quartet and studied under Sigurd Raschèr as well as Laurence Wyman.

Bangs taught saxophone at the Academy for Music in Darmstadt, Germany. She has performed widely in the USA and Europe and appears on numerous commercial recordings.

In 1990, Bangs founded the Süddeutsches Saxophon-Kammerorchester (South German Saxophone Chamber Orchestra).

The American composer J. Ryan Garber composed Another Twist for Bangs. It was premiered in Darmstadt, Germany, on March 3, 2007, and subsequently recorded and released on the Contrasts CD.

== Discography ==
- Chamber Music for Baritone Saxophone (Coronet, 1997)
- Saxazione
- Several recordings with the Raschèr Saxophone Quartet
- Contrasts: Kammermusik für Baritonsaxophon (Antes/Bella Musica)
