= Alto saxophone =

Type of saxophone

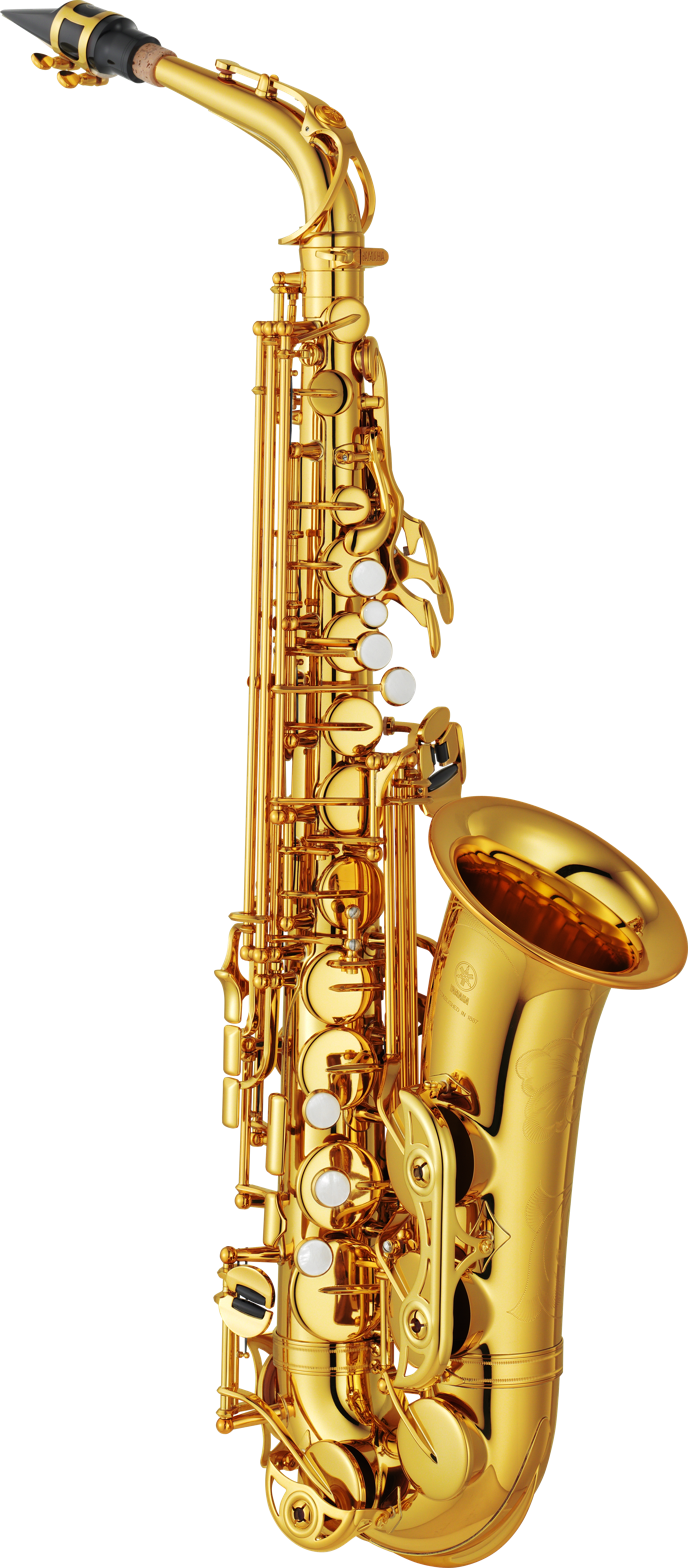
- A Yamaha alto saxophone

Woodwind instrument
- Classification: Single-reed
- Hornbostel–Sachs classification: 422.212-71 (Single-reed aerophone with keys)
- Inventor: Adolphe Sax
- Developed: 1840s

Playing range
- The alto saxophone in E♭ sounds a major sixth lower than written. Many models have a high F♯ key, and higher pitches are possible using altissimo fingerings.

Related instruments
- Sizes: Soprillo; sopranino; soprano; alto; tenor; baritone; bass; contrabass; subcontrabass; Orchestral saxophones: C soprano; mezzo-soprano; C melody; Specialty saxophones: Aulochrome; tubax

Musicians
- See list of saxophonists

The alto saxophone is a member of the saxophone family of woodwind instruments. Saxophones were invented by Belgian instrument designer Adolphe Sax in the 1840s and patented in 1846. The alto saxophone is pitched in the key of E♭, smaller than the B♭ tenor but larger than the B♭ soprano. It is the most common saxophone and is used in popular music, concert bands, chamber music, solo repertoire, military bands, marching bands, pep bands, Carnatic music, and jazz (such as big bands, jazz combos, swing music).

The alto saxophone had a prominent role in the development of jazz. Influential jazz musicians who made significant contributions include Don Redman, Jimmy Dorsey, Johnny Hodges, Benny Carter, Charlie Parker, Sonny Stitt, Lee Konitz, Jackie McLean, Phil Woods, Art Pepper, Paul Desmond, and Cannonball Adderley.

Although the role of the alto saxophone in orchestral music has been limited, influential performers include Marcel Mule, Sigurd Raschèr, Jean-Marie Londeix, Eugene Rousseau, and Frederick L. Hemke.

== Range ==
Chromatic scale
Full range (from B♭ to F, or from concert D♭ to concert A♭) chromatic scale

As with most saxophones, the alto's written range is B♭_{3} to F♯_{6}, with the higher altissimo register starting at G_{6}. The written range for some student alto saxophones, like the Yamaha YAS-26, does not include a high F♯, but the note can still be played using false fingerings. In concert (in the key of C) terms, this is from D♭ to A♭. The saxophone's altissimo register is more difficult to control than that of other woodwinds and is usually only expected from advanced players. There is no well-defined upper limit for the altissimo register, but most fingering charts go up to a written D_{8} (sounding F_{7}).

The alto saxophone is a transposing instrument, with pitches sounding a major sixth lower than written. In terms of concert pitches, the alto saxophone's range is from concert D♭_{3} (the D♭ below middle C—see Scientific pitch notation) to concert A♭_{5} (or A_{5} on altos with a high F♯ key).

A few rare alto saxophones, like some Selmer Mark VI models and some made by Couesnon, have been keyed to reach a low A, a semitone lower, similar to most baritone saxophones.

== Alto saxophonists ==
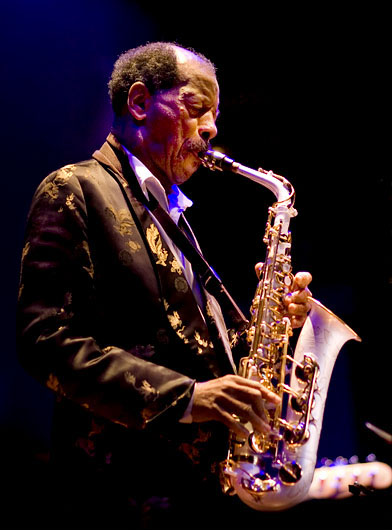
Free jazz pioneer Ornette Coleman playing a Selmer alto saxophone with a low A key

Notable jazz alto saxophonists include Charlie Parker, Cannonball Adderley, Johnny Hodges, Sonny Stitt, Paul Desmond, Benny Carter, Ornette Coleman, Lee Konitz, Bobby Watson, Eric Dolphy, Marshall Allen, Art Pepper, Julius Hemphill, Oliver Lake, Anthony Braxton, Henry Threadgill, Carlos Ward, David Sanborn, Dave Koz, Tom Scott, Paquito D'Rivera, John Zorn, Tim Berne, Steve Wilson, Steve Coleman, Greg Osby, Vincent Herring, Mark Gross, Kenny Garrett and Jeff Coffin.

Notable classical alto saxophonists include Tim McAllister, Jean-Yves Fourmeau, Lawrence Gwozdz, Donald Sinta, Harvey Pittel, Larry Teal, Kenneth Tse, Arno Bornkamp, Harry White, Otis Murphy, Claude Delangle.

Kadri Gopalnath was the pioneer of Carnatic music for the instrument. Rudresh Mahanthappa combines elements of jazz and Carnatic music for the alto saxophone like in his song Janani.

== Manufacturers ==
Companies that currently produce saxophones include Buffet Crampon, KHS/Jupiter, Conn-Selmer, Selmer Paris, Yamaha, Leblanc/Vito, Keilwerth, Cannonball, and Yanagisawa.

== Classical music repertoire ==
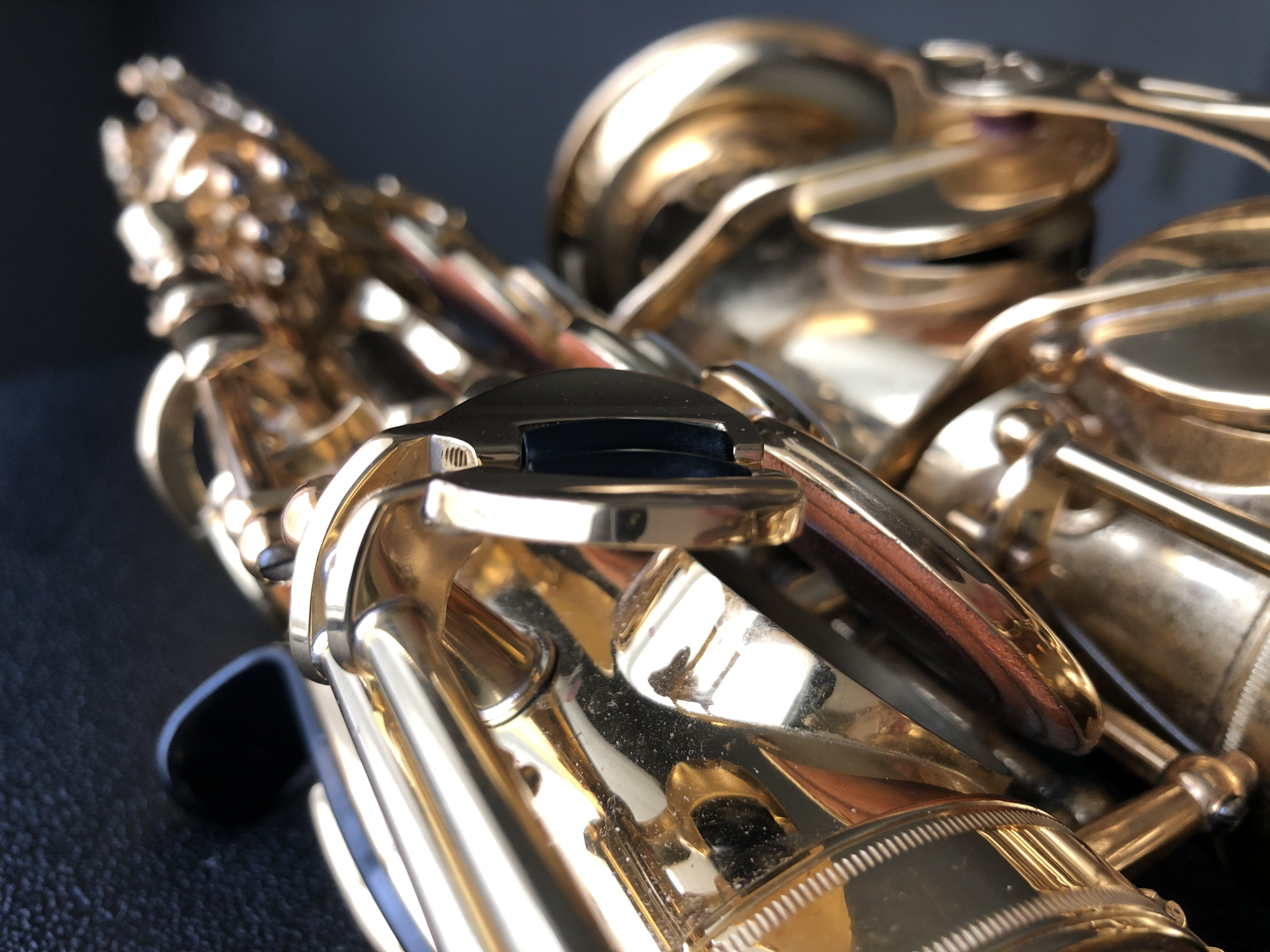
Yamaha YAS-62 alto saxophone

The alto saxophone has a large classical solo repertoire that includes solos with orchestra, piano, and wind symphony. Two important solo compositions are Jacques Ibert's "Concertino da Camera" and Alexander Glazunov's "Concerto in E♭ major".

The alto saxophone is found in the standard instrumentation of concert bands and saxophone quartets. Alexander Glazunov composed his Saxophone Quartet in B♭ major in 1932.

The alto saxophone is sometimes used in orchestral music. Some of the compositions where it appears are listed below.

- Georges Bizet features it in the "Intermezzo" and "Minuet" from the second suite of music from L'Arlésienne.
- It was called for by Richard Strauss in his Sinfonia Domestica, which includes parts for four saxophones including an alto saxophone in F.
- Dmitri Shostakovich uses the alto in his Suite for Variety Orchestra and it has a prominent solo in the "Waltz No. 2" section. He also includes it in his Suite No. 1 and Suite No. 2.
- Maurice Ravel uses the saxophone prominently in his orchestration of Modest Moussorgsky's Pictures at an Exhibition, most notably as the soloist in "Il vecchio castello".
- Alban Berg uses the saxophone in his late orchestral works, most notably "Der Wein", Lulu, and the Violin Concerto.
- Sergei Rachmaninoff uses the saxophone in his Symphonic Dances as a soloist in the first movement.
- George Gershwin includes it in a few pieces; such as Rhapsody in Blue and An American in Paris.
- Pierre Boulez wrote for 2 alto saxes in his composition Pli selon pli ("Fold by Fold").
- Benjamin Britten calls for an alto in his Sinfonia da Requiem and The Prince of the Pagodas.
- Leonard Bernstein includes an alto sax in his Symphonic Dances from West Side Story.
- Vincent d'Indy enlists two altos in his opera Fervaal.
- Darius Milhaud writes for an alto in La Creation du Monde, and places it in the score where one would expect to see a viola.
- Allan Pettersson makes use of an alto in his 16th Symphony.
- Krzysztof Penderecki scores for two altos in his opera The Devils of Loudon ("Die Teufel von Loudon").
- Aram Khatchaturian includes an alto in his ballet Gayane.
- Poul Ruders includes a significant solo for the alto saxophone in his orchestral suite Concerto in Pieces.
- Eric Coates wrote for an alto in his 1936 Saxo-Rhapsody.
- Claude Debussy features an alto in his Rhapsody for Saxophone and Orchestra.
- Paul Creston wrote a concerto for the alto, a sonata with piano, and a rapsodie with organ. He also included it in a suite for saxophone quartet.
- Ronald Binge wrote a concerto for the alto saxophone in E♭ major (1956)
- Alan Hovhaness includes an alto in his ballet Is There Survival (also known as King Vahaken) and as part of incidental music he wrote to accompany the play The Flowering Peach.
- Béla Bartók calls for an alto in his ballet The Wooden Prince (as well as tenor and baritones saxes).
- Michael Tippett employs an alto in his 1989 opera New Year (as well as soprano, tenor and baritone saxes).
- Tony Banks wrote an alto feature for the first track of his 2012 album Six Pieces for Orchestra.
- Igor Stravinsky calls for two altos in his Ebony Concerto (as well as two tenors and a baritone).
