= Roger Greenberg =

American saxophonist and saxophone teacher

Roger Greenberg is an American saxophonist and saxophone teacher.

== Teaching career ==
He taught for many years at the University of Northern Colorado and now holds the title of Professor Emeritus there.

Greenberg is an artist-clinician for the Andreas Eastman Company.

== Education ==
He received music degrees from the Juilliard School and the University of Southern California.

== Performing career ==
A classical saxophonist with a jazz background, his activities have ranged from co-leader of the Juilliard Jazz Ensemble to nightclub performer for many famous entertainers. He has been a soloist several times at the World Saxophone Congress in the United States, Canada, Europe and Japan, and continues to be active nationally as a soloist and clinician, having performed professionally in 46 states, Mexico, Canada, Thailand, Peru, Taiwan, and South Korea.

He was a member of the Tommy Dorsey Orchestra, the CBS-TV Orchestra in Philadelphia, the Los Angeles Saxophone Quartet, and during his military service, the West Point Band and the West Point Saxophone Quartet. For ten years he performed for television and motion pictures at Twentieth Century Fox and Warner Bros. studios in Los Angeles under such composers as John Williams, Jerry Goldsmith and Lalo Schifrin. For many years he was a member of the Harvey Pittel Saxophone Quartet, an internationally recognized touring ensemble.

He has performed many times with orchestras including the Los Angeles Philharmonic Orchestra and the Colorado Symphony Orchestra (formerly the Denver Symphony Orchestra), also with the Aspen Festival Orchestra, the National Repertory Orchestra, the Florida Philharmonic Orchestra, the Rochester Philharmonic Orchestra, the Sacramento Symphony Orchestra, the Rochester (Minnesota) Symphony Orchestra, the Austin Symphony Orchestra and many others. Many of these performances have been under some of the world's great conductors, including Zubin Mehta, André Previn, Michael Tilson Thomas, Philippe Entremont, Luciano Berio, Leonard Slatkin, Yuri Temirkanov, Sixten Ehrling, Sergiu Comissiona and James DePreist.

== Publications ==
Greenberg has published a book on musicianship, and several arrangements and transcriptions of music for saxophone. He has also written articles and music reviews. These publications are available through MonteVerde Music, Dorn Publications, Southern Music and Western International Music.

== Recordings ==
- A CD of music by William Schmidt, "The Art of the Tenor Saxophone," (WIM Records).
- Another solo CD, “Live in Asia”

Need details on the following:

- recordings with the Harvey Pittel Saxophone Quartet
- recordings with the Los Angeles Saxophone Quartet
- recording(s) with the Westwood Wind Quintet
- recording(s) with the Los Angeles Philharmonic Orchestra
- recording(s) the Denver Symphony Orchestra
- recording(s) with the Saxophone Orchestra of Thailand
