= Lawrence Gwozdz =

American classical saxophonist, composer and former professor of saxophone

Lawrence S. Gwozdz (/ˈɡwɑːdz/; Polish: [ɡvuɕt͡ɕ]; born April 1, 1953) is an American classical saxophonist, composer, and former professor of saxophone at The University of Southern Mississippi. His successor is Dr. Dannel Espinoza.

== Early years ==
Born to Polish-American parents in Niagara Falls, New York, Gwozdz was a pupil and longtime friend of saxophone pioneer Sigurd Raschèr.

== Career ==
=== Performing ===
He has performed in Beijing, Chicago, Leipzig, London, Los Angeles, Manchester, Prague, St. Louis, Warsaw, Zagreb, Zürich, and other cities in the US and abroad. His festival appearances have included the Yehudi Menuhin Festival, the International Chamber Music Festival of Le Touquet, Spoleto Festival USA.

Gwozdz is active in promoting, performing, and recording contemporary music. Composers including Samuel Adler, Walter Hartley, Zdeněk Lukáš, Armand Russell, Robert Starer, Roger Vogel, and John Worley have dedicated new chamber works to him. Gwozdz has also premiered full saxophone concertos by American composers Stephen Dankner, Alan Theisen, and Randall Snyder. Having been born with spina bifida, Gwozdz is also an advocate for arts for people with disabilities. His Carnegie Hall debut was described in Musical America as an "extraordinary performance of contemporary music" with "the kind of timbre Adolphe Sax most likely had in mind ... always with subtlety and taste" (The New York Concert Review). On television, Gwozdz appeared with organist Diane Bish on The Joy of Music, and has performed concerti and recitals on radio for the Dame Myra Hess series (Public Radio International), Czech Radio-Prague, Croatian Radio, Minnesota Public Radio, and other networks.

=== Teaching ===
As professor of saxophone at The University of Southern Mississippi, he established a dedicated studio. His students have performed by invitation in major cities, including performances at Washington's Kennedy Center) as soloists, quartets, and as the Sax-Chamber Orchestra. Harry Kinross White was a student of Gwozdz. Gwozdz's annotated translation of the book Das Saxophon by Jaap Kool from German into English was published by Egon Publishers Ltd (Herts, England) in 1987.

=== Sax-Chamber Orchestra ===
The Sax-Chamber Orchestra is an ensemble of eleven saxophonists founded by Gwozdz in the 1980s. Under Gwozdz's baton, they have been active in promoting the saxophone as a concert medium for over twenty years. The S-CO has premiered several large works composed specifically for them, and have showcased these compositions at venues such as the World Saxophone Congress. The ensemble, whose musicians are auditioned yearly, all play using mouthpieces constructed from Adolphe Sax's original patents. The Sax-Chamber Orchestra comprises typical members of the saxophone family (soprano, alto, tenor, baritone) as well as the less common sopranino and bass saxophones.

== Available recordings ==
- Raschèr International
- An American Concerto: Tribute to Sigurd Raschèr (1999) (with the Bohuslav Martinu Philharmonic) Albany Records TROY 331
- Simply Gifts
- Hurricane (includes Stephen Dankner's Concerto for Alto Saxophone and Orchestra) (with The Louisiana Philharmonic Orchestra)
- Special Hand'ling (2001) (music by George Frideric Handel arranged for saxophone, cello and harpsichord) Romeo Records 7216
- Glazunov and Erland von Koch: Concerti (with the Plovdiv Philharmonic)
- America Remembers (conducting the Sax-Chamber Orchestra)
- Parabolically Bach (conducting the Sax-Chamber Orchestra) Romeo Records

== Personal life ==
On December 12, 2006, Gwozdz won $7,300 as a contestant on the American game show Wheel of Fortune. In 2009, Gwozdz married Linda Duffey in La Habra, California. On January 23, 2015, Linda Duffey Gwozdz was convicted of second-degree murder in the 2007 shooting death of her former husband, Patrick Duffey, which she had contended accidentally occurred while she was either learning to use a revolver or imitating a Bugs Bunny cartoon. The case was the subject of a 2015 episode of 48 Hours, which included photographs and a short performance video of Lawrence Gwozdz, as well as him protesting her innocence.
