= Brian Elias =

British composer

Brian Elias (born 30 August 1948) is a British composer.

== Biography ==
Brian Elias was born in Bombay, India, and has lived in the UK since he was thirteen years old. After studying at the Royal College of Music under Humphrey Searle and Bernard Stevens he undertook private studies with Elisabeth Lutyens. His first major orchestral work L'Eylah was premiered at the BBC Proms in 1984. He has since had his works performed and recorded extensively by leading orchestras and soloists including the BBC Symphony Orchestra, the Britten Sinfonia, Jane Manning, Roderick Williams, Natalie Clein, and the Jerusalem Quartet. Elias collaborated with Kenneth MacMillan on his final ballet The Judas Tree, premiered in 1992 at the Royal Opera House. He has won two British Composer Awards - the first for his 2010 work Doubles, and the second for his 2013 work Electra Mourns. Elias was featured in a Wigmore Hall retrospective in April 2021.

He has taught composition at the Royal Academy of Music and the Purcell School, and his students have included Joby Talbot and Darren Bloom. His works are published by Chester Music.

== Compositions ==
=== Orchestral ===
- L’Eylah: commissioned by the BBC for the 1984 Proms. The BBC Philharmonic Orchestra conducted by Edward Downes gave the first performance at the Royal Albert Hall on 30 August 1984.
- The House That Jack Built: Commissioned by the BBC for performance by the BBC Symphony Orchestra during the 2001/2002 winter season.
- Doubles: commissioned by BBC Radio 3 for performance by the BBC Symphony Orchestra. It was completed in February 2009, and lasts approximately 26 minutes.
  - "Brian Elias’ Doubles was one of the most impressive pieces of orchestral music I have heard in a long time..." Martin Anderson, Tempo

=== Orchestra with soloist ===
- Five Songs to Poems by Irina Ratushinskaya (1989): for mezzo soprano soloist and orchestra. Commissioned by the BBC for their 1988/89 season. The texts for the songs were written by Irina Ratushinskaya, a Russian dissident poet. Many of these poems were published while she was still imprisoned.
  - "Brian Elias is not a composer to play for safety. His latest work...takes just about every possible risk, facing technical hazards in setting Russian words and putting them into the most rarely successful of musical forms, the orchestral song cycle and also going for moral danger in taking its texts from Prison poetry....Elias handles her verse with tact and care..there is such abundant inventiveness in this half-hour score. Amply gifted as an orchestral composer....the music responds directly to the mood and image, but finds a great deal else to do as well.....purified intensity, immediacy and unrestrained lyricism". Paul Griffiths, The Sunday Times
- Laments (1998): for mezzo soprano soloist and orchestra. The text is written in Grico, and based on folk tunes from Salento. Laments was commissioned by BBC Radio 3 and was completed in June 1998.
- Talisman (2004): for bass-baritone and orchestra. The text is in Hebrew and Aramaic based on the writings found on a rare amulet passed down in the composer's family. A Talisman was completed in February 2004.
- Electra Mourns: Winner of the British Composer Award 2013 Vocal Category. The work, a scena set in the original ancient Greek, was completed in January 2011. It is scored for Mezzo Soprano, solo Cor Anglais and String Orchestra, and lasts approximately 17 minutes.
- Cello Concerto: Premiered at the 2017 BBC Proms by the BBC National Orchestra of Wales, conducted by Ryan Wigglesworth, with Leonard Elschenbroich as the soloist. The work is dedicated to Natalie Clein.

=== Solo and chamber works ===
- Geranos (1984): for chamber ensemble.
- Pythikos Nomos (1987-8): for saxophone and piano. Commissioned by John-Edward Kelly.
- But When I Sleep... (1987): for solo viola.
- Birds Practise Songs in Dreams (2002): for solo clarinet. Premiered by Mark van de Wiel.
- String Quartet (2012): premiered by the Jerusalem Quartet.
- Oboe Quintet (2016): written for Nicholas Daniel and members of the Britten Sinfonia.
- Three Duets (2017): for violin and violoncello.
- L’ innominata (2018): for violoncello and piano. Commissioned by the Purbeck International Chamber Music Festival and premiered by Natalie Clein (cello) and Vadym Kholodenko (piano).

=== Career highlights ===
- 1965 - commenced informal composition studies with Elisabeth Lutyens
- 1984 - L'Eylah premiered at the BBC Proms
- 1989 - premiere of Five Songs to Poems by Irina Ratushinskaya
- 1993 - Olivier Award for Best New Dance Work for The Judas Tree
- 1999 - NVC video of The Judas Tree wins International Emmy Award for Performing Arts
- 2001 - The House that Jack Built premiered by the BBC Symphony Orchestra
- 2010 - Awarded a British Composer Award for Doubles
- 2013 - Awarded a British Composer Award for Electra Mourns

== Discography ==
- Laments; Five Songs to Poems by Irina Ratushinskaya - NMC D064
- Pythikos Nomos - Col Legno AU31817
- Fantasia - NMC D09
- Meet Me in the Green Glen - NMC DL3032 (featuring Roderick Williams & Susan Bickley).
- Electra Mourns - NMC D235 (featuring Roderick Williams, Psappha Ensemble, and the Britten Sinfonia,)
- The House That Jack Built - NMC D173 (featuring the BBC Symphony Orchestra)
- Music for Wind, Sacconi Quartet, Chamber Domaine and others. Signum Classics SIGCD796 (2024)
- Music for Strings, Castalion Quartet and others. Signum Classics SIGCD788 (2024)
