= Ray Ricker =

Ramon Ricker
- Also known as: Ray Ricker
- Born: Ramon Ricker; September 16, 1943 (age 83)
- Genres: Jazz, classical
- Occupations: Educator, performer, author, composer, arranger, producer
- Instruments: Saxophone, clarinet
- Years active: 1971–present
- Website: www.rayricker.com

Ramon "Ray" Ricker is a classical and jazz performer, music educator, composer, arranger and author.

Ricker was professor of saxophone, director of the Institute for Music Leadership and senior associate dean for professional studies at the Eastman School of Music of the University of Rochester until his retirement in 2013. He is currently professor emeritus of saxophone at the school's Institute for Music Leadership. In addition to a career as a performing artist and studio teacher, he served as director of the Catherine Filene Shouse Arts Leadership Program, was editor-in-chief of Polyphonic.org, and affiliate faculty in jazz studies and contemporary media.

As a senior administrator at Eastman, Ricker helped found Eastman's Institute for Music Leadership. Its arts leadership curriculum offers courses in entrepreneurship, careers, leadership, performance, contemporary orchestral issues and musician's injury prevention and rehabilitation; and its Center for Music Innovation. In September 2013, the Eastman School of Music honored Ricker as the first faculty member to receive the Dean's Medal in recognition of extraordinary leadership, dedication, service and philanthropy.

== Career ==
Ricker first began his musical studies on the clarinet. At age 16, while continuing to study the clarinet, his interest in jazz led him to begin taking saxophone lessons. Throughout his professional career he has continued to perform on both instruments and is often a featured saxophone and clarinet soloist and chamber musician in venues throughout Europe and North America.

He received a bachelor of music education degree in clarinet from the University of Denver (BME 1965), a master of music degree in woodwind performance from Michigan State University (MM 1967), and a doctor of musical arts degree in music education and clarinet from the Eastman School (DMA 1973). He began his tenure as a full-time Eastman faculty member in 1972 and later became the first titled saxophone professor at the school. For nine years he served as the chair of the Department of Winds, Brass and Percussion (1989–1998).

His association with the Rochester Philharmonic Orchestra began as a clarinet soloist in 1972 and in 1973 he won a position in the RPO as a member of the clarinet section. He continues to play in the orchestra today. From 1996 to 2005 he has served on its board of directors.

For eight summers (1993–2000) he was music adviser to the Schlossfestspiele in Heidelberg, Germany, where he directed the participation of the Eastman School Philharmonia in its five-week residency at the German music festival. His most recent book, Lessons From a Street-Wise Professor: What You Won’t Learn at Most Music Schools (Second Edition 2019, Soundown Music) was an award finalist in the Business: Entrepreneurship and Small Business category of USA Book News' Best Books 2011 Awards.

Ricker's doctor of musical arts (DMA) dissertation was "A Survey of Published Jazz-Oriented Clarinet Study Materials: 1920-1970". Among the jazz and popular music artists enlisting Ricker as a session and stage performer were Buddy Rich, Chuck Mangione, the Moody Blues, Warren Haynes, and the Jerry Garcia Symphonic Celebration.

Notable musicians who studied under Ricker include Chien-Kwan Lin, Bob Sheppard, Ben Wendel, Walt Weiskopf, Charles Pillow, and Andrew Sterman.

== Select bibliography ==
=== Published books ===
- Pentatonic Scales for Jazz Improvisation (1976, Alfred)
- Technique Development in Fourths for Jazz Improvisation (1976, Alfred)
- Études sur la Gamme Diminuée pour Saxophone (Etudes on the Diminished Scale for Saxophone) (1990, Alphonse LEDUC)
- Coltrane: A Player's Guide to his Harmony (co-authored with Walt Weiskopf, (1991, Jamey Aebersold)
- The Augmented Scale in Jazz (co-authored with Walt Weiskopf, 1993, Jamey Aebersold)
- The Ramon Ricker Improvisation Series (Four Volumes, 1996, Schott Music, Germany; Japanese language editions of the above published by ATN, Tokyo)
- Lessons From a Street-Wise Professor: What You Won’t Learn at Most Music Schools (First Edition 2011, Second Edition 2019, Soundown Music)

=== Published articles ===
- "The Clarinet in Jazz", parts one, two and three, Music Journal, 1973
- "A Conversation with Buddy DeFranco", International Musician, January 1974
- "To Jazz Scientists Everywhere", Jazz Educators Journal, October 1989

=== Published music - jazz ===
- "Viper Cipher", Schott Music, 1994
- "Passing Glances", Schott Music, 1994
- "Jazz Sonata for Saxophone and Piano", Schott Music, 1994
- "Morning Star", Schott Music, 1996
- "Passion Flower", Schott Music, 1996
- "Three Jazz Settings for Saxophone Quartet", Schott Music, 2000

=== Published music - non-jazz ===
- "Mein Junge Leben Hat Ein End", JP Sweelinck, transcribed for wind ensemble, G. Schirmer, 1975
- Cello suites 1, 2, 3 and 4 of JS Bach for solo saxophone, Dorn Publications, 1978
- "Solar Chariots for Soprano Saxophone and Piano", Dorn Publications, 1978
- "When I'm Sixty-four" by Lennon/McCartney, arranged for saxophone quartet, Kendor 1982

=== Recordings as a performer ===
- Eastman American Music Series Vol. 2, "Heaven to Clear When Day Did Close"
- "Jazz Sonata", Eastman American Music Series Vol. 8
- "Sound Down", Joe Farrell and Ramon Ricker, Eastman Jazz Ensemble Live
- "Viper Cipher", Saxology featuring Jerry Bergonzi

=== Record production ===
- My First Concert: Rochester Philharmonic Orchestra (1984)
- Saxology featuring Jerry Bergonzi (1996)
- Saxology featuring Bob Mintzer (1996)
- "Jazz Sonata", Eastman American Music Series Vol. 8 (1999)

=== Compositions for television and commissioned works ===
- Arrangements and orchestrations for The Late, Great Me (ABC made-for-television movie)
- Arrangements and orchestrations for Yesteryear, Dick Cavett (HBO)
- "Saints Go Marching In" for the Cincinnati Symphony's Tale of Two Cities (with J. Tyzik) for Doc Severinsen and symphony orchestra (1983)

=== Contracting and performing of television commercials and program themes ===
- NBC Sports, including themes for the 1988 Olympics
- "ABC Sunday Night Movie Theme", ABC Theater
- Cinemax and HBO's Main Movie intro and themes, HBO Championship Boxing, tennis baseball, and football
- Sports Illustrated Awards
- A&E Network main theme
