= Kenneth Radnofsky =

Ken Radnofsky
- Born: July 31, 1953 (age 72)
- Genres: Classical/Experimental
- Occupation: Performer
- Instrument: Saxophone
- Website: kenradnofsky.com

Kenneth A. Radnofsky (born July 31, 1953 in Bryn Mawr, Pennsylvania) is an American classical saxophonist. He specializes in the alto saxophone, but plays the soprano and other sizes as well. He currently teaches at the New England Conservatory of Music, and Boston University.

== Early life and education ==
Ken Radnofsky was born in Bryn Mawr, PA. His earliest musical memories were of his mother playing the organ and of his father singing as unofficial cantorial soloist at Temple Shalom in Broomall, PA.

A move to Texas at the beginning of NASA's space program, where his father was head of crew systems division, brought him to Texas' music education system. Radnofsky was inspired by many teachers, including Duncan Hale, David Salge, Harvey Pittel, Joe McMullen, Terry Anderson and Jeffrey Lerner. He attended the University of Houston for his Bachelor of Music degree.

Radnofsky completed his Master of Music degree at New England Conservatory, where he studied with Joseph Allard and worked closely with Gunther Schuller. Schuller appointed Radnofsky to the faculty upon his graduation in 1976 at the age of 23, making Radnofsky the youngest member of the faculty.

== Career ==
Radnofsky has performed throughout the Americas, Europe, and Asia, and has appeared with many orchestras around the world. He made his New York Philharmonic debut in 1996, under the direction of Kurt Masur, and made his Carnegie Hall debut several years earlier with the New York premiere of Gunther Schuller's Concerto with the National Orchestral Association. He has performed on numerous occasions as saxophonist for the Boston Symphony, including several occasions as John Williams' soloist in Franz Waxman's saxophone feature 'A Place in the Sun,' and Bernard Hermann's 'Taxi Driver' suites. He also recorded 'A Place in the Sun' with the Hollywood Bowl Orchestra under John Mauceri, and Debussy Saxophone Rhapsody with New York Philharmonic under Kurt Masur.

Radnofsky frequently commissions and performs new music. He founded World-Wide Concurrent Premieres & Commissioning Fund, Inc. to promote the creation of new works, serving as the organization's Executive Director. The composers he has commissioned for new works include Gunther Schuller, Alan Hovhaness, Yang Yong, David Amram, Michael Colgrass, John McDonald, Michael Gandolfi, Armand Qualliotine, Jaime Fatas, Pasquale Tassone, Shih-Hui Chen, Andy Vores, Lei Liang, Jakov Jakoulov, Donald Martino, Elliott Schwartz, Chris Theofanidis, Larry Bell, Milton Babbitt, Ezra Sims, Roger Bourland, Michael Horvit, Allen Johnson, Vincent Plush, Georgy Dmitriev, and John Harbison.

In 2015 Radnofsky and violinist Elmira Darvarova created the Amram Ensemble (violin, saxophone and piano), and commissioned composer David Amram for a new work 'Three Lost Loves.' He has recorded for the Teldec, Boston Records, New World, Mode, Albany-Troy, and Philips labels. Among his notable students are Daniel Bennett, Jimmy Greene, Greg Banaszak, Chien-Kwan Lin, and Randall Hall.

== Interviews ==
- Saxophone Journal (November/December 1999)
- Saxophone Journal (January/February 2005)
- Saxophone Journal (January/February 2013)

== Discography ==
- Debussy and Ravel: Orchestral Works; New York Philharmonic, Kurt Masur conducting (2010, Teldec)
- Michael Gandolfi: From the Institutes of Groove; Boston Modern Orchestra Project, Gil Rose conducting (2013, BMOP/sound)
- Alan Hovhanes: Exile Symphony; Boston Modern Orchestra Project, Gil Rose conducting (2011, BMOP/sound)
- Elliott Schwartz: Voyager, Five Works for Orchestra; New England Conservatory Honors Orchestra, Richard Hoenich conducting (2004, Albany)
- Michael Colgrass: Deja Vu, Works for Wind Orchestra; New England Conservatory Wind Ensemble, Charles Peltz conducting (2003, Mode Records)
- Donald Martino: Concerto for Alto Saxophone and Orchestra; New England Conservatory Symphony Orchestra, Richard Hoenich conducting (1998, New World Records)
- Hollywood Dreams; Hollywood Bowl Orchestra, John Mauceri conducting (1991, Philips)
