= Lee Patrick (saxophonist) =

American classical saxophonist (born 1938)

- Born: 17 November 1938 (age 87); Oneonta, New York
- Occupations: saxophonist scholar
- Years active: 1970–present

Lee Patrick (born November 17, 1938, in Oneonta, New York) is an American classical saxophonist, saxophone teacher, scholar, arranger, and composer.

== Education ==
Patrick holds a bachelor's degree from Ithaca College and a Master of Music degree from Ball State University. He holds a D.M.A. degree from the University of Kentucky (1971).

== Teaching positions ==
Patrick serves as instructor of saxophone at Transylvania University in Lexington, Kentucky.

He served as instructor of saxophone at the University of Louisville, in Louisville, Kentucky, from the 1970s through 1992.

He served as director of the Saxophone Institute, a study week for classical saxophonists, for more than 25 years. The institute was held at the University of Louisville in the 1970s through mid 1990s, and at Transylvania University through 2001.

== Performing career ==
In the 1980s and 1990s Patrick played in THE TRIO, an ensemble of alto, tenor, and baritone saxophones. Other members of THE TRIO over the years included John S. Moore, Patrick Meighan, Pete Hodson, and Rick Morgan.

He has performed with the Saxophone Sinfonia, including concerts at the 1979 World Saxophone Congress and at Alice Tully Hall in New York City.

== Compositions and arrangements ==
Patrick is widely known as an arranger of classical music for saxophone ensemble. Several of his arrangements and compositions are published as "The Lee Patrick Saxophone Series" by Carl Fischer Music.

His original compositions include:

- "Music for a Celebration" for two saxophones (of the same pitch family) (Carl Fischer)
- "Jesse Clark Threesome" for saxophone trio (Carl Fischer)
- "Shaker songs and dances" for saxophone trio (Carl Fisher)
- (need titles and publishers)

His arrangements include:

- "Solos for Alto Saxophone; 41 Recital Pieces with Piano Accompaniment" (Carl Fischer)
- "Five Famous Handel Violin Sonatas Adapted for Alto Saxophone and Keyboard" (Carl Fischer)
- Five Lyric Pieces by Edvard Grieg; arranged for tenor saxophone and piano (Carl Fisher)
- Grave from D major cello concerto by Giuseppe Tartini; transcribed by Lee Patrick for E♭ alto or E♭ baritone saxophone and piano. (Carl Fisher)
- "Lento affettuoso and giga" by James Oswald; transcribed for alto saxophone and keyboard (Ethos)
- "Five centuries for saxophone quartet" compiled and arranged by Sigurd M. Rascher and Lee Patrick (Bourne)
- "Four short pieces for saxophone quartet by Robert Schumann; arranged by Lee Patrick and Sigurd Rascher (Belwin)
- (need titles and publishers)

Several of Lee Patrick's other arrangements and transcriptions for various combinations of saxophones are published by Belwin, Bourne, Theodore Presser, and Ethos.

== Saxophone research and writing ==
Patrick served as director of scholarly publications for the North American Saxophone Alliance for many years. He has published numerous articles about saxophone history, acoustics, and pedagogy. Many of these articles were printed in Saxophone Symposium and Saxophone Journal. In 2014 he compiled and edited The Rascher Reader, a compendium of the writing on various topics by Sigurd M. Rascher.
