= Angelos Terzakis =

Greek writer (1907–1979)

Angelos Terzakis (Greek: Άγγελος Τερζάκης; 16 February 1907 – 3 August 1979) was a Greek writer of the "Generation of the '30s". He wrote short stories, novels and plays.

== Life ==
He was born in Nafplion on 16 February 1907 and lived there until 1915, when he moved to Athens, where he finished school and studied law at the University of Athens. His grandfather was a tailor, `terzi' in Greek; this is the source of his last name. He made his first appearance in Greek literature in 1925 with the short story collection The Forgotten (Ο Ξεχασμένος). He took part in the war of 1940 and documented this experience in some of his short stories and especially in his book April (Απρίλης). In 1969, he was awarded the prize of Literary Excellence (Αριστείο Γραμμάτων) of the Athens Academy.

He died on 3 August 1979 in Athens. His son, Dimitri Terzakis, is a noted composer.

== Works ==
=== Novels ===
- Prisoners (Δεσμώτες, 1932)
- The Decline of the Skleros family (Η παρακμή των Σκληρών, 1933)
- The Purple City (Η Μενεξεδένια Πολιτεία, 1937)
- Princess Isabeau (Η πριγκηπέσσα Ιζαμπώ, 1945)
- Journey with Esperus (Ταξίδι με τον Έσπερο, 1946)
- The Twilight of Men (Το λυκόφως των ανθρώπων, 1947)
- Without God (Δίχως Θεό, 1951)
- The Secret Life (Η μυστική ζωή, 1957)
- The Novel of the Four (Το Μυθιστόρημα των Τεσσάρων, 1958) (written together with Karagatsis, Myrivilis and Venezis)

=== Short story collections ===
- The Forgotten (Ο ξεχασμένος, 1925)
- Automn SYmphony (Φθινοπωρινή συμφωνία, 1929)
- Of Love and of Death (Του έρωτα και του θανάτου, 1943)
- April (Απρίλης, 1946)
- Affection (Η στοργή, 1944)

=== Plays ===
- Emperor Michael (Αυτοκράτωρ Μιχαήλ, 1936)
- Wedding March (Γαμήλιο Εμβατήριο, 1937)
- The Cross and the Sword (Ο σταυρός και το σπαθί, 1939)
- Helots (Είλωτες, 1939)
- The Master (Ο εξουσιαστής, 1942)
- The Great Game (Το μεγάλο παιχνίδι, 1944)
- Pure (Αγνή, 1949)
- Theofano (Θεοφανώ, 1956)
- Night in the Mediterranean (Νύχτα στη Μεσόγειο, 1957)
- The Happiness Ransom (Τα λύτρα της ευτυχίας, 1959)
- Thomas the Two-Souled One (Θωμάς ο δίψυχος, 1962)
- The Ancestor (Ο πρόγονος, 1970)
