= Harry White (saxophonist) =

American saxophonist (born 1967)

- Born: Henry Kinross White; 1967 (age 58–59); Mississippi, U.S.
- Genres: Classical
- Instrument: Saxophone
- Years active: 1989-present
- Website: www.harrywhite.net

Harry Kinross White (born 1967) is an American-born classical saxophonist living in Switzerland.

== Biography ==
White grew up in Mississippi and received his first music instruction there from Warren and Marti Lutz. He studied with saxophone professor Lawrence Gwozdz at The University of Southern Mississippi in Hattiesburg, Mississippi and with the pioneer of classical saxophone, Sigurd Raschèr. He graduated from The University of Southern Mississippi in 1989 with a Bachelor's Degree in Saxophone Performance.

=== Rascher Saxophone Quartet ===
He was a member of the Raschèr Saxophone Quartet from 1990 until 2001. As a member of this ensemble he performed in many of the important halls of Europe and the United States, including Carnegie Hall and Lincoln Center in New York City, the Kennedy Center in Washington, D.C., Philharmonic Hall in Berlin, the Royal Festival Hall in London, and Opéra Bastille in Paris.

=== Solo career ===
Since leaving the Raschèr Saxophone Quartet in 2001, he has been active as a saxophone soloist and free-lance musician. Critics praised White for the unique, gentle tone quality he produces on his historical saxophone and for his dynamic interpretations of old and new works. He is fascinated with the lyrical possibilities of the saxophone and recently recorded songs of Edvard Grieg, as arranged for saxophone and piano, with the composer, pianist and lied expert Edward Rushton.

He concertizes regularly with the organist Jakoba Marten-Büsing and with the pianists Hans Adolfsen, Edward Rushton and Todd Sisley. He also performs with the Swiss singer La Lupa.

As a soloist he has appeared with many orchestras, including Radio Symphony Orchestra Stuttgart, Bochumer Symphoniker, Beethoven Orchester Bonn, and the Philharmonic Orchestras in Freiburg and Heidelberg. He performs regularly in the Orchestra of the Mannheim National Theatre. He performed with Sir Simon Rattle and the Berlin Philharmonic at the New Year's Eve concert 2002.

He is member of the "Harry White Trio" (since 2006) and the "Raschèr Saxophone Orchestra" which is based in southern Germany. He is also director of the "Swiss Saxophone Orchestra".

== Recordings ==
- The Raschèr Saxophone Quartet (1994); Caprice 21435
- Anders Nilsson: KRASCH! (1995, with Raschèr Saxophone Quartet and Kroumata Percussion Ensemble); Caprice 21441
- Sofia Gubaidulina (1995, with Raschèr Saxophone Quartet and Kroumata Percussion Ensemble); BIS-CD-710
- Philip Glass Symphony No.2 (1998, with Rascher Saxophone Quartet and Stuttgart Chamber Orchestra); Nonesuch 79496-2
- America (1999, with Raschèr Saxophone Quartet); BIS-953
- Music for Saxophones (1999, with Raschèr Saxophone Quartet); Cala CD 77003
- Violeta Dinescu – Reversing Fields (1999); Sargasso SCD 28027
- Europe (2001, with Raschèr Saxophone Quartet); BIS-1153
- spectrum saxofonis (2001, with Todd Sisley, piano/harpsichord); Musicaphon M56836
- Miklós Maros – Oolit (2002, with Raschèr Saxophone Quartet); Caprice Records – CAP 21670
- Philip Glass - Saxophone (2002, with Raschèr Saxophone Quartet); Orange Mountain Music OMM0006
- New York Counterpoint (2002, with Raschèr Saxophone Orchestra); BIS-NL-CD-5023
- Amor (2002, with La Lupa, Voice, and Fabian Müller, Violoncello); Musikszene Schweiz MGB-CD-6188
- Die Felshöhle des jungen Hermann Hesse (2002); Deutsche Grammophon CD-471-899-2
- Goethe "Das Leben, es ist gut" (2003); Deutsche Grammophon CD-472-807-2
- Edvard Grieg Summer Night (2010, with Edward Rushton, piano); Musicaphon M-56851
- spectrum saxofonis vol. 2 (2011, with Jakoba Marten-Büsing, organ); Musicaphon M-56843
- Etudes-Vocalises (2016, with Edward Rushton, piano); BIS-9056
