= Sigurd Raschèr =

American saxophonist (1907–2001)

- Classical saxophonist Sigurd Raschèr

Background information
- Born: 15 May 1907; Elberfeld, Germany
- Died: 25 February 2001 (aged 93) Shushan, New York
- Genres: Classical
- Instrument: Saxophone
- Years active: 1930–1977

Sigurd Manfred Raschèr (15 May 1907 – 25 February 2001) was an American saxophonist born in Germany. He became an important figure in the development of the 20th century repertoire for the classical saxophone.

== Early life ==
Sigurd Raschèr was born in Elberfeld, Germany (now part of Wuppertal), where his father, Hans August Raschèr (1880–1952), was temporarily stationed as a military physician. His schooling began in Arlesheim, Switzerland and continued in Stuttgart, Germany, where he graduated from the first Waldorfschule. After learning piano for some time, he decided to study clarinet with Philipp Dreisbach at the Stuttgart Hochschule für Musik (1928/1929). In an interview, Raschèr said, "Obeying necessity, not following my inclination, I started to play saxophone in order to be in a dance band. As I did this for a couple of years, I became more and more unsatisfied. I started to practice furiously and slowly found out that it had more possibilities than was usually thought of."

== Career in Europe ==
In 1930 Raschèr moved to Berlin. He was called upon when the Berlin Philharmonic needed a saxophonist for a performance. This is where he met the composer and conductor Edmund von Borck (1906–1944), who composed a concerto for him in 1932. Borck's Concerto Op. 6 for Saxophone and Orchestra was performed at the General German Composers Festival in Hanover, Germany on 3 October 1932. It was such a success that the Berlin Radio Symphony Orchestra, under the baton of Eugen Jochum, gave a performance with Raschèr in Berlin on 6 January 1933. In the summer of the same year, Raschèr performed the Borck concerto again in Strasbourg at Hermann Scherchen's International Musician's Working Conference, and in 1935 he performed it with the Amsterdam Concertgebouw under the baton of Eduard van Beinum.

As Hitler rose to power in 1933, Raschèr's friend Johan Bentzon, whom he had met in Strasbourg, invited him to Copenhagen, Denmark, where Raschèr then taught at the Royal Danish Conservatory of Music. In 1934 he was in Malmö, Sweden. Over the next four years he performed concerts in Norway, Italy, Spain, Poland, England and Hungary. In April 1936 he participated in the XIV Festival of the International Society for Contemporary Music (ISCM), premiering the work Concertino da camera by Jacques Ibert. In 1938 he visited Australia, and in 1939 moved to the United States.

== Career in the United States ==
Raschèr arrived in the United States in 1939 and made his American debut on 20 October 1939 with the Boston Symphony Orchestra conducted by Serge Koussevitzky. On 11 November 1939 he was a featured soloist at Carnegie Hall with the New York Philharmonic under the baton of Sir John Barbirolli. He was the first saxophonist to appear as a soloist in a subscription concert with either orchestra.

His career continued with solo appearances in Washington, D.C. and at New York City's Town Hall in the spring of 1940, which Arturo Toscanini attended and thereupon embraced Raschèr. Due to the war in Europe, he could not return to Germany. On 4 November 1941, his wife Ann Mari, of Swedish descent, joined him in the United States where they established their home on a small farm in the rural town of Shushan in northern New York State, where they would reside for nearly 60 years.

Although he was born in Germany, publicity from the 1940s often refers to Raschèr as having come from Sweden. This reflected both his distaste for the Hitler regime, and reaction to American suspicion during that time of all things German. His international career as a soloist and his ability to gain residence and citizenship in many countries could have been damaged or destroyed if any suspicion arose about his background.

After World War II ended in 1945, Raschèr was invited to give concerts in Europe again, where he traveled for months on end, performing as soloist with many orchestras. As Raschèr's reputation grew in the United States, he also performed many orchestra concerts as soloist as well as with various university bands.

Raschèr performed as soloist with more than 250 orchestras and wind ensembles worldwide, including concerts in Europe, Asia, Australia, Canada and the United States.

His last saxophone solo performance was playing the Glazunov concerto for saxophone and string orchestra with the Vermont Symphony in 1977, on the eve of his 70th birthday.

After suffering a debilitating stroke in 1994, Raschèr died in 2001 at age 93 in Shushan, New York.

The Sigurd Raschèr Special Collections Archive is currently held at the State University of New York at Fredonia.

== Relationship with composers and premieres of major works ==
During Raschèr's life, 208 works for saxophone were dedicated to him, many counted as among the most important 20th century works for the concert saxophone.

Throughout the middle decades of the twentieth century, a preponderance of the significant new saxophone solo and chamber repertoire would appear with the familiar dedication to Sigurd M. Raschèr, the outcome of not just his ongoing commitment to motivate some of the world's finest composers, but also in part the result of genuine close friendships he developed with so many. Among them were Larsson, Glaser, and von Koch in Sweden; Jacobi, Dressel, von Knorr and Hindemith in Germany; Haba, Macha, and Reiner in Czechoslovakia; and Benson, Brant, Cowell, Dahl, Erickson, Husa, Hartley and Wirth in the United States. And it is not without significance that among all the pieces written for and dedicated to him during his life, not one was commissioned. He inspired new music, he never needed to purchase it.

Works dedicated to Raschèr include:

- Edmund von Borck: Konzert für Alt-Saxophon und Orchester, Op. 6, 1932
- Warren Benson: Concertino for Alto Saxophone and Wind Ensemble (or Orchestra, or Piano), 1955
- Ronald Binge: Concerto for Alto Saxophone and Orchestra (or Piano), 1956
- Henry Brant: Concerto for Alto Saxophone and Orchestra, 1941
- Eric Coates: Saxo-Rhapsody, 1936
- Henry Cowell: Air and Scherzo for Alto Saxophone and Small Orchestra(or Piano), 1961
- Ingolf Dahl: Concerto for Alto Saxophone and Wind Ensemble, 1949
- Werner Wolf Glaser: Allegro, Cadenza e Adagio for Alto Saxophone and Piano, 1950
- Alexander Glazunov: Concerto pour Saxophone Alto avec l'Orchestre de Cordes in E♭ Major, 1934
- Alois Hába: Suita pro Saxofon-Solo, Op.99, 1968
- Walter Hartley: Octet for Saxophones, 1975
- Paul Hindemith: Konzertstück für Zwei Altsaxophone, 1933
- Alan Hovhaness: World Under the Sea for Alto Saxophone, Harp, Tympani, Vibraphone and Gong, 1954
- Karel Husa: Elegie et Rondeau for Alto Saxophone and Piano, 1960
- Jacques Ibert: Concertino da camera pour saxophone alto et onze instruments, 1935
- Erland von Koch: Concerto for Alto Saxophone and Orchestra, 1959
- Lars Erik Larsson: Konsert för Saxophon och Stråkorkester, 1934
- Frank Martin: Ballade for Alto Saxophone, String Orchestra, Piano and Tympani, 1938
- Slavko Osterc: Sonata for Alto Saxophone and Piano, 1935
- William Grant Still: Romance for Alto Saxophone and Orchestra, 1954
- Viktor Ullmann: Slavische Rhapsodie für Orchester und Saxophon, 1940
- Maurice Whitney: Introduction and Samba for Alto Saxophone and Band (Orchestra or Piano), 1951
- Carl Anton Wirth: Idlewood Concerto, 1954, and Jephthah, 1958.

== Raschèr Saxophone Quartet ==
With his daughter Carina, Linda Bangs and Bruce Weinberger, Raschèr founded the Raschèr Saxophone Quartet in 1969, one of the first classical saxophone ensembles to perform worldwide. He remained with the quartet for its first ten years, during which it performed at major concert halls in Europe and the United States. The quartet was acclaimed by the Wiener Zeitung as the "Uncrowned Kings of the Saxophone". The quartet performed in all the countries of Europe, as well as North America, Southeast Asia, and Australia. It is the longest existing saxophone quartet.

Raschèr's tireless pursuit of classical composers is continued by the quartet, which has led more than 300 composers in 35 nations to dedicate works to the Raschèr Saxophone Quartet.

== Teaching career ==
Raschèr taught saxophone at the Juilliard School, the Manhattan School of Music and the Eastman School of Music.

Many of his students went on to become well known saxophone teachers and performers themselves, including:

- Mark Aronson
- Sylvia Baker
- Linda Bangs
- David Bilger
- Ronald Caravan
- Paul Cohen
- Rebecca Crutchfield
- Kenneth Deans
- Lawrence Gwozdz
- James Houlik
- John-Edward Kelly
- Patrick Meighan
- Michael G Montague
- John S. Moore
- Lee Patrick
- Carina Raschèr
- Michael Ried
- Richard J. Scruggs
- Ray Spires
- Styliani Tartsinis
- Bruce Weinberger
- Harry White
- Laurence Wyman
- Wildy Zumwalt
- Robert Haley

=== Raschèr Saxophone Workshops ===
After retiring from his performing career in 1977, Raschèr continued to give week-long workshops to groups of saxophonists, both in the United States and his native Germany until well into his 80s. These workshops typically attracted between 40 and 80 players of all ages, and were usually held at universities where his admirers or former students held teaching positions, such as The University of Georgia (1976 & 1977), The University of Southern Mississippi, Georgia State University, Union College, SUNY Fredonia, and Syracuse University.

Workshops featured master classes, performances by soloists and quartets, and a final concert featuring all attendees playing together as a "saxophone orchestra." The last U.S. workshop was held at Yale University in 1992 and the last European workshop was held in southern Germany in 1993.

== Saxophone tone and the saxophone mouthpiece ==
One subject that was of great importance to Raschèr was his tonal concept. He believed that when used in classical music, the saxophone should sound as its inventor, Adolphe Sax, had intended. Upon inventing the instrument, Sax had specified the shape of the interior of the instrument's mouthpiece as being large and round. All saxophone mouthpieces were made in this style until the 1940s, when the advent of big-band jazz made saxophonists experiment with different shapes of mouthpieces to get a louder and edgier sound.

Between 1940 and 1960, it became common for classical saxophonists to use narrow-chamber mouthpieces, which give the instrument a brighter and edgier sound. Whenever he taught or lectured to saxophone players, Raschèr emphasized that the modern mouthpieces were not what Sax had intended, and the sound they produce, while useful to a jazz player who requires a loud penetrating sound, was not appropriate in classical music. His students and other disciples felt that the desirable tone for a classical saxophone was a softer, rounder sound—a sound that can only be produced by a mouthpiece with a large, rounded interior (often referred to as an "excavated chamber"). His steadfast and irascible insistence in this area, while nearly all the world's classical saxophonists were moving to narrower mouthpieces (along with saxophones with a non-parabolically expanding bore) and a brighter tone, resulted in quarrels with, and alienation from, the majority of the classical saxophone world. There were other ways in which his playing differed from the majority of classical saxophonists; these included his insistence on using the slap tongue as a pizzicato technique, and his use of flutter-tonguing.

By 1970, narrow-chambered mouthpieces had become nearly universally popular, and mouthpiece manufacturers ceased production of large-chambered mouthpieces. This meant that Raschèr's students had difficulty finding mouthpieces that would produce the tone they desired. For a period of time the only large-chambered mouthpieces were ones that had been manufactured in the 1920s and 1930s, leading Raschèr students to search pawn shops and other sources of old instruments.

Raschèr responded to this lack of supply by engaging a manufacturer to make a "Sigurd Raschèr brand" mouthpiece, which was simply intended to duplicate a type of mouthpiece that had been readily available from American saxophone manufacturers Buescher, Conn and others in the 1920s. The Raschèr mouthpiece is still manufactured today.

== Upper register of the saxophone ==
Raschèr's teaching included an emphasis on the use of the saxophone's upper register. As early as 1930 he demonstrated that an advanced player can achieve a range of four octaves on the saxophone, despite the fact that few players at that time ever played beyond the conventional range of two and a half octaves. This upper range became known as the "altissimo register", but Raschèr himself refused to use that term, preferring to call the notes in question "top tones".

A few players played above high F before 1940, including H. Benne Henton of the Conway Band c. 1911 (to high D), Dick Stabile, an early jazz artist (to high F), and Jascha Gurewitz, an early recitalist (to high F#).

Raschèr was vocal in encouraging composers to make use of this range. He was eager to demonstrate his command of these "top tones", and argued that their use was musically legitimate, not a trick or novelty. His book on the subject, Top-Tones for the Saxophone, was published in 1941 and remains highly regarded.

To better demonstrate that the technique of playing tones above high F had its basis in the natural overtone series of the saxophone, he had the Buescher factory create a custom instrument for him: a saxophone body with no tone holes at all. A picture of this instrument is in the Top Tones book. He demonstrated that it was possible to play at least 16 overtones on this keyless instrument, as well as on a conventional saxophone, and claimed that diligent study of the technique of playing overtones was the best way to gain a command of the upper range and improve overall tone quality.

The saxophone's altissimo register was controversial throughout the middle of the 20th century, and Raschèr stirred the controversy among the classical saxophone community by insisting that the instrument's inventor, Adolphe Sax, had intended the instrument to be played in this manner. Raschèr cited evidence that Sax had demonstrated a three-octave range (up to a high C) to composers in the 1840s.

Despite the initial resistance on the part of the saxophone community to the altissimo register, it has since come to be an accepted technique, and is utilized by nearly all classical and jazz saxophonists. Despite its difficulty, it is now commonly taught to advanced high school and college students, and has become a required skill for any student who desires a degree in saxophone performance.

During the earlier decades of his career, many saxophonists resisted and even ridiculed his pioneering work in extending the upward range of the instrument beyond two and a half octaves. Composers, however, were more inclined to embrace this expanded expressive capability that Mr. Rascher had singularly fostered. By [1977], his lifelong commitment to the saxophone's high register, coupled with the momentum provided by so many composers who used it, had served to establish the extended range as an essential element of modern artistic saxophone performance.

— Ronald Caravan

== Recognition and awards ==
- He was awarded the Band Masters of America Award for distinguished artists
- Honorary Life Member of the North American Saxophone Alliance
- Kappa Kappa Psi Distinguished Service to Music Medal
- Initiated as honorary brother of Phi Mu Alpha Sinfonia
