= World Saxophone Congress =

Festival gathering for saxophonists

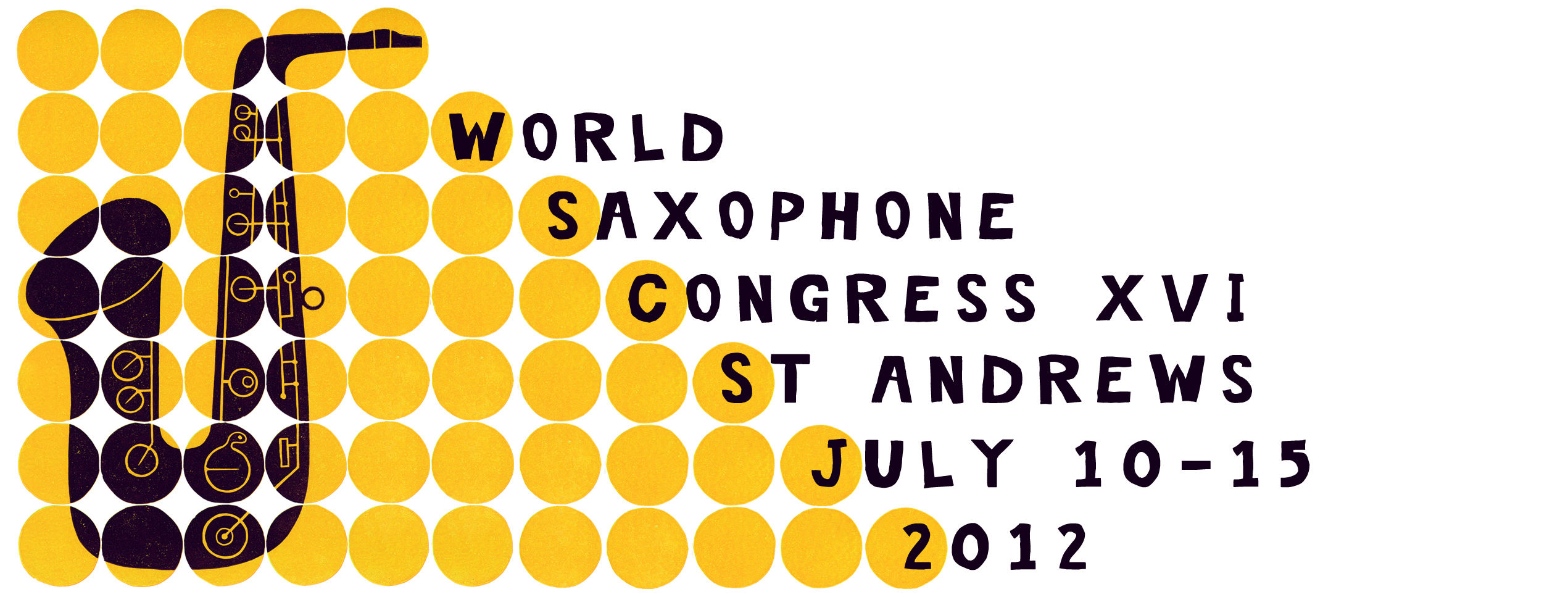
Logo of World Saxophone Congress 2012 St Andrews

XV World Saxophone Congress at Bangkok, Thailand. Promotional logo

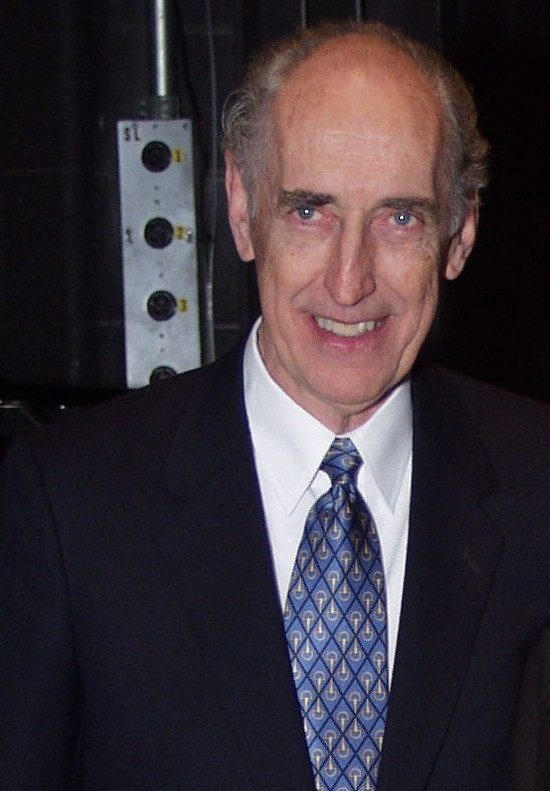
World Saxophone Congress co-founder Eugene Rousseau

14th World Saxophone Congress at Ljubljana, Slovenia. Promotional logo

The World Saxophone Congress is a festival gathering approximately 1000 saxophonists and other musicians from all over the world. It is held every three years at a different congress centre in a different country and focuses primarily (although not exclusively) on the performance of classical saxophone music.

The Congress presents an opportunity to meet saxophonists from many countries and to listen to various concerts and performances of saxophone soloists, chamber ensembles, big bands and symphony orchestras that run simultaneously throughout the day in different halls of the congress centre. Each of the five days is concluded by an evening concert of the orchestra and outstanding international soloists. It is also convened with the purpose of presenting the advancements of music production and distribution as well as innovations in instrument-making and equipment.

The seventeenth World Saxophone Congress, known as SaxOpen, was held between 9 and 14 July 2015 in Strasbourg France. The eighteenth World Saxophone Congress took place in 2018 in Zagreb, Croatia.

== Origins ==
The World Saxophone Congress was conceived by Paul Brodie (1934 – 2007) and co-founded in 1969 with Eugene Rousseau (1932 - 2024), holding their first Congress in Chicago. Eugene Rousseau writes:

"The most memorable time I spent with Paul [Brodie] was our December, 1968 meeting in Chicago. It was during this meeting that he articulated his vision of the establishment of a world saxophone congress. It came to fruition in conjunction with the Midwest Band Clinic during the following year. The World Saxophone Congress, thanks to the dream of Paul Brodie, had become established."

Paul Brodie himself recalls:

"I went to an accordion congress in Toronto and I was so impressed that I thought "wouldn’t it be great to do this for the saxophone".... The next year I came back to the Midwest Band Clinic. I had written an article for Instrumentalist Magazine - "Towards a World Saxophone Congress", and I was invited to a meeting of the executive committee and they offered me the grand ballroom of the Sherman House Hotel for 16 December 1969. I asked other saxophone players to help me and nobody responded. I called Eugene Rousseau because I had met him in Seattle at a music convention.... So we met in September 1969 at the Holiday Inn at O’Hare Airport in Chicago and we stayed up all night designing the program and started to call everybody the next morning and by the time we held the first congress we thought that maybe 200 people would show up. Well over 500 saxophonists showed up."

In 1981, a 7-member International Saxophone Committee (in French, Comite International du Saxophone, CIS). was set up to help organise the Congress.

== Performers and participants ==
Congress performers/participants have included Frederick Hemke, Eugene Rousseau, Donald Sinta, Patrick Meighan, Bruce Faulconer, One O'Clock Lab Band, Lee Patrick, Ronald Caravan, Paul Brodie, Lin Chien-Kwan, Roger Greenberg, Debra Richtmeyer, Kyle Horch, the Scottish Saxophone Ensemble, the National Saxophone Choir of Great Britain, and Brian Brown

== Venues ==
The World Saxophone Congress has been held in:

	No.	Location	Dates	Year
1st	I	Chicago, USA	16 Dec	1969
2nd	II	Chicago, USA	14-15 Dec	1970
3rd	III	Toronto, Canada	Aug	1972
4th	IV	Bordeaux, France	3-6 July	1974
5th	V	London, UK		1976
6th	VI	Evanston, USA		1979
7th	VII	Nuremberg, Germany	7-11 July	1982
8th	VIII	Washington, D.C., USA		1985
9th	IX	Tokyo, Japan		1988
10th	X	Pesaro, Italy		1992
11th	XI	Valencia, Spain		1997
12th	XII	Montreal, Canada	5-9 July	2000
13th	XIII	Minneapolis, USA	9-12 July	2003
14th	XIV	Ljubljana, Slovenia	5-9 July	2006
15th	XV	Bangkok, Thailand	8-12 July	2009
16th	XVI	St Andrews, Scotland	10-15 July	2012
17th	XVII	Strasbourg, France	9-14 July	2015
18th	XVIII	Zagreb, Croatia	10-14 July	2018
~~19th~~	~~XIX~~	~~Kurashiki, Japan~~ CANCELLED	~~Jul~~	~~2021~~
19th	XIX	Las Palmas, Spain	6-10 Dec	2023
20th	XX	Harbin, China	26-31 July	2025

== Bibliography ==
- Richard Ingham, The Cambridge Companion to the Saxophone, Cambridge University Press, 1998, ISBN 0-521-59666-1
- Thomas Liley, Paul Brodie, Eugene Rousseau, A brief history of the World Saxophone Congress: 1969-2000, World Saxophone Congress, Published 2003, 42 pages
