= Pehr Henrik Nordgren =

Finnish composer (1944-2008)

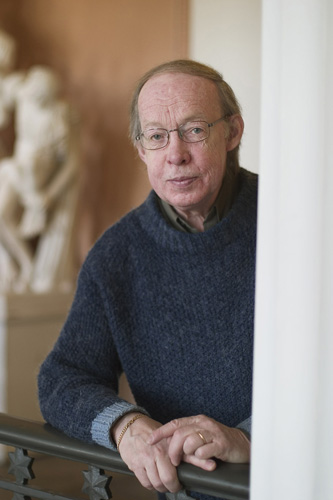
- Born: 19 January 1944; Saltvik, Åland, Finland
- Died: 25 August 2008 (aged 64); Veteli, Finland
- Occupation: Composer

Pehr Henrik Nordgren (19 January 1944 – 25 August 2008) was a Finnish composer.

== Life ==
Pehr Henrik Nordgren was born in Saltvik, Åland, on 19 January 1944. received composition lessons starting from 1958 in Helsinki and studied musicology at the university from 1962 to 1967, as well as receiving private tuition from Joonas Kokkonen from 1965 to 1969. At the Tokyo University of the Arts, he supplemented his composition studies from 1970 to 1973 with Yoshio Hasegawa and became acquainted with traditional Japanese music, which soon became an influence in his works. He nd composed two quartets for traditional Japanese instruments and what Christoph Schlüren described as "the fascinating Autumnal Concerto for traditional Japanese instruments and Western orchestra".

In 1973, he married Shinobu Suzuki in Tokyo, and returned to Finland where he established himself in Kaustinen, a small place in Central Ostrobothnia, as a freelance composer. Kaustinen is the center of folk music in Finland; folk music festivals take place all summer long with travellers coming from around the world. Thus Nordgren concerned himself now with the music of his country. He founded the Kaustinen Chamber Music week which he directed for many years.

He maintained a co-operation with the Ostrobothnian Chamber Orchestra and its leader Juha Kangas, which led to an abundance of orchestral works.

Nordgren's style stems from the twelve tone technique, as well as the use of tone clusters by György Ligeti, while also utilising many other elements of contemporary composition instead of following any single designated tradition. Nordgren's music also features elements of traditional Japanese music (e.g. in the Kwaidan Ballads for piano), sometimes combining elements and instruments of Japanese music with those of Finnish folk music, particularly the kantele. Central to Nordgren's œuvre are works for strings, whether in concertos, pieces for string orchestra (e.g. Portraits of Country Fiddlers, one of his most often performed orchestral works), string quartets or sonatas.

He died in Veteli, aged 64.

== Works ==
=== Opera ===
- Den svarte munken (The Black Monk), chamber opera in 8 scenes, Op. 52 (1981, 2005)
- Alex, television opera, Op. 56 (1982–1983)

=== Orchestra ===
- Euphonie I , Op. 1 (1966)
- Épiphrase, Op. 4 (1967)
- Euphonie II, Op. 5 (1967)
- Minore, Op. 6 (1968)
- Koko maailma valittanee (The Whole World Will Lament) for strings orchestra, Op. 26b (1966, revised 1974)
- The Turning Point, Op. 16 (1972)
- Symphony No. 1, Op. 20 (1974)
- Euphonie III, Op. 24 (1975)
- Pelimannimuotokuvia (Portraits of Country Fiddlers) for string orchestra, Op. 26 (1976)
- Summer Music , Op. 34 (1977)
- Häjyt (The Evil Braggarts), Music for the television play, Op. 38 (1977)
- Tuolla mun heilani asuskeloo (Yonder Lives My Sweet Love) for string orchestra, Op. 40 (1977)
- Symphony for Strings, Op. 43 (1978)
- Concerto for Strings, Op. 54 (1982)
- Jumala on kauneus (God Is Beauty), Music for the television play, Op. 64 (1984)
- Elegia Vilho Lammelle (Elegie for Vilho Lampi), Op. 65 (1984)
- Transe-Choral for 15 strings, Op. 67 (1985)
- Symphony No. 2, Op. 74 (1989)
- Cronaca for string orchestra, Op. 79 (1991)
- Streams for chamber orchestra, Op. 80 (1991)
- Symphony No. 3, Op. 88 (1993)
- Equilibrium for 19 strings, Op. 94 (1995)
- Chamber Symphony, Op. 97 (1996)
- Symphony No. 4, Op. 98 (1997)
- Yamagata Rhapsody, Op. 99 (1997)
- Kallioon piirretty (Rock Score) for string orchestra, Op. 100 (1997)
- Symphony No. 5, Op. 103 (1998)
- Symphony No. 6 Interdependence for soprano, tenor, mixed choir and orchestra, Op. 107 (1999–2000)
- Solemnity-Euphony for 19 strings, Op. 118 (2002)
- Symphony No. 7, Op. 124 (2003)
- Kuvia maaseudun menneisyydestä (Pictures of the Country's Past; Pictures of Rural Past), Free Adaptations of Finnish Folk Tunes for string orchestra and harp, Op. 139 (2006)
- Symphony No. 8, Op. 140 (2006)

=== Large chamber ensemble ===
- Nachtwache (Night Watch), Suite for the Music to a Radio Play for 3 clarinets, horn, percussion (5 players), piano, harp, violin, viola and cello, Op. 3 (1967)
- Neljä kuolemankuvaa (Four Pictures of Death) for chamber ensemble, Op. 8 (1968)
- Euphonie IV for big band, Op. 51 (1981)
- Fate-Nostalgia for clarinet, violin, piano and 12 cellos, Op. 72 (1989)
- Programme Music for flute (piccolo and alto flute), oboe, clarinet, bassoon, horn, percussion, 2 violins, viola, cello and double bass, Op. 76 (1990)

=== Concertante ===
- Violin Concerto No. 1, Op. 10 (1969)
- Viola Concerto No. 1, Op. 12 (1970)
- Concerto for clarinet, folk instruments and small orchestra, Op. 14 (1970)
- Autumnal Concerto for traditional Japanese instruments (shakuhachi, shamisen, koto, jūshichi-gen) and orchestra, Op. 18 (1974)
- Piano Concerto No. 1, Op. 23 (1975)
- Violin Concerto No. 2, Op. 33 (1977)
- Viola Concerto No. 2, Op. 48 (1979)
- Cello Concerto No. 1, Op. 50 (1980)
- Violin Concerto No. 3, Op. 53 (1981)
- Cello Concerto No. 2, Op. 62 (1984)
- Kantele Concerto No. 1, Op. 66 (1985)
- Viola Concerto No. 3, Op. 68 (1986)
- Hate-Love for cello and string orchestra, Op. 71 (1987)
- Phantasme for alto saxophone and orchestra, Op. 81 (1992)
- Cello Concerto No. 3, Op. 82 (1992)
- Concerto for viola, double bass and chamber orchestra, Op. 87 (1993)
- Cello Concerto No. 4, Op. 89 (1994)
- Violin Concerto No. 4, Op. 90 (1994)
- Alto Saxophone Concerto, Op. 92 (1995)
- Trumpet Concerto, Op. 93 (1995)
- Horn Concerto, Op. 95 (1996)
- Trombone Concerto, Op. 102 (1998)
- Kantele Concerto No. 2, Op. 106 (1999)
- Concerto for saxophone quartet and string orchestra with gong, Op. 108 (2000)
- Oboe Concerto, Op. 116 (2001)
- Piano Concerto No. 2, Op. 112 (2001)
- Guitar Concerto, Op. 126 (2003–2005)
- Piano Concerto No. 3 for piano left hand, Op. 129 (2004)
- Accordion Concerto, Op. 133 (2005)
- Cello Concerto No. 5, Op. 135 (2005)
- Organ Concerto, Op. 143 (2007)

=== Chamber and instrumental music ===
- String Quartet No. 1, Op. 2 (1967)
- String Quartet No. 2, Op. 7 (1968)
- Sonatina per sestetto for flute, clarinet, violin, cello, piano and percussion, Op. 9 (1969)
- Kolme maanitusta (Three Enticements), Woodwind Quintet No. 1, Op. 11 (1970)
- Ritornello for violin and piano, Op. 13 (1970)
- Quartet No. 1 for Traditional Japanese Instruments for shakuhachi, shamisen, koto and jūshichi-gen, Op. 19 (1974)
- As in a Dream for cello and piano, Op. 21 (1974)
- Woodwind Quintet No. 2, Op. 22 (1975)
- String Quartet No. 3, Op. 27 (1976)
- Butterflies for guitar solo, Op. 39 (1977)
- In Patches for accordion solo, Op. 41 (1978)
- Quartet No. 2 for Traditional Japanese Instruments "Seita" for shakuhachi, 2 kotos and jūshichi-gen, Op. 42 (1978)
- Piano Quintet, Op. 44 (1978)
- A Late Pastorale for horn and string quintet (2 violins, viola, cello and double bass), Op. 47 (1979)
- Piano Trio, Op. 49 (1980)
- Equivocations for kantele and string trio, Op. 55 (1981)
- String Quartet No. 4, Op. 60 (1983)
- Epilogue for cello and piano, Op. 61 (1983)
- String Quartet No. 5, Op. 69 (1986)
- String Quartet No. 6, Op. 73 (1989)
- Going On for double bass and percussion, Op. 77 (1991)
- Sonata for solo cello, Op. 83 (1992)
- Sculpture-Fanfare for 3 trumpets and 3 trombones, Op. 84 (1992)
- String Quartet No. 7, Op. 85 (1992)
- Sonata for violin and piano, Op. 86 (1992)
- Distance-Dream for cello and accordion, Op. 101 (1997)
- Pieni mollipolska (Little Polka in a Minor Key) for 2 violins and accompaniment (1997)
- Sonata for solo violin, Op. 104 (1999)
- String Quartet No. 8, Op. 105 (1999)
- Zest for saxophone, cello and piano, Op. 109 (1999)
- String Quintet for 2 violins, viola and 2 cellos, Op. 110 (2000)
- Tuulimyllyfantasia (Wind Mill Fantasy) for 3 accordions, Op. 113 (2001)
- Quintet for guitar and string quartet, Op. 119 (2003)
- Quartet for clarinet, violin, cello and piano, Op. 121 (2003)
- Come da lontano for guitar solo, Op. 122 (2003)
- String Quartet No. 9, Op. 125 (2004)
- Klippgrund (Reefs) for cello and guitar, Op. 128 (2004)
- A Viking in Kaustinen, Polka for 2 violins and double bass, Op. 131 (2004)
- Spellbound Tones for horn, guitar and cello (all playing additional percussion instruments), Op. 132 (2005)
- String Quartet No. 10, Op. 142 (2007)
- String Quartet No. 11, Op. 144 (2008)

=== Piano ===
- Kymmenen ballaadia japanilaisiin kauhutarinoihin (Kwaidan-balladit) (10 Ballads after Japanese Ghost Stories or "Kwaidan" by Lafcadio Hearn; 小泉八雲の怪談によるバラード) (1972–1977)
1. Miminashi-Hōichi (耳なし芳一; Hōichi the Earless), Op. 17 (1972)
2. Mugen-kane (無間鐘), Op. 28 (1976)
3. Mujina (むじな), Op. 30 (1976)
4. O-tei (お貞), Op. 29 (1976)
5. Oshidori (おしどり), Op. 25 (1976)
6. Rokuro-kubi (ろくろ首), Op. 32 (1976)
7. Yuki-onna (雪女), Op. 31 (1976)
8. Akinosuke-no-yume (安芸之助の夢; The Dream of Akinosuke), Op. 35 (1977)
9. Jyūroku-zakura (十六ざくら), Op. 36 (1977)
10. Jikininki (食人鬼), Op. 37 (1977)
- Kwaidan II, Three Ballads after Japanese Ghost Stories for piano left hand, Op. 127 (2004)

=== Vocal ===
- Lávllaráidu Nils-Aslak Valkeapää divttai'e (Song Cycle to Poems by Nils-Aslak Valkeapää) for baritone (originally alto), cello and piano, Op. 45 (1978)
- Fyra sånger till dikter av Edith Södergran (Four Songs to Poems by Edith Södergran) for soprano and piano, Op. 58 (1982)
- Nacht der Nächte (Night of Nights) for 2 sopranos, violin, cello and piano, Op. 114 (2000)
- Ei ne kaikki kuollehia (Not Everyone Dead) for soprano and piano, Op. 115 (2001)
- Sångcykel till dikter av Edith Södergran (Song Cycle to Poems by Edith Södergran) for mezzo-soprano, string orchestra and harp, Op. 123 (2003)
- Kuun lapset (Children of the Moon) for baritone, 2 violins, viola, cello and double bass (2005)
- Seven Poems from the Collection Ogura Hyakunin Isshu for mezzo-soprano and guitar, Op. 137 (2006)

=== Choral ===
- Agnus Dei for soprano, baritone, mixed choir and orchestra, Op. 15 (1971)
- Maan alistaminen (The Subjection of Earth) for mixed choir (1973)
- Väinämöisen rukous (Väinämöinen's Prayer) for mixed choir (1973)
- Kuninkaan kämmenellä (In the Palm of the King's Hand), Cantata for soprano, baritone, male choir, children's choir and orchestra, Op. 46 (1979)
- Taivaanvalot (The Lights of Heaven) for soprano, tenor, mixed choir, children's choir, folk instruments and string orchestra, Op. 63 (1985)
- Perpetuum mobile for male choir, Op. 75 (1989)
- Beaivi, áhčážan (The Sun, My Father) for 3 mezzo-sopranos, tenor, bass, mixed choir and orchestra, Op. 70 (1990)
- Odotus (Awaiting) for male choir, Op. 78 (1991)
- Laulu köyhyydestä (Dialogue on Poverty) for mixed choir, Op. 96 (1996)
- Symphony No. 6 Interdependence for soprano, tenor, mixed choir and orchestra, Op. 107 (1999–2000)
- Te Deum for soprano, bass, mixed choir and orchestra, Op. 111 (2000)
- Tuuri, Dramatic Ballade for tenor, bass, mixed choir and orchestra, Op. 117 (2002–2003)
- Amor Desesperada, 4 Pieces after Pablo Neruda's 20 Poemas de amor, y una canción desesperada for soprano, baritone, koto, shakuhachi and double bass, Op. 120 (2003)
- De sole et luna for mixed choir and string orchestra, Op. 138 (2006)
