= Tristan Keuris =

Dutch composer (1946–1996)

Tristan Keuris (3 October 1946 in Amersfoort – 15 December 1996 in Amsterdam) was a Dutch composer.

== Life and career ==
Keuris initially studied with Jan van Vlijmen in Amersfoort. At the age of 15 he started his studies with Ton de Leeuw at the Utrecht Conservatory. Upon graduating from the conservatory he received the 'Prijs voor compositie' (1969). He strongly admired composers like Mahler, Webern and Stravinsky. He taught composition at the conservatories in Hilversum, Utrecht and Amsterdam. He also taught at masterclasses and gave lectures in the United States, Norway, Germany and the United Kingdom. Keuris received international recognition with the symphonic work Sinfonia (1972/74), first performance in 1976. Many of Tristan Keuris’ works were written on commission, like the Saxophone Quartet Concerto (1986) on commission from the Dutch Government, Catena (1988), for the 100th anniversary of the Royal Concertgebouw Orchestra, Symphonic transformations (1987) for the Houston Symphony Orchestra and the Concerto for two cellos (1992) for the BBC (Manchester Cello Festival).

== Awards ==
- 1975 Matthijs Vermeulenprijs (for 'Sinfonia')
- 1982 Cultuurprijs van Hilversum
- 1995 Koussevitzky Foundation Award

== Works ==
- 3 preludes for piano (1959, manuscript)
- Baldur en de bosnymph - symfonisch gedicht (1960, manuscript)
- Wind quintet (after Schönberg, 1962, lost)
- String quartet (1963)
- Songs on texts by Guillaume de Machaut (1964, lost?)
- Quartet for Orchestra (1967)
- Libra for clarinet and piano (1967?)
- Quartet no.2 for orchestra (1969, published by Donemus, withdrawn before its 1st public performance)
- Piano sonata (1970)
- Altosaxophone concerto (1971)
- Music for clarinet, violin and piano (1973)
- Sinfonia (1972-'74)
- Serenade for oboe and orchestra (1976)
- Fantasia for flute solo (1976)
- Piano concerto for Theo Bruins (1976, not identical with the 1980 concerto, unfinished short score)
- Violin sonata (1977)
- Concertino (1977 rev '78)
- Capriccio (1978)
- Piano concerto (1980)
- 8 Miniatures (1980)
- Movements for orchestra (1981)
- Divertimento (1982)
- String quartet no.1 (1982)
- 7 Pieces for orchestra with bassclarinet (1983)
- Clarinet quartet (1983)
- Violin Concerto no.1 (1984)
- Pianotrio (1984)
- String quartet nr.2 (1985)
- Variations for Strings (1985)
- Aria for flute and piano (1985, premiered November 27, 1985 in Wageningen)
- Concerto for Saxophone quartet and orchestra (1986)
- Music for Saxophones (Saxophone quartet no.2) (1986)
- Aria for flute and orchestra (1987) (for the Scheveningen Muziek Concours 1988)
- Symphonic Transformations (1987)
- To Brooklyn Bridge (1987)
- Intermezzi for winds (1988)
- Catena (1988)
- Quintet for Clarinet and Strings (1988)
- 5 Pieces for Brass Quintet (1988)
- 3 Sonnets for altosaxophone and orchestra (1989)
- Canzone (1990)
- Passegiate for 4 recorders (1990)
- L'Infinito (1990)
- Michelangelo Songs (1990)
- Antologia for Orchestra (1991)
- Concerto for 2 'cellos and orchestra (1991/92)
- Concerto for organ and orchestra (1993)
- Laudi - a symphony for soloists, choir and orchestra (1993)
- 3 Preludes for Orchestra (1994)
- String sextet (1994)
- Chamber concerto (1995)
- Symphony in D (1995)
- Arcade - 6 more preludes for orchestra (1995)
- violin concerto no.2 (1995)
- Songs on German texts (1996, short score only, unfinished)
- Work for 8-part female chorus (1996, sketches)
- clarinet concerto (1996, sketches)

Keuris also composed music for television and radio commercials (1970s) and filmscores for "De Mannetjesmaker" and "Oeroeg"

== Discography ==
On the Emergo Classics label:

- To Brooklyn Bridge (1988) for 24 voices and ensemble
- Intermezzi (1989) for wind ensemble
- L'infinito (1990) for vocal quintet and ensemble
- Violin Concerto No. 2 (1995)
- Symphony in D (1995)
- Laudi (1992/93) A symphony for mezzo-soprano, baritone, two mixed choirs and orchestra
- Arcade (1995) Six preludes for orchestra
- String Quartet No.1 (1982)
- String Quartet No.2 (1985)
- Clarinet Quartet (1988) for clarinet and string quartet
- Concertino for string quartet and bass clarinet (1976/77, rev. 1979)

On the Challenge Records International label: Complete Works (2010)
