= Miklós Maros =

Hungarian composer (born 1943)

Miklós Maros (born 14 November 1943) is a Hungarian composer. He was born in Pécs, the son of composer Rudolf Maros and violinist Klára Molnár. He studied at the Béla Bartók Conservatory in Budapest with Rezső Sugár and at the Ferenc Liszt Music Academy with Ferenc Szabó, and continued his studies in Stockholm with Ingvar Lidholm and György Ligeti.

From 1971 to 1973, Maros was composition teacher at the Stockholm Secondary School of Music. From 1971 to 1978, he taught at the Studio for Electronic Music (EMS) in Stockholm, and from 1976 to 1980 he taught at Stockholm Musikcollege. From 1980 to 1981, he was a guest of the Berlin Artists Program of the German Academic Exchange Service in West Berlin. In 1972 he and his wife, singer Ilona Maros, formed the Maros Ensemble for the performance of contemporary music. In 1990 Maros received the Lifetime-Artists’ Award of the Swedish Government.

== Works ==
In addition to two operas, he composed many works for chamber ensembles, symphonic works, concertos and vocal works. Selected compositions include:

Stage

- Stora Grusharpan (The Large Gravel Harp), opera, 1982
- Castrati - Neuter, opera, 2002

Orchestral

- Concerto for Trombone and Orchestra, 1983
- Symphony No. 4 for orchestra, 1998

Concertante

- Sinfonia Concertante (Symphonie No. 3) for violin, cello, double bass and strings, 1986
- Konzertmusik (Concert Music) for violin, viola and chamber ensemble, 1992

Chamber music

- Violasonata for viola and live electronics, 1970
- Glädjebud (Good Tidings) for trumpet, violin and viola, 1971
- An Arty-and-crafty Lilt for alto, viola (or cello) and piano, 1976
- Diptychon for viola and organ, 1979
- Partite for viola and piano, 1991
- Claris for clarinet, viola and piano, 1994
- Confabulation for flute, viola and guitar, 1997
