= Dimitri Terzakis =

Greek composer (born 1938)

Dimitris Terzakis (Greek: Δημήτρης Τερζάκης; born March 12, 1938) is a Greek composer. His father was the author Angelos Terzakis.

== Biography ==
Terzakis was born on March 12, 1938 in Athens. From 1959 to 1964, Terzakis studied composition with Yannis Papaioannou at the Athens Hellenic Conservatory, followed by five years spent at the Hochschule für Musik in Cologne, Germany where he studied composition with Bernd Alois Zimmermann and electronic music with Herbert Eimert. Works by Terzakis have been performed at the International Society for Contemporary Music Festival in Basel (1970), the Darmstadt Artists' Colony summer courses (1970) and the Hamburg Das Neue Werk series (1972). He taught counterpoint and fugue (1974–94) and Byzantine music and composition (1989–94) at the Musikhochschule, Düsseldorf. In 1980, he began to organize summer courses in Western and south-eastern European music in Nafplion. In 1985–6 he was guest professor of composition at the Hochschule für Musik Hanns Eisler. From 1994 to his retirement, he held the chair for composition at the Leipzig Felix Mendelssohn College of Music and Theatre.

He has been a German citizen since 1985 and is living and composing in Leipzig, Germany, and Nafplion, Greece.

== Compositions ==
As a composer, Terzakis' music began with an expanded tonality (Prelude (1961) and Legend (1964)) moving to 12-note serialism (e.g. the Sinfonietta (1965)) and then to a fruitful exploration of micro-intervals and glissandi, principally in his melody, based on Byzantine music. In recent years, Terzakis's view of Western harmony, polyphony and the tempered system as constituting only an extended episode in the evolution of music has increasingly led him to an essentially monophonic output. In this he has drawn example from Greek traditional music, as well as from other parts of the Mediterranean and the Near East.

Terzakis has written numerous symphonic works, chamber music pieces, vocal art songs, and choral pieces such as Kassandra after Aischylos for the ensemble amarcord. He has also written three operas: Circus Universal (1975), Thomas Torquemada (1976), and Hermes (1984).

== Sources ==
- George Leotsakos. The New Grove Dictionary of Opera, edited by Stanley Sadie (1992). ISBN 0-333-73432-7 and ISBN 1-56159-228-5
