= Jean-Yves Fourmeau =

French musician

Jean-Yves Fourmeau is a French classical saxophonist and is the classical music professor at the CRR de Cergy-Pontoise.

== Biography ==
At age 17, Fourmeau won first prize at the Paris Conservatoire in the 3rd cycle of chamber music, which was unprecedented at the time. He maintains an active solo career and has performed with many orchestras across the world. He is currently the saxophone soloist for the Berlin Philharmonic and Radio France. In 1979 he formed a saxophone quartet that bears his name and is the soprano saxophonist in it. Fourmeau has been a consultant for Yamaha since 1986. He has recorded a total of 14 CDs during his career.

== Discography ==
Saxophone and Piano

- Musique d'ici et d'ailleurs, Works of Marais, Granados, Dubois, Itturalde, Piazzola, Bernstein, Benson, Grieg
- Sérénade, Works of Creston, Pascal, Constant, Boutry, Sancan, Bedard
- Les Tableaux de Provence, Works of Desenclos, Dubois, Charpentier, Berio, Boutry, Maurice, Damase
- Rendez-vous, Works of Debussy, Decruck, Franck

Saxophone and Orchestra

- Musical Feeling, with National Police Band Orchestra.
- Claude Debussy, with National Orchestra of Lyon
- Saxophone et Orchestre à cordes de la Garde Républicaine, with the Republican Guard Orchestra

Saxophone Quartet

- Fresque, works of J. Naulais
- Live in Matsumoto, Works of Bach, Vivaldi, Pierne, Piazzolla
- Quatuor de saxophones Jean-Yves Fourmeau, Works of Feld, Margoni, Tisne, Migot
- French Masterpieces, Works of BOZZA, DESENCLOS, PIERNE, DUBOIS, RIVIER, FRANCAIX
- The Art, Works of Bach, Barber, Vivaldi, Piazzola, Rota, Waignien, Luypaerts, Hamel, Brubeck
- Le quatuor de saxophones Jean-Yves Fourmeau en récital, Works of Haendel, Singelee, Mozart, Mendelssohn, Vivaldi, Rossini, Sciortino, Allessandrini, Petit, Lochu, Joplin
- Cinesax, Works of Lalo Schifrin, Henri Mancini, Nino Rota, Georges Delerue, Vladimir Cosma, Jean-Claude Petit, Michel Legrand, Raymond Alessandrini, Léonard Bernstein
- Le Bal, Works of Thierry Escaish; exhibition pictures of Modest Moussorgsky; three penny opera of Kurt Weill.
