= Ramschied =

- Stadtteil of Bad Schwalbach
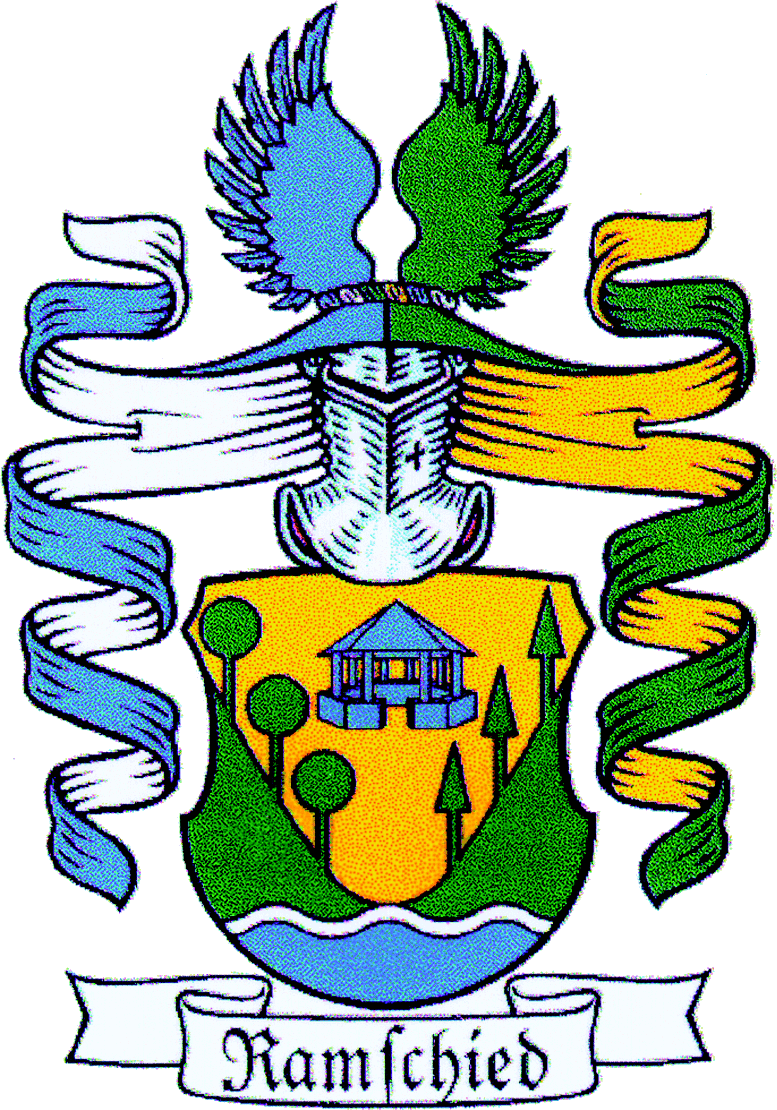
- Coat of arms
- Interactive map of Ramschied
- Location within Germany Location within Hesse
- Coordinates: 50°08′N 08°02′E
- Country: Germany
- State: Hesse
- Admin. region: Darmstadt
- District: Rheingau-Taunus-Kreis
- Town: Bad Schwalbach
- Elevation: 371 m (1,217 ft)

Population
  - Total: 800
- Time zone: UTC+01:00 (CET)
  - Summer (DST): UTC+02:00 (CEST)
- Postal codes: 65307
- Dialling codes: 06124
- Vehicle registration: RÜD
- Website: ramschied.de

The village of Ramschied is a district of the town of Bad Schwalbach in the Rheingau-Taunus-Kreis region of the state of Hessen, Germany. It is also referred to as Bad Schwalbach - Ramschied.

== Location ==
Ramschied is located in the heart of the Taunus Mountains, northwest of Wiesbaden. The aptly named Wisper River, and the forested valley which bears the same name, both begin in Ramschied. Ramschied is surrounded by the following towns; Bad Schwalbach to the east, Bärstadt (part of Schlangenbad) to the southeast, Fischbach to the south, Langenseifen to the southwest, Watzelhain (part of Heidenrod) to the west, Kemel and Heimbach to the north. Many residents of Ramschied commute to destinations as close as a brief stroll and as far away as Frankfurt. Some of the commuters include Americans from the Wiesbaden Army Airfield.

== History ==
Many remnants of a long and memorable history can be observed in and around Ramschied. During the Roman era, Ramschied constituted part of the frontier of Rome with Germania, called the Limes Germanicus. An ancient piece of graffiti, attributed to a Roman soldier named Justin can be hiked to from Ramschied. A few minutes down the Wisperstrasse there are ruins of the medieval castles Burg Geroldstein and Burg Haneck.

As early as 883, Ramschied was mentioned as belonging to the parish of Bleidenstadt (now part of Taunusstein). Before the Thirty Years' War Ramschied was divided into two separate villages; Oberramschied (Upper Ramschied) and Niederramschied (Lower Ramschied). Historical records also find the area referred to as Rumeschied (around 1195) and Oberrumscheit (in 1400). Around 1380, Ramschied was counted as part of the parish of Bärstadt. Church records show that each of the two villages had their own sets of nobles, resulting in the peasants paying higher taxes to the landlords. Such a crushing obligation on a relatively barren and infertile land resulted in bitter poverty. Records show that by 1200, Werner II of Bolanden, a Count of Katzenelnbogen, was receiving income from Ramschied. In 1400 and 1427, the lords of Gerolstein-Oberramscheid established manor courts for their fiefdom. Since 1404, Ramschied was included in enfeoffment to the Greiffenclau zu Volrads noble family of Nassau-Dillenburg. After the destruction of the Thirty Years' War in the 1600s, Ramschied was rebuilt on its present site. Since 31 December 1971, Ramschied is affiliated with the town of Bad Schwalbach.

Historical Population Statistics:

1587: 8 Households, 1809: 142 inhabitants, 1827: 155, 1846: 187, 1871: 176, 1895: 199, 1939: 171, 1961: 211, 1970: 299, 2000: 520

Historical Government Affiliation:

1530: Lower Hessian county office Hohenstein

1806-1813: First French Empire, Lower Katzenelnbogen

1816: Duchy of Nassau, Langenschwalbach Office

1849: Duchy of Nassau, Wiesbaden district

1867: Prussian province of Hesse-Nassau, Wiesbaden region, Untertaunuskreis

1945: Hesse, Wiesbaden region, Untertaunuskreis

1968: Hesse, Darmstadt region, Untertaunuskreis

1977: Hesse, Rheingau-Taunus-Kreis

== Activities ==
Ramschied is a community that won the nationwide "Most Beautiful Town" Award in 1985. Part of the attractiveness of the village comes from the rolling hills, mountaintop views, classic pasture lands, forest trails, abundant farms, a natural mineral spring (which is located at the end of Sebastian Kneipp Strasse and highlighted in the village crest), and a natural Kneipp hydrotherapy pool. Tourists from far and wide visit the village for the day, or a longer stay. Licensed hunters have ample game and anglers can drive a couple of minutes down to the Wispersee, which is a lake stocked with fish. Once the snow covers the steep fields, winter sport activities like sledding, snowboarding and skiing are enjoyed.

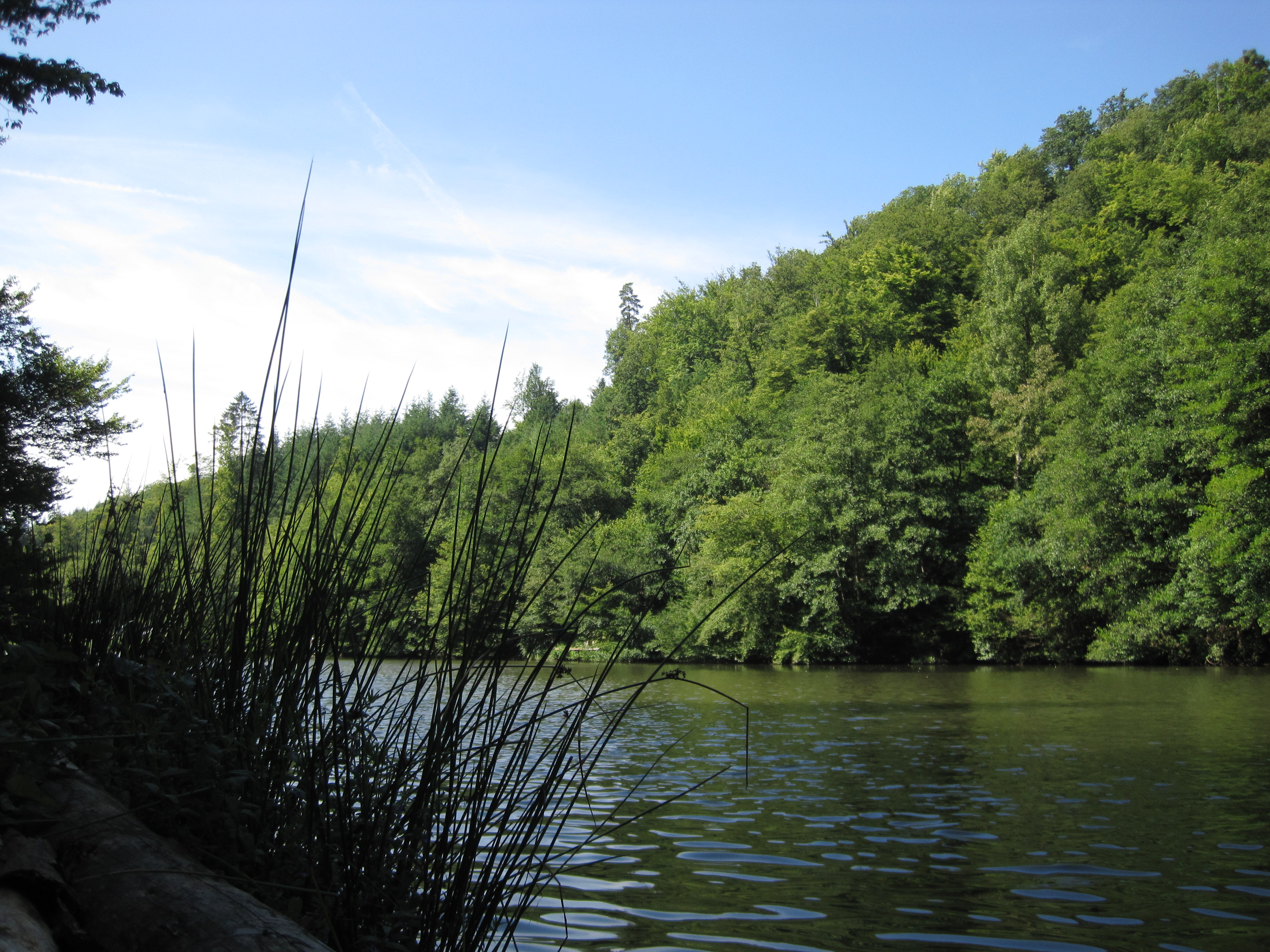
The Wispersee (Wisper Lake), a few minutes from Ramschied
