= Daniel Deffayet =

French classical saxophonist

Daniel Deffayet (May 23, 1922 – December 27, 2002) was a French classical saxophonist. He was the professor of saxophone at the Conservatoire de Paris where he succeeded Marcel Mule after Mule's retirement in 1968. He held this position until 1988.

== Biography ==
Daniel Deffayet started studying music at the age of seven, and later entered the Paris conservatory where he studied the saxophone with Marcel Mule.

He became professor and worked with chamber orchestras under the direction (i.a.) of Bernstein, Boulez, Cluytens, Doráti, Fricsay, Karajan, Kubelík, Leinsdorf, Maazel, Markevitch, Martinon, Monteux, Munch, Ozawa, Paray et Villa-Lobos.

In 1953 he established his quartet.

He recorded several times with Herbert Von Karajan and the Berlin Philharmonic.

== Recordings ==
- Ibert: Concertino da camera (Epic)
- Woodwind Music: Gallois-Montbrun, Glazunov (Musical Heritage Society)
- Rivier: Double Concerto (RTF-Barclay)
- Debussy: Rapsodie (ERATO)
- Daniel Deffayet, Alto Saxophone: Boutry, Gallois-Montbrun, Rueff (Crest)
- Georges Bizet: L'Arlesienne Suites 1 & 2 (Deutsche Grammophon)
- Works by Pierre Max Dubois, Challan, Planel (EMI)
- Le Quatuor de Saxophones Deffayet Rueff, Tisné, Pascal (CBS Sony)
- Quatuors de Saxophones: Desenclos, Pierné, Rivier, Schmitt (EMI)
- L' Art suprême du Quatuor de Saxophones (CBS/Sony)
- Piéces Classiques, Célébres: arr. by Marcel Mule (London)
- Le Quatuor de Saxophones Deffayet: Glazunov, Feld, Schmitt (Crest)
