= Marcel Mule =

French classical saxophonist

- Born: 24 June 1901; Aube, Orne, Normandy, France
- Died: 18 December 2001 (aged 100); Hyères
- Occupation: Saxophonist
- Years active: 1920s–1967

Marcel Mule (24 June 1901 – 18 December 2001) was a French classical saxophonist. He was known worldwide as one of the greatest classical saxophonists ever, and many pieces were written for him, premiered by him, and arranged by him. Many of these pieces have become staples in the classical saxophone repertoire. He is considered to be the founder of the French Saxophone School and the most representative saxophone soloist of his time, being a fundamental figure in the development of the instrument.

== Early life ==
Marcel Mule was born in a village in Aube, France, to a father who learned to play the saxophone while doing his military service and who became director of the brass band of Beaumont-le-Roger. In a time when Paris lacked saxophone teachers, having contact with brass bands was the only way to learn to play the saxophone. His father introduced him to the saxophone at the age of eight, in addition to the violin and piano. He also taught him to play with a "straight" tone (no vibrato), which was the custom of the day.

Though Marcel exhibited the talent necessary to pursue a musical career, at a time when a musician's life was not easy, Mule's father recommended that he choose a teaching career instead. Thus, he enrolled in the École Normale in Évreux and received his diploma after three years. He taught for only six months in a school in town before he was called up for military service.

== In the Garde républicaine ==
The First World War brought Mule to Paris to serve with the Fifth Infantry. It was there that he returned to music, playing in the regiment's military band in 1921. It was also during his time in Paris that he continued his music studies in harmony, piano and violin.

It was not until he concluded his military service that Mule's musical career took off. In 1923, he completed an exam to become a member of the Garde républicaine's band, La Musique de la Garde Républicaine. It provided a regular income for him. He became known for his beautiful sound, and became the saxophone soloist in the Garde, which lead him to be asked to play in concerts with orchestras and also in the orchestra of the Opéra-Comique (although almost exclusively for Massenet's Werther, as this was the only opera in the repertoire that called for an orchestral saxophone). As Mule admits, in that time people liked his sound, though he played as other people did at that time, with a straight interiorised sound. It was during this period that he played frequently with modern dance bands, and where his exposure to American jazz bands, with their treatment of vibrato, inspired him to experiment with and develop his trademark classical saxophone vibrato.

In 1927, Mule formed a saxophone quartet along with members of the Garde, under the name of Quatuor de la Garde Républicaine. In its earliest stage (it was to last for some 40 years), there was no music for such groups. Mule transcribed the music of classical composers such as Albéniz (Sevilla from the Suite española, Op. 47) and Mozart. His ensemble achieved critical acclaim early on. As a consequence, composers of the day, including Gabriel Pierné, Florent Schmitt and Alexander Glazunov, contributed their own works to the repertoire for the instrument group. This influx of new material proved essential for the establishment of the saxophone quartet as a viable ensemble type.

== The golden age ==
In 1936, facing concerts abroad, Mule left the Garde and dedicated himself to performing and composing. The quartet changed its name to Quatuor de Saxophones de Paris, but later became referred to as simply the Quatuor Marcel Mule. The ensemble was heard in concerts and recitals throughout France, Belgium, Holland, England, Switzerland, Germany, Italy and North Africa. It was a period of intense effort, which enabled him to reveal the true nobility and musical potential of the saxophone.

In 1944, Claude Delvincourt, director of the Paris Conservatoire, allowed for the reestablishment of a saxophone class, an offering which had been abandoned with the departure of Adolphe Sax in 1870. Delvincourt entrusted the post to Marcel Mule, who was by then 43 years of age and highly respected in France and abroad. During his years at the Conservatoire, Mule taught over 300 students, many of whom went on to become famous saxophone performers and teachers in their own right.

In 1958, Mule's career culminated as he embarked on a twelve concert tour of the United States with the Boston Symphony Orchestra under the direction of Charles Münch. His programme choice for the tour was Jacques Ibert's Concertino da Camera for alto saxophone, and Henri Tomasi's Ballade.

Writing about Mule's tour with the Boston Symphony Orchestra, New York journalist Louis Leopold Biancolli (1907–1992) called Mule the "Rubinstein of the saxophone". A few years earlier, a French journalist had dubbed Mule as the "Paganini of the saxophone". In 1939, Alfred Frankenstein (1906–1981), music critic for the San Francisco Chronicle wrote, "Marcel Mule is the Jascha Heifetz of the saxophone".

== As a teacher ==
According to Mule, the quality of sound depends on four conditions:

- A firm but light embouchure
- The precision and quality of emission
- The mastery of breathing, necessary for the maintenance of the air column
- The mastery of vibrato, the novelty of which depends on the quality of the expression

Mule's methodic teachings follow these guidelines:

- Breathing: the breath must be relaxed and through the mouth, using the diaphragm. This will allow the player to have a more confident and serene attitude when performing.
- The embouchure: an embouchure subjecting the mouthpiece with the lower lip on top of the lower teeth and the upper teeth. The embouchure must be firm but relaxed. The different registers of the saxophone must be produced with little variations of the oral cavity and throat.
- The tonguing: the tonguing must be produced using the syllable "Da".
- The intonation: the saxophone is not a perfectly tuned instrument; this forces the instrumentalist to develop a very good ear for tuning. To vary the tuning, the player must use the throat and the tongue (positioning the tongue with different vowels), vary the pressure from the lower lip, vary the air pressure, and use corrective fingerings.
- The vibrato: Mule had a clear idea from the beginning how the vibrato should be done, giving clear exercises and the right speed. The right speed is at 300 undulations per minute (i.e., five per second), which gives four undulations per crotchet (quarter note) at M.M. 80. The vibrato is accomplished with a movement of the jaw, which creates a variation of the pressure of the lower lip on the reed.
- Technique, based on scales and arpeggios, including articulation.

All these methods are widely explained in his books. Mule gave to the saxophone history a very extensive amount of teaching material, incomparable to anything that existed previously.

== Study books produced by Mule ==
The books produced by Marcel Mule focused on the points mentioned above: technique (scales, arpeggios), articulation and tone production. Some of the study books created by Marcel Mule are:

- 24 Easy Studies for All Saxophones after A. Samie, Leduc. Alphonse Leduc, 1946, SS, 19 pages. Based on works by the French violinist A. Samie, and suitable for second and third year students with keys ranging to 3 sharps and 3 flats.
- 30 Great Exercises or Studies (Trente Grands Exercices ou Études) for All Saxophones after Soussmann Book 1 and 2 by Marcel Mule. Alphonse Leduc, 1944, SS, 31 pages. These advanced pieces based on studies by the flautist Henri Soussmann are more exercises than etudes (many feature short phrases repeating through the range of the instruments and in different keys). Book 1 has 15 exercises starting in C and moving through the circle of fifths in major and minor sharp keys.
- 48 Studies by Ferling for All Saxophones by Marcel Mule. Alphonse Leduc, 1946, SS, 30 pages. In addition to editing the 48 studies by Franz Wilhelm Ferling for oboe, Professor Mule has written an additional 12 studies in major and minor keys. (Ferling did not include the enharmonic keys of C flat major, A flat minor, etc. in his work.)
- 53 Studies for All Saxophones Book 1, 2 and 3 by Marcel Mule. Alphonse Leduc, SS, 1946, 27 pages. After Theobald Boehm, Adolf Terschak and Anton Bernhard Fürstenau.
- Daily Exercises (Exercices Journaliers) for All Saxophones after Terschak by Marcel Mule. Alphonse Leduc, 1944, SS, 37 pages. Twenty-six technical exercises based on the works of the flautist Adolf Terschak for better intermediate and advanced students. Keys range from 7 sharps to 5 flats.
- Scales and Arpeggios, Fundamental Exercises for the Saxophone Book 1, 2 and 3 by Marcel Mule. Alphonse Leduc, SS, 1948, 30 pages. This book includes scales, scales in thirds, arpeggios, arpeggios on the dominant seventh chord in all major and minor keys. Instructions are in French, English, German, Spanish and Japanese.
- Varied Studies (Études Variées) in All Keys adapted by Marcel Mule. Alphonse Leduc, 1950, SS, 31 pages. Thirty etudes by various composers (Jakob Dont, Rodolphe Kreutzer, Jacques Mazas, Niccolò Paganini, Pierre Rode, etc.) at the advanced intermediate level.
- 18 Exercices ou Études d'après Berbiguier, by M. Mule, Leduc (based on studies by the French flautist Benoit Tranquille Berbiguier)
- Pièces Célèbres Volume 1, 2 and 3, by M. Mule, Leduc
- Tablature de la gamme chromatique, by M. Mule, Leduc

== Retirement ==
In 1967, Mule retired to a villa near the Mediterranean, with his saxophone, though he never played it again. He said it was time to let the new generations make their way through.

On 24 June 2001, all his many friends and alumni met with him to celebrate his centenary. There were Guy Lacour, who was formerly tenor saxophone in the Quatuor, Michel Nouaux, Jean Ledieu, Jacques Person, Jean-Marie Londeix and others from France, but also from Spain, Canada and the United States. In October 2001, the Faculty of Music of the University of Laval (Canada) paid an enthusiastic homage to the master.

A little over a month after the Laval visit, Mule died in his sleep at the age of 100.

== Legacy ==
Mule is universally recognised as a modern master of the classical saxophone and a spiritual heir to Adolphe Sax. His labours as arranger and transcriber became central to the development of the repertoire for the instrument. His influence attracted the attention of some of the most important composers of the day, including Darius Milhaud, Arthur Honegger and Florent Schmitt, whose new works consequently included the saxophone among their forces. Many of the most important figures in classical saxophone history have been Mule's disciples, including Frederick Hemke, Jean-Marie Londeix, Eugene Rousseau, Daniel Deffayet (who succeeded Mule at the Paris Conservatoire in 1968) and Claude Delangle (who succeeded Deffayet in 1988).

== Recordings ==
Mule made many recordings over the course of his career, mostly on 78 RPM and 33 RPM records. Notable ones include:

- His LP issued in the 1930s ("Marcel Mule – 'Le Patron' of the Saxophone") on the Clarinet Classics label, numbered CCOO13, which aroused worldwide interest in the art of classical saxophone.
- His rendition of Jacques Ibert's Concertino da camera, recorded in 1947.

== Books about Marcel Mule ==
- Eugene Rousseau, Marcel Mule, his life and the saxophone, Shell Lake, Wisconsin, 1982, http://www.eugene-rousseau.com
- Jean-Pierre Thiollet, Sax, Mule & Co, H & D, Paris, 2004 ISBN 2-914266-03-0
