= Aube, Orne =

Aube
- Commune
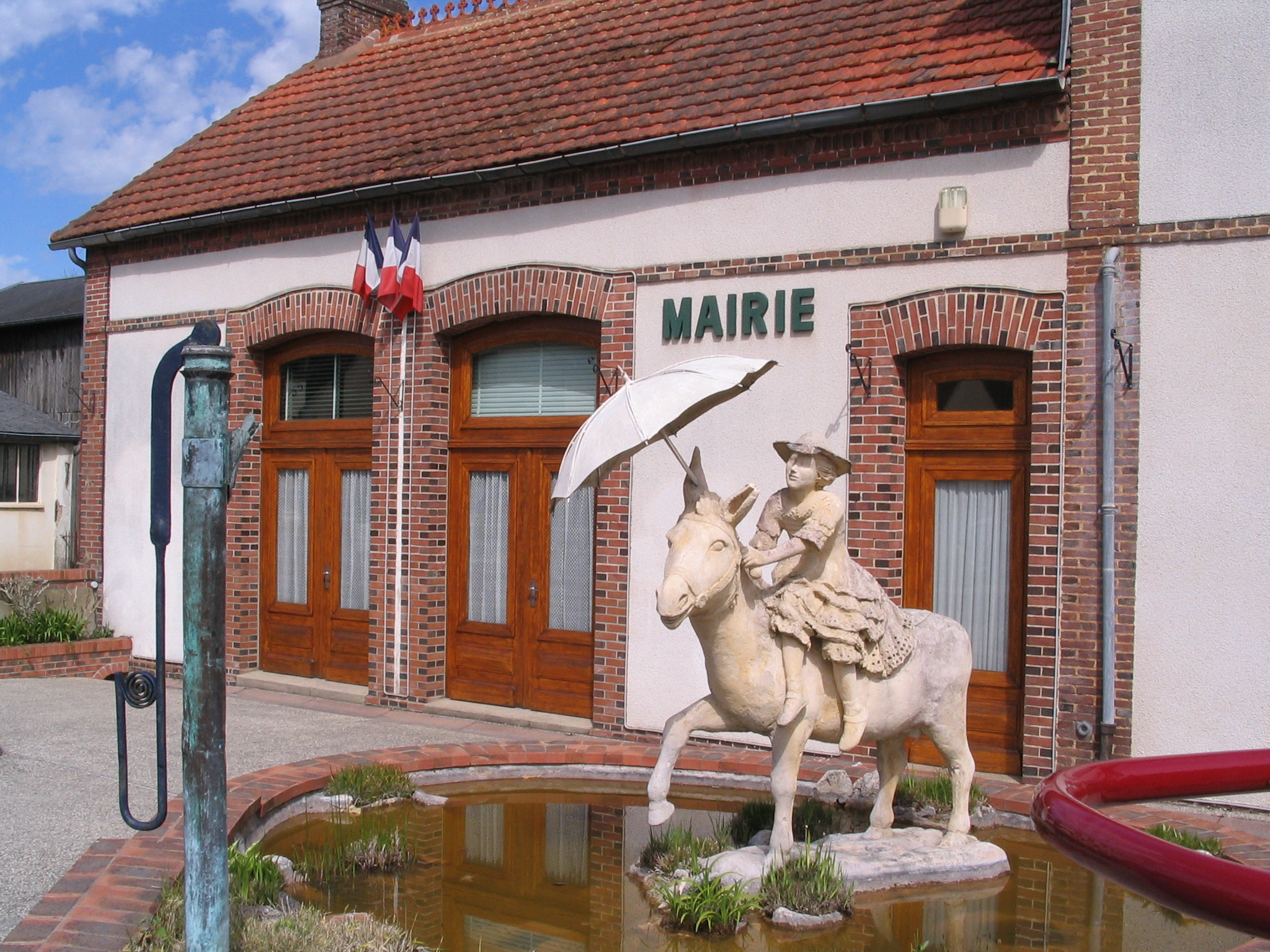
- Town hall

- Coat of arms
- Location of Aube
- Location within France Location within Normandy
- Coordinates: 48°44′26″N 0°32′52″E
- Country: France
- Region: Normandy
- Department: Orne
- Arrondissement: Mortagne-au-Perche
- Canton: Rai
- Intercommunality: CC Pays de L'Aigle

Government
  - Mayor (2020–2026): Véronique Helleux
- Area^{1}: 5.74 km^{2} (2.22 sq mi)
- Elevation: 214 m (702 ft)
- Highest elevation: 267 m (876 ft)
- Lowest elevation: 210 m (690 ft)
- Population (2023): 1,254
  - Density: 218/km^{2} (566/sq mi)
- Time zone: UTC+01:00 (CET)
  - Summer (DST): UTC+02:00 (CEST)
- INSEE/Postal code: 61008 /61270
- ^{1} French Land Register data, which excludes lakes, ponds, glaciers > 1 km^{2} (0.386 sq mi or 247 acres) and river estuaries.

Aube (French pronunciation: [ob]) is a commune in the Orne department in the Normandy region in northwestern France.

== Geography ==
The commune is made up of the following collection of villages and hamlets, Aube, Le Sapin, La Fenderie, Les Nouettes, Le Mesnil and Le Plessis.

Two rivers the Risle and the L'Aubette flow through the commune in addition to a stream the Ruisseau des Vallees.

== Population ==
Historical population
Year	Pop.	±% p.a.
1968	1,296	—
1975	1,503	+2.14%
1982	1,757	+2.26%
1990	1,681	−0.55%
1999	1,540	−0.97%
2007	1,444	−0.80%
2012	1,358	−1.22%
2017	1,298	−0.90%
2023	1,254	−0.57%
Source: INSEE

The inhabitants are known as Albins in French.

== Points of Interest ==
- Musée de la Comtesse de Ségur - The museum of The Countess of Ségur is a collection of memories and documents concerning the life and work of the novelist.

=== National heritage sites ===
- Old forge site of the communes iron works since 1500. The present buildings date back to the 18th Century and were listed as a Monument historique in 1982. The old forge is now a museum dedicated to showing metallurgy.

== Notable people ==
- Serge Rousseau - (1930 – 2007) a French film and television actor and agent was born here.
- Marcel Mule - (1901 – 2001) a French classical saxophonist was born here.

== Twin towns – sister cities ==
Aube is twinned with:

- Hohenstein Strinz-Margaretha, Germany

== See also ==
- Communes of the Orne department
