= Edmund Heusinger von Waldegg =

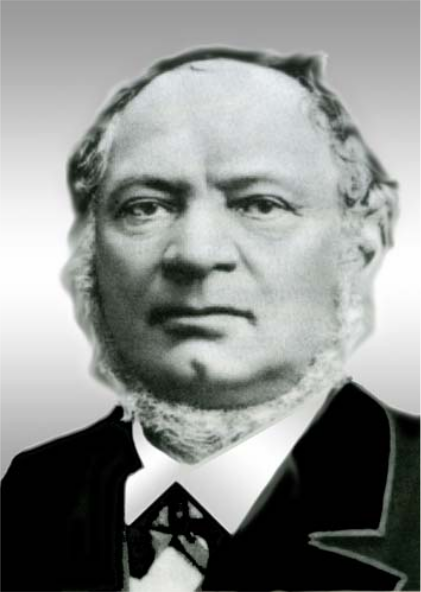
Edmund Heusinger von Waldegg

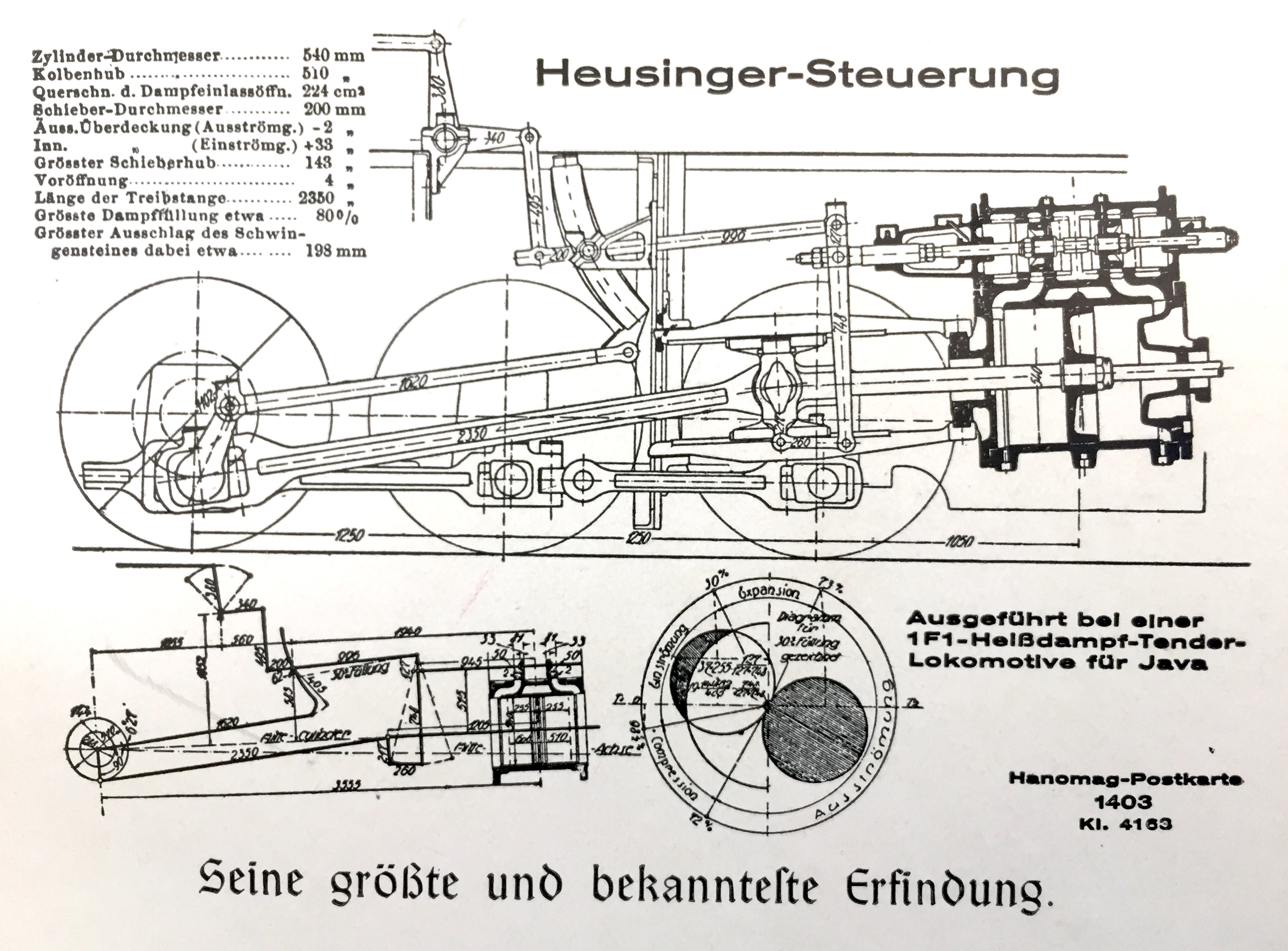

Edmund Heusinger von Waldegg (12 May 1817 – 2 February 1886) was a German mechanical engineer and railway engineer.

Edmund Heusinger was born in Langenschwalbach (present day Bad Schwalbach) in the state of Hesse in central Germany on 12 May 1817. In 1841 he became a master-workman with the Taunus Railway (Taunusbahn). In 1854 he was awarded a contract to build the Homburg Railway. He invented inter alia a new type of valve gear for steam locomotives that was to become the most widely used valve gear in the world. Because the Belgian, Egide Walschaerts, invented the same system independently, it is usually called the Walschaerts valve gear outside the German-speaking world.

Edmund Heusinger von Waldegg died on 2 February 1886 in Hanover, in northern Germany.

== Career ==
Edmund Heusinger von Waldegg, was a mechanical engineer who became famous as a result of his inventions. After studying at University of Göttingen and Leipzig University, he entered the smelting house of “Good Hope", under English management, in 1840, where the first locomotive in Germany was being built. After a short time, he became foreman of the workshop of the Taunus Railway Company in Castel. In 1844 he became overseer in the shops in Frankfurt am Main, and two years later, he was made superintendent of the General Shops in Castel.

After acquiring, by diligent studies, the knowledge of a railway builder, he was given in 1854 the project of building the line between Frankfurt am Main and Hamburg. In 1863, when he made the plans for the Deister and South Harz Railway, which was constructed shortly thereafter, he moved to Hanover, where he lived to the end of his strenuous but successful life.

Edmund Heusinger Von Waldegg was the inventor of the reversing gear for locomotives which bears his name, the principle of which was used on all large engines throughout the world.

He was also the inventor of the cylinder fly-press and of a writing machine for the blind. Among his many inventions in the line of railway technique he also developed the cast-iron plate wheel, perfected the coupling system and improved passenger coaches on through trains.

Important also was his activity in the literary field. He was the author of several handbooks on railway technique, the publisher of the Calendar for Railway Engineers, as well as a constant contributor to the Magazine for the Advancement of Technical Railway System.

== Life ==
Edmund was the second son of Pastor August Conrad Heusinger von Waldegg, born May 12, 1817, in Langenschwalbach. Notwithstanding his distinguished career as a mechanical engineer his life was not without tragedy. He lost three wives while still young, and his fourth wife and five of his children died before him. He married (1) Amalia Emminghaus, 12 May 1846, who died on 9 February 1847; (2) Charlotte Thomae, 24 April 1848, who died on 17 July 1850; (3) Caroline Thomae, 2 October 1851, who died on 7 February 1859, and (4) Anna Quentin, 29 July 1863, who died 11 April 1880.

Edmund was the father of nine children, but when he died on 2 February 1886, only two daughters, Charlotte Amalia (on 8 February 1847) and Ida (born 3 August 1856), and two sons, Gottlieb (23 May 1866) and Edmund Jr. (born 2 February 1868), survived him.

The will to work, joy in work and creative power were the three motives in the life of Edmund Heusinger von Waldegg, and it is in this spirit that a monument was erected to his memory in Hanover, the dedication of which was held in that city on 22 September 1929, in the presence of a large gathering of friends and representatives of different organisations, as well as of his grandson, Pastor Wolfgang Heusinger von Waldegg, who accepted the monument in the name of the family and thanked all contributors for the honour shown to his grandfather. His portrait, is hanging in the Deutsches Museum in Munich and in the Technical Museum in Vienna.

== Sources ==
- Kirsche, Hans-Joachim (1978). Lexicon der Eisenbahn (5th ed.). transpress.
- Edward W. Heusinger (1945). The Heusinger family in Texas. San Antonio, Texas : [Standard Printing Company].
- Wolfgang Heusinger von Waldegg (1938). Kulturgeschtliche Bilder aus fuenf Jahrhunderten.
