= Guy Lacour =

French composer

(Guillaume) Guy Lacour (8 June 1932 in Soissons, Aisne – 15 May 2013) was a French composer of classical music, and a tenor saxophonist.

== Education ==
Lacour started musical studies at 10 years old in his home city of Soissons. He joined local orchestras and earned his diploma from the Confédération Musicale de France. He then attended the conservatory in Versailles where he studied with Marcel Josse. He entered the Conservatoire National Supérieur de Musique in Paris in 1950 and studied saxophone with Marcel Mule and chamber music with Fernand Oubradous.

== Career ==
After finishing his studies, he became a pop saxophonist and played in four leading groups of that time, performing in leading music halls, cabarets and variety shows (Lido, Moulin-Rouge, Folies Bergère, etc.). He remained a classical saxophonist, however, performing in symphony orchestras in concerts, on the radio, and in the opera. In 1961 he joined the famous Marcel Mule Saxophone Quartet as its tenor saxophonist. This led to concerts and recording sessions with the Berlin Philharmonic under Herbert von Karajan, the Orchestre de Paris under Daniel Barenboim as a soloist. After leaving the Marcel Mule Quartet, he was a member for several years of the Ensemble de Saxophones Français.

His teaching career began in 1975. He taught saxophone in several conservatories around Paris. He became a professor at the Ecole Nationale de Musique Edgar Varèse in Gennevilliers, Hauts-de-Seine, France and in the same year was named Director of the Conservatoire Municipal de Mantes-la-Ville, Yvelines, France.

He served on the juries at saxophone performance contests. He was a founding member of the Association des Saxophonistes de France, and was later appointed an "emeritus member". He became a technical consultant and instrument tester for the Selmer saxophone firm in Mantes-la-Ville.

In 1992 he ended all other activities to concentrate on composition. His first composition was back in 1963. Many of his later pieces have become standard repertoire and required pieces at saxophone performance competitions worldwide.

== Compositions ==
- 1972 Hommage to Jacques Ibert (alto saxophone and orchestra)
- 1971 Suite en duo pour 2 Saxophones ou 2 hautbois ou 2 clarinettes (2 saxophones, 2 oboes, or 2 clarinets)
  1. Allegro
  2. Aria
  3. Petite Fugue
  4. Largo puis Scherzetto
- Belle époque
- Chanson Modale (flute and piano)
- Deux SI, Deux La (flute and piano)
- Divertissement (alto saxophone and percussion)
- Double Jeu (soprano saxophone and tenor saxophone duet)
- Juste au cor (French horn and piano)
- Méditation (saxophone ensemble: sopranino ad lib, SSAAATTTBB, bass ad lib)
- Moments partagés (2 clarinets)
- Noctilène
- Pièce Concertante (alto or tenor saxophone and orchestra)
- Quatuor Helios (flute quartet or flute plus string trio)
- Quatuor pour Saxophones (saxophone quartet)
  1. Elegie
  2. Scherzo
  3. Rondo Final
- 2000 "Entrelacs" pour Flute and alto Saxophone (A Marianne HUARD et Daniel GREMELLE)
- 2011 "Dualités" pour Alto Saxophone et Piano (À Kenneth Tse)

== Teaching literature and study material ==
- 2002 28 études-impromptus sur les modes à transpositions limitées d'Olivier Messiaen pour trompette
- 24 Easy Atonal Etudes for saxophone
- 56 Etudes Récréatives pour Saxophone (in 2 volumes)
- 28 Etudes sur les Modes d'Olivier Messiaen for saxophone
- 50 Etudes Faciles & Progressives Cahier 1
- 50 Etudes Faciles & Progressives Cahier 2
- 100 Dèchiffrages Manuscrits
- 12 Esquisses
- 8 études brillantes pour saxophone
- 22 Dodecaprices pour Bassoon
- 22 Dodécaphonies pour Bassoon
