= Hünstetten =

- Municipality
- Coat of arms

- Location of Hünstetten within Rheingau-Taunus-Kreis district
- Interactive map of Hünstetten
- Location within Germany Location within Hesse
- Coordinates: 50°13′N 08°10′E
- Country: Germany
- State: Hesse
- Admin. region: Darmstadt
- District: Rheingau-Taunus-Kreis

Government
  - Mayor (2018–24): Jan Kraus

Area
  - Total: 50.56 km^{2} (19.52 sq mi)
- Elevation: 360 m (1,180 ft)

Population (2025-12-31)
  - Total: 10,416
  - Density: 206.0/km^{2} (533.6/sq mi)
- Time zone: UTC+01:00 (CET)
  - Summer (DST): UTC+02:00 (CEST)
- Postal codes: 65510
- Dialling codes: 06126, 06128, 06438
- Vehicle registration: RÜD, SWA
- Website: www.gemeinde-huenstetten.de

Hünstetten is a municipality in the Rheingau-Taunus-Kreis in the Regierungsbezirk of Darmstadt in Hesse, Germany.

== Neighbouring communities ==
Hünstetten borders in the north on the community of Hünfelden, in the northeast on the town of Bad Camberg (both in Limburg-Weilburg), in the east on the town of Idstein, in the south on the town of Taunusstein and in the west on the communities of Hohenstein and Aarbergen (all in the Rheingau-Taunus-Kreis).

== Constituent communities ==
Hünstetten is made up of the following Ortsteile:

Constituent community	Inhabitants
Bechtheim	937
Beuerbach	1,176
Görsroth	1,248
Kesselbach	778
Ketternschwalbach	489
Limbach	751
Oberlibbach	619
Strinz-Trinitatis	1,026
Wallbach (Taunus)	1,068
Wallrabenstein	2,126

Total: 10,218

The population figures are based on data for 31 December 2007.

== History ==
In the course of municipal reform in Hesse, the community of Hünstetten came into being on 1 January 1972 through the merger of the communities of Beuerbach, Kesselbach, Ketternschwalbach, Limbach, Strinz-Trinitatis and Wallbach. On 1 July 1972, they were joined by Oberlibbach, and then Bechtheim, Görsroth and Wallrabenstein on 1 January 1977, giving Hünstetten its current shape.

== Politics ==
=== Community council ===
The last municipal election was held on 14 March 2021.

Parties and voter communities		2021		2016		2011		2006		2001	
Parties and voter communities		%	Seats	%	Seats	%	Seats	%	Seats	%	Seats
HüLi	Hünstetter Liste – Bürger für Hünstetten	41.7	13	42.5	13	25.3	8	–	–	–	–
SPD	Social Democratic Party of Germany	20.1	6	26.0	8	36.6	11	50.7	14	56.6	17
CDU	Christian Democratic Union of Germany	19.0	6	21.4	7	25.5	8	35.5	10	31.4	10
Greens	Alliance 90/The Greens	15.9	5	10.1	3	12.6	4	10.4	3	9.4	3
FDP	Free Democratic Party	3.3	1	–	–	–	–	3.4	1	2.6	1
	Independent	–	–	–	–	–	–		3	–	–
Total		100.0	31	100.0	31	100.0	31	100.0	31	100.0	31
Voter turnout in %		59.6		58.4		57.2		58.1		59.8	
Source: Municipality of Hünstetten election overview Archived 2021 2016 2011

=== Coat of arms ===

The community’s arms might be described thus: Or a side sinister and dexter and a fess joining them between the fess point and the honour point, the whole gules with the fess between ten dolmens azure, four of which in chief.

The German blazon says that the dolmens (called Doppel-T-Kopfschäfte, although it is explained that they are meant to be dolmens) should be blue, despite their silvery appearance here.

The coat of arms was approved in December 1979 by the State Archive in Darmstadt, and was given its form by Bad Nauheim heraldic artist Heinz Ritt after the community’s guidelines. The ten dolmens symbolize the ten formerly self-administering communities, and the sides (stripes down each side) and the fess (horizontal stripe) form a red uppercase H, the new (in 1972) greater community’s initial letter. The H’s crossbar also stands for the Hühnerstraße (road), which splits the community into four constituent communities on one side and six on the other.

=== Town partnerships ===
- Neukirchen am Großvenediger, Salzburg, Austria since 1976

== Economy and infrastructure ==
The community was once rural, and agriculture still plays a rôle in Hünstetten’s livelihood today. All in all, though, it changed over the latter half of the 20th century into a residential community. There are some 800 jobs in town, meaning that the overwhelming majority of the workforce earns its livelihood outside the community, with the good road links ensuring that this means mainly in the Frankfurt Rhine Main Region.

=== Growth against the trend ===
Hünstetten benefits from the excellent traffic connection and the public infrastructure. Additionally, the cost of construction and property is fairly low, which helps the community to have more than 10,000 residents. The current demographic forecast indicates the highest growth rate for Hünstetten until 2030. An important reason for that development is the high quality of school, public education, and caring institutions for children and teens. To be able to combine both, family and work, is another argument for a lot of young families to live in Hünstetten. The biggest growth in the areas of community and economy development are in Görsroth, Kesselbach and Oberlibbach, which are three of the ten subtowns (Ortsteile) of Hünstetten. In the planning and extension of the community projects, Hünstetten puts main focus and attention on the life quality of the residents. A comfortable life for elder people enables one senior residence and one institution of assisted living. Both institutions are located in Wallbach, one of the ten subtown of Hünstetten where the town hall is also located. Additionally, Hünstetten offers: shopping, doctors, banking, offices and commercial space. Since 2010, all subtowns of Hünstetten are equipped with fiberglass internet. With this step Hünstetten removed a growth barrier.

=== Education ===
The richest community in percentage in the Rheingau-Taunus-Kreis is Hünstetten. It has two kindergartens and three child care center. Also, Hünstetten offers two elementary schools, which are located in Wallrabenstein and Görsroth. Both schools, the "Rabenschule" and the "Panoramaschule", received from the state Hessen the certificate "all day school" - included child care offering. Furthermore, Hünstetten has an integrated school, which combines middle school and high school. Last but not least, Hünstetten has a well-known music school.

=== Transport ===
The community is well linked to the long-distance road network through the Bad Camberg (4 km away) and Idstein (8 km away) interchanges on the A 3. Furthermore, Bundesstraße 417 runs through the greater community. Wiesbaden lies 22 km away, Mainz 26 km and Frankfurt 50 km.

=== Education ===
- IGS Wallrabenstein (integrated comprehensive school) in Wallrabenstein
- Rabenschule (primary school) in Wallrabenstein
- Panoramaschule (primary school) in Görsroth
