= Bad Schwalbach =

- Town
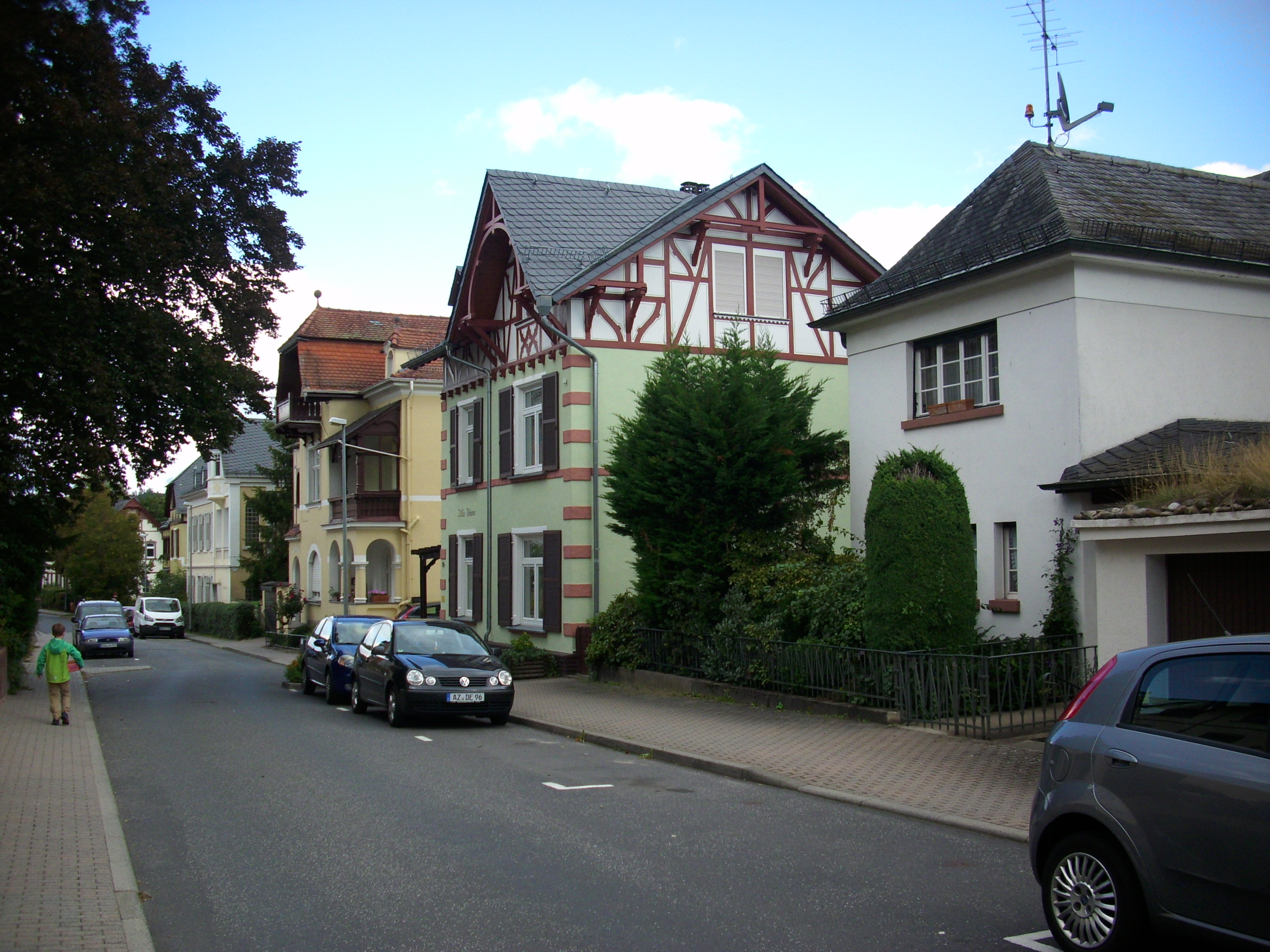
- A residential area in Bad Schwalbach

- Coat of arms

- Location of Bad Schwalbach within Rheingau-Taunus-Kreis district
- Interactive map of Bad Schwalbach
- Location within Germany Location within Hesse
- Coordinates: 50°08′N 08°04′E
- Country: Germany
- State: Hesse
- Admin. region: Darmstadt
- District: Rheingau-Taunus-Kreis
- Subdivisions: 8 districts

Government
  - Mayor (2019–25): Markus Oberndörfer (SPD)

Area
  - Total: 40.27 km^{2} (15.55 sq mi)
- Elevation: 361 m (1,184 ft)

Population (2025-12-31)
  - Total: 11,572
  - Density: 287.4/km^{2} (744.3/sq mi)
- Time zone: UTC+01:00 (CET)
  - Summer (DST): UTC+02:00 (CEST)
- Postal codes: 65307
- Dialling codes: 06124
- Vehicle registration: RÜD, SWA
- Website: www.bad-schwalbach.de

Bad Schwalbach (German pronunciation: [baːt ˈʃvalbax]; called Langenschwalbach until 1927) is the district seat of Rheingau-Taunus-Kreis, in Hesse, Germany.

== Geography ==
=== Geographic location ===
Bad Schwalbach is a spa town some 20 km northwest of Wiesbaden. It lies at 289 to 465 m above sea level in the Taunus, along the small river Aar (Lahn) (a tributary of the Lahn). Over 56 percent of the municipal area is forest.

=== Neighbouring communities ===
Bad Schwalbach borders in the north on the community of Hohenstein, in the east on the town of Taunusstein, in the south on the community of Schlangenbad, and in the west on the community of Heidenrod.

=== Constituent communities ===
Bad Schwalbach’s Stadtteile are Adolfseck, Bad Schwalbach, Fischbach (Bad Schwalbach), Heimbach, Hettenhain, Langenseifen, Lindschied and Ramschied.

== History ==
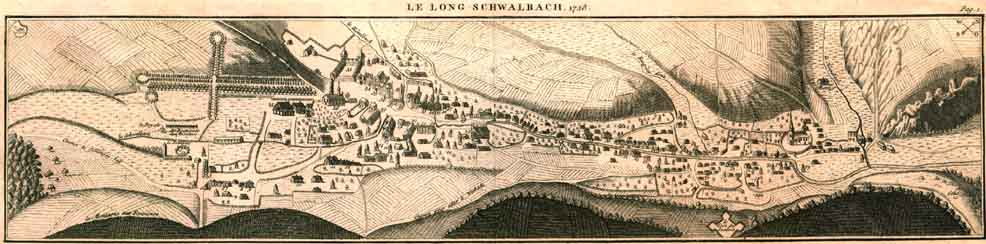
Map of Langenschwalbach in 1728

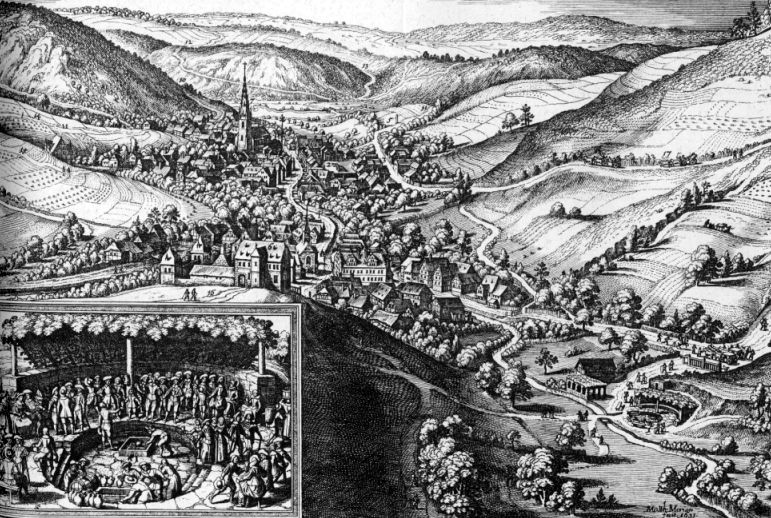
Bad Schwalbach – Extract from Topographia Hassiae by Matthäus Merian the Younger, 1655

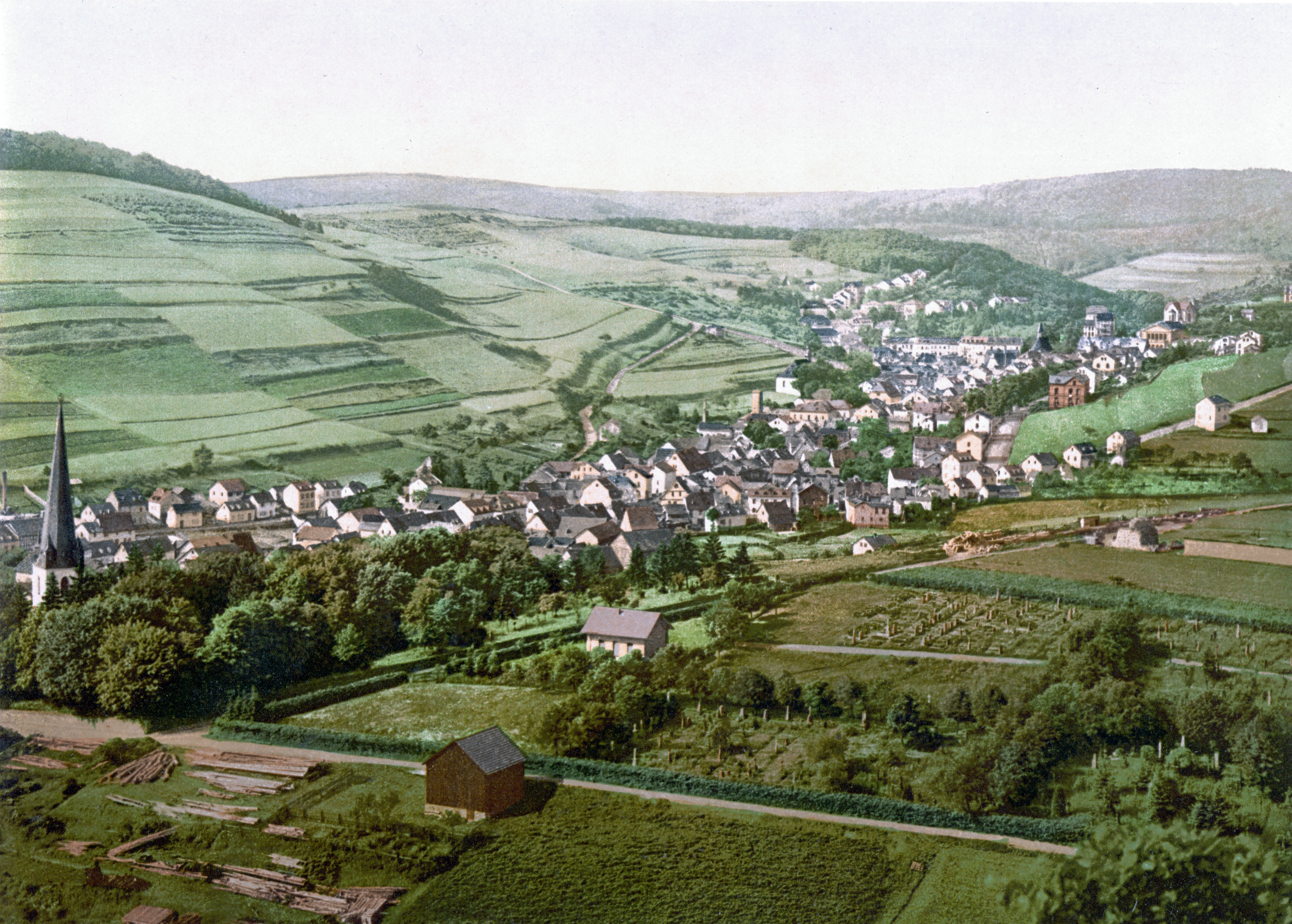
Bad Langenschwalbach about 1900

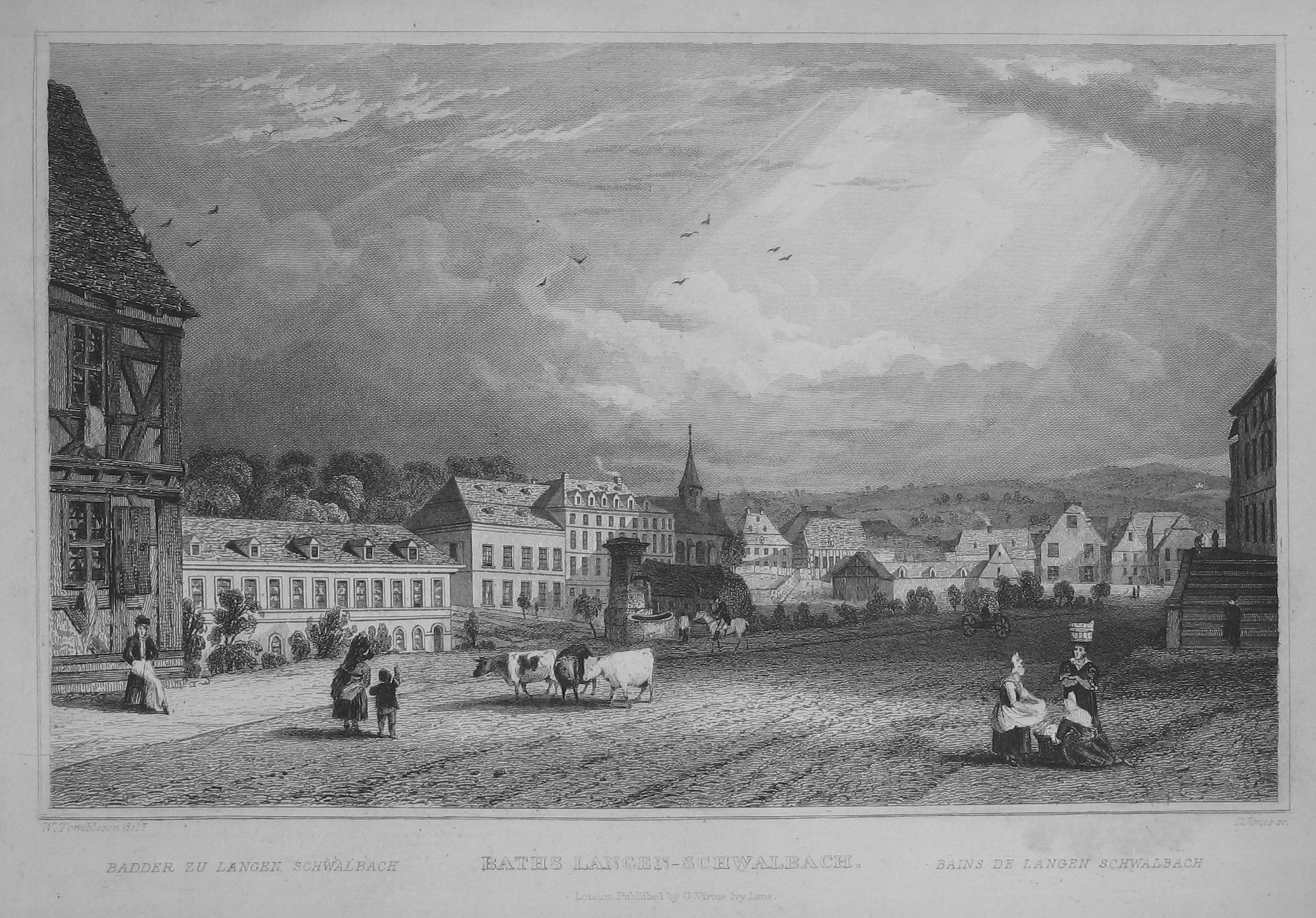
Bad Schwalbach about 1832 in an engraving after Tombleson

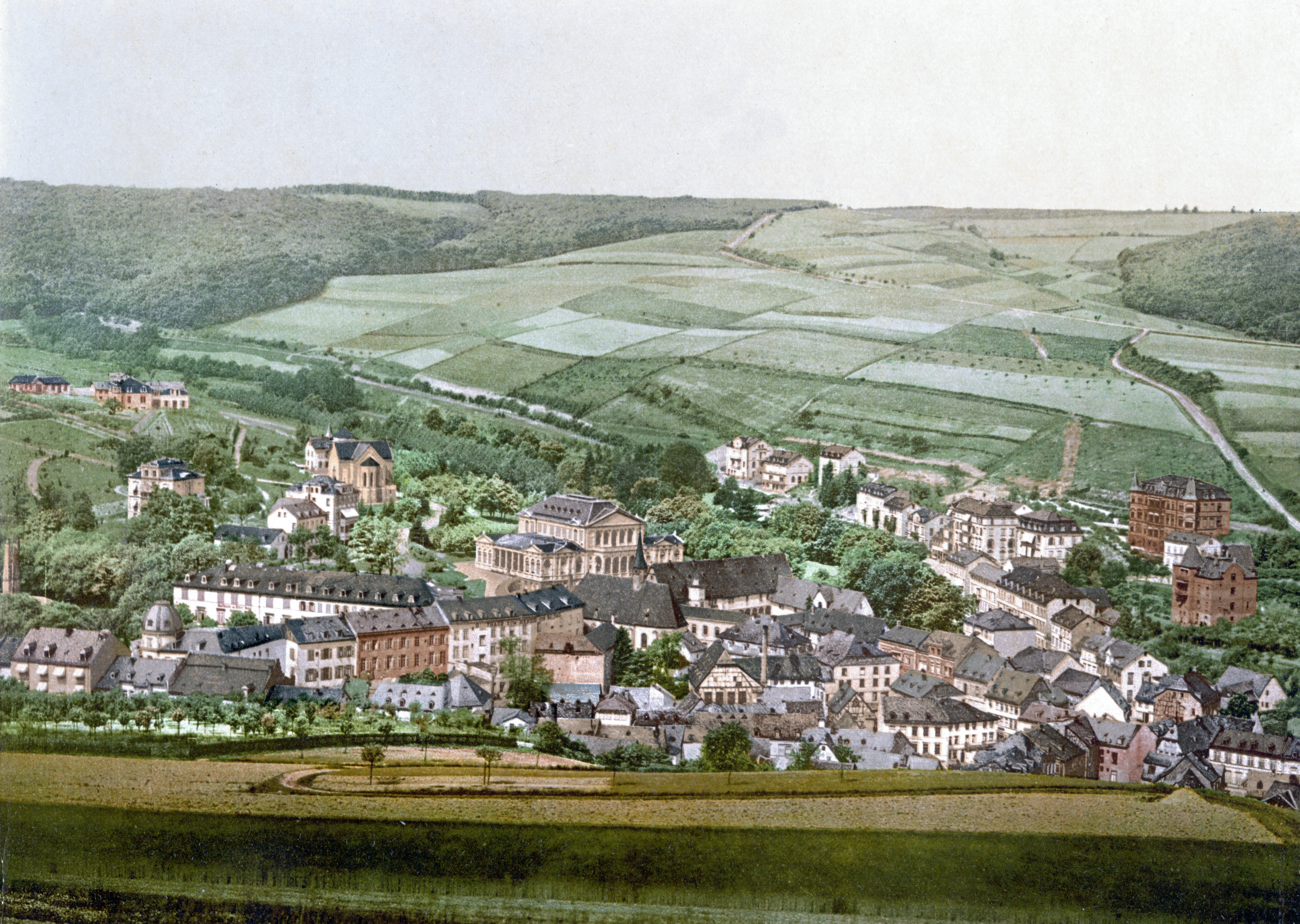
Bad Langenschwalbach about 1900

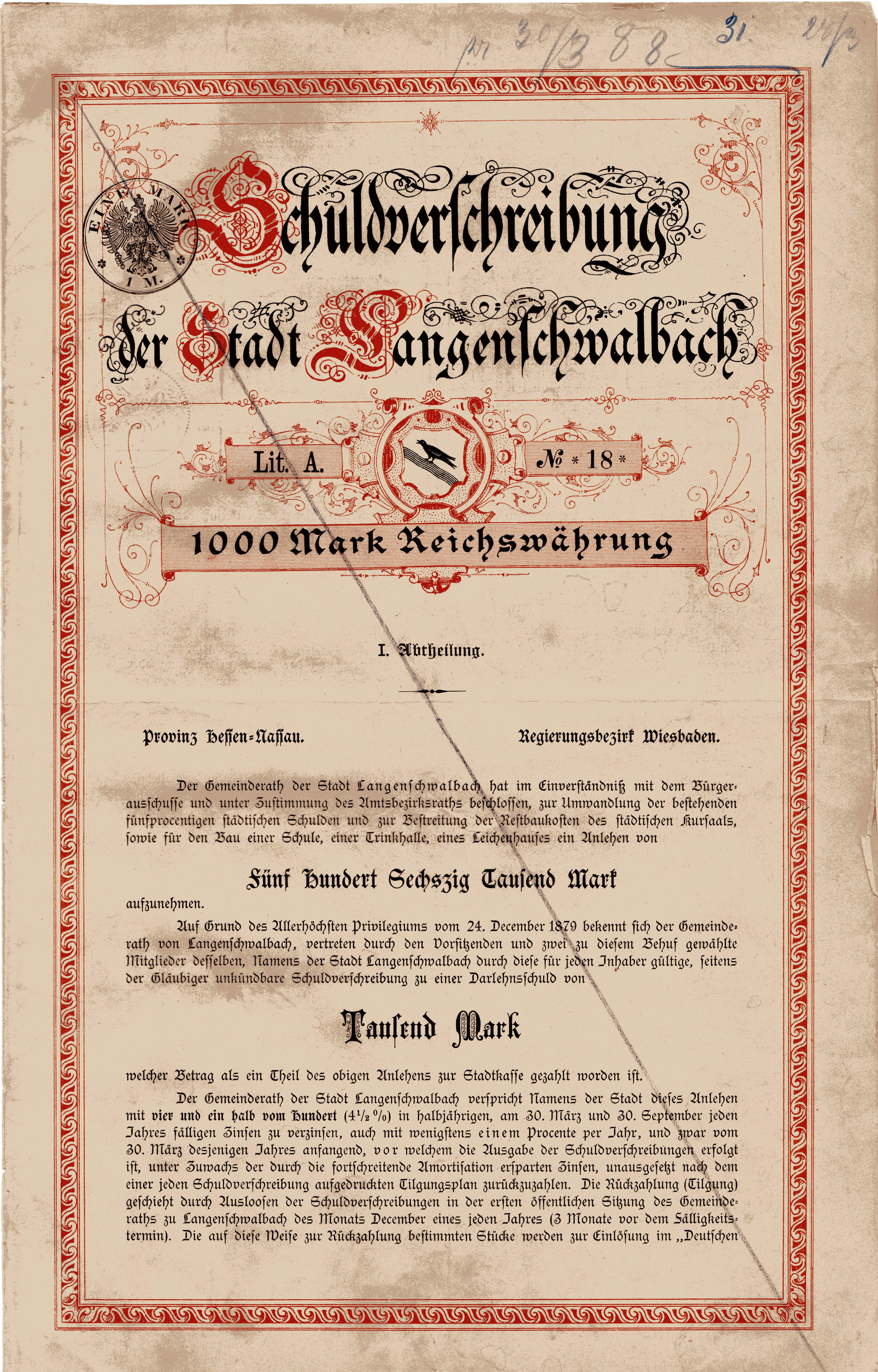
Bond of the City of Langenschwalbach, issued 1 March 1880, for the building of a school, a pump room and a mortuary

Bad Schwalbach was first mentioned in a document in 1352 as Langinswalbach. The first reliable report of the mineral springs came in 1568 from the Worms doctor Tabernaemontanus, who also made the place known in his 1581 work Neuw Wasserschatz (New Water Resources). Although Langenschwalbach was utterly destroyed in the Thirty Years' War, it was quickly rebuilt, and the healing water trade began to blossom. At first, the water would be sold by the jug or barrel throughout Europe by mail order. Only a few seekers of healing undertook the arduous journey to the Taunus.

The health resort started at the beginning of the 19th century only after the improvement of road conditions through construction. The Aartalbahn (railway) from Wiesbaden to Langenschwalbach, finished in 1889, also contributed substantially to its founding. Many crowned heads, princes and counts then came to take the waters and visit the gaming parlours where few strict rules applied. After the end of the First World War, the nobility quickly lost importance and thus began the long, drawn-out and somewhat painful transition from a luxury spa to a public one, which only ended after the Second World War.

In a wood near Bad Schwalbach in late 1800 or early 1801, Katharina Pfeifer is said to have borne the outlaw Schinderhannes (Johannes Bückler) a child.

== Politics ==
=== Town council ===
The municipal election held on 26 March 2006 yielded the following results:

Parties and voter communities		% 2006	Seats; 2006	% 2001	Seats; 2001
CDU	Christian Democratic Union of Germany	34.1	13	33.0	12
SPD	Social Democratic Party of Germany	30.8	11	32.8	12
GREENS	Bündnis 90/Die Grünen	11.1	4	9.3	4
FDP	Free Democratic Party	4.0	1	3.9	1
BSB	Bad Schwalbacher Bürgerblock	15.8	6	11.2	4
FWG	Freie-Wähler-Gemeinschaft	4.1	2	9.8	4
Total		100.0	37	100.0	37
Voter turnout in %		46.6		52.4	

=== Mayors ===
- 1995–2001: Günter Janisch (CDU)
- 2001–2007: Michael Kalhoff (CDU)
- 2007–2019: Martin Hußmann (FDP)
- 2019–incumbent: Markus Oberndörfer (SPD)

== Culture and sightseeing ==
The Kurbahn, which operates on the rails of the former Moortransportbahn in the spa park, provides special access to the town’s and health resort’s history. From April to October, the trains are run by the Bad Schwalbacher Kurbahn Verein e.V. on all Sundays and holidays. From Moorbadehaus Station the line leads to the Moorgruben by way of Golfhaus, Schwalbenbrunnen and Waldsee.

Bad Schwalbach's only museum was reopened in 2002 with new exhibits. Through its exhibits, it attempts to lead visitors through Bad Schwalbach’s history and its life as a health resort. Among other things, the museum includes the pharmacy museum, once displayed in private rooms. The pharmacy museum contains the oldest pharmacy in the Taunus (established in 1642), fully furnished. The museum also houses the town archive.

Also worth seeing are the seven fountains and many temples, among them the Elisabethentempel, which was endowed by Elisabeth of Austria-Hungary (Sissi) while she was staying at the spa in Langenschwalbach.

North of the town is found Alexander’s Rest – so called even in German – a sheltered bench which also serves as a memorial to a British spa visitor who was killed at this spot in a bicycle accident in August 1896 (he is buried at the local cemetery).

== Economy and Infrastructure ==
The largest employer is the Schwälbchen Molkerei Jakob Berz AG (dairy).

=== Transport ===
Bad Schwalbach lies on Bundesstraße 260, also known as the Bäderstraße (“Bath Road”), as well as Bundesstraßen 54 and 275. The nearest Autobahn interchange is on the A 66 15 km away. There is also another interchange 20 km away at Idstein on the A 3.

Bad Schwalbach also lies on the Aartalbahn, but there has been no regular passenger service since 1986, only seasonal railway-museum tours by the Nassauische Touristikbahn. Bad Schwalbach is therefore the only Hessian district seat which is no longer served by rail. There have been efforts to have the line reactivated, yet they have all been unsuccessful so far. This line has been labelled a cultural monument and is Hesse's longest building monument – only the Roman limes, a land monument, is longer.

=== Education ===
- Nikolaus-August-Otto-Schule (comprehensive school, roughly 1500 students)
- Wiedbachschule (primary school)
- Janusz-Korczak-Schule (school for help with learning, special education advisory and promotional centre)
- Internationale Opernakademie (professional school for opera singers)

== Famous people ==
=== Sons and daughters of the town ===
- Polyxena of Hesse-Rotenburg (1706–1735), Queen of Sardinia
- Charles Emmanuel, Landgrave of Hesse-Rotenburg, nephew of the above (1746–1812)
- Edmund Heusinger von Waldegg (1817–1886), railway engineer
- Otto Frickhoeffer (1892-1968) conductor and composer
- Robert Philipp Nöll von der Nahmer (1899–1986), FDP politician
- Reinhard Suhren (1916–1984), frigate captain and U-boat commander in the Second World War
- Jörg Fauser (1944–1987), journalist and writer
- Klaus-Peter Willsch (1961– ), CDU politician
- Erol Bulut (1975– ), former footballer and manager
- Christian Werner (1979– ), competition cyclist

=== People associated with the town ===
- Matthäus Merian the Elder (1593–1650), copper engraver and publisher, died in Bad Schwalbach
- Johann Heinrich Fenner von Fenneberg (1774–1849), balneotherapist
- Philipp Hoffmann (1806–1889), architect and building master
- Adolphus Busch (1839–1913), entrepreneur, died in Lindschied
- Paul Wallot (1841–1912), architect of the Reichstag building, died in Bad Schwalbach
- Friedrich Delitzsch (1850–1922), Assyriologist, also died here
- Julius Lippert (1895–1956) NSdAP Politician, Mayor of Berlin, died in Bad Schwalbach
- Bernhard Bendel (1908–1980), founder of the Catholic organization Opus Spiritus Sancti

The Realschule (Hufeisenschule) in what was then called Langenschwalbach was attended from 1846 to 1848 by Nicolaus Otto (1832–1891), the inventor born in nearby Holzhausen an der Haide who developed the Otto engine.
