= Brita (company) =

German water filter company

Brita SE
- Type: Privately held family business
- Industry: Water filtration
- Founded: 1966; 60 years ago
- Founder: Heinz Hankammer
- Headquarters: Taunusstein, Germany, Taunusstein, Germany (Brita SE) Oakland, CA (Brita LP)
- Area served: Worldwide
- Key people: Markus Hankammer (CEO)
- Products: Water filters
- Brands: Brita (outside of the Americas), Mavea
- Revenue: €664 million (2022)
- Number of employees: 2,242 worldwide (2022)
- Website: www.brita.com

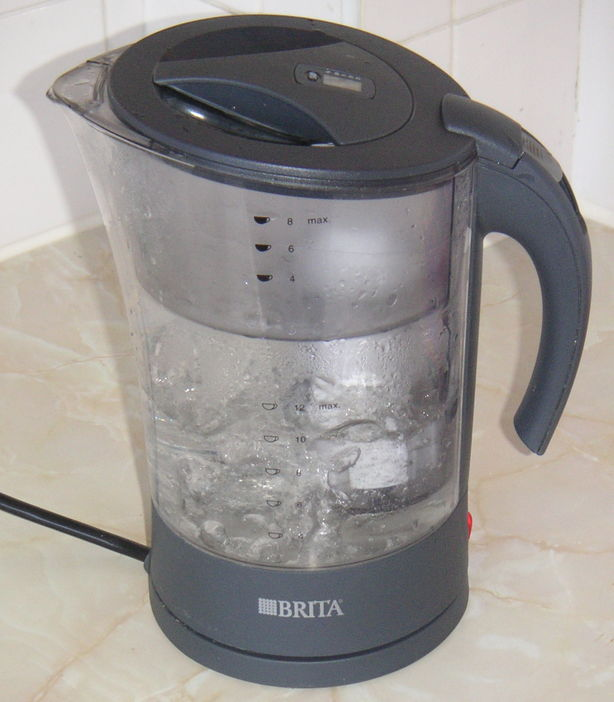
A Brita kettle with boiling water that has passed from the top reservoir through a filter element (white) into the main jug at the bottom.

Brita SE is a German manufacturer of water filters headquartered in Taunusstein near Wiesbaden, Hesse. The company's manufacturing facilities are located in Germany, the United Kingdom, Italy and China. Brita products are distributed in 69 countries.

== Products ==
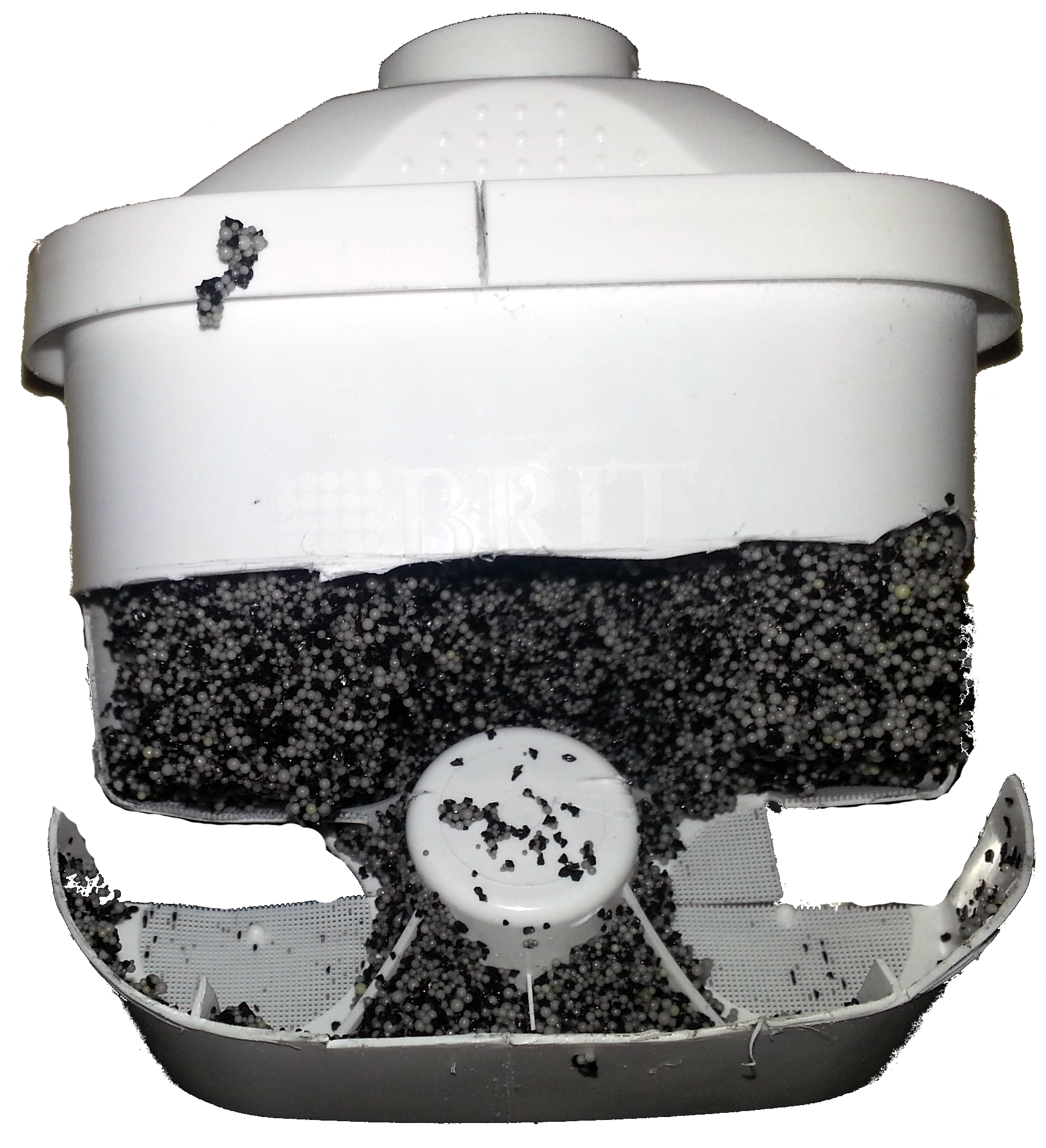
A used Brita ("Maxtra" type) water purification filter cross-section with activated charcoal particles (black) and ion-exchange resin beads (white).

Brita produces water jugs (BPA-free, made of styrene methyl methacrylate copolymer), and tap attachments with integrated disposable filters. The filters can be recycled.

Their primary filtering mechanism consists of activated carbon and ion-exchange resin. The activated carbon is produced from coconut shells. According to Brita, the filters have two effects:

- The activated carbon removes substances that may impair taste, such as chlorine and chlorine compounds.
- The ion-exchange resin reduces the carbonate hardness (limescale) as well as copper and lead.

In the United Kingdom, Hinari and Breville sell electric kettles incorporating Brita technology.

== History ==
Brita was founded in 1966 by Heinz Hankammer. The company was first named AquaDeMat before he later named the company after his daughter. The company secured the first patent for domestic water filter use in the 1970s.

In 1988, The Clorox Company, based in Oakland, California, entered in a licensing-and-distribution agreement with the German company for North and South America. In 1995, it added the Canadian rights by acquiring Canada's Brita International Holdings. In 2000, Clorox acquired the sole rights to the brand in the Americas and Brita agreed to a non-compete clause until 2005. In 2008, Brita returned to the North American market under the brand Mavea, only to withdraw again in 2016. However, products are still sold in the US under the Brita brand.
