= Hohenstein, Hesse =

Hohenstein
- Municipality
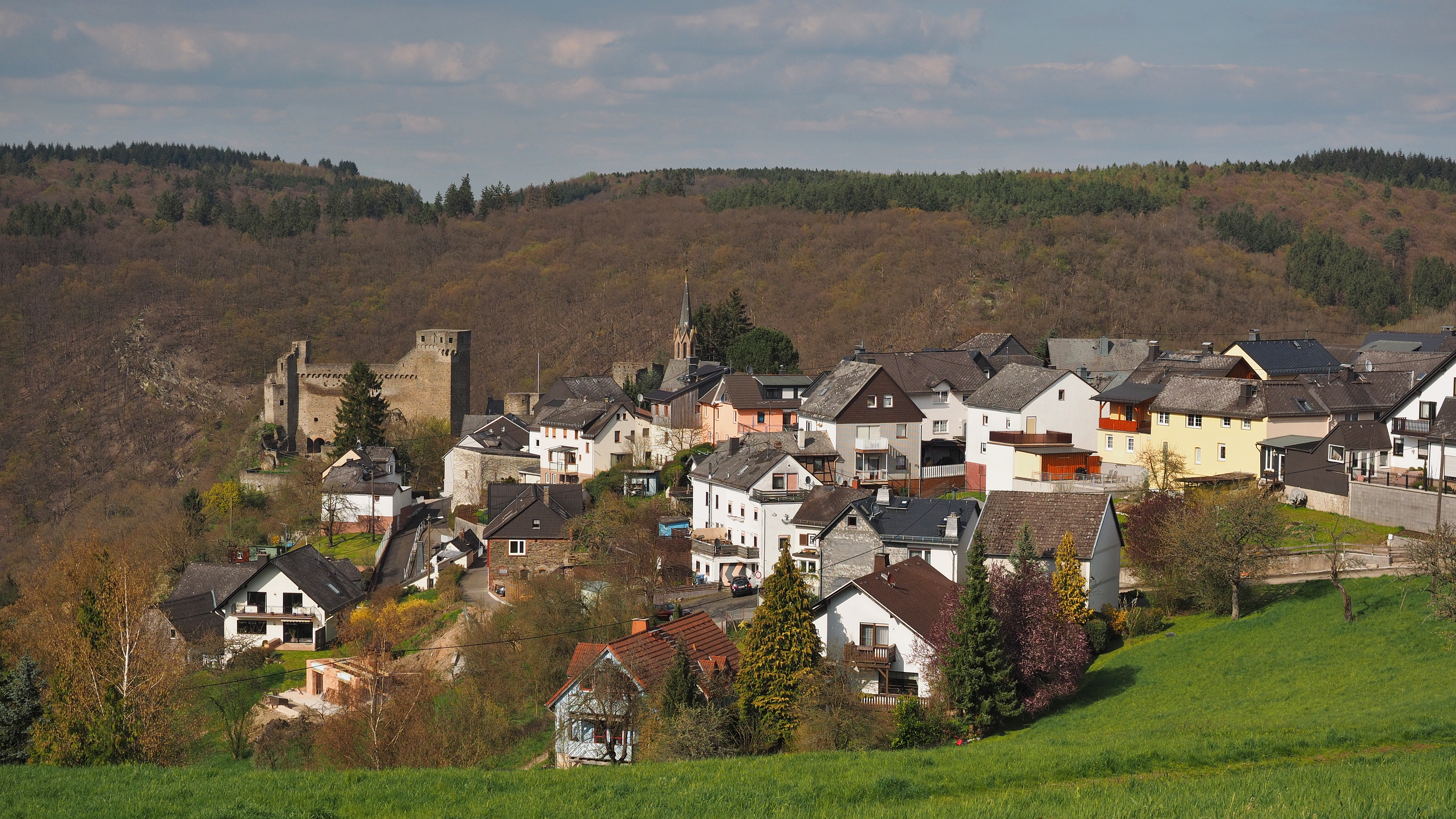

- Coat of arms

- Location of Hohenstein within Rheingau-Taunus-Kreis district
- Interactive map of Hohenstein
- Location within Germany Location within Hesse
- Coordinates: 50°12′N 08°04′E
- Country: Germany
- State: Hesse
- Admin. region: Darmstadt
- District: Rheingau-Taunus-Kreis
- Subdivisions: 7 districts

Government
  - Mayor (2018–24): Daniel Bauer

Area
  - Total: 63.79 km^{2} (24.63 sq mi)
- Elevation: 334 m (1,096 ft)

Population (2025-12-31)
  - Total: 5,872
  - Density: 92.05/km^{2} (238.4/sq mi)
- Time zone: UTC+01:00 (CET)
  - Summer (DST): UTC+02:00 (CEST)
- Postal codes: 65327–65329
- Dialling codes: 06120 / 06128
- Vehicle registration: RÜD
- Website: www.hohenstein-hessen.de

Hohenstein (German pronunciation: [ˈhoːənˌʃtaɪn]) is a municipality in the Rheingau-Taunus-Kreis in the Regierungsbezirk of Darmstadt in Hesse, Germany.

== Geography ==
=== Location ===
Hohenstein lies in the western Taunus, on both sides of the river Aar between Limburg and Wiesbaden.

=== Neighbouring communities ===
Hohenstein borders in the north on the community of Aarbergen, in the northeast on the community of Hünstetten, in the east and south on the town of Taunusstein, in the southwest on the town of Bad Schwalbach, and in the west on the community of Heidenrod (all in the Rheingau-Taunus-Kreis).

=== Constituent communities ===
Hohenstein's Ortsteile are Breithardt (administrative seat), Burg-Hohenstein, Holzhausen über Aar, Strinz-Margarethä, Born, Hennethal and Steckenroth.

== History ==
In 1184, Strinz-Margarethä had its first documentary mention, making it the earliest of Hohenstein's constituent communities to have its name appear in the historical record. The other centres followed in the 13th and 14th centuries.

In the course of municipal reform in Hesse, the current greater community of Hohenstein was founded out of the formerly self-governing communities of Breithardt, Hohenstein, Holzhausen über Aar, Strinz-Margarethä, Born, Hennethal and Steckenroth on 1 July 1972. The constituent community of Hohenstein was thereafter known as Burg-Hohenstein (Burg means “castle” in German).

== Politics ==
=== Community council ===
The municipal election held on 26 March 2006 yielded the following results:

Parties and voter communities		% 2006	Seats; 2006	% 2001	Seats; 2001
CDU	Christian Democratic Union of Germany	32.8	10	32.8	10
SPD	Social Democratic Party of Germany	52.0	16	50.5	16
FWG	Freie Wählergemeinschaft Hohenstein	15.1	5	16.7	5
Total		100.0	31	100.0	31
Voter turnout in %		55.6		70.6	

== Culture and sightseeing ==
=== Buildings ===
- At Hohenstein Castle (ruin), built about 1190 by the Counts of Katzenelnbogen and the Counts of Nassau-Laurenburg, are found a hotel and a restaurant.
- In the woods near Hennethal is found a late mediaeval border earthwork (wall-ditch complex), which was presumably built in the late 14th century to guard the Limburger Straße (road).

=== Regular events ===
- In the summer months there are theatrical productions on an open-air stage in the castle courtyard.
- Each year in late summer or early autumn, most constituent communities hold their traditional Kerb (kermis), which mostly have been organized by youth for several generations.
- Hohenstein Christmas Market

== Economy and infrastructure ==
The centres in the community, whose livelihood was once based on agriculture, have built themselves into residential communities. There are the usual trades and businesses in Hohenstein, but no true industry.

=== Transport ===
Hohenstein lies on Bundesstraße 54 between Wiesbaden and Limburg.

=== Education ===
In the constituent community of Breithardt is a primary school. The nearest comprehensive schools are to be found in Aarbergen and Taunusstein. The latter offers a Gymnasium upper level. The nearest Gymnasium is likewise to be found in Taunusstein.

== Twin towns – sister cities ==
Hohenstein Strinz-Margaretha is twinned with:

- Aube, Orne department in France
