= Schlangenbad =

- Municipality
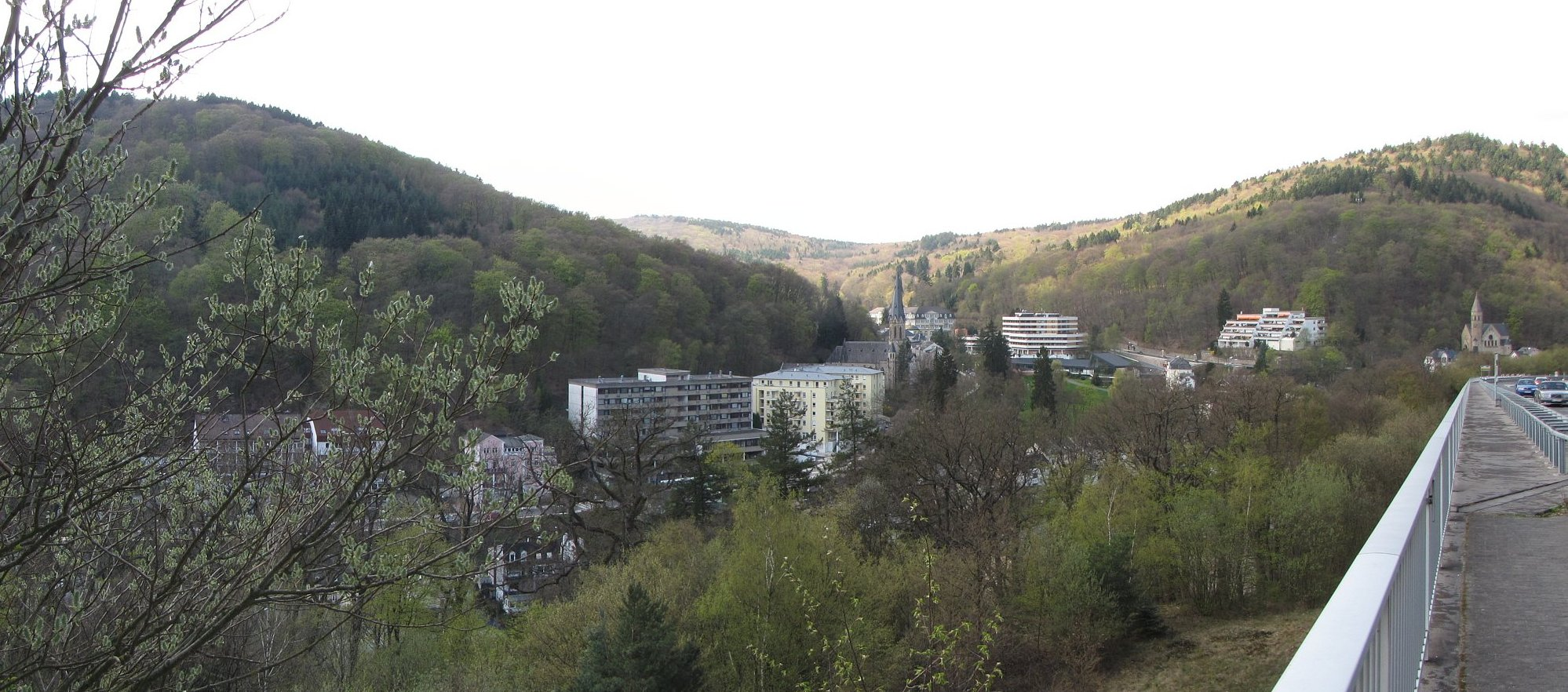

- Coat of arms

- Location of Schlangenbad within Rheingau-Taunus-Kreis district
- Interactive map of Schlangenbad
- Location within Germany Location within Hesse
- Coordinates: 50°5′39″N 8°6′12″E
- Country: Germany
- State: Hesse
- Admin. region: Darmstadt
- District: Rheingau-Taunus-Kreis

Government
  - Mayor (2018–24): Marco Eyring (CDU)

Area
  - Total: 36.55 km^{2} (14.11 sq mi)
- Elevation: 320 m (1,050 ft)

Population (2025-12-31)
  - Total: 6,004
  - Density: 164.3/km^{2} (425.5/sq mi)
- Time zone: UTC+01:00 (CET)
  - Summer (DST): UTC+02:00 (CEST)
- Postal codes: 65388
- Dialling codes: 06129
- Vehicle registration: RÜD
- Website: www.schlangenbad.de

Schlangenbad is a municipality in the Rheingau-Taunus-Kreis in the Regierungsbezirk of Darmstadt in Hesse, Germany.

== Geography ==
=== Location ===
The community, which is a health resort (Kurort), lies 320 m (1,050 ft) above sea level in a sheltered location on a valley slope on the southern slope of the Taunus 12 km (7.5 mi) from Wiesbaden, 7 km (4.3 mi) from Eltville and 7 km (4.3 mi) from Bad Schwalbach.

=== Neighbouring communities ===
Schlangenbad borders in the north on the town of Bad Schwalbach, in the east on the town of Taunusstein and the district-free city of Wiesbaden, in the south on the town of Eltville and the community of Kiedrich and in the west on the town of Oestrich-Winkel.

=== Constituent communities ===
Schlangenbad's Ortsteile are the state-recognized health resort of Schlangenbad and its outlying centres of Georgenborn, Wambach, Bärstadt, Hausen vor der Höhe, Obergladbach and Niedergladbach.

=== Climate ===
In Schlangenbad, the climate is what is known in German as a Schonklima, which means a climate with temperatures that never get too high (no higher than 21 °C (70 °F) in the warmest months) and without great temperature fluctuations, usually occurring together with good shelter from prevailing winds. It does, however, cool off quite sharply in the nighttime. This moderate climate is comparable to a Mediterranean climate.

The temperate climate permits a remnant population of Aesculapian Snakes to survive in the area, despite the general cooling of the climate in what is now Germany. These snakes were once widespread in Middle Europe in warmer times, but are now otherwise only found in Mediterranean lands. Indeed, snakes are Schlangenbad's namesake: the community's name literally means “Snake Bath” in German.

== Spa operations ==
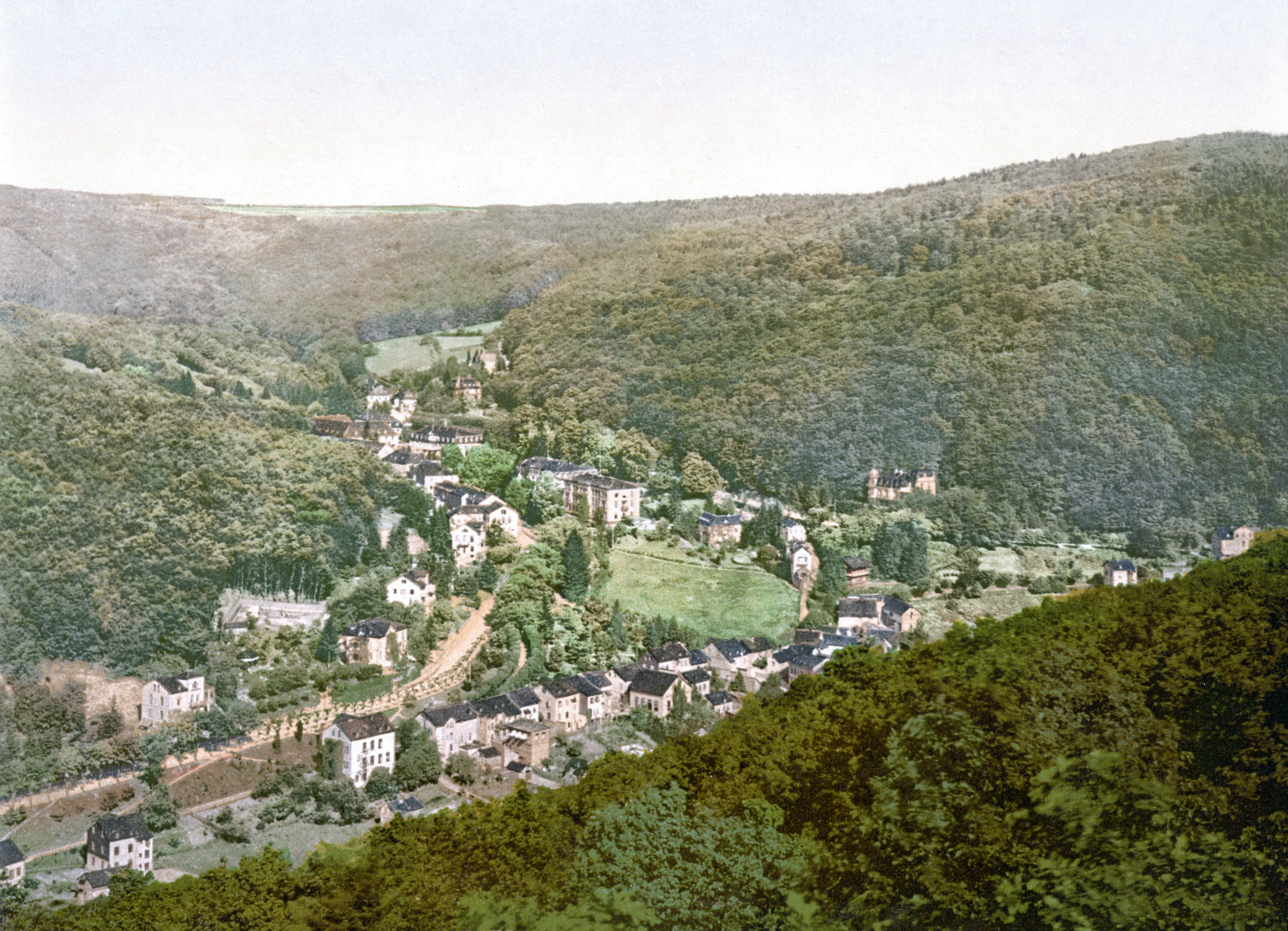
Bad Schlangenbad about 1900

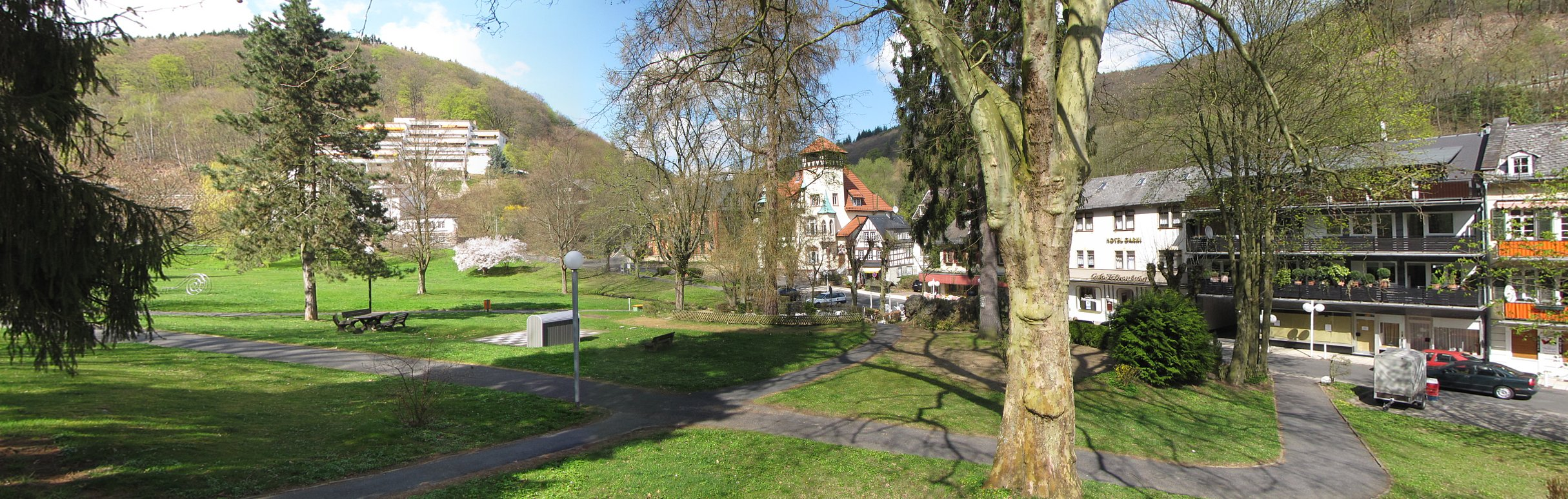

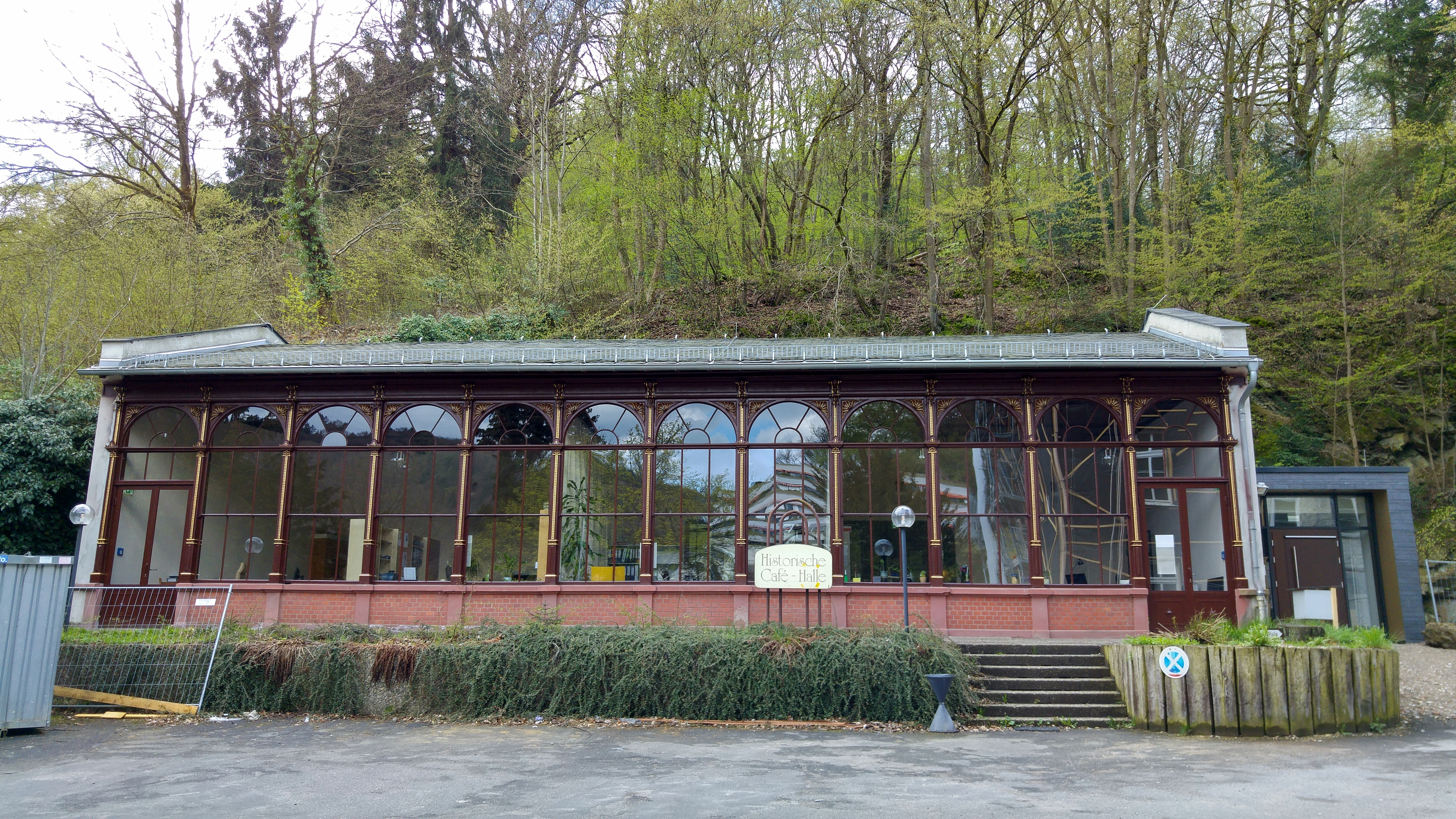
Historic Café Hall in Schlangenbad (near Wiesbaden)

Schlangenbad's thermal springs were discovered in the mid 17th century. Today, nine springs are running altogether. They issue from the ground at temperatures between 21 °C (70 °F) and 32 °C (90 °F) on the south slope of the Bärstädter Kopf. Rheumatic and other inflammatory illnesses are treated at the spa.

=== Sport and leisure facilities ===
- Thermal outdoor swimming pool with kelosauna
- Aeskulap-Therme (baths)
- Schlangenbad tennis courts
- Heinz Grein-Sporthalle Georgenborn
- Sporthalle Bärstadt
- Hausen football pitch

=== Hiking trails ===
- The Rheinsteig, a new trail from Schloss Biebrich near Wiesbaden to Bonn by way of the Loreley, the “Enemy Brothers” castles (Liebenstein and Sterrenberg) and Lahneck Castle.
- Hiking trail to Rauenthal about 45 minutes away, with an outstanding view over the Rhine Gorge.
- Loop trails at the "Förster-Bitter-Eiche" carpark near the "Hinterlandswald".

== Politics ==
=== Community council ===
The municipal election held on 26 March 2006 yielded the following results:

Parties and voter communities		% 2006	Seats; 2006	% 2001	Seats; 2001
CDU	Christian Democratic Union of Germany	48.3	15	38.0	12
SPD	Social Democratic Party of Germany	26.1	8	35.6	11
GREENS	Bündnis 90/Die Grünen	12.4	4	9.6	3
FDP	Free Democratic Party	8.9	3	12.5	4
PRO	PRO-Schlangenbad	4.2	1	4.2	1
Total		100.0	31	100.0	31
Voter turnout in %		57.7		59.0	

=== Town partnerships ===
- Craponne, Rhône, France

== Education ==
- Bärstadt primary school

== Famous people ==
=== Sons and daughters of the town ===
- Ludwig von Lauter (1855–1929), Prussian artillery general
- Max Knoll (1897–1969), German electrical engineer, codeveloper of the first electron microscope

=== Former and current Schlangenbad residents ===
- Ludwig Berger (1892–1969), filmmaker and writer
- Volker Schlöndorff (1939– ), filmmaker and Oscar winner
- Wolf von Lojewski (1937– ), television moderator
- Zascha Kourosh Pezeshkan (1969–Present), KRAFT Construction in Florida

=== Fiction ===
- Grant Allen's fictional late 19th century lady detective Miss Lois Cayley visits Schlangenbad in the 1899 novel Miss Cayley's Adventures.
