= Rheingau-Taunus-Kreis =

Coordinates: 50°08′54″N 8°04′24″E

Rheingau-Taunus
- District
- Flag Coat of arms
- Country: Germany
- State: Hesse
- Adm. region: Darmstadt
- Capital: Bad Schwalbach

Government
  - District admin.: Sandro Zehner (CDU)

Area
  - Total: 811.11 km^{2} (313.17 sq mi)

Population (31 December 2025)
  - Total: 185,359
  - Density: 228.53/km^{2} (591.88/sq mi)
- Time zone: UTC+01:00 (CET)
  - Summer (DST): UTC+02:00 (CEST)
- Vehicle registration: RÜD, SWA
- Website: www.rheingau-taunus.de

Rheingau-Taunus is a Kreis (district) in the west of Hesse, Germany. Rheingau-Taunus-Kreis is part of the Darmstadt region; its main administrative seat is Bad Schwalbach. Outposted sections of the local administration are located in Idstein and Rüdesheim am Rhein.

Neighbouring districts are the Hessian districts of Limburg-Weilburg, Hochtaunuskreis, Main-Taunus-Kreis, district-free Wiesbaden and Mainz-Bingen and Rhein-Lahn which are located in Rhineland-Palatinate.

== History ==
From 983 to 1803, the Rheingau area belonged to the Electorate of Mainz and was then merged into the new Duchy of Nassau.

The Untertaunus region was part of the Earldom of Katzenelnbogen. From 1816 onward, the whole area of the district became part of the Duchy of Nassau. After the 1866 Austro-Prussian war, Nassau was annexed by Prussia and formed the new province of Hesse-Nassau.

In 1867, the province was divided into districts. Therefore, the districts of Rheingau and Untertaunus were created.

After the Second World War and the creation of Hesse in 1946, these two districts remained unchanged. Only in 1977, because administrative borders were redrawn, the districts of Rheingau and Untertaunus merged and thus formed the Rheingau-Taunus district.

== Geography ==
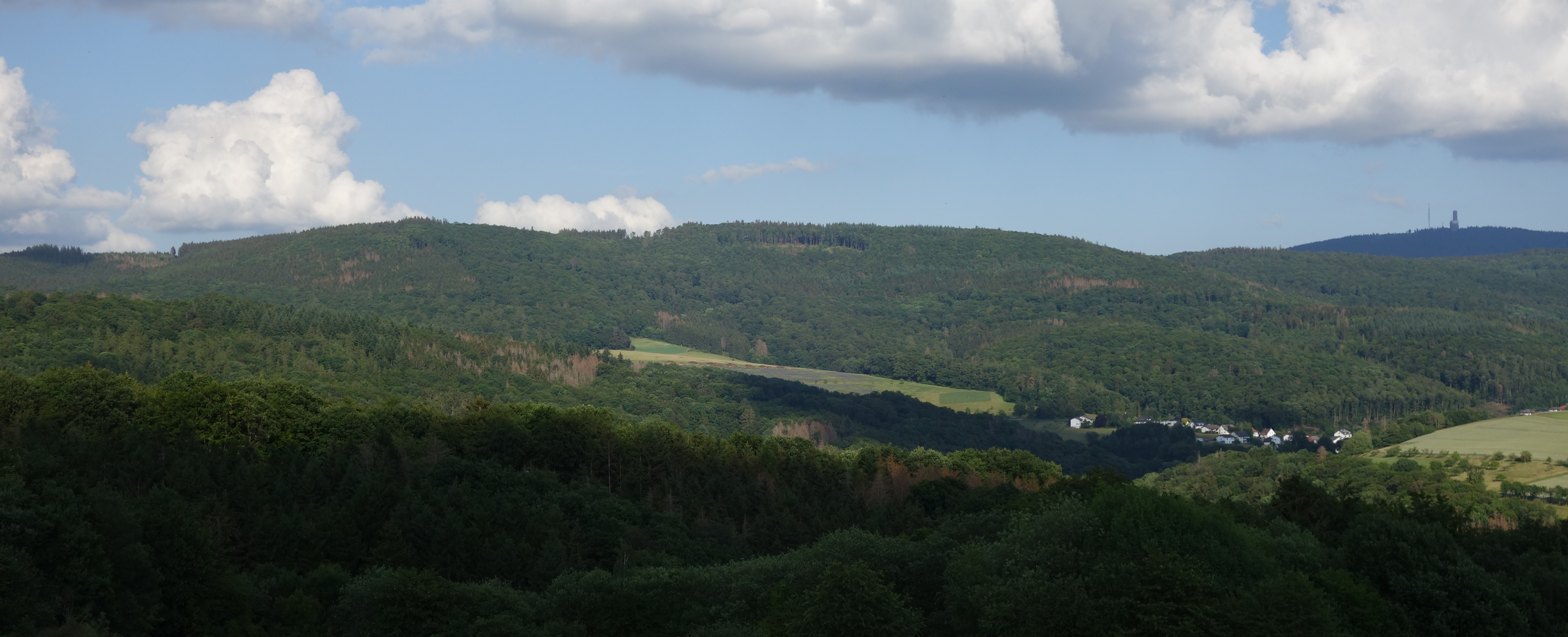
Highest point of the Rheingau-Taunus-Kreis:629,3 m high mountain Windhain above Waldems-Wüstems' roofs; on the right in the back Großer Feldberg is visible, the highest mountain of the entire Taunus mountain range.

The district covers the western part of the Taunus mountains. The river Rhine forms the district's border in the south.

== Politics ==
=== District council ===
Recent district elections had the following results:

Parties and voter communities		% 2016	Seats; 2016	% 2011	Seats; 2011	% 2006	Seats; 2006	% 2001	Seats; 2001
CDU	Christian Democratic Union	35.3	21	35.8	22	39.8	24	39.1	28
SPD	Social Democratic Party	24.1	15	30.8	19	33.6	20	37.2	26
GRÜNE	Alliance 90/The Greens	11.2	7	18.9	12	10.3	6	10.0	7
FDP	Free Democratic Party	6.8	4	5.0	3	6.1	4	6.5	5
DIE LINKE	The Left	3.2	2	2.3	1	—	—	—	—
FWG	Freie Wähler Gemeinschaft Rheingau-Taunus (Independent Voters Community)	6.0	4	7.2	4	7.5	5	4.5	3
REP	The Republicans	—	—	—	—	2.7	2	2.7	2
AFD	Alternative for Germany	13.4	8	—	—	—	—	—	—
Total		100.0	61	100.0	61	100.0	61	100.0	71
Voter turnout %		53.2		51.4		50.0		55.6	

=== Coat of arms ===
The coat of arms combines the coat of arms of the two former districts - in the bottom right the Mainz wheel taken from the Rheingau district, in the top left the lion of Nassau from the former Untertaunuskreis.

== Subdivisions ==
Clickable map of towns and municipalities in the district

=== Towns ===
1. Bad Schwalbach
2. Eltville
3. Geisenheim
4. Idstein
5. Lorch
6. Oestrich-Winkel
7. Rüdesheim
8. Taunusstein

=== Municipalities ===
1. Aarbergen
2. Heidenrod
3. Hohenstein
4. Hünstetten
5. Kiedrich
6. Niedernhausen
7. Schlangenbad
8. Waldems
9. Walluf

== Transport ==
Rhein-Main-Verkehrsverbund (RMV)

The disteict is a member of the transport association Rhein-Main-Verkehrsverbund (RMV).
