= Taunusstein =

- Town
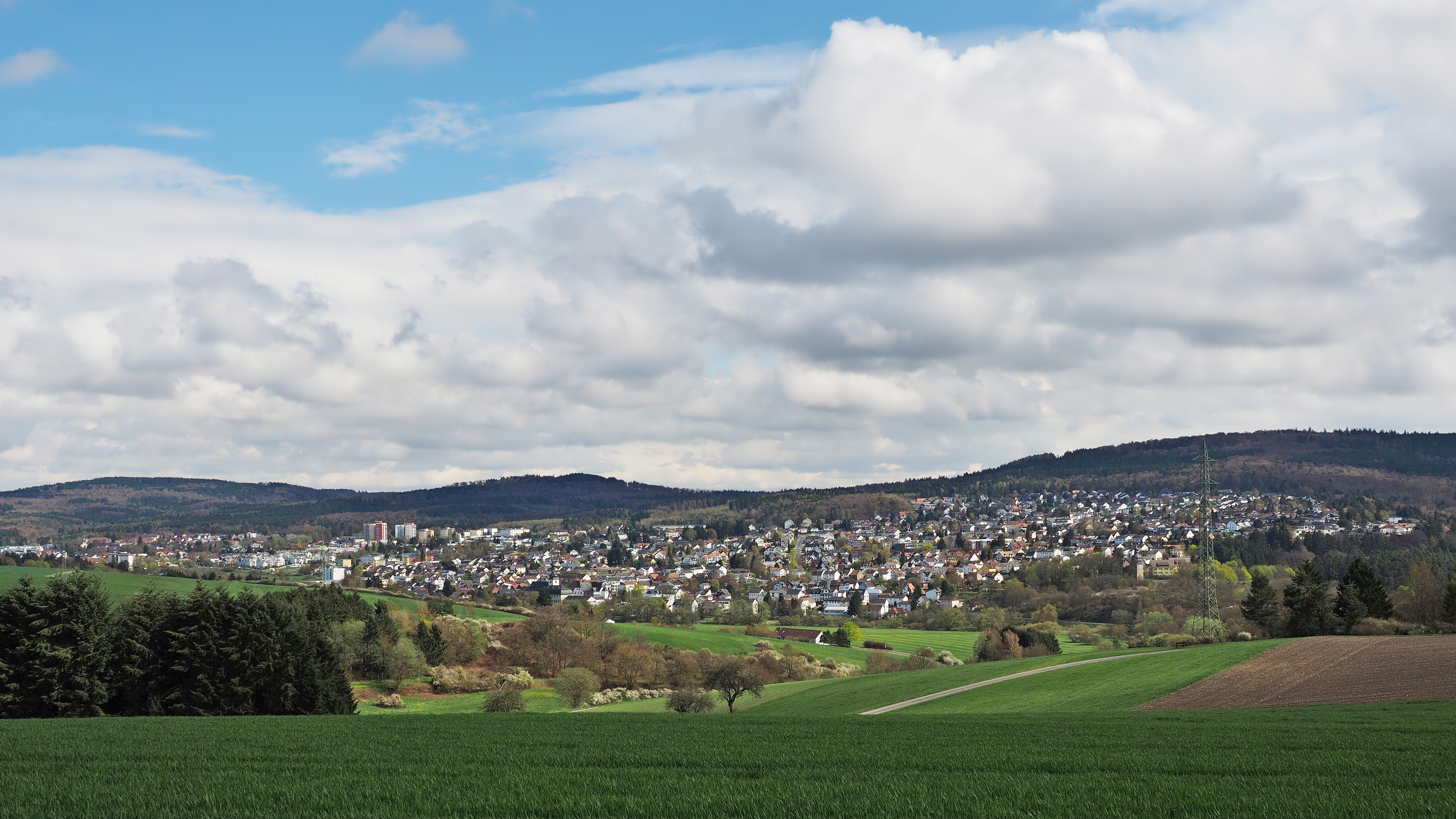
- General view

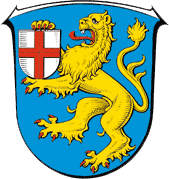
- Coat of arms

- Location of Taunusstein within Rheingau-Taunus-Kreis district
- Interactive map of Taunusstein
- Location within Germany Location within Hesse
- Coordinates: 50°8′N 8°9′E
- Country: Germany
- State: Hesse
- Admin. region: Darmstadt
- District: Rheingau-Taunus-Kreis
- Subdivisions: 10 districts

Government
  - Mayor (2019–25): Sandro Zehner (CDU)

Area
  - Total: 67.03 km^{2} (25.88 sq mi)
- Elevation: 381 m (1,250 ft)

Population (2025-12-31)
  - Total: 30,156
  - Density: 449.9/km^{2} (1,165/sq mi)
- Time zone: UTC+01:00 (CET)
  - Summer (DST): UTC+02:00 (CEST)
- Postal codes: 65232
- Dialling codes: 06128
- Vehicle registration: RÜD, SWA
- Website: www.taunusstein.de

Taunusstein (German: [ˈtaʊnʊsˌʃtaɪn]) is the biggest town in the Rheingau-Taunus-Kreis in the Regierungsbezirk of Darmstadt in Hesse, Germany. It has 30,068 inhabitants (2020).

== Geography ==
=== Location ===
Taunusstein lies roughly 10 km northwest of Wiesbaden and about 10 km west of Idstein and the Autobahn A 3. It is part of the Untertaunus (lower Taunus) range.

Taunusstein itself is a rural area and is about 30 km from the river Rhine. The lowest point in Taunusstein is 310 m above sea level, and the highest 613.9 m.

=== Neighbouring communities ===
Taunusstein borders in the north on the communities of Hohenstein and Hünstetten and the town of Idstein, in the east on the community of Niedernhausen, in the south on the district-free city of Wiesbaden and in the west on the community of Schlangenbad and the town of Bad Schwalbach.

=== Constituent communities ===
Taunusstein is made up of ten Stadtteile:

Stadtteil	Population
Bleidenstadt	7,852
Hahn	7,344
Hambach	368
Neuhof	2,650
Niederlibbach	570
Orlen	1,240
Seitzenhahn	1,366
Watzhahn	295
Wehen	6,831
Wingsbach	762

== History ==
The town of Taunusstein came into being on 1 October 1971 through the merger of the formerly self-governing communities of Bleidenstadt, Hahn, Neuhof, Seitzenhahn, Watzhahn and Wehen, whereupon Taunusstein was also given town rights. On 1 July 1972, the communities of Hambach, Niederlibbach, Orlen and Wingsbach were amalgamated into the town of Taunusstein.

In 1991, Dr.-Peter-Nikolaus-Platz, a square in the constituent community of Hahn, was dedicated and named after the longtime mayor of Taunusstein. Fronting onto it are the "Taunus" community centre, the Catholic church centre of St. Johannes Nepomuk and the New Town Hall, whose functions together make the square into the new town centre. The "Taunus" community centre was opened in 1989, the church centre in 1991, both designed by the Hamburg architect Bernhard Hirche, from whom also sprang the whole concept of planning the new town centre. It was not until 1998, on the other hand, that the Town Hall, designed by another architect, could be dedicated.

== Population development ==
Each time at 31 December (counting only those with their main residences in the town)

Historical population

Year	Pop.	±%
1998	28,192	—
1999	28,354	+0.6%
2000	28,745	+1.4%
2001	28,942	+0.7%
2002	29,113	+0.6%
2003	29,307	+0.7%

Year	Pop.	±%
2004	29,389	+0.3%
2005	29,325	−0.2%
2006	33,212	+13.3%
2007	29,221	−12.0%
2008	29,012	−0.7%
2009	28,871	−0.5%

Year	Pop.	±%
2010	28,853	−0.1%
2011	28,920	+0.2%
2012	29,097	+0.6%
2016	29,620	—

=== Religion ===
- There are several Lutheran and Catholic churches in almost every constituent community.
- Baháʼí community in Hahn
- New Apostolic church in Wehen
- Kingdom Hall of Jehovah's Witnesses in Neuhof (Triebgewann industrial park)

== Politics ==
=== Town council ===
The municipal election held on 27 March 2016 yielded the following results:

Parties and voter communities		% 2016	Seats; 2016	% 2011	Seats; 2011	% 2006	Seats; 2006
CDU	Christian Democratic Union of Germany	39.9	18	35.1	16	40.7	18
SPD	Social Democratic Party of Germany	22.7	10	30.3	14	30.2	14
GREENS	Alliance 90/The Greens	12.0	5	21.1	9	14.4	6
FWG	Independents	15.3	7	7.5	3	8.7	4
FDP	Free Democratic Party	10.1	5	6.0	3	6.1	3
Total		100.0	45	100.0	45	100.0	45
Voter turnout in %		50.4		48.9		46.3	

=== Mayor ===
Mayor Sandro Zehner (CDU), running unopposed, was elected to a second term on 26 May 2019 on the first vote with 79.1% of the vote. Voter turnout was 58.8%.

=== River Aar ===
The Aar (Lahn) has its source in the stadtteil Orlen 500 meters from the ruins of Roman Castle Zugmantel and the Bundesstraße 417 in the Orlen part of Taunusstein.

=== Limes ===
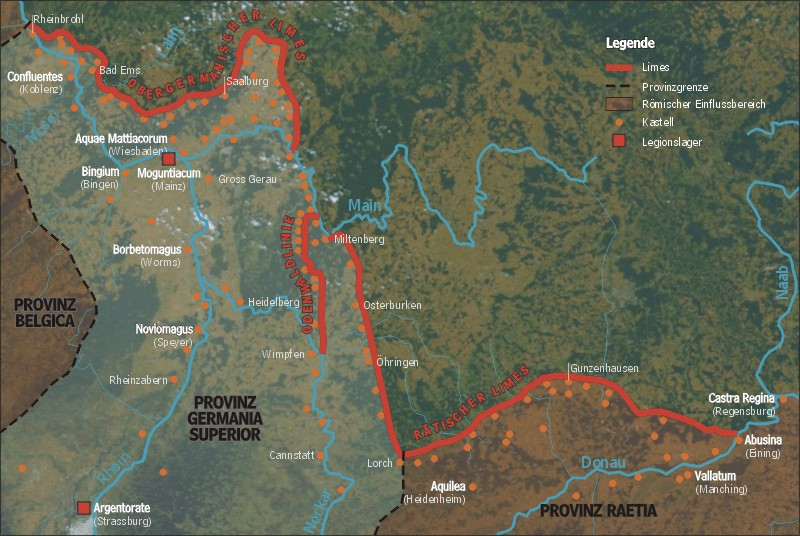
Map of Upper Germanic Limes

The north of Taunusstein is crossed by the Upper Germanic Limes, a line of frontier forts begun in AD 86 by the Romans which stretched from near Bonn on the Rhine to near Regensburg on the Danube. It divided the Roman Empire from the unconquered Germanic tribes. Close to Orlen and the Bundesstraße 417 is a replica of a Limes watchtower, right beside the remains of the castrum Zugmantel.

The Upper-Germanic-Rhaetian Limes (the Limes Germanicus) is a UNESCO World Heritage Site.

=== Coat of arms ===
The town's arms might be described thus: Azure a lion rampant Or armed and langued gules, in his forepaws an escutcheon, argent a cross gules.

The golden lion recalls the centuries-long overlordship of the Counts and Princes of Nassau, and at the same time draws on the old arms borne by the Nassau Amt seat of Wehen and the communities of Hahn and Seitzenhahn, all of which were charged with a lion or a lion's head. The cross is an attribute of Saint Ferrutius, the Bleidenstadt Monastery's patron saint. This monastery was founded as early as the 8th century and earned much credit for bringing Christianity and culture into the region on the upper Aar. The former community of Bleidenstadt bore this cross in its former coat of arms.

The official blazon reads: In blau ein rotbewehrter goldener Löwe, in seinen Pranken ein silberner Schild mit durchgehendem roten Kreuz.

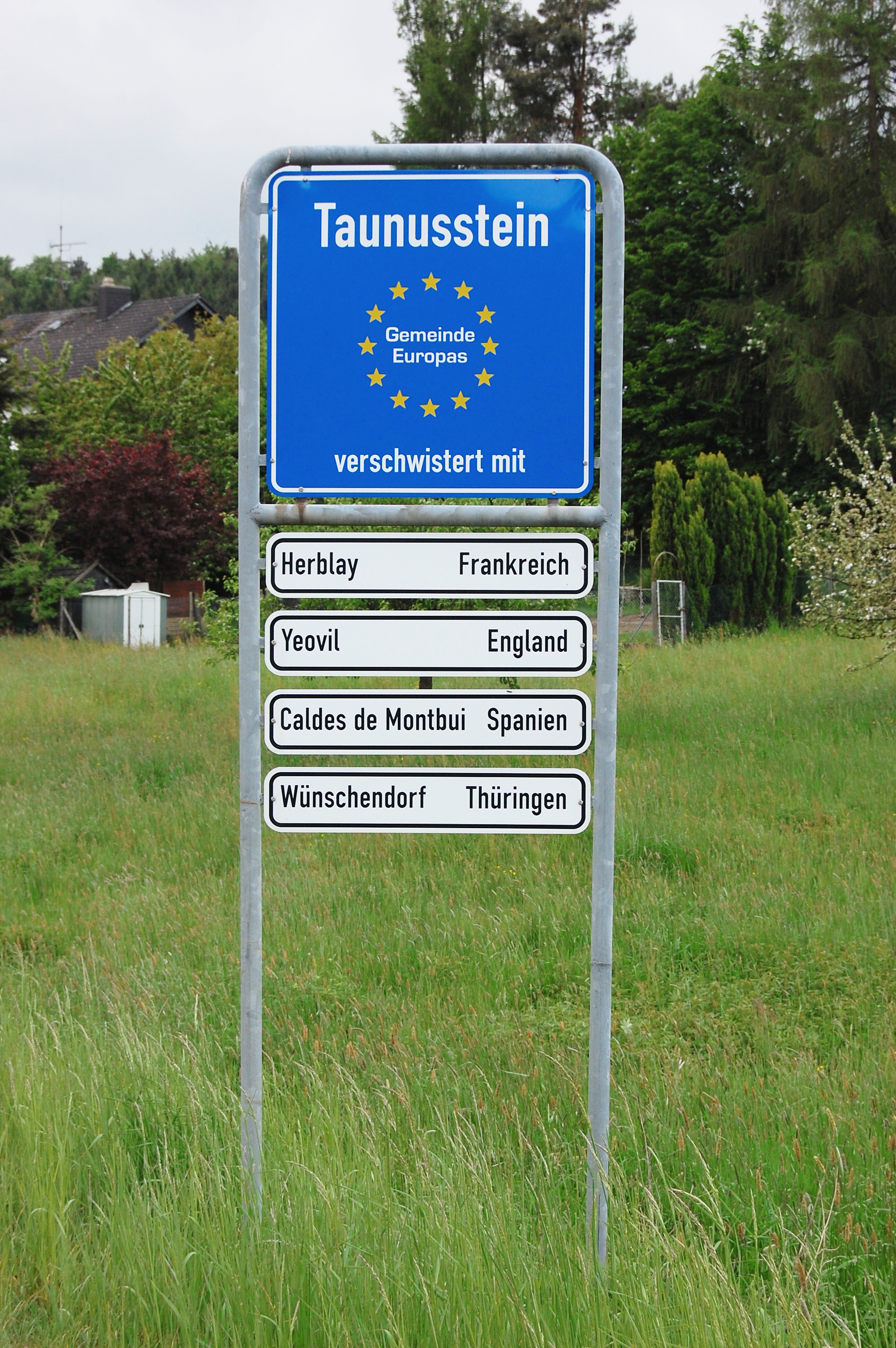
Signpost in Wingsbach

== Economy and infrastructure ==
=== Transport ===
There are two railway stations (in Hahn and Bleidenstadt) which lie on the stretch of the Aartalbahn running through Taunusstein, however since 1983 the line was only used for steam tourist trips run by the Nassauische Touristik-Bahn (NTB). But since a truck damaged a bridge on the line in Wiesbaden-Dotzheim on 20 November 2009 then the line had to be closed completely. Despite promises from the city council of Wiesbaden money to replace the bridge has not been forthcoming, and the NTB are themselves facing financial problems due to not being able to run any trains on the line.

In 1998 it was proposed that the line be reopened to form part of a new light rail line into Wiesbaden Stadtbahn, this was however dropped in 2001. Although some plans for such a line have been revived since the 2011 election, these do not currently involve this section of the line.

The town is also linked to Wiesbaden over Bundesstraßen 417 (Neuhof/Wehen) and 54 (Hahn). The nearest Autobahn interchange is on the A 3 (Cologne–Frankfurt) in Idstein.

The nearest international airport is Frankfurt Airport, about 25 miles away. The smaller Mainz Finthen Airport, a regional public airfield, is about 15 miles away.

=== Established businesses ===
- Institut Fresenius in Neuhof
- Motorola Deutschland (German business headquarters, advertising and marketing) in Neuhof
- Brita GmbH water filtration, international headquarters in Neuhof and Wiesbaden

=== Education ===
- Silberbachschule, primary school in Wehen
- Obere Aar integrated comprehensive school in Hahn
- Regenbogenschule, primary school in Bleidenstadt
- Gymnasium in Bleidenstadt
- Sonnenschule primary school in Neuhof
- Untertaunus vocational schools in Hahn
- Europa-Schule Taunusstein - bilingual Realschule in Neuhof

=== Sport and leisure facilities ===
- Stadion am Halberg in Wehen, former home stadium to SV Wehen Wiesbaden's first team
- Outdoor swimming pool in Hahn
- Silberbachhalle in Wehen
- Aartalhalle in Neuhof
- Sporting grounds in almost every centre
- Sport and youth centre in Bleidenstadt

== Culture and sightseeing ==
=== Museum ===
In 1995, the Museum of the Town of Taunusstein, with permanent rooms at the Wehen Castle, was established. Since then, there has been a thematic emphasis on more recent regional history as seen in a permanent exhibit featuring this, which lately has also presented information about Taunusstein's condition in, before and after the World War II. This it does mainly by exhibiting everyday culture in the first half of the 20th century. A second and equally valid pillar is the displays in the series Kunst im Schloss ("Art at the Palace") through which contemporary art – not only from the local region – is offered a forum in Taunusstein.

=== Buildings ===
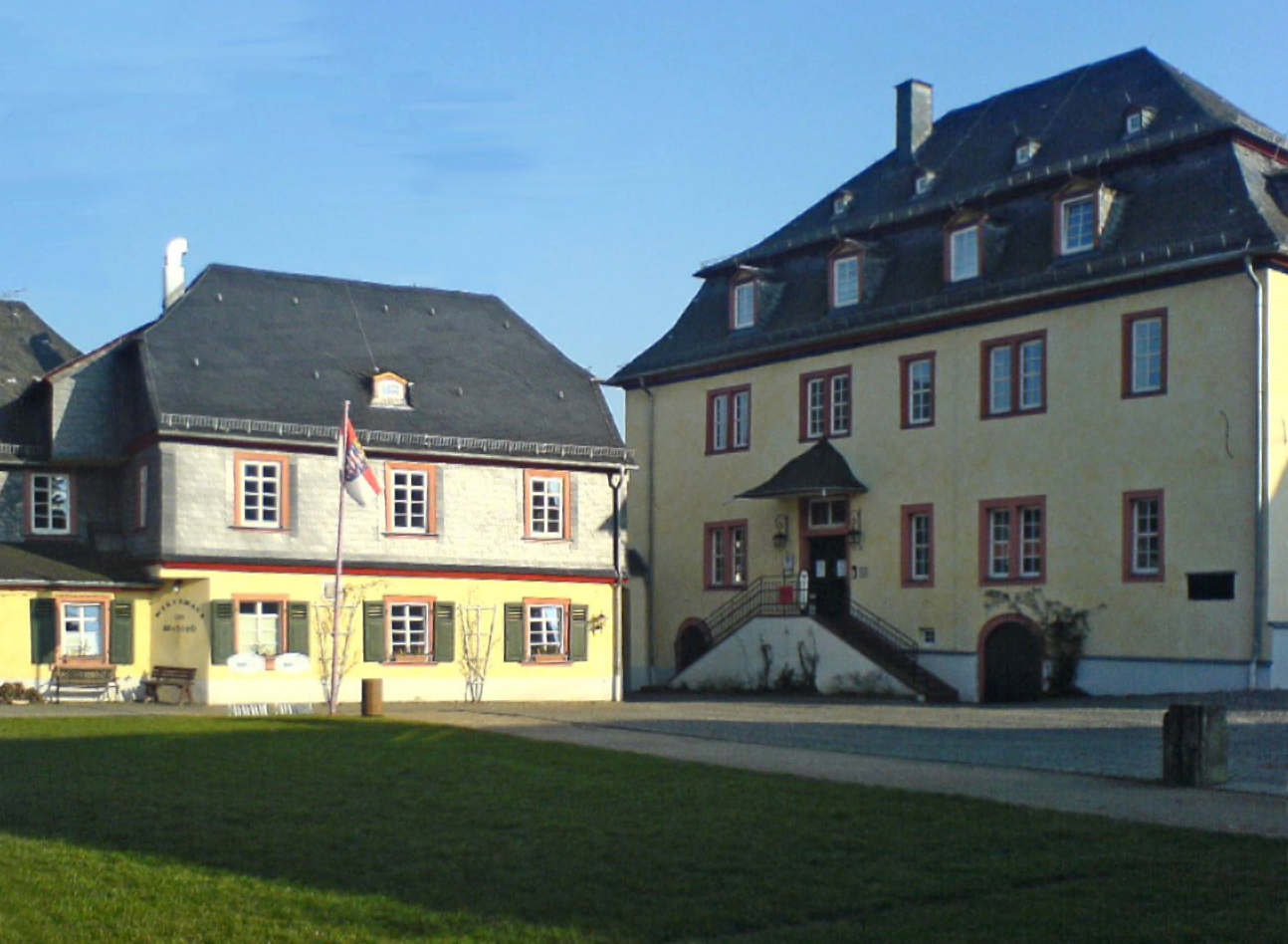
Wehen Castle

Wehen Castle
Formerly used for, among other things, a widow's seat and a hunting palace, it now houses the Taunusstein Museum.
Wehen Evangelical church
This was built by using stones from the old town fortifications, with a black marble altar brought from the Idstein palace church in 1722 and furnishings from the secularized monasteries at Marienhausen and Eberbach. The historic Voigt organ is one of the few instruments by Wiesbaden organ builder Heinrich Voigt still preserved in its original state. It was built in 1890 for the Old Catholic congregation of Wiesbaden and acquired by the Wehen congregation in 1899. In October 1999 it was restored to its original condition.
Former Wehen school
Built about 1900, this building is transitional in design between the Gründerzeit and Art Nouveau.
Former monastery with church, Bleidenstadt
(Nowadays parish church of the Catholic parish of St. Ferrutius). Above the church's main door is the statue of Saint Ferrutius, the patron saint, from the 17th century. Inside the building are a wall tabernacle from High Gothic times, made of sandstone and built into the quire, a baptismal font from 1696, a Late Baroque Madonna and an organ remodelled in the Baroque style. In the belfry are two bells from 1309 and 1411.
Evangelical church, Bleidenstadt
(Formerly Catholic parish church of Saint Peter on the Mountain, after 1530 relinquished to the new Protestant community). The church has the constituent community's oldest stone memorial, a tomb slab commemorating the Minister Johannes von Spangenberg, who died in 1363. The lower part of the churchtower is of Romanesque Revival origin and built with a decorative rose window with sandstone ornamentation.

=== Jewish graveyard in Wehen ===
The Jewish graveyard in the constituent community of Wehen on the Halberg is roughly as old as the community itself.

In 1329, Count Gerlach of Nassau-Weilburg mandated the settlement of Jews. The gravestones from that time no longer exist. The oldest one still standing is from 1694. Today, 55 graves are still to be seen in the graveyard. Until 1749, Jews from Wiesbaden were also buried here. In 1726, the Jews applied for leave to build a wall around the graveyard; however, they were forbidden to do so, as it would not have done for the Jewish cemetery to look nicer than the Christian one. So, they simply dug a ditch. After 1933, when the Nazis had come to power, the graveyard was still used for burials; however, it was forbidden to put gravestones on these newer graves.

=== Regular events ===
- Bleischter Kerb (kermis)
- Orlener Markt (market)
- Orlener Kerb (kermis)
- Hahner Kerb (kermis)
- Zentrumsfest ("Centre Festival")
- Weher Markt (With this market it is a tradition for companies in Weher to take their employees for brunch at the market)
- Weher Kerb (kermis)
- Wingsbacher Kerb (kermis)
- Neuhofer Kerb (kermis)
- TIGA (Taunusstein industrial and business exhibition; in even-numbered years)
- Waldweihnachtsmarkt Hahn ("Forest Christmas Market", at the Altenstein Forest House)

=== Sport ===
One of the local football clubs, located in Wehen, is called SV Wehen and in April 2007 they won promotion into the 2nd tier of the German Football League (Second Bundesliga). As such the local facilities that they had been using were no longer sufficient for professional football, prompting relocation to Wiesbaden, where they became known as SV Wehen-Wiesbaden. As of 2020–21 season, they however play in the 3rd tier.

The team is sponsored by one of the major companies of the area, Brita, with the founder of Brita, Heinz Hankammer, being a former chairman of the football club. During his time he made funds available which allowed the team it to outdo most teams at this level for many years, and gain promotion into the professional leagues.

== Twin towns – sister cities ==
Taunusstein is twinned with:

- Herblay-sur-Seine, France (1973)
- Yeovil, England, United Kingdom (1987)
- Caldes de Montbui, Spain (1989)
- Wünschendorf/Elster, Germany (1991)
- Toro, Italy (2016)
- Merkwiller-Pechelbronn, France (2022)

== Notable people ==
- Carl Friedrich Emil von Ibell (1780–1834), government president of the Duchy of Nassau/Hesse-Homburg
- Emil Erlenmeyer (1825–1909), chemist
- Horst Arndt (1934–2014), rower, Olympic medalist, died here
- Johannes Hill (born 1988), baritone
