= Concertino da camera (Ibert) =

1935 composition by Jacques Ibert

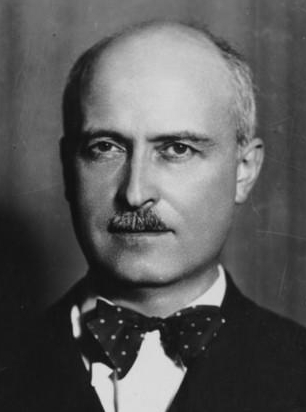
Jacques Ibert

The Concertino da camera for alto saxophone and eleven instruments was written by Jacques Ibert in 1935. Ibert dedicated the work to saxophone pioneer Sigurd Raschèr, who premiered the first movement in 1935. Later that year, Ibert completed the second movement, which was performed for the first time in its entirety by Raschèr in December 1935.

The work is in two movements; the first, Allegro con moto, is lively and technically challenging and the second begins with a lyrical Larghetto, featuring soaring lines in the saxophone's upper register. A short cadenza links to the movement's concluding Animato molto. The concerto is distinctive for its large range requiring the use of the saxophone's top-tones.

The accompanying ensemble consists of flute, oboe, clarinet, bassoon, horn, trumpet, two violins, viola, cello, and double bass.

The piece shares similarities with his concerto for flute.
