= Schulich School of Music =

Faculty of McGill University

Coordinates: 45.50573°N 73.57345°W

- École de musique Schulich (French)
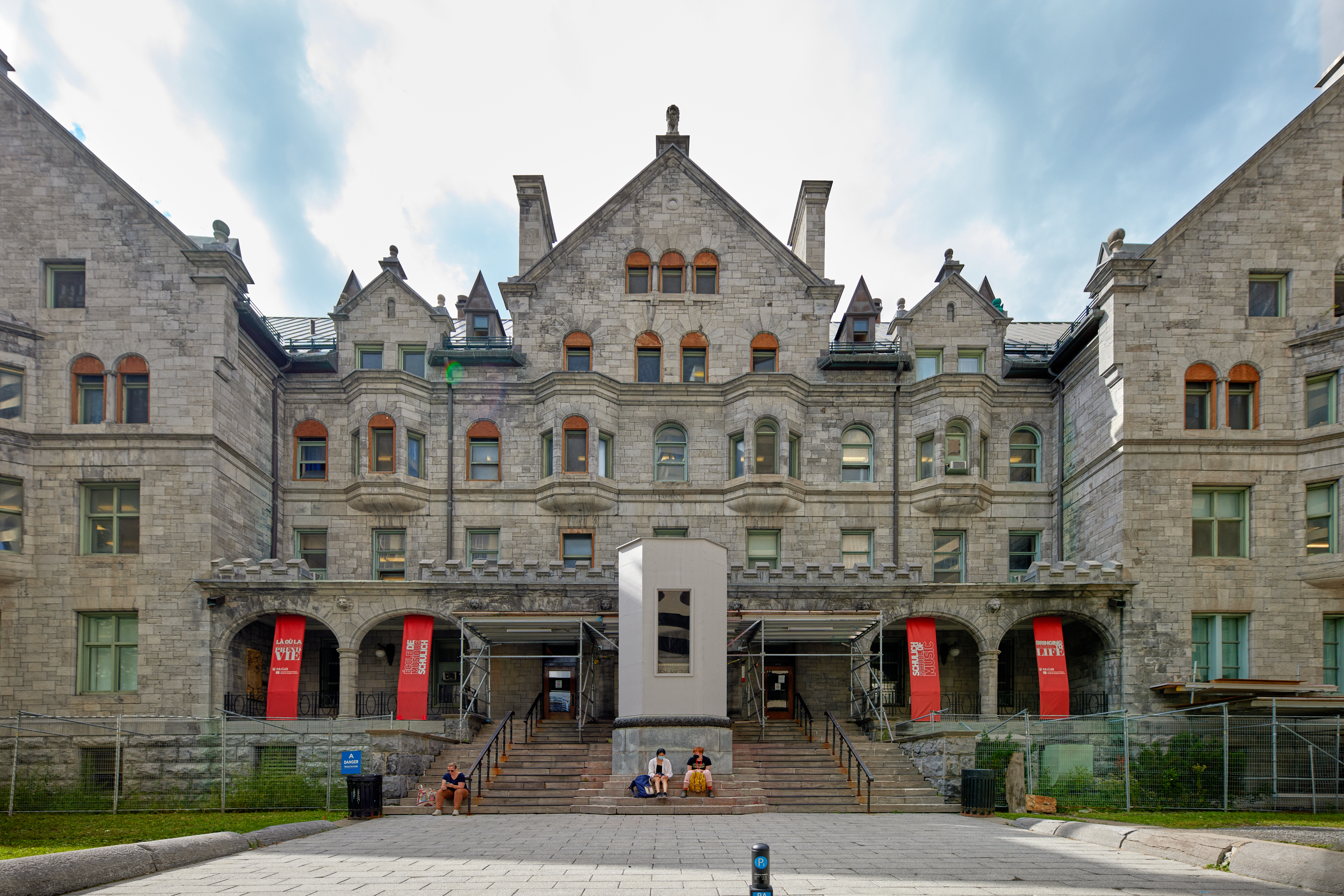
- Strathcona Music Building
- Type: Public music school
- Established: 1904; 122 years ago
- Parent institution: McGill University
- Dean: Sean Alastair Ferguson
- Faculty: 200+
- Students: Approximately 875
- Location: Strathcona Music Building, 555 rue Sherbrooke Ouest, Montreal, Quebec, Canada
- Campus: Urban
- Language: English
- Named for: Seymour Schulich
- Website: mcgill.ca/music

The Schulich School of Music (also known as Schulich) is one of the constituent faculties of McGill University in Montreal, Quebec, Canada. It is located at 555, Rue Sherbrooke Ouest (555, Sherbrooke Street West). The faculty was named after the benefactor Seymour Schulich.

McGill University's Schulich School of Music runs 50 different programs in research and performance and holds 700 concerts annually. Over 35% of the student body is international. At least 13 Grammy Award winners have been affiliated with the Schulich School of Music, including George Massenburg, Estelí Gomez, Serban Ghenea, Steven Epstein, Jennifer Gasoi, Brian Losch, Chilly Gonzales, Win Butler, Jason O'Connell, Nick Squire, Leonard Cohen, Richard King, Régine Chassagne, and Burt Bacharach.

== History ==
=== Early history ===
Music teaching at the institution began in 1884, with a program reserved for women. In 1889, a teaching specialist was engaged at the request of the students by a gift from the university's Chancellor, Donald A. Smith, Lord Strathcona. In 1896, the Royal Victoria College for girls by Lord Strathcona was founded. In September 1899, the Royal Victoria College was opened, and pianist Clara Lichtenstein (1860–1946) arrived on the invitation of Lord Strathcona. In 1902, examinations of the Associate Board of the Royal Schools of Music of London were introduced.

=== McGill Conservatorium of Music ===
- 1904 Introduction of the Licentiate diploma (LMus), Bachelor in Music degree (BMus), and Doctor in Music degree (DMus).
- September 21, classes began in the Workman House with 426 students and 23 instructors.
- October 14, official inauguration in the presence of the Governor General, Lord Minot, with a recital by violinist Albert Chamberland and pianist Ellen Ballon.
- 1908 Appointment of Harry Crane Perrin, organist of Canterbury Cathedral, as professor and director.
- 1908 McGill's first university symphonic ensemble is created.
- 1911 Charles Henry Mills receives the first DMus degree, for composition.
- 1917 Endowment through a generous gift from Sir William Macdonald permitting the establishment of a faculty of music.

=== Faculty of Music and Conservatorium of Music (1957–1989) ===
- 1964 Helmut Blume named dean of the Faculty of Music. He served until 1979 and oversaw the school's early development into one of Canada's major music schools.
- 1966 The McGill Conservatorium of Music becomes the McGill Preparatory School of Music.
- 1970 The two institutions were separated but remained under the same direction until 1978.
- 1971 Both institutions moved to the Royal Victoria College, which was renovated and renamed the Strathcona Music Building.
- 1978 The Preparatory School becomes the McGill Conservatory of Music.
- 1981 McGill becomes the first university in Canada to offer a BMus degree in jazz performance.
- 1989 The McGill Opera Studio is renamed Opera McGill, with Bernard Turgeon as director and Timothy Vernon as conductor.

=== School renamed – new building ===
- 2005 The New Music Building is opened, and the Faculty of Music changes its name to the Schulich School of Music of McGill University.
- 2010 Inaugural season of the McGill International String Quartet Academy.

== Degrees and programs ==
=== Performance ===
==== Undergraduate Programs in Performance ====
- Bachelor of Music (BMus) in Early Music (Instruments and Voice), Faculty Program (Jazz or Classical), Guitar, Jazz (Instruments and Voice), Orchestral Instruments (Brass, Percussion, Strings, Woodwinds), Organ, Piano, Voice
- Licentiate in Music (LMus) in Early Music (Instruments and Voice), Guitar, Jazz (Instruments and Voice), Orchestral Instruments (Brass, Percussion, Strings, Woodwinds), Organ, Piano, Voice

Double Majors and Double Degree

Bachelor of Music students can add a second major or degree to their program, either within the School of Music or at other faculties at McGill University

Music Performance Minors

- Early Music
- Conducting
- Jazz Arranging and Composition
- Jazz Performance
- In addition to Music minors, B.Mus. students can add minors offered by other faculties at McGill University

==== Graduate Programs in Performance ====
- Master of Music (MMus) in Conducting, Early Music (Instruments and Voice), Guitar, Jazz (instruments and Voice), Orchestral Instruments (Brass, Percussion, Strings, Woodwinds), Organ, Piano, Collaborative Piano, Voice and Opera
- Graduate Diploma in Performance and Artist Diploma in Early Music (Instruments and Voice), Guitar, Jazz (Instruments and Voice), Orchestral Instruments (Brass, Percussion, Strings, Woodwinds), Organ, Piano, Voice and Opera
- Graduate Certificate in Choral Conducting
- Doctor of Music (DMus) in Performance Studies (Brass, Conducting, Early Music, Guitar, Jazz, Organ, Percussion, Piano, Strings, Voice and Opera, Woodwinds)

=== Music research ===
==== Undergraduate Programs in Music Research ====
- Bachelor of Music (BMus) in Composition, Faculty Program (Classical or Jazz), Music Education, Music History/Musicology, Music Theory

Double Majors and Double Degree

Bachelor of Music students can add a second major or degree to their program, either within the School of Music or at other faculties at McGill University

Music Research Minors

- Composition
- Music Education
- Music Entrepreneurship
- Music History / Musicology
- Musical Applications of Technology
- Music Science and Technology
- Music Theory
- In addition to Music minors, B.Mus. students can add minors offered by other faculties at McGill University

==== Graduate Programs in Music Research ====
- Master of Music (MMus) in Composition, Sound Recording
- Master of Arts (MA) in Music Education, Music History/Musicology, Music Technology, Music Theory
- Doctor of Music (DMus) in Composition
- Doctor of Philosophy (PhD) in Composition, Music Education, Musicology, Music Technology, Music Theory, Sound Recording

== Performing ensembles ==
=== Orchestras ===
- McGill Symphony Orchestra (MGSO)
- Contemporary Music Ensemble (CME)
- McGill Wind Orchestra
- Baroque Orchestra
- McGill Schoenberg Ensemble
- Beethoven Orchestra

=== Jazz ===
- McGill Jazz Orchestra I
- McGill Jazz Orchestra II
- McGill Chamber Jazz Ensemble
- Jazz Rhythm Section Ensembles
- McGill Jazz Choir
- Jazz Combos

=== Choral ===
- McGill University Chorus
- Schulich Singers
- McGill Camerata
- Cappella Antica

=== Opera McGill ===
Opera McGill was described by Opera Canada magazine as "the premiere program in Canada." Every year, Opera McGill produces at least three operas on the Pollack Hall stage. It collaborates with the Early Music Program at Schulich to produce a baroque opera (accompanied by period instruments and in period tunings). In 2016, the program celebrated its 60th anniversary.

=== Other ===
- Chamber Music
- Early Music Ensembles
- Song Interpretation
- Guitar Ensemble
- Piano Ensembles
- Percussion Ensemble
- Tabla Ensemble

== Facilities ==
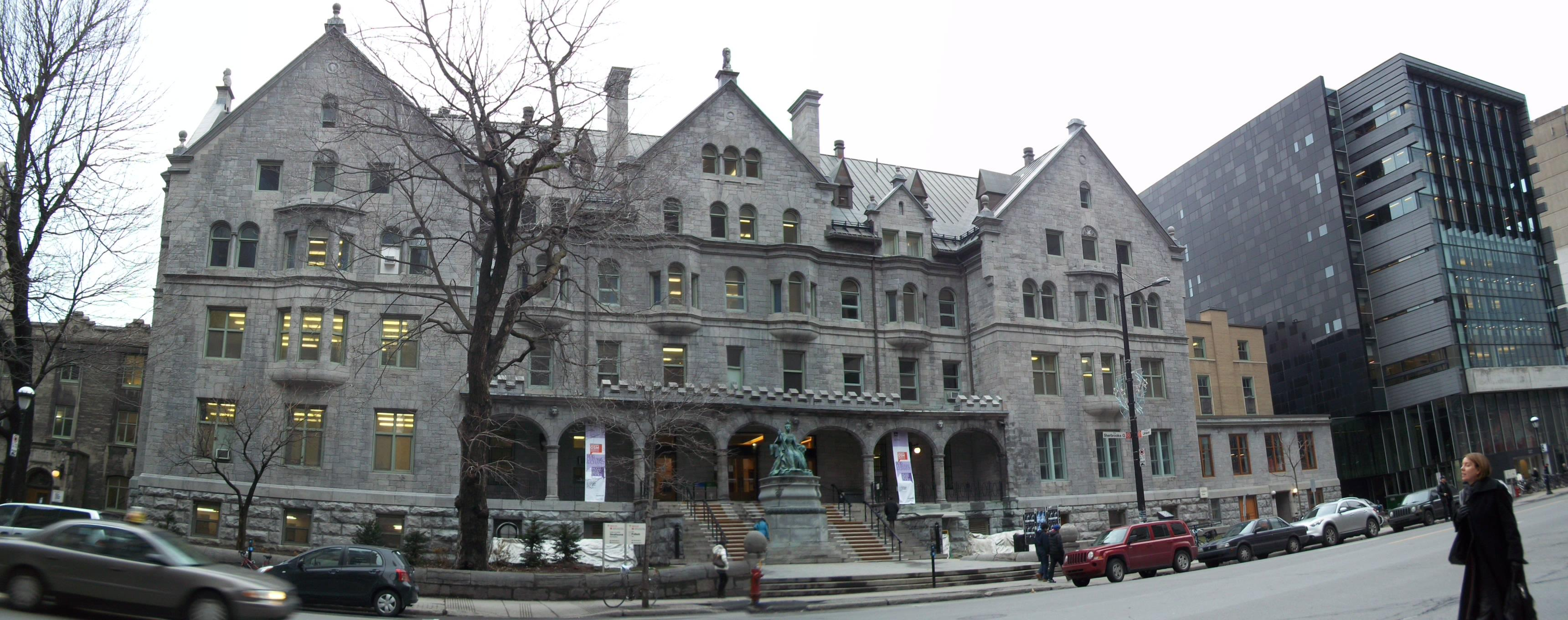
The Strathcona Music Building (at left) and the Elizabeth Wirth Music Building (at right)

The Schulich School of Music has two main buildings on campus – the Strathcona Music Building and the Elizabeth Wirth Music Building.

The Strathcona Music Building was originally home to Royal Victoria College, the women's college of McGill University. Presently, the building has two wings – referred to as the Center Wing and the East Wing. The Center Wing is home to a concert hall (Pollack Hall), a small recital hall (Clara Lichenstein Recital Hall), a large lecture room, teaching studios, classrooms and ensemble rehearsal spaces. Pollack Hall is the largest performance venue at the Schulich School of Music with over 600 seats. The East Wing is situated in the middle of the Center Wing of the Stracona Music Building and the New Music Building. The basement of the East Wing is home to the Music Undergraduate Students' Association office, the students' newspaper office (The Phonograph) and a student cafeteria. The second, third, four and fifth floors house the teaching assistants' offices and the practice rooms for instrumentalists, pianists and vocalists.

The Elizabeth Wirth Music Building (EWMB; previously the New Music Building) was built in 2005 thanks to a $20 million gift from McGill grad Seymour Schulich. The building has 8 floors above ground and two below ground. The bottom floor is known as -2 (minus 2) and is home to the Wirth Opera Studio (named after Manfred and Eliza Wirth), the Music Multimedia Room (MMR) as well as smaller recording studios. The first floor is home to a spacious lobby. On the first and the second floor are entrances to Tanna Schulich Hall, an intimate performance venue which seats 187 people. The third, fourth and fifth floor of the EWMB are home to the Marvin Duchow Music Library. The Gertrude Whitley Performance Library and the Music Student Computer Room, which was updated during the fall of 2008, can also be found on the fifth floor. The sixth floor is reserved for faculty office spaces. The seventh floor is the home of the Schulich School of Music administration, and the 8th floor is home to CIRMMT. On April 30, 2015, the building was officially inaugurated as the Elizabeth Wirth Music Building, thanks to a donation of $7.5 million from McGill alumna Elizabeth Wirth.

Recitals and concerts are also frequently held at Redpath Hall on McGill University's main campus.

The Schulich School of Music occupies 148,650 sq. ft. of space. This includes:

- 113 practice rooms
- 13 classrooms
- 10 ensemble rooms
- Four performing halls: Pollack Hall, Redpath Hall, Tanna Schulich Hall, Clara Lichtenstein Hall
- A state-of-the-art Music Multimedia Room
- Wirth Opera Studio
- The Marvin Duchow Music Library
- The Centre for Interdisciplinary Research in Music Media and Technology (CIRMMT)

817 instruments are available for student use at the Schulich School of Music. This includes:

- 117 pianos
- 55 electric pianos
- 160 percussions
- 485 woodwind, brass and string instruments

== Centre for Interdisciplinary Research in Music Media and Technology ==
The Centre for Interdisciplinary Research in Music Media and Technology is known as CIRMMT. CIRMMT is a multi-disciplinary research Centre involving researchers at McGill University and other institutions. The Centre has research labs in New Music Building. The Centre's research axes are:

- Instruments, devices and systems
- Music information research
- Cognition, perception and movement
- Expanded musical practice

== Reputation ==
University rankings

World rankings
- QS World: 13

Canadian rankings
- QS National: 1

It has consistently ranked as the 1st ranked music school in Canada historically and was ranked 14th globally according to the 2025 QS World University Rankings.

== Notable people ==
=== Alumni ===
- Ayal Adler, Israeli composer
- Lydia Ainsworth, composer, producer and singer
- Peter Allen, Canadian composer, organist, and keyboard player
- Tom Allen, broadcaster, concert host, trombonist
- István Anhalt, Hungarian-Canadian composer
- Darcy James Argue, jazz composer and bandleader
- Julian Armour, cellist and artistic director
- Jeannette Aster, Austrian opera director
- David Atkinson, Canadian baritone and New York Broadway actor/singer
- Burt Bacharach, Grammy and Academy award-winning composer, songwriter, record producer, and pianist
- Ellen Ballon, classical pianist
- Jill Beck, American dancer, scholar, administrator and educator, former president of Lawrence University
- Annesley Black, composer
- Paul Bley, jazz pianist
- Joyce Borenstein, director and animator
- Alexander Brott, Canadian conductor, composer, violinist and music teacher, founded and directed the McGill Chamber Orchestra
- Donna Brown, Canadian soprano opera singer
- Taylor Brook, composer and musician
- Boris Brott, Canadian conductor and composer
- Suad Bushnaq, Jordanian-Canadian film and concert composer
- Peter Butterfield, Canadian conductor and classical tenor, director of the Victoria Philharmonic Choir
- Rufus Cappadocia, Canadian-American cellist
- Rihab Chaieb, Tunisian-Canadian mezzo-soprano
- Albert Chamberland, Canadian violinist, composer, conductor, music producer, and music educator
- Régine Chassagne, singer, songwriter, musician, multi-instrumentalist, and member of Arcade Fire
- Alcée Chriss III, American organist, composer and conductor
- John Austin Clark, American music director and keyboardist, founder and current director of Bourbon Baroque
- Francis Coleman, conductor and television producer and director
- Jonathan Crow, Toronto Symphony Orchestra concertmaster
- Pauline Donalda, Canadian operatic soprano
- Marvin Duchow, composer, teacher and musicologist, expert on Renaissance music and the music of eighteenth century France
- Efajemue, Canadian Jazz drummer and producer
- José Evangelista, Spanish composer and music educator
- Clifford Ford, composer, editor, music educator, and author
- Karina Gauvin, Canadian soprano
- Serban Ghenea, 19 Grammy Awards and three Latin Grammy Awards winning audio engineer and mixer
- Estelí Gomez, multiple Grammy award-winning American musician
- Chilly Gonzales, Grammy award-winning pianist and singer
- Donna Grantis, Canadian guitarist, known for work with Prince & 3rdeyegirl
- Helga Rut Guðmundsdóttir, professor of music education at the University of Iceland
- Caity Gyorgy, Juno award-winning jazz singer
- Sinjin Hawke, Canadian-American electronic music producer and DJ
- Larry Henderson, broadcaster, actor, news anchor, writer
- Timothy L. Jackson, American professor of music theory at University of North Texas
- Kelly Jefferson, jazz saxophonist
- Christine Jensen, Juno Award-winning composer, conductor, and saxophonist
- Alessandro Juliani, Canadian actor and singer
- Gillian Keith, soprano
- Richard King, multi Grammy award-winning recording engineer
- Veronika Krausas, composer
- Jimmie LeBlanc, Canadian composer and guitarist
- Caroline Leonardelli, French concert harpist
- Jens Lindemann, trumpet soloist
- Earl MacDonald, director of Jazz Studies at the University of Connecticut, former musical director and pianist with Maynard Ferguson
- Martin MacDonald, resident conductor with Symphony Nova Scotia
- Don McGowan, television personality at CFCF-DT
- Charles Henry Mills, English-American composer and director of the University of Wisconsin–Madison School of Music
- Robin Minard, composer and installation artist
- Simon Morrison, scholar and writer specializing in 20th-century music
- Dorothy Morton, pianist and instructor
- Geoffrey Moull, music director of the Thunder Bay Symphony Orchestra, mentor of the Opera Program at Wilfrid Laurier University
- Natasha Negovanlis, actress, writer, producer, and singer
- John Oliver, composer and organist
- Charles O'Neill, Canadian bandmaster, composer, organist, cornetist, and music educator
- Donald Patriquin, Canadian composer, organist, and choral conductor
- Michel Perrault, composer, conductor, music educator, and percussionist
- Mauro Pezzente, co-founder of Godspeed You! Black Emperor
- Eldon Rathburn, Canadian film composer who scored over 250 films
- Jay Reise, American composer
- Charles Richard-Hamelin, concert pianist
- Matthew Ricketts, classical composer
- Susan Rogers, American professor, sound engineer and record producer, professor of music at Berklee College of Music
- Michael Sackler-Berner, American songwriter, recording artist, guitarist, singer and actor
- Elizabeth Shepherd, singer, songwriter, pianist and producer
- Robert Silverman, Canadian pianist and piano pedagogue
- Philippe Sly, bass-baritone and opera, oratorio and recital singer
- Marguerita Spencer, Canadian pianist, organist, composer and educator
- Grant Stewart, Canadian jazz saxophonist
- Donald Steven, composer, Juno Award for Classical Composition of the Year, Jules Léger Prize for New Chamber Music
- Nora Sourouzian, Armenian-Canadian mezzo-soprano
- Alexandra Stréliski, neo-classical composer and pianist
- Sylvia Sweeney, Canadian executive television producer and Olympian
- Daniel Taylor, countertenor, director of the Theatre of Early Music, adjunct professor at the Schulich School of Music
- Kristan Toczko, harpist
- Maja Trochimczyk, American music historian, writer and poet
- Robert Turner, Canadian composer, radio producer, and music educator
- Gino Vannelli, rock singer and songwriter
- Frédérique Vézina, soprano
- Rufus Wainwright, singer, songwriter, pianist, and composer
- Ella May Walker, composer and organist
- Alfred Whitehead, English-born Canadian composer, organist, choirmaster, music educator, painter
- Nina C. Young, American electro-acoustic composer of contemporary classical music

=== Current and past faculty members ===
- István Anhalt, Hungarian-Canadian composer
- Andrew Dawes, Canadian violinist
- Alfred De Sève, Canadian violinist, composer, and music educator
- Claude Champagne, French Canadian composer, teacher, pianist, and violinist
- Douglas Clarke, English organist, conductor, composer and academic, conductor of the Montreal Orchestra
- Ira Coleman, French-American jazz bassist
- Steven Epstein, 16 Grammy Award-winning American record producer
- Marina Goglidze-Mdivani, professor of piano
- Matt Haimovitz, professor of strings and cello
- Melissa Hui, Chinese-Canadian composer and pianist
- Oliver Jones, jazz pianist, organist, composer and arranger
- Michael Laucke, classical, new flamenco and flamenco guitarist and composer
- Suzie LeBlanc, soprano and professor of voice
- Michel Donato, Canadian jazz double bass player, composer, and singer and pianist
- Daniel Levitin, American-Canadian cognitive psychologist, neuroscientist, writer, musician, and record producer
- Bengt Hambraeus, Swedish organist, composer and musicologist
- William Caplin, American music theorist, former president of the Society for Music Theory
- Theodore Baskin, Principal Oboe of the Montreal Symphony Orchestra
- Charles A. E. Harriss, English impresario, educator, organist-choirmaster and conductor, founding director of the McGill Conservatorium of Music (today the Schulich School of Music)
- Brian Jackson, British-Canadian conductor, organist and pianist
- Kelsey Jones, Canadian composer, pianist, harpsichordist, and music teacher
- Alcides Lanza, Argentinian composer, conductor, pianist, and music educator
- Hugh Le Caine, Canadian physicist, composer, and instrument builder
- Philippe Leroux, French composer
- Clara Lichtenstein, Hungarian pianist
- Camille Thurman, American jazz musician, composer, and member of the Jazz at Lincoln Center Orchestra
- Rémi Bolduc, Canadian jazz saxophonist, bandleader and composer
- John Rea, composer, former dean of the Schulich School of Music of McGill University
- Kent Nagano, American conductor, opera administrator, and ex-conductor of the Montreal Symphony Orchestra
- Kenneth Gilbert, Canadian harpsichordist, organist, musicologist, and music educator
- Ellen Ballon, classical pianist
- George Massenburg, multiple Grammy Award-winning recording engineer and inventor
- Bruce Mather, Canadian composer, pianist, and writer
- Paul Pedersen, composer, arts administrator, and music educator
- Harry Crane Perrin, British cathedral organist and academic, served as the first dean of music at McGill University
- Alexis Hauser, Austrian conductor
- Jan Simons, Canadian baritone, music teacher and administrator
- Axel Strauss, German violinist
- Sanford Sylvan, American Baritone
- Socalled, Canadian rapper and record producer
- Joel Quarrington, Canadian double bass player, soloist, teacher, and the former Principal Double Bass of the London Symphony Orchestra
- Richard King, multi Grammy award-winning recording engineer
- John Hollenbeck, American jazz drummer and composer known for his work with The Claudia Quintet and Bob Brookmeyer
- Geoffrey Moull, music director of the Thunder Bay Symphony Orchestra, mentor of the Opera Program at Wilfrid Laurier University
- Christopher Jackson, Canadian organist, harpsichordist and choral conductor
- Denys Bouliane, Canadian composer and conductor
- Boris Brott, Canadian conductor and composer
- Brian Cherney, Canadian composer
- Lina Pizzolongo, vocal coach and concert pianist
- Raymond Daveluy, composer, organist, music educator, and arts administrator
- Charles Reiner, Hungarian-Canadian pianist
- Arthur Romano, Italian-Canadian saxophonist, oboist, and english hornist

=== History of Deans ===
- Clara Lichtenstein 1886 - 1904
- Charles A. E. Harriss 1904 - 1920
- Harry Crane Perrin 1920 - 1930
- Douglas Clarke 1930 - 1955
- Marvin Duchow 1955 - 1963
- Helmuth Blume 1963 - 1976
- Paul Pedersen 1976 - 1986
- John Rea 1986 - 1991
- John Grew 1991 - 1996
- Richard Lawton 1996 - 2001
- Don McLean 2001 - 2010
- Gordon Foote 2010 - 2011
- Sean Ferguson 2011 - 2016
- Brenda Ravenscroft 2016 - 2022
- Sean Ferguson 2022 - Present

== Special events and conferences ==
- During the 2015-2016 concert season, the Schulich School of Music put on over 700 performances.
- For 30 years, the McGill/CBC concert series has delivered music to audiences across Canada. It is reported to be the longest university/radio concert series in Canadian history.

== Photo gallery ==
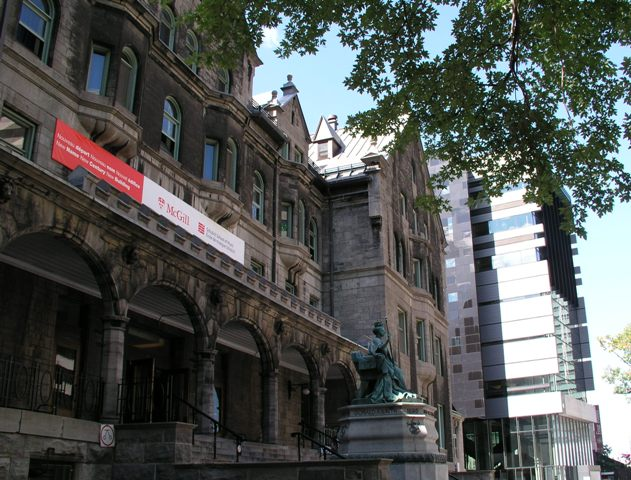
The Strathcona Music Building (foreground) was built in 1901; a new music building (background) was opened in 2005.

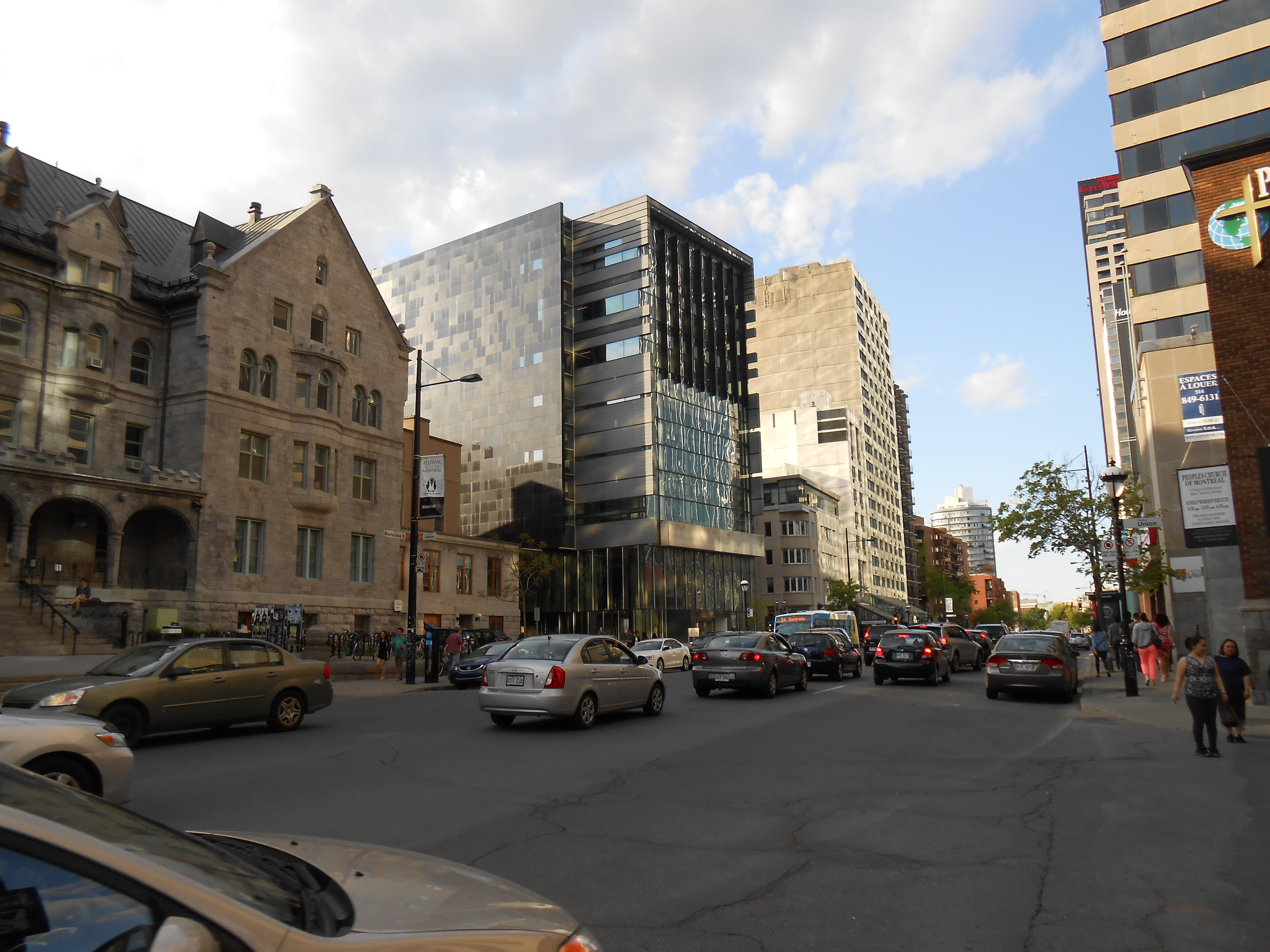
McGill faculty Music department

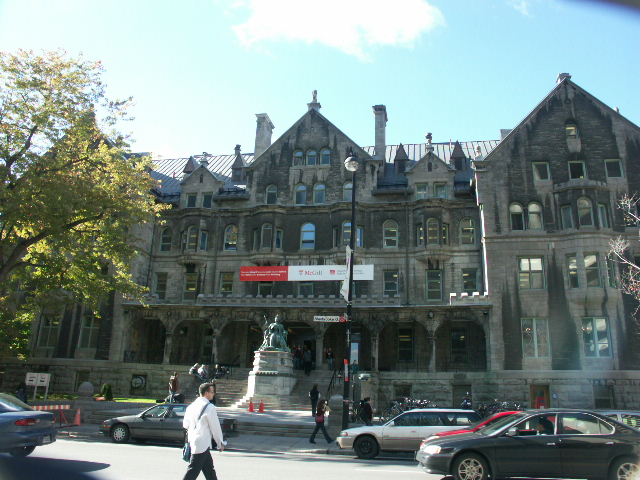
Strathcona music building (McGill University) 2005-10-21

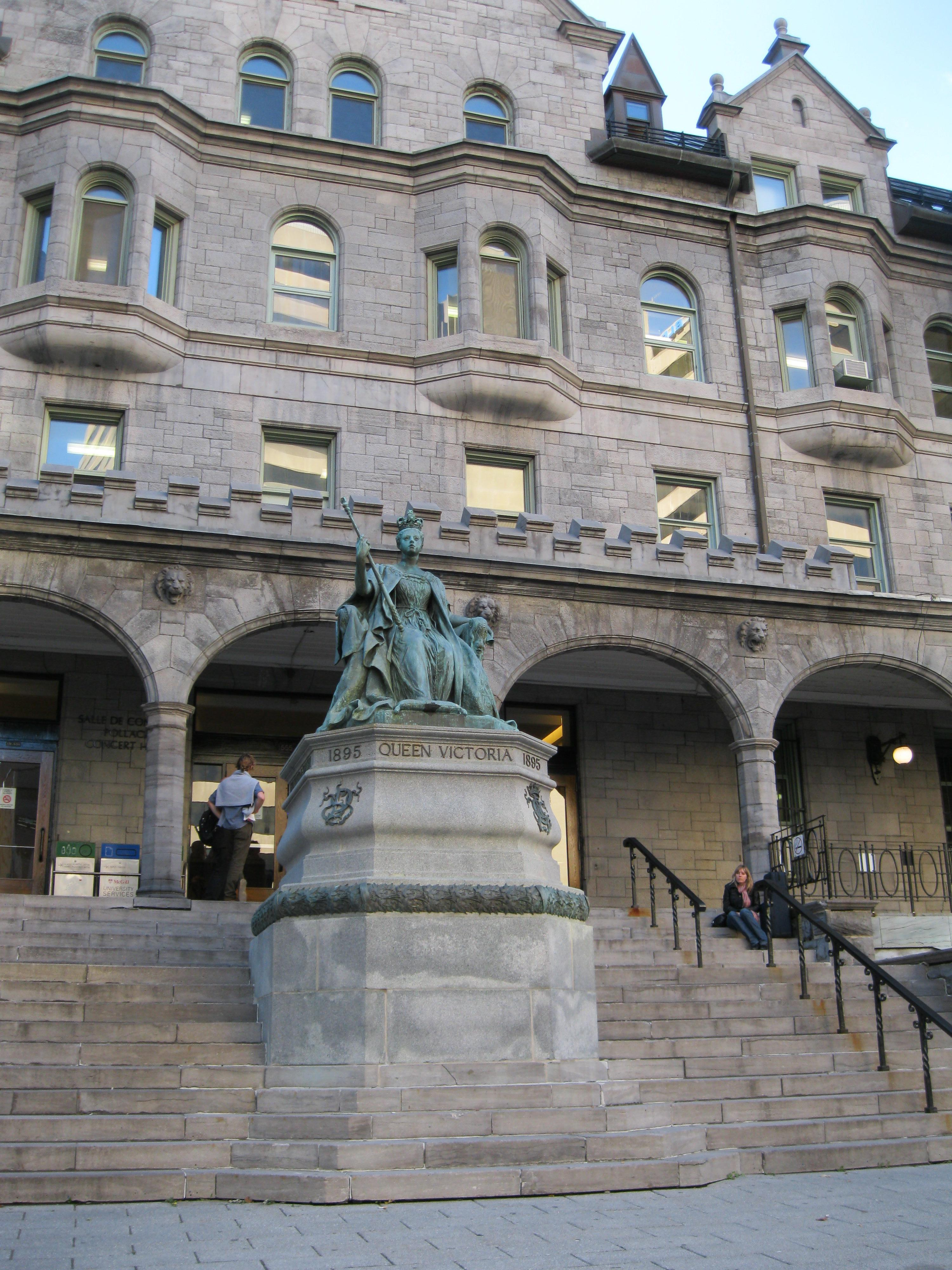
A statue of Queen Victoria sits outside the Strathcona Music Building.

== See also ==
- McGill University
- Seymour Schulich
