= Rose Goldblatt =

Canadian administrator, pianist and teacher (1913–1997)

Rose Goldblatt FRSA
- Born: August 28, 1913; Montreal, Quebec, Canada
- Died: September 30, 1997 (aged 84); Montreal, Quebec, Canada
- Education: Canadian Academy of Music; Royal College of Music
- Occupations: Administrator; Pianist; Teacher
- Spouse: Henry Finkel
- Children: 2

Rose Goldblatt FRSA (August 28, 1913 – September 30, 1997) was a Canadian administrator, pianist and teacher. She made her professional debut in Montreal in 1927 and then had her European debut eight years later. Goldblatt performed on radio, featured on recordings by the CBC and taught music at the Faculty of Music at McGill University from 1955 to 1978. She was made a Fellow of the Royal Society of Arts in 1987 and an annual award presented by the Quebec Music Teachers' Association was named for her.

== Biography ==
On August 28, 1913, Goldblatt was born in Montreal. She was the daughter of a schoolteacher. In 1918, Goldblatt commenced piano studies under Boris Dunev and Arthur Letondal at Montreal's Canadian Academy of Music. At age six, she gave her first public recital at the Windsor Hotel, before continuing her studies under Stanley Gardner in 1922. Five years later, Goldblatt made her professional debut in Montreal. In 1929, Goldblatt earned a five-year Strathcona scholarship to study at the Royal College of Music in London from 1930 to 1935. She learnt piano with Kendall Taylor, theory with Harold Craxton and composition with Patrick Hadley.

Her European concert debut came at the Royal College of Music in London in June 1935, and also performed in the ballroom of the Ritz-Carlton Montreal that October. Goldblatt went on to study with Busoni disciple Egon Petri in New York. During this time, the Ladies' Morning Musical Club gave her the Cécile Léger Scholarship. Goldblatt went back to Montreal in 1937. She performed on radio for several decades and was a soloist with the CBC Symphony Orchestra, the Little Symphony of Montreal, the McGill Chamber Orchestra, and the Montreal Women's Symphony Orchestra. Goldblatt also appeared on CBC TV's L'Heure du Concert, and with Gardner gave two piano recitals. She toured the Eastern United States, where she performed at The Town Hall in New York, the Kimball Hall in Chicago and other places. Goldblatt introduced many Canadian music and works to audiences in North America such as Violet Archer, István Anhalt, Wolfgang Bottenberg, Alexander Brott, Albertine Caron-Legris, Maurice Dela, Marvin Duchow, George Fiala and Hector Gratton.

From 1955 to 1956, she presented the CBC teenage radio program Piano Party, and also had her own program on WNYC in New York. Goldblatt was a teacher of music at the Faculty of Music at McGill University between 1955 and 1978. She was co-coordinator of local centres for the McGill preparatory school from 1956 to 1977. In 1965, Goldblatt was appointed chair of McGill University's Keyboard Department and kept the position until she retired in 1978. From 1942, she was part of the Quebec Music Teachers' Association (QMTA), serving as president of its association between 1983 and 1985 before becoming its provincial council president from 1987 to 1989. In 1986, as part of the International Year of Canadian Music, Goldblatt organized a symphoium of Canadian composers. The following year, she was made a Fellow of the Royal Society of Arts.

Five years later, she was elected Quebec vice-president of the Canadian Federation of Music Teachers' Associations. Goldblatt featured on recordings by the CBC, playing the music of Walter Kaufmann, Otto Joachim and Oskar Morawetz. She performed Josef Fiala's Concertino, with Roland Leduc conducting the CBC Montreal string orchestra, Louis Charbonneau at timpani and Jacques LeComte at trumpet. She was featured on Radio-Canada's recording Fantasy on a Hebrew Theme, performing Joseph Joachim's Éclosion and the title selection by Oskar Morawetz. She consulted the Quebec Music Festivals, served as Canadian correspondent for the European Piano Teacher's Association and was Canada's representative for the International Society for the Study of Tension in Performance.

== Personal life ==
She married the industrial designer Henry Finkel in 1937. They had two children (a son and daughter). Goldblatt died of cancer in Montreal on September 30, 1997.

== Legacy ==
The QMTA setup the Rose Goldblatt Trophy in 1991 and the award is presented annually "to a deserving student".
