= Caroline Leonardelli =

French-Canadian harpist (born 1965)

Caroline Leonardelli Caroline Léonardelli
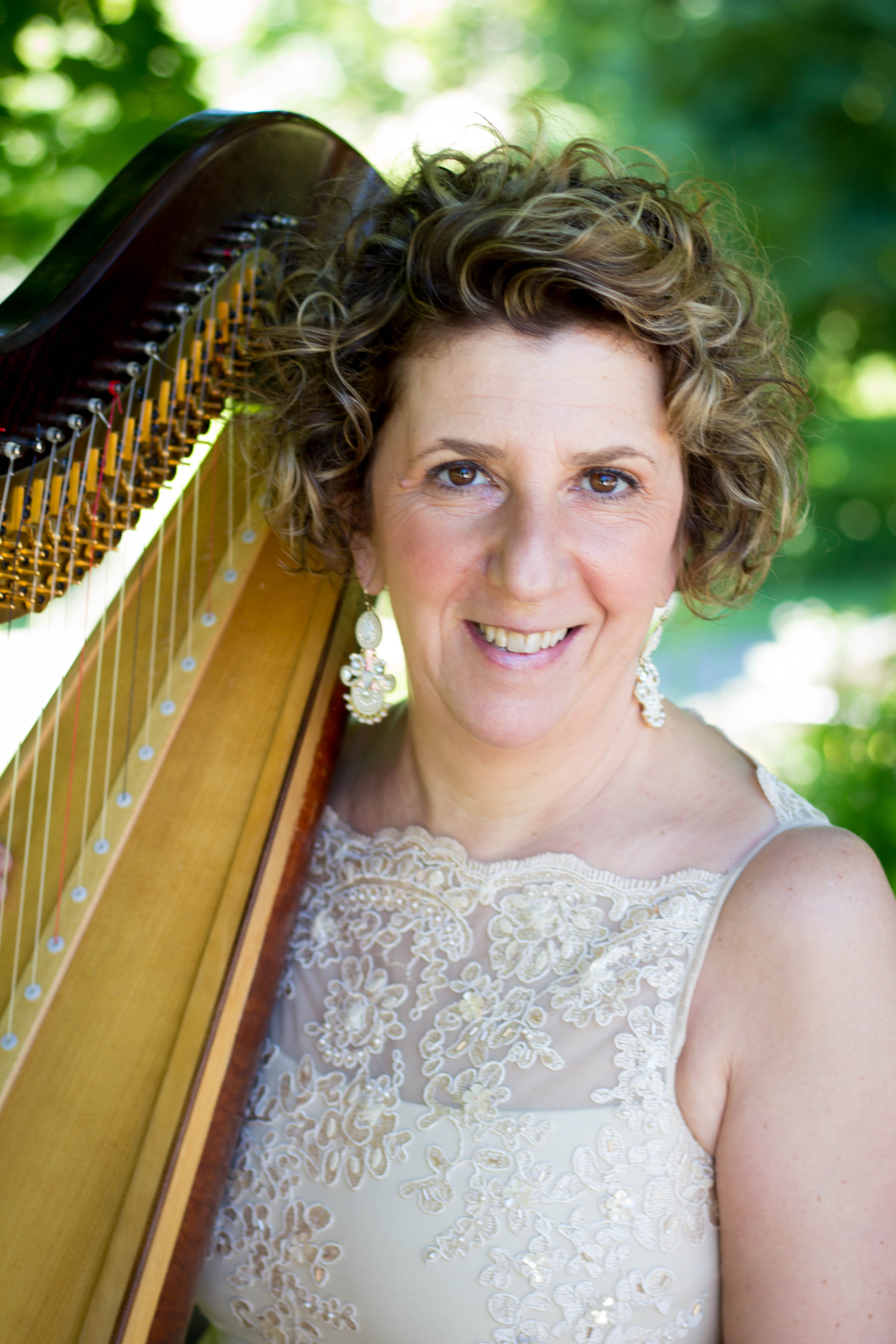
- Caroline Léonardelli

Background information
- Born: March 10, 1965 (age 61); Navarrenx, France
- Genres: Classical; chamber music
- Instrument: Pedal Harp
- Label: CENCLASSICS
- Website: www.carolineleonardelli.com

Caroline Léonardelli (born March 10, 1965) is a French-Canadian concert harpist. Born in France, she graduated from the Conservatoire de Paris (Paris Conservatory) at age of 18 and came to Canada to study at McGill University where she completed an Artist Diploma. Based in Canada's National Capital Region, she performs for CBC national broadcasts and for Radio Canada. Her recordings are featured by Apple Music in the top ten playlist of master harp recordings and her recording label is distributed worldwide by NAXOS. She is the Principal Harpist with the Ottawa Symphony and Orchestre symphonique de Gatineau.

== Life and career ==
=== Training and education ===
Leonardelli was born in Navarrenx, France began to study the classical harp in France at the age of seven at the Conservatoire de Pau in southwestern France. She also studied with Lily Laskine during this time. At 14, she was invited to study at the Conservatoire de Paris (Paris Conservatory) in the class of Jacqueline Borot where she graduated with first prize in harp at age of 18. She continued her studies with Judy Loman at the Schulich School of Music at McGill University where she completed an Artist Diploma.

=== Broadcasts and recordings ===
Leonardelli is a classical harpist who performs for CBC national broadcasts and for Radio Canada. Her recordings include: Panache with mezzo-soprano Julie Nesrallah, Impressionism by the Para Arpa harp duo, A Conte de Noel, Musique de salons en Bretagne for Radio Canada, and Ceremony of Carols by Benjamin Britten, with the Ottawa Board of Education Central Choirs under the direction of Barbara Clark. Leonardelli's solo recording El Dorado received a Juno nomination for Classical Album of the Year - Solo or Chamber Ensemble. The recording featured compositions by Canadian composer Marjan Mozetich.

Leonardelli's solo recording Impressions de France is featured by Apple Music in the top ten playlist of master harp recordings. Her artist-owned recording label is distributed worldwide by NAXOS. She has been described as a "World Class Harpist" in Harp Column Magazine, and her live performances have been reviewed as "Brilliant" and "Outstanding". A review of her Impressions de France recording: stated that "What she brings or adds to the music at hand, to any piece she plays, is close to magical" and "[s]he sees beyond the notes and recreates what the composer had in mind"

=== Chamber music ===
She is a member of several chamber ensembles including a harp quartet with harpists Jennifer Swartz, Lori Gems and Caroline Lizotte, Para Arpa harp duo with Caroline Lizotte, and a harp/vocal duo with mezzo-soprano Julie Nesrallah. Caroline has performed in ensembles at numerous chamber festivals.

=== Choral work ===
Choral work is a passion for Leonardelli, who has performed a wide range of repertoire with numerous choral ensembles. The 2005 Evergreen Wishes CBC produced concert of the Ottawa Children's Choir and Leonardelli performing John Rutter's Dancing Day received a Gabriel Award.

=== Orchestral roles ===
Leonardelli is the Principal Harpist with the Ottawa Symphony and Orchestre symphonique de Gatineau. She has also performed with the Montreal Symphony, the Quebec Symphony, the Kitchener-Waterloo Symphony, the Orchestra London Canada, Symphony Nova Scotia, and the Opera Lyra in Ottawa.

=== Teaching ===
Leonardelli teaches at her private studio of harp students, including her Lyra Angelica harp ensembles. Leonardelli was head of the harp ensemble program at the Ottawa Youth Orchestra for 20 years.

== Discography ==
- Serenata - Italian Solo Harp - solo harp
- Un Sospiro - Italian Art Songs - Leonardelli, Julie Nesrallah
- Noel Nouvelet - Leonardelli, Julie Nesrallah and keyboardist Matthew Larkin
- Impressions de France - solo harp
- Legendes - harp and organ - Leonardelli, harp and Matthew Larkin, organ
- El Dorado - solo harp with double bassist Joel Quarrington and the Penderecki String Quartet - nominated Juno Award for Classical Album of the Year - Solo or Chamber Ensemble
- Panache - Voice and harp (with Julie Nesrallah, mezzo-soprano)
- A Christmas Story (with Ottawa Bach Choir, directed by Dr. Lisette Canton)
- Impressionisme Para Arpa Harp duo Leonardelli & Caroline Lizotte
