= John Austin Clark =

Music director - keyboards

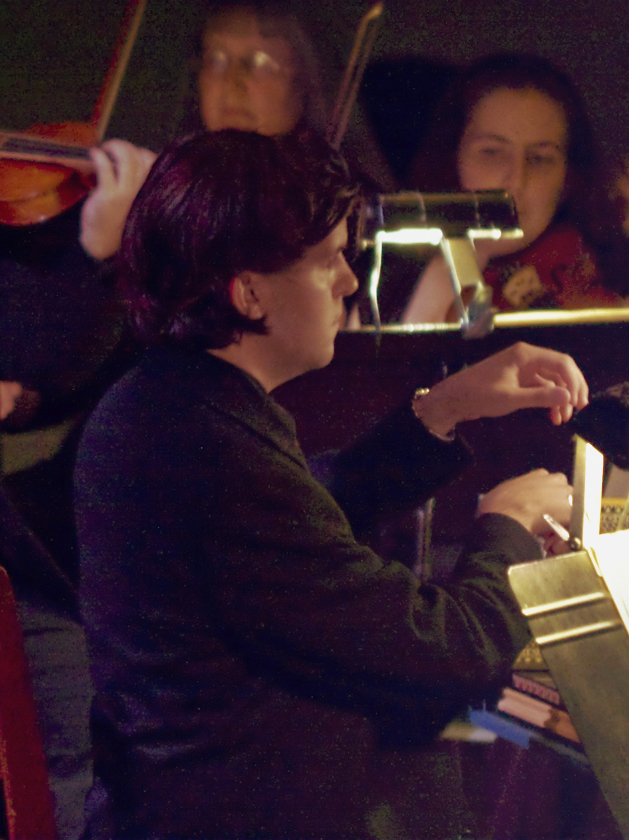
- John Austin Clark in 2008
- Born: June 26, 1982 (age 44); Louisville, Kentucky
- Musical career
- Genres: Early music; classical; musical
- Instruments: harpsichord; piano; organ; fortepiano; voice
- Label: Centaur
- Website: Official website

John Austin Clark (born 26 June 1982 in Louisville, Kentucky) is an American music director and keyboardist. He plays piano and historical keyboards, including harpsichord, organ and fortepiano. He is a founder and current director of Bourbon Baroque.

== Early life and education ==
Clark was born in Louisville, Kentucky, where he was a choir boy before he began taking piano lessons at the age of 7. He continued to study the piano during his attendance of Louisville Collegiate School. As highschool freshman, he was deeply influenced by singing with the Louisville Bach Society. Performing in several highschool musical productions was another defining influence. He enrolled in the Kentucky Center Governor's School for the Arts Vocal Music program in 2000. In 2001 Clark started to explore ways of using his art to give back to the community, by asking his recital audience to donate for charity. He applied to Oberlin College Conservatory of Music as a voice major, and was accepted after focusing on the harpsichord as his main instrument and received his Bachelor of Music degree in music education. During his time at Oberlin he envisioned to return to Louisville to start a professional baroque group, but first continued his studies in Montreal at the McGill University with Luc Beauséjour and earned his Master of Music degree in harpsichord performance.

== Career ==
In 2007, Clark co-founded the early music and historically informed performance ensemble Bourbon Baroque with violinist and professor of French Nicolas Fortin, who he had met at McGill. Together with Fortin, Clark was artistic director for Bourbon Baroque. Their biggest productions together included Don Quichotte auf der Hochzeit des Comacho by Telemann with Kentucky Opera in 2008, Handel's Alcina in 2010, Rameau's Les Sauvages from Les Indes galantes with Squallis Puppeteers in 2012, and Purcell's Dido and Aeneas in 2015. Clark moved to New York City in 2015, where he explored directing musical theatre. Fortin and Clark continued working together at Bourbon Baroque till Fortin's tragic death in the fall of 2016. Shortly after, Clark briefly returned to Louisville for Handel's complete Messiah, an annual performance he and Fortin had established in 2013 as a Louisville holiday tradition. Clark called the Messiah a wonderful piece and a universal message of love and hope that would be therapy for him and people that were touched by Nicolas Fortin. In June 2017, Clark was joined by violinist Alice Culin-Ellison as Bourbon Baroque's co-artistic director, and moved back to Louisville.

Clark was musical director and pianist for the 2017 production of Lucas Hnath's play The Christians in Naples, Florida. In the summer of 2017, he played the organ on a studio recording of choral works by Antonio Juanas. The 2018 collaboration between Bourbon Baroque and Louisville Ballet for a Mozart themed ballet production had Clark performing on fortepiano. Also in 2018, Clark was music director for the Commonwealth Theatre production of the musical The 25th Annual Putnam County Spelling Bee. In 2019 Clark was music director for the musicals Cabaret directed by Seth Lieber, and Pippin, directed by Remy Sisk. Clark was music director of the 2020 production of La Cage aux Folles directed by Michael J. Drury. During the COVID-19 pandemic in spring of 2020, Clark performed in a weekly variety show named #governmedaddy Cabaret. In the summer of 2022, Clark began teaching in the musical theatre department at Youth Performing Arts School, where he had previously been an accompanist.

== Awards and recognition ==
Clark is the recipient of the 2017 Young Alumni Achievement Award and a Kentucky Governor's School for the Arts spring 2017 Toyota Alumni Fund Grant, which he used to apprentice with harpsichord builder Yves Beaupré.

== Discography ==
- Antonio Juanas: Premiere Recordings of Selected Choral Works; Collegium Mundi Novi, Variant 6, Conductor: R. Ryan Endris, Organist: John Austin Clark (Centaur/Naxos, 2017, CRC 3663)
