= Leonardelli =

Leonardelli is a French surname. Notable people with the surname include:

- Caroline Leonardelli (born 1965), French-Canadian harpist
- Julien Leonardelli (born 1987), French politician
