= Clara Lichtenstein =

Hungarian-born pianist and educator

- Born: October 21, 1863; Budapest
- Died: May 3, 1946; Swanage, Dorset, England
- Occupation(s): Music educator, pianist

Clara Lichtenstein (October 21, 1863 – May 3, 1946) was a Hungarian-born pianist and educator.

== Early life ==
Lichtenstein was born in Budapest in 1863. Her maternal grandfather was the German singer Traugott Gey, and her uncle was the artist Leonhard Gey.

She studied at the Charlotte Square Institution in Edinburgh, where her uncle George Lichtenstein was a director. In 1880, she performed piano duets with Sir Charles Hallé. She continued her studies at the Royal Academy of Music in Vienna; she is said to have also studied with Liszt around this time.

== Career ==
Following her uncle's death, Lichtenstein became principal of the Charlotte Square Institution. In 1898, she became a member of the Royal Society of Musicians. In 1899, she was invited by Lord Strathcona to organize a music department at the Royal Victoria College (later McGill University) in Montreal. In 1904, she became vice-director and head of staff of the new McGill Conservatorium of Music. She taught piano, voice, music history and music theory until 1929. She also gave public lectures in Montreal.

Her students included Pauline Donalda, Ellen Ballon, Maud Allan, Marguerita Spencer, jazz pianist Max Chamitov, and bass singer Edmund Burke.

== Personal life and legacy ==
Lichtenstein retired to England in 1929, and died in Swanage, Dorset, in 1946, in her eighties. Clara Lichtenstein Hall, a small performance hall at McGill University, was named in her honour. In 1979, as part of the conservatory's 80th anniversary events, pianist Janet Schmalfeldt gave a recital in memory of Clara Lichtenstein, featuring works by Bach, Schubert, Schumann, and Liszt.
