= Kristan Toczko =

Canadian harpist

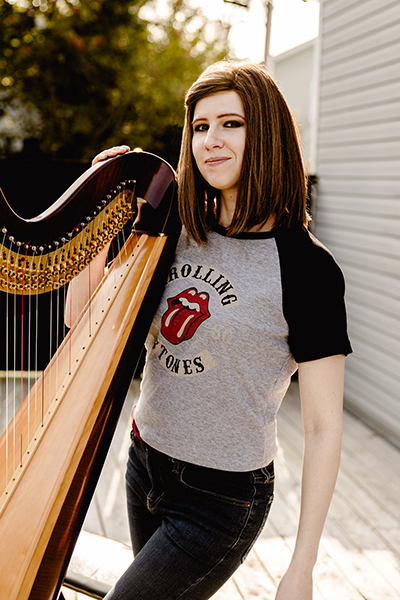

Background information
- Born: May 23, 1988 (age 37)
- Origin: Moncton, New Brunswick, Canada
- Genres: Classical, classical crossover, rock, new-age, heavy metal, pop
- Occupation: Harpist
- Years active: 2000–present
- Labels: Touch Co Records, Leaf Music ULC
- Website: https://www.harpistkt.com

Kristan Toczko (23 May 1988) is a Canadian harpist from Moncton, New Brunswick. She performs classical and crossover music.

== Education ==
Toczko began playing harp at age nine. She majored in harp performance at the Schulich School of Music at McGill University and at the Yale School of Music.

== Career ==
Toczko has performed as a concerto soloist and orchestral performer with orchestras in Canada, the US, and Mexico. She has performed at festivals including the Ottawa Chamberfest, Toronto Summer Music Festival, Rio Harp Festival in Brazil, Aspen Music Festival, Lucerne Festival Academy, and the Banff Centre for Arts and Creativity.

Toczko's recordings cover various genres, including classical, rock, film music, and video game music. Her debut album, Rock Echoes (2024), was listed on the crossover music charts for Billboard.

== Recordings ==
- Zombies Theme (From "Black Ops 2") (2022) (single)
- 'Tis the Season (2022) (EP)
- The Classics: Popular Classical Works for Solo Harp (2022) (EP)
- Jiggle Jiggle (Classical Remix) (2022) (single) (with There I Ruined It)
- They all go 'way – Jackalope Tales (2023) (album) (with Lo & the High Road)
- Memories (2023) (EP)
- Clocks – Coldplay (2023) (single)
- Starlight Horizon (2023) (single)
- Mountain Reverie (2023) (EP)
- Carol of the Bells (2023) (single)
- Drive (2024) (single)
- Rock Echoes (2024) (album)
- Journey to Miklagard (2024) (single) (with Bardr)
- Bitter Bard (2024) (single) (with Bardr)
- Great Fairy Fountain (From "The Legend of Zelda") (2024) (single)
- Prologue (From "Beauty and the Beast") (2024) (single)
- What Was I Made For? – Billie Eilish (2024) (single)
- Reflections on Harp (2024) (album)
- A Thousand Years – Christina Perri (2024) (single) (with Jeremy Tai)
- Fade to Black – Metallica (2024) (single)
- Waves (2024) (EP)
