= Stanley Gardner =

Canadian pianist and music educator

Stanley Gardner (13 December 1890 in Sherbrooke – 17 August 1945 in Montreal) was a Canadian pianist and music educator. As a performer he was best known as one half of a piano duo with Rose Goldblatt with whom he performed in concerts throughout Canada and on Canadian radio from 1936-1945. He also gave solo recitals throughout his native country, and was one of the earliest musicians in Canada to concertize the works of Claude Debussy and Maurice Ravel. He was also a champion of works by living Canadian and American composers.

In his youth, Gardner studied piano with Stratford Dawson in Montreal. In 1912 he went to Berlin to pursue further piano studies with Ferruccio Busoni and Egon Petri. After returning to Montreal, he opened his own private studio from which he taught for several decades. His most well known pupils were Samuel Dolin, Goldblatt, and Dorothy Morton.
