= Fifths tuning =

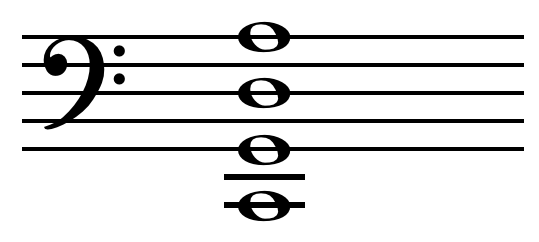
Fifths tuning.

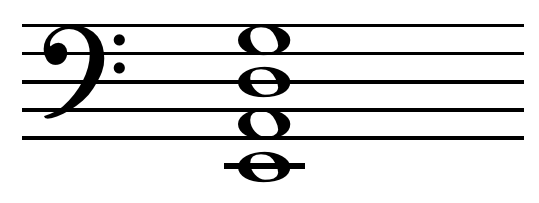
Standard fourths tuning.

Fifths tuning is a non-standard tuning for the double bass, used primarily in classical and jazz music. In this tuning, the double bass is tuned like a cello, but an octave lower (C1-G1-D2-A2, low to high).

Although fifths tuning was once the most common double bass tuning in France in the 19th century, standard fourths tuning (E-A-D-G) has since become the most used tuning for the instrument. Fifths has recently been repopularised by a small number of bassists, most notably American Red Mitchell and Canadian Joel Quarrington.

Its advocates say the advantages of fifths tuning are:

- Increased resonance, volume and quality of sound (the strings have more common overtones, causing the strings to vibrate sympathetically).
- Superior intonation with the rest of the string section due to the uniform tuning (for classical players).
- Best method of obtaining a low C, without an extension or a fifth string.
- Mostly used by jazz players for the major tenth which can be played easily without a position shift.

== See also ==
- Double bass
- Joel Quarrington
- Red Mitchell
- Circle of fifths
- New standard tuning
