= Dorothy Morton (pianist) =

Canadian pianist and music educator (1924–2008)

- Born: Dorothy Breitman; September 17, 1924; Montreal, Quebec, Canada
- Died: September 17, 2008 (aged 84); Montreal, Quebec, Canada
- Education: McGill University, Conservatoire de musique du Québec à Montréal
- Occupation: music teacher
- Spouse: Allan Morton

Dorothy Morton (September 17, 1924 — September 17, 2008) was a Canadian pianist and music teacher.

== Life ==
Born Dorothy Breitman in Montreal, Quebec, she studied piano with Stanley Gardner and then studied music theory and composition at McGill University with Claude Champagne, Violet Archer, Marvin Duchow and Douglas Clarke. Morton went on to study piano at the Conservatoire de musique du Québec à Montréal with Germaine Malépart and Isidor Philipp. She continued taking private lessons with Philipp in New York City. She received a number of grants to pursue further study, including the Delphic Study Club scholarship and the Sarah Fischer Concerts scholarship. She performed on the radio and in concert. With Esther Master, she performed in the piano duo the Morton-Master Duo.

In 1955, she became a teacher at McGill. Her students included James Gelfand, Donald Steven, William Benjamin, Paul Berkowitz, Michel Kozlovsky, Robert Mayerovitch and Robert Silverman. In 1996, she was named a professor emeritus. Morton also served on the faculty of the Orford Arts Centre.

She wrote the chapter on piano for the book Careers in Music: A Guide for Canadian Students (1986).

Morton married Allan Morton.

She died in Montreal at the age of 84.

The Dorothy Morton Visiting Artist Series Concert at McGill University was named in her honour.
