= John Rea (composer) =

Canadian composer (born 1944)

John Rea CM (born 1944) is a Montreal-based composer who won the Jules Léger Prize for New Chamber Music in both 1981 and 1992. He obtained his bachelor's degree at Wayne State University (1967), his Master of Music degree at the University of Toronto (1969), and his PhD at Princeton University. His children's opera The Prisoners Play from 1972 uses serial techniques. His works have been played by the Montreal Symphony Orchestra, the Quebec Symphony Orchestra, the Nouvel Ensemble Moderne, the Arditti Quartet, the Esprit Orchestra and others. He is the previous dean and head of the composition department at the Schulich School of Music of McGill University, from which he has finally taken his retirement. Among his notable students are composers Robin Minard and John Oliver.

== Music ==
Stage:

The Days/Les Jours, ballet. 1969. Ms

The Prisoners Play, opera (Paul Woodruff). 1973. Ms

Com-possession 'Daemonic afterimages in the theatre of transitory states.' 1980. 2 chamber ensemble (tape). Ms. McGill University Records 83019 (Laucke)

Une Fleur du mal. 1992. Sop, clarinet, violoncello and percussion

Canto di Beatrice. 1992. For two sop and two violoncelli, melodrama

Alma & Oskar (melodrama from beyond the grave). 1995. Voice and piano, National Competition for Young Performers of the Canadian Broadcasting Corporation; version for two voices and orchestra, 1996

Urfaust—tragédie subjective (after Goethe and Pessoa). 1999. Incidental music, Théâtre UBU

Sacrée Landowska. 2001. Music theatre

Orchestra:

Piece for Chamber Orchestra (1967, rev 1971). Ms

Hommage à Vasarely. 1977. Ms. RCI 658/McGill University Records 81013 (McGill SO, Mayer conductor)

Vanishing Points. 1983. Ms

Litaneia (Aristophanes). 1984. Mixed chorus, orch. Ms

Over Time. 1987. Ms. Centrediscs CMC-CD-3188 (Orch métropolitain)

Time and Again. 1987. Ms

Zefiro torna. 1994

Einer nach dem Andern!. 1994. Chamber orchestra

Homme/Papillon. 2002

Chamber:

Sonatina. 1965. Fl, piano. Ms

Prologue, Scene and Movement (classical Latin palindrome). 1968. Sop, viola, 2 piano. Ms

Sestina. 1968. Chamb ensemble. Ms

Fantaisies and/et Allusions. 1969. Saxophone quartet, snare drum. Ms

Anaphora. 1970. Chamb ensemble. Ms

Reception and Offering Music 'Anaphora IV.' 1975. Ww quintet, percussion. Ms. Mel SMLP-4040 (York Winds)

Jeux de Scène 'fantaisie-hommage à Richard Wagner.' 1976. Hn, oboe, violoncello, piccolo, fl, piano, mar, 3 glockenspiel, blacksmith's anvil. Ms

Les Blues d'Orphée. 1981. Fl, clarinet, viola, violoncello, piano. Ms

Le Dernière Sirène. 1981. Ondes M, piano, percussion. Ms

Médiator '...pincer la musique aujourd'hui..'. 1981. Chamb ensemble. Ms. RCI 570 (Événements du neuf, Rea conductor)

Treppenmusik. 1982. Saxophone quartet, 4 clarinet, violin, viola, violoncello, double-bass, tape. Ms. Centrediscs CMC-2085 (SMCQ)

Glide Reflexions. 1984. 2 clarinet, 2 violoncello. Ms

Les Raisons des Forces Mouvantes. 1984. Fl, alto fl, string quartet. Ms

Spin. 1984. Str quartet, piano. Ms

Some Time Later. 1986. RAAD string quartet. Ms

Big Apple Jam. 1987–91. Saxophone quartet, tape. Ms

Kubla Khan. 1989. Chamb ensemble. Ms. (1991). University of Montreal UNMUS-105 (CD) (Nouvel ensemble moderne)

Objets Perdus. 1992. String quartet

Piano:

What You Will. 1969. 2 or 4 hands. Jay 1971

Anaphora II. 1971 (rev 1972). Ms

Las Meninas. 1990–1. Ms

Also Le Petit Livre des 'Ravalet' (1983) for early music instr, tape, and 4 narrator, and Offenes Lied (1986) for 2 soprano and clarinet, both manuscript; and 2 works for tape, S.P.I. 51 and STER 1.3 (both 1969), recorded on Marathon MS-2211

== See also ==
- List of Canadian composers
