= Piano Concerto No. 1 (Villa-Lobos) =

Piano concerto by Heitor Villa-Lobos

- Concerto by Heitor Villa-Lobos
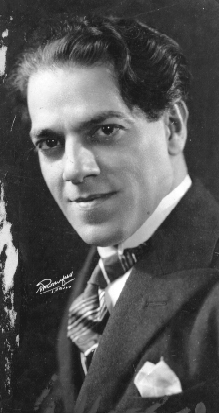
- Heitor Villa-Lobos
- Catalogue: W453
- Genre: Concerto
- Form: Concerto
- Composed: 1945: Rio de Janeiro
- Dedication: Ellen Ballon
- Published: 1984: Paris (reduction for two pianos)
- Publisher: Max Eschig
- Recorded: June 1949 Ellen Ballon, piano; Orchestre de la Suisse Romande; Ernest Ansermet, cond. (issued 1949 on LP, London LLP 77, matrix ARL.66 and ARL.67).
- Duration: 38 min
- Movements: Four
- Scoring: piano; orchestra

Premiere
- Date: 11 October 1946
- Location: Theatro Municipal, Rio de Janeiro
- Conductor: Heitor Villa-Lobos
- Performers: Ellen Ballon, piano; Orquestra Sinfônica do Theatro Municipal

Piano Concerto No. 1, W453, is a composition for piano and orchestra by the Brazilian composer Heitor Villa-Lobos.

He composed the First Piano Concerto in Rio de Janeiro in 1945. It was commissioned by the Canadian pianist Ellen Ballon, who gave the first performance at the Theatro Municipal in Rio de Janeiro on 11 October 1946, with the composer conducting the Orquestra Sinfônica do Theatro Municipal. Ballon also gave the American premiere of the concerto in Dallas, conducted by Antal Dorati in 1946, the Canadian premiere with Désiré Defauw on 28 October 1947 at the Plateau Auditorium in Montreal, and the London premiere with Thomas Beecham in 1956. She also recorded the work with Ernest Ansermet in 1949, with whom she also made return Canadian performances on 30 and 31 January 1951 with the Montreal Symphony Orchestra.

A typical performance lasts about 38 minutes.

== Instrumentation ==
The work is scored for solo piano and an orchestra consisting of piccolo, 2 flutes, 2 oboes, cor anglais, 2 clarinets, bass clarinet, 2 bassoons, contrabassoon, 4 horns, 3 trumpets, 3 tenor trombones, bass trombone, tuba, percussion (timpani, tam-tam, triangle, and bass drum), harp, and strings.

== Analysis ==
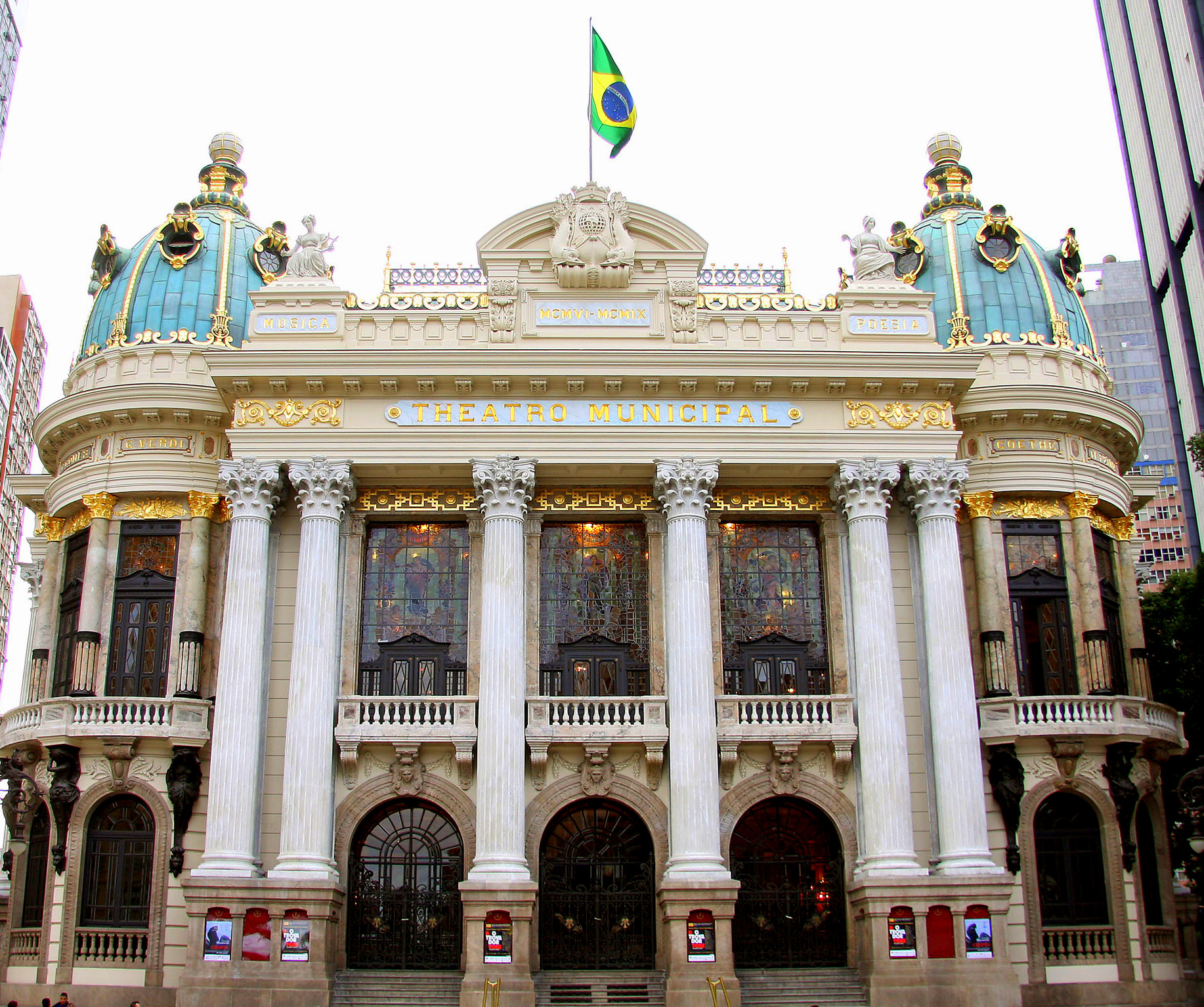
Theatro Municipal, Rio de Janeiro, venue of the concerto's première

The concerto has four movements:

1. Allegro
2. Allegro (poco scherzando)
3. Andante – Andantino (quasi andante) – Cadenza
4. Allegro non troppo

Although Villa-Lobos adheres to the four-movement structure often found in piano concertos, he makes little effort to follow the traditional structures, based on melodic ideas, within the movements. Instead, he uses rhythmic elements to define sections of movements.

== Discography ==
- Villa-Lobos: Piano Concerto. Ellen Ballon, piano; Orchestre de la Suisse Romande, conducted by Ernest Ansermet. Recorded at the Victoria Hall, Geneva, June 1949. LP recording, 1 disc, 12 inch, 33⅓ rpm, monaural. London LLP 77. London: London Records, 1949. [Third movement heavily cut.]
  - Reissued on CD (with Albéniz: Five movements from Iberia, orch. Arbós, and Navarra, completed by Déodat de Séverac). Decca Eloquence 4800456. Sydney: Decca Records, 2010.
- Э. Вилла-Лобос: концерт н1 для фортепиано с оркестром [H. Villa Lobos: Concerto No. 1 for Piano and Orchestra]. Arthur Moreira-Lima, piano; Moscow Radio Great Symphony Orchestra, conducted by Vladimir Fedoseev. Recorded 1976. LP recording, 1 disc: 1 audio disc: analog, 33⅓ rpm, stereo; 12 in. stereo. Melodiya C 10-08167-8 (matrix С10-08167/3-1, С10-08168/3-1). [Moscow]: Melodiya, 1980.
- Heitor Villa-Lobos: 5 concertos para piano e orquestra. Fernando Lopes, piano; Orquestra Sinfônica Municipal de Campinas; conducted by Benito Juarez. Recorded 18–24 June 1984, in the Teatro Interno do Centro de Covivência Cultural da Campinas. LP recording, 4 discs: 12 inch, 33⅓ rpm, stereo. Energia de São Paulo: LPVL 01/25 – LPVL 04/25. São Paulo: Energia de São Paulo, [1984?].
- Heitor Villa-Lobos: Five Piano Concertos. Cristina Ortiz, piano; Royal Philharmonic Orchestra, conducted by Miguel Ángel Gómez Martínez. Recorded at the Walthamstow Assembly Hall in October 1989, January and July 1990. 2-CD set: stereo. London 430 628-2 (430 629-2 and 430 630–2). London: The Decca Record Company Limited, 1992.
- Heitor Villa-Lobos: Cinco Conciertos para Piano y Orquesta. Elvira Santiago, piano (Concerto No. 1); Ulises Hernández, piano (Concerto No. 2); Patricio Malcolm, piano (Concerto No. 3); Harold López-Nussa, piano (Concerto No. 4); Roberto Urbay, piano (Concerto No. 5); Orquesta Sinfónica Nacional de Cuba, conducted by Enrique Pérez Mesa. Concerto No. 1 recorded at the Teatro Auditorium Amadeo Roldán, Havana, Cuba, 14 December 2003, part of the XXV Festival Internacional del Nuevo Cine Latinoamericano. 2 CDs + 1 DVD. Colibrí DVD/CD 050. Havana: Colibrí, 2006.
