= Antonio Juanas =

Spanish composer

Antonio de Juanas (c. 1762 – after 1819) was a composer in Spain and Mexico.

The birthplace of Antonio Juanas is known from two letters sent to the Cathedral of Jaén in 1784. He was born in either 1762 or 1763 in the town of Narros, in the province of Soria. He was then educated at the San Felipe Neri Infant School of the Sigüenza Cathedral from the age of eight or nine, remaining for another ten years. It is possible that his teacher was Acacio Garcilópez, chapel master of Sigüenza in the 1770s. In 1780 he was made maestro de capilla at Alcalá de Henares Cathedral at the age of 17. Around the same time, the chapter of the Cathedral of Mexico decided to travel to the Iberian Peninsula to recruit a new chapel master as well as musicians. Antonio Juanas, accompanied by the singers Bartolomé Vicente Lo sada (bass), José García Pulgar (tenor) and Manuel Pastrana (tenor) all signed a contract of employment for the cathedral and traveled to Mexico City in 1791. Juanas held this position until 1815.

Unfortunately, the trip affected Juanas' health, which worsened during his stay in Mexico City. In 1797 he suffered from a "perfidious fainting of the head that prevented him from reading, writing and exercising all functions that are related to his ministry and office", from which he still suffered in 1804. Due to similar health issues, the three musicians who had traveled with him to Mexico had returned to Spain at about the same time. Health problems were common among Spaniards who traveled to Mexico: the heat, humidity, accumulation of garbage and lack of water were inhospitable to immigrants. In spite of all this, Juanas continued to hold his position until February 14, 1815, where he requested permission to return to Spain, which he did in 1819.

== Compositions ==
His compositions in the music archive of Mexico City Cathedral contain ten a capella Masses, 18 Masses with instrumental accompaniment and over 200 other works. The archive mentions 419 works in total, which would make Juanas the most prolific composer in the vice royal territory. Two motets are preserved in the Monastery of Montserrat, composed in Madrid and dated 1789: Regina caeli for 4 voices and Sacerdotes Domini for 8 voices. An eight-voice mass is preserved in El Escorial.

== Recordings ==
- Antonio Juanas: Premiere Recordings of Selected Choral Works; Collegium Mundi Novi, Variant 6, John Austin Clark. Conductor: R. Ryan Endris (Centaur/Naxos, 2018, CRC 3663)
