= Axel Strauss =

German violinist (born 1974)

Axel Strauss (born 1974) is a German violinist, and a professor at the Schulich School of Music of McGill University in Montreal.

At the age of seventeen he won the silver medal at the Enescu Competition in Romania and has been recognized with many other awards, including top prizes in the Bach, Wieniawski and Kocian competitions. He studied at the Music Academies of Lübeck and Rostock with Petru Munteanu. Strauss has been residing in the United States since 1996 when he began working with Dorothy DeLay at the Juilliard School and became her teaching assistant in 1998. That same year, he became the first German artist to ever win the international Naumburg Violin Award in New York.

In 1999, he was a soloist with the Naumburg Orchestral Concerts, in the Naumburg Bandshell, Central Park (NY), summer series.

In 2007, he was the violinist in the world premiere of "Two Awakenings and a Double Lullaby", written for him by composer Aaron Jay Kernis.

His recordings include the Brahms violin concerto (BPOlive), Mendelssohn's Songs Without Words (Naxos), the violin version of the Clarinet sonatas, op. 120, by Brahms (Organum) and the duo for violin and cello, op. 7, by Zoltán Kodály (Oehms Classics). In December 2009, Naxos released his recording of the 24 Caprices by Pierre Rode. Amadeus Press has issued a DVD featuring Strauss in concert at Steinway Hall, New York. His chamber music partners include Menahem Pressler, Kim Kashkashian, Joel Krosnick, Robert Mann and Bernard Greenhouse.

Srauss has appeared as soloist with the New Century Chamber Orchestra, the San Francisco Academy Orchestra, and with orchestras in Budapest, Hamburg, New York, Seoul, Shanghai, Bucharest, and Cincinnati, among others. He has also appeared as guest concertmaster of the Berlin Philharmonic and the Montreal Symphony Orchestra.

Strauss performs on a violin by Giovanni Francesco Pressenda, Turin 1845.

In December, 2023, two former students of Strauss filed a lawsuit naming Strauss and the San Francisco Conservatory of Music as defendants, in which the plaintiffs accuse Strauss of having sexually assaulted them between 2007 and 2009. According to Conservatory officials, as Strauss is no longer employed there, he did not respond to their efforts to launch an internal investigation of the allegations.
