= Zoran Todorovich =

German opera singer

Zoran Todorovich (Serbian Cyrillic: Зоран Тодоровић) is a German opera singer, director and costume designer of Serbian origin. He is lirico-spinto tenor, and started his career in Belgrade, Serbia, where he was born.

== Biography ==
Zoran Todorovich was born in Belgrade in 1961, Serbia (at the time Yugoslavia). He began his first musical training in both piano and singing at the Belgrade Conservatoire and completed his studies at the Hochschule für Musik Frankfurt with an honours degree. He also studied in Munich. He begann his career at the Landestheater Detmold, and was a member of the Staatsoper Hannover from 1994 to 1999. In 2022, Todorovich chose Puccini's Madama Butterfly for his debut as opera director and costume designer at the Landestheater Detmold, with Megan Marie Hart in the title role. The production was very well received by audiences and critics, thanks to Todorovich's deep familiarity with the work that he had performed as Pinkerton since 1997.

== Discography ==
- Zoran Todorovich: Portrait (Arte Nova Classics – LC 03480, 2001)
- Der Zigeunerprimas (classic production osnabrück – 777 058-2, 2005)
- Franz Lehár – Schön ist die Welt (classic production osnabrück – 777 055-2, 2006)
- Zoran Todorovich: Arias (OehmsClassics – OC 793, 2011)

== Videography ==
- Norma (Deutsche Grammophon – 00044007342190, 2006)
- Tosca (Phoenix Edition –801, 2008)
- La fanciulla del West (Opus Arte – OA BD7075 D, 2010)
