= Andrew Culver (composer) =

American composer

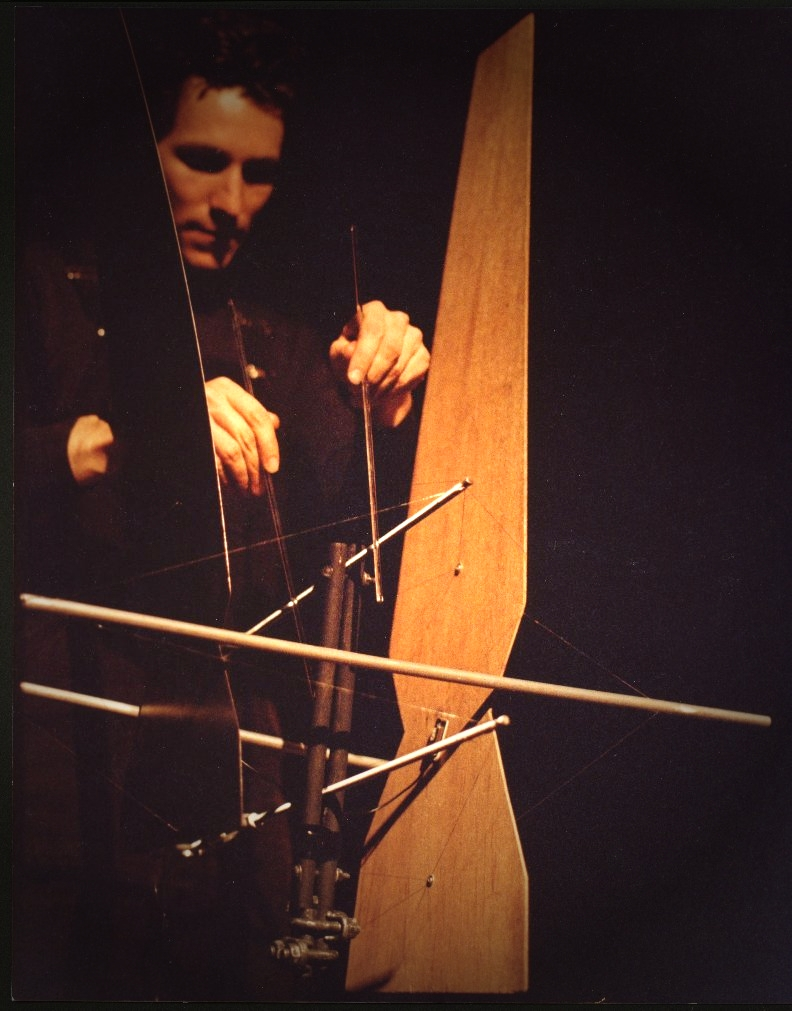

Background information
- Born: August 30, 1953; Morristown, New Jersey, USA
- Occupations: Musician, Composer, Entrepreneur
- Instruments: Electronics, Piano, Tensegrity Sound Source, Percussion, Guitar

Andrew Culver (born August 30, 1953) is a Canadian-American composer and software entrepreneur. Culver's works have included chamber and orchestral music, electronic and computer music, sound sculpture and music sculpture, film, lighting, text pieces, and installations. He performs concerts with sound sources of his invention based on the tensegrity structural principle as elaborated by Buckminster Fuller, a lifelong influence.

== Career ==
Culver worked as John Cage's creative assistant for 11 years and was involved in all aspects of Cage's musical, poetic, operatic, and film work. He wrote the chance operations and compositional process software Cage used during that period and directed Cage's operas, sound, and light installations. He continued directing Cage installations and operas after the composer's death, including posthumous premieres.

Culver was the founding member of Sonde, a music design and ensemble that grew out of McGill University. Culver's interests are varied in concept, technique, and media. He has created and directed work in various performance, theatrical, electronic, computer, audio-visual, sculptural, and installation situations. He has written on art, music, and anarchy since the 1970s for publications such as the Montreal Star, Musicworks, and Circuit. He has developed software and database structures and invented or developed a variety of formal, structural, time, pitch, and microtonal systems.

Culver's largest work is Ocean 1—133 (1994, 2006), the orchestral component of Ocean, which was conceived by John Cage and Merce Cunningham, with choreography by Merce Cunningham, electronic music by David Tudor, and design by Marsha Skinner. David Tudor provided and performed (before his death) the electronic music component, and artist Marsha Skinner provided the lighting and costumes. The work features 150 soloists performing without a conductor. It has been performed 60 times at Lincoln Center in New York, La Fenice in Venice, and others in Amsterdam, Brussels, Belfast, Berkeley, Montpelier, Japan, New York, London, and Miami. Culver describes the work by saying, "There is no score. There's 150 solo parts. Everyone is a soloist."

Culver is the founder and co-CEO of iLiv, a software and services company. He is the founder of the Anarchic Harmony Foundation, a non-profit organization that funds and manages projects in music, opera, multimedia, etc. He is the inventor of the Anarchic Philharmonic.
