= Théodore-Lafleur Bullock =

Canadian Army officer (1901–1972)

Théodore Lafleur "Ted" Bullock (May 27, 1901 – October 8, 1972) was a Lieutenant Colonel in the Royal 22^{e} Régiment. He was born in Roxton Pond, Quebec, Canada. Bullock long served as Secretary to Montreal Mayor Camillien Houde. He received the Medal of Freedom in 1946. Divorced from his first wife, Agnes Mary Binnie Bullock, by Act of parliament in 1949 or 1950, he remarried in 1958 to Ellen Ballon.

Bullock died from a heart attack at the Ritz Carlton Hotel in Montreal, Quebec, Canada on October 8, 1972.

== Sources ==
- genealogieonline
