= Sonde (band) =

Canadian experimental musical group

Sonde is a music design and performance ensemble based in Montreal. From 1975 to about 1985, Sonde gave hundreds of performances in North America and Europe on sound sources of their own invention. Sonde was also engaged in television, film, and dance (particularly contact improvisation).

== History ==
Sonde was founded in 1975 and originally called MuD (an abbreviation of Musical Design). MuD gave their first performance in 1975 at Pollack Hall, McGill University, Montreal. Viewers/listeners were amazed to see and hear musical performances emerge from an improbable set of never-before-seen "sound sources" such as Les Plaques and The Amazing Three Man Hum Drum.

The group grew out of a course called Music Design taught at McGill University by Mario Bertoncini.

The original members of MuD were Andrew Culver, Pierre Dostie, Chris Howard, and Charles de Mestral. Over the years, other members have included Linda Pavelka (primarily as a vocalist), Robin Minard and Keith Daniel (primarily as an electronics inventor and engineer).

== Concepts ==
The notion of a sound source is central to Sonde's approach. While an instrument is a tool used for the performing of compositions other than itself, a sound source is both the composition and the object from which the sound emanates.

The Bertoncini concept of musical design is equally central to Sonde's work. Bertoncini proposed that composition begin before the instrument, requiring the composer to explore the acoustic properties of materials and structures and invent new instruments as part and parcel of creating a new composition. Bertoncini has built up a large collection of device compositions over 40 years.

In writings from the early 1980s, Andrew Culver defined musical design thus:

=== Musical Design ===
The exploration into the sonic possibilities of various materials in various formats, the design and construction of sound sources based on these findings and suitable for performance, and the re-exploration into the sonic worlds of the sound sources during performance through exquisite improvisation (from seeking, not providing), is a compositional process called musical design.

== Recordings ==
- En concert (Music Gallery Editions, MGE 14, 1978) -- LP
- En ondes (Oral, ORAL 16, 2007) -- CD
- En concert (Oral, ORAL 21, 2007) -- CD re-issue of 1978 LP
- En voyage (Oral, ORAL 30, 2009) -- DVD compilation of all available audio tracks + Booklet

== See also ==
- Andrew Culver (composer)
