= Megan Marie Hart =

American opera singer

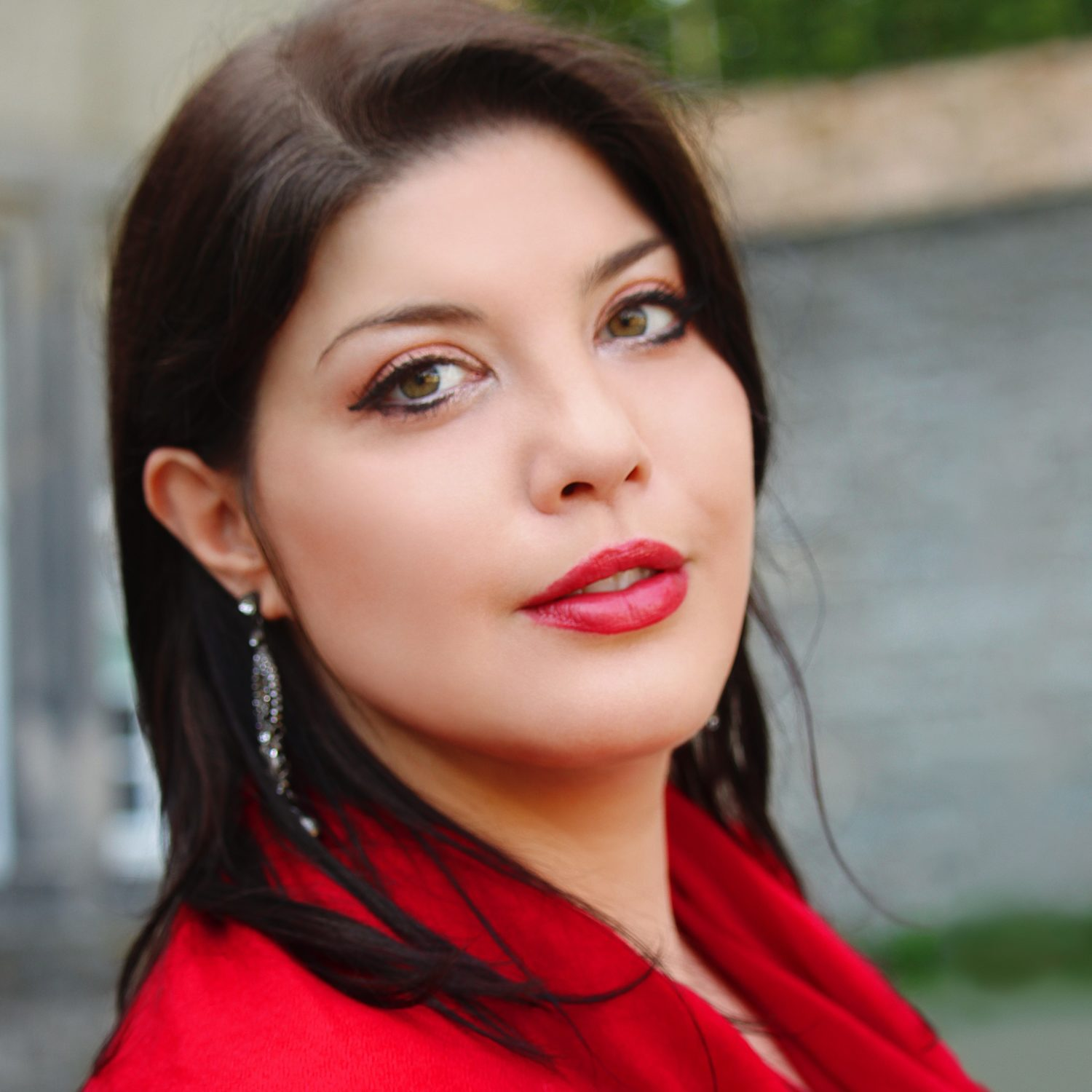
- Hart at the Theaterpreis ceremony in 2019
- Born: 1983 (age 42–43)
- Education: Oberlin Conservatory; Manhattan School of Music; Music Academy of the West
- Occupation: Operatic soprano
- Website: www.meganmariehart.com

Megan Marie Hart (born 1983) is an American operatic soprano from Eugene, Oregon, performing in leading operatic roles and concerts in America and Europe.

== Life and education ==
Hart was born in Santa Monica, California, and grew up in Eugene, Oregon, after the age of six. Father Dale Hart, a metallurgist, and mother Claudia Carol Hart (née Chambers) bought a farm in Oregon in the early 1990s, where he was co-owner of an organic juice company. Hart has been interested in playing the piano since she was three, and began taking lessons at age nine. In addition, she played the violin for five years, and then started choral singing. In 1999, Hart attended the Oregon Bach Festival's Youth Choral Academy for the first time, led by Anton Armstrong and Helmuth Rilling. Inspired by Rilling, Hart decided to become a professional singer instead of a pianist. Starting in 2001, Hart took professional singing lessons with voice teacher Beverly Park, who encouraged her to study with Richard Miller at the Oberlin Conservatory of Music. In 2005, Hart received her Bachelor of Music degree from Oberlin Conservatory. In the summer of 2005, Hart was in the Gerdine Young Artists program with the Opera Theatre of Saint Louis, as well as a young artist at Opera North. In October 2005, Hart first met Marilyn Horne at Horne's master class in Oberlin. Hart received her Master of Music degree in Opera Theater from Oberlin Conservatory in 2006, and was awarded the Faustina Hurlbutt Prize, for an outstanding graduating student in cello, piano, violin, or voice. She received a Professional Studies Certificate (PS) from Manhattan School of Music, where she studied with Mignon Dunn. She was a participant in Seattle Opera's Young Artist program from 2007 to 2010, where she studied with Jane Eaglen, and sang Tytania in Britten's A Midsummer Night's Dream, Lauretta and Nella in Puccini's Gianni Schicchi, and Tatyana in Tatyana's Letter, Peter Kazaras' adaptation of Tchaikovsky's Eugene Onegin. In 2010 Hart again studied with Marilyn Horne, at the Music Academy of the West, where she won the Marilyn Horne Song Competition. Horne has since remained Hart's teacher.

== Career ==
=== Opera ===
Hart's operatic repertoire spans Baroque roles such as Handel's Alcina, and Almirena in his Rinaldo, leading ladies in Mozart operas such as the Countess in Le nozze di Figaro, Donna Anna in Don Giovanni, and Fiordiligi in Così fan tutte. She appeared in roles from the 20th century, such as Lady Billows in Britten's Albert Herring, Elle in Poulenc's La voix humaine and Blanche in his Dialogues of the Carmelites. She has performed lirico-spinto roles such as the title roles in Aida, Luisa Miller, Madama Butterfly and Tosca, as well as Chrysothemis in Elektra, Gilda in Rigoletto, Mimì in La bohème, and Tatyana in Eugene Onegin.

In 2010, a production of Alcina with Bourbon Baroque was staged for a TV recording, that has since repeatedly been aired.

In 2015, Hart joined the ensemble of the Landestheater Detmold, Germany. Here she returned to the role of the woman ("Elle") in La voix humaine in an all female production, staged by Karin Kotzbauer, conducted by Sachie Mallet, in set and costumes by Tatiana Tarwitz, and with dramaturge Elizabeth Wirtz.

In 2018, Hart appeared as Tosca for the first time. The production was well received by critics and audience. Two awards Detmolder Theaterring were bestowed, for best direction to Ernö Weil, and for best singer to Hart. Hart received her second Theaterring for her debut in the role of Luisa Miller in the following year. Hart left Detmold in 2020 to join the ensemble of the Staatstheater Darmstadt, where she returned to the roles of Mimì in La bohème and Donna Anna in Don Giovanni, and gave her role debuts as Elsa in Wagner's Lohengrin, Liù in Puccini's Turandot and Madeleine de Faublas in Abraham's operetta Ball im Savoy. Hart was invited back as a guest to the Landestheater Detmold in 2022 for her debut as Cio-Cio-San in Puccini's Madama Butterfly. The production was tenor Zoran Todorovich's debut as director, and conductor Per-Otto Johansson's premiere as Generalmusikdirektor (GMD). In 2023 Hart sang the role of Tatyana in Tchaikovsky's Eugene Onegin for the first time in the original Russian at the Staatstheater Darmstadt. She had previously performed the role in English on tour with the Seattle Young Artists, and with the Yakima Symphony at the Capitol Theatre. In 2024, Hart made her role debut as Desdemona in Verdi's Otello alongside Gaston Rivero in the title role, and Aris Argiris as Iago, sang Antonia in Offenbach's Les contes d'Hoffmann. Matthew Vickers sang the title role of Hoffmann, it was his opera debut in Germany. In the same year Hart sang Chrysothemis in Elektra again, with Vickers as Aegisth. In the same season, Hart made her debuts at the Schlosstheater Schwetzingen as Donna Anna with the Mannheim National Theatre, and as the Mother, the Vain Lady and the Rose in the German-language premiere of Pierangelo Valtinoni's Il piccolo principe. In 2025, she made her debut as Elvire in Auber's La muette de Portici with Vickers as Masaniello. At the beginning of the 2025/2026 season, Hart returned to the title role of Aida, alongside Vickers in his debut as Radamès, and Argiris as Amonasro, in a co-production between the Staatstheater Darmstadt and the Finnish National Opera directed by Noa Naamat, and conducted by Johannes Zahn, the first Kapellmeister and deputy GMD.

=== Concerts ===
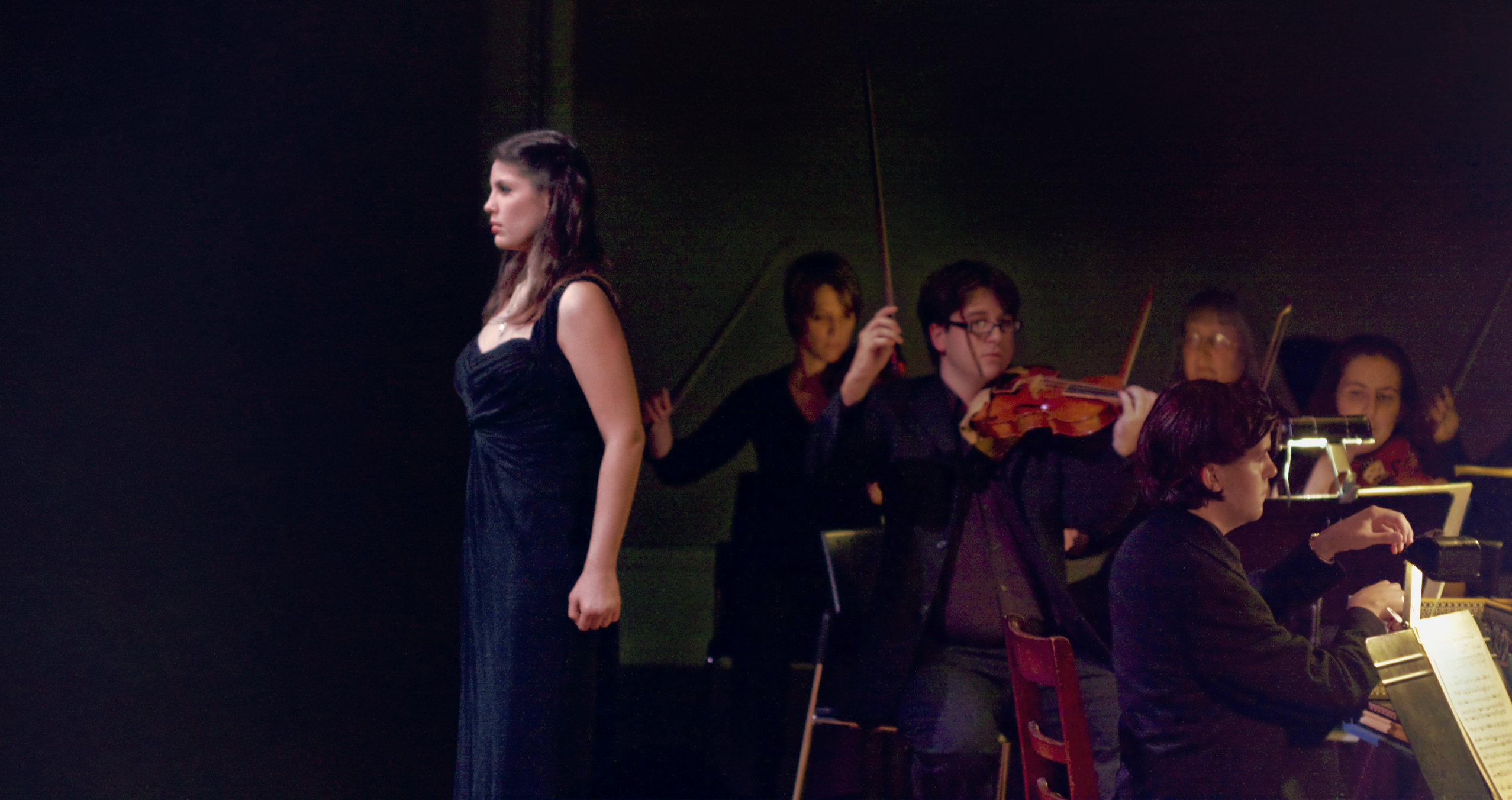
Megan Marie Hart in concert with Bourbon Baroque

In 2008 Hart performed with the early music ensemble Bourbon Baroque. The same year, she made her first TV appearance as a professional singer as the soprano soloist in Beethoven's Ninth Symphony with the Seattle Symphony in a concert for the Dalai Lama and Desmond Tutu. With the same orchestra she sang in a Holiday Pops concert conducted by Marvin Hamlisch, where she premiered his song Chanukah Lights, an original composition written for the occasion. In 2009 she performed art songs composed by Lazar Weiner, a survivor of the Holocaust, with Music of Remembrance, and Tatyana in concert performances of Eugen Onegin. In September 2010 she sang Marie in excerpts from Rufus Wainwright's Prima Donna alongside Janis Kelly as Régine with the Oregon Symphony under Carlos Kalmar. Wainwright's concert at the Arlene Schnitzer Concert Hall was the opening event of the Time-Based Art Festival, and the US premiere of music from his opera. In November 2010 Hart sang the soprano solo in Shostakovich's song cycle From Jewish Folk Poetry with Music of Remembrance.

Hart made her Carnegie Hall debut with art songs by Franz Liszt in January 2012. She returned in March of the same year to perform in the winners concert of the Liederkranz Foundation competition, where she had won first place in the Lieder category. In the summer of 2012, Hart sang in concerts with conductor Eve Queler, who she previously had worked with in a production of Le nozze di Figaro at Oberlin. In 2013 and 2015 Hart performed arias in concerts with orchestras in Germany. In 2016, she sang the soprano solo in Mendelssohn's oratorio Elijah. In autumn 2017, Hart sang the soprano solo in Mahler's Resurrection Symphony. Hart performed Mozart's concert aria "Misera, dove son? (KV 369)" with GMD Lutz Rademacher in her last concert as Landestheater Detmold ensemble member in June 2020, and sang her first concert as ensemble member of the Staatstheater Darmstadt with GMD Daniel Cohen in September 2020.

Hart's 2021 recital Famous Musicians of Jewish Origin with pianist Giacomo Marignani was the official opening event of the Darmstadt celebrations in the nationwide festival year 1700 Jahre jüdisches Leben in Deutschland commemorating the first documented mention of Jewish communities in the territory of present-day Germany. In several sold-out performances at the Staatstheater and the Darmstadt Synagogue, she sang Simon Sargon's Shema: 5 Poems of Primo Levi, Korngold's Drei Lieder, Op. 22, Viktor Ullmann's Drei Sonette aus dem Portugiesischen, Op. 29, and the grand opera arias "Il va venir" from Halévy's La Juive, "Pourquoi suis-je venue" from Saint-Saëns' Proserpine and "Robert, toi que j'aime" from Meyerbeer's Robert le diable.

In the summer of 2024, Hart sang arias in opera galas with the orchestra of the Mannheim National Theatre in the garden of the Schwetzingen Palace under Jānis Liepiņš, with the Darmstädter Hofkapelle under Wolfgang Seeliger at the festival Darmstädter Residenzfestspiele held at the Mathildenhöhe World Heritage Site, and with the Staatsorchester Darmstadt at the season opening concert of the Staatstheater Darmstadt. Hart was the soprano soloist in Verdi's Messa da Requiem with the same orchestra under GMD Cohen.

On the eve of the International Holocaust Remembrance Day 2025, which marked the 80th anniversary of the liberation of the Auschwitz concentration camp, Hart premiered Letters to Fred: A Portrait of the Herzberg Family during the Holocaust, a song cycle written for her by Israeli composer Bracha Bdil and commissioned by the Staatstheater Darmstadt for the occasion. Hart wrote the libretto based on letters to Fritz "Fred" Herzberg, who escaped on the Kindertransport, which were given to her by his daughter Joanne Herzberg.

== Awards and recognition ==
- Faustina Hurlbutt Prize 2006
- Ladies Musical Club Award 2009, Winner
- Marilyn Horne Song Competition 2010, Grand Prize Winner
- Giulio Gari International Vocal Competition 2011, Grant Winner
- Liederkranz Foundation Competition 2012, First Place, Art Song division
- Theaterring Detmold 2018, Winner best singer
- Theaterring Detmold 2019, Winner best singer

== Recordings ==
=== Video ===
- Handel: Alcina. (Caroline Copeland, USA 2010) With Teresa Wakim (Morgana), Maegan Amelia Brus (Oberto), Kristen Leich (Ruggiero), Katherine Lerner (Bradamante), David Menzies (Oronte), Evan Prizant (Melisso), Bourbon Baroque. Performance in 2010, first Broadcast and DVD in 2011.

=== Audio ===
- Auber: La Muette de Portici. With Ricardo Garcia (Alfonso), Matthew Vickers (Masaniello), Megan Marie Hart (Elvire), Georg Festl (Pietro), Zaza Gagua (Borello), Marco Mondragón (Lorenzo), Johannes Seokhoon Moon (Selva), Kwanghee Choi (Ein Fischer). Opera choir of the Staatstheater Darmstadt, Staatsorchester Darmstadt conducted by Nicolas Kierdorf. (La Maison de la Lyrique, Auber 0024, 2025.)
