= Bourbon Baroque =

- Early music ensemble
- Founded: 2007
- Location: Louisville, Kentucky; United States
- Website: www.bourbonbaroque.com

Bourbon Baroque is a period instrument ensemble from Louisville, Kentucky. It specialises in historical informed performance of the music of the 17th and 18th centuries.

== History ==
Bourbon Baroque was founded by harpsichordist John Austin Clark and baroque violinist Nicolas Fortin in the summer of 2007 in Louisville, Kentucky. Since 2017, the ensemble is led by Clark and violinist Alice Culin-Ellison.

== Overview ==
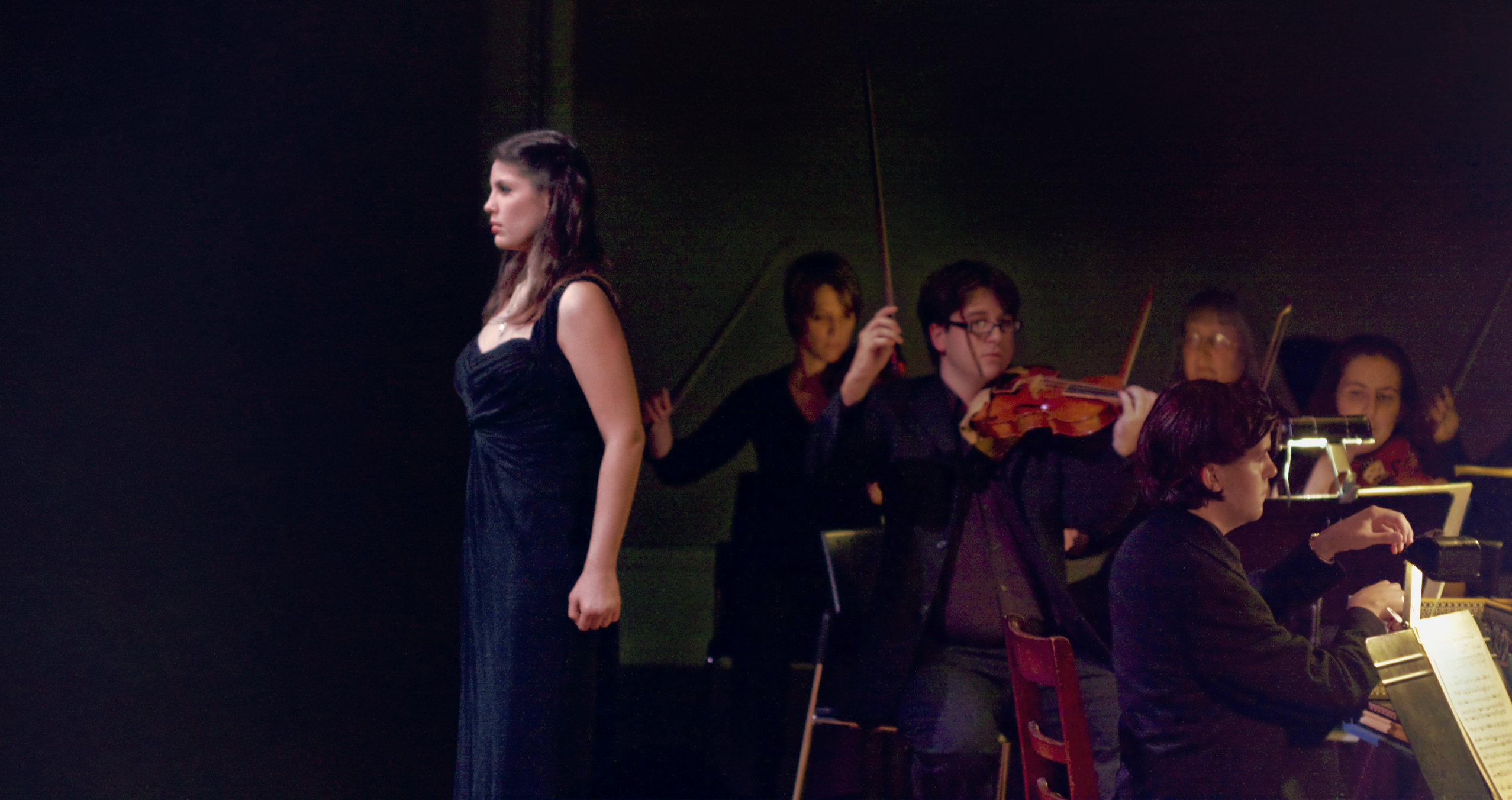
Bourbon Baroque performing with soprano Megan Marie Hart in 2008.

The ensemble varies in size based on the program and produces performances ranging from chamber music concerts to full opera productions. The 2010 production of George Frideric Handel's opera Alcina has been recorded for TV and aired first on 12 April 2011. Bourbon Baroque has been performing Handel's Messiah in the holiday season every year since 2013.

Bourbon Baroque performs regularly throughout the year in a variety of venues, often collaborating with performing arts organizations such as Squallis Puppeteers (Louisville, KY) and Empire City Men's Chorus (New York, New York).

Bourbon Baroque is a 501(c)3 not-for-profit organization.

== Name origin ==
Bourbon Baroque is named after the French royal dynasty House of Bourbon to reflect the ensembles inspiration by the art culture at royal European courts. Louis XIV of France, after whom Louisville was named, was from this dynasty.

== Logo ==
Logo till 2020

The logo consists of a cursive letter B with three slanted lines ending in leaves resembling Fleur-de-Lis, the emblem of the House of Bourbon and Louisville. It is usually gold on solid dark blue, or yellow with a blue shadow. Some instances of the logo feature the words Bourbon Baroque next to it. Until 2020, the slant and decorative swirls were more pronounced.

== Scholarship ==
In the fall of 2016 Bourbon Baroque established the annual Nicolas Fortin Scholarship in honour of co-founder and co-artistic director Nicolas Fortin (1980–2016) after his passing. This scholarship is open to all musicians specializing in baroque music without further restrictions.

Scholarship recipients
Year	Recipient	Instrument
2017	Wei-Shuan Yu	Viola da gamba
2018	Paulina Francisco	Soprano
2019	Seth Van Embden	Viola
2020	Eleanor Legault	Violin
2021	Liz Loayza	Violin
2021	Michael Delfín	Harpsichord
2022	Stephanie Rempel	Baroque flute

== See also ==
- Historically informed performance
- Baroque music
- Baroque dance
- List of early music ensembles
