= Ellen Ballon =

Canadian pianist

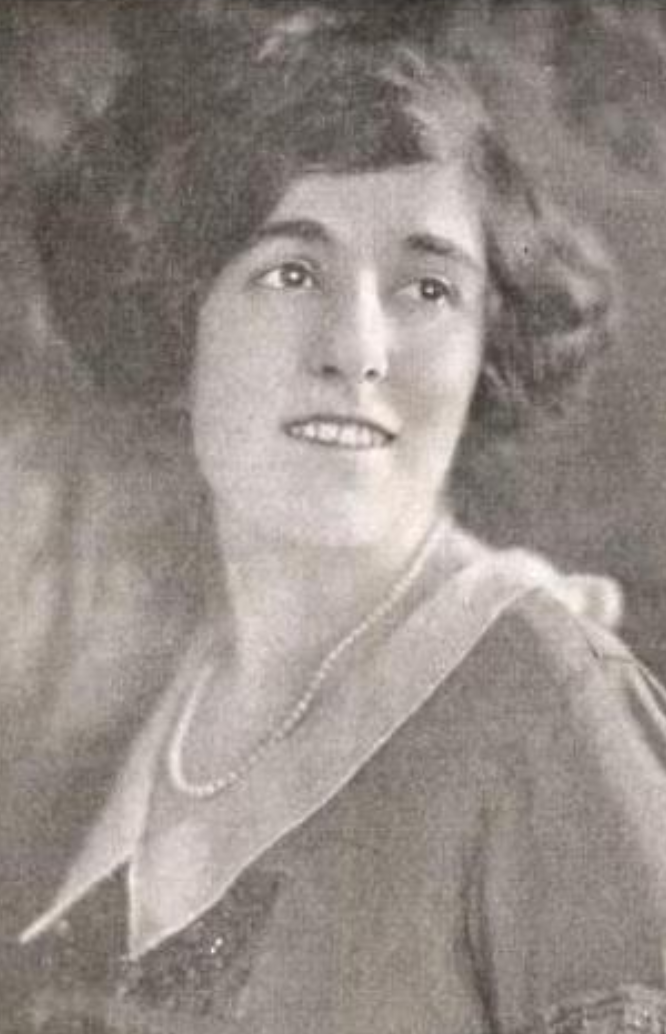
- Ellen Ballon, from a 1923 publication
- Born: 6 October 1898; Montréal, Quebec
- Died: 21 December 1969 (aged 71); Montréal, Quebec
- Occupation: Pianist
- Spouse: Theodore-Lafleur Bullock

Ellen Ballon (6 October 1898 – 21 December 1969) was a Canadian pianist.

The daughter of Jewish Lithuanian immigrants, she was born in Montreal, Quebec. A child prodigy, she gave her first concert at the age of five and began studying music at the McGill Conservatorium with Clara Lichtenstein at the age of six.

In 1906, she moved to New York City, where she studied with Rafael Joseffy and Rubin Goldmark. In March 1910, she gave her debut concert there, performing with the New York Symphony. She was invited to perform at the White House for President Taft; she would return to perform for President Roosevelt and President Eisenhower. She went to Switzerland in 1914, where she studied with Josef Hofmann. Because of World War I, she returned to New York in 1916. By this time, she was performing as a concert pianist.

She later began studying with Wilhelm Backhaus, who was in Vienna. Ballon toured Europe in 1927 and Canada in 1928. In 1934, she settled in London. She stopped performing for two years after she broke an ankle getting out of a cab in 1938.

In 1945, she commissioned a concerto from the Brazilian composer Heitor Villa-Lobos. She gave the premiere performance in Rio de Janeiro in 1946, followed by the American and Canadian premieres in 1947. For a short time, she taught at the Faculty of Music at McGill University, where she had established a music scholarship in her own name in 1928. Ballon appeared on the CBC television show Heure du concert.

In 1954, she married Colonel Théodore-Lafleur Bullock.

Ballon died in Montreal at the age of 71.

Ballon was described by Arthur Rubinstein as "the greatest pianistic genius I have ever met".
