= Tempo (radio show) =

CBC Music Program

- Country of origin: Canada
- Language: English
- Syndicates: CBC Music
- Hosted by: Julie Nesrallah
- Original release: September 2, 2008
- Website: www.cbcmusic.ca/programs/tempo

Tempo is the midday program on the CBC Music radio network in Canada, launched on September 2, 2008. It is hosted by Canadian opera singer Julie Nesrallah and airs classical music. Tempo aims to present music and background stories to inspire.

Originally, Tempo ran from 10 a.m. to 3 p.m. each weekday; the show was later cut by an hour, and scheduled from 9 a.m. to 1 p.m. As of summer 2021, the show runs from 9 a.m to 12:00 p.m.

Among the show's features was its Haydn Challenge, a now-completed attempt to play all 104 symphonies of Joseph Haydn during the 2009 calendar year.
