= John Oliver (composer) =

Canadian composer, guitarist and conductor

John Oliver (born 21 September 1959) is a Canadian composer, guitarist, and conductor. An associate of the Canadian Music Centre and a member of the Canadian Electroacoustic Community, his music has been performed throughout North America, Europe, and China. In a 1989 article in The Music Scene, Oliver stated that he intended his music "to make sense without falling back on traditional models".

== Early life and education ==
Born Edward John Clavering Oliver in Vancouver, Oliver is the son of Vancouver artist Edward Oliver and playwright Thelma Oliver (a.k.a. Melissa Cameron). He studied the guitar privately with Robert C. Jordan from 1972 to 1977. He attended the San Francisco Conservatory of Music from 1977 to 1979 where he studied guitar with George Sakellariou and composition with John Adams. He transferred to the University of British Columbia in 1979 where he earned a Bachelor of Music in 1982 and was a pupil of Stephen Chatman. He went on to pursue graduate studies in music composition at McGill University where he earned a Master of Music in 1984 and a Doctor of Musical Arts in 1992. His teachers at McGill included Bruce Mather and John Rea. From 1988 to 1989 he studied in Brussels with Philippe Boesmans and studied psychoacoustics on his own in the library at the Centre Pompidou in Paris.

== Career ==
During the 1980s Oliver was commissioned to compose numerous works, including Halloween (1980, Allison Voth), Before the Freeze (1984, Claude Schryer), Aller-Retour (1988, the SMCQ), New Bloom (1988, Robert Aitken), and Fields Before Us (1990, Lori Freedman). In 1983 he helped found Montreal's Group of the Electronic Music Studio, serving as the organization's co-director through 1987. In 1988 he was awarded first prize and the Canada Council's grand prize for his El Reposo del Fuego at the CBC National Radio Competition for Young Composers. In 1989 his Anamnèse amnésique for orchestra and Aller-Retour for chamber ensemble won two categories in the PROCAN Young Composers' Competition. In 2013, he won "Classical Composition of the Year" at the 2013 Western Canadian Music Awards.

From 1989 to 1991 Oliver served as the composer-in-residence of the Canadian Opera Company (COC). While there he wrote the opera Guacamayo's Old Song and Dance which uses a libretto by the composer's mother that is based on various Guatemalan legends and pays special attention to the culture and politics of the people of Guatemala. The work incorporates pre-recorded sounds of the Guatemalan countryside and uses a score for five singers, winds, brass, guitar, percussion, and live electronics. The opera premiered in Toronto on 26 February 1991 and was subsequently broadcast on CBC Radio on 19 October 1991. The opera also served as Oliver's doctoral composition.

Oliver's accomplishments at the COC led to his appointments as composer-in-residence of the Vancouver Opera (1992–1996) and Music in the Morning (1993–1995). His work at Music and the Morning included compositions written for Russell Braun, the CBC Vancouver Orchestra, and the St. Lawrence String Quartet. He has since been commissioned to write works for numerous ensembles and organizations, including the National Arts Centre Orchestra and the Vancouver Symphony, and has gained a reputation for integrating musical instruments from various musical cultures in his compositions. He has also worked actively as a performer of his own works and has sometimes conducted his own music.
