= Louisville Bach Society =

American regional chorus

Based in Louisville, Kentucky, the Louisville Bach Society (also known as LBS) was a regional chorus that specialized in performing the works of Johann Sebastian Bach.

== History ==
Inspired by their studies with world-renowned Bach expert Helmut Walcha, Melvin and Margaret Dickinson founded the Louisville Bach Society in 1964.

The Louisville Bach Society's inaugural performance was held in 1964 with sixteen vocalists. Throughout the society's forty-seven years of performances, the choir size grew to include between sixty and seventy members. Its season usually ran from early October to early April. Performances were held at venues throughout the region. The choir specialized in pieces by Bach, as their name suggests, but they also performed pieces by many other famous composers.

The Louisville Bach Society was known for its youth and community outreach. Working with youth choirs throughout Louisville, the LBS educated many youth about Bach. Particularly of interest was their work with the Louisville Youth Choir, and the West Louisville Boys Choir

In 2011, the Louisville Bach Society gave its last performance due to financial and other circumstances.
