= Robin Minard =

Canadian composer and installation artist

Robin Minard (born 1953) is a Canadian composer and installation artist.

Minard was born in Montreal, Quebec, Canada. He began his studies of composition at the University of Western Ontario, then at the Conservatoire de musique du Québec à Montréal, studying under Gilles Tremblay. He then continued his studies with John Rea at McGill University. He was a member of the music design and performance ensemble Sonde from 1979 to 1988. In 1988 he undertook doctoral studies in environmental music at the University of Paris VIII studying under composer Horacio Vaggione. From 1992 to 1996 he taught at the studio for electronic music at the TU Berlin. Since 1997, he has been Professor of Electro-Acoustic Composition at the Hochschule für Musik Franz Liszt and the Bauhaus-Universität in Weimar, Germany.

== Artistic work ==
Minard has concentrated his work on electro-acoustic composition and sound installations in public since the early 1980s. One primary area of interest in his work is dealing with acoustic space in an urban world increasingly polluted with noise, and redefining the concept of functional music in that context. He points out that, with the exception of concert halls, theaters and some conference rooms, the ear is rarely a factor in the planning and design of architecture and urban infrastructure. Minard describes two different strategies of "composing space" which enters into dialogue with the architectural and acoustic environment: conditioning and articulation. Conditioning he considers to be analogous to laying a mantle of color over a space in the visual realm. Articulation refers to the addition of the dimension of time to architecture using sound; the movement of sound articulates and decorates the space. Some examples of his work utilizing these principles include; Music for Passageways (1985), Sound Catchers (1991), Silent Music (1994), Still / Life (1996), Intermezzo (1999), Sound Bits (2002), Outside In (2006) and Klangzug (2010). His works have been published by empreintes DIGITALes, including the album Still/Live, which documents several of his installation-based electroacoustic compositions, emphasizing his interest in quiet, immersive sonic environments that interact subtly with architectural space.
