= Jeannette Aster =

Austrian-born opera director

Jeannette Aster (born 1948) is an Austrian-born opera director who has staged productions in Canada, where she was raised and educated, and internationally.

== Life and career ==
Born in Linz, Austria, Jeannette Aster was brought up and educated in Montreal, Quebec, Canada. Trained initially as a classical dancer, she obtained her BMus in Voice Performance from McGill University before going on to study Opera Production at the London Opera Centre in London, England.

After serving 5 years as a staff director in the Netherlands Opera, Hamburg State Opera and the Deutsche Oper Berlin, Aster made her Canadian debut as stage director in 1977 at the National Arts Centre Festival in Ottawa with Mozart's Magic Flute, returning the following season to direct Cosi fan tutte.

She began working with the Canadian Opera Company in 1972. In 1979 together with General Director Lotfi Mansouri, and his associate John Leberg, she helped found the COC Ensemble (Young Artist programme) and in 1980 became its first resident director. In 1986, at the invitation of Peter Hemmings, she joined the newly formed Los Angeles Music Center Opera as a founding associate director and resident stage director.

From 1988 to 1998 Aster was artistic director of Opera Lyra Ottawa. In addition to presenting mainstage opera productions at the National Arts Centre, Aster commissioned 3 new operas, instituted a comprehensive training programme which included a boys' choir, teen chorus and Associate Artist Studio, and community-based education projects for adults and young people.

Between 1999 and 2008 Aster has been Artistic Consultant and Director of Productions for Eurostage, a private opera producer based in Amsterdam, the Netherlands, which developed new opera productions in collaboration with the State Operas and National theatres in Bulgaria, Czech Republic, Moldova and Russia for touring throughout Western Europe. Her productions of Madama Butterfly, Don Giovanni, Rigoletto, Lucia de Lammermoor, and La Traviata have been presented in theatres in the Netherlands, France, Germany, Switzerland and England.

Aster works internationally as an opera consultant and free-lance stage director. She has produced Verdi's Falstaff in Los Angeles, Otello with Plácido Domingo in Los Angeles and Houston (after which Domingo invited her to direct this opera in Puerto Rico). Her staging of Tristan und Isolde, designed by David Hockney, at the Maggio Musicale in Florence won the 1990 International Critics Prize. Other international engagements include the European Premiere of Sir Michael Tippett's New Year at Glyndebourne and a revival of Katya Kabanova in Paris. She produced Salome at the Lyric Opera Chicago, Washington Opera, San Francisco Opera, Detroit, the Royal Opera House Covent Garden, and the Hong Kong Festival. Aster produced The Marriage of Figaro in New Zealand, later directing La Bohème and Les Contes de Hoffmann.

Aster regularly teaches masterclasses in operatic role study and dramatic interpretation in many opera studios and conservatories around the world . She also sits on the juries of numerous international voice competitions. Since 2001 she has been General Director of La Roche D'Hys - Domaine des Arts, an international centre for cultural encounters and professional development in Burgundy, France. Its programmes include workshops, masterclasses, seminars, exhibitions, conferences, and artists' residency retreats in all the arts disciplines as well as the presentation of concerts, theatrical and literary events.
