= Julie Nesrallah =

Canadian mezzo-soprano and radio host

Julie Nesrallah is a Canadian mezzo-soprano and radio host.

Her past operatic roles include Isabella in L'italiana in Algeri, the Composer in Ariadne auf Naxos, Suzuki in Madama Butterfly, Maddalena in Rigoletto, Cherubino in The Marriage of Figaro, Cenerentola in La Cenerentola, and Carmen in Carmen, among others. She sang "God Save the Queen" for Prince William, Duke of Cambridge and Catherine, Duchess of Cambridge for Canada Day festivities on Parliament Hill in 2012, and "An Evening for Peace" for Her Majesty Queen Noor of Jordan in Montreal.

Nesrallah is the host of Tempo on CBC Music, Canada's national classical music program, and is the executive producer and star of Carmen on Tap, a company that performs Georges Bizet's opera Carmen as dinner theatre.

She was a recipient of the Canada Council for the Arts Emerging Artist Award & Mid-Career Grant, a grand prize winner of the Brian Law Opera Award, grand prize winner of the Arab Ambassador Awards, grand prize winner of the Cercle des Cents Associes Award, and winner of the Lebanese Canadian Chamber of Commerce Award.

== Discography ==
- Schafer: String Quartet No. 8, Theseus, Beauty and the Beast (2003), ATMA Classique ATMA 22201
- España (2004), with Daniel Bolshoy, guitar
- Panache (2007), with Caroline Léonardelli, harp
