= Pauline Donalda =

Canadian opera singer

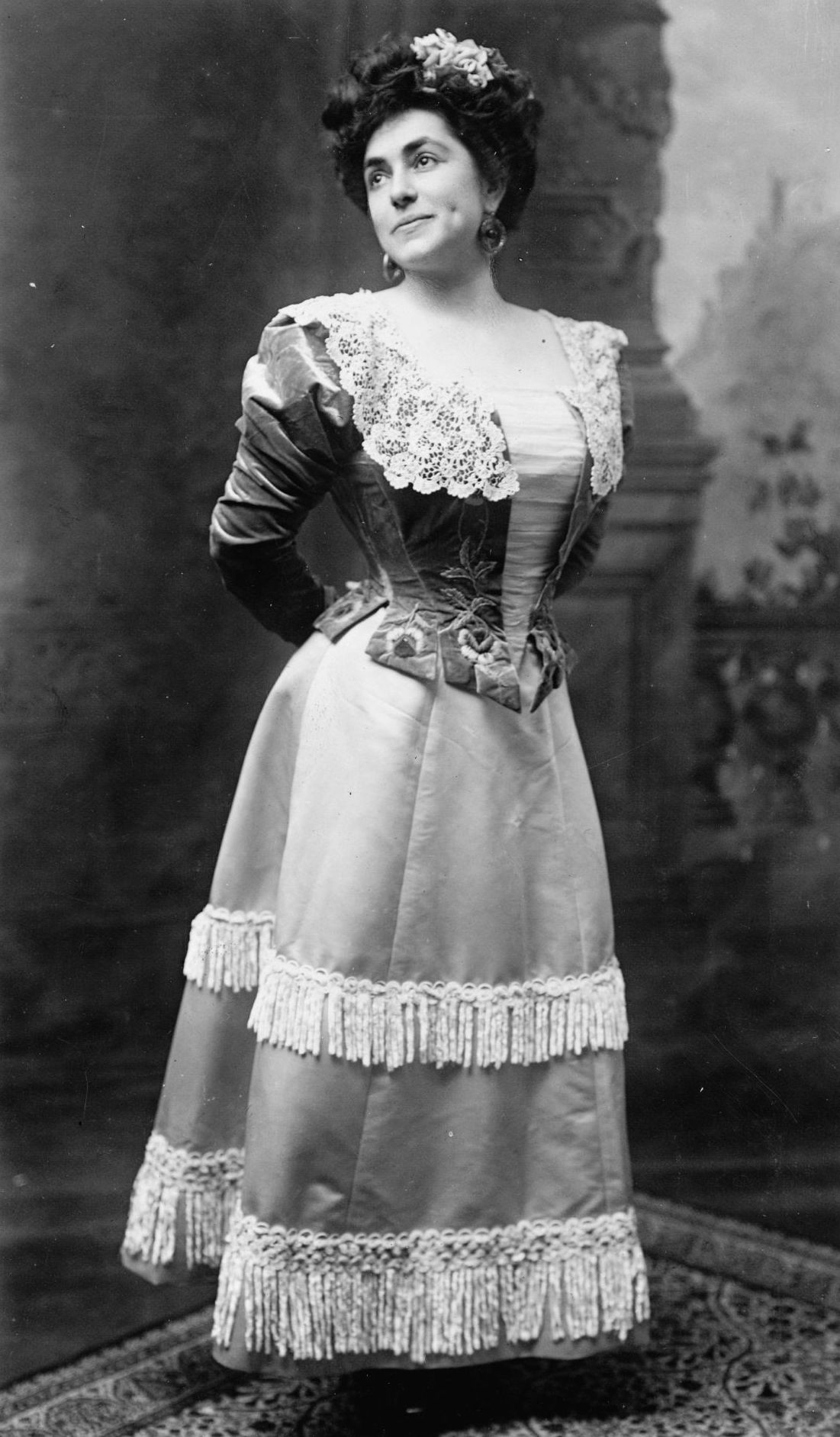
- Pauline Donalda, circa 1906

Background information
- Born: Pauline Lightstone; March 5, 1882; Montreal, Quebec, Canada
- Died: October 22, 1970 (aged 88) Montreal, Quebec
- Genres: Opera
- Occupation: Singer (soprano)
- Years active: 1905–1922

Pauline Donalda OC, born Pauline Lightstone, (March 5, 1882 – October 22, 1970) was a Canadian operatic soprano.

== Early life and education ==
Donalda was born Pauline Lightstone in Montreal, Quebec, the daughter of Jewish parents who changed their surname from Lichtenstein to Lightstone after immigrating from Russia and Poland. She was musical from an early age, playing the Queen in a children's production of Cinderella at age seven and winning her first singing prize at age ten from Royal Arthur School in Montréal. She studied with Clara Lichtenstein (no relation) at Royal Victoria College (RVC), part of McGill University.

In 1902, after being rebuffed by Metropolitan Opera Director Walter Damrosch, but encouraged by tenor Eustase Thomas-Salignac and others, she went to the Conservatoire de Paris on a grant from Donald Smith, Lord Strathcona, the patron of RVC. There, she studied voice with Edmond Duvernoy. She adopted the stage name Donalda in honour of her patron.

== Career and legacy ==
With the help of composer Jules Massenet, Donalda made her debut in 1904 in Nice, singing the title role in his opera Manon. The following year, she debuted in London, singing the role of Micaëla in Georges Bizet's Carmen. Donalda was the first to sing the roles of Concepción in Maurice Ravel's L'heure espagnole and Ah-joe in Franco Leoni's L'oracolo at Covent Garden. In November 1906, she returned to Montreal to sing in a recital at the Montreal Arena with her new husband, baritone Paul Seveilhac. The following month, she began a season with Oscar Hammerstein's new Manhattan Opera House. She returned to Europe in 1907, singing principally in London and Paris.

Donalda was in Canada when World War I broke out. She chose to remain in the country, singing in concerts and music halls, with occasional appearances in New York and Boston. In Montreal, she organized the Donalda Sunday Afternoon Concerts, donating the proceeds to war charities. She returned to Paris in 1917, and married her second husband, Mischa Léon, there the following year. Her final performance was as Concepcion in Maurice Ravel's L'heure espagnole.

In 1922, Donalda retired from performance and opened a teaching studio in Paris where she taught many students over the next few years. She moved back to Montreal in 1937 and opened a studio there. Her students in Montreal included Robert Savoie. She founded the Opera Guild of Montreal in 1942, serving as president and artistic director until 1969.

In 1967, she was made one of the first Officers of the Order of Canada "for her contribution to the arts, especially opera, as a singer and founder of the Opera Guild in Montreal."

In 2025, a film of her life by a relative, University of Aberdeen Professor Alan Marcus won Best Documentary and Best Editing at the Experimental Dance and Music Film Festival 2024 in Toronto and Best Classical Music film at the Buenos Aires 11th Music Film Festival 2025 as well as showing at ten international film festivals. A street in Pointe Au Tremble in Montreal is named after her
