= Opera Lyra Ottawa =

Canadian nonprofit opera company

Opera Lyra Ottawa (OLO) was a non-profit professional opera company based in Ottawa, Ontario, Canada. It was founded in 1984 by Canadian soprano Diana Gilchrist after the demise of the National Arts Centre's annual summer opera productions. The company performed fully staged and concert version operas in their original language with French and English surtitles at the National Arts Centre as well as running outreach and young artist programs. As of 14 October 2015, Opera Lyra had ceased operations.

A new company, New Opera Lyra, had its inaugural first season on 28–29 October 2022 (this company has no relationship to the original Opera Lyra Ottawa, merely appropriating the name of the former company).

== History ==
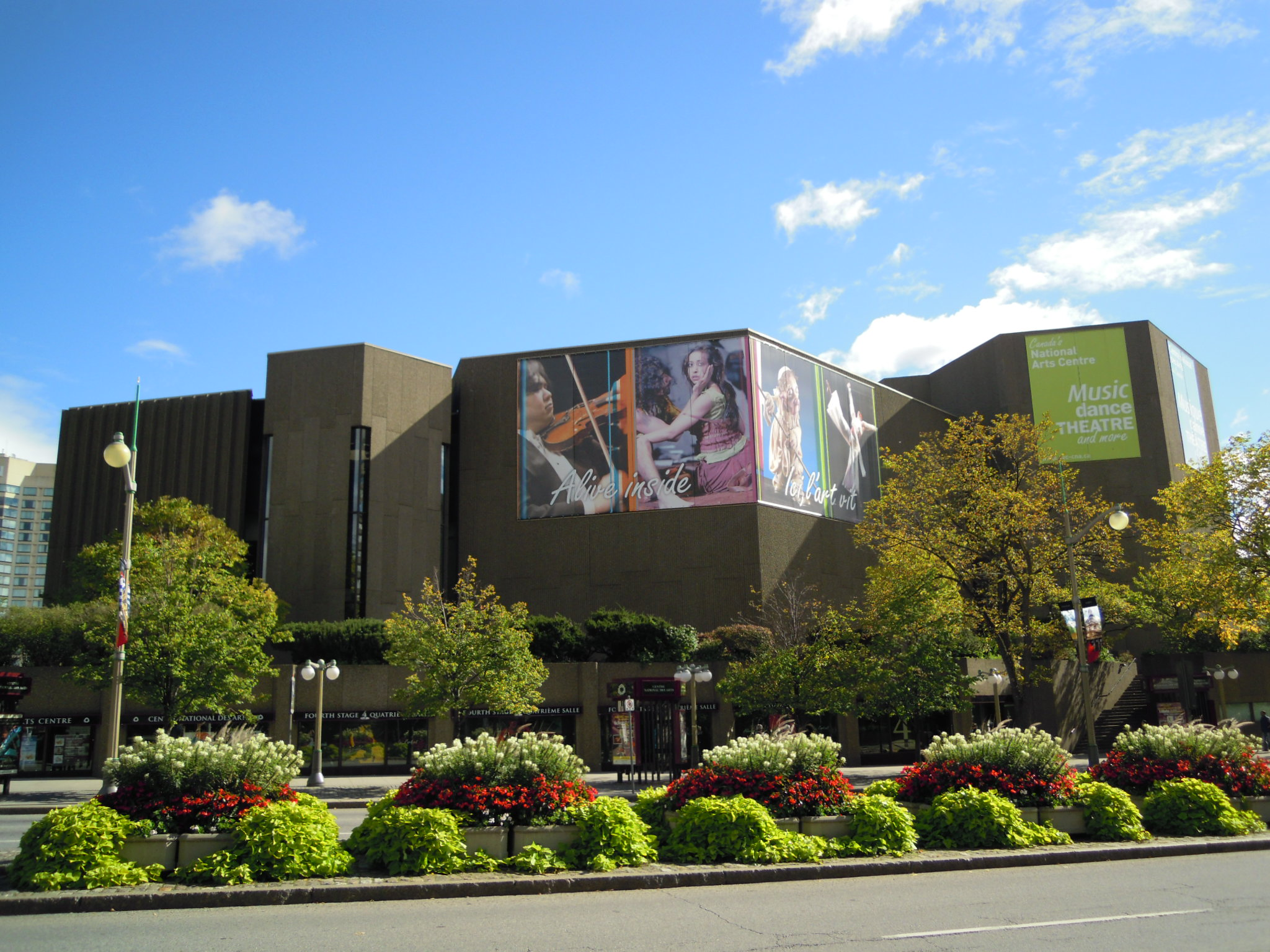
The National Arts Centre in Ottawa, Opera Lyra's main performing venue

The company was founded in 1984 in response to the National Arts Center's decision to end further opera productions due to budget constraints. Opera Lyra's founder and first Artistic Director was Diana Gilchrist, a young Canadian soprano at the very start of her career. Initially the company performed operas in chamber versions with piano accompaniment in the tiny York Street Theatre in Ottawa. Its first production was Mozart's The Impresario (in which Gilchrist sang Madame Silberklang as well as directing and producing the show). This was followed by Telemann's Pimpinone and the premiere of John Burge's chamber opera The Master's House which had been commissioned by Opera Lyra.

Their second season saw increased private funding and the company's first fully staged opera, Così fan tutte, performed in the Alumni Theatre at Carleton University. In 1986, the company moved into the National Arts Center's 897 seat Theatre, with a production of The Barber of Seville. 1987 was Gilchrist's fourth year as Artistic Director and her final opera at the NAC was The Elixir of Love, conducted by Dwight Bennett. Jeannette Aster became Artistic Director in 1987 when Gilchrist moved to Europe for professional engagements singing Queen of the Night, Zerbinetta and other coloratura roles. The 1990 production of Madama Butterfly marked the first time the company performed an opera in its original language with French and English surtitles. Prior to that, operas had been performed in English (and occasionally French) translation.

Later in 1990, the company for the first time presented a second fully staged opera in the same season, presenting Menotti's "Amahl and the Night Visitors" at the theatre of the Canadian Museum of Nature (reprised at the Canadian Museum of Civilization as the second production of the 1991/1992 season). Until 1992, the company continued to put on one fully staged opera per season at the NAC Theatre, augmented with the aforementioned production of "Amahl and the Night Visitors", operas performed in concert version and operatically themed concerts and soirées in other venues. Starting with the 1992/1993 season, the company gave two fully staged operas per season, and in 1993 moved into the NAC's larger 2,100 seat Southam Hall with a production of La Traviata. The company has used that venue ever since for its fully staged productions.

During Aster's tenure as Artistic Director, the company initiated outreach and community education programs and formed the beginnings of a training program with the founding of Opera Lyra Ottawa Boys' Choir. However, the company began experiencing financial difficulties after a series of expensive and poorly attended productions between 1996 and 1997 (Lucia di Lammermoor, Faust, Die Fledermaus, La Cenerentola, and Aida). Aster's contract was terminated six months before it was due to expire, and the company initiated a search for a new leader who would combine the roles of General Director and Artistic Director. Canadian conductor Tyrone Paterson, who had spent 12 years at Calgary Opera was appointed to the post in 1998.

Under Paterson's leadership, the company slowly recovered from its financial difficulties and improved its relations with the National Arts Centre. In 2002, the company won a Lieutenant Governor's Award for the Arts which were awarded annually between 1996 and 2003 to "recognize Ontario-based arts organizations for demonstrating exceptional private sector and community support, while maintaining a high level of artistic excellence." Tyrone also founded the Young Artists Training Programme which eventually became known as the OLO Opera Studio. With an increasing number of outside conducting engagements, Paterson stepped down from the administrative post of General Director in 2003, but remained the company's Artistic Director and Principal Conductor. Elizabeth Howarth took over as General Director.

The 2008 financial crisis and the Great Recession led to renewed financial difficulties over the next three years. In November 2011, the company was forced to retrench and cancel its productions of Tosca and The Flying Dutchman scheduled for the spring of 2012. The problems were compounded when it was discovered that a bookkeeper had stolen thousands of dollars from the company as well as from the Canadian Council of Archives. In July 2012, John Peter "Jeep" Jefferies, who had previously been the Executive Director of Tulsa Opera, was appointed as the company's new General Director. Opera Lyra reopened in September of that year with a fully staged production of La Bohème and a concert version of La Traviata scheduled for March 2013.

Amongst the notable singers who have appeared with the company in the past are Richard Margison (La Bohème 1988, Turandot 2010), Louis Quilico (Rigoletto 1994), Liping Zhang (Madama Butterfly 2004), Russell Braun (Faust 1996, Eugene Onegin 2008), James Westman (Le Nozze Di Figaro 2009 and 2015, Madama Butterfly 2014), and Michael Schade (Manon 2010).

== Governance and finance ==
Opera Lyra Ottawa was a registered charity, governed by a volunteer Board of Directors with an Advisory Council and an Executive Committee. Its Patron is Beverley McLachlin, Chief Justice of Canada. According to the company, approximately 40% of the cost for presenting a mainstage opera is covered by ticket sales. Government and foundation grants, including ones from the City of Ottawa, Canada Council for the Arts, and the Ontario Arts Council, contribute another 30%. The remainder is met through individual and corporate donations. The OLO Guild assists with the company's fundraising activities.
