= Joel Quarrington =

Canadian double bass player

Joel Andrew Quarrington CM (born January 15, 1955) is a Canadian double bass player, soloist and teacher. He is the former Principal Double Bass of the London Symphony Orchestra.

== Career ==
He was born in Toronto, Ontario, and began playing the double bass at the age of eleven in order to complete a bluegrass trio with his brothers, Paul Quarrington and Tony Quarrington. At the age of thirteen, he began to study with Thomas Monohan, who was at the time the principal bassist of the Toronto Symphony Orchestra. After he received a degree in music from the University of Toronto, he went on to Austria and Italy to study under two renowned double bass pedagogues, respectively Ludwig Streicher and Franco Petracchi.

Quarrington has won numerous music competitions, including first prize in the CBC talent festival in 1976, and second prize in the Geneva International Music Competition in 1978 (first prize was not awarded that year). He played as principal bass with the Hamilton Philharmonic Orchestra between 1979 and 1988, and the Canadian Opera Company between 1989 and 1991, and then proceeded to become principal bass of the Toronto Symphony Orchestra. Since September 2006, he has been the Principal Bass of the National Arts Centre Orchestra and he became Principal Bass of the London Symphony Orchestra in 2013.

Quarrington plays on a 1630 Giovanni Paolo Maggini double bass, and is well known for his unusual practice of tuning his bass in intervals of fifths, like a cello, but an octave lower.

His wife is cellist Carole Sirois who has played in the Montreal Symphony Orchestra, the Toronto Symphony and the National Arts Centre Orchestra and is presently a professor at the Conservatoire de Musique in Montreal.

Joel Quarrington teaches at the University of Ottawa and is a Visiting Artist at the Royal Academy of Music in London. Throughout his career, Quarrington has been active in commissioning new works for Double Bass. A notable commission in 1997 was for Raymond Luedeke's Concerto for Double Bass and Orchestra.

He was appointed as a Member of the Order of Canada in 2023. He currently resides in Hatley, Quebec (township).
