= Squallis Puppeteers =

The Squallis Puppeteers are a Louisville, Kentucky based puppetry troupe. The troupe was founded by Jess Myers, Nora, and Carrie Christenson in 1997. Their performances include a yearly Fool's Day Bash, held on April Fools' Day. They became a non-profit organization in 2003. Squallis uses donations, grants, and everyday materials to form together huge, creative, 7-feet-tall extravagant puppets as well as puppet shows.

On the first Saturday of every month, Squallis opens its doors to the public, where they offer a family-friendly environment, puppet performance, and a kids puppet making workshop.

== Puppets made by Squallis ==
Large Puppets

- Owl
- Giraffe
- Cyclopes
- Abe Lincoln
- Bear
- Skeleton

These puppets are visible to the public at different times throughout the seasons. They are featured at the Louisville Zoo, band performances, and some of Squallis's partnership programs as well.

== See also ==
- List of attractions and events in the Louisville metropolitan area
