= Marguerita Spencer =

Marguerita "Rita" Spencer (December 28, 1892 – May 5, 1993) was a Canadian pianist, organist, composer and educator.

She was born Marguerita MacQuarrie in Glace Bay, Nova Scotia and studied music there and at the Halifax Ladies' College, where she studied organ, piano and cello. She then studied nursing at the Toronto General Hospital, graduating in 1921. In 1922, she married Roy Aubrey Spencer; the couple moved to Saskatoon, where her husband taught engineering at the University of Saskatchewan. Spencer continued her musical education there, studying with Lyell Gustin, and also earned a Licentiate in Music from McGill University.

During World War I, she played accompaniment for silent movies; she also played concerts for troops during both World Wars. Spencer performed on CBC radio and played with the Saskatoon Symphony Orchestra.

Her compositions include Prairie Suite No. 1 and 24 Preludes. She experienced sight problems later in life and used a tape recorder and transcriber.

In 1986, she was the subject of a CBC television documentary.

Spencer died in Saskatoon at the age of 100.
