= Marvin Duchow =

Canadian composer, teacher and musicologist

Marvin Duchow (June 10, 1914 – May 24, 1979) was a Canadian composer, teacher and musicologist who lived and worked in Montreal, Quebec. He was an expert on Renaissance music and the music of eighteenth century France. The McGill University Music Library in Montreal is named after him, as is the Duchow String Quartet.

== Early life and education ==
Duchow was born in Montreal, Quebec. He began studying music theory in 1933 with Claude Champagne at the McGill Conservatory, and took private lessons in composition. After graduating with a Bachelor of Music, from 1937 to 1939 he attended the Curtis Institute, where he studied composition with Rosario Scalero and music criticism with Samuel Chotzinoff. He then attended New York University, while supporting himself by teaching.

== Career ==
Duchow taught music at several schools while completing his education at New York University. He then returned to Montreal, where he taught at the Conservatoire de musique de Montréal and, beginning in 1944, at McGill University. From 1957 to 1963 he was the dean of McGill's Faculty of Music. Among his notable students was composer Alan Belkin and Andrew Homzy https://homzy.ca - a jazz musician/musicologist who wrote the first dissertation on jazz accepted at a Canadian university - https://escholarship.mcgill.ca/concern/theses/79407z60q..

Duchow composed a number of choral works, beginning in the 1930s. In the 1950s he was an associate editor of The Canadian Music Journal, to which he contributed scholarly articles.

The Marvin Duchow Memorial Scholarship was established in his name.

== Works ==
- Songs of My Youth, Liedzyklus, 1930
- Variations on a Chorale Orchestral, 1936
- For a Rose's Sake, 1938
- Motet, 1938
- Seven Chorale Preludes in Traditional Style Organ (music), 1939
- Quartet in C Minor, 1939, 1942
- A Carol Choir, 1943
- Badinerie for Piano and Orchestra, 1947
- Chant intime (Prelude) for Piano, 1947
- Sonata for Piano, 1955
- Movement for Strings (Largamente), 1972
- Three Songs of the Holocaust/ Trois Chants de l'Holocaust Nelly Sachs writing from 1977 is involved in it.
