= Bruce Mather =

Canadian composer

- Born: May 9, 1939 (age 87); Toronto, Canada
- Occupations: Composer, pianist, teacher, writer
- Spouse: Pierrette LePage

Bruce Mather (born May 9, 1939) is a Canadian composer, pianist, teacher, and writer who is particularly known for his contributions to contemporary classical music.

== Career ==
One of the most notable composers of microtonal music, he was awarded the Jules Léger Prize twice, first in 1979 for his Musique pour Champigny and again in 1993 for Yquem. Some of his other awards include the Composers, Authors and Publishers Association of Canada's Micheline Coulombe Saint-Marcoux prize in 1987 for Barbaresco and the Serge Garant Prize from the Émile Nelligan Foundation in 2000.

Mather is an associate of the Canadian Music Centre and a member of the Canadian League of Composers. As a writer he has contributed works to numerous musical journals and publications, including authoring the articles on Serge Garant, François Morel, and Gilles Tremblay in the Dictionary of Contemporary Music. He has taught on the music faculties of the University of Toronto (1964–1966), the University of Montreal (1970–1973), the Paris Conservatoire (1978–1979) and McGill University (1966–2001). His notable pupils include Marc Patch, Peter Allen, John Burke, Paul Crawford, Jacques Desjardins, José Evangelista, Anthony Genge, Richard Hunt, Denis Lorrain, John Oliver, Nicole Rodrigue, François Rose, Ronald Bruce Smith, Donald Steven, and Alexander Tilley.

As a pianist Mather has displayed a strong commitment to performing new music by himself and by other contemporary composers. He has performed in many major performance venues and music festivals, often appearing with his wife, pianist Pierrette LePage, in duo-piano works. The husband and wife team have also partnered on several recordings. He served as director of the Société de musique contemporaine du Québec from 1966–1981 and later served as treasurer.

== Education ==
Born in Toronto, Mather began composing music as a young child. At the age of 10 he won a prize in the 1949 Composers, Authors and Publishers Association of Canada composition competition. In 1952 he entered the Royal Conservatory of Music where he studied piano with Alberto Guerrero, Earle Moss, and Alexander Uninsky and music theory and composition with Godfrey Ridout, Oskar Morawetz, and John Weinzweig. In 1957 he matriculated to the University of Toronto where he earned a Bachelor of Music degree in 1959.

Mather attended the Aspen Music Festival and School in the summers of 1957 and 1958 through a scholarship provided by the Women's Musical Club of Toronto and the Beta Sigma Phi sorority. While there Alexander Uninsky introduced the young composer to Darius Milhaud and Milhaud quickly became one of his more important mentors. He continued to study with Milhaud and with Simone Plé-Caussade, Lazare Lévy, and Olivier Messiaen at the Paris Conservatoire from 1959-1961. In 1964 he received a Master of Music from Stanford University where he was a pupil of Leland Smith and Roy Harris, and in 1967 he earned a Doctor of Music from the University of Toronto.

== Music ==
Mather is a composer of orchestral, chamber, vocal, and piano works. A disciple of Ivan Wyschnegradsky, his music often employs microtonal scales. Though he was distrustful towards microtonal music after hearing Alois Hába's works, his meeting with Wyschnegradsky in the seventies was crucial for his aesthetic and his use of microtonal scales. As a pianist, he and his pianist wife, Pierrette LePage, have performed many of Wyschnegradsky's pieces.

As a composer Mather employs Wyschnegrasky's principle of non-octavic spaces. He wrote many works using this technique, notably in his Poème du délire (Poem of Delirium), a tribute to Alexander Scriabin (as a reference to his Poem of Ecstasy and Poem of Fire) who influenced both Mather and Wyschnegradsky. Mather's compositions are also strongly influenced by his love of poetry and wine.

== Works ==
=== Stage ===
- La princesse blanche (opera), 2 sopranos, baritone, bass, small orchestra (16 players), 1993

=== Orchestral ===
- Concerto, piano, small orchestra, 1958;
- Elegy, alto saxophone, string orchestra, 1959 (also arranged for alto saxophone, piano);
- Symphonic Ode, 1964;
- Orchestral Piece 1967, large orchestra, 1966–67;
- Ombres, 1967;
- Music for Vancouver, small orchestra (16-17 players), 1969;
- Musique pour Rouen, 12 strings, 1971;
- Musigny, large orchestra (89 players), 1980;
- Scherzo, small orchestra (18 players), 1987–88;
- Dialogue pour Trio Basso et Orchestre, viola, cello, double bass, orchestra, 1988;
- Tallbrem Variations, 5 percussion, orchestra, 1994;
- Quarts de Chaume, string orchestra, 1998

=== Chamber music ===
- Sonata, violin, piano, 1957;
- Elegy, alto saxophone, piano, 1959 (arrangement of work for alto saxophone, string orchestra);
- Étude, clarinet, 1962;
- Music for Organ, Horn and Gongs, 1973;
- Mandola, mandolin, piano, 1974;
- Eine kleine Bläsermusik, flute, oboe, clarinet, French horn, bassoon, 1975;
- Clos de Vougeot, 4 percussion, 1977;
- Ausone:
  - Version A, flute, 1979;
  - Version B, flute, 2 harps, 1979;
  - Version C, flute, 2 harps, 2 guitars, 2 violins, 2 violas, 2 celli, 1979;
- Coulée de serrant, harp, piano, 1980;
- Sassicaia, clarinet, piano, 1981; Gattinara, viola, percussion, 1982;
- Elegy, flute (+ alto flute), cello, piano, percussion, 1983;
- Barbaresco, viola, cello, double bass, 1984;
- Clos de l'Audignac, marimba, 3 percussion, 1984;
- Senorio de Sarria, 2 guitars (tuned a quarter-tone apart), 1985;
- Vouvray, oboe, harp, 1986;
- Viola Duet, 2 violas, 1987;
- Vega Sicilia, guitar, ensemble (harp, viola, cello, marimba), 1989;
- Yquem, 4 pianos, 4 ondes Martenot, 1991;
- Romance, bassoon, synthesizer, 1992;
- Standing Wave, clarinet, cello, piano, percussion, 1994;
- Advanced Harmony, wind ensemble, 1995;
- Quintette, clarinet, string quartet, 1995;
- Duo basso, bass flute, bass oboe, 1996;
- Quatre Études, cimbalom, marimba, 1996;
- Tempranillo, specially-tuned guitar, 1997;
- Hoya de Cadenas, alto flute, quarter-tone guitar, 1997;
- Doisy Daëne, flute, piano, 1997;
- Quinta da Camarate, specially-tuned guitar, 1998;
- Violin Duet, 2 violins, 1998;
- Bourgueil, clarinet, violin, cello, piano, percussion, 1999;
- Quintet for Saxophones and Piano, 1999;
- Sancerre, harp, harpsichord, 1999;
- Four Études, 6 percussion, 2001
- In memoriam Bengt Hambraeus, theorbo, 2001
- Trio, violin, cello, piano, 2002
- Deux Pièces pour Ondes Martenot et piano en seizièmes de ton, sixteenth-tone piano, Ondes Martenot, 2004
- 65 Takte für Robert Aitken, 2 flutes, 2004
- Music for San Francisco, cello, ensemble (oboe, French horn, specially-tuned harp, violin, viola, piano), 2005
- For Amie Watson, vibraphone, tubular bells, 13 cowbells (1 player), 2006

=== Choral ===
- Lament for Pasiphaë, soprano, baritone, small mixed chorus, orchestra, 1962;
- Counting the Beats, soprano, baritone, small mixed chorus, orchestra, 1962;
- La lune mince… (text by Paul Valéry), divided mixed chorus, 1965;
- Two Stanford Songs, mixed chorus, 1988

=== Vocal ===
- Two Songs, bass-baritone, orchestra, 1956;
- Venice, soprano, clarinet, cello, piano, 1957;
- Lost Love, soprano, string orchestra, 1958;
- The Finding of Love, soprano, string orchestra, 1958;
- Cycle Rilke, tenor, guitar, 1959;
- The Song of Blodeuwedd, baritone, orchestra (harp, piano, timpani, percussion, strings), 1961;
- Sick Love, soprano, orchestra, 1961;
- Orphée (text by Paul Valéry), soprano, piano, percussion, 1963;
- Madrigal I (text by Hector de Saint-Denys Garneau), soprano, alto, flute, harp, mandolin, violin, cello, 1967;
- Madrigal II (text by Hector de Saint-Denys Garneau), soprano, alto, flute, harp, violin, viola, cello, 1968;
- Madrigal III (text by Hector de Saint-Denys Garneau), alto, harp, piano, marimba, 1971;
- Madrigal V (text by Hector de Saint-Denys Garneau), soprano, alto, small orchestra (17 players), 1973, revised 1980;
- Au château de Pompairain, mezzo-soprano, orchestra, 1976;
- Musique pour Champigny, soprano, mezzo-soprano, alto, B-flat clarinet, French horn, harp, piano, percussion, 1976 (Winner, Jules *Léger Prize for New Chamber Music, 1979);
- Les grandes fontaines (text by Anne Hébert), soprano, piano, 1981;
- Un cri qui durerait la mer (text by Marie France Rose), bass-baritone, piano, 1985;
- Travaux de nuit, baritone, piano, 1990 (also arranged for baritone, orchestra, 1990);
- Des laines de lumière (text by Gatien Lapointe), bass-baritone, 2 quarter-tone pianos, 1996;
- La voix d'oiseau, coloratura soprano, piano, 1998;
- Trois Poèmes de Gatien Lapointe, voice, piano, 1998;
- Onze Poèmes pour la main gauche, soprano, piano, 2000

=== Piano ===
- Smaragdin, 1960;
- Like Snow, 1960;
- Mystras, 1962;
- Fantasy, 1964;
- Sonata, 2 pianos, 1969–70;
- In memoriam Alexander Uninsky, 1974;
- Régime 11, Type A, 2 pianos (tuned a quarter-tone apart), 1978;
- Poème du délire, 3 specially-tuned pianos, 1982;
- Hommage à Carrillo, sixteenth-tone piano, 1996;
- D'après un cri, 1996;
- Régime 17, third-tone piano, 1997;
- Eight Études, sixteenth-tone piano, 2000
- In memoriam Gordon Sheppard, sixteenth-tone piano, 2 pianos (tuned a quarter-tone apart), 2006
- Hommage à Wyschnegradsky, 2009

=== Organ ===
- Six Études, 1982;
- Études Nos. 7-8, 1993
- Ardennes, 2002
- Cinq Pièces faciles, organ 4 hands, 2002

=== Harpsichord ===
- Saumur, quarter-tone harpsichord, 1990

=== Electroacoustic ===
- Madrigal IV (text by Hector de Saint-Denys Garneau), soprano, flute, piano, tape, 1972;
- Barolo, cello, tape, 1977;
- Aux victimes de la guerre de Vendée (1793), French horn, 2 pianos, tape, 1990
