= Silvio Palmieri =

Canadian composer (1957–2018)

- Born: 10 November 1957
- Died: 22 October 2018 (aged 60)
- Era: Contemporary

Silvio Palmieri (10 November 1957 – 22 October 2018) was a Canadian composer. He was born in LaSalle, Quebec.

== Early life and education ==
Silvio Palmieri received his musical training at the Conservatoire de musique du Québec à Montréal. He studied composition and analysis with Gilles Tremblay, counterpoint and orchestration with Clermont Pépin, and electroacoustics with Micheline Coulombe Saint-Marcoux and Yves Daoust.

== Life and career ==
His repertoire consists of various genres : he notably composed an opera : Elia (commissioned by the Ensemble de musique contemporaine); Flak, for choreographer José Navas and his dance company; many pieces for piano and chamber orchestra; soundtracks for movies, videos and plays, such as Hamlet, presented at Théâtre du Nouveau Monde in 2011 (Marc Béland, dir.). His works have been performed by the Ensemble contemporain de Montréal, Vox Novus, Les Événements du neuf (Lorraine Vaillancourt, dir.), Quebec Contemporary Music Society, Ensemble Baroque de Montreal, Ensemble d'ondes de Montréal, Natalie Choquette, Molinari String Quartet, Claudel String Quartet, André Ristic, Louise Bessette, Alain Trudel, the Ensemble de flûtes Alizé, Chantal Lambert, Angela Tosheva.

He died of cancer in 2018 at the age of 60.

== Compositions ==
- Versetti, trio pour soprano, clarinette et piano (2003)
- Versetto, concerto pour violon et orchestre à cordes (2003)
- Elia, opéra en un acte (2004)
- Come in un film di... Quatuor à cordes no.1 (2008)
- Prélude XI: Elevazione (Disperate vibrazioni raschiano il silenzio) pour piano (2010)
- Musique de scène pour Hamlet de William Shakespeare ( mise en scène de Marc Béland-TNM) (2011)
