= Nicole Rodrigue =

Canadian composer and film editor

Nicole Rodrigue (29 September 1943 – 16 April 2010) was a Canadian composer and film editor who was the first woman to earn a composition degree from McGill University.

== Life and career ==
Rodrigue was born in Montreal, Canada, the youngest of 11 children. She began studying piano when she was 10 years old, and went on to earn degrees from the Ecole de Musique Vincent d'Indy and the University of Montreal. In 1974, she became the first woman to earn a master's degree in composition from McGill University. Her teachers included Istvan Anhalt, Francoise Aubut-Pratte, J. P. Couture, Alcides Lanza, Bruce Mather, Paul Pedersen, A. Prevost, and Serge Garant. Rodrigue participated in the Jeunesses Musicales International in Belgium and also studied in Darmstadt, Germany, where her composition Nasca premiered.

Rodrigue was interested in electronic music and experimented with Music Mouse, software created by the American composer Laurie Spiegel. In 1973, she edited the short film Quoi de Neuf a Pie IX? From 1970 to 1998, Rodrigue taught at the School Commission of Montreal and wrote a pedagogical guide.

Rodrigue's compositions were recorded by the Composers, Authors and Publishers Association of Canada (CAPAC QC 1274) and printed by the Canadian Music Centre (CMC). Her papers are archived at the University of Calgary and the Bibliothèque et Archives nationales du Québec. Her works include:

== Chamber ==
- Desastre
- Fission (two percussion)
- Le Moqueur (violin, cello, piano)
- Le Moqueur Polyglotte (flute)
- Modules (harp, double bass, seven tam tams)
- Nasca (clarinet, cello, piano and vibraphone)
- Soufriere (two flutes and two piccolos)
- Two Atmospheres (chamber ensemble)

== Multimedia ==
- Toi (harp and visual montage)

== Piano ==
- Babillage (Chatter)
- Evocations Suite
- L'oie Blanche Suite

== Vocal ==
- Hommage a Fernando (flute, violin, piano and narrator; text by Benoit Lacroix)
- Laudes: Requiem (chorus and chamber ensemble)
- Sequence: Fureur. . . (a capella mixed chorus)
