= Kat Sandler =

Canadian playwright and theatre director

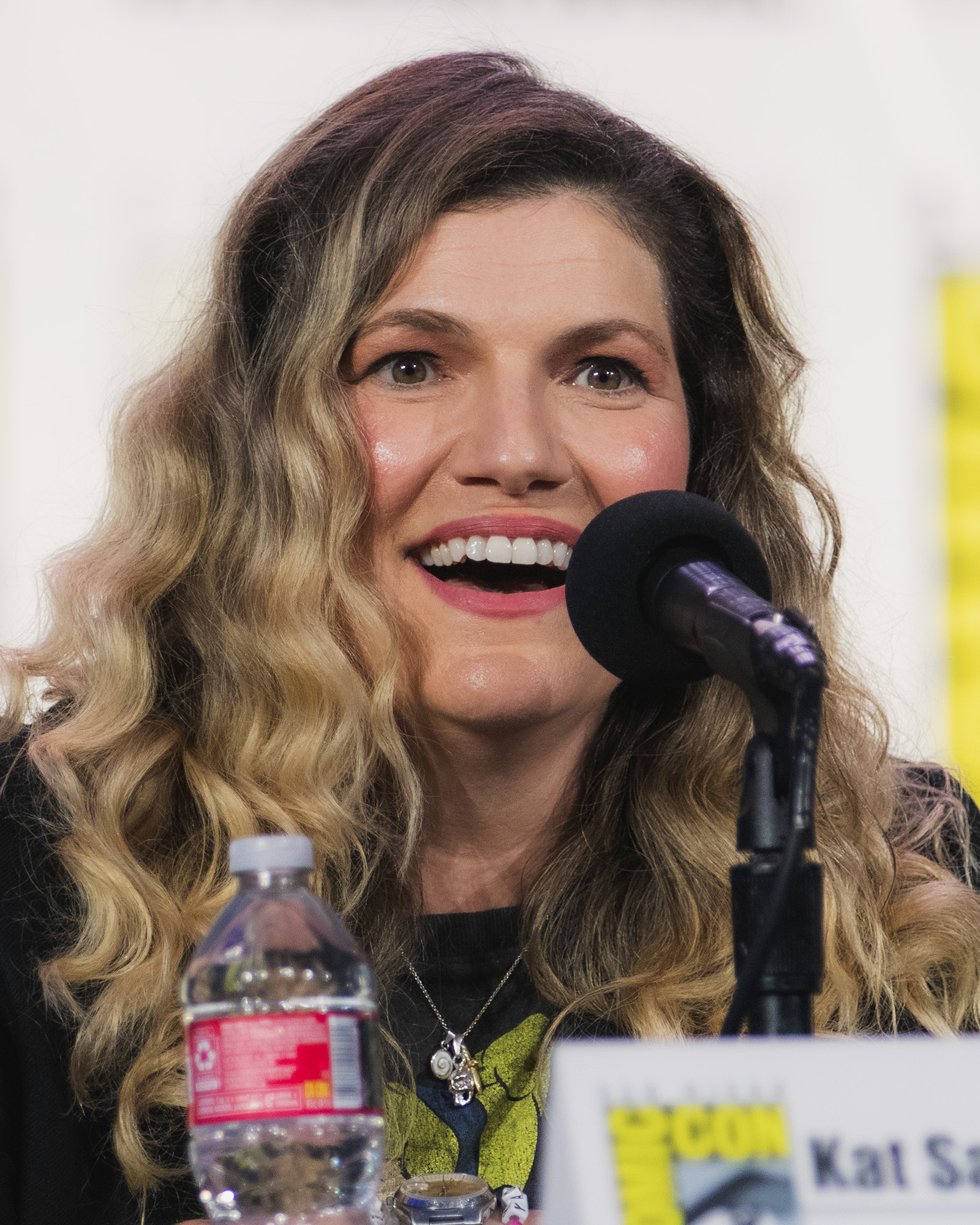
- Sandler in 2026
- Born: Katherine Sandler; Toronto, Ontario, Canada
- Education: Queen's University at Kingston
- Occupation: Playwright
- Years active: 2008–present
- Notable work: Mustard; Yaga
- Awards: Dora Mavor Moore Award

Katherine Sandler is a Canadian playwright and theatre director. She is the co-founder and artistic director of Theatre Brouhaha in Toronto, where she staged a number of her plays. Her notable works include the Dora Mavor Moore Award-winning play Mustard (2016) and the television series Yaga (2026), which she adapted from her 2019 play of the same name.

== Early life and education ==
Sandler was born in Toronto and grew up in the Cabbagetown neighbourhood. Her mother, Ann MacNaughton, was a screenwriter for Canadian television shows including Traders and E.N.G., and her father, Jerry Sandler, had also worked in the film industry. She attended secondary school at the University of Toronto Schools in the class of 2004. She wrote and directed her own musical as her final school project. She then studied theatre at the Dan School of Drama and Music at Queen's University, graduating in 2008.

== Career ==
After university, Sandler worked with Theatre Gargantua in Toronto and acted in their productions of Fibber (2008) and Imprints (2011). She considers herself to be primarily a playwright and director, and she has directed many of her own plays. In 2010, Sandler and her Queens University classmate Tom McGee founded Theatre Brouhaha, which she described as "theatre for a younger generation", with "slick, fast-paced plays that are marketed like television". The company's first production was her play Lovesexmoney in 2011.

Sandler won the New Play Contest at the Toronto Fringe Festival with Help Yourself in 2012. In 2016, she was awarded the Dora Mavor Moore Award for Outstanding New Play for Mustard. She had developed the play, about a troubled teenager's imaginary friend, at the Tarragon Theatre's Playwrights Unit.

Late Night, originally written by Sandler for the 24-hour playwriting contest at the Toronto Fringe, was produced in 2016 by Moses Znaimer of ZoomerMedia. The play was staged in a television studio to resemble the taping of a late-night talk show in front of a live audience. It was recorded and later broadcast on VisionTV.

Sandler was commissioned to write a pair of plays for the Citadel in Edmonton, Alberta, by the theatre's artistic director, Daryl Cloran. In 2019, the two political farces, The Party and The Candidate, were performed simultaneously by the same cast on different stages in the theatre complex.

Yaga, a reimagining of the myth of Baba Yaga, debuted at the Tarragon Theatre in 2019, starring Seana McKenna in multiple roles, including a university professor with "a taste for younger men". The story blends folklore with a whodunit, following a detective investigating the disappearance of a student who interviewed the professor about Baba Yaga. Sandler adapted the play into a television series of the same name for the Canadian streaming service Crave, and she was also the showrunner for production in 2026. The series premiered on October 23, 2026.

Sandler premiered Wildwoman, a play inspired by the origin story of Beauty and the Beast, at the Soulpepper Theatre in 2023. She adapted the classic children's novel Anne of Green Gables by Lucy Maud Montgomery into a play for the Stratford Festival's 2025 season.

== Works ==
=== Theatre ===
Year	Title	Writer	Director	Notes	Ref.
2011	Lovesexmoney	Yes	Yes		
2012	Help Yourself	Yes	Yes		
2012	Delicacy	Yes	Yes		
2013	Rock	Yes	Yes		
2013	The Unseen Hand	No	Yes	Play by Sam Shepard (1969)	
2013	We Are the Bomb	Yes	Yes		
2013	Will	Yes	No	Part of You Can Sleep When You're Dead; directed by Michael Orlando	
2013	Sucker	Yes	Yes		
2014	Cockfight	Yes	Yes		
2014	Punch Up	Yes	Yes		
2014	Retreat	Yes	Yes		
2014	Avaricious	Yes	No	Contributing writer; directed by Jacquie P.A. Thomas	
2015	Liver	Yes	Yes		
2015	Big Plans	No	Yes	Play by Jeremy Taylor	
2016	Late Night	Yes	Yes		
2016	Mustard	Yes	No	Directed by Ashlie Corcoran	
2016	Bright Lights	Yes	Yes		
2017	The End of the World Club	Yes	Yes	Collaboration with Dan School of Drama and Music students	
2018	Bang Bang	Yes	Yes		
2019	The Party; The Candidate	Yes	Yes	Simultaneous double bill; co-directed with Daryl Cloran	
2019	Yaga	Yes	Yes		
2020	Morro and Jasp: Save the Date	No	Yes	Created by Amy Lee and Heather Marie Annis; co-directed with Byron Laviolette	
2023	Wildwoman	Yes	Yes		
2024	Interior Design	No	Yes	Play by Rosa Labordé	
2024	Big Stuff	Yes	Yes	Co-written with Matt Baram and Naomi Snieckus	
2025	Anne of Green Gables	Yes	Yes	Based on the novel by Lucy Maud Montgomery	

=== Television ===
Year	Title	Credits	Notes	Ref.
2017	Kim's Convenience	Writer	Season 2, episode 5: "Date Night"	
2017	Kim's Convenience	Story editor	Season 2, 4 episodes	
2020	Late Night	Writer; Director	Hybrid play and TV production	
2023	Less Than Kosher	Story editor	7-episode TV series	
2026–present	Yaga	Creator; Writer; Showrunner	8-episode TV series	

=== Podcasts ===
Year	Title	Credits	Notes	Ref.
2016	How to Build a Fire	Writer	6-episode radio play for the Koffler Centre of the Arts	
2018	Limetown	Writer	Season 2, episode 4: "The Bridge"	
2020	Blue Rare	Writer	Part of The Quarantine Chronicles from CBC's PlayMe	
2022	You Can't Get There From Here	Writer; Director	Volume 2, episode 5: "The Artists"; a Factory Theatre production	
