= Alcides Lanza =

Canadian composer, conductor, pianist and music educator (1929–2024)

- Born: June 2, 1929; Rosario, Santa Fe Province, Argentina
- Died: July 17, 2024 (aged 95); Montreal, Quebec, Canada
- Occupations: Composer, conductor, pianist, music educator
- Spouse: Meg Sheppard

Alcides Emigdio Lanza CM (June 2, 1929 – July 17, 2024) was an Argentine-born Canadian composer, conductor, pianist, and music educator. As both a composer and performer he was known as an exponent of contemporary classical music and avant-garde music. His works often utilize a combination of traditional and unusual instruments, and incorporate electronic sounds and extensions. Many of his compositions are published by Boosey & Hawkes, and Lanza himself owned his own publishing company, Shelan Editions. He was an associate of the Canadian Music Centre, a member of the Canadian League of Composers, and an Honorary Member of the Canadian Electroacoustic Community. In 2019 Lanza was named a Member of the Order of Canada.

Lanza died on July 17, 2024, at the age of 95.

== Background ==
Born in Rosario, Santa Fe, Lanza received his initial musical training in Buenos Aires where he was a pupil of Julián Bautista (music composition), Ruwin Erlich (piano), Alberto Ginastera (composition), and Roberto Kinsky (conducting). He received a scholarship from the Torcuato di Tella Institute in 1963-1964 which enabled him to pursue advanced studies in music composition and electronic music. He received further grants from the Ford Foundation (1966) and the Pan American Union (1967–1969) and was awarded a Guggenheim Fellowship (1965). All of these enabled him to pursue further training in the United States with such teachers as Olivier Messiaen, Riccardo Malipiero, Aaron Copland, Bruno Maderna, and Yvonne Loriod.

== Career ==
From 1959 to 1965, Lanza was a pianist and vocal coach at the Teatro Colón in Buenos Aires. He also served as the President of Agrupacion Música Viva during that time. While studying in the United States during the late 1960s he worked at the Columbia-Princeton Electronic Music Center with Vladimir Ussachevsky. In 1971 he moved to Canada, joining the music faculty of McGill University in the city of Montreal. From 1974 to 2003 he was the director of that school's prestigious Electronic Music Studio. Among his notable pupils are composers Peter Allen, Eli-Eri Moura, Nicole Rodrigue, and John Burke.

In 1972 Lanza became the director of the Société de musique contemporaine du Québec (SMCQ), remaining in that role for only a short time. The SMCQ later commissioned him to write Plectros IV which was premiered in 1975 by the piano duo of Bruce Mather and Pierrette LePage. In 1972-1973 he was composer-in-residence at the German Academic Exchange Service in Berlin and he gave recital tours in Scandinavia and Germany. He went on to found the Composers/Performers Group, an organization that garnered much controversy among critics for its multimedia presentations in cities such as New York and Montreal.

In 1986 he toured Argentina and Brazil with his wife, actress and singer Meg Sheppard, presenting concerts of Canadian music. He was an honorary member of the Colegio de Compositores Latinoamericanos de Música de Arte, founded by the Mexican composer Manuel de Elías.

In 2003, the Canada Council for the Arts named Alcides Lanza as a winner of the 2003 Victor Martyn Lynch-Staunton Award, recognizing his career accomplishments as a composer.

The Lanza portrait in the Canadian Composers Portraits series was released in 2007.

At a ceremony in Madrid, Lanza received the 2014 SGAE Tomás Luis de Victoria Prize for Ibero-American Music, recognizing his compositional career and his contribution to the dissemination of Ibero-American music.
