= Jules Léger Prize for New Chamber Music =

Canadian music award

The Jules Léger Prize for New Chamber Music is a Canadian contemporary classical music award given to composers in recognition of quality new works of chamber music. Granted annually since 1978 (with the exception of 1984 and 1990 when no prize was given), the prize is won through a competition administered by the Canadian Music Centre. Prior to 1991, the competition had been administered by the Canadian Music Council.

== History ==
The Jules Léger Prize was founded by Canadian diplomat and statesman Jules Léger in 1978 with the purpose "to encourage Canadian composers to write for chamber music ensembles and to foster the performance of Canadian music by these groups." Works which are eligible for competition must be written for no more than twelve performers and no less than two. Any Canadian citizen and anyone who has lived on Canadian soil for over a year is eligible to compete in the competition. Composers who are awarded the prize receive a trophy designed by the Canadian sculptor Louis Archambault, a cash award (currently $7,500), and a concert performance of the winning work by leading Canadian musicians (most of these concerts have also been broadcast on CBC Radio).

== Winners ==
Year	Composer	Work
1978	R. Murray Schafer	String Quartet No. 2 'Waves'
1979	Bruce Mather	Musique pour Champigny
1980	Serge Garant	Quintette
1981	John Rea	Com-possession
1982	Walter Boudreau	L'Odyssée du Soleil
1983	John Hawkins	Breaking Through
1985	Brian Cherney	River of Fire
1986	Michel Longtin	Pohjatuuli
1987	Denys Bouliane	À propos... et le baron perché
1988	Michael Colgrass	Strangers: Irreconcilable Variations
1989	Peter Paul Koprowski	Sonnet for Laura
1991	Donald Steven	In the Land of Pure Delight
1992	John Rea	Objets perdus
1993	Bruce Mather	YQUEM
1994	Peter Paul Koprowski	Woodwind Quintet
1995	John Burke	String Quartet
1996	Christos Hatzis	Erotikos Logos
1997	Omar Daniel	Zwei Lieder nach Rilke
1998	Michael Oesterle	Reprise
1999	Alexina Louie	Nightfall
2000	André Ristic	Catalogue 1 [bombes occidentales]
2001	Chris Harman	Amerika
2002	Yannick Plamondon	Autoportrait sur Times Square
2003	Éric Morin	D'un Château l'autre
2004	Patrick Saint-Denis	Les dits de Victoire
2005	Linda Catlin Smith	Garland
2006	James Rolfe	raW
2007	Chris Harman	Postludio a rovescio
2008	Analia Llugdar	Que sommes-nous
2009	Jimmie LeBlanc	L’Espace intérieur du monde
2010	Justin Christensen	The Failures of Marsyas
2011	Cassandra Miller	Bel Canto
2012	Zosha Di Castri	Cortège
2013	Nicole Lizée	White Label Experiment
2014	Thierry Tidrow	Au fond du cloître humide
2015	Pierre Alexandre Tremblay	Les pâleurs de la lune
2016	Cassandra Miller	About Bach
2017	Gabriel Dharmoo	Wanmansho
2018	Brian Current	Shout, Sisyphus, Flock
2019	Alec Hall	Vertigo
2020	Kelly-Marie Murphy	Coffee Will be Served in the Living Room
2021	Anthony Tan	Ways of Returning
2022	Rita Ueda	as the first spring blossoms awaken through the snow
2023	Vahram Sargsyan	Quiet Songs
2024	Alice Ping Yee Ho	Femme de Glace

== See also ==
- Félix Award
- Calixa-Lavallée Award
