= Something to Sing About (disambiguation) =

"Something to Sing About" is a Canadian patriotic song by Oscar Brand.

Something to Sing About may also refer to:

- Something to Sing About (1937 film), an American film directed by Victor Schertzinger and starring James Cagney
- Something to Sing About (1947 film), a French musical film directed by Gilles Grangier
- Something to Sing About (2000 film), a television movie starring Darius McCrary
- Something to Sing About (album), a folk-music compilation album including songs by John Denver
- "Something to Sing About" (Buffyverse), a song from the Buffy the Vampire Slayer episode "Once More, with Feeling"
