= Clermont Pépin =

Canadian composer

Clermont Pépin OC OQ (May 15, 1926 – September 2, 2006) was a Canadian pianist, composer and teacher who lived in Quebec.

== Early life and education ==
Jean Joseph Clermont Pépin was born in Saint-Georges, Quebec in 1926. Pépin studied with influential Canadian composers Claude Champagne (Montreal) and Arnold Walter (Toronto), and at the Curtis Institute of Music in Philadelphia from 1941 to 1944 with Rosario Scalero. He composed music for a film in 1948. In 1949 he won the Quebec government study grant Prix d'Europe as a pianist, which afforded him the opportunity to study several years in Paris (1949–1955). During this time he studied composition with Arthur Honegger and André Jolivet, and analysis with Olivier Messiaen at the same time as Pierre Boulez, Karlheinz Stockhausen, and Serge Garant. His work was also part of the music event in the art competition at the 1948 Summer Olympics.

== Career ==
In the 1950s Pépin's compositions were performed by a number of symphony orchestras. He taught at the Conservatoire de musique du Québec à Montréal from 1955 to 1964 and later served as director from 1967 to 1973.

His pupils included François Dompierre, André Gagnon, André Prévost, Jeannine Vanier, Jacques Hétu, Silvio Palmieri and Micheline Coulombe Saint-Marcoux. Pépin was best known for his String Quartets Nos. 3 and 4, his Symphonies Nos. 3 (Quasars), 4 (La messe sur le monde) and 5 (Implosion) and his ballets L'Oiseau-phénix and Le Porte-rêve.

Pépin's work was performed regularly on CBC Radio in the 1980s. He was named to the Order of Canada in 1981.

In 1985, he established the Concours de Musique Clermont-Pépin to encourage the development of artists from the Beauce region of Quebec. In 1990, he was named an officer of the National Order of Quebec.

He died of liver cancer in 2006, aged 80.

== Honors ==
- 1949 - Prix d'Europe
- 1952 - Prix du Centenaire de l'Université Laval
- 1955 - Prix international de composition de Radio-Luxembourg
- 1970 - Prix Calixa-Lavallée
- 1970 - Bene merenti de patria
- 1981 - Officer of the Order of Canada
- 1990 - Officer of the National Order of Quebec
