= Raynald Arseneault =

- Born: 9 June 1945; Quebec City, Quebec, Canada
- Died: 27 January 1995 (aged 49)
- Occupations: Composer, organist
- Instrument: Pipe organ
- Years active: 1973–1995

Raynald Arseneault (9 June 1945 – 27 January 1995) was a Canadian composer and organist. An associate of the Canadian Music Centre, his compositional output consists of more than 50 works. His style was particularly influenced by Ivan Wyschnegradsky and Giacinto Scelsi; both of whom he met with in Europe during the 1970s. He served for many years as the organist and director of sacred music at Saint-Marc Church in Rosemont.

Born in Quebec City, Arseneault studied with Françoise Aubut and Gilles Tremblay at the Conservatoire de musique du Québec à Montréal where he graduated with a premier prix in composition in 1973. That same year he won the Prix d’Europe which enabled him to pursue studies in France. He remained for eight years in that country where he studied composition with Tony Aubin, Claude Lefebvre, Claude Ballif, Ivo Malec and Michel Philippot.

Raynald Arseneault's music has been performed in numerous music festivals around the world, and has been recorded by the RTBF, the ORTF and the CBC. Some of the principal performers of his music are, notably, the Montreal Symphony Orchestra, the Nouvel Orchestre Philharmonique de Radio-France (Edgar Cosma), the Orchestre Métropolitain (Walter Boudreau), the Orchestre symphonique de la Radio-Télévision Belge (Simon Streatfeild), the Société de musique contemporaine du Québec (Gilles Auger); organists Bernard Foccroulle, Michelle Quintal, André Laberge and Gisèle Guibord, singer Natalie Choquette, pianists Louis-Philippe Pelletier, Suzanne Fournier, Daniel Cholette and Julio Laks, violinist Carmen Fournier, guitarist Michael Laucke, and flautists Lise Daoust, Claire Marchand and Helmut W. Erdmann.

He has been awarded several grants from the Ministère de l'Éducation and the Ministère des Affaires culturelles du Québec, as well as from The Canada Council. Arseneault was also a resident at the Cité Internationale des Arts de Paris in the studio of The Canada Council (1979–80) and in the studio of the Ministère des Affaires culturelles du Québec (1980–81).
