= Donald Steven =

- Born: 26 May 1945 (age 81); Montreal, Quebec
- Genres: Classical, Folk
- Years active: 1964–

Donald Steven (born 26 May 1945) is a Canadian-American composer, music educator, and academic administrator. An associate composer of the Canadian Music Centre, he won a BMI Student Composer Award in 1970, the Canadian Federation of University Women's Golden Jubilee Creative Arts Award in 1972, the 1987 Juno Award for Classical Composition of the Year (for Pages of Solitary Delights) and the 1991 Jules Léger Prize for New Chamber Music (for In the Land of Pure Delight). His musical compositions are characterized by their emphasis on instrumental colour and atmosphere. Perhaps his most well known piece is his Illusions for solo cello, which has been widely performed in concert and on television and radio broadcasts.

== Life and career ==
Born in Montreal, he attended Selwyn House School, followed by Ashbury College. He began his career performing and arranging folk and rock music in the 1960s (most notably with The Raftsmen) before pursuing professional studies in music. In 1968 he entered McGill University where he was a music composition student of Bruce Mather. After graduating from McGill with a Bachelor of Music in 1972, he entered the graduate music program at Princeton University where he studied under Milton Babbitt, earning a Master of Fine Arts in 1974. He later earned a Doctor of Philosophy from Princeton.

In 1975, Steven joined the Faculty of Music (now the Schulich School of Music) at McGill University, ultimately becoming the head of the performance department in 1986. He taught music composition at the school until 1992 and was involved in the modernization of McGill's studio for electronic music and the creation of the computer music studios. In 1992, he became dean of the Conservatory of Music at Purchase College and, subsequently in 1997, founding dean of the College of the Performing Arts at Roosevelt University. He has since worked in senior administration at the State University of New York and The Citadel, and retired as Provost and Vice President for Academic Affairs at Rider University in 2013. He is also a former faculty member of the University of Western Ontario.

Steven's works have been performed throughout the world, including the World Music Days of the International Society for Contemporary Music and the World Cello Congress. He has received numerous commissions, including from Maureen Forrester, Tsuyoshi Tsutsumi, Bertram Turetzky, Robert Riseling, and Alvaro Pierri, and from La Société de musique contemporaine du Québec, Répercussion, the Pierrot Ensemble, the Canadian Electronic Ensemble, New Music Concerts and the Canadian Broadcasting Corporation.

== Selected works ==
- Harbinger, a fantasia for soprano and orchestra, 1969 (BMI Award for Student Composers), 1969
- Illusions, an elegy for solo cello, 1971
- The Gossamer Cathedral, five surrealistic frescoes for chamber ensemble, 1972
- Crossroads, for chamber ensemble, 1974
- The Transient, for soprano and chamber ensemble, 1975
- Images: Refractions of Time and Space, for flute, electric piano, electric bass and percussion, 1977
- For Madmen Only, magic theatre for solo cello and orchestra, 1978
- Rainy Day Afternoon, for brass quintet, 1979
- Night Suite, for chamber ensemble, 1979
- Wired, electronic ensemble and optional tape, 1981
- On the Down Side, for jazz septet, 1982
- Bert in Nether-Nether Land, adventures for solo contrabass and ensemble, 1983
- Ordre sans ordre (sans désordre), concerto for solo guitar and chamber orchestra, 1984
- Straight on Till Morning, for chamber ensemble and tape, 1985
- Pages of Solitary Delights, for contralto and orchestra, 1985 (Juno Award 1987)
- Sapphire Song, for solo clarinet, 1986
- Love Where the Nights are Long, for soprano, oboe d'amore and orchestra, 1987
- Full Valleys, for children's choir, 1989
- Orbits, for four percussionists and tape, 1989
- That Other Shore, for solo contrabass and low strings, 1990
- In the Land of Pure Delight, for chamber ensemble, 1991 (Jules Léger Prize 1991)
- ô, to make dreames true, miniatures for the Harry Partch Instrumentarium, 2001
- mesmerie0000-mesmerie0100, five computer-generated etudes, 2008
- GearTrain, computer-generated isorhythmic motet, 2008
- ScatterToms, computer-generated electronic music, 2013
- Evensong, computer-generated electronic music, 2015
- Generations, computer-generated electronic and ambient music, 2015
- Au Bord des Flots, Scènes Acadiennes d'autrefois pour trois jeunes ami(e)s de la clarinette, 2015
- Anamnesis, for two shakuhachi, 2016
- souvenirs d'autrefois, three bagatelles for clarinet and bassoon, 2016
- October, for solo alto flute, 2017
- Dusk, for shakuhachi and chamber ensemble, 2020
- Aphorismes, for solo clarinet, 2023
