= John Hawkins (Canadian composer) =

Canadian composer, conductor, music educator and pianist

John Hawkins (26 July 1944 in Montreal – 14 January 2007 in Toronto) was a Canadian composer, conductor, music educator, and pianist. He notably won the 2nd-century Week Composition Competition in 1967 for his Eight Movements for Flute and Clarinet and received the Jules Léger Prize in 1983 for Breaking Through which was commissioned by Arraymusic. In 1971, he helped found the New Music Concerts in Toronto and was frequent performer there during his lifetime. He also frequently performed in concerts presented by the Société de musique contemporaine du Québec, notably appearing as a soloist on the organization's recording of Jacques Hétu's Cycle.

Hawkins began his professional education at the Conservatoire de musique du Québec à Québec where he was a pupil of Lubka Kolessa. He transferred to McGill University in 1965 where he went on to earn a Bachelor of Music (1967), a Concert Diploma (1968), and a Master of Music (1970). At McGill he studied music composition with István Anhalt through a grant from the Woodrow Wilson National Fellowship Foundation. He also studying conducting with Pierre Boulez in Basel in 1969.

In 1970, Hawkins became a member of the faculty of the University of Toronto, where he taught music theory, analysis, composition, and orchestration until ill health forced him to retire in 2006. He died a year later at the age of 62. Among his notable pupils was composer John Burge. He was an associate of the Canadian Music Centre and a member of the Canadian League of Composers.
