= Guy Reibel =

French composer

Guy Reibel (born 27 October 1936 in Strasbourg, France) is a French contemporary classical music composer.

Reibel made his musical studies at the Conservatoire de Paris and trained under Olivier Messiaen and Serge Nigg. He is a pioneer of the Groupe de Recherches Musicales with Pierre Schaeffer, François Bayle, Luc Ferrari, François-Bernard Mâche, Iannis Xenakis, Bernard Parmegiani, Marcelle Deschênes. He has also collaborated with French public broadcasting stations like France Musique and France Culture. He is cited as the conceptualizer of the digital musical instrument Omni (1985).

== Discography ==
- 1967 Solfège de l'objet sonore with Pierre Schaeffer
- 1969 À mille et une voix
- 1983 Langages imaginaires
- 1983 Suite pour Edgar Poe
- 1994 Granulations–sillages...
- 2000 Chœurs imaginaires
- 2006 Le Jeu vocal

== List of works ==
- Chants sauvages pour piano et Omni
