= Jacques Desjardins =

Canadian composer

Jacques Desjardins is a Canadian composer and conductor whose music has been performed by important ensembles internationally like the Toronto Symphony Orchestra and the Ijsbreker Ensemble.

He has won first prize at the Society of Composers, Authors and Music Publishers of Canada composition competition twice and was chosen to represent Canada at the first International Forum of New Music that was organized by the Nouvel Ensemble Moderne. He was awarded several grants from the Canada Council and has been commissioned to write works for the Arthur-LeBlanc String Quartet, the Ensemble Contemporain de Montréal, the Musica Nova Ensemble, and the Sherbrooke Symphony Orchestra.

Desjardins studied music composition with Bruce Mather at McGill University where he earned a Bachelor of Music and a Master of Music, and obtained a Doctorate of Musical Arts from the University of Michigan. He taught on the music faculty of the Université de Sherbrooke from 1993 to 2002 and is currently a member of the music faculty at the San Francisco Conservatory of Music.
