= Peter Paul Koprowski =

Canadian composer, conductor, music educator and pianist

- Born: 24 August 1947 (age 78); Łódź
- Education: Academy of Music in Łódź; Academy of Music in Kraków; University of Toronto
- Occupations: composer, conductor, music educator, and pianist

Peter Paul Koprowski (born 24 August 1947, in Łódź) is a Canadian composer, conductor, music educator, and pianist of Polish descent. He became a Canadian citizen in 1976. As a composer he is chiefly known for his large output of symphonic works which began with his still frequently performed In Memoriam Karol Szymanowski (1963). He has twice won the Jules Léger Prize (in 1989 for Sonnet for Laura and in 1994 for his Woodwind Quintet) and received the Canada Council's Victor M. Lynch-Staunton Award in 1989. His first Viola Concerto was awarded the Jean A. Chalmers National Music Award in 1997. He was nominated for a Juno Award in 2002 for Redemption, a concerto for viola and orchestra.

Koprowski began his musical training at the Academy of Music in Łódź, earning an Artist Diploma in 1966. He earned a master's degree from the Academy of Music in Kraków in 1969 where he was a pupil of Bolesław Woytowicz. He then studied in Paris with Nadia Boulanger from 1969 to 1971. He earned a Doctor of Music from the University of Toronto in 1977 where he was a pupil of John Weinzweig.
