= Dan School of Drama and Music =

Unit of Queen's University in Kingston, Canada

- Former names: Department of Drama; School of Music
- Type: Drama school Music school
- Established: 2015
- Parent institution: Faculty of Arts and Sciences
- Affiliations: Queen's University at Kingston
- Director: Julia Brook
- Location: Kingston, Ontario, Canada
- Website: https://sdm.queensu.ca/

The Dan School of Drama and Music is part of the Faculty of Arts and Sciences at Queen's University at Kingston, in Kingston, Ontario, Canada.

In 2015, Queen's University's School of Music merged with its Drama department to become the School of Music and Drama. The next year, the school received a $5-million donation from Canadian businessman and philanthropist Aubrey Dan and was renamed the Dan School of Drama and Music.

The current director of the School is Julia Brook, who succeeded Craig Walker in 2022. Past directors of the School of Music have included John Burge, István Anhalt, Ireneus Zuk, Alfred Fisher, Gordon E. Smith, and Margaret Walker.

== School of Music ==
The School of Music is housed on the main campus of the University within Harrison-LeCaine Hall on Bader Lane, named after Frank Ll. Harrison, the first professor of music at Queen's, and Hugh Le Caine, composer and electronic instrument builder.

Founded in 1969 as the Department of Music, students at the School can enroll in the Bachelor of Music (B. Mus) program, Bachelor of Arts (Music) program, or the Concurrent Education (Music) program.

In 2025, budget cuts reduced the level of applied music instruction in the Bachelor of Music program.
