= Yves Daoust =

Canadian composer (born 1946)

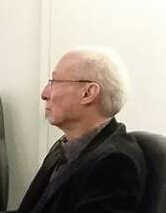

Background information
- Born: 10 April 1946 (age 79); Longueuil, Quebec, Canada
- Origin: Montréal, Quebec, Canada
- Genres: Electroacoustic music
- Occupation: Composer
- Instrument: Piano
- Years active: 1978–present
- Labels: empreintes DIGITALes, Analekta

Yves Daoust (born 10 April 1946) is a Canadian composer who is particularly known for his works of electroacoustic music. He currently resides in Montréal.

== Life ==
Born in Longueuil, Quebec, Daoust began his musical studies at the age of seven, studying piano with Alice Vigeant. At sixteen, he produced his first experiments in electroacoustic music when he "prepared" the family piano in order to create the soundtrack for a friend's 8mm experimental film. At nineteen, Daoust completed his first electronic work: an hour of music for a gestural theater work premiered in Berlin (Germany) as part of an international amateur theater festival. At twenty he entered the Conservatoire de musique et d'art dramatique du Québec in Montréal, initially in the piano class of Irving Heller and subsequently in the composition class of Gilles Tremblay.

After meeting Maurice Blackburn, Daoust entered a training program in film music techniques at the National Film Board of Canada (NFB) in Montreal. This was followed by an apprenticeship at the Institut international de musique électroacoustique de Bourges, IMEB, from 1974 to 1976. In 1976, he returned to the NFB as a sound designer for three years in the Sound workshop.

Together with Marcelle Deschênes, Michel Longtin, Philippe Ménard, Jean Sauvageau, and Pierre Trochu, Daoust founded ACREQ, the Association pour la création et la recherche électroacoustiques du Québec, which he later directed for a period of ten years.

In 1981 he was appointed professor at the Conservatoire de musique et d'art dramatique du Québec, where he was mandated to develop programs in electroacoustics for both the Conservatoire de musique du Québec à Montréal|Montréal branch and the Québec branch.

Since Daoust's official entry into the professional world of music in 1978, he has composed an average of one work per year, in various genres, for diverse occasions, and ensembles. His influences are many and varied: film scores, John Cage, Iannis Xenakis, Mauricio Kagel, Luc Ferrari, Alain Savouret, Karlheinz Stockhausen (Hymnen), Ludwig van Beethoven, Robert Schumann, and René Magritte.

He has three children, born in 1978, 1992 and 1998.

== Recordings ==
- Bruits (empreintes DIGITALes, IMED 0156, 2001)
- Musiques naïves (empreintes DIGITALes, IMED 9843, 1998)
- Filmusique-Filmopéra with Maurice Blackburn (Analekta, AN 7005/06, 1996)
- Anecdotes (empreintes DIGITALes, IMED 9106, 1991)

== List of works ==
- About Time (2005)
- Adagio (1986), flute, and tape
- Bruits (1997–2001)
- L'Entrevue (1991), accordion, and tape
- Fantaisie (1986)
- La gamme (1981, 2000)
- Il était une fois (conte sans paroles) (1986)
- Impromptu (1994)
- Impromptu [mixte] (1995), piano, synthesizer / sampler, and tape
- Joie (1992)
- Maurice Blackburn, ou portrait d'un méconnu (1982–95)
- Mi bémol (1990)
- Objets trouvés (2002)
- Ouverture (1989)
- Petite musique sentimentale (1984), piano, and tape
- Quatuor (1979)
- Résonances (1992)
- Solo (2003)
- Suite Baroque (1989)
- Le temps fixé (2004)
- Valse (1981), flute (and piccolo), Bb and Eb clarinets, alto, tenor and baritone saxophones, trumpet, electronic organ, amplified harpsichord, piano, electronic piano, violin, and tape
- Variations sur un air d'accordéon (1988), comedian-accordionist, and tape
- Water Music (1991)
