= Benoît Lacroix =

Quebec theologian, philosopher, Dominican priest, professor and historian

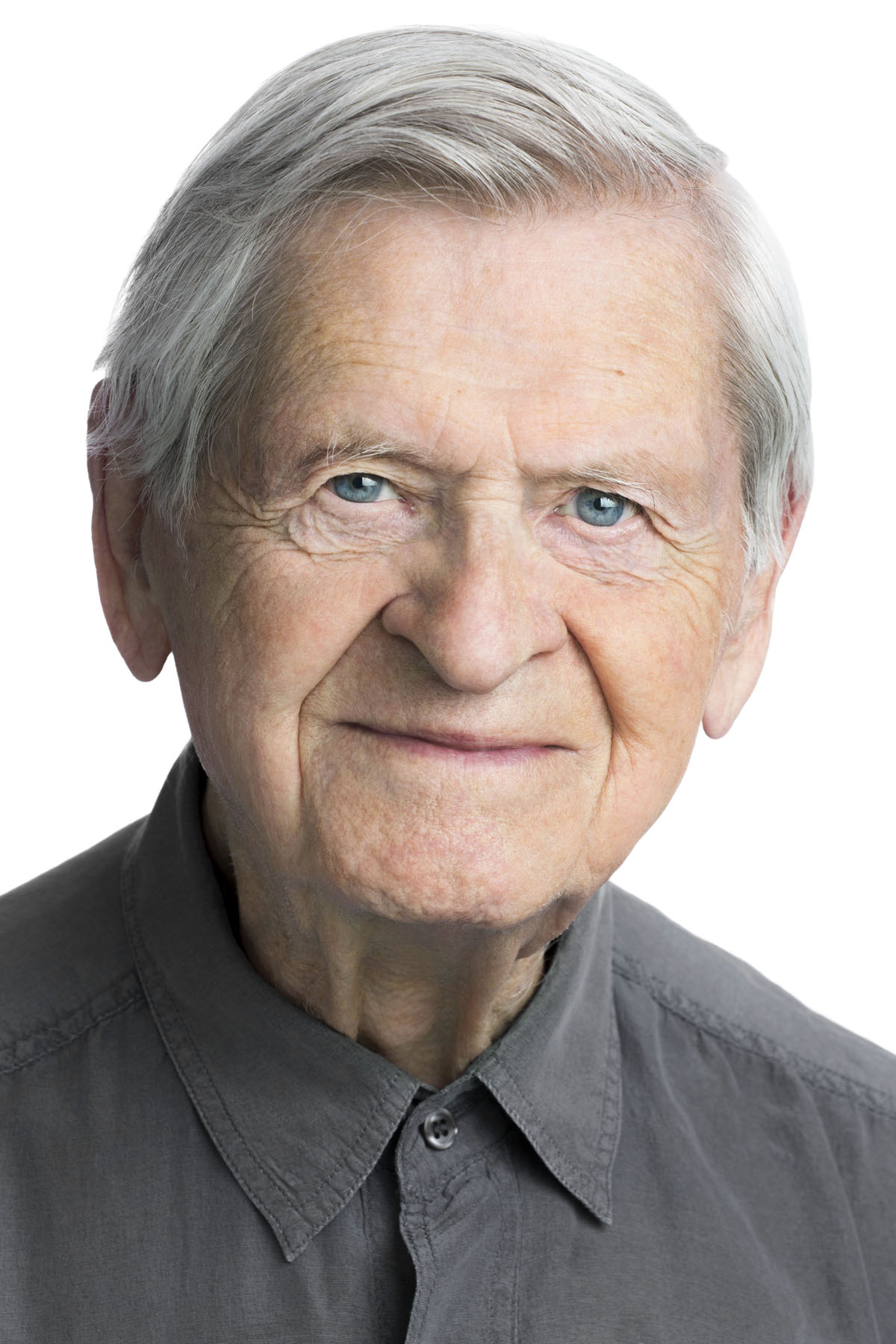
- Benoît Lacroix in 2012
- Born: Joachim Lacroix; 8 September 1915; Saint-Michel-de-Bellechasse, Quebec, Canada
- Died: 2 March 2016 (aged 100); Montréal, Quebec
- Occupation(s): Theologian; Philosopher; Professor; Priest

Benoît Lacroix OP OC GOQ MSRC (French pronunciation: [bənwa lakʁwa]; 8 September 1915 – 2 March 2016) was a Quebec theologian, philosopher, Dominican priest, professor in medieval studies and historian of the Medieval period, and author of almost 50 works and a great number of articles.

== Biography ==
=== Early life ===
He was born Joachim Lacroix in Saint-Michel-de-Bellechasse, Quebec, one of five children to Caïus Lacroix and Rose-Anna Blais. He studied at Collège de Sainte-Anne-de-la-Pocatière obtaining a baccalaureate in the arts in 1936. The same year, he entered the Dominican school in Saint-Hyacinthe to study religion. He was ordained a priest with the Dominican Order on 5 July 1941, obtaining a degree in theology from the Dominican University College in Ottawa in 1941. According to Pietro Boglioni, a historian who wrote a comprehensive biography of Lacroix, he was named Benoît after becoming a Dominican priest, in memory of Pope Benedict XI (in French, Benoît XI), a Dominican pope from the Middle Ages. After entering the Dominican Order, Father Benoît Lacroix wanted to travel in a mission to Europe to specialize in liturgical studies. But World War II halted his ambitions and instead he studied for a Ph.D. in Mediaeval Sciences from the Pontifical Institute of Mediaeval Studies in Toronto in 1951, under the guidance of philosopher, historian professor Étienne Gilson, who encouraged him to study Historiography. His thesis was titled "Les Débuts de l'historiographie chrétienne" (The Beginnings of Christian Historiography") followed by "L'Histoire dans l'antiquité" (History in Antiquity) in 1951 with a preface by historian philosopher and Early Christianity expert professor Henri-Irénée Marrou. He completed his post-doctoral studies at École pratique des hautes études, and at École Nationale des Chartes both in Paris in 1952-1953 and at Harvard University in Cambridge, Massachusetts in 1959-1960, with a bursary from the Guggenheim Fellowship.

=== Career ===
Between 1945 and 1985, he lectured at various periods at the Institute of Medieval Studies at Université de Montréal, and was appointed director of the Institute between 1963 and 1969. He was also an invited professor and lecturer at universities in Kyoto University in Japan in 1961, the National University of Rwanda in Butare, Rwanda in 1965–1966 and at the Chair of Quebec Civilisation at University of Caen Normandy, in Caen France (1973–1976).

According to historian Guy Laperrière, Benoît Lacroix's initial literary beginning were his writings about literature, art and history particularly in La Revue Dominicaine. Starting in 1962, he was collaborating with Father Henri-Marie Bradet, the founder of the publication who also founded Maintenant, another important intellectual publication. Lacroix succeeded Bradet at La Revue Dominicaine in 1985 after Bradet was stripped of his duties as editor in chief during the turbulent times of the Quiet Revolution (Révolution tranquille in French) on what became known as the "Bradet Affair" which was interpreted as a "freedom of expression" issue and his departure a result of a scheme to silence him by the Quebec provincial superior of the Dominican Order Father Thomas-M. Rondeau after having received stern warnings about Bradet from his Dominican superiors in Rome. Lacroix shaken by the affair wrote the preface to a biographical book by Denyse Boucher St-Pierre in 1973 in memory of Father Bradet.

In 1968, Lacroix founded the Centre d'études des religions populaires (Centre of Studies of Popular Religions). Between 1968 and 1971, the Centre published 12 papers, Cahiers d'études des religions populaires and organized between 1970 and 1982, 11 academic conferences about popular religion in French-speaking Catholics in Quebec, Ontario and Acadie.

In collaboration with Jacques Brault, Lacroix published a critical edition on the works of the Quebec poet and writer Hector de Saint-Denys Garneau under the title Œuvres de Saint-Denys Garneau in 1971.

From 1973 to 1976, Lacroix was director of chair of Quebec Studies at University of Caen Normandy in France, greatly encouraging the cultural and academic exchange between France and Quebec, particularly in education. Hundreds of professors and students benefited from the exchanges. After leaving the chair, the position was taken by sociologist Jean-Charles Falardeau.

In the mid-1980s, he left the academic life at the university, to work more freely as author, presenter, communicator and thinker, gaining wide fame in religious and intellectual circles in Quebec according to professor and historian Pietro Boglioni.

In 1979 he was a founding member of Institut québécois de recherche (IQRC, Quebec Research Institute). headed by sociologist Fernand Dumont under the ministerial jurisdiction of Camille Laurin, Minister of State for Cultural and Scientific Development in Quebec at the time, from 1980 to 1986, was a member of the Science Committee of the Institute, heading notably in 1980 the IQRC sub-group specializing in popular religions that was made of Lacroix, Lucille Côté, Hélène Dionne, Michèle Trudel-Drouin, Danielle Nepveu and Louise Rondeau, including organizing of an international academic conference in 1982 on studies of popular religions in close collaboration with Jean-Paul Montminy, another father from the Dominican Order, assisted by Fernand Dumont, Pierre Savard et Jean Simard. With Simard, Benoît Lacroix published Religion populaire, religion de clercs? (Popular religion, the religion of the clergy?) in 1984 followed by another co-authorship with Madeleine Grammond in 1985 titled Religion populaire au Québec. Typologie des sources: Bibliographie sélective (1900-1980). A Spanish translation of his work was published by Universidad Católica Santa María La Antigua in Panama City under the title Tipologia en la religiosidad popular en Canada.

He also published popular works like La religion de mon père (The Religion of My Father) in 1986 and La foi de ma mère (The Faith of My Mother) in 2001. He also took part in a number of radio and television shows about the popular religion.

Between 1987 and 2010, Benoît Lacroix wrote and published a number of essays with a spiritual and poetic tendency in Montreal French-language daily Le Devoir. In 2012, Quebec journalist Josée Blanchette published a long documentary about Father Benoît Lacroix and the Convent of Saint-Albert-le-Grand of the Dominicans, on chemin de la Côte-Sainte-Catherine à Montréal, under the title Bonté divine: 24 heures au couvent des dominicains.

He was a friend and greatly respected by academicians as well as intellectuals and personalities from all walks of life including professor Étienne Gilson, French philosopher Jacques Maritain, Canadian Prime Minister Pierre Elliott Trudeau, Mgr. Félix-Antoine Savard, Father Georges-Henri Lévesque, Abbé Pierre, sociologist, philosopher, theologian and poet Fernand Dumont and poet and singer-songwriter Gilles Vigneault and writers Robert Élie, Jean Le Moyne and Jacques Brault.

In 2012, Lacroix celebrated 75 years of priesthood and religious life. Lacroix became a centenarian, in September 2015, and died of pneumonia on 2 March 2016.

== Awards and honours ==
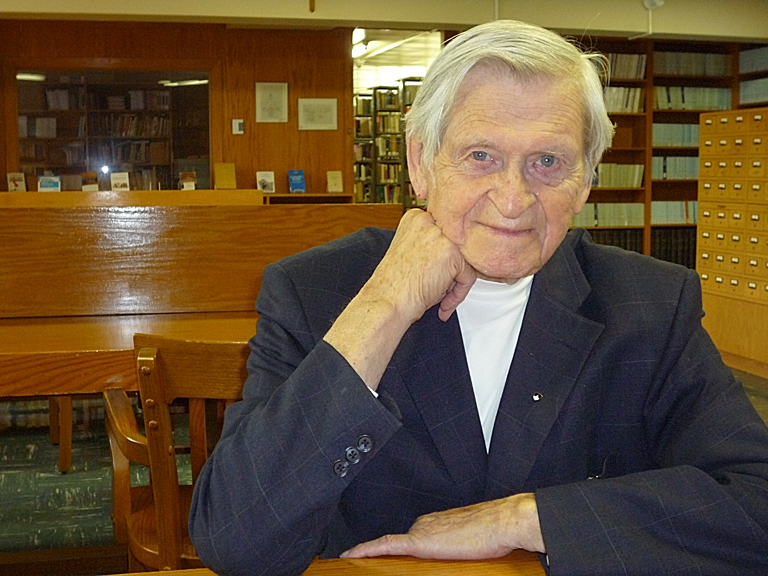
Father Benoît Lacroix in the library of Couvent Saint-Albert-le-Grand of the Dominicans in Montréal (13 August 2014)

In 1971, he became a member of the Royal Society of Canada and a member of the French Académie des Sciences Morales et Politiques.

In 1981, he was awarded the prestigious Prix Léon-Gérin, an award established by the Government of Quebec as part of the Prix du Québec, which "goes to researchers in one of the social sciences". The prize committee sited his works as a theologian, a specialist in popular religions, writer, literary historian and Dominican father, quoting sociologist, theologian, priest and writer Jacques Grand'Maison that Lacoix was one of the best witnesses of Quebec's history from medieval times and as a historian, in the intellectual tradition that fascilated western thinking. His works also permitted a better understanding of Quebec history in new eyes, adding that since the 1950s and the very first of his publications with Pourquoi aimer le Moyen Âge (Why Love the Middle Ages), he showed his expertise in medieval studies and in popular religions.

In 1982, he became a member of Société des Dix, a group of Quebec historians and in 1985, became an Officer of Order of Canada (O.C.). In 1097, he received the Pierre Chauveau Medal awarded by the Royal Society of Canada "for a distinguished contribution to knowledge in the humanities other than Canadian literature and Canadian history" and in 1990, received an honorary Doctorat honoris causa from Université de Sherbrooke. He became a Knight of National Order of Quebec and 5 years later Grand Officer of the same Quebec order.

The public library in Saint-Michel-de-Bellechasse, the hometown of Benoît Lacroix was renamed "Bibliothèque Benoît-Lacroix" in his honour.

Canadian composer Nicole Rodrigue (1943-2010) used Lacroix’s text in her composition Hommage a Fernando.

== Bibliography ==
Publications

- L'historien au Moyen Âge, Paris, Librairie J. Vrin; Montréal: Institut d'études médiévales, 1971, 301 p.
- Orose et ses idées, Paris, Librairie J. Vrin; Montréal: Institut d'études médiévales, 1965, 235 p.
- Pourquoi aimer le Moyen Âge?, Montréal, L'Œuvre des tracts, 367, 1950, 15 p.
- Les débuts de l'historiographie médiévale, doctoral thesis (in Mediaeval Sciences), Pontifical Institute of Mediaeval Studies, Toronto, 1951, 274 typewriter pages. Prix de la Province de Québec, 1952
- Les débuts de l'historiographie chrétienne: ses origines, son esprit, ses méthodes, Pontifical Institute of Mediaeval Studies, Toronto, 1950, 274 p.
- L'histoire dans l'Antiquité, preface by Henri-Irénée Marrou, Paris, Librairie J. Vrin; Montréal: Institut d'études médiévales, 1951, 252 p.
- Lionel Groulx, coll. Classiques canadiens, Montréal & Paris, Fides, 1967. 96 p.

Publications on popular religions

- Les religions populaires, Colloque 1970, (1972) Benoît Lacroix & Pietro Boglioni, 154 p.
- Les pèlerinages au Québec, Pietro Boglioni & Benoit Lacroix, Les Presse de l'Université Laval, Quebec, 1981, 160 p.
- La Religion de mon père, Benoît Lacroix, Bellarmin, Montreal (1986), 306 p.
- La Foi de ma mère, Benoît Lacroix, Bellarmin, Montreal (1999), 558 p.
- Religion populaire au Québec. Typologie des sources: bibliographie sélective (1900-1980), Benoit Lacroix & Madeleine Grammont, Preface by Jean Simard, Éditions de l'Institut québécois de recherche sur la culture (IQRC) (1985), 175 p.
- Fonds Jean Simard, Benoit Lacroix & Jean Simard, Éditions de l'Institut québécois de recherche sur la culture (IQRC) (1984), 444 p.

Publications on spirituality

- Sainte Thérèse de Lisieux et l'histoire de son âme, Michel de Ladurantaye, a pen name of Benoît Lacroix, éd du Lévrier, Montreal and Ottawa, 1947, 155 p.
- Compagnon de Dieu, éd. du Lévrier, Montreal, 1961, 365 p.
- Le Rwanda: mille heures au pays des mille collines, éd. du Lévrier, Montreal, 1966, 96 p.
- Folklore de la mer et religion, coll. Connaissance, Leméac, Montreal, 1980, 119 p.
- Célébration des saisons, coedition Anne Sigier et Centre Alpec, Quebec, 1981, 140 p.
- Silence, with illustrations by Chantal Lévesque, éd. du Silence, Montreal, 1989
- Paroles à des religieuses, Fides, Montreal, 1985, 254 p.
- Musée des religions de Nicolet, in collaboration with Michel Lessard, Catherine Elbaz, Anne MacLaren & Jean Sunard, Montreal, 1986, 431 p.
- Nous sommes un peuple en marche: carnet d'Avent 1986 Vie liturgique, Quebec, 1986, 64 p.
- Dieu fait les premiers pas: carnet du Carême 1991, Vie liturgique, Quebec, 1988, 64 p.
- Dieu qui nous appelle à vivre: carnet du Carême 1988, Vie liturgique, 1988, 64 p.
- Jeunes et croyants, éd. Paulines et Médiaspaul, Montreal, 1991, 93 p.
- Célébration des âges et des saisons, éd. Anne Sigier, Quebec, 1993, 149 p.
- Amour, éd. du Silence, Montreal, 1995
