= Marie-Thérèse Paquin =

Concert pianist and piano professor

Marie-Thérèse Paquin CM CQ
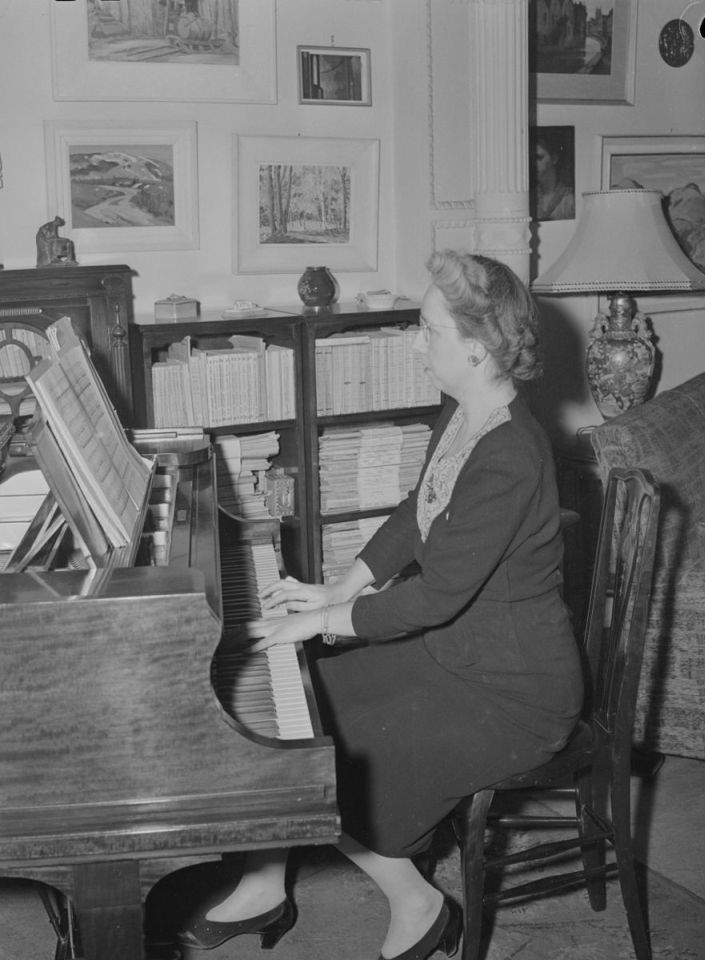
- Marie-Thérèse Paquin playing piano in Montréal, January 1945
- Born: July 4, 1905; Montreal, Quebec, Canada
- Died: May 9, 1997 (aged 91); Montreal, Quebec, Canada
- Other name: Marie-Thérèse Vintrin-Paquin
- Education: Université de Montréal
- Occupations: Concert pianist; Music professor; Translator
- Organizations: Montreal Symphony Orchestra; Conservatoire de musique du Québec à Montréal; Banff Centre School of Fine Arts
- Known for: Pianist for the Montreal Symphony Orchestra (1936–1964); Word-for-word operatic libretto translations
- Awards: Prix Calixa-Lavallée (1982); Chevalier de l'Ordre national du Québec (1987); Member of the Order of Canada (1980)

Marie-Thérèse Paquin, CM CQ was born July 4, 1905, in Montreal, Quebec, and died in the same city on May 9, 1997. She was a concert pianist and piano professor.

== Biography ==
Paquin studied piano with Alfred La Liberté. She had a brilliant career as a member of a quartet for 20 years. She was pianist for the Montreal Symphony Orchestra from 1936 to 1964. She played under the direction of many great names such as Pierre Monteux, Charles Münch, Igor Stravinski, Wilfrid Pelletier, J.J. Gagnier, Jean-Marie Beaudet and Jean Deslauriers.

== Honneurs ==
- 1980 - Member of the Order of Canada
- 1982 - Prix Calixa-Lavallée
- 1987 - Chevalier de l'Ordre national du Québec

== Sources ==
- Leclerc, Gilles M.; Rochon, Pierre (December 16, 2013) [2007]. "Marie-Thérèse Paquin". The Canadian Encyclopedia (online ed.). Historica Canada.
- Marie-Thérèse Paquin, C.M., Membre (1980) de l'Order of Canada
- Marie-Thérèse Vintrin-Paquin (1905 – 1997), Chevalière (1987) de l'Ordre national du Québec
