= Theatre Gargantua =

Canadian Theatre Company

- Formation: 1992
- Type: Theatre group
- Location: Toronto, Ontario, Canada
- Artistic director: Jacquie P.A. Thomas
- Website: theatregargantua.ca

Theatre Gargantua is a Toronto-based theatre company founded by Artistic Director Jacquie P.A. Thomas in 1992. The company emphasizes artist collaboration, both within Canada and globally, combining a range of artistic disciplines to create new work. The defining experimental style of Theatre Gargantua's productions are a hybrid of Thomas' studies in Europe, which include creation as an artistic collective, an extended development phase, imagistic production elements, original composition often performed live and choreographed physicality of performers. The topics of exploration in Gargantua's past shows have been grounded in social issues, creating compelling work that is presented through highly physical performances.

== The company ==
The company consists of a permanent artistic and associate artistic director along with core members and associate artists who work regularly with the company on a project basis. Production staff are hired on a project-by-project basis or as needed.

The company works as a collective to generate each project through exploration and discovery of social issues relevant to our society. Starting with an idea or social issue, artists are asked to research or create work using the idea as inspiration. From there, the idea begins to seed and grow into characters and plot. Production elements are designed to invoke metaphoric meaning and experiment with various visual and physical components.

=== Core artistic members ===
- Jacquie Thomas – founder and artistic director
- Michael Spence – associate artistic director

== Technique and style ==
The Theatre Gargantua style of performance is as much physical as textual, with productions being built by the company from the ground up over a period of years. The technique is quite different than presenting a traditional script. Theatre Gargantua's productions blend live music, acrobatics and imagery. Their performance style has been compared to Montreal's avant-garde. The company's theatre works are diverse in terms of subject, writing and performance styles, but are connected in how each work melds daring physicality with striking designs, underpinned by original live music and the innovative use of technology. The company's production of e-DENTITY, could be categorized as a form of mediatized theatre, and was described as "a world where live and mediatized bodies perform together."

=== Main Cycle ===
Theatre Gargantua's productions are developed over a two-year cycle consisting of the creation, development and performance of work. New projects are developed over the annual spring and summer season of first year, with fully produced public performances of the work in development in the fall. In the second year of a cycle, the work is re-examined and explored throughout the spring and summer seasons sometimes resulting in a radically different production, which receives its premiere in the fall of the second year. The remounting of shows from completed cycles may occur for tours or festivals.

=== Sidestream ===
Theatre Gargantua's Sidestream Cycles are developed by core and associate artists, designed with touring in mind. The first SideStream Cycle, Shrapnel, was created by core member Joel Benson in 2013. Recent Sidestream projects include Teiya Kasahara's The Queen In Me, Beryl Bain's The Flight, and Holly Treddenick's In The Fire.

== Current season ==
=== Dissonant Species and Sidestream Festival ===
Dissonant Species premieres in November 2025 at Factory Theatre in Toronto. In the summer of 2025, Gargantua held their second Sidestream Festival in Chatham, Ontario, through which they featured work-in-development by artists including: Teiya Kasahara, Breton Lalama, Alexandra Lainfiesta, Marikje Reinink, Nabil Traboulsi, and Heather Marie Annis.

== Past productions ==
=== Mainstage productions ===
Dissonant Species (2024–2025)

- Written by Heather Marie Annis and Michael Spence, directed by Jacquie P.A. Thomas

Waterfall (2022–2023)

- Written by Heather Marie Annis and Michael Spence with the ensemble, directed by Jacquie P.A. Thomas

A Tonic for Desperate Times (2022–2021)

- Seven Dora Mavor Moore Award nominations; 3 wins.

The Wager (2018–2019)

- Written by Michael Spence, directed by Jacquie P.A. Thomas

Reflector (2016–2017)

- Written by Michael Spence, directed by Jacquie P.A. Thomas

Avaricious (2014–2015)

- Written by Michael Spence and the ensemble (contributions by Kat Sandler), directed by Jacquie P.A. Thomas

The Sacrifice Zone (2012–2013)

- Written by Suzie Miller, directed by Jacquie P.A. Thomas
- Winner of 2014 Dora Mavor Moore Award in Outstanding Sound Design/Composition

Imprints (2010–2011)

- Written by Michael Spence, directed by Jaquie P.A. Thomas
- Premiered at the Factory Theatre in Toronto

fIBBER (2007–2008)

- Written by Michael Spence, directed by Jacquie P.A. Thomas
- Premiered at The Theatre Centre in Toronto

e-DENTITY (2005–2006)

- Written by Michael Spence, directed by Jacquie P.A. Thomas
- Remounted as part of Mirvish Productions 2007 season

(nod) (2003–2004)

- Written by Rick Roberts, directed by Jacquie P.A. Thomas
- Premiered at Factory Theatre in 2003

Phantom Limb (2001–2002)

- Co-production with Welsh company 20:21 Performance
- Written by Spencer Hazel with text from Jane Siberry & Michael Timmins, directed by Jacquie P.A. Thomas
- Premiered at the Royal Exchange Theatre in Manchester, England
- Made its Canadian debut in spring 2002

The Exit Room (1999–2000)

- Written by Michael Spence, directed by Jacquie P.A. Thomas

Love not Love (1997–1998)

- Written by Michael Spence, conceived and directed by Jacquie P.A. Thomas
- Toured to Montreal in December 1998

Raging Dreams – Into the Visceral (1995–1996)

- Written by Meryn Cadell and Jacquie P.A. Thomas, conceived and directed by Jacquie P.A. Thomas
- Premiered as part of Theatre Passe Muraille season in 1996
- Performed at the Theatre la Chapelle in Montreal in 1998
- Headlined the Portland Oregon Performing Arts Festival in 2000
- Remounted in winter 2008
- Remounted in spring 2017 at the Harbourfront Centre

The Trials: Fortune's Desire (1992–1994)

- Directed by Jacquie P.A. Thomas
- Performed in historic St. Stephens in the Fields Church, Toronto

=== SideStream productions ===
The Flight (2023)

- Created and performed by Beryl Bain
- Co-produced with b current Productions and Roseneath Theatre

The Queen In Me (2022)

- Created and performed by Teiya Kasahara 笠原貞野
- Co-produced with Amplified Opera, the Canadian Opera Company, and Nightwood Theatre

Sleeping, Tucked in the Lonely Purple (2022)

- Created and choreographed by Yvonne Ng
- Co-produced with Tiger Princess Dance

Flora & Fauna (2022)

- Conceived and performed by Holly Treddenick, Lindsay Goodtimes & Monica Dottor
- Co-produced with Femmes du Feu

In The Fire (2022)

- Conceived and performed by Holly Tressider, inspired by her father's experiences as a firefighter
- Co-produced with Femmes du Feu

The Lost Ones (2017)

- Conceived and performed by Pam Patel and Jason White
- Presented at the SummerWorks Lab and MT Space's Impact Festival

Leaving Still (2016)

- Conceived and performed by Michelle Polok as part of 401 Richmond's Built For Art: A Secret Garden series for Nuite Blanche 2016
- Co-produced with The Sephine Collective

The Hum (2015)

- Created by Jenny Aplin, Julia Aplin, John Gzpwski, Michael Spence, and Jacquie P.A. Thomas
- Co-produced with the GZAP Collective

Trace (2014)

- Conceived and directed by Bruce Barton with Vertical City Performance
- Presented by the 2014 SummerWorks Performance Festival in Toronto

Shrapnel (2013)

- Written by Joel Benson, directed by Michael Spence

== Education offered ==
The company offers an annual Master Class in Dynamic Creation for professional artists, and artistic and management internships for emerging artists.

Student programs include physical theatre workshops which allow students to learn alongside company members resulting in the performance of physical theatre integrated with technology.
