= Thierry Tidrow =

Canadian-German composer

Thierry Tidrow (born 29 September 1986) is a Franco-Ontarian composer. He currently lives in Berlin, Germany.

In 2014, he was awarded the Jules-Léger Prize for New Chamber Music, for his work, Au found du Cloître humide, commissioned by Continuum Contemporary Music (Toronto). In the same year he also received first prize at the SOCAN awards for his piece Violon et clarinette, and third prize for his opera Less Truth More Telling.

In 2015, the Akademie der Künste der Welt in Cologne commissioned his Manifeste Assi, for clarinet, flute, cello and reciter, based on texts by Natasha Kanapé Fontaine and Joséphine Bacon. This work was premiered in Cologne by Liz Hirst, Heather Roche and Niklas Seidl, with Tidrow and Fontaine reciting.

In 2016, the New Talents Biennale Cologne commissioned his work, Styroporös for ensemble hand werk. He was also a fellow at Heidelberger Frühling and his piece based on texts from Das Knaben Wunderhorn, Die alten, bösen Lieder was commissioned by the festival for Sarah Maria Sun and Johannes Fischer.

In 2018, he was the first grand prize winner of McGill’s Graham Sommer Competition for Young Composers with his work Quicksilver, written for the Molinari Quartet. That year, he also won the Berliner Opernpreis for his sci-fi opera, Prothesen der Autonomie.

In 2019, he was commissioned by Deutsche Oper am Rhein for his first children's opera, Nils Karlsson Däumling, for soprano and singing violinist. This opera has since been performed in various venues across Germany, including at the Elbphilharmonie as well as the opera houses of Bonn, Cologne, Dortmund, Dresden, Karlsruhe and Wuppertal.

From 2019 to 2022 he was composer-in-residence at Opera Dortmund, for which he wrote 5 staged works.

In 2024, Sagt der Walfisch zum Thunfisch (“Says the whale to the tuna”) was commissioned by the Vienna State Opera to mark the opening of the Neue Staatsoper (NEST), a new venue dedicated to the new opera and ballet for younger audiences.

== Works ==
- STYROPORÖS (2016) violin, cello, clarinet, flute and bowed polystyrene [8′]
- Die alten, bösen Lieder (2016) (mezzo-)soprano and percussion [9′]
- At the still point (2016) two recorders and voice [9′]
- Manifeste Assi (2015) for reciter and cello, bass clarinet and bass flute [55′]
- Et tu m’as nommée nouveau monde (2015) cello, bass clarinet, bass flute [8′]
- So be it (2015) saxophone quartet [10′]
- Clarintabile (2014) clarinet and voice [12′]
- Ricercar (2014) baroque violin [9′]
- Au fond du cloître humide (2014) flute, clarinet, violin, cello, piano and percussion [12′]
- LUFT-1098 (2015) flute, oboe, clarinet, violin, cello, harp and synthesizer [9′]
- Virelai (2013) recorder, alto flute, violin, viola, cello and trombone [9′]
- Chanson (2012) string quartet [14′]
- Fribourgeoiseries (2012) violin, violoncello, flute, clarinet, piano, harp, lupophone, contraforte [12′]
- Violon et Clarinette (2011) [7′]
- Affectations romanesques (2011) viola, violoncello, trumpet, clarinet, oboe, piano, percussion [7′]
- Unlock’d her Silent Throat (2008) horn, electric guitar, piano, two percussion, string quartet [12′]
