= The Raftsmen =

Canadian folk music group

- Origin: Montreal, Quebec, Canada
- Genres: Folk
- Years active: 1960-1970
- Labels: RCA Records, RCA Camden, Apex Records (Canada), Rodeo Records, Banff Records, Canadian Talent Library, Melbourne Records
- Past members: Louis Leroux; Martin Overland (d. 2005); Marvin Burke; Guy Pilette; Donald Steven

The Raftsmen was a Canadian folk music group, active through the 1960s, which performed Canadian and traditional folk songs. They collectively played 15 different instruments, including guitar, banjo and percussion, and sang songs in 13 languages.

== History ==
The Raftsmen was formed by Louis Leroux, Martin Overland and Marvin Burke. Overland had been the lead singer/guitarist/music arranger for the 1950s Montreal trio The Strangers, along with his sister Arlene on claves and drummer Leon Segal.

The band made a number of recordings for RCA (RCA Camden in the United States), and performed in both Miami and Montreal in 1962. In 1963, they also recorded an album in Montreal, A Night at Le Pavillon, based on a live folk performance. That year, the band performed on Let's Sing Out, a CTV Television Network series hosted by folk singer Oscar Brand. The band recorded a track for the RCA Victor compilation album All-Star All-Time Folk Festival.

In 1964, the group were guests on Brand's radio show in Montreal. The Raftsmen's single (on Apex Records) of Brand’s "Something to Sing About" sold nationally and appeared on local radio charts during the time period leading up to the Canadian centennial in 1967.

Overland and Burke later left the band, and Leroux, bassist Guy Pilette, and 12-string guitarist and arranger Donald Steven, formed a successor band known as The New Raftsmen, The Raftsmen III, and again The Raftsmen. This group toured and performed primarily in Eastern Canada and recorded for Banff, Rodeo, Melbourne, and 20th Century Fox Records. Its single of Gordon Lightfoot's "The Hands I Love" (known also as "Song for a Winter's Night") received considerable air play.

Leroux later toured with Nana Mouskouri for the better part of ten years, then became a Latin guitar player in session work and released a pair of instrumental solo albums. He subsequently taught flamenco-style guitar technique.

== Discography ==
=== Albums ===
- Down in the Valley, 1961, RCA Victor
- This Land Is Your Land, 1963, RCA Camden
- The Raftsmen, 1963, Canadian Talent Library
- Here and There With the Raftsmen, 1964, RCA Victor
- A Night At Le Pavillon, 1965, RCA
- On Target (as The Raftsmen III), 1967, Banff Records
- The Raftsmen, 1967, Rodeo Records

=== Singles ===
- "Yellow Bird" (Choucounne) (P'tits Oiseaux)/"Shame and Scandal" (7"), 1961, RCA Victor
- "Last Night I Had the Strangest Dream"/"Walking on the Green Grass", 1962, RCA Victor
- "Down in the Valley"/"Tarrytown", 1962, RCA Victor
- "The Drinkin' Gourd"/"Rubbery Scrubbedy", 1962, RCA Victor
- "Aye, Pepina"/"Pour Toi Seule", 1964, Apex
- "Something To Sing About"/" Kelligrew's Soiree", 1964, Apex
- "Hands I Love"/"Haunted House", 1967, Melbourne Records & 20th Century Fox
- "Song For A Nation"/"Goodbye To All My Dreams", 1968, Melbourne Records
