= Vahram Sargsyan =

Armenian-Canadian composer, choral conductor and experimental vocalist

- Born: May 28, 1981 (age 45); Yerevan, Armenia
- Occupations: Composer, Choral Conductor
- Years active: 1998–present

Vahram Sargsyan (Armenian: Վահրամ Սարգսյան; also spelled Sarkissian) is an Armenian-Canadian composer, choral conductor and vocalist based in Montreal, Quebec, Canada.

His work spans chamber, choral, and vocal music and often engages contemporary compositional practices and extended vocal techniques. He was awarded the Jules Léger Prize for New Chamber Music in 2023 for his composition Quiet Songs.

== Biography ==
Vahram Sargsyan studied composition with Ashot Zohrabyan at the Yerevan Komitas State Conservatory from 1998 to 2003, while also studying choral conducting with Tigran Hekekyan, which he completed in 2006. He later pursued graduate-level composition studies at the Schulich School of Music, McGill University, working with composer Philippe Leroux.

Sargsyan’s music has been performed internationally in Europe, North America, and Asia, including performances in Armenia, the United Kingdom, Germany, Austria, Sweden, Japan, and the United States. His composition Luys Zvart was performed at the 6th World Symposium on Choral Music (Minneapolis, Minnesota, 2002).

His arrangement of Khorurd Metz (Great Mystery) was published in Oxford University Press's anthology World Carols for Choirs (2005) and has been recorded by BBC Singers. It has been broadcast by BBC Radio 3.

Sargsyan has received commissions from Oxford University Press, Norddeutscher Rundfunk, and AGBU Foundation, CBC Radio and others. His work Hunting the Hunter was premiered under his own baton in 2012 at Carnegie Hall.

In addition to his compositional work, Sargsyan is active as a lecturer and workshop leader, presenting on extended vocal techniques and contemporary choral practices. His workshops and presentations have been featured at international choral festivals and conferences, including the World Symposium on Choral Music, Europa Cantat, the ACDA Regional Conference, and PODIUM Conference among others.

Vahram Sargsyan is a member of Composers' Union of Armenia, Canadian League of Composers, and Canadian Music Centre.

== Awards ==
- Artiste de l’année à Laval (Quebec, Canada 2024)
- Jules Léger Prize for New Chamber Music (Canada 2023), for Quiet Songs
- Winner, POLYPHONOS 2017 Commission Competition (Seattle, United States, 2016)
- Third Prize, Godfrey Ridout Award from the SOCAN Foundation (Canada, 2012), for Tribulationes
- Winner, 3rd BCE Commission Competition (Boston, United States, 2010), for Tribulationes
- First Prize, International Contest for New Choral Compositions (Petrinja, Croatia, 2009), for Anegh Bnutiun
- Award, World Armenian Congress “for creative achievements” (2009), for Mythis
- Co-winner, European Seminar for Young Composers (Aosta, Italy, 2008), for Laudate Dominum
- Co-winner, Choral Composition Competition (Yerevan, Armenia, 2006), for Tantum ergo

== Selected works ==
=== Orchestral ===
- Ter yete - God, if (cantata), mixed chorus, large orchestra (64 players), 2003
- Mythis, 18 strings, 2008

=== Chamber music ===
- Five Images, cello, piano, 1996
- Poem, cello, piano, 1998
- Sonatina, clarinet, piano, 1999
- String Quartet, 2000
- Music for 13, large ensemble (13 players), 2002
- Selbstvergessenheit, 2 clarinets, cello, piano, 2006
- Deux Silhouettes Féminines (texts by Paul Fort, Yeghishe Charents), soprano, clarinet, violin, cello, piano, 2007
- Hunting the Hunter, clarinet, marimba, 2 violins, viola, cello, piano, 2012
- deperson, flute, clarinet, violin, cello, piano, 2013
- Gandz, large ensemble, 2013

=== Choral ===
- Tkhur meran - Sadly Departed (text by Vahan Terian), female chorus, 1999
- Kesgisher - Midnight (text by Vahan Terian), mixed chorus, 1999
- Voghormya - Lord, Have Mercy (text from Psalm 50 [Armenian translation]), mixed chorus, 2000
- Luys Zvart - Joyful Light (text from an ancient Greek sacred text [Armenian translation]), female chorus, 2001 (also version for mixed chorus, 2006)
- Lux aeterna, mixed chorus, 2004
- Tantum ergo (text by St. Thomas Aquinas), mixed chorus, 2006
- Domine Deus (text from the Gloria), 7 mixed voices, 2007
- Laudate Dominum (text from Psalm 150), mixed chorus, 2008
- Anegh Bnutiun (text by St. Nerses Shnorhali), female chorus, 2008 (also version for male chorus, 2009)
- Dzaynik (text by Komitas Vardapet), female chorus, 2009
- Ilik (folk text), female chorus, 2009
- Stabat Mater, mixed chorus, 2010
- Tribulationes (excerpts from the Psalms), mixed chorus, 2010
- Wage Peace (text by Judyth Hill), mixed chorus, 2011

=== Piano ===
- Visions, 1997
- Variations, 1999

=== Arrangements ===
- Sirt im sasani - My Heart Is Grieving over Judas (13th-century Armenian choral), mixed chorus, 2002;
- Khorurd metz (Movses Khorenatsi), mixed chorus, 2002
- Ousti Guqas (Sayat-Nova), clarinet, marimba, cello, 2012
