= Serge Garant =

Canadian composer, conductor, critic, professor and radio host (1929–1986)

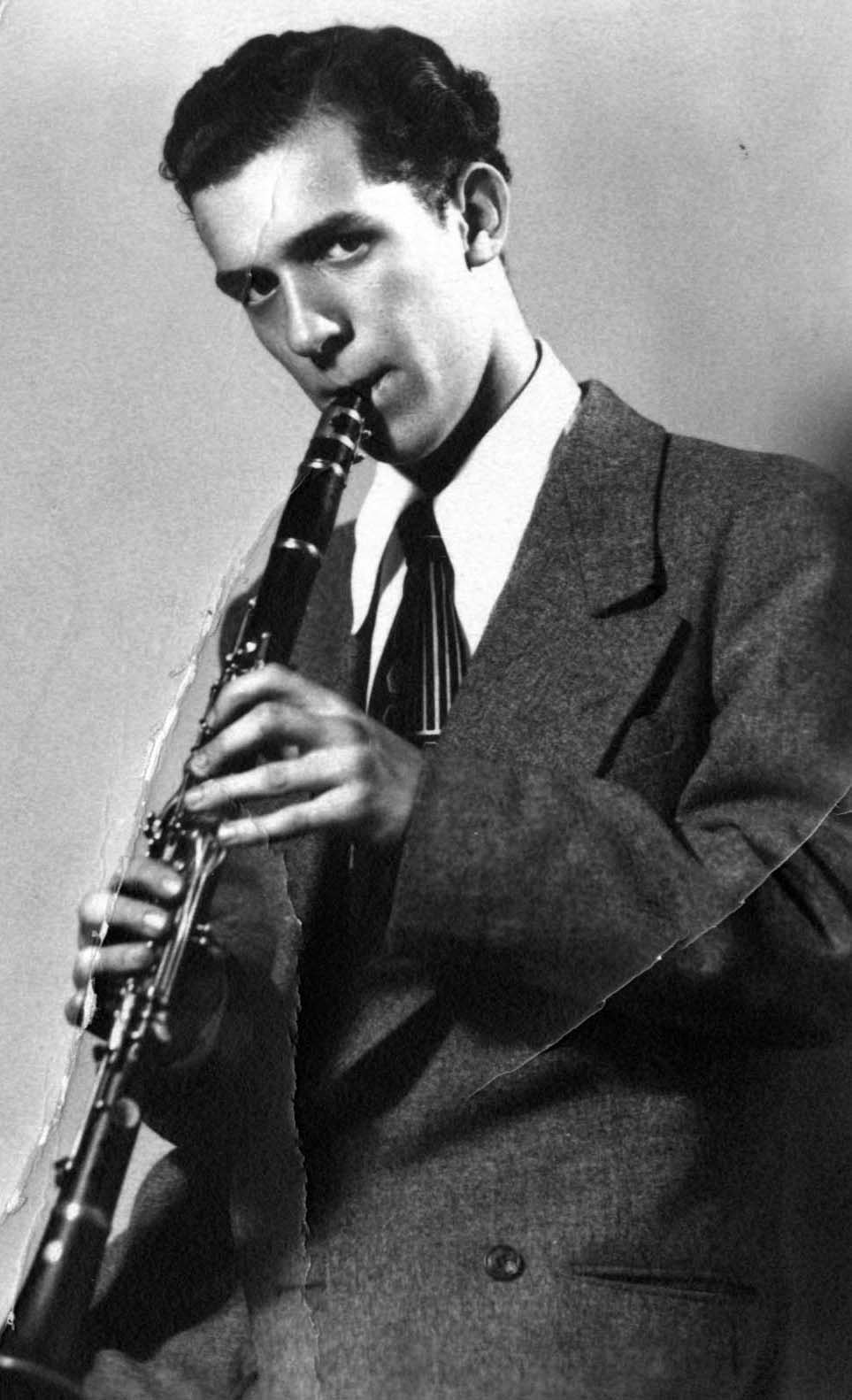
- Garant in 1946
- Born: September 22, 1929
- Died: November 1, 1986 (aged 57)
- Occupations: Composer; conductor; teacher

Albert Antonio Serge Garant, OC (September 22, 1929 – November 1, 1986) was a Canadian composer, conductor, music critic, professor of music at the University of Montreal and radio host of Musique de notre siècle on Radio-Canada. In 1966, with Jean Papineau-Couture, Maryvonne Kendergi, Wilfrid Pelletier and Hugh Davidson, he co-founded the Société de musique contemporaine du Québec. In 1979, he was made an Officer of the Order of Canada. The Prix Serge-Garant award was created in his honor by the Fondation Émile Nelligan. Among his notable pupils were Walter Boudreau, Marcelle Deschênes, Denis Gougeon, Richard Grégoire, Anne Lauber, Michel Longtin, Nicole Rodrigue, and Myke Roy.

== Early life and education ==
Serge was born September 22, 1929, in Quebec. His interest in music came from his mother. He attended the Sacred Heart of Jesus Elementary School in Quebec City for three consecutive years (1936–1939). Because of the Great Depression, the Garant family moved from Quebec to L'Ancienne-Lorette in 1940, then to Verdun in 1941, and eventually settled in Sherbrooke in 1941. Continuing his schooling over these relocations, Serge Garant finished his ninth year at St. John the Baptist School in Sherbrooke in 1945. During his studies, Garant developed a particular interest in the clarinet. In 1946, Garant taught himself how to play the saxophone.

Garant chose to dedicate himself to learning piano, where he was initially supervised by Sylvio Lacharité, one of the creators of the Symphony Orchestra of Sherbrooke. In the school orchestra Pierre Monteux, Garant took interest in writing music through his contact with Lacharité. In 1946, he wrote "Conte" (a version for strings, flute and clarinet), a work that he presented at the Youth Festival in 1949. Thereafter, Garant continued his piano studies in Montreal with Yvonne Hubert. In 1951, Garant went to Paris; Serge Garant followed the lessons of Andree Vaurabourg-Honegger and Messiaen.

== Career ==
=== Teaching ===
The first experience of teaching for Serge Garant likely traced back to the summer of 1951, when he was invited to participate in the camp musical Knowlton. However, it was not until 1967 that Garant was invited by the Dean of the Faculty of Music at the University of Montreal to teach the twentieth-century composition analysis class. Garant was then granted tenure in 1971.

As part of his academic musical education, Garant wanted to be objective and not judge his students' compositions according to his own values, but rather in terms of what students wanted to do and what they did. These comments are supported by a student who attended his classes: "You could come up with any crazy idea, [...]. Read in any style, as long as we knew what we wanted."

In 1986, Garant ended his teaching duties due to illness. However, Garant communicated by telephone from the hospital to assign grades to his students through another professor of music from the University of Montreal.

=== Radio host ===
Serge Garant participated in several radio programs as an expert, but his career as a host for CBC began in 1955 with Do-Mi-Sol and continued through Sur nos ondes (1957–1958) and Musique de notre siècle (1969–1985). Serge Garant identified himself as a "serial music" composer. He explored the musicals with new origins.

== Death ==
Garant died on November 1, 1986, in Sherbrooke, Quebec.

== Distinctions ==
- 1971 – Canada Council of Music Medal
- 1979 – Prix Calixa-Lavallée from the Société Saint-Jean-Baptiste in Montréal
- 1979 – Officer of the Order of Canada
- 1980 – Prix Jules-Léger for new music
- 1984 – The Canada Council for the Arts music prize
- 1986 – Member of the Royal Society of Canada

== Selected works ==
- Concerts sur terre
- Caprices
- Nucléogame
- Trois pièces pour quatuor à cordes
- Musique pour la mort d'un poète
- Ouranos

== See also ==
- Music of Canada
- List of Canadian composers
