= Calixa-Lavallée Award =

Canadian music award

The Calixa-Lavallée Award (French: Prix Calixa-Lavallée) is a music award created in 1959. It is granted by the Saint-Jean-Baptiste Society of Montreal (SSJBM) to a Quebecer having distinguished themself in the field of music. It was named after musician Calixa Lavallée, composer of the Canadian national anthem, "O Canada".

== Laureates ==
- 1959: Léopold Simoneau
- 1959: Pierrette Alarie
- 1960: Jacques Beaudry
- 1961: Françoise Aubut-Pratte
- 1962: Jean Papineau-Couture
- 1963: Gilles Lefebvre
- 1964: Victor Bouchard and Renée Morisset
- 1965: Louis Quilico
- 1966: Gilles Vigneault
- 1967: Joseph Rouleau
- 1968: Gilles Tremblay
- 1969: Roger Matton
- 1970: Clermont Pépin
- 1971: Colette Boky
- 1972: Claire Gagnier
- 1973: Gaston Germain
- 1974: Pauline Julien
- 1975: Félix Leclerc
- 1976: Jean Carignan
- 1977: Lionel Daunais
- 1979: Monique Leyrac
- 1980: Serge Garant
- 1981: Kenneth Gilbert
- 1982: Marie-Thérèse Paquin
- 1983: Gilles Potvin
- 1985: Maryvonne Kendergi
- 1987: Yvonne Hubert
- 1988: Jean Cousineau
- 1989: Bernard Lagacé
- 1990: Otto Joachim
- 1991: Louise André
- 1993: Fernand Lindsay
- 1996: Angèle Dubeau
- 2003: Charlie Biddle
- 2012: Alain Lefèvre

== See also ==
- Félix Award
