= Ohm: The Early Gurus of Electronic Music =

OHM: The Early Gurus of Electronic Music

Compilation album
- Released: 2000
- Recorded: 1948 – 1980
- Length: 3 CDs
- Label: Ellipsis Arts
- Producer: Thomas Ziegler, Jason Gross, and Russell Charno

Professional ratings
Review scores
Source	Rating
AllMusic	5/5 stars
Pitchfork	9/10

OHM: The Early Gurus of Electronic Music is a compilation of early electronic music and excerpts from 1948 to 1980. Many works are essentially experiments with sound, using a variety of non-traditional instruments including homemade circuits, tape ribbon, and early synthesisers.

Artists featured in the compilation include:

- Maryanne Amacher
- Robert Ashley
- Milton Babbitt
- Louis and Bebe Barron
- François Bayle
- David Behrman
- John Cage
- John Chowning
- Alvin Curran
- Holger Czukay
- Tod Dockstader
- Charles Dodge
- Herbert Eimert and Robert Beyer
- Brian Eno
- Luc Ferrari
- Jon Hassell
- Paul Lansky
- Hugh Le Caine
- Alvin Lucier
- Otto Luening
- Richard Maxfield
- Olivier Messiaen
- Musica Elettronica Viva (MEV)
- Pauline Oliveros
- Bernard Parmegiani
- Steve Reich
- Terry Riley
- Jean-Claude Risset
- Clara Rockmore
- Oskar Sala
- Pierre Schaeffer
- Klaus Schulze
- Raymond Scott
- Laurie Spiegel
- Karlheinz Stockhausen
- Morton Subotnick
- David Tudor
- Vladimir Ussachevsky
- Edgard Varèse
- Iannis Xenakis
- La Monte Young
- Joji Yuasa
