= John Burge =

Canadian composer, music educator, and pianist

John David Bryson Burge (born 2 January 1961) is a Canadian composer, music educator, and pianist. He has won a number of awards for his compositions, including the Alberta Culture Award (1982), the William Erving Fairclough Scholarship (1983), second prize in the Ithaca College Choral Composition Contest and Festival (1984), and five PROCAN Young Composers' Competition prizes between 1985 and 1988 among others. In 2009 he won the Juno Award for Classical Composition of the Year for his Flanders Fields Reflections. Some music critics have likened his compositional style to that of Benjamin Britten and Maxwell Davies.

Born in Dryden, Ontario, Burge earned his ARCT in piano from The Royal Conservatory of Music in 1979. He studied at the University of Toronto, earning a bachelor's degree in 1983 and a master's degree in 1984. He earned a Doctor of Musical Arts from the University of British Columbia in 1989. Among his teachers in music composition were John Beckwith, Stephen Chatman, Walter Buczynski, John Hawkins, and Derek Holman.

In 1987 Burge joined the music faculty at Queen's University where he taught music theory, analysis and composition. He also served as the director of the Queen's School of Music from 2006 to 2010. He retired from teaching at Queen's University in June of 2025, and now holds the title of Professor Emeritus.

Burge's compositions have been performed by numerous notable ensembles, including the BBC Singers, the Elmer Iseler Singers, the Hart House Chorus, the Nepean Symphony Orchestra, the Thirteen Strings Chamber Orchestra, the New York City Gay Men's Chorus, and the Michigan State University Children's Choir. His opera The Master's House was commissioned by the Opera Lyra Ottawa and premiered by the organization in 1984. In 1986 the Choir of Christ Church Cathedral performed his "So Great Is God's Love" with Diana, Princess of Wales and Charles, Prince of Wales in attendance. In 2004 his Clarinet Concerto was premiered by the Kingston Symphony. In 2025 his Violin Concerto was premiered by the Kingston Symphony at the Isabel Bader Centre for the Performing Arts.
