= Micheline Coulombe Saint-Marcoux =

Canadian composer (1938–1985)

Micheline Coulombe Saint-Marcoux (9 August 1938 – 2 February 1985) was a Canadian composer and music educator who played an important role in the contemporary classical music scene of Canada and France from the late 1960s through the mid-1980s. An associate of the Canadian Music Centre, she was commissioned to write works by the Montreal Symphony Orchestra, the Canadian Broadcast Corporation, and the Quebec Contemporary Music Society.

== Life and career ==
Born in La Doré, Quebec, Saint-Marcoux studied at the École de musique Vincent-d'Indy, the Conservatoire de musique du Québec à Montréal (CMQM), and the Conservatoire de Paris. Her teachers included Gilbert Amy, Françoise Aubut, François Brassard, Claude Champagne, Jean-Pierre Guézec, Yvonne Hubert, Clermont Pépin, Pierre Schaeffer, and Gilles Tremblay. In 1967, she was the first woman to be awarded the Prix d'Europe for composition with Modulaire for orchestra. In 1969 she co-founded the Groupe international de musique électroacoustique de Paris and in 1971 she was a co-founder of the Montréal percussion group Ensemble Polycousmie. From 1971 until her death in Montréal in 1984 she taught on the faculty of the CMQM.
