= Marcelle Deschênes =

Canadian artist

Marcelle Deschênes-Harvey born in Price near Rimouski, Québec (born 2 March 1939) is a Canadian multi-media artist, music educator and composer of electroacoustic music. She was a professor at the University of Montreal.

== Early life and education ==
Marcelle Deschênes was born near Rimouski, Quebec. She graduated with a bachelor's and master's degree from the University of Montreal, studying from 1963 to 1967 with Jean Papineau-Couture and Serge Garant. She continued her education in France with François Bayle, Henri Chiarucci, and Guy Reibel of the Groupe de Recherches musicales de Paris. She also studied audio-visual techniques at the Pierre Schaeffer's Conservatoire and analysis at the École César-Franck with Olivier Alain. At the University of Paris, she studied with Daniel Charles, Claude Laloum and Jean-Étienne Marie.

== Career ==
While completing her studies, Deschênes created several multi-media works. She returned to Canada in 1971 and took a teaching and research position at the electronic music studio of Laval University, where she helped organize a sound library and composed the soundtracks for several films. In 1979 she founded the electroacoustic studio Bruit Blanc.

In 1980 Deschênes took a position as professor of music at the University of Montreal, teaching the composition of electroacoustic music. In collaboration with visual artists, she continued to create and exhibit multimedia projects, including OPÉRAaaaAH! in 1983.

== Honors and awards ==
- First prize for mixed-media music at the sixth Concours international de musique électroacoustique in Bourges in 1978
- Gold medal at the Multi-Images international competition in Munich (1989)

== Works ==
Deschênes composes multimedia works and film soundtracks. Selected works include:

- 1 1/2 (1966)
- Voz (cantate mitrailleuse) (1968)
- 7+7+7+7 ou aussi progressions sur la circonférence du jaune au rouge par l'orange ou du rouge au bleu par le violet, ou même embrassant le pourtour total (1968)
- Talilalilalilalarequiem (1970)
- Amertube film soundtrack (1973)
- Le Phasé mou film soundtrack (1973)
- Le Port de Montréal film soundtrack (1975)
- Moll, Opéra-Lilliput pour six roches molles (1976)
- OPÉRAaaaAH! (1983)
- L'Écran humain, (1983)
- deUSirae (1985)
- Lux (1985) in collaboration with Renée Bourassa
- Big Bang (1987)
- Noël réinventé (1988)
- Ludi (1990), opera-theatre work with Renée Bourassa

Her works have been recorded and issued on CD, including:

- Big Bang II (1990)
- Halogènes (1991)
