= Maryvonne Kendergi =

Canadian musicologist (1915–2011)

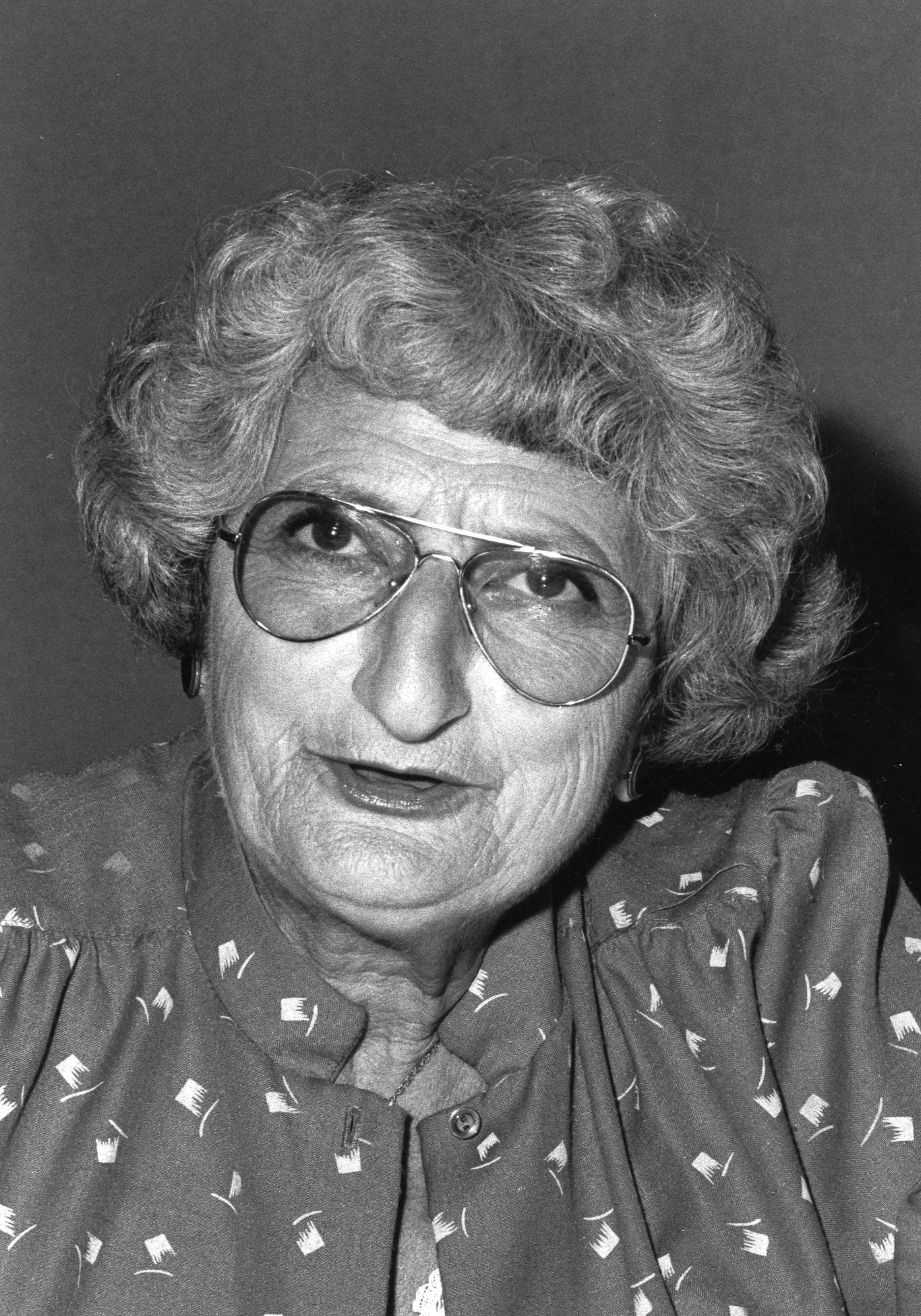
- Kendergi in 1988
- Born: 15 August 1915; Aintab, Aleppo Vilayet, Ottoman Empire
- Died: 27 September 2011 (aged 96); Montreal, Quebec, Canada
- Occupation: Musicologist

Maryvonne Kendergi or Kendergian, OC CQ (15 August 1915 – 27 September 2011) was a Canadian-Armenian writer, professor, musicologist, pianist, and Québécois commentator.

== Life ==
Kendergi was born 15 August 1915 in Aintab to an Armenian family. Due to the Armenian genocide she fled to Syria, where she grew up, then moved to France. At the Sorbonne, she studied and gained an advanced degree in 1942. She moved to Canada in 1952, and became a Canadian citizen in 1960.

For ten years she hosted radio programs on contemporary music on Radio-Canada and also appeared regularly on television. She taught at the Université de Montréal. She played an important role in the founding of the Quebec Contemporary Music Society in 1966. She was a past president of the Canadian Music Council.

Kendergi was appointed a Member of the Order of Canada in 1980, and promoted to an Officer of the Order in 1992. She was made a Chevalier in the Order of Quebec in 1985.

== Death ==
Kendergi died on 27 September 2011 in Montreal, Quebec. She was entombed at the Notre Dame des Neiges Cemetery.

== Honours ==
- 1980 – Member of the Order of Canada
- 1982 – Canadian Music Council Medal
- 1983 – The Lynch-Staunton Prize
- 1985 – Chevalier de l'Ordre national du Québec
- 1985 – Prix Calixa-Lavallée
- 1992 – Officer of the Order of Canada
- 1994 – Medal of the Académie des lettres du Québec
- 2000 – Prix Opus, hommage
