= Pierre Alexandre Tremblay =

Canadian electroacoustic music composer (born 1975)

Pierre Alexandre Tremblay (born March 13, 1975) is a Canadian electroacoustic music composer who was born in Montreal, Quebec, and currently living in Huddersfield, England, UK.

== Recordings ==
- Alter ego (empreintes DIGITALes, IMED 0680, 2006)
- la rage (empreintes DIGITALes, IMED 0999, 2009)
- La marée (empreintes DIGITALes, IMED 13123, 2013)

== List of works ==
- au Croisé, le silence, seul, tient lieu de parole (2000)
- autoportrait (2001)
- Binary (Virtual Rapper Remix) (1998)
- la cloche fêlée (2004)
- Fiez-vous sur moi (1995)
- fugue; qui sent le temps? (1997)
- La rage (2004–2005), free jazz drummer and electronics
- Walk That Way. Tuesday, Turn. (2006), videomusic
- Le tombeau des fondeurs (2008), Baschet-Malbus piano
- Un clou, son marteau et le baton (2008-2009), piano and electronics (written for Sarah Nicholls)
- La rupture inéluctable (2010-2011), bass clarinet and electronics (written for Heather Roche)
