= Something to Sing About =

Song

Song
- Songwriter(s): Oscar Brand

"Something to Sing About" (actual title: "This Land of Ours") is one of Canada's national songs, a patriotic song written by folk singer Oscar Brand that sings the praises of the many different regions of Canada. It has some similarities to "Scotland the Brave". It was used as a theme for Brand's television show Let's Sing Out, which aired on CBC and CTV in the 1960s, and was also the theme song for the Canadian pavilion at Expo 67. There was once a movement for it to chosen as Canada's national anthem in 1965, though Parliament ultimately picked "O Canada".

Brand for some years used an Americanized lyric of "Something to Sing About" as a theme song for his Folksong Festival radio program on WNYC in New York City.

It has been recorded by, among others, the Raftsmen and the Travellers.

The first line refers to walking on the Grand Banks of Newfoundland, which is generally impossible because the Grand Banks are underwater. Being from Manitoba, the author did not know this when he wrote the words.

== See also ==
- Canadian patriotic music
