= Paul Crawford (composer) =

Canadian musician

Paul Duncan Crawford (born 21 August 1947, Toronto) is a Canadian composer, radio producer, organist, and music educator. In 1967 he received a licentiate diploma from Trinity College London and in 1971 he earned a Bachelor of Music degree from McGill University.
