= Laurie Spiegel =

American composer (born 1945)

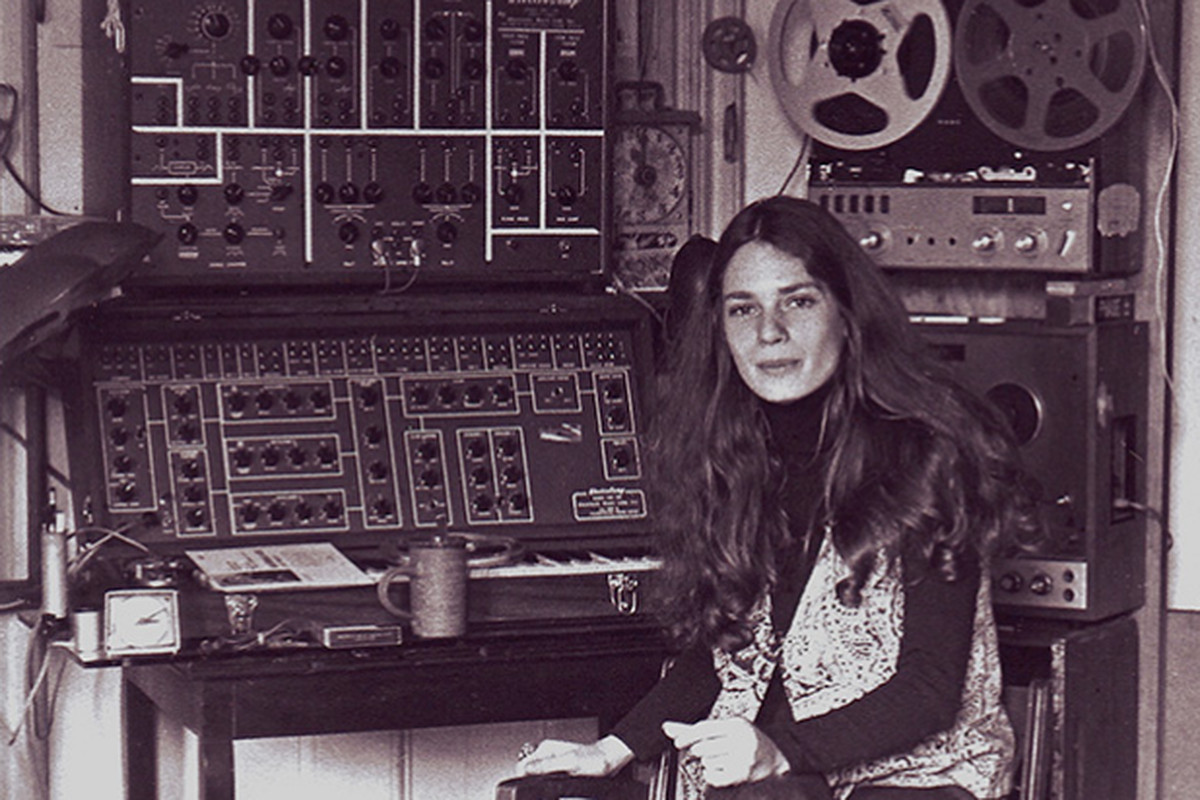
- Laurie Spiegel in an electronic music studio

Background information
- Born: September 20, 1945 (age 81); Chicago, Illinois, US
- Genres: Electronic, algorithmic composition, computer music
- Occupation: Composer
- Instruments: Synthesizer, Music Mouse, guitar, lute
- Years active: 1973–present
- Website: retiary.org/ls/

Laurie Spiegel (born September 20, 1945) is an American composer and software engineer. She has worked at Bell Labs and in computer graphics, and is known primarily for her electronic music compositions and her algorithmic composition software Music Mouse. She is also a guitarist and lutenist.

Spiegel's musical interpretation of Johannes Kepler's Harmonice Mundi appeared on the "Sounds of Earth" section of the Voyager Golden Record. Her 1972 piece "Sediment" was included in the 2012 film The Hunger Games.

In 2019, she was inducted into the National Women's Hall of Fame.

== Education ==
Spiegel was born on September 20, 1945, in Chicago. Her early musical experiences were largely self-directed, beginning with the mandolin, guitar, and banjo she had as a child, which she learned to play by ear. She became interested in electronics after using a tape-operated computer at Purdue University as part of a high school class field trip. At the age of 20, she taught herself music notation, after which she began writing down her compositions.

Spiegel attended Shimer College in Naperville, Illinois, through the school's early entrance program. She subsequently spent a year at the University of Oxford through an exchange program at Shimer. After receiving her bachelor's degree in sociology from Shimer in 1967, she stayed in Oxford for an additional year, commuting to London to study guitar, music theory, and composition with John W. Duarte.

After moving to Manhattan, where she briefly worked in social sciences research and documentary film, she studied composition under Jacob Druckman, Vincent Persichetti, and Hall Overton at the Juilliard School from 1969 to 1972 and privately with Emmanuel Ghent. Spiegel felt like an outsider at Juilliard, perceiving her interests to be at odds with "the post-Webernite, serialist, atonal, blip and bleep school of music" which was then dominant in academia. She forged connections outside of Juilliard by working in shared studio spaces around New York, such as the Columbia-Princeton Electronic Music Center, to which her composition teacher had granted her access.

She subsequently became Druckman's assistant and followed him to Brooklyn College, completing her master's degree in composition there in 1975 and pursuing research in early American music under the direction of H. Wiley Hitchcock.

== Career ==
Best known for her use of algorithmic composition techniques, Spiegel worked with Buchla and Electronic Music Laboratories synthesizers and digital systems including Bell Labs' GROOVE system (1973–1978), the Bell Labs Digital Synthesizer (1977), the alphaSyntauri synthesizer system for the Apple II computer (1978–1981), and the McLeyvier (1981–1985). In various pieces, Spiegel has used musical algorithms to simulate natural phenomena, emulate tonal harmony rules, and sonically represent large data sets. In her piece Viroid, she used the genetic code of a simple organism to determine the pitches produced by a synthesizer. In her 1977 piece Improvisation on a Concerto Generator, she used an algorithm designed to replicate Johann Sebastian Bach's "chorale-style harmonic progressions." Spiegel views algorithmic music as a natural extension to the rule-based systems of traditional Western music, such as counterpoint and voice leading, and her ultimate goal in using such techniques is to automate logical musical tasks in order to "focus more completely on the aspects of music that I cannot reduce to logic."

Spiegel's best known and most widely-used software is the interactive MIDI sequencer Music Mouse, an "intelligent instrument" controlled by a computer mouse and keyboard that was first released in 1986 for Macintosh, Amiga, and Atari computers. In addition to improvisations using this software, Spiegel composed several works using Music Mouse including "Cavis muris" in 1986, "Three Sonic Spaces" in 1989, and "Sound Zones" in 1990. In 2026, Spiegel rereleased Music Mouse for contemporary operating systems in partnership with Eventide, Inc.

In addition to electronics and computer-based music, Spiegel has composed works for piano, guitar and other solo instruments and small orchestra, as well as drawings, photography, video art, writings, and computer software. Spiegel wrote one of the first drawing or painting programs at Bell Labs, which she expanded to include interactive video and synchronous audio output in the mid-1970s.

Spiegel was a video artist in residence at the Experimental Television Lab at WNET in New York in 1976. She composed series music for the TV Lab's weekly "VTR—Video and Television Review" and sound effects for its film The Lathe of Heaven, both under the direction of David Loxton.

In addition to computer software development, Spiegel supported herself through by both teaching and soundtrack composition starting in the early 1970s. She had steady work throughout the decade at Spectra Films, Valkhn Films, WNET, and subsequently for various individual video artists, animators, and filmmakers. Spiegel enjoyed her brief work as a soundtrack composer, stating: "When you do soundtracks, all that really matters is emotional content."

In the 1980s, she focused on developing music software and consulting in the music technology field, as well as teaching at Cooper Union and New York University. She received a Foundation for Contemporary Arts grant in 2018.

In 2018 Spiegel's early Music for New Electronic Media was part of the Chicago New Media 1973-1992 Exhibition, curated by Jon Cates.

In 2023, she was awarded the Giga-Hertz Main Award for Electronic Music by the ZKM Center for Art and Media Karlsruhe for her life's work. In 2018, she began the process of digitally archiving her entire body of work.

== Artistry ==
Philip Sherburne of Pitchfork said: "With a programmer’s eye for detail, Spiegel renders both extended drones and folk-inspired counterpoints in the simplest of terms."

== Influence and activism ==
Spiegel's writings on the importance of musical pattern manipulation on computer music interface design has influenced the design of live coding music software environments such as TidalCycles.

Spiegel is an outspoken animal rights activist, and she has long sought to raise awareness for "underprivileged and disparaged" animals within urban landscapes, such as mice, rats, and pigeons. She learned to care for pigeons as part of a college psychology course, and began rehabilitating injured birds in Tribeca, Manhattan, after the September 11 attacks. In 2004, Spiegel started a personal effort to regularly feed local pigeons so that they could have "species appropriate" meals, and she continues to feed pigeons almost daily in Tribeca's Duane Park as of 2024.

As part of her effort to raise awareness for animal rights, Spiegel has composed several works related to urban wildlife. The most notable of these works is a 2006 audio-visual installation titled Ferals, which featured over 3,000 original photographs of New York City pigeons and a collage of pigeon sounds which attempted to sonically relate the story of "two hungry juvenile pigeons begging their parents for food." Other works focused on animal rights include Anon a Mouse (2003), a short recorded "opera" featuring a human, a dog, and a mouse; and Cavis Muris (1986), which attempted to sonically depict the mice which occupied her warehouse at the time.

Spiegel is also dedicated to the democratization and accessibility of music, and she has described this as "one of the greatest gratifications of my own work." She believes that the tools of computer music can lower the barriers to entry historically associated with music production, and that they have already increased the representation of groups which have been historically underrepresented in the industry.

== Discography ==
- The Expanding Universe, 1980. Reissued with additional material in 2012.
- 60x60 (2006-2007) released 2008. A two-CD compilation of 60-second works from the 60x60 project.
- Ooppera, 2002. Spiegel contributed to compilation album of short operas composed and performed by seven different artists.
- Harmonices Mundi (1977, released 2004). A realization of Kepler's vision of planetary motion.
- The P-ART Project - 12 Portraits, 2001. 12-composer compilation including Spiegel's "Conversational Paws".
- Obsolete Systems, 1991. A retrospective of Spiegel's work through the 70s and 80s, performed on currently obsolete electronic instruments.
- Ohm: The Early Gurus of Electronic Music, 2000. 3-CD compilation featuring Spiegel's 1974 Appalachian Grove.
- Miniatures 2 - a sequence of sixty tiny masterpieces, 2000. A 60-artist compilation soundtrack of Dan Sandin's video A Volume of Julia Sets.
- Female of the Species, a 2-CD compilation of female experimental composers
- Enhanced Gravity, 1999. Spiegel contributed to a compilation album of music and multimedia by ten different artists.
- Cocks Crow, Dogs Bark: New Compositional Intentions, 1998. Companion CD of Leonardo Music Journal #7, featuring The Unquestioned Answer, described in that journal.
- Women in Electronic Music - 1977, 1977, re-released 1998. Compilation CD of women in electronic music.
- Computer Music Journal Sound Anthology, 1996. Companion CD to the 20th Anniversary Issue of Computer Music Journal
- Unseen Worlds, 1991, re-released 1994 and 2019. Works by Laurie Spiegel.
- The Virtuoso in the Computer Age - III, 1993. Compilation CD of four electronic artists, featuring Spiegel's Cavis Muris (1986).
- Murmurs of Earth: The Voyager Interstellar Record, 1992. Music from Sounds of Earth produced to be sent up on the Voyager spacecraft, containing on excerpt of Harmonices Mundi.
- New American Music Vol. 2. Out of print LP.
- Music for New Electronic Media, 1977. Early works by several electronic composers.
