= Music Mouse =

Musical composition software

Music Mouse is an algorithmic musical composition software developed by Laurie Spiegel.

Spiegel's best known and most widely used software, "Music Mouse - An Intelligent Instrument" (1986) is for Macintosh, Amiga and Atari computers. The "intelligent instrument" name refers to the program's built-in knowledge of chord and scale convention and stylistic constraints. Automating these processes allows the user to focus on other aspects of the music in real time. In addition to improvisations using this software, Spiegel composed several works for "Music Mouse", including Cavis muris in 1986, Three Sonic Spaces in 1989, and Sound Zones in 1990. She continued to update the program through Macintosh OS 9. It remained available until 2021; as of 2023, the website is no longer active and is archived on the Wayback Machine. In 2026, Eventide rereleased it in collaboration with Spiegel.

== See also ==
- List of music software
