= István Anhalt =

Hungarian-Canadian composer (1919–2012)

István Anhalt OC FRSC
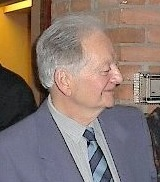
- Anhalt in 2002
- Born: April 12, 1919; Budapest, Hungary
- Died: February 24, 2012 (aged 92); Kingston, Ontario, Canada
- Occupations: Composer, teacher
- Spouse: Beate Frankenberg
- Awards: Order of Canada

István Anhalt OC FRSC (April 12, 1919 – February 24, 2012) was a Hungarian-Canadian composer and teacher.

Anhalt served as a professor of music at McGill University and founded the McGill University Electronic Music Studio. He also served as head of music at Queen's University, Kingston. His works earned him recognition as one of the pioneers of electroacoustic music in Canada. Among his pupils were Kevin Austin, John Fodi, Clifford Ford, Hugh Hartwell, John Hawkins, Alan Heard, Richard Hunt, Donald Patriquin, Nicole Rodrigue and Alex Tilley.

In 2003, he was made an Officer of the Order of Canada. In 2007, he was made a Fellow of the Royal Society of Canada.

== Early life and education ==
=== Childhood ===
István Anhalt was born in Budapest, Hungary to a Jewish family on April 12, 1919. He was the son of Arnold Anhalt and Katalin Anhalt (née Herzfeld), When he was still an infant, Anhalt's parents separated; he lived with his mother until age twelve, attending elementary school from 1925 to 1929. Although she had some interest in music and opera, his mother was not especially musical. However, there was a piano in the home and Anhalt began taking piano lessons at age six with a teacher who lived in his neighborhood and later from a family friend until he was twelve. From age ten, he attended the Dániel Berzsenyi Secondary school, failing several subjects at first, but later excelling and graduating in 1937. He also attended outdoor musical performances on Margaret Island.

At twelve, Anhalt went to live with his father, who had remarried in 1931. Encouraged by his father's love of music, Anhalt developed his ear for harmony and taught himself to play the violin. He also learned to speak four languages: Hungarian, German, French, and English.

His father's financial troubles, his half-sister's birth in 1935, and tension between him and his stepmother led Anhalt to move again a few years later to stay with his maternal grandparents. At about that time, Anhalt overheard László Gyopár, a peer from a neighboring school, play a piano piece that he had composed himself. Anhalt recognized the influence of Bach and, admiring Gyopár's compositional achievement, decided to learn how to write music and compose on his own. Anhalt and Gyopár became friends and, soon after, Anhalt began to receive private harmony lessons with Géza Falk. Gyopár was attending the Academy of Music at the time, where Anhalt audited Zoltán Kodály's class in 1936-37 before passing the entrance exam and joining his friend at the academy.

Anhalt studied piano with Kodaly at the Franz Liszt Academy of Music; he graduated with exceptional marks in 1941. He also continued his studies for the next year and a half by attending classes from Turkish linguistics to Folklore at Pázmány University and attending a seminar by János Ferencsik for conductors.

=== World War II and aftermath ===
Anhalt was drafted into the forced labour service of the Hungarian Army in 1940 during World War II.

In 1942, Anhalt and his best friend at the academy were both forced to enter a forced-labour brigade for Jewish men. Anhalt's friend was killed by a soldier in the unit. Anhalt escaped from the brigade, disguised himself as a seminarian, and hid until the war was over. He then made his way to Paris, where he had access to music teachers and abundant artistic stimulation.

In the late 1940s, he studied under Louis Fourestier, Nadia Boulanger and Soulima Stravinsky before emigrating to Canada in 1949.

== Career ==
=== Emigration to Canada and academic position ===
Anhalt emigrated to Canada as a recipient of a Lady Davis Fellowship. He settled in Montreal, and soon met Beate Frankenberg, a biochemist. They married in 1952; the couple had two daughters, Carol Greaves and Helen Jennifer Marcello.

From 1949-71 Anhalt taught analysis and composition at McGill University's Faculty of Music, where he established the theory and composition departments, He developed the music composition program, was chair of the theory department, and developed and directed the McGill University Electronic Music Studio. He also composed during this period.

Anhalt met George Rochberg at an international composers' conference at the Stratford Festival during the summer of 1960. The two became friends, resulting in an extensive correspondence, selections from which were eventually published in 2007. Like Anhalt, Rochberg, who was born in New Jersey, came from a Jewish background.

=== 1971–1984, move to Kingston ===
In 1971, Anhalt moved to Kingston, Ontario where he became the head of the music department at Queen's University. He remained in the position until 1981, and continued to teach until his retirement in 1984. His composition La Tourangelle premiered in 1975, and soon after he began to work on what became his second opera, Winthrop. He also worked on the scholarly monograph, Alternative Voices. He mentored a number of students, many of whom stayed in touch with him after his retirement.

=== Retirement and death ===
Anhalt continued to compose and write in his later years.

The Anhalt portrait in the Canadian Composers Portraits series was released in 2004.

He died on February 24, 2012, at St. Mary's of the Lake Hospital in Kingston.

== Compositional periods ==
Anhalt was one of the early composers of electronic music. His music underwent changes over the years, and can be divided into four periods. Anhalt was a librettist for his dramatic works, beginning in 1969 with Foci, and ending in 1999 with Millennial Mall.

=== 1919–1958 ===
Anhalt wrote a variety of works for chorus, solo voice, ensembles, and instrumental soloists. This period ended with the completion of his First Symphony, which won Anhalt both national and international recognition.

=== 1959–1961 ===
The next brief period in Anhalt's musical career was dedicated to electronic music where he produced four compositions that reflected his close study of the newest developments and media.

=== 1962–1971 ===
From 1962 until 1971 Anhalt reworked, consolidated and expanded on his experiences of the two previous periods. He combined electronic sounds with the sounds of the chorus or the orchestra in his Symphony of Modules, Foci, and Cento. Anhalt adopted a more flexible syntax, as well as a larger musical vocabulary to create new vocal and instrumental sounds. He also began to use timbre, timing, and musical densities in new ways.

=== 1971–2012 ===
La Tourangelle is the first of three large-scale works created by Anhalt after 1971. It is an hour-long piece that premiered in 1975 in a performance broadcast by CBC Radio. This "musical tableau" was composed for an orchestra of 16 players, five singer-narrators, and pre-recorded tapes for five operators. Its theme is the pursuit of God and meaning, and is based on the life of one of the earliest French women to settle in Canada, Marie de l’Incarnation.

Winthrop is a complementary piece to La Tourangelle, but focused on English Canada. The story is based on John Winthrop, a 17th-century Englishman who was the founder and governor of Boston, Massachusetts. Completed in March 1983, the work calls for a mixed choir, six solo singers, an instrumental ensemble of 30 players and a boys’ choir. Anhalt described this "musical pageant" as an exploration into the spiritual and personal aspects of a man, depicting how these supply meaning and significance to his actions.

Published in 1984, Alternative Voices examines linguistics as a way of acquiring an understanding of the potential of the human voice in choral and contemporary vocal contexts. In the late 1960s Anhalt had introduced the study of voice as a reflection of personality in his composition classes ; he concentrated on this research while on a sabbatical in 1976-77.

In Alternative Voices, Anhalt makes recurrent references to Canadian composers and their music. He discusses the role of Canadian music and composers in the context of current thought in Western art, music, and philosophy. Rhythm, theatre, poetry, performing techniques, sound, speech, and the roots of language and music are explored, their components interconnected, and their usage examined.

The publication of Alternative Voices and the completion of Winthrop coincided with the year of Anhalt's retirement.

== Compositions ==
Stage

- La Tourangelle. 1975
- Winthrop. 1986
- Traces (Tikkun), opera. 1996
- Millennial Mall (Lady Diotima's Walk), opera. 1999

Orchestra

- Interludium, small orchestra. 1950
- Funeral Music, small orchestra. 1951 (Montreal 1954)
- Symphony, orchestra. 1958 (Montreal 1959), BMIC 1963
- Symphony of Modules, orchestra, tape. 1967
- Simulacrum, orchestra. 1987 (Ott 1987)
- SparkskrapS, orchestra. 1988 (Toronto 1988)
- Sonance•Resonance (Welche Töne?), orchestra. 1989 (Toronto 1989)
- Twilight Fire (Baucis' and Philemon's Feast), orchestra. 2001
- The Tents of Abraham (A Mirage), orchestra. Premiered 2004

Chamber

- Trio. 1953
- Sonata, violin and piano.
- Foci, soprano, chamber ensemble, tape. 1969, Ber 1972.
- Doors ... Shadows (Glenn Gould In Memory), string quartet. 1992

Piano

- Arc en ciel, ballet, two pianos. 1951 (Montreal 1952)
- Sonata. 1951
- Fantasia. 1954. Ber 1972.

Choir

- The Bell Man (Herrick), choir, 2 bells, organ. 1954 (rev 1980)
- Three Songs of Love, (de la Mare, anonymous), SSA. 1951
- Three Songs of Death (Davenant, Herrick), SATB. 1954
- Cento 'Cantata Urbana' (Grier), 12 speakers (SATB), tape. 1967. BMIC 1968.

Voice

- Six Songs from Na Conxy Pan (Sándor Weöres), baritone, piano. 1941-7 (English version 1984)
- Psalm XIX 'A Benediction' (A.M. Klein), baritone, piano. 1951
- Journey of the Magi (Eliot), baritone, piano. 1952
- Comments (Montreal Star clippings), alto, piano trio. 1954
- Chansons d'aurore (A. Verdet), soprano, flute, piano. 1955
- A Wedding Carol (Anhalt), soprano, organ. 1985
- A Little Wedding Music (Hopkins), soprano, organ. 1984, Ber 1985
- Thisness, "a duo-drama" (Anhalt), mezzo, piano. 1986 (Vancouver 1986)
- The Squirrel (E. Barnett), voice, piano. 2002

== Writings ==
- "The making of Cento". Canada Music Book (1). Spring–Summer 1970.
- "About Foci". Artscanada. 28. April–May 1971.
- "La musique électronique; L'histoire de Cento". Musiques du Kébèk. Éditions du Jour. 1971. Raoul Duguay, editor.
- "Luciano Berio's Sequenza III". Canada Music Book (7). Autumn–Winter 1973.
- "About one's place and voice". Identities: The Impact of Ethnicity on Canadian Society. Toronto. 1977. Wsevolod W. Isajiv, editor.
- "Winthrop: the work, the theme, the story" (PDF). Canadian University Music Review. 4. 1983.
- Alternative Voices: Essays on Contemporary Vocal and Choral Composition. University of Toronto Press. 1984.
- "What tack to take? An autobiographical sketch (life in progress ... )". Queen's Quarterly. 92. Spring 1985.
- "Pst...pst...are you listening? Hearing voices from yesterday". Queen's Quarterly. 93. Spring 1986.
- "Music: context, text, counter-text". Contemporary Music Review. 5 (1). 1989.
- "Text, context, music" (PDF). Canadian University Music Review. 9 (2). 1989.
- "Thisness: marks and remarks". Musical Canada: Words and Music Honouring Helmut Kallmann. University of Toronto Press. 1988. John Beckwith, Frederick A. Hall, editors.
- Oppenheimer (opera), 1990, play only, not music.
- Record and book reviews in Canadian Music Journal (1957–61), including a review of Varèse recordings, Winter 1961.

== Sources ==
- Gillmor, Alan M., ed. Eagle Minds: Selected Correspondence of Istvan Anhalt and George Rochberg (1961–2005)
- Elliott, Robin, Gordon E. Smith. Istvan Anhalt: Pathways and Memory
- Sallis, Friedemann. "Eagle Minds: Selected Correspondence of Istvan Anhalt and George Rochberg, 1961-2005 [review]." University of Toronto Quarterly 79, no. 1 (2010): 471-473.
- Applebaum, Louis, Udo Kasemets. “Istvan Anhalt”
- Gesing, Renka. “Istvan Anhalt: Profile 3”
