= Hugh Davidson (composer) =

Canadian composer, music critic, radio producer, writer and arts administrator

Hugh Hanson Davidson (27 May 1930 in Montreal – 14 July 2014 in Victoria) was a Canadian composer, music critic, radio producer, writer, and arts administrator. His compositional output includes works for piano, ballets, chamber music, vocal art songs, choral works, and incidental music for the theatre.

Davidson graduated from The Royal Conservatory of Music where he studied from 1945 to 1948. His teachers there included George Crum in piano and Godfrey Ridout in music composition. In 1951, he went to England to pursue further studies in composition with Bernard Stevens and Humphrey Searle. After four years, he returned to Canada where he worked as a composer and studied orchestration with Neil Chotem in Montreal.

From 1956 to 1961 Davidson was a radio producer for CBC Montreal's English network, moving to their French network in 1962 where he worked for three years as a supervisor of music. He was then appointed assistant program director at CBC Montreal in 1965, a position he held for four years. In 1966 he helped found the Quebec Contemporary Music Society. In 1967 he worked for the Canadian Pavilion at Expo 67 as their music consultant. He worked for the BBC in London from 1969 to 1971 and then returned to Canada to become music administrator of the National Arts Centre (1971–1973). He was appointed head of music at the Canada Council in 1973, where he remained until he became cultural councillor to the Canadian High Commission in London in 1978. From 1981 to 1988 he served as general manager of the Canada Council's Touring Office. After leaving there he worked as a consultant to various arts organizations in the Vancouver area.

Davidson worked as a music critic for the British magazine Music and Musicians and for several publications in Montreal including The Gazette and Montréal-Matin. He also wrote program notes for numerous ensembles, including the Montreal Symphony Orchestra, the National Arts Centre Orchestra, and the Pro Musica Society of Montreal. From 1956 to 1960, he was the assistant editor of the Jeunesses musicales du Canada's music journal.

Davidson retired to Victoria, BC, in 1999, where he served, until his death, as a supporter and advisor to the Victoria Symphony.

He is a founder of Hugh Davidson Fund, which is currently administered by the Victoria Foundation. In 2018, Vancouver Symphony Orchestra, under the baton of Bramwell Tovey had performed some of his works, along with the violinist Rachel Barton Pine.
