= PlayMe =

- Genre: Audio drama
- Language: English

Cast and voices
- Hosted by: Chris Tolley; Laura Mullin

Technical specifications
- Audio format: MP3

Publication
- Original release: 2016
- Provider: CBC Podcasts

PlayMe is a Canadian original audio drama program and theatre podcast produced by the digital division of the Canadian Broadcasting Corporation (CBC). It is hosted and produced by Chris Tolley and Laura Mullin, who are artistic directors of Expect Theatre.

The program produces audio adaptations of recent Canadian stage dramas. It is broadcast as a podcast on CBC Radio 1 and SiriusXM Satellite. The podcast has been downloaded in more than ninety countries.

== History ==
It was started as an independent program in 2016 by Chris Tolley and Laura Mullin to extend theatre's reach.

In late 2018, it was licensed with Canadian Broadcasting Corporation (CBC) and later it has been distributed as a CBC Podcast, increasing its reach.

During the COVID-19 pandemic, when all the theaters were closed down, the popularity of the program increased.

The series was first broadcast in as a regular program in the fall of 2021 on CBC Radio 1 as part of its Sunday night lineup of narrative radio programs.

== Awards ==
- Webby Honoree by the International Academy of Arts and Sciences
- Gold Medal for Audio Drama at the 2020 New York Festival's Radio Award
