= Gilles Tremblay (composer) =

Canadian composer

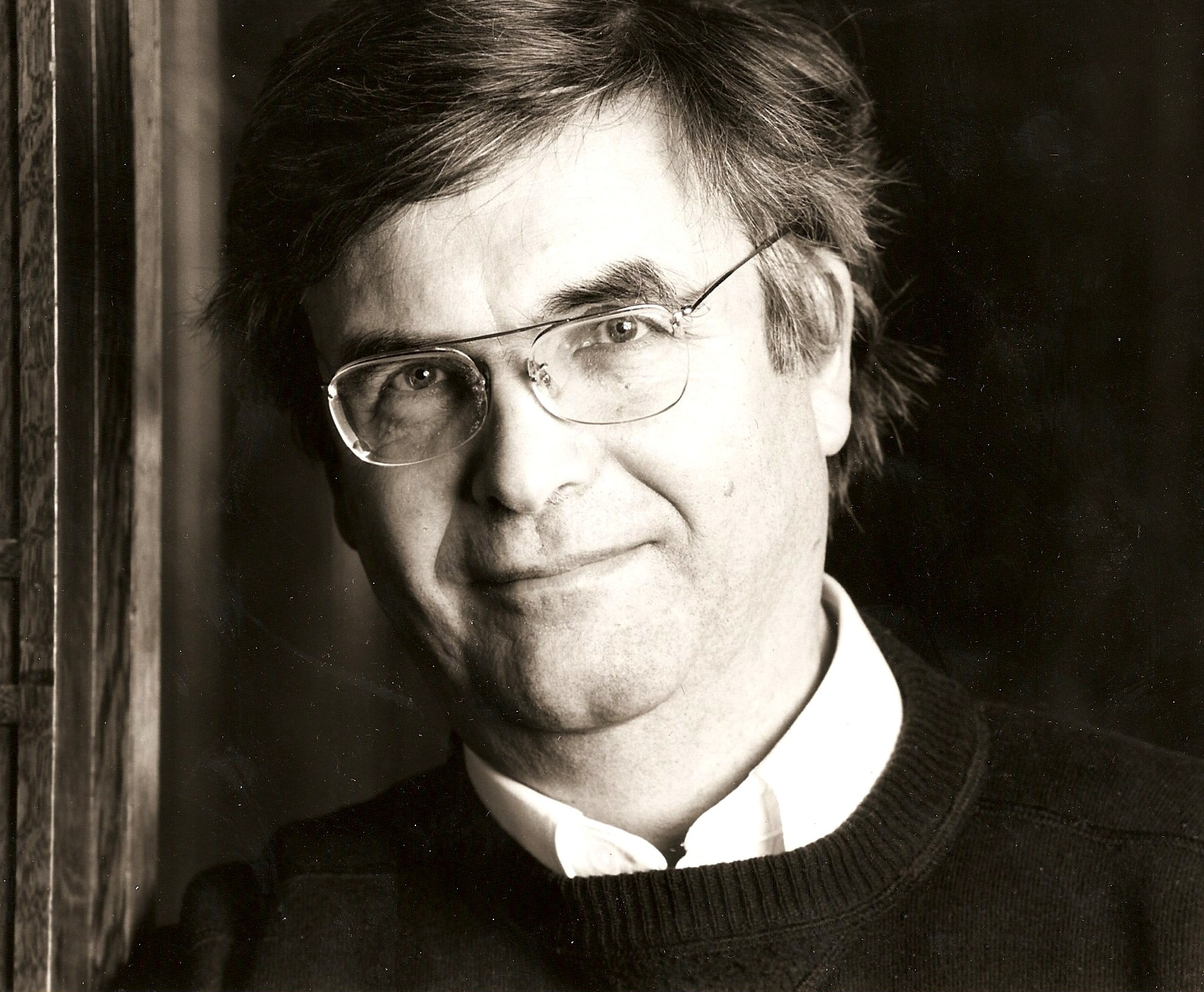
- Born: September 6, 1932; Arvida, Quebec, Canada
- Died: July 27, 2017 (aged 84); Montreal, Quebec, Canada
- Occupations: Composer, teacher

Gilles Tremblay, OQ CM (September 6, 1932 – July 27, 2017) was a Canadian composer and music teacher.

== Early life and education ==
Born in Arvida, Quebec, Tremblay studied at the Conservatoire de musique du Québec à Montréal and the Conservatoire de Paris (1954–61), where his teachers included Olivier Messiaen (analysis), Andrée Vaurabourg (counterpoint), Yvonne Loriod (piano), and Maurice Martenot. He also attended Karlheinz Stockhausen's courses at the Darmstädter Ferienkurse, where he became interested in electroacoustic music.

== Career ==
Tremblay returned to Quebec in 1961. He taught musical analysis at the Centre d'arts Orford and at the Conservatoire de musique du Québec à Québec. Beginning in 1962, and for many years thereafter, he taught composition at the Conservatoire de musique du Québec à Montréal. Among his pupils were Serge Arcuri, Raynald Arseneault, Yves Daoust, François Dompierre, Marc Hyland, Ramon Lazkano, Robin Minard, Éric Morin, Silvio Palmieri, Micheline Coulombe Saint-Marcoux, Isabelle Panneton, André Villeneuve, Claude Vivier, and Wolf Edwards.

Early in his career he performed as a specialist on the ondes Martenot.

A central figure in Quebec's contemporary classical music scene, Tremblay was active in many capacities including as president and artistic director of the Société de musique contemporaine du Québec. He was the recipient of many honours, including the Denise-Pelletier award and Officer of the National Order of Quebec (1991). In 2012, he was named to the Order of Canada.

In 1983, a six-record set of Tremblay's music was included in the Anthology of Canadian Music series. The Tremblay portrait in the Canadian Composers Portraits series was released in 2003.

Tremblay died on July 27, 2017, in Côte-des-Neiges–Notre-Dame-de-Grâce, Montréal.

== Compositions (selected) ==
- Mobile, for violin and piano (1962)
- Champs I, for piano and 2 percussionists (1965)
- Cantique de durées, for seven groups of instruments (1960)
- Sonorisation du Pavillon du Québec, 24-channel electronic music (1967)
- Souffles (Champs II), for 2 flutes, oboe, clarinet, horn, 2 trumpets, 2 trombones, piano, 2 percussionists, and contrabass (1968)
- Vers (Champs III), for 2 flutes, clarinet, trumpet, horn, 3 percussionists, 3 violins, and contrabass (1969)
- Jeux de solstices, for orchestra (1974)
- Oralléluiants, for soprano, bass clarinet, horn, 2 percussionists, and 3 contrabasses (1975)
- Fleuves, for piano, percussion, and orchestra (1976)
- Vers le soleil, for orchestra (1978)
- Le Signe du lion, for horn and tam-tam (1981)
- Triojubilus "À Raphaël", for flute, harp, and cowbells (1985)
- Les Vêpres de la Vierge, for soprano and orchestra (1986)
- Musique du feu, for piano and orchestra (1991)
- L'arbre de Borobudur, for horn, 2 harps, double bass, ondes Martenot, 2 percussionists, and gamelan ensemble (1994)
- L'espace du coeur (Miron-Machaut), for mixed voices and percussion (1997)
- Les pierres crieront, for cello and large orchestra (1998)
- A quelle heure commence le temps?, for baritone, percussion, piano, and orchestra (1999)
- L'appel de Kondiaronk: symphonie portuaire, environmental work for battle sirens and 2 locomotives (2000)
- String Quartet 'Croissant' (2001)
- En partage (Concerto), for viola and orchestra (2002)
- L'eau qui danse, la pomme qui chante et l'oiseau qui dit la vérité, Opéra féerie based on "The Dancing Water, the Singing Apple, and the Speaking Bird" (2009)

== Writings ==
- 1968. "Note pour Cantique de durées." Revue d'esthetique 21, nos. 2–4 ("Musiques nouvelles"): 51–58.
- 1994. "Gilles Tremblay : réflexions". Circuit, musiques contemporaines. 5 (1).
