= Quebec Contemporary Music Society =

Contemporary classical-music organization based in Montreal, Quebec

The Quebec Contemporary Music Society, or Société de musique contemporaine du Québec in French (SMCQ), is a contemporary classical-music organization based in Montreal, Quebec. It was founded in 1966 by Montreal composers and musicians, including Wilfrid Pelletier, Jean Papineau-Couture, Hugh Davidson, Serge Garant, and Maryvonne Kendergian.

The SMCQ presents an annual series of concerts involving its own ensemble as well as invited guests, the biennial Montreal/New Music International Festival, and a youth program called SMCQ Jeunesse (SMCQ Youth). The Homage Series, inaugurated in the 2007-08 season, is a biennial collaborative event that features the music of a major Quebec composer, which that season was Claude Vivier.

== Artistic Directors ==
- 1966-1986 : Serge Garant
- 1986-1988 : Gilles Tremblay
- 1988-2022 : Walter Boudreau
- 2022- : Ana Sokolović

== Montreal/New Music International Festival ==
The first Montreal/New Music International Festival was produced in 2005 and featured the music of more than 50 composers, including Cornelis de Bondt, R. Murray Schafer, and Michel Longtin. It included performances by the Hilliard Ensemble, Klangforum Wein and the Montreal Symphony Orchestra. The format of the festival included a week of concerts, lectures, master classes, and public rehearsals with composers.
