= List of New Music America performances =

Music Festival

This is a partial list of performances presented under the umbrella of the New Music America festival held from 1979 to 1990, and a different city each year, compiled from Georges Dupuis' personal archives from travel to the 1984 to 1990 festivals, during the latter years, as a secretary to the New Music Alliance planning sessions.

== 1979 New Music/New York ==
David Van Tieghem, solo percussion-theater performance; The Kitchen, New York, NY

== 1981 San Francisco ==
New Music America Festival, San Francisco

May 19 to August 2
Brian Eno, "Music for Museums"; University Art Museum, Berkeley

June 1–13
Peter Richards, Wave Organ installation; Marina Breakwater at the St. Francis Yacht Club

June 1–30
Bill Fontana, Landscape Sculpture with Foghorns; East Wall of Pier 2 at Fort Mason

June 2–22
Chris Brown, Tom Nunn, Dick Dunlap, Bruce Fier, Instrument group exhibition; San Francisco Airport, North Terminal

June 4
Ben Azarm, "MEAL"; Embarcadero Center

June 4–6
Exhibit: Pacific Film Archive: Contemporary Film Scores and Graphic Sound Films; Intersection Theatre
Paul Fuchs and Limp, "Minimalist Directions"; Intersection Theatre

June 6
Presentation: Center for Computer Research in Music and Acoustics, "New Music from the Center for Computer Music", Stanford University
The Scientists, performance; Embarcadero Center

June 7
Paul Fuchs and Limpe: German Composers Paul Demarinis with Anne Kingensmith Songs Maggi Payne Electronics Performance Stuart Dempster Performance with didjiridu and tape Leo Smith Ensemble Performance: New Jazz Terry Allen Solo piano and Country Songs All at Intersection Theatre
Nicolas Collins: Installation: Water Works; Golden Gate Ferry Terminal
Liz Phillips: Sunspots; San Francisco Museum of Modern Art

June 8
Meetings of the New Music Alliance, Nigel Redden, Chair; Exploratorium
Daniel Schmidt: Sound Column Performance; Palace of Fine Arts Rotunda
Workshop: Computers in Composition and Performance, Exploratorium
Arch Ensemble: Works by Robert Erickson, Robert Hughes, Blue "Gene" Tyranny, Julius Eastman and Charles Amirkhanian; Japan Center Theater
The Residents: One Minute Movies with Graeme Whifler; Japan Center Theater
Phill Niblock: Evening of film and music; Cinematheque

June 9
New Music Alliance meetings, Mary MacArthur, Chair; Exploratorium
David Behrman, Bob Watts and Bob Diamond: Cloud Music; Fort Mason Conference Centre
Workshop: Instrument Design; 80 Langton Street
League of Automatic Music Composers: Computer Music Joe McPhee: Solo Saxophone Joseph Kubera: John Adams: Work for Solo Piano Peter Garland: Work for 2 violins and percussion Robert Ashley: Performance Japan Center Theater

June 9 - June 11
Sensurround performance: The first theater of sound for the performance of electronic music using 136 speakers, located all around the theater; Audium Theater of Sound Sculptured Space, 1616 Bush Street

June 10
New Music Alliance meetings, Robert Stearns, Chair: Election and discussion of goals and aims; Exploratorium
Ingram Marshall: Poor People's Music; Palace of Fine Arts Rotunda
Meet the Composer: California Organizational Meeting; Exploratorium
Laurie Spiegel: Video and Acoustic Music Davey Williams with LaDonna Smith: Improvisation Jim Pomeroy: Performance Peter Gena: Work for 2 pianos and electric bass George E. Lewis Ensemble: Work for 4 trombones; Japan Center Theater

June 11
Panel: New Music America; Robin Kirk, Chair: Funder's Panel; Exploratorium
Workshop: Improvisation Paul Dresher: Electronics Diamanda Galás: Extended Vocal Performance Ned Sublette: Cowboy Songs Nancy Karp and Dancers; Terry Riley: Vocal performance; Exploratorium

June 12
Ralph Jones: Rotunda Sounding; Palace of Fine Arts Rotunda
Pauline Oliveros: Travelling Companions; Marx Meadow, Golden Gate Park
Workshop: Publishing and Distribution Exploratorium
Herman LeRoux and the Veil of Isis: New Music from the San Francisco Conservatory; Hearst Court, De Young Museum
Margaret Fisher Performance; Conlon Nancarrow: Player Piano; Ustad Ali Akbar Khan; Performance; Japan Center Theater Keith Terry: Jazz Tap Percussion Ensemble, Performance Gallery
Douglas Hollis: Fire Watercycle (celebration/performance/installation); Palace of Fine Arts Rotunda
Other Music: Gamelan late night performance; Complex, 535 Stevenson St.

June 13
Conlon Nancarrow: Workshop on player pianos; Exploratorium
Pauline Oliveros:Travelling Companions; Marx Meadow, Golden Gate Park
Bonnie Barnett: Tunnel Hum; Pedestrian tunnel, Great Highway at the Beach end of Judah St.
Laurie Anderson: Performance for mixed media Japan Center Theater
Buster Simpson: Installation; San Francisco Art Institute

June 14
Karlton Hester Ensemble & Dancers: Performance; Old First Church Center for the Arts

== 1984 Hartford ==
New Music America Festival, Hartford Connecticut

July 1
Amtrak New Music America Express: Train performance Charlie Morrow's Conch Orchestra Brian Johnson: Sound Work for train Joseph Celli Performance for train; New York Grand Central Station to Hartford, Connecticut Station
Mega March: Train station performance; Hartford Terminal
Salon des refusés: Various Musicians Pauline Oliveros performance Body Musicians: Performance; Mad Murphy's
The Sun Ra Akestra; Mad Murphy's

July 2
New Music Alliance meetings; University of Hartford
Rick Rozie & Mixashawn Arto Lindsay and the Ambitious Lovers; Old State House
David Weinstein: Installation Group Exposition: Scribing Sound Open Mike Performance; Hartford Arts Centre

July 3
New Music Alliance Meetings; University of Hartford
Peace Train's All Star Breakers & Poppers with Circulation Eugene Chadborne and Shockabilly; Old State House
Ron Kuivila: Installation; Hartford Arts Centre
James Fulkerson and Neely Bruce: Play Stephen Montague and others; Wadsworth Atheneum
David Moss: Intimate Solos; Wadsworth Connecticut Room for the David Bermant Collection
Jim Pomeroy: performance Chris Brown, William Winant and Jon English: trio performance Muhal Richard Adams: performance Relâche: Play Malcolm Goldstein and others; Wadsworth Auditorium

July 4
New Music Alliance Meetings; University of Hartford
Sam Rivers Saxophone Ensemble: Performance; Old State House
Skip Laplante: Workshop; Constitution Plaza
Yura Adams: Performance David Mahler: Performance, Marina Lapalma: Performance IXNA: Performance, Frankie Mann: Performance; Center Church
Gerald F. Errante, Robert Black, Robert Dick: Virtuoso Series; Wadsworth Auditorium
Hartford Symphony Orchestra: Play James Sellars, Yvar Mikhashoff, Charles Ives Fourth of July Outdoor Concert at Old State House
Jim Pomeroy: Texas Barbecue; The Russian Lady 1

July 5
New Music Alliance Meetings; University of Hartford
Liquid Liquid Olu Dara and the Okra Orchestra; Old State House
Ellen Fullman: Long Stringed Instrument; Travelers Court Hall
Visual Sound Forum: Installations and Talks Leif Brush, Alvin Lucier, Liz Phillips, William Hellerman, Jim Pomeroy; Phill Niblock Ruth Miller, Steve Parrish Hartford Arts Centre
Jon English; Yvar Mikhashoff; Virtuoso Series; Wadsworth Atheneum
Frances-Marie Uitti, David Mott, Gary Karr: Interpretations of John Cage works; Wadsworth Atheneum
Stuart Smit: Performance, Helen Thorington and Partners: Performance, John Zorn, Fred Frith, Christian Marclay, David Moss, Wayne Horvitz, Robin Holcomb Performance of John Zorn's Rugby; Wadsworth Auditorium
James Tenney: Spectral Canon for Conlon Nancarrow, Bridges for four micro-tuned pianos; Lincoln Center

July 6
New Music Alliance Meetings; University of Hartford
David Betts Garland, Bob Gatzen and Spiral; Old State House
Russell Frehling: Installation; Hartford Civic Center
Workshop: Various Service Organizations; Hartford Arts Center
John Driscoll: Installation; Hartford Arts Center
Ursula Oppens: Plays Alvin Curran, Elliott Carter, David, Charles Wuorinen, Frederic Rzewski; Lincoln Theatre
Jerry Hunt: Performance, Frances-Marie Uitti: Performance, Michael Pugliese: Performance, S.E.M. Ensemble: Performance, Joseph Jarman: Performance; Lincoln Theatre

July 7
David Hykes and the Harmonic Choir: Vocal Performance, William Albright and Celli; New Music for Pipe Organ, William Albright plays Morton Feldman Amina Claudine Myers and her Voice Orchestra: Performance, Glenn Branca Ensemble: Symphony no. 3; Cathedral of St. Joseph
Beth Griffin: Morton Feldman's "Voices"; Cathedral of St. Joseph
Earl Howard: Performance, Terry Riley and Krishna Bhatt: Duo Improvisation, Wadada Leo Smith: Performance, Terry Riley and the New Music All Stars: "In C"; Lincoln Theatre

== 1985 Los Angeles ==
October 31
Opening Celebration Gala; Los Angeles City Hall
Los Angeles Philharmonic, Play Robert Erickson, Dane Rudhyar, John Adams, Ursula Oppens, piano; Dorothy Chandler Pavilion

November 1
Bonnie Barnett: "Auto Hum" live radio broadcast; KPFK Studio Z
Michael Galasso, Art Works; Moca's Temporary Contemporary, 152 North Central Avenue
Repercussion Unit: Performance, Johanna Went: Performance, Richard Zvonar: Performance, Kraig Grady and Barefoot Performance and film; Los Angeles County Museum of Art
Gordon Monahan: "Speakers Swinging" with John Oswald and Holly Small; Park Plaza Hotel

November 2
Harold Budd, Art works and recordings, The Residents, Art works; Los Angeles Contemporary Exhibitions (LACE)
Kronos Quartet: Morton Feldman "String Quartet No. 2"; Los Angeles County Museum of Art
Stephen Scott Ensemble, Performance, James Newton, Performance, Lois V Vierk, Performance, Paul Demarinis, Performance, Earl Howard, Performance; Cal Arts Modular Theatre

November 3
La Monte Young, "The Well-Tuned Piano"; full five-hour broadcast including interview with the composer; KPFK Radio The California EAR Unit: Play Otto, Stephen Mosko, Jim Staley, Joan La Barbara; Los Angeles County Museum of Art
Sussan Deiheim and Richard Horowitz: Performance; Los Angeles Theatre Centre

November 4
New Music Alliance, Meetings; Park Plaza Hotel
David Burge: Performance; Arnold Schonberg Institute
Los Angeles Philharmonic New Music Group play Ingram Marshall, Ivan Tcherepnin, Ornette Coleman, Bud Powell, L. Subramaniam and Steiger, Los Angeles Philharmonic New Music Group with Aki Takahashi and Stephen L. Mosko: Performance Japan America Theatre

November 5
New Music Alliance, Meetings; Park Plaza Hotel
Tom Marioni, Gary Lloyd, Bill and Mary Buchen, Betty Freeman: Art works: "Player Pianos to Pinball": sound installations; Otis Parsons Gallery
Bertram Turetzky Plays Noel Estrada, Christian Wolff, Childs, Ornette Coleman, Jon Deak and Bertram Turetzky; Arnold Schonberg Institute
Morton Subotnick: Performance, The California EAR Unit: Performance, Daniel Lentz: Performance, The Fibonaccis: Performance, John Carter Quintet: Performance, Christian Marclay: Performance, Tom Recchion: Performance; Japan America Theater

November 6
New Music Alliance, Meetings; Park Plaza Hotel
David Ocker: Performance; Arnold Schonberg Institute

November 6 and 7
Scott Johnson and ensemble: "Alibis", "Before Winter"; Japan America Theatre

November 7
New Music Alliance, Meetings; Park Plaza Hotel
Jim Pomeroy with Eugene Chadborne: "Composer's Cookout"; Park Plaza?
Liz Phillips: Cymbal Installation; Los Angeles Theatre Center Lobby
William Winant plays Jim Pomeroy, Larry Polansky, Gordon Mumma, James Tenney, Michael Jon Fink, Chris Brown, Michael Byron; Arnold Schonberg Institute

November 8
New Music Alliance, Meetings; Park Plaza Hotel
Joseph Celli: "Velvet Squares and Pershing Kings"; Pershing Square
Carla Bley with Jack Bruce, Don Preston and Steve Swallow: "For Under the Volcano"
Paul Dresher, Rinde Eckert: "Tropic of Entropy", Philip Glass: "The Photographer"(excerpt) with Kelsey Grammer; Mark Taper Forum "When New Wave Was New"; performances and exhibits; Al's Bar

November 9
Seamus: New electronic (or electroacoustic) compositions; open listening sessions
Bay Area New Gamelan: Performance, John King: "Africa Songs", Spencer Barefield: Performance, Jocy De Oliviera: Performance, Neil B. Rolnick: Performance, David Rosenboom: Performance, Robert Suderberg: "Freeway Concerto" for performers and automobiles, Horace Tapscott: Solo piano performance, Michael Byron: "Entrances", Bun Ching Lam: "After Spring", Jim Fox: "Black Water", Polkacide: Performance in the Main Gallery;
California Institute of the Arts, Valencia, California
Three Day Stubble: Performance, Debt of Nature: Performance; California Institute of the Arts Cafeteria, Valencia, California

November 10
David Moss: Intimate Solos (for audiences of 8 or less); California Institute of the Arts, Valencia, California
David Rosenboom: Performance, Laura Karpman: "Stanzas for Music", Arthur Jarvinen: "Electric Jesus", Alvin Curran: "Sonic Geography", World Saxophone Quartet: Performance, Charlie Haden Liberation Orchestra: Performance; California Institute of the Arts, Valencia, California

== Houston 1986 ==
April 5
Tom Cora and large ensembles and vehicles; New Music Parade; Montrose Blvd, Houston
John Cage: Ryoanji: Sound Sculpture Garden installation; Museum of Fine Arts
Camiata Soloists play Noon, Guy Klucevsek, Jon Deak, Strandberg, Newman, Ornette Coleman; Brown Auditorium Joan La Barbara: "ROTHKO; Rothko Chapel
Jean Michel Jarre; "Rendez-vous Houston" Houston Festival, Texas Sesquicentennial and NASA Tribute to the Space Shuttle Challenger; Downtown Houston including projections on matted skyscrapers best viewable from Sam Houston Park.

April 6
Ornette Coleman "Ornette: Made in America", world premiere film with Coleman present; unknown movie after midnight, Urban Glut: Performance, Art Gottschalk: Performance, James Sellars: Performance, David Garland: Performance, Julie Lyonn Lieberman: Performance, Tom McVeety: Performance; City Hall Stage, Tranquility Tent
"Scribing Sounds 2": Sound Installations, Stelarc Installation and performance, Annea Lockwood Sound installation, Lanny Steele: Performance; City Hall Stage

April 6–7
R.I.P. Hayman: Dreamsounds: An overnight sleepover performance; Holiday Inn

April 7
New Music Alliance, Meetings; Holiday Inn
String Trio of New York: Performance; Tenneco Plaza
New Culture Quartet of Sweden: "Ship of Fools", Susan Rawcliffe: Performance, Janice Misurell Mitchell: Performance; Downtown Houston
Jim Pomeroy: Performance, David Rosenboom: Performance, Cimarron Wind Quintet: Performance, Guy Klucevsek plays Lois V Vierk; Denney Theatre
New Music Open Mike - Various Artists; Salon de Refusé, Magnolia Room

April 8
New Music Alliance, Meetings; Holiday Inn
Olu Dara and the Okra Orchestra: Performance; First City Tower South Plaza
Electric Sky: play Karl Korte, Mowitz, Schottstaedt, Chafe, De Oliviera, Morton Subotnick; Burke Baker Planetarium
Robert Dick plays Petr Kotik, Robert Dick, Tibor Szemző, John Adams, McTee; unknown venue
"From Lubbock to Berlin", Marianne Schroeder: Performance, Lyric Art Quintet play Robert Kraft, Steve Paxton Group: Performance, Masciunas Ensemble: "Rodeo"; University of Houston

April 9
New Music Alliance, Meetings; Holiday Inn
Composer-Performers take over the Houston Astrodome (at 9:00 a.m.)
Jane Ira Bloom: Performance, Richard Lehrman: Performance, Russell Frehling: Performance incorporating radio glider with microphone; Houston Astrodome
Jon Rose: 18-hour solo performance including interaction with television activated by foot pedal; main lobby of the Republic Bank.
Leroy Jenkins Mixed Quartet: Performance; 1600 Smith St Bldg
Jerry Hunt: Performance, Pat Oleszko: Performance, Jim Pomeroy: Performance, Bonnie Shrek: Performance; Unknown venue
Robert Rodriguez: Performance, Tina Marsh: Performance, Urban-15 Media Arts Group: Theatre; Houston Comm College, Heinen Theatre
New Music Open Mike - Various Artists; Salon de Refusé, Magnolia Room

April 10
New Music Alliance, Meetings; Holiday Inn
John Carter Quintet: Performance; Lyric Office Center Outdoor Stage
Ellen Fullman: "Long Stringed Instrument"; Installation and demonstration performance, Doug Hollis: Performance; unknown venue
Connie Beckley: Performance; University of Houston Lawndale
New Music Open Mike - Various Artists; Salon de Refusé, Magnolia Room

April 11
New Music Alliance, Meetings; Holiday Inn
Bonnie Barnett: "Tunnel Hum"; Downtown Houston Tunnel System, The McLean Mix, David Behrman, David Weinstein: "Tunnel Hum"; 1600 Smith Bldg lobby
Larry Kucharz: Performance, Reynold Weidenaar and Jane Ira Bloom: Duo performance, Larry Austin: Performance, Myrna Schloss: Performance, Bill Seaman: Performance, Janis Crystal Lipzin: Performance; Rice Media Centre
Steve Reich, "Different Trains"; unknown venue
Ned Sublette; Performance, Brave Combo: Performance; unknown venue

April 12
Kiva: Performance, Jack Massing: Performance, Eleanor Hovda: Performance, Michael Waisvisz: Performance; unknown venue
Ned Sublette Band with Blue "Gene" Tyranny; Sam Houston Park
Culturcide: Performance, Sonic Youth: Performance, Brave Combo: Performance; Houston Town Square Stage

== Philadelphia 1987 ==
October 2
Relâche (musical group) with Stephen Montague play John Cage, Stephen Montague, Ed Fulkerson, Rolf Gehlhaar, Odaline de la Martinez
Odeon Pope Saxophone Choir: Performance; Port of History Museum

October 3
Good Sound Foundation: Workshop ; Port of History Museum
Alvin Curran: "The Maritime Rites; Penn's Landing
George Russell and the Living Time Orchestra: "The African Game"
Relâche play Martin Duckworth and Aaron Kernis; Port of History Auditorium
Centenary of Marcel Duchamp: Exhibit and lecture; Philadelphia Museum of Art
Temple University Orchestra: play Henry Cowell, Melinda Wagner and Alvin Lucier; Port of History Auditorium
Michael Nyman: "The Man Who Mistook His Wife for a Hat"; WHYY Forum Theatre

October 4
New Music Alliance, Meetings; Quality Inn
Margaret Leng-Tan plays Somei Satoh, Ichiyanagi, Matsudaira, Yin, Gan-Ru; Philadelphia Ethical Society
Herbert Blau, Roger Oliver and Don Shewey: Panel: Lecture "New Music and Theatre"; Philadelphia College of the Arts
Richard Horowitz and Sussan Deiheim: Performance, Thomas Albert: Performance, Linda Montano: "Casio Portraits"; Painted Bride Art Gallery
Penn Contemporary Players: Performance, Borah Bergman: Performance, Wayne Horvitz and Bobby Previte: Performance, Rudin and Relâche: Performance; Port of History Auditorium 1

October 6
New Music Alliance, Meetings; Quality Inn
Relâche with Barbara Noska play Paul Epstein, Toby Olson and Michael Winkler; Temple University, Center City
"Talking Music" Panel; various speakers; Temple University, Center City
Jim Meneses and Kixx: Performance, Tina Davidson: Performance, Marshall Taylor: Performance, Société de musique contemporaine du Québec play Michel Longtin, Gilles Tremblay, Claude Vivier, John Rea, Elliott Sharp Ensemble: Performance, Glen Velez: Performance, Relâche with Romulus Franceschini: Performance Port of History Auditorium

October 7
New Music Alliance, Meetings; Quality Inn
Robert Ashley: Performance, Peter Zummo Ensemble: Performance, Fast Forward: Performance; Painted Bride Art Gallery
Maggi Payne and Ed Tannenbaum: Performance; Port of History Auditorium
Marcelle Deschênes: Performance, Alain Thibault: Performance, Peter Rose: Performance, Guy Klucevsek: "Polka from the Fringe": unidentified packed bar

October 8
New Music Alliance, Meetings; Quality Inn
Relâche with Bob Goldberg: "Music for Subways"; Broad Street Subway Concourse
Shelley Hirsch: Performance, Anthony Coleman: Performance, Lenny Seidman: Performance; Painted Bride
Joel Chadabe: Performance, Ron Kuivila: Performance, Salvatore Martirano: Performance, Richard Teitelbaum: Performance, Laurie Spiegel: Performance; Port of History Auditorium

October 9
New Music Alliance, Meetings; Quality Inn
Leif Brush: Performance: "Connecting Surface Waves: The Roadside Broadcasts", Fairmount Park
Joseph Kasinskas: Performance, Susan Stegner: Performance, Mary Jane Leach: Performance, Warren Burt: Performance for tuning forks; Memorial Hall
Stewart Dempster: David Mahler "Fantasy on America"; Gymnasium, Fairmount Park
Relâche: Performance, Rova Saxophone Quartet: Performance, Bruce Mather: Performance, Roger Reynolds: Performance; Port of History Museum Auditorium
Relâche with Daniel Goode and Frederic Rzewski: Gala closing performance; Port of History Auditorium

== Miami 1988 ==
December 2
December 2 - until Miami Metro Police took it down - Gordon Monahan: installation, "Hey Baby Do You Want To Take A Ride In My Car?", Metro Transit Rail system.
New World Symphony with Michael Tilson Thomas play Charles Wuorinen, Elliott Carter, Morton Feldman, Astor Piazzolla, Steve Reich; Gusman Center for the Performing Arts

December 3
Pat Oleszko: Performance, Del Pueblo Del Barrio: Performance, Perujazz: Performance, Uakti: Performance, Kronos Quartet play Wayne Horvitz, Philip Glass; Terry Riley, John Zorn, Astor Piazzolla, Julius Hemphill, Drums of Fire: Performance; Sovereign of the Seas

December 4
Carolee Schneemann Malcolm Goldstein; Performance, Marilyn Gottleib-Roberts: Performance; Wolfson Theatre
Horst Rickels and Shelley Hirsch: Performance voice and device, Ken Butler: performance and demonstration of multiple guitars, Uakti presents the works and instruments of Anton Walter Smetak; Barbara Gillman Gallery
Ken Gray: Installation; Government Centre Atrium
Kronos Quartet play Kevin Volans, Morton Feldman, Eleanor Hovda, Steve Reich; Blum, Vigeland and Williams: Morton Feldman: Crippled Symmetry First Presbyterian Church

December 5
New Music Alliance: organizational meetings; Hotel Clevelander
Charles Austin, Joe Gallivan: performance, Rodolfo Caesar: performance, Michael Peppe: performance, Dennis Kam: performance; Center for the Fine Arts

December 5–9
Critics Conference Panelists: Tom Moon, George Cisneros, Juan Orrego-Salas, Joe Celli, William Littler, Linda Faye Durham, Anthony Davis, Tim Page, Sally Barnes, Tony Conrad, Jon Pareles, Alan Arch, Joe McLellan, Alvin Lucier, Antonio Hernandez, Mary Luft, Francisco Kropfl, John Rockwell, Gordon Monahan, Robert Ashley, Mark Swed, Kyle Gann, Paul Dresher, Scott Johnson, Michael Anthony, Charles Wuorinen, Andrew Porter, Janet Chasmir.

December 6
New Music Alliance: organizational meetings; Hotel Clevelander
Ricardo Dal Farra, Arturo Gervasoni play Roscoe Mitchell, Leon Biriotti, Yasuano Tone; Center for the Fine Arts
Mary Ellen Childs and Relàche: performance, John King and Robert Kovich: performance, Michael Pugliese plays John Cage; Gusman Center for the Performing Arts

December 7
New Music Alliance: organizational meetings; Hotel Clevelander
Marty Walker plays Cort Lippe, Miguel Salvador plays Graciela Paraskevaidis, Robert Black plays Jon Deak, Don Pullen and Jana Haimsohn: performance; Center for the Fine Arts
James Tenney: performance, David Van Tieghem: solo percussion-theater performance, Don Pullen: performance; Gusman Center for the Performing Arts

December 8
New Music Alliance: organizational meetings; Hotel Clevelander
Brian Johnson: Alvin Lucier: Silver Streetcar for the Orchestra
Lisa LaCross: plays Alicia Terzian, Joseph Celli: plays Jerry Hunt's Transphalba, Peter Rose and David Moss: performance; Center for the Fine Arts
New World Symphony: Orlando Garcia: Threnody for the Americas; Anthony Davis: MAPS; Lou Harrison: Third Symphony; Gusman Center for the Performing Arts

December 9
New Music Alliance: organizational meetings; Hotel Clevelander
Elizabeth Streb: dance and sound performance, Tony Conrad: performance, Morton Feldman memorial; Center for the Arts
Bill Frisell: performance, Gerry Hemingway: performance; Art Deco Club

December 10
Celso Garrida-Lecca: performance, Jim Staley and Bill Frisell; performance, Ikue Mori: performance, Christopher Yams-Hart: performance, Naná Vasconcelos: performance; Gusman Center for the Performing Arts, Gilberto Gil: performance, Sonny Okusun: performance; Cameo Theatre
Paul Dresher: performance; Gusman Center for the Performing Arts

== New York 1989 ==
November 8
Gala Opening at Brooklyn Academy of Music
Laurie Anderson: presentation, Allen Ginsberg: poem, Philip Glass: performance, Kronos Quartet: Excerpt from Steve Reich's 'Different Trains, Moondog: performance, Brand Nubians: performance, Bob Weir: presentation, Fran Leibowitz: presentation, Jevette Steele and Bob Telson: performance

November 9
Shelley Hirsch and Christian Marclay: performance; Roulette

November 10
Kip Hanrahan: Performance, David Lynch and Angelo Badalamenti: Industrial Symphony No. 1, Lester Bowie: performance; Brooklyn Academy of Music

November 11
Trimpin plays Conlon Nancarrow, Baldwin Showroom
Christian Marclay: Installation; New Museum
David Byrne and El Rei Momo with Margareth Menzes: performance; Brooklyn Academy of Music
Miniature: performance, No Safety: partial performance, Ned Sublette: interrupted performance; The World

November 12
Lincoln Center Performance: Harry Partch's "Revelations in Courthouse Park", featuring Partch's original instruments. Heiner Goebbels: The Man in the Elevator; The Kitchen, Power Tools with Ronald Shannon Jackson: Performance; Knitting Factory

November 13
New Music Alliance: Organizational meetings; Ritz Carlton Hotel
Nexus: Performance; Merkin Hall
Larry Kucharz: performance, George Lewis and Don Ritter: Performance, Mary Jane Leach: performance, Phill Niblock: performance; Experimental Intermedia

November 14
New Music Alliance: Organizational meetings; Ritz Carlton Hotel

November 14–18
Lawrence "Butch" Morris: Rehearsal/workshops; Whitney Museum
Ed Wilkerson and Shadow VIgnettes: performance, Fred Frith: performance, Ingram Marshall: performance; Brooklyn Academy of Music, Thomas Mapfumo: performance; Sounds of Brazil nightclub

November 15
New Music Alliance: Organizational meetings; Ritz Carlton Hotel
Daniel Goode: performance, Bill Hellermann: performance, Mary Jane Leach: performance, Anthony Coleman: performance; Merkin Hall
Nicolas Collins: performance, Ron Kuivila: performance, Joel Ryan and Ben Neill: performance, Peter Cusack and Ushio Torika: performance; Experimental Intermedia
Farafina Dance Ensemble: Performance; The World

November 16
New Music Alliance: Organizational meetings; Ritz Carlton Hotel
Brooklyn Philharmonic Orchestra: Performance; Brooklyn Academy of Music
Negativland: Performance; Knitting Factory Janitors Animated : CBGB

November 17
New Music Alliance: Organizational meetings; Ritz Carlton Hotel
Carl Stone Experience: Performance, Steinski and Friends: Performance, Rhythim is Rhythim: Performance; The Kitchen

November 18
New Music Alliance: Organizational meetings; Ritz Carlton Hotel
Tribute to Frederic Rzewski featuring Frederic Rzewski, Maryanne Amarcher, Sound Pressure, Zeitgeist, Carol Plantamura, Casey Sokol, Steven Ben Israel and Musica Elettronica Viva.
NIght of 1000 stars featuring the Butthole Surfers, the World Saxophone Quartet; the Ordinaires, Tiye Giraud, Aster Aweke, Moondog, Sussan Deiheim and Richard Horowitz; Brooklyn Academy of Music

== Montreal 1990 ==
October 31
Rhys Chatham with 101 electric guitars, "An Angel Moves Too Fast"; Metropolis Club

November 1
Various artists on tape: Acousmonium; Les Loges
Orchestre Metropolitain de Montreal play Michel Longtin, Claude Vivier, Linda Bouchard; Place des Arts
Ludi: Opéra médiatique, Le Spectrum
Loren Mazzacane: performance; Foufounes Electriques

November 2
Ken Butler: performance and instrument demonstration, Pierre St-Jak: performance, "Légende de la Pluie" (various artists), Mother Mallard and the American Theatre Group: performance, Le Spectrum, Brenda Hutchinson: performance, Bruire: performance; Foufounes Electriques

November 3
Hildergard Westerkamp and Choir; Concert des Clochers; Université du Québec à Montréal
Rokeby-Dimuzio-Don Ritter: performance, Gordon Monahan: performance; Maison de culture Frontenac
Scott Johnson Ensemble: performance, the President with Wayne Horvitz: performance; Le Spectrum
John King and Electric World: performance; Foufounes Electriques

November 4
Kronos Quartet play La Monte Young and the world premiere of "spectre" by John Oswald, Le Spectrum
André Deschênes et L: performance, Tone Dogs: performance; Foufounes Electriques

November 5
New Music Alliance Organizational meetings; Foufounes Electriques
Joseph Kubera: performance, CCMC: performance; Maison de Culture Frontenac
Challenge with Anthony Braxton: performance, Arraymusic: performance, le Spectrum, Fred Frith Guitar Quartet:performance, U-Totem: performance; Foufounes Electriques

November 6
New Music Alliance Organizational meetings; Foufounes Electriques
Nouvel Ensemble Moderne: performance, Sound Pressure: performance; Foufounes Electriques

November 7
New Music Alliance Organizational meetings; Foufounes Electriques
Linda Fisher: performance, Paul Plimley and Andrew Cyrille: performance; Maison de Culture Frontenac
Anthony Coleman's Klezmer: performance, René Lussier et Les Granules-15: performance; Le Spectrum, Jin Hi Kim: performance, Direct Sound: performance; Foufounes Electriques

November 8
New Music Alliance Organizational meetings; Foufounes Electriques
Pierre André Arcand: Keeklockeeeeee, ZGA: performance; Foufounes Electriques
Sylvain Côté et Jean Filion: performance, Test Department: performance; Le Spectrum
Les Pois z'ont rouges: performance, Tom Cora and Last Leg: performance; Foufounes Electriques

November 9
New Music Alliance Organizational meetings; Foufounes Electriques
Gaetan Leboeuf: performance; Bibliothèque Nationale
Claude Lamothe: performance, Alain Trudel: performance, Foufounes Electriques
The Residents: perform "Buckaroo Blues" and "The King and I", Le Spectrum
Leroy Jenkins and Sting: performance; Foufounes Electriques

November 10
Théâtre UBU: Samuel Beckett: "Cantate Grise"; Chappelle du Bon Pasteur
Lights in a Fat City: Foufounes Electriques
The Residents: Press Conference; Ritz Carlton

November 11
Margaret Leng-Tan: Performance
Biota/Mnemonists: Performance; Maison de Culture Frontenac
Einsturzende Neubaten with La la la Human Steps: performance; Le Spectrum
