= Eleanor Hovda =

American classical composer

Eleanor Hovda (March 27, 1940 – November 12, 2009) was a composer and dancer from the United States of America. She was born in Duluth, Minnesota and died in Springdale, Arkansas.

She received her Bachelor of Arts in music at American University in Washington, D.C., and her MFA in dance at Sarah Lawrence College. Her music has been performed extensively in the U.S. and abroad by ensembles including the Netherlands Wind Ensemble, KlangForum (Vienna), the Cassatt and Kronos Quartets, Zeitgeist, Bang on a Can All-Stars, the San Francisco Contemporary Music Players, the Boston Musica Viva, The California Ear Unit, the Minneapolis Guitar Quartet and the St. Louis Symphony. Performance venues have included Ozawa Hall (Tanglewood), Alice Tully, Carnegie Hall Weill, Miller, Walter Reade and Merkin Concert Halls; The Kitchen, Bang on a Can Festival and The Alternative Museum (NYC) the Purcell Room (London), The American Academy (Rome), the American Center (Paris), the WDR (Cologne), Cervantino Festival (Mexico), New Music Forum (Mexico City), Holland Festival (Amsterdam), Vienna, Madrid, Barcelona, Tokyo and Asahikawa (Japan); colleges and universities including Princeton, Harvard, Yale, Columbia, and Swarthmore; The Walker Art Center (Minneapolis), and New Music America. Remote, a collaboration with Baryshnikov's White Oak Dance Project, toured nationally and made its NYC premiere at the Brooklyn Academy of Music in 1997.

Hovda held appointments as full professor/composer-in-residence on the music faculties of Princeton and Yale universities, and Bard College. Music and dance appointments include residencies at Sarah Lawrence College, Wesleyan University, the College of St. Scholastica and the American Dance Festival.

Her music has been recorded by the ensemble Relâche. Two CDs devoted exclusively to her compositions have been released on OO Discs: Coastal Traces and Ariadne Music. In early 2012, Innova released the four-CD set, "The Eleanor Hovda Collection," comprising "Ariadne Music," "Coastal Traces," "Sound Around The Sound," and "Excavations." One of her works, "Cymbalmusic Series #4", was also recorded on the New Zealand label Rattle Records.
