= Relâche =

Relâche is French for "cancellation", "theater dark", or "no performance today". It may refer to:

- Relâche (ballet), a 1924 ballet by Francis Picabia with music by Erik Satie
- Relâche (musical group), an American contemporary classical music ensemble from Philadelphia, Pennsylvania
