= Anne Lauber =

Canadian composer, conductor and music educator

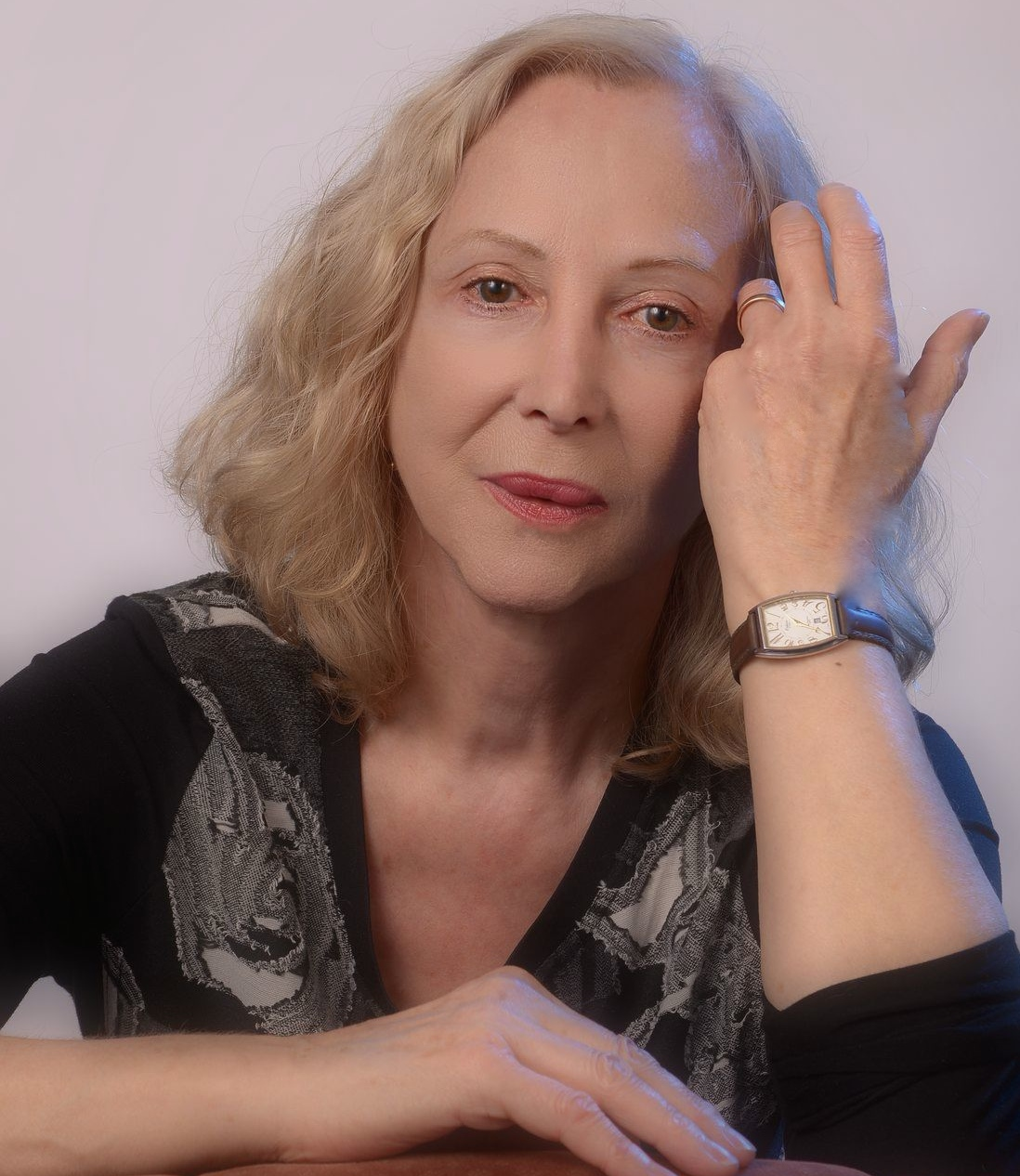
- Anne Lauber, 2015
- Born: 28 July 1943 (age 83); Zürich, Switzerland
- Citizenship: Canadian
- Era: 20th century
- Children: 1

Anne Lauber (born 28 July 1943) is a Canadian composer, conductor, and music educator. A member of the Canadian League of Composers and an associate of the Canadian Music Centre, she has been commissioned to write works by the Quebec Symphony Orchestra, the Toronto Symphony Orchestra, the Canadian Music Competitions, the Canada Council, and the Ministère des Affaires culturelles du Québec among many other groups. In 1985 she was awarded first prize for her Arabesque at the International Guitar Competition in Marl, Germany. She became a naturalized Canadian citizen in 1972. In 2007 the Eastman School of Music featured her in the school's Women in Music Festival. Her son Tristan Lauber is a successful concert pianist.

== Education and work as a teacher ==
Born in Zürich, Switzerland, Lauber studied the violin and piano privately before entering the Lausanne Conservatory in 1964 on a scholarship from the Association des musiciens suisses. She studied there through 1967 where she was a pupil of Andras Kovach and Zoltán Kodály. At the same time she studied music composition privately with Jean Perrin and Darius Milhaud.

In 1967 Lauber came to Canada to pursue studies in music composition privately with André Prévost. She eventually enter the graduate music composition program at the Université de Montréal (UM) where she continued studies with Prévost and Serge Garant. From the UM she earned a Master of Music in 1982 and a Doctor of Music in 1986, both in composition. In 1980 she studied conducting privately with Jacques Clément.

Lauber is a former faculty member of the Université du Québec à Montréal, Université du Québec à Trois-Rivières, Concordia University and the Université de Montréal. She served as the vice-president of the Quebec region of the Canadian Music Centre in 1987, and then was president from 1988 until 1992.
