= André Prévost (composer) =

Canadian composer and music educator

- Born: 30 July 1934; Hawkesbury, Ontario, Canada
- Died: 27 January 2001 (aged 66); Montreal, Quebec, Canada
- Occupations: composer and music educator
- Awards: Order of Canada

André Prévost, OC (30 July 1934 – 27 January 2001) was a Canadian composer and music educator. He was awarded the Canadian Music Council Medal in 1977 and in 1985 he was made an Officer of the Order of Canada. He also received the "Trophy for Concert Music" from the Performing Rights Organization of Canada.

== Early life and education ==
He was born in Hawkesbury, Ontario. He grew up in Saint-Jérôme, Quebec.

Prévost was trained at the Conservatoire de musique du Québec à Montréal where he was a pupil of Isabelle Delorme, Jean Papineau-Couture, and Clermont Pépin. Following graduation, he was awarded grants from the Canada Council and the Government of Québec which enabled him to study with Olivier Messiaen and Henri Dutilleux in Paris. In 1963 he won the Prix d'Europe, an award which provided him with the opportunity to study electroacoustic music under Michel Philippot.

== Career ==
During the 1960s Prévost taught at the Tanglewood Music Centre with fellow faculty members Aaron Copland, Zoltán Kodály, Gunther Schuller and Elliott Carter.

=== Performances ===
In April 1967, the Montreal Symphony Orchestra and the Montreal Festival Choir conducted by Pierre Hétu performed Prévost's major oratorio Terre des hommes, text by Michèle Lalonde, at the Place des arts opening ceremonies of the Expo 67 world's fair in Montreal, attended by the official delegations of the participating countries. The work strongly projected French writer's Antoine de Saint-Exupéry's 'idealist rhetoric', and the designation "Terre Des Hommes" ("Man and his World") was applied to the entire Expo 67 world exposition.

In 1985, Tsuyoshi Tsutsumi and Ronald Turini performed the world premiere of Prévost's Sonata No. 2 for Cello and Piano.

Prévost composed a cello concerto Menuhin: Présence in 2000.

=== University position ===
From the mid-1970s until his retirement in 1996, he was a professor of music at the Université de Montréal. Among his notable students were composers José Evangelista, Denis Gougeon, Anne Lauber, José Manuel Montañés, and Michel Longtin.

=== Compositional style ===
His composition style has been compared to that of Alban Berg and he was regarded as a relatively conservative composer, similar to his contemporary Jacques Hétu.

== Personal ==
Prévost died in Montreal, Quebec, Canada.
