= Liz Phillips =

American artist

- Born: New Jersey, U.S.
- Education: Bennington College
- Known for: Sound art, interactive art, sound sculpture
- Style: Interactive, electronic
- Movement: Sound art
- Spouse: Earl Howard
- Children: 1
- Awards: John Simon Guggenheim Fellowship

Liz Phillips (born 1951) is an American artist specializing in sound art and interactive art. A pioneer in the development of interactive sound sculpture, Phillips' installations explore the possibilities of electronic sound in relation to living forms. Her work has been exhibited at a wide range of major museums, alternative spaces, festivals, and other venues, including the Whitney Museum of American Art, the San Francisco Museum of Modern Art, the Spoleto Festival USA, the Walker Art Center, Ars Electronica, Jacob's Pillow, The Kitchen, and Creative Time. Phillips' collaborations include pieces with Nam June Paik and the Merce Cunningham Dance Company, and her work has been presented by the Cleveland Orchestra, IBM, and the World Financial Center. She is often associated with, and exhibited alongside other early American sound artists Pauline Oliveros, John Cage and Max Neuhaus.

== Early life and education ==
Liz Phillips was born in New Jersey in 1951. Phillips has said that childhood experiences in nature, particularly along the Hudson River near where she grew up, were formative of her interest in sound, water, and space. At one point, she was “torn between making art and studying nature.” Early exposure to art in the museums of New York convinced her to pursue the former, although her intense interest in the latter has remained a consistent thread in Phillips’ work throughout her career. She began attending Bennington College in 1969, where she studied with Cora Cohen, Pat Adams, Philips Wofford, instrument-maker Gunnar Schoenbeck, Joel Chadabe, and Thomas Standish. She received an interdisciplinary B.A in the fields of music and art in 1973.

== Work ==
As early as 1969, Phillips was already developing an approach that she has continued to expand over decades of work and dozens of major pieces. Her idea, she wrote in 1971, was “to create a new kind of environmental space where the structure of the space was defined by human interaction.” At the time, Phillips was known for sound environments that were structured around the communal act of eating. Phillips would “wire” the dinner table, and process the resulting signals using a combination of tuned oscillators, resulting in an electronic soundscape that responded to the sound patterns generated by the participants’ dinner. “To build sound structures I use electromagnetic fields where people actually become electronic components in the circuit,” she wrote at the time in the pages of Radical Software, an early video art journal that was a critical platform for the discussion of emergent media and cybernetic art in the early 1970s. “Therefore, the collective presence and movement of the people in the field feeds back audio responses…. The tones are in response to the total actions and relationships of the participants. The people themselves, are also potential sound structures realized only through contact with other people. With the new feedback, audio and kinestethic patterns evolve." Phillips' inclusion in the pages of Radical Software signals her affinity with and closeness to the early video art scene.

In 1970, Phillips created a work called Sound Structures, which was an installation that made use of a radio frequency capacitance field generated from a piece of metal placed under a rug. Resulting sounds were picked up on AM radios set around the room, initiated and changed by the entrance and movements of participants through the field, their bodies acting as conductors, grounding the field and generating sound. As the participants moved toward the center of the field, the frequency of the sound heard coming from the radios went higher and resulted in heterodynes. Crucial to the artist's design of this complex environment were the important sonic possibilities unlocked by spontaneous group formation and play among the participants.

In 1971, Phillips presented Electronic Banquet at the Eighth Annual Avant Garde Festival of New York, held at the 69th Infantry Regiment Armory on November 19. The festival also featured work by Woody and Steina Vasulka, Yoko Ono, the Videofreex, Douglas Davis and the public debuts of early video synthesizers developed by Shuya Abe and Nam June Paik, as well as one designed by video artist Eric Siegel. Phillips later went on to collaborate with Nam June Paik and dancer Robert Kovich from the Merce Cunningham Dance Company on a commissioned piece.

In 1972, Phillips participated in the Ninth Annual Avant Garde Festival of New York, held aboard the Alexander Hamilton, a riverboat at the South Street Seaport in Manhattan.

In 1974, in collaboration with artist Yoshi Wada, Phillips created a responsive sound installation using RF fields entitled Sum Time at the Everson Museum of Art in Syracuse, New York. Finely tuned speakers created standing waves between themselves that were only activated when people moved through the space. The complex feedback system set up for this piece also involved the use of storage and delay. According to sound artist Charlie Morrow, writing in the pages of the SoHo Weekly News in 1974, “the quality of her selection of storage times is fascinating, and reflects an intuitive grasp of processes as basic as the long waves of energy within the earth’s crust.”

In 1977, Phillips produced City Flow in the pedestrian mall at the City University Graduate Center in New York. The piece incorporated the sounds of passersby as well as the traffic on nearby Forty-second Street. The piece attracted attention and was featured in The New Yorker’s regular “Talk of the Town” column.

At the New Music America festival, held in Minneapolis in 1980, Phillips created Windspun, the first of several ambitious wind-activated sound pieces. Windspun made use of an array of multiple anemometers, each one causing sounds to strengthen and fade. Their multiple locations and complex electronics interacted with the movements of participants in the installation space, resulting in tones that ranged from dense drones to sounds like breathing, depending on the direction and speed of the wind. Slow winds resulted in single tone sounds; stronger winds generated large envelopes of sounds, shaping, combining and fading dense clusters of notes in a process that the artist conceived of as akin to the formation and movement of sand dunes. The second installation of Windspun, in collaboration with Creative Time in New York, was at an alternative energy site operated by the Bronx Frontier Development Corporation on the East River in 1981. This installation made use of a wind turbine on the site. Later wind-activated pieces include Zephyr (1984) and Whitney Windspun, a sound piece included in the 1985 Whitney Biennial.

A 1981 installation at the San Francisco Museum of Modern Art, entitled Sun Spots, was another complex example of what the artist calls a “responsive space,” involving finely tuned RF fields, an archway of coiled copper tubing and a bronze screen hanging from the ceiling of the space. According to a review by composer David Ahlstrom, the capacitance fields generated by the artist allowed audience members to modulate the sound field by moving around the space, activating “tinkly sounds like Chinese wind chimes, percussive little points of sound, cascades of sound that spill like water, and bundles of pointed sound like a million tiny Christmas tree lights flickering on and off.” A second iteration of Sun Spots was installed at the Neuberger Museum of Art at SUNY Purchase in 1982.

Phillips installed the interactive sound sculpture Graphite Ground at the Whitney Museum in the spring of 1988. Video documentation of the installation shows visitors interacting with sculptural objects and generating sounds.

In 1999 Phillips exhibited Echo Evolution at The Kitchen in New York. As in her other work, audience participation is critical to the success of the piece, which used multiple electronic sensors to track participants’ movements in the space, placing them into an interactive relationship with an audio soundtrack, as well as neon visual elements Phillips co-designed with Ken Greenberg. Echo Evolution was shown again, in 2002, at the Hudson River Museum in Yonkers, New York. According to the catalog published with the exhibition “The audience moves along the shore of this space, listening, tuning, sensing, viewing its own abstracted presence within it. This ghosting of the body remains scaled to human proportions yet transcends it as well by extending the boundaries of each body into the exhibition space.”

In 2010, Phillips “re-presented” Beyond/In, a piece first installed in 1974 along the theater walkway at Artpark in Lewiston, New York. The original installation relied on prerecorded sounds of wind and water from the Niagara Gorge. For her reconception of the piece in the lobby at the Albright–Knox Art Gallery in Buffalo, New York, Phillips used updated technology to create an interactive sonic environment, in which participants’ movements through the installation trigger modulations in sounds from the Niagara river at various points.

Phillips maintains an active practice. In 2012, she introduced a work titled Biyuu, shown for the first time at a performance at Roulette, in New York City. The piece, created in collaboration with Butoh dancer Mariko Endo, combines Endo's finely tuned physical movements with Phillips’ live sound and image processing to generate a responsive sound environment that includes video projected onto a weather balloon as well as the movements of the dancer. The video for the piece made use of footage shot on location with Endo in the Edith G. Read Wildlife Sanctuary in Rye, New York.

In 2018, Phillips collaborated with her daughter, artist Heidi Howard, on the creation of Relative Fields in a Garden, a large scale multi-media installation at the Queens Museum. The installation, spanning a 40' wall in the museum's atrium, combined Howard's vivid painting style with Phillip's sound installation work. "The mother and daughter worked simultaneously. Howard invoked a synaesthetic approach–in which she related her brushstrokes and color choices to the experience of hearing Phillips’ sound selections as they played in the atrium of the museum. Both artists convey their perception of physical and emotional environments, transmuted through their respective sensibilities and mediums." In 2020, Phillips and Heidi Howard released a video-gamebased experience of their installation "Relative Fields in a Garden" through Precog Magazine.

== Awards ==
Phillips received the John Simon Guggenheim Fellowship in 1987. Other major awards include grants and commissions from the National Endowment for the Arts, the New York State Council on the Arts, and the Jewish Museum (Manhattan).

== Biography ==
Phillips lives in New York City and is married to the avant-garde composer and musician Earl Howard. Their daughter is visual artist Heidi Howard.
