= Joseph Celli =

American musician and composer

Joseph Celli (born March 19, 1944) is an American musician and composer specializing in contemporary and improvised music for oboe and English horn. In addition, he plays the Yamaha WX7 MIDI breath controller, as well as double reed instruments from several Asian cultures, including the Korean hojok and piri, and the Indian mukha vina.

== Early life ==
Celli is Italian American, both of his parents were born in Italy (from Ripi, Frosinone, Lazio, central Italy) and both immigrated to the U.S. in the early 1920s.

His early training was as a jazz saxophonist which allowed him to work his way through college performing with rhythm and blues and jazz groups as he began specializing in experimental performance for the oboe and English horn. He studied oboe with Ray Still of the Chicago Symphony Orchestra and members of the New York Philharmonic, the Boston Symphony Orchestra, and other leading oboists.

Subsequently, he received a Fulbright Award to study the folk instrument piri with South Korean musician Chung Jae-Gook (hangul: 정재국; hanja: 鄭在國, b. 1942), recognized as National Living Treasure and Important Intangible Cultural Property no. 46; and also to study the Japanese hichiriki at the Imperial Court gagaku in Tokyo.

== Career ==
Celli has conducted much work in the field of experimental music, both as a performer and presenter, and has worked with Jin Hi Kim, John Cage, Ornette Coleman, Phill Niblock, Alvin Curran, Pointless Orchestra, Roberto Carnevale and the Kronos Quartet. He has performed internationally in over 40 countries. With Jerry Hunt, Celli presented the first live satellite performance in the United States. As a concert presenter he has been involved in over 3,000 events including world premieres by Steve Reich, John Cage, and many others. He presented the U.S. premieres of Spiral and Solo by Karlheinz Stockhausen in addition to over 50 works composed for him by various composers.

Celli served as a co-director with Mary Luft of Tigertail Productions for two New Music America festivals in Hartford, Connecticut and Miami, Florida. He is a founding member of the No World Improvisations ensemble and Executive Director of the Black Rock Art Center in Bridgeport, Connecticut, United States. He is also the founder and director of O. O. Discs, a CD label devoted to new music that has released over 70 discs. He is also the founder and director of O. O. Discs, a CD label devoted to new music that has released over 70 discs with world-wide distribution.

Celli can play on both the western oboe and on non-western oboes.

== Discography ==
- Organic Oboe: Premiere American recording of Stockhausen, Celli, Goldstein, and Schwartz. Joseph Celli, oboe, English horn reeds and electronics. O.O. DISC #1.
- Celli Plays Niblock: Niblock for Celli: Compositions by composer Phill Niblock for oboe, English horn performer Joseph Celli. India Navigation Records #3027
- No World Improvisations: Joseph Celli and Jin Hi Kim performing improvisations on English horn, Indian double reed Mukha Veena, Yamaha WX-7 midi breath controller, Korean komungo and changgo. O.O. DISC #2. Digital Recording Compact Disc. Also released and distributed in Asia byWarner Music Korea FL 002.
- Vermont the Seasons: Music of Malcolm Goldstein with Joseph Celli, oboe, English horn and reeds. Folkways Records FX 6242.
- La Belleza Del Silencio: Music of Orlando Jacinto Garcia with Joseph Celli, Yamaha WX-7 midi breath controller. O.O. DISC #6. Digital Recording Compact Disc.
- Non World (Trio) Improvisations: Joseph Celli, Jin Hi Kim with Alvin Curran, electronics; Shelley Hirsch, vocals; Malcolm Goldstein, violin; Mor Thiam, African Percussion; Adam Plack, didgeridoo. O.O. DISC #4. Digital Recording Compact Disc.
- Resolver: Music of composer David First with Joseph Celli performing on Yamaha WX-7 midi breath controller. O.O. DISC #5. Digital Recording Compact Disc.
- Video Ears – Music Eyes: Video Music of Joseph Celli Four compositions featuring Malcolm Goldstein, Ulrich Krieger, Brian Johnson, Jin Hi Kim and Grupo de Musica Folklorica del Peru. O. O. DISC #22. Digital Recording Compact Disc.
- Living Tones: Music of Jin Hi Kim with Joseph Celli performing on oboe and English horn. O. O. DISC #24. (Seoul Records/ Cantabile in Korea). Digital Recording Compact Disc.
- Inori: A Prostituta Sagrada, Music Jocy de Oliveira. Joseph Celli, double reed instruments. ReR Records BJOCD, Digital Recording Compact Disc.
- Bitter Love: Songs From Peony Pavilion, Tan Dun, composer; Sony Classical Records.
