= Electronic Music Foundation =

U.S. non-profit organization

Electronic Music Foundation (EMF) is a not-for-profit 501(c)(3) organization that produces events, publishes and disseminates media and information, and provides access to materials relevant to the history and creative potential of electronic music.

The organization was founded in 1994 by composer Joel Chadabe.

In 2000, the EMF Institute website was created in order to provide public access to educational resources relating to electronic music. The project was done in collaboration with the UNESCO Digi-Arts portal.
