= Richard Carrick =

American composer, pianist and conductor

Richard David Carrick (born 1971 in Paris, France) is an American composer, pianist and conductor. He was a Guggenheim Fellow in Music Composition for 2015–16 while living in Kigali, Rwanda. His compositions are influenced by diverse sources including traditional Korean Gugak music, the flow concept of Mihaly Csikszentmihalyi, Gnawa Music of Morocco, Jazz, experimental music, concepts of infinity, the works of Italo Calvino and Ludwig Wittgenstein, and his work as improviser.

He is co-founder/co-artistic director of the critically acclaimed experimental music ensemble Either/Or with whom he performs regularly as pianist and conductor.

Carrick is currently Chair of the Composition Department at Berklee College of Music. In 2011 and 2013 Carrick was Adjunct Associate Professor of Composition at Columbia University and taught composition and history at New York University 2009–2012. For a decade he trained young composers for the New York Philharmonic in New York City and internationally.

He has received numerous awards including a 2015–16 Guggenheim Fellowship, 2015 Gugak Fellowship for Korean Traditional Music, and a Fromm Commission of Harvard University.

His music, described as "charming, with exoticism and sheer infectiousness" by Allan Kozinn of The New York Times, has been performed internationally by the New York Philharmonic, Vienna's Konzerthaus, ISCM World Music Days-Switzerland], Darmstadt Summer Festival, Tokyo International House, Merkin Hall, Nieuw Ensemble, JACK Quartet, Nouvel Ensemble Moderne, soloists Tony Arnold, Marilyn Nonken, Magnus Andersson, Carin Levine, Rohan de Saram, David Shively, and others.

== Education ==
He received his BA in Mathematics and Music from Columbia University with Mario Davidovsky, a Masters and Doctorate from the University of California-San Diego with Brian Ferneyhough, and pursued further studies at IRCAM (Stage d'Ete) and the Koninklijk Conservatorium in The Hague.

== Career ==
Recent works include the 2015 CD release, Cycles of Evolution, which incorporates pieces commissioned and performed by the NYPHIL BIENNIAL, Either/Or, Sweden's Ensemble Son, Hotel Elefant, The String Orchestra of Brooklyn, and DZ4. Carrick conducts or performs on all works on this CD, including Namdaemun, Adagios, Dark Flow Double Quartet, and more. Carrick's improvisation-based disc Stone Guitars garnered critical attention in both the new music and guitar worlds. The hour-long Flow Cycle for Strings (released on New World Records in 2011) is regularly performed by soloists and duos/trios. Other recent works include String Quartet #2-Space:Time, Harmonixity for Saxophone Quartet and la touche sonore for solo piano. He also writes large-scale multi-media works combining video, electronics and live musicians, including the "operatically ambitious" (The Village Voice) Cosmicomics, based on stories by Italo Calvino and the "apocalyptic" [New York Arts] Prisoner's Cinema.

Select recent works are published by Project Schott New York.

As conductor and pianist, he has premiered numerous works by distinguished composers including Helmut Lachenmann, Chaya Czernowin, Jonny Greenwood, Karin Rehnqvist, George E. Lewis, Elliott Sharp, John Zorn, Anthony Coleman.

He also improvises on piano and occasionally on electric guitar. Works include a solo electric guitar CD (Stone Guitars) in preparation, solo piano CD, as well as performances with Jin Hi Kim, Chris Cochrane, Annie Gosfield, David Wallace, and others.

He has given University masterclasses on his own compositions in Tokyo, Seoul, London, Stockholm, Amsterdam, Paris, Darmstadt, and New York City.

== Selected works ==
Orchestral

- Two Moments (2005)
- Find the Devil's Lead (2008)
- Adagios for string orchestra (2011)
- Elegy for string orchestra (2011)
- Solo for string orchestra (2011)

Chamber music

- Identities...Graduals 2332 3212 for flute, oboe, clarinet, bassoon, trumpet, horn, trombone and double bass (1996, revised 1999)
- Masculin-Feminin for 2 violins (1996)
- Family Resemblances for oboe or soprano saxophone, piano and percussion (1997, revised 2012)
- Sculpture Idle Ceremony for violin and percussion (1997)
- Natural Behaviour for solo percussion (1998, revised 2004)
- Paralléle-Parallaxe for oboe and harp soloists with violin, viola and cello (1999)
- The Veins of Marble for 12 players (2000), or 10 players (2012 version)
- The Fall for chamber ensemble with video projection (2001)
- Phosphéne for 2 violins (2001)
- Snow, Silence, Sleep for piano and string quartet (2002)
- entre nous for solo violin with vocal sounds (2004)
- L'idée sans l'deal for violin, cello and piano (2005, revised 2007)
- in flow for solo violin (2006)
- Balagan for tenor saxophone, electric guitar and accordion (2007)
- Duo Flow for violin and cello (2007)
- European Images for solo cello with video and pre-recorded audio (2007)
- Nezilat ha Balagan for violin and double bass (2007)
- Shadow Flow for solo viola (2007)
- Towards Qualia for violin, cello, piano and vibraphone (2007)
- Find the Devil's Lead for chamber ensemble (2008)
- Moroccan Flow (unfolding from unity) for solo cello (2008)
- Towards Qualia Sextet for flute, tenor saxophone (or bass clarinet), violin, cello, piano and vibraphone (2008)
- a cause du soleil, Flow Trio for violin, viola and cello (2009)
- la scène miniature for piccolo and cello (2009)
- la scène miniature quartet for violin (or flute), tenor saxophone (or bass clarinet), piano, musical saw (or cello) (2009)
- Les Scènes Acoustiques for solo guitar (2009–2010)
- Adagios for 2 violins, viola and cello (2009), or for 2 violins, viola, cello and double bass (2010)
- Sonic Tapestry Communication for violin, cello, bass clarinet, piano and CD Playback of nature sound recordings (2010)
- une for flute and piano (2010)
- Stone Guitars for solo electric guitar (or string quartet, or 2 electric guitars) and 4 pre-recorded electronically processed electric guitars (2010, 2011)
- Harmonixity for saxophone quartet (2012)
- Sub-merge for piano, oboe, clarinet, horn, bassoon (2013)
- Prisoner's Cinema for 10 players, conductor and video projection (2013)
- Dark Flow – Double Quartet for violin, cello, piano, cimbalom, alto saxophone, trombone, acoustic guitar and percussion (2013)
- Namdaemun for flute, oboe, clarinet, trombone, horn, 2 violins, viola, cello, bass, percussion (2014)
- "Space-Time String Quartet #2" (2015)
- "Seongeum" for solo violin (2015)
- "Orgo" for ensemble, dedicated to Iancu Dumitrescu and Ana Maria Avram (2016)

Piano

- Slowness and Tight (1996)
- Ruby, My Dear for solo piano and three TV monitors with pre-recorded and live video and audio (1997)
- Containment, 8 Layered Piano Improvisations (2002)
- Pianos for solo piano with two pre-recorded piano tracks on CD (2002)
- Légèreté (2002)
- ∞ + 1 (2006–2007)
- Stone Organ for pianist and CD playback of pre-recorded organ (2010)
- Descretize for pianist and CD playback of pre-recorded piano (2010)
- la touche sonore sous l'eau for solo piano (2011–14)
- "Les Ciels de Kigali" for solo piano (2016)

Electric Guitar Quartet

- Stone Guitars full live set (2015, 45 min)

Vocal

- A Slow Duet for soprano and flute (1995)
- Notebook, Bedside for soprano, percussion and piano (2004, revised 2012)
- Cosmicomics for singer, flute, oboe, bass clarinet, violin, viola, cello, trombone and percussion (2005)
