= Francisco Salva Campillo =

Spanish/Catalan prominent late-Enlightenment period scientist

- Francesc Salvà i Campillo
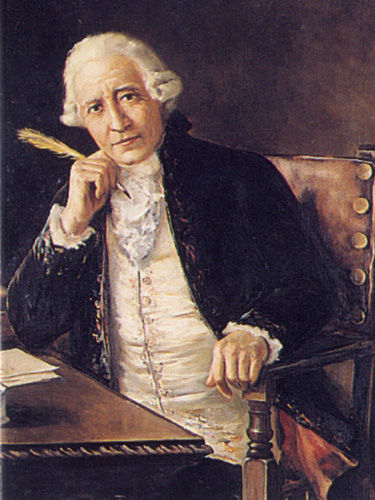
- Francisco Salva Campillo (1900) by José María Marqués y García; tribute paid to him by the Royal Academy of Medicine of Catalonia
- Born: July 12, 1751; Barcelona, Catalonia, Spain
- Died: February 13, 1828 (aged 76)
- Other name: Francisco Salvá
- Education: University of Valencia, University of Huesca, Spain, University of Toulouse
- Parents: Jerome Salvà Pontich (father); Eulalia Campillo (mother)

Francisco Salva Campillo (Catalan: Francesc Salvà i Campillo, July 12, 1751 – February 13, 1828) was a Spanish Catalan prominent late-Enlightenment period scientist known for working as a physician, physicist, and meteorologist.

== Early life and education ==
Francisco Salva Campillo was born in Barcelona, Catalonia, Spain, on July 12, 1751. He was the son of Dr. Jerome Salvà Pontich, a staff physician at Barcelona General Hospital and Eulalia Campillo, his mother came from a wealthy family that worked in the pharmacy industry. During his adolescence, his extraordinary abilities attracted the attention of the Bishop of Barcelona, Josep Climent, who advised his parents to let him study medicine in Valencia.

He studied at the University of Valencia, where he completed his course in three years instead of the usual four. In 1771, he successfully passed the B.Phil. degree in medicine from the University of Huesca, Spain. He later earned his doctorate in medicine at the University of Toulouse.

== Medical career ==
He started a medical school in Barcelona in an effort to train more doctors and took a special interest in vaccination, particularly against the disease of smallpox. He received several awards from the Paris Society of Medicine.

In 1773, he became, along with Vincent Mitjavila, one of the founding teachers of the Academy of Medical Practice, which is now part of the University of Barcelona (Universitat de Barcelona), Faculty of Medicine. This school was founded in an attempt to unite the two disciplines of clinical and non-clinical studies into a ‘united faculty'.

== Telegraphy ==
In 1795, Dr. Salva presented at the Royal Academy of Sciences and Arts of Barcelona (Spanish: Real Academia de Ciencias y Artes de Barcelona) his first report devoted to "Electricity Applied to Telegraphy." Salva demonstrated the basis of electric telegraphy, anticipating the wireless telegraph and undersea cables.

The presentation of Salva attracted the attention of government and he received a formal invitation to demonstrate his telegraphic skills before the Royal Family in Aranjuez.

== Legacy ==
Salva died on February 13, 1828. He left behind a massive library composed of more than five hundred thousand volumes on medical topics. Along with these works, he bequeathed to the Royal Academy of Medicine of Barcelona a sum of four thousand pounds and in accordance with his will, his heart is preserved in an urn, with his books at the same location.

Artist Paul DeMarinis was inspired by Salva for his work The Messenger (1998–2006), which examines the myths of electricity in communication.
