= Richard Lainhart =

- Richard Lainhart performing

Background information
- Born: Richard Morris Lainhart; February 14, 1953; Vestal, New York
- Origin: Albany, NY
- Died: December 30, 2011 (aged 58) New City, NY
- Occupations: composer, performer, and filmmaker

Richard Lainhart (February 14, 1953 – December 30, 2011) was an American composer of electronic music that combines analog and digital instrumentation with extended performance techniques derived from traditional acoustic instruments. Lainhart's music is particularly associated with the renaissance of modular analog synthesis, and frequently performed with a Buchla 200e modular synthesizer controlled by a Haken Audio Continuum multidimensional keyboard controller.

== Early influences ==
Originally from Vestal, New York, Lainhart studied electronic music at the State University of New York (Binghamton) from 1971 to 1973. In 1973 he worked with director Nicholas Ray on the soundtrack to one of Ray's final films, We Can't Go Home Again, although Lainhart's score was not used in the final version. Lainhart earned his bachelor's degree in music from the State University at New York at Albany, where he studied composition and electronic music with composer Joel Chadabe and worked extensively with the Coordinated Electronic Music Studio (CEMS), at the time the largest integrated Moog modular synthesizer system in the world.

While a student at Albany, Lainhart assisted and performed with many celebrated guest composers, including John Cage, David Tudor, Phill Niblock, David Behrman, Beth Anderson, Luis de Pablo, Harley Gaber, Daniel Goode, and Giuseppe Englert.

Throughout his early musical career, Lainhart mastered numerous traditional instruments in addition to his electronic explorations, playing bass in several rock bands and eventually heading the popular swing jazz ensemble, Doc Scanlon and The Rhythm Boys, performing on mallet instruments and keyboards.

== As a composer ==
In 1987, Lainhart released his first solo recording of electronic music, These Last Days for the Periodic Music CD label. The music's characteristic blend of impressionist sonorities, minimalist structures and real-time performance techniques established an early reputation that spanned the worlds of ambient music, jazz, new age and the avant garde. A follow-up recording, Polychromatic Integers, was prepared but remained unreleased until 2011 on the Periphery label.

Numerous recordings for CD, vinyl and the Internet followed since then, establishing Lainhart's reputation as one of the seminal American composers working in the electronic medium. In all, Lainhart composed over 150 electronic and acoustic works, utilizing virtually every extension of electronic and acoustic instrumentation. In 2001, a retrospective of Lainhart's early works, 10,000 Shades Of Blue, was released on the XI label.

== Later works ==
In 2008, Lainhart was commissioned by the Electronic Music Foundation to contribute a work to New York Soundscape. In 2009, he was one of 200 electric guitarists who performed in the US premiere of Rhys Chatham's "A Crimson Grail" at Lincoln Center in New York City. In July 2010, he performed as a featured electronic artist at Avantgarde Festival Schiphorst 2010 in Schiphorst, Germany.

As a synthesist, Lainhart has enjoyed a fruitful series of musical collaborations with celebrated Dream Theater keyboardist Jordan Rudess, including a DVD of duets entitled A Fistful Of Patchcords and several independent CDs.

== Films and multimedia ==
Lainhart's animations and short films have been shown at festivals in the United States, the United Kingdom, Canada, Portugal, Italy, France, Spain, Germany, and Korea, and online at Souvenirs From Earth, ResFest, The New Venue, The Bitscreen, and Streaming Cinema 2.0.

His film A Haiku Setting won awards in several categories at the 2002 International Festival of Cinema and Technology in Toronto. In 2009, he was awarded a Film & Media grant by the New York State Council on the Arts for No Other Time, a full-length intermedia performance designed for a large reverberant space, combining live analog electronics with four-channel playback, and high-definition computer-animated film projection.

In January 2010, he performed as a featured live media audio-visual artist at Netmage 2010 in Bologna, Italy. In December 2010, his year-long timescape film One Year won the Deffie award for Best Experimental Film at HDFEST 2010 in Portland, OR.

== Discography ==
=== Solo works ===
- "These Last Days" Periodic Music CD PE-1633, 1987
- "Ten Thousand Shades of Blue" XI Records CD XI 115, 2001
- "White Night" Ex Ovo CD EXO1974, 2008
- "The Luminous Air" (split with Hakobune)"Luminous Accidents", Tobira Records 10" vinyl EP, tbr 01, 2009
- "The Course of the River" VICMOD Records CD VMD07, 2010
- "Cranes Fly West - Limited Schiphorst Edition 2010" Ex Ovo CD, EXO004, 2010
- "Polychromatic Integers" Periphery CD OTP2011, 2011

=== Compilations ===
- "Red Dust" (with Signs of Life) Vacant Lot LP, 1987
- "White Nights (Remix)""I, Mute Hummings" Ex Ovo CD EXO001, 2006
- "Lift-off" "Galactic Hits - Musique et Science-Fiction" Vibrations Magazine #122 CD, 2010
- "From Above" "Meditations on Light" Monochrome Vision 2-CD set, MV35, 2011
- "Forming" "Tobira Compilation Volume 1" Tobira Records C60 cassette, tbr09, 2011

=== Collaborations ===
- "An Abandoned Garden" (with Lucio Menegon) Rubber City Noise LP, 2013

=== DVDs ===
- A Fistful Of Patchcords (with Jordan Rudess) Airglow Music DVD AM-001, 2006
