= Kim Jin-hi =

South Korean geomungo player (born 1957)

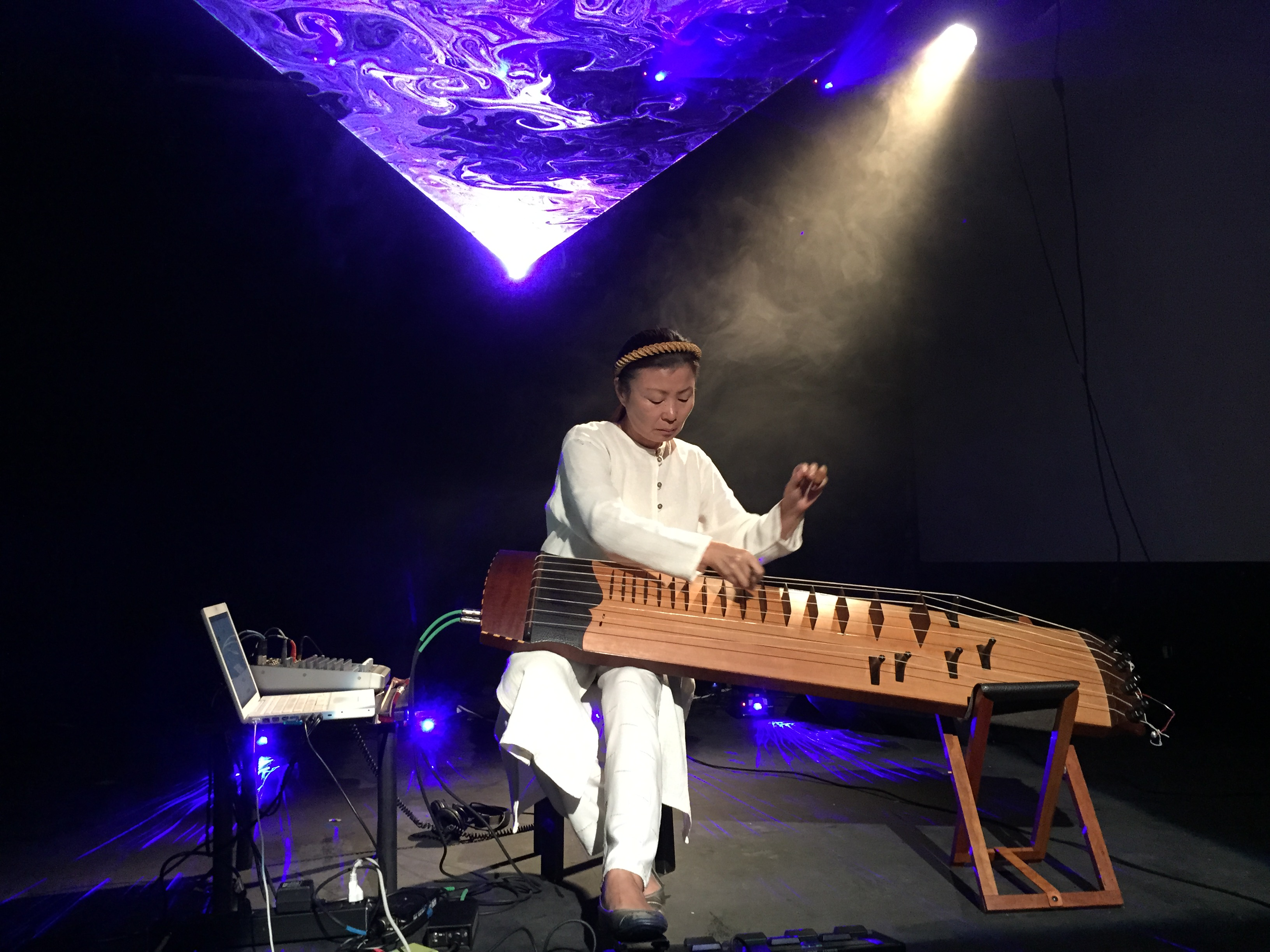
- Kim playing the komungo in 2015

Korean name
- Hangul: 김진희
- RR: Gim Jinhui
- MR: Kim Chinhŭi

Kim Jin-hi (Korean: 김진희; born February 6, 1957) is a composer and performer of komungo and electric komungo, and a Korean music specialist.

Kim is known as a pioneer for introducing geomungo (거문고, a Korean fretted board zither, also spelled komungo) to American contemporary classical music scene through her own cross-cultural chamber and orchestral compositions and her extensive solo work in avant-garde, as well as cross-cultural free improvisation. She is a Guggenheim fellow in composition and her recent works include the development of komungobot (algorithmic robotic instrument) and solo performances of the world's only electric komungo with live interactive MIDI computer system in her large-scale multimedia performance pieces.

Kim has received commissions from the American Composers Orchestra, Kronos Quartet, and Tan Dun's New Generation of East for Chamber Music Society of Lincoln Center, among others.

During the last three decades Kim has performed as a komungo soloist in her own compositions at Carnegie Hall, Lincoln Center, Kennedy Center (Washington, D.C.), Smithsonian Freer Gallery of Art (Washington, DC), Metropolitan Museum of Art, Asia Society (NYC), Haus der Kulturen der Welt (Berlin), and for collaborative improvisations at Royal Festival Hall (London), Venice Biennale, Moers Festival (Germany) and many significant international festivals throughout the USA, Europe, Canada, Latin America, South America, Russia, Asia, New Zealand, and Australia.

== Biography ==
=== Early life ===
Kim was born in Incheon, South Korea.

She began studies of traditional Korean music in South Korea in 1973, at her father's recommendation. She received a full scholarship to study at South Korea's first National High School for Korean Traditional Music (국립국악고등학교), one of 60 students accepted in the first year. The school was established under Ministry of Culture in association with the prestigious National Gugak Center for Korean Traditional Performing Arts (국립국악원). There, she practiced court orchestra music, learned both court and folk styles of singing (가곡 kagok, 판소리 pansori, 민요 folk song), drumming (장고 janggo) and bamboo flutes (단소 danso, 소금 sogeum), and selected the geomungo (거문고, a six feet long board zither with sixteen frets and six silk strings that are plucked with a thin bamboo stick) as her major instrument. Her selection of the instrument was audacious; dating to the fourth century, the geomungo had been favored particularly by male Confucian scholars, and was generally not played by women. Upon graduation she received Ministry of Culture's Outstanding Student Award (문화공보부장관상). She continued her studies with Korea's leading ethnomusicologists earning a B.A. degree in Korean traditional music theory and composition from Seoul National University in 1980. Upon graduation she received an award for rising new musicians and her composition was premiered for KBS-TV national broadcasting.

=== Move to the United States ===
Interested in learning more about the musics of other cultures but aware that this would not be possible in Korea, Kim emigrated in August 1980 to the United States, where she immersed herself in world music. She first attended the San Francisco Conservatory of Music and studied composition with John Adams for one year then transferred to Mills College in Oakland, California, where she studied with Lou Harrison, Terry Riley, David Rosenboom, and Larry Polansky and received an MFA in electronic music and recording media in 1985. She was awarded Paul Merrit Henry Prize upon graduation.

While in California, she also studied the Chinese guqin (an ancient 7-stringed zither) and Indian bansuri (bamboo flute) from G. S. Sachdev, and began to investigate the possibility of cross-cultural creative music.

During the 1980s, she regularly attended the New Music America festival, where she met many noted contemporary composers including John Cage, La Monte Young, Steve Reich, Philip Glass, Terry Riley, Lou Harrison, Laurie Anderson, Pauline Oliveros, Joan La Barbara, Morton Subotnick, Meredith Monk, Joseph Celli, Malcolm Goldstein, David Moss, Elliott Sharp, John Zorn and many others. From 1982 to 1988, she worked as a correspondent, interviewing and writing over 30 articles about those contemporary American composers for Eumak Dong-A, a Korean monthly music magazine published by the Dong-A Daily News.

Plunged into the American avant-garde music scene, she was invited to the Composer-to-Composer festival directed by Charles Amirkhanian in Telluride, Colorado, in 1989 and joined the one-week residency with John Cage and selected leading composers.

Kim premiered her commissioned works predominately in New York City and travels worldwide performing. Kim lives in Connecticut and teaches in the Music Department at Wesleyan University.

== Instruments ==
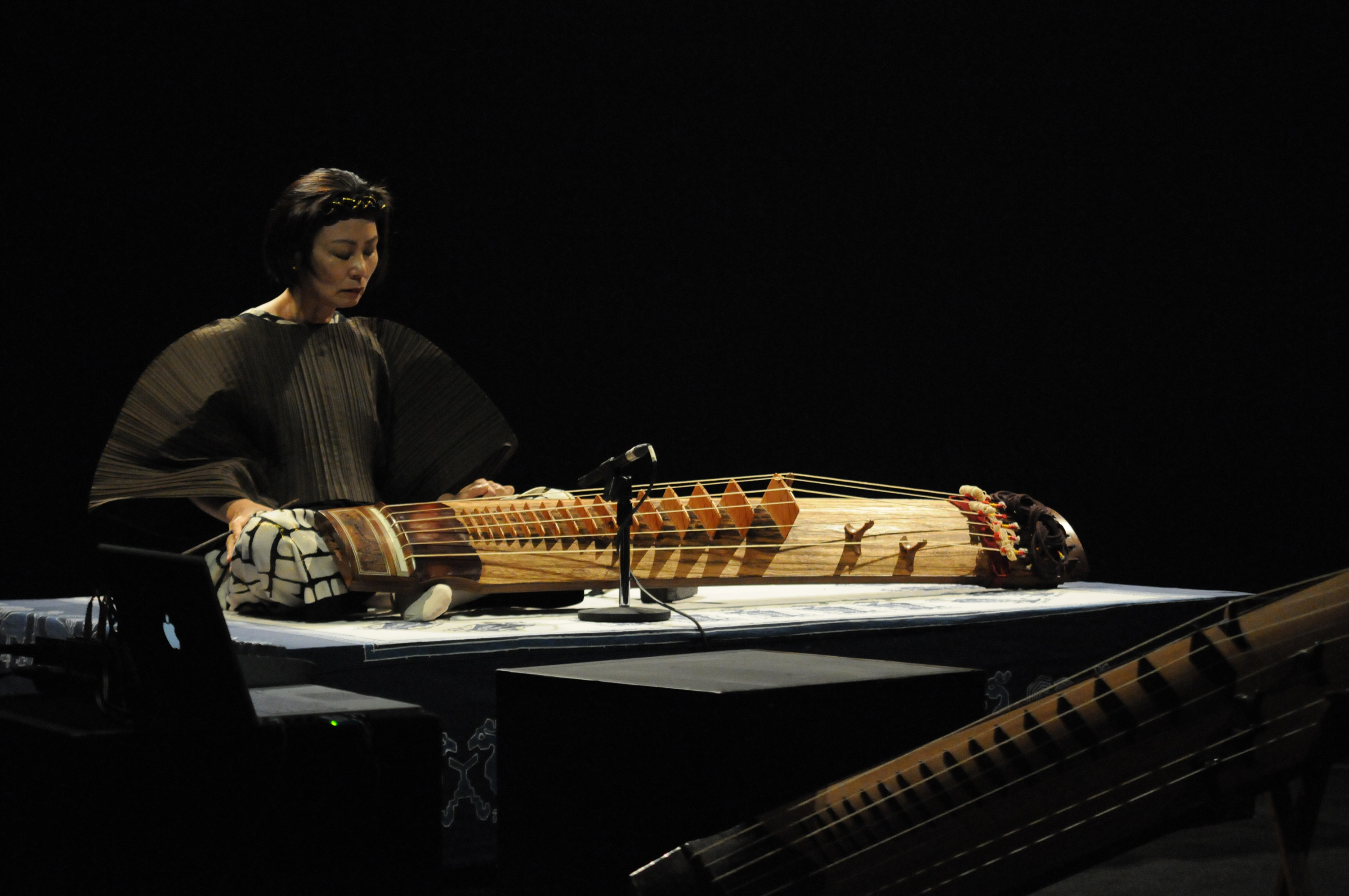
Jin Hi Kim with komungo

Jin Hi Kim's primary instrument is the geomungo, though she also plays Korean percussion instruments such as janggo and dancer's barrel drum set. With the Toronto instrument builder Joseph Yanuziello in 1998 Kim co-designed and now plays the electric komungo, for which she has created numerous interactive pieces with a MIDI computer system using MAX/MSP programmed by Alex Noyes. In collaboration with Alex Noyes Kim is developing komungobot, an algorithmic robotic instrument.

== Career and works ==
Kim has released 15 CDs, including Living Tones, Komungo, Pulses, Komunguitar, Sargeng, No World Improvisations, and Sound Universe.

=== Cross-cultural compositions: Living Tones ===
Jin Hi Kim's compositions for Korean and Western instruments (both alone and in combination) have as their central focus the exploration of the Korean concept of shigimse (시김새), the technique of ornamentation used in traditional vocal and instrumental music. Although the term's literal meaning is not known, in 1985 Kim began to use the term "living tones" to describe this attitude toward melodic material as she applied it in her work. Thus, her compositions use newly developed forms of notation to indicate various types of vibrato, pitch bends, etc. in order that, as in Korean traditional music, each musical tone is given a unique expression and development. Kim's Living Tones CD features her signature bi-cultural compositions Nong Rock for string quartet and komungo, Tchong for flute and daegum, Piri Quartet for oboe/English horn with three piri(s) and Yoeum for kagok singer and baritone.

In 1986 she began to be recognized as a composer when she was commissioned by the Kronos Quartet for her work Linking. Jin Hi Kim is both composer and soloist for the following compositions: Nong Rock for the Kronos Quartet premiered at Alice Tully Hall, Lincoln Center in 1992; Voices of Sigimse for Chamber Music Society of Lincoln Center premiered at the Lincoln Center Summer Festival 1996 with Tan Dun conducting; Eternal Rock (2001) for American Composers Orchestra premiered at Carnegie Hall; and Tilings (2013) for Either/Or Ensemble conducted by Richard Carrick premiered at The Kitchen (NYC).

Kim also has introduced Korean tall and colorful barrel drums in the orchestra. Eternal Rock II (2006) was commissioned and premiered by the Boston Modern Orchestra Project, conducted by Gil Rose with Gerry Hemingway as soloist on drums. Monk Dance (2007) was commissioned and premiered by the New Haven Symphony Orchestra with Kim as soloist on the drums and Jung-Ho Pak conducting. Kim was Music Alive Composer-in-Residence with New Haven Symphony Orchestra (2009–2011) for which she premiered her commissioned Nori III for electric komungo and percussion quartet.

In 1998 Kim was featured composer for the Festival Nieuwe Muziek and Agate Slice was commissioned for Xenakis Ensemble (the Netherlands). Kim also performed her compositions as soloist with Empire State Youth Orchestra, Stanford Symphony, KBS Symphony (Korea), Zeitgeist, and Kairos String Quartet (Berlin).

=== Sociopolitical compositions ===
Responding to two wars involving American military in Asia, Jin Hi Kim composed two pieces, Child of War (2014) and One Sky (2005). A mixed choral piece, Child of War was dedicated to Kim Phuc who is renowned for 'the girl in the picture' during the Vietnam War, was commissioned by John Marshall Lee and world premiered by The Mendelssohn Choir of Connecticut and Kim, conducted by Carole Ann Maxwell at Quick Center, Fairfield University. One Sky (2005), for chamber string orchestra and electric komungo, is dedicated to the reunification of North and South Korea, which was commissioned and performed by the Great Mountain Music Festival Orchestra, with Kim as soloist, at the Korean Demilitarized Zone (DMZ); Kim was featured on BBC The World/Global Hit radio program directed by Marco Werman for her One Sky; and the work was broadcast on KBS TV.

In collaboration with artist David Chung at the University of Michigan, Kim composed two soundtracks: Pyongyang, a multimedia installation, and Koryo Saram, an hour long documentary film about Korean refugees from Russia to Kazakhstan which was presented at Harvard University, Princeton University, Smithsonian Institution Freer Gallery of Art, and the Sackler Gallery (Washington, DC) and international film festivals including Sãn Paulo International Film Festival, Toronto Reel Asian International Film Festival, San Francisco Asian American International Film Festival, Vancouver Asian Film Festival and European Film Festival.

=== Multimedia performances ===
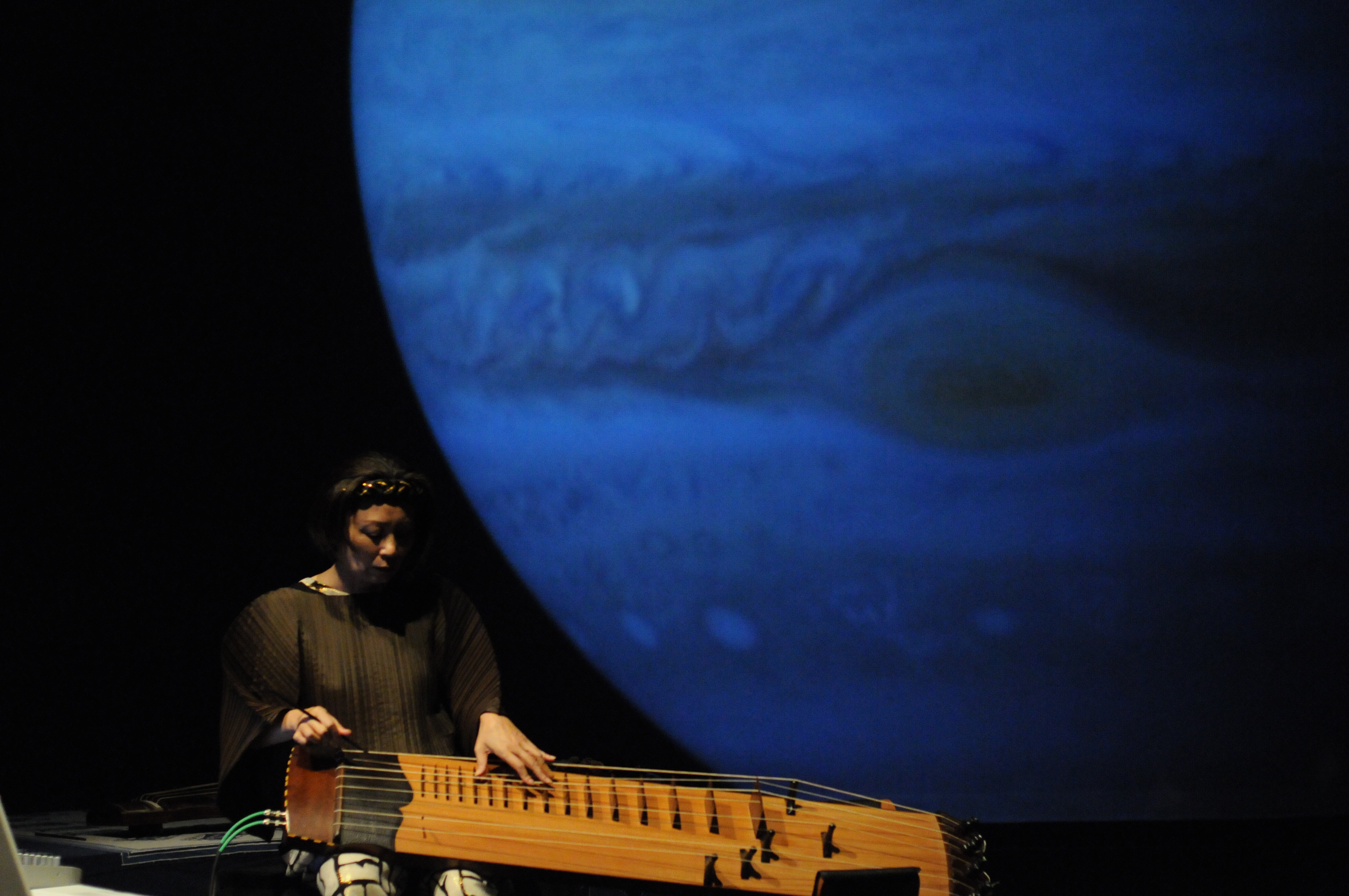
Jin Hi Kim with electric komungo

Kim has created hour-long cross-cultural multimedia works that led to a new direction incorporating Asian cultural heritage interfaced with emerging Western interactive technology.

- Ghost Komungobot (2015): a true experience of mystic birds, for komungobot, electric komungo and visual design, in collaboration with Alex Noyes (interactive sound design) and Benton C Bainbridge (visual media) was co-produced by Harvestworks Digital Media Arts Center and CultureHub, The Art & Technology Center at La MaMa in New York City. Ghost Komungobot is a reflection of emerging aspects of American culture including robots, artificial intelligence, and explorations of multidimensional space in the universe.
- Digital Buddha (2007–2014): a cosmic meditation, for electric komungo and komungo with video art (of Benton C Bainbridge and Joel Cadman), was performed at Metropolitan Museum of Art in 2004 and again in conjunction of 2014 Exhibition Silla; Korea's Golden Kingdom, Expo Cibao (Dominican Republic), Expo Zaragoza (Spain), Detroit Institute of Art, Korea Festival, Art & Ideas Festival (New Haven, Conn.), Festival Salihara (Indonesia), Bandung International Digital Art Festival (Indonesia), Roulette (New York City, NY), Cornell University, Yale University, Stanford Pacific-Asia Music Festival and Michigan University. Digital Buddha contrast both the neurotic intensity of American life with daily Asian meditative practice.
- Touching The Moons (2000): a multi-media lunar ritual, interfaced electric komungo, Indian tabla, a Korean kagok singer, and an Indian kathak dancer with a computer-controlled MIDI system, sensors, and digital animation. Touching The Moons, won Wolff Ebermann Prize of International Theater Institute (Germany), was commissioned and premiered by The Kitchen (NYC) and performed at the Kennedy Center for the Performing Arts. Touching The Moons challenges the duality of Asian mythology and American scientific exploration of the Moon.
- Sanjo Ecstasy: a 90-minute improvisational form for electric komungo, gayageum, haegum, janggo, drum set, and shaman trance dancer, was premiered at the Sanjo Festival in Jeonju, South Korea in 2003.
- Dragon Bond Rite (1997): a masked dance and music, juxtaposed with diverse traditions from India, Indonesia, Korea, Japan, Tuva, and the United States. The work was commissioned and premiered at the Japan Society and performed at the John F. Kennedy Center for Performing Arts.

=== Cross-cultural improvisations ===
In 1986 Kim met Henry Kaiser and was quickly introduced to many other leading guitarists in the United States and Europe. Since then, she has improvised at many international festivals with Elliott Sharp, Bill Frisell, Derek Bailey, Hans Reichel, Eugene Chadbourne, James Newton, Evan Parker, Joseph Celli, Malcolm Goldstein, Oliver Lake, Billy Bang, William Parker, Leroy Jenkins, Peter Kowald, Reggie Workman, Mark Dresser, Joëlle Léandre, Jane Ira Bloom, Rüdiger Carl, Gerry Hemingway, and many other prominent figures in new music and avant-garde jazz.

For her own compositions and for collective creativity, she has improvised with traditional master artists from Asia and Africa including Kongar-Ol Ondar, Min Xiao-Fen, Wu Man, Samir Chatterjee, Mayumi Miyata, Vikku Vinayakram, Abraham Adzenyah, and Mor Thiam.

== Awards ==
Kim received a 2001 Foundation for Contemporary Arts Grants to Artists Award, which was created by John Cage and Jasper Johns. She is a recipient of the composer fellowship from Guggenheim Foundation, American Composers Orchestra, National Endowment for the Arts, MAP fund from Rockefeller Foundation, McKnight Visiting Composer, Mary Flagler Cary Charitable Trust, Meet The Composer, Wolff Ebermann Prize of International Theater Institute, and Connecticut Commission on the Arts. She received the artist residence fellowship for the Rockefeller Foundation Bellagio Center (Italy), Asian Cultural Council to Japan and Indonesia, Fulbright Special Project to Vietnam, Djerassi Foundation (California), Composers Now Creative Residencies (Pocantico Center of Rockefeller Brothers Fund), and Freeman Artist-In-Residence at Cornell University.

== Works about ==
An autobiography, Komungo Tango covering her 25-year performing career, was published (in the Korean language) in 2007.

A retrospective interview about Kim's major works was archived in Oral History of American Music at Yale University Library.

Kim is featured in Free Music Production (FMP)-In Retrospect, published in Berlin, Germany.
