= Paul DeMarinis =

American composer

- Born: 1948 (age 77–78); Cleveland, Ohio
- Education: Antioch College, Mills College
- Known for: Sound and visual art, arts education

Paul DeMarinis (born 1948) is an American visual and sound artist, specializing in electronic music, sound, performance, and computer-based art. Since the 1970s he has been active in creating digital sound sculptures, one of the early innovators of sound art. He is currently a professor of art at Stanford University.

== Early life and education ==
Born in 1948 in Cleveland, Ohio.

DeMarinis received a B.A. in Music and Filmmaking Interdisciplinary from Antioch College in 1971. At Antioch College, DeMarinis studied film with Paul Sharits, music with John Ronsheim and philosophy with Keith McGary. DeMarinis received an M.F.A. in Electronic Music and the Recording Media from Mills College in 1973. At Mills College, DeMarinis studied music composition with Robert Ashley and Terry Riley.

== Career ==
DeMarinis' performance pieces and interactive installations have been featured in international exhibitions and festivals.

DeMarinis in 1996 received a Foundation for Contemporary Arts Grants to Artists Award. He received the 2006 Golden Nica Award for Interactive Art at the Ars Electronica Festival for his installation The Messenger, which examines the myths of electricity in communication. He was awarded the John Simon Guggenheim Foundation fellowship award in 1999 for Video & Audio.

In the late 1970s he was a member of the San Francisco Bay Area-based experimental music collective The League of Automatic Music Composers.

DeMarinis has investigated abandoned technologies and the history of electronic inventions and telecommunications. Some of his installation works have used optics and computers and featured processed and synthesized speech.

DeMarinis taught computer, video and audio art at Mills College, Wesleyan University, San Francisco State University and the New York State College of Ceramics. He is currently a professor of art at Stanford University in California.

== Selected artworks ==
- Helmholtz (DUO) (2015) large glass spheres act as sound resonators for low frequency noises, and various sized flames and rotating mirrors are used to show the visualization of the vibrations. There is a relationship in this piece between the histories of acoustic psychology and the physics of sound, with influence from the manometric flame apparatus and Helmholtz resonators.
- Tympanic Alley (2015) sound installation piece involving aluminum pie plates suspended and a simple metal piece striking them to create a complex soundscape reminiscent of the sounds of rain.
- Jiffy POP (2013)
- Pneuma (2010)
- The Probable Flight Path of AF447 (2010)
- Around the World (2010)
- Dust (2009)
- Early Media goes to the Movies (2008)
- Hypnica (2007)
- Rome to Tripoli (2006–2008)
- A Light Rain (2004) in collaboration with Rebecca Cummins.
- Firebirds (2004) uses fire and water to create the sounds of music and language.
- Tongues of Fire (2004)
- (Tommy Franks) Dérive Quebec (2003)
- Rebus (2003)
- Wavescape (2003)
- According to Scripture (2002)
- Moondust Memories (2001)
- Walls in the Air (2001)
- The Products of Our Industry (2000)
- Four Foxhole Radios (2000)
- The Lecture of Comrade Stalin... (1999–2002)
- RainDance / Musica Acuatica (1998)
- The Messenger (1998–2006) examines the myths of electricity in communication. Involves three telegraphic receivers and is inspired by forgotten Catalan scientist Francesc Salvà i Campillo.
- Grind Snaxe Blind Apes (A Study for Pomeroy's Tomb) (1997)
- Living with Electricity (1997)
- Sound Waves and Scan-O-Vision (1996)
- Gray Matter (1995) uses the interaction of flesh and electricity to make music.
- Chaotic Jumpropes (1994)
- The Edison Effect (1989–1996) uses optics and computers to make new sounds by scanning ancient phonograph records with lasers.
- An Unsettling Matter (1991)
- Fireflies Alight on the Abacus of Al-Farabi (1989)
- Alien Voices (1988)
- Voice Creatures (1986)
- Music Room / Faultless Jamming (1982)
- Sound Fountain (1982) In collaboration with David Behrman
- Sounds and the Shadows of Sounds (1979)
- A Byte at the Opera (1977) a performance with Jim Pomeroy at Los Angeles Institute of Contemporary Art and at 80 Langton Street (San Francisco), involved sheetrock, dried beans, loudspeakers, colored chalk dust, silly string, power tools, Kim-1 microcomputer and digital port drivers.
- The Pygmy Gamelan (1973)

== Discography ==
Year	Album title	Artist	Publisher	Notes
1995	The Edison Effect: A Listener's Companion	Paul DeMarinis	Apollo Records with Het Apollohuis	Compact Disc (Holland), features 22 tracks.
1991	Music as a Second Language	Paul DeMarinis	Lovely Music, Ltd	CD 3011, features 8 tracks.
1989	Tellus #22, False Phonemes	Various artists	Tellus Audio Cassette Magazine with Harvetsworks Inc.	Mind Power (song track 6)
1988	Another Coast (New Works from the West)"	Various artists	Music & Arts Programs of America	CD 276, I Want You (song track 4) and Kokole (song track 5)
1985	Tellus #9, Music with Memory	Various artists	Tellus Audio Cassette Magazine with Harvetsworks Inc.	Eenie Meenie Chillie Beenie (song track 6) and Yellow Yankee (song track 7)
1981	She's-a-Wild	She's-a-Wild	Record Records	RR 101, recorded at Center For Contemporary Music at Mills College. Written by, Composed by, Produced by, Performed by Paul DeMarinis with Anne Klingensmith, David Behrman, and Eva-Tone.
1980	Lovely Little Records	Various artists	Lovely Music, Ltd	LP 101-6, Paul DeMarinis on tracks If God Were Alive (& He Is) You Could Reach Him by Telephone and Forest Booties.
1979	Just For The Record	"Blue" Gene Tyranny	Lovely Music, Ltd	LP 1062, Paul DeMarinis on track "Great Masters Of Melody"
