= Pat Oleszko =

American visual and performing artist

- Born: 1947 (age 78–79)
- Education: University of Michigan
- Occupations: Visual and performing artist

Pat Oleszko (born Patricia Oleszko; 1947) is an American visual and performing artist. Oleszko has performed at major New York institutions including the Whitney Museum of American Art, the Museum of Modern Art, MoMA P.S. 1, and P.S. 122. In 1990, the artist was awarded the prestigious Guggenheim Foundation fellowship, and in 2026 she received the $100,000 Bucksbaum Award.

== Early life and education ==
Oleszko is from Detroit, Michigan. Her dad was a chemical engineer and an inventor and, her mother an arts aficionado.

In 1970, she earned a Bachelor of Fine Arts degree from the University of Michigan in Ann Arbor.

== Work and life ==
Oleszko has spent much of her life as an artist working and living in New York City. She has attracted attention across a wide range of cultural publications, such as Artforum, Playboy, and Sesame Street Magazine. She has appeared on the cover of Ms. Magazine and had a striptease spread in Esquire.

The artist recalls being a frequent partygoer at Studio 54 and the Mudd Club in her 30s.

In 1976, she was artist-in-residence at Artpark, Lewiston, New York.

Of her early vocation and career as a performance art, she states:

"There wasn’t a term for “performance art” at the time, so one of my teachers came up with the idea that I could use my costumes as illustrations. That’s how I ended up in Ms. magazine. I wore an eight-and-a-half-foot-tall Statue of Liberty costume to the Easter Parade in New York City, and Kirsten came along with me. It was a hit."

Much of the artists output has been large-scale and eccentric works. Some under this rubric are The Wizard of Oz's Wicked Witch's feet sticking out from a cabin, a rocket ship well over 50-feet, Rudolph's red nose operated by the artist dressed as a Christmas tree, a crocodile devouring a human-like American flag, phallic sculptures, and critical political caricatures.

In her 1990 performance Nora's Art, she dramatically appeared from between the legs of a giant inflatable woman, now exhibited at David Peter Francis. Another performance, Bluebeard’s Hassle: The Writhes of the Wives (1989), was inspired by research on a serial killer and the seven deadly sins, featuring inflatables like Udder Delight that blossomed on stage like flowers.

In 2022, Oleszko was in a group show at JTT gallery on the Lower East Side.

In 2024, Oleszko had her first major solo show in New York since 1990, at David Peter Francis in Chinatown. The show included costumes, videos, archival material, a giant inflatable, and a “coat of arms” in honor of the 50th anniversary of the Surrealist Manifesto. Later that year she performed at “The Future is For/Boating” an intervention on the Staten Island Ferry. The performance included artists Amando Houser, Alex Tatarsky, and Abby Lloyd.

From January 29–April 27, 2026, the SculptureCenter exhibited Pat Oleszko: Fool Disclosure, her first solo exhibition at a New York City institution in over 35 years.

Themes in her work include wearable and inflatable sculpture and costume, video, satire, camp, and humiliation, cabaret and activism. Her influences include Flann O’Brien, Niki de Saint Phalle, Buster Keaton, Lewis Carroll, Dadaism, and the Bauhaus. Artist Carri Skoczek is a frequent collaborator.

In July 2026, Oleszko received the $100,000 Bucksbaum Award from the Whitney Museum of American Art for her five-decade long career for her work and use of humor in handcrafted art works (often inflatable) that deal with political issues, labor, gender and the environment. Upon receiving the award, the Whitney director stated that “Pat Oleszko is a singular force in American art, who has delighted, inspired, and challenged her audiences for half a century”.
