= Michel Longtin =

Canadian composer and music educator

Michel Longtin (born 20 May 1946) is a Canadian composer and music educator based in Montreal. An associate of the Canadian Music Centre and a member of the Canadian League of Composers, he won the Jules Léger Prize for New Chamber Music in 1986 for Pohjatuuli.

== Early life and education ==
Longtin was born in Montreal, Quebec. He studied theatre arts, earning a Bachelor of Arts from the Collège des Eudistes in 1967. During the summers of 1963-1964 he also studied theatre at the Banff School of Fine Arts. He then pursued studies in computer science, stage directing, and music at the Université de Montréal (UM) from 1968 to 1973, ultimately earning a Bachelor of Music in composition. His mentor at the school was composer André Prévost. In the summer of 1971 he studied for a short time with Samuel Dolin at The Royal Conservatory of Music. That year he won a BMI Student Composer Award. He continued studies in the graduate composition program at the UM with Prévost and Serge Garant, earning a Master of Music in 1975 and a Doctor of Music in 1982.

== Career ==
Longtin's early compositions were mainly electronic music. From 1971 to 1975 Longtin worked at the electronic music studio of McGill University with Paul Pedersen, Bengt Hambraeus, and Alcides Lanza. While studying at the University of Montreal he also con-currently worked on the music faculty of the UM from 1973 to 2008, teaching composition.

In 1988 Longtin's compositions were performed by the Nouvel Ensemble Moderne in Montreal. In 1995 his commissioned composition "Sursolitudes" was performed by the Montreal ensemble I Musici in Buffalo, New York. His work has also been commissioned and performed by the Orchestre symphonique de Montréal.
