= Relâche (musical group) =

US musical ensemble

Relâche is an American chamber ensemble dedicated to the performance of contemporary classical music.

Based in Philadelphia, Pennsylvania, the group was formed as a composer-performer collective by Joseph Franklin and Joseph Showalter in 1977 and officially granted not-for-profit status in 1979.

Its name means, "No performance," or "The theater is dark." It references a 1924 Dada theatrical play and the events surrounding its performance(s).

Joseph Franklin served as executive and artistic director from 1977 until 1998. Under his leadership, Relâche evolved into a producing/presenting organization in the service of the performing entity, The Relâche Ensemble.

Among the national and international projects that have been created and presented by Relâche are the 1987 New Music America Festival and Music in Motion, a six-year national residency program created in collaboration with the Atlantic Center for the Arts and designed to expand audiences for new American music through the creation of new musical works in a broad context of public outreach activities.

The octet has released several LPs and six CDs. Their 1997 album Pick It Up was nominated for a Grammy Award. Other releases include Relâche on Edge (1991), Outcome Inevitable (1994), Press Play (2006), Eight Point Turn (2008), and The Planets (2010).

The ensemble has toured around the world and has commissioned works from 150 composers, including John Cage, Robert Ashley, Kitty Brazelton, Uri Caine, Paul A. Epstein, Jennifer Margaret Barker, Fred Frith, Kyle Gann, Philip Glass, Fred Ho, Michael Nyman, Pauline Oliveros, Bobby Previte, George Russell, Somei Satoh, and Lois V Vierk. They have historically (though not exclusively) favored experimental music and the American "downtown" repertoire (as opposed to the dissonant music composed at the "uptown" conservatories), often incorporating improvisation and multimedia into their performances.

Relâche also has an open submission policy, meaning that composers are encouraged to send in unsolicited scores. The group has provided a unique challenge to composers because of its atypical instrumentation of flute/piccolo, oboe/English horn, clarinet/saxophone, bassoon, piano/synthesizer, percussion, viola, and double bass.

== Composers recorded ==
- Paul A. Epstein's Chamber Music: Three Songs from Home
- Thomas Albert's A Maze (with Grace) and Devil's Rain
- Kyle Gann
- Arturo Marquez
- Michael Nyman
- Stephen Montague
