= Joel Chadabe =

American composer (1938–2021)

Joel Chadabe (December 12, 1938 – May 2, 2021) was an American composer and author. He was a pioneer in the development of interactive music.

== Early life ==
Chadabe was born in the Bronx on December 12, 1938, to Solon Chadabe, a lawyer, and Sylvia Chadabe (née Cohen), a homemaker. Joel attended grade school at the Bentley School in Manhattan, where he studied piano, and later graduated from the University of North Carolina at Chapel Hill in 1959 with a degree in music, despite his parents' desire for him to become a lawyer. Chadabe then continued his education at Yale University under Elliott Carter, graduating in 1962 with a master's degree in music.

== Career ==
Upon completing his education at Yale, Chadabe and Carter traveled to Rome, where they continued their professional relationship. Chadabe was interested in studying jazz and opera, but ultimately accepted an offer from the State University of New York at Albany to direct its electronic music studio in 1965. He and Robert Moog designed the CEMS (Coordinated Electronic Music System), a Moog modular "super synthesizer" housed at the electronic music studios at Albany which incorporated an early digital sequencer, and he later acquired a Synclavier digital synthesizer for the university.

He was the president of Intelligent Music from 1983 to 1994, and founded the Electronic Music Foundation in 1994. Chadabe was the curator at New York sound gallery Engine 27 in 2000–01. He was given a SEAMUS Lifetime Achievement Award in 2007.

After retiring from his position at Albany in the late 1990s, Chadabe continued teaching as an adjunct at the Manhattan School of Music, New York University, and Bennington College.

His students include Liz Phillips, Richard Lainhart, and David A. Jaffe.

Chadabe died of periampullary cancer at his home in Albany on May 2, 2021.

== Bibliography ==
- Chadabe, Joel (1997). Electric Sound: The Past and Promise of Electronic Music. ISBN 978-0-13-303231-4.
- Chadabe, Joel (1975). "The Voltage-controlled Synthesizer", The Development and Practice of Electronic Music (Jon H. Appleton and Ronald Perera, eds.). ISBN 978-0-13-207605-0.
- Joel Chadabe (2005). "iFiddle Therefore I Am..." ACO.

== Discography ==
- After Some Songs (1995). Deep Listening CD 001.
