= Earl Howard =

American classical composer

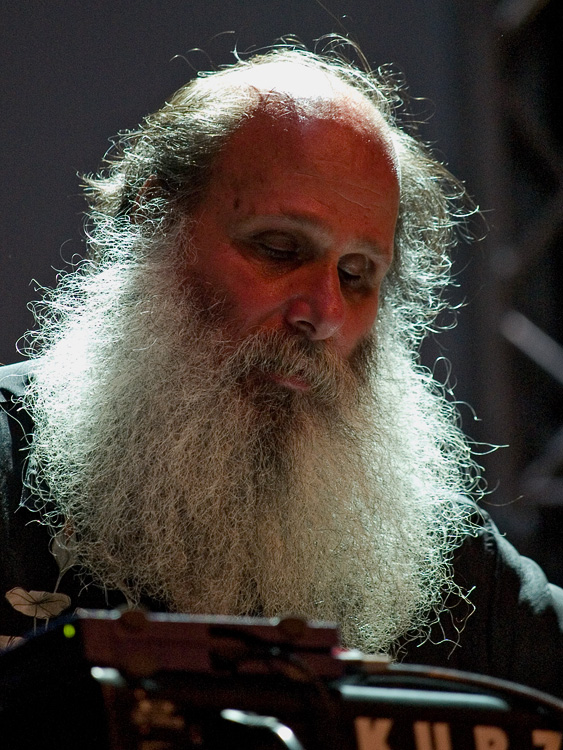
Earl Howard, at Moers Festival 2007

Earl Howard (born 1951) is an American avant-garde composer, arranger, saxophonist, synthesizer player and multi-instrumentalist.

Howard is one of the pioneers of what is called "new" music. He has been in the industry for over thirty years. Howard has performed with Anthony Davis, Gerry Hemingway, Georg Graewe, Mari Kimura, Mark Dresser, Yuko Fujiyama, Evan Parker, Thomas Buckner, George Lewis (trombonist) and many of the other most prominent musicians in his field.

Howard has received numerous awards including, a grant from Harvard's the Fromm Foundation, a Regents Fellowship at University of California, San Diego, and three New York Foundation for the Arts Fellowships. In 2004 Howard's first sound installation was commissioned for the Tiffany Collection at the Queens Museum of Art.

Earl Howard has also produced soundtracks for some major film and video artists including Nam June Paik, Mary Lucier, Rii Kanzaki, Bob Harris, and Bill Brand.

== Biography ==
Earl Howard was born January 12, 1951, in Los Angeles, California. He was one of the smallest babies at the time to survive birth and lost his sight before leaving the hospital. Howard graduated from California Institute of the Arts in Music Composition in 1974. Earl Howard lives in New York City and is married to the installation artist Liz Phillips who is famous for her interactive sound sculpture.

== Discography ==
- Granular Modality (New World Records, 2012) - Earl Howard (alto saxophone, synthesizer, live processing) & Miya Masaoka (koto)
- Clepton (New World Records, 2007) - 1. Clepton (2006) Earl Howard, synthesizer, live processing; Georg Grawe, piano; Ernst Reijseger, cello; Gerry Hemingway, drums 38:01 2. Improvisation (2006) Earl Howard, synthesizer, live processing; Georg Grawe, piano; Ernst Reijseger, cello; Gerry Hemingway, drums 06:02 3. Rosebud (1989) Earl Howard, synthesizer; Gerry Gemingway, drums 14:54
- 5 Saxophone Solos (Mutablemusic, 2005) - 5 Saxophone Solos 63:13
- Strong Force (Mutablemusic, 2003) - Concert recorded at Merkin Hall with Howard on synth, Anthony Davis on piano, Gerry Hemingway on percussion, Anne LeBaron on harp and Ernst Reijseger on cello. 1. 17:01 2. 11:34 3. 12:41 4. 4:55 5. 04:57
- Fire Song (Erstwhile, 2000) - Denman Maroney on piano, Howard on saxophone and synth. 1. Firesong 17:48 2. Uncaged Bacchanal 10:23 3. Pulse Field 13:22 4. Orchid 12:12
- Pele's Tears (Random Acoustics, 1994) - Compilation of works from 1986 to 1993. First two tracks are solos by Howard on a Serge synthesizer or Serge Modular System and an AKAI S 1000, a LEXICON PCM 70 and a LXP. These are followed by a quartet with Howard on electronics, Frank Gratozski on alto sax, Pelvyn Poore on tuba and Hans Schneider on double bass. 1. Hell 19:25 2. Pele's Tears 17:59 3. Bottle 13:06 4. Quartet1 05:25 5. Quartet2 05:37
