= Jon Deak =

American classical composer

Jon Deak (born April 27, 1943) is an American composer, contrabassist and education specialist. He is a former associate principal bassist of the New York Philharmonic, a position he held from 1973 to 2009 after joining the philharmonic in 1969 under Leonard Bernstein, and a prominent contemporary composer of orchestral and chamber works. He currently serves as the young composers advocate of the New York Philharmonic, where he founded the award-winning Very Young Composers Program in 1995.

== Early life ==
Jon Deak was born in Hammond, Indiana and grew up in an artistic environment in Oak Park, Illinois, where he attended Oak Park and River Forest High School, playing in the orchestra under Harold Little and The Deuces dance band. His father and mother were sculptors and painters from Eastern Europe; he himself has worked in sculpture and was active in the "performance art" movement in New York's Soho district. He attended Oberlin College, The Juilliard School, the University of Illinois, and the Conservatorio di Santa Cecilia in Rome as a Fulbright scholar.

== Career ==
Deak's compositions have been performed at music festivals worldwide and by orchestras including the New York Philharmonic, National Symphony Orchestra, Minnesota Orchestra, Cincinnati Symphony, Seattle Symphony, New Jersey Symphony Orchestra, Atlanta Symphony, Colorado Symphony Orchestra, Rochester Philharmonic and major chamber groups around the country. His Concerto for Double Bass and Orchestra (Jack and the Beanstalk) was nominated for the 1990 Pulitzer Prize by the National Symphony. His compositions have been recorded by Centaur, CRI, Innova, and Cabrillo records.

Deak founded The Very Young Composers Program in one school in Denver, and has rapidly expanded it to an international program found in multiple public schools in New York City, seven cities across the US, and seven foreign countries throughout the world, as well as developing a follow-up curriculum in New York City called The Bridge.

He has performed throughout the world, including joining the International Orchestra formed by Leonard Bernstein in 1989 as the Berlin wall was coming down. Currently he travels the world as Very Young Composers education specialist developing project with El Sistema in Venezuela and education organizations in Finland, South Korea, Japan, Norway, and other countries.

== Personal life ==
Deak lives in New York City with his family including his children Nicky, Forrest, Selena, and Alex. He is an outspoken environmental advocate and wilderness mountaineer who has led climbing expeditions into the Canadian Rockies, Alaska, and the Himalayas.
