= Jim Pomeroy (artist) =

American artist (1945–1992)

- Born: March 21, 1945
- Died: April 6, 1992 (aged 47)
- Other name: James C. Pomeroy
- Occupation: artist

James C. Pomeroy (March 21, 1945, in Reading, Pennsylvania – April 6, 1992, in Arlington, Texas) was an American artist whose practice spanned a variety of media including performance art, sound art, photography, installation art, sculpture, and video art.

== Early life and education ==
Jim Pomeroy was born on March 21, 1945, in Reading, Pennsylvania. The family moved to a small town in Texas when he was three, and then to Montana when he was sixteen. Pomeroy developed an early interest in model airplanes and electrical machines, and his science-related interests were encouraged in high school.

Pomeroy went to the University of Texas, Austin, initially planning to go into physics but discovering that he wasn't very good at it. He switched his major to art and studied stone sculpture, ceramics, and painting for five years, leaving with a B.A. in 1968. He began working in an Abstract Expressionist style before migrating to Minimalism and Conceptualism and bringing industrial processes, materials, and methods into his work. Under the influence of artists like Robert Smithson, Donald Judd, and Tony Smith, he left Texas in 1968 and moved to the San Francisco Bay Area. He received his M.A. (1971) and M.F.A. (1972) in art from the University of California at Berkeley. Pomery was a Founding Member/Vice President of 80 Langdon St, now New Langdon Arts, a non profit Gallery in San Francisco in 1976. He is the recipient of an NEA grant (1976, 1983) and was the Chair of the Sculpture Department at the SF Art Institute from 1977 - 1979. He was on the editorial board of "exposure" magazine and the advisory board of CEPA among many more leadership roles.

== Career ==
In the 1970s and 1980s, Pomeroy was a prominent figure in the performance art and installation activity associated with Bay Area conceptual art. He disliked the rigid separations between media maintained by most art schools and referred to himself as a "general practitioner" and is now considered a pioneer in the field of new media art, developing an anti-spectacular, witty aesthetic that fed on his lifelong interest in popular mechanics, informal science experiments, garage invention, and home-brewed technology. Among his friends and collaborators are such artists as Perry Hoberman, Paul Kos, and Paul DeMarinis and the curator Suzanne Foley. DeMarinis describes him as a quintessential artist-tinkerer, one of a generation of artists who, growing up in the era of the first space program, "had been inculcated with the codes of science and technology, but who had reterritorialized them to identify technology with culture." Two of his best-known pieces of the mid 1970s, Mozart's Moog and Fear Elites, used music-box mechanisms to raise questions about the role of the human performer in an era of increasingly automated and synthetic forms of music production. Other works, such as Newt Ascending Astaire's Face and Turbo Pan, are partly inspired by 19th century technologies such as the zoetrope. He also created a pair of works, Composition in Deep/Light at the Opera and Clear Bulbs Cast Sharp Shadows, based on 3D technology of the period and requiring anaglyphic (red-green) glasses for viewing.

Pomeroy co-founded the artist-run space 80 Langton Street (later renamed New Langton Arts) in San Francisco. In 1999, on the occasion of New Langton Arts's 25th anniversary, the space organized a posthumous Jim Pomeroy retrospective, catalogue, and website. He also exhibited and performed at numerous museums and galleries around the United States, including the California Museum of Photography in Riverside, the San Jose Museum of Art (California), the Dallas Museum of Art (Texas), the Walker Art Center (Minnesota), and the Albright-Knox Gallery (New York). He published essays in a number of art magazines, including Afterimage and High Performance. At the same time, he remained highly critical of the way in which the mainstream art world depended on—but often failed to credit—the work being done in alternative spaces like his. Most famously, for the San Francisco Museum of Modern Art's influential 1980 exhibition of conceptual and performance art entitled “Space/Time/Sound–1970’s: A Decade in the Bay Area", Pomeroy contributed a piece entitled Viewing the Museum: The Tale Wagging the Dog, consisting of his scathing article “Viewing the Museum: The Tale Wagging the Dog” (which had been commissioned by the Los Angeles Institute of Contemporary Art two years earlier), together with enlarged reproductions of his correspondence with exhibition curator Suzanne Foley pursuing further reflections on the subject.

Pomeroy was on the faculty of the San Francisco Art Institute for a while before moving on in 1987 to become a tenured faculty member in the Media Arts Department at the University of Texas, Arlington. When the desktop computer emerged towards the end of his life, he taught his students that computers were "as important a tool for an artist as a pencil or a camera."

Pomeroy died unexpectedly of an acute subdural hematoma two weeks after suffering a concussion from a fall. The Jim Pomeroy Archive is located at the Center for Creative Photography at the University of Arizona.

== Selected works ==
- Turbo Pan (ca. 1985) is an interactive sculpture consisting of cardboard mailing tubes of varying lengths mounted on the rim of a bicycle wheel. A vacuum cleaner with reversed air flow both causes the wheel to spin and plays the tubes as they pass by, creating a hybrid between "zoetrope, barrel organ, and Tibetan prayer wheel."
- Willikers in G (1980) is a sound-performance work in which Pomeroy would arrange large metal cans containing water over Bunsen burners. While performing a monologue, he would turn off the burners and cap the steam-filled cans, creating a vacuum that eventually caused the cans to buckle, the sounds of which were then picked up, processed, and amplified back to the audience.
- Fear Elites (1974) is a sound installation consisting of a framed, unwalled room built out of sheet-metal studs to which are affixed dozens of music-box mechanisms, each of which has been modified in some way. These adjustments turn the underlying melody, Beethoven's "Fur Elise," into a new composition playing inside the larger music box of the semi-raw space.
- Composition in D (ca. 1974) is a sound-performance work that involves firing slingshots at music boxes.
- Mozart's Moog (mid 1970s) is an interactive work that is also a kind of mechanical musical instrument. Inside a briefcase are 44 music-box movements mounted on a brushed-aluminum panel, with an array of knobs offering users control over the sounds produced. Built-in contact microphones create further transformations in the sound output.
- Back on the Ladder/The Beat Goes On is a sound-performance work consisting of an assemblage of ladder, vacuum cleaners, and flexible tubes filled with water. The vacuum cleaners are engineered to blow air across the tubes, creating a plastic pipe organ effect that is altered in performance by valves that are opened or closed to move the water around the tubes.
- Newt Ascending Astaire's Face is a large zoetrope whose animation shows a silhouette of a newt crawling upwards over the smiling face of dancer Fred Astaire. The punning title references Marcel Duchamp's famous painting Nude Descending a Staircase.

== Selected writings ==
- Rushmore –Another Look: Surveying the American icon: Celebrating America's bicentennial. San Francisco Art Institute: San Francisco, 1976.
- Notes on Music, Stereography, and Performance, Jim Pomeroy: San Francisco, 1980.
- Light at the Opera/Composition in Deep, High Performance #17–18, Spring–Summer 1982
- APOLLO JEST: An American Mythology (in Depth). Blind Snake Blues Press: San Francisco, 1983.
- Like a Razor Blade to a Razor Blade Company: Technology, Profit, and the Friendly User at the Cutting Edge, Afterimage, April 1984
- Stereo Views. Light Work: Syracuse, 1988.
- Black Box S-Thetix: Labor, Research and Survival in the He[art] of the Beast, Technoculture, Constance Penley and Andrew Ross, eds. University of Minnesota Press, Spring 1991.

== Selected bibliography ==
- Alpert, Richard. South of the Slot, October – November 1974. Richard Alpert: San Francisco, 1974.
- Roth, Moira. Toward A History of California Performance, ARTS, 1978.
- Rickey, Carrie. Jim Pomeroy at Artists Space, Artforum, 1979.
- Foley, Suzanne. Space Time Sound, Conceptual Art in the San Francisco Bay Area: The 1970s. San Francisco: San Francisco Museum of Modern Art, 1981. ISBN 0-295-95879-0
- Krane, Susan, ed.Jim Pomeroy, 3-D photos: January 9–January 31, 1981. CEPA Gallery, Buffalo, New York, 1981. ISBN 0-914782-37-1
- Jan, Alfred. Jim Pomeroy: Winner of Our Dis-content, High Performance #35, 1986.
- Tamblyn, Christine. Machine Dreams, Afterimage, 1988.
- Montano, Linda. Performance Artists Talking in the Eighties. Berkeley: University of California Press, 2000. ISBN 978-0-520-21022-6
- Druckery, Timothy and Nadine Lemmon, ed. For a Burning World Is Come to Dance Inane: Essays by and about Jim Pomeroy. Critical Press, 1993
- Miller, Susan and Paul DeMarinis, eds. Jim Pomeroy: A Retrospective, New Langton Arts, San Francisco, 1999. ISBN 0-9627010-2-5
- Di Rosa, Rene, ed. Local Color: The di Rosa Collection of Contemporary California Art, Chronicle Books: San Francisco, 1999. ISBN 0-8118-2376-8
- Schimmel, Paul and Lisa Gabrielle Mark, eds. Under the Big Black Sun: California Art 1974–1981. Prestel US, 2011. ISBN 3-7913-5139-7
