= Minneapolis Guitar Quartet =

American guitar ensemble

The Minneapolis Guitar Quartet, founded in 1986, is a guitar ensemble. When the group was founded, guitar quartets were uncommon, and so the group commissioned new music for their repertoire.

The group has undergone numerous personnel changes. Members of the group have included Joseph Hagedorn, O. Nicholas Raths, Jeff Lambert, Steven Newbrough, Ben Gateno, and Jeffrey Thygeson.
