= Gordon Monahan =

Canadian pianist and composer

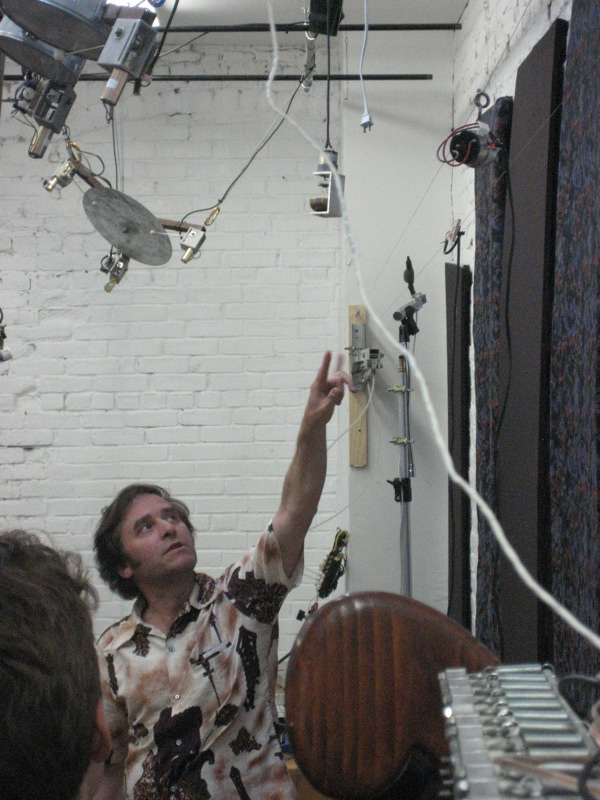
- Born: 1956 (age 68–69); Kingston, Ontario
- Occupation(s): Artist, musician
- Known for: Sound artist, sound sculptor
- Notable work: Speaker Swinging
- Website: www.gordonmonahan.com

Gordon Monahan (born 1956 in Kingston, Ontario) is a Canadian pianist and composer of experimental music. He has been active since at least 1978. Along with his own work, he has performed works by other composers such as John Cage, James Tenney, Udo Kasemets and Roberto Paci Dalò. He has also created site-specific sound installations. In 1992-93 he was artist-in-residence with the DAAD in Berlin where he lived until 2006.

== Life and career ==
Gordon Monahan was born on June 1, 1956 in Kingston, Ontario. He originally was interested in a being a physicist and studied physics at the University of Ottawa from 1974-1976. He transferred to Mount Allison University where he graduated with a Bachelor of Arts in Music in 1980 after four years of study. There his teachers included Janet Hammock (piano) and Michael R. Miller (composition). After graduating he lived in Toronto for seven years, and then moved to New York City in 1987.

== Awards ==
Monahan won first prize at the 1984 CBC National Radio Competition for Young Composers. He is one of six Laureates to receive Governor General's Awards for Visual and Media Arts in 2013.

- 2016: Sound Artist of the City of Bonn, Germany.

== Notable works ==
- Piano Mechanics (1981-1986)
- Speaker Swinging (1982)
- Piano Mechanics (1982)
- Long Aeolian Piano (1984/88)
- Music From Nowhere (1989)
- Aquaeolian Whirlpool (1990)
- Spontaneously Harmonious in Certain Kinds of Weather (1996)
- Multiple Machine Matrix (1994-8)
- Theremin in the Rain (2003)
- Theremin Pendulum (2008)
- Resonant Platinum Records (2011/12, Soundinstallation at Singuhr Hörgalerie, Berlin).

== Literature ==
Linda Jansma and Carsten Seiffarth (Eds.): Gordon Monahan: Seeing Sound, Sound Art, Performance and Music, 1978-2011, 159 pages plus DVD. Toronto : Doris McCarthy Gallery [et al.], 2011 (Exhibition Catalogue), ISBN 978-1926589091
