= Thomas Albert (composer) =

American composer and educator (born 1948)

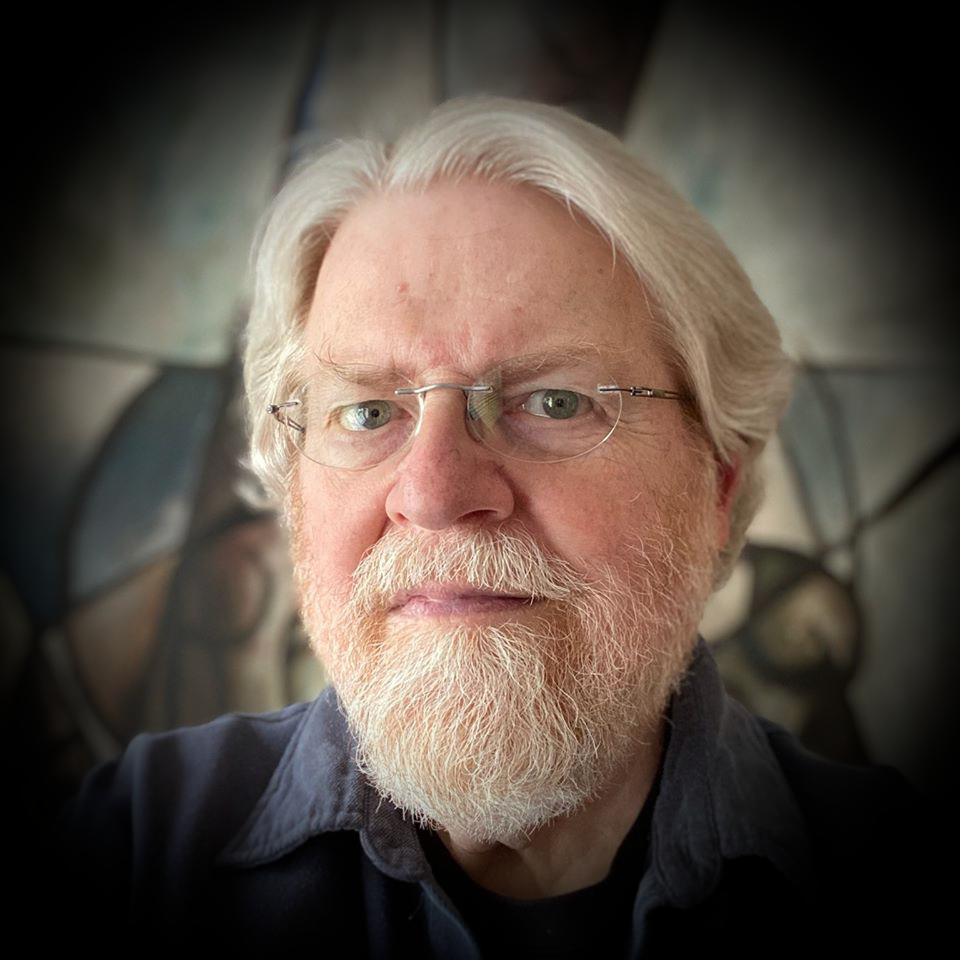
- Born: December 14, 1948 (age 77); Lebanon, Pennsylvania, U.S.
- Occupation: Composer
- Website: www.thomasalbert.net

Thomas Albert (born December 14, 1948) is an American composer and educator. He attended the public schools of Lebanon, Pennsylvania and Wilson, North Carolina. In 1970, he received the degree A.B. (magna cum laude) from Atlantic Christian College (now Barton College). He received the M.Mus. (1972) and D.M.A. (1974) in composition from the University of Illinois at Urbana-Champaign.

He is a faculty member of Shenandoah Conservatory at Shenandoah University as a professor of music (composition and musical theatre) and Harold Herman Chair in Musical Theatre. During his tenure, he served as the conductor and music director of more than 100 musicals and revues. From 1989 to 2004 he was associate dean of the Conservatory; from 2004 to 2008, he was chair of the Theatre Division. He was a music director for Shenandoah Summer Music Theatre from 1984 to 2019. From 2015 to 2019, he was the producing artistic director of Shenandoah Summer Music Theatre. He is currently professor emeritus, Composition and Musical Theatre.

His best-known composition is Thirteen Ways, commissioned by eighth blackbird. The piece was inspired by Wallace Stevens’ poem, "Thirteen Ways of Looking at a Blackbird", from which the ensemble derived its name, It is the title work of eighth blackbird’s first commercial recording, Thirteen Ways (Cedille Records).
