= New Music America =

- Genre: Experimental music, contemporary classical music
- Locations: United States; Montreal
- Years active: 1979 to 1990

New Music America was a nomadic American festival (held in Montreal during its last year) showcasing at its origins New York City's Downtown Music, but growing into one of the largest new music festivals ever held in North America, all in an attempt to try to bring out of the popular shadows the breadth and history of 20th Century composition and creation, as well as current trends. From 1979 to 1990, each New Music America (officially bilingualized into Montréal Musiques Actuelles in 1990) had a wealth of local, regional, national and world premieres, adding to its scope some music from around the world by the time of the Miami festival.

== History ==
The original conference, named New Music New York, with concordant (and demonstrative) concerts was held at The Kitchen in New York City in 1979. One of the themes there was to break down barriers created by the segregation of genres, and breaking music journalist/critic-driven pigeonholing.

The 12 years of the festival's existence was marked by over 750 performances, exhibits, workshops, installations, and artistic inventions, each festival supplanting the previous in size, expanding its diversity and many bringing "new" music to everywhere conceivable in the United States.

Impressed by the breadth (and probably fun) of the NMNY, the Walker Arts Center in Minneapolis wanted to replicate the experience and held a similar festival a year later, this time named New Music America. Most likely it was at this time that a loose coalition of national administrators and musicians became the New Music Alliance with the task of recreating New Music America in a different city every year, allowing for composers and performers to be seen in their own region while giving a greater exposure to music creators ignored both nationally and historically, such as John Cage, Morton Feldman, Lou Harrison, Pauline Oliveros, Terry Riley, Philip Glass, Rhys Chatham, and Earle Brown, but not Milton Babbitt, the composer whose 1958 essay "Who Cares if you Listen?" created a cold war between the public's desire for new sounds and the modernist composer's desire to sound new.

San Francisco followed in 1981, Chicago in 1982, Washington, D.C., in 1983, Hartford, Connecticut in 1984, Los Angeles in 1985, Houston in 1986, Philadelphia in 1987, Miami in 1988, returning to New York in 1989 and ending in Montreal in 1990.

The festival always had workshop components and provided many points of contact between often a curious public and new musical creation. But as a self-propelled machine, it kept growing to try to "represent" the vastly growing varieties of expression taking birth with new technologies and reassessments of the general music culture, and to do so it had to grow financially as well.

Perhaps its greatest accomplishment was connecting large audiences (sometimes in the thousands) with works which critics, music industry reps and radio people all considered too serious, complex, weird or difficult. In addition, audience members were placed in a unique position of being among the musician's peers as the week-long length permitted performers to attend each other's concerts or events.

Though it was always a 10-day festival more or less, the price for full admittance at Hartford was $20 and housing was provided on campus. By New York 1989, prices had grown to around $350 for full pass and at this point, only hotel accommodations were available. This wasn't always a bad thing as it coaxed many musicians to bunk with others who had similar tastes for new creation.

Money was the prime driver for its dissolution, as the Hartford festival was within a $300,000 - $400,000 range while the Montreal festival had projected over a million (Canadian) in costs. All festivals were considered great successes but took so much effort of coordination (and in some cases treaty-building between opposing music factions) that it acquired the Olympics paradox of being unable to reduce itself in size.

In 1992, the attempts to revive NMA resulted in New Music Across America, sort of an Avant-Garde World Music Day, hosting simultaneous music event days under a single banner.

== See also ==
- List of experimental music festivals
- List of contemporary classical music festivals
