= Michael Laucke discography and filmography =

Michael Laucke discography
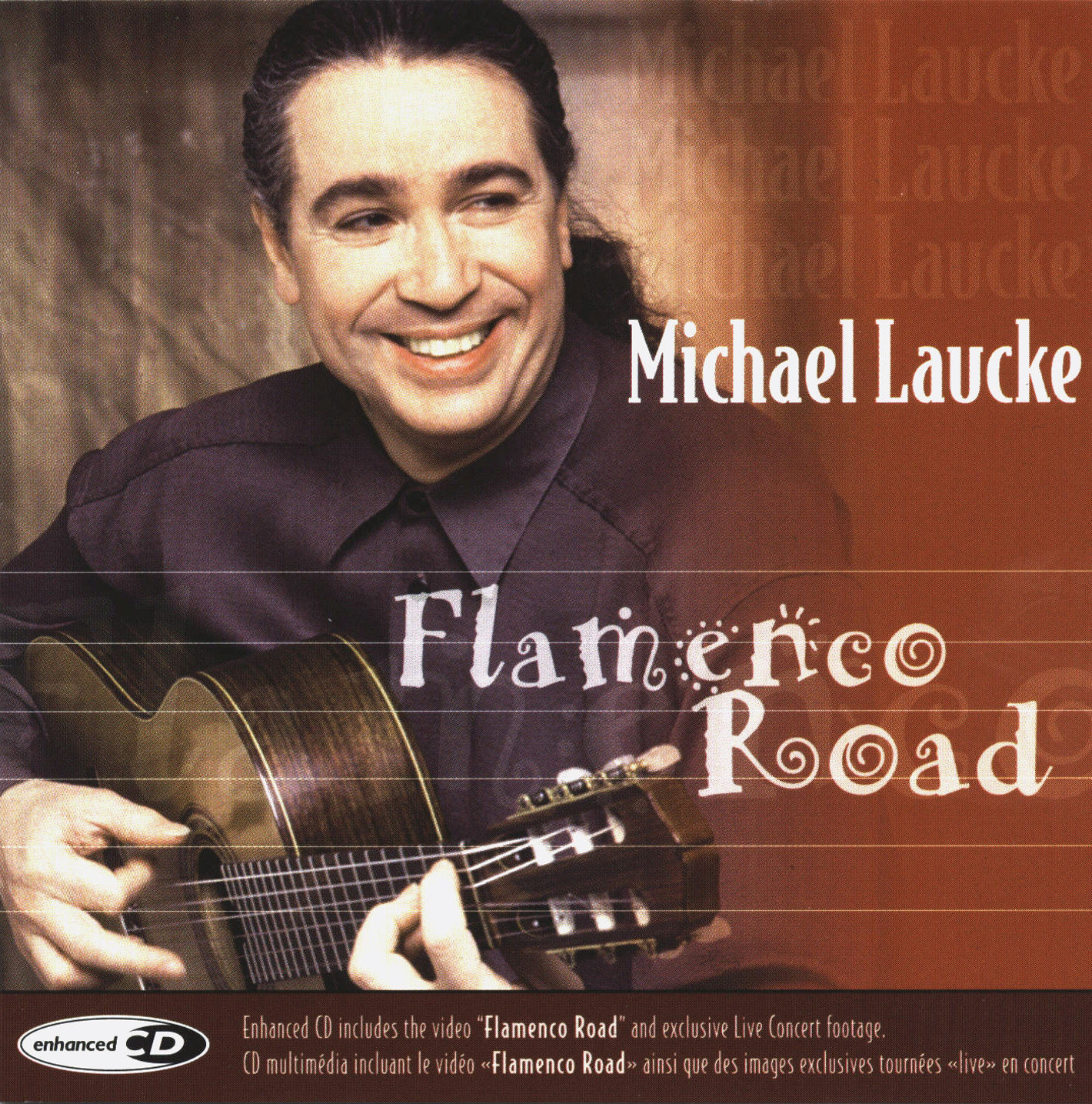
- Flamenco Road CD cover
- Studio albums: 15
- Live albums: 1
- Compilation albums: 3
- Video albums: 8
- Music videos: 6

Michael Laucke (29 January 1947 – 2 December 2021) is a Canadian classical, new flamenco, and flamenco guitarist, and a music industry entrepreneur. This page is dedicated to CDs, films and atonal works written for, dedicated to and recorded by Laucke.

Laucke has broadened the repertoire of the guitar with over 100 transcriptions and twenty-five Canadian composers have written atonal works for him, including a flamenco concierto for guitar with full symphonic orchestra. He has recorded sixteen albums and appeared in six films. His albums have won the Grand Prix du Disque for Best Canadian Recording, the Jules Léger Prize for New Chamber Music and his album Jade Eyes, for CBS records, was reviewed by Guitar and Lute magazine (Hawaii) as the best international classical guitar album of the year. He also created an instructional video series.

Laucke performed in the first IMAX HD film in 48 frames per second, a Super IMAX film called Momentum, produced by the National Film Board of Canada and co-directed by Colin Low. Its premiere took place in the Canadian pavilion during the Universal Exposition of Seville (Expo '92)‍—‌a world's fair. Laucke's CD Flamenco Road reached number one on video charts across Canada for five consecutive weeks. SOCAN's The Music Scene magazine considered Laucke to be one of "five of Canada's best-known soloists". Music critic emeritus, historian, and musician Eric McLean of the Montreal Gazette avowed, "Laucke is the person who has done more for the guitar in this country than anyone else." After 50 years of concert performances, Laucke continues an active career. In 2015, Laucke was nominated for the Order of Canada Lifetime Achievement Award, which is his country's second-highest civilian honour.

== Discography and filmography ==
=== CD ===
Title	Year	Label	Notes
Flamenco Road	2001	Justin-Time Records	...number one on video charts across Canada for five consecutive weeks
Michael Laucke & Fiesta Flamenco: Live	1996	DeMuzik Entertainment Group	...recorded live at Place des Arts, Montreal, Canada
Spanish Guitar	1993	METACOM	
Momentum – IMAX Film (the music)	1992	NFB Special Edition (National Film Board of Canada)	...shown in the Canadian pavilion during the Universal Exposition of Seville (Expo '92)‍—‌a world's fair. Co-directed by Colin Low, it is the first film in 48 frames/sec IMAX HD
Spanish Guitar Stories	1991	Intermede Communications	
Light Classics	1990	Intermede Communications	

=== LP ===
Title	Year	Label	Notes
Take A Short Cut	1989	Intermede Communications	
Canadian Guitar Music	1987	MLCO Records	
Music For Jacques Cartier	1986	RCI (Radio Canada International)	Commissioned by the Government of Canada
Canadian Guitar Quartet: Live From Montreal	1985	MLCO Records	
Com-Possession	1985	McGill University Records	Winner of Jules Léger Prize for New Chamber Music
Divergences	1984	RCI 583 (Radio Canada International)	
Jade Eyes	1980	CBS /Aquitaine	...best international classical guitar album of the year
Michael Laucke, Guitarist	1979	RCI 457 (Radio Canada International)	Grand Prix du Disque, Best Canadian recording
Trio 3	1979	RCI 497 (Radio Canada International)	Members Sayyd Abdul Al-Khabyyr, Pauline Vaillancourt and Michael Laucke
Transcription	1969	RCI 367 (Radio Canada International)	includes Départ and Iikkii by François Morel for Guitar and chamber orchestra

=== Filmography ===
Title	Year	Corporation	Producer
Momentum (IMAX film)	1992	NFB (National Film Board of Canada)	Mark Zannis
I Won't Dance	1991	LaGauchet Productions and Ciné Films Canada	Raymond Gravel
How to Play Solo Classical Guitar	1985	Rogers Educational Video Productions	Nick NotarAngelo
Michael Laucke: Guitar recital	1983	CBC Winnipeg, Canada (Canadian Broadcasting Corporation)	David Waters
Segovia: Metropolitan museum: a master class	1982	PBS (Public Broadcasting System) and Metropolitan Museum of Art, New York co-production	Nathan Kroll
Form & Fire: Michael Laucke	1981	Concordia University, Montreal	Robert Frank
Musique instrumentale: La guitare	1973	Radio-Québec	Robert Desrosiers

=== Atonal works written for Laucke ===
The following works have been performed by Laucke in Carnegie Hall (performing Jean Papineau-Couture), Wigmore Hall (Michel-Georges Brégent), and National Gallery of Art (Michel Gonneville). In Canada, the SMCQ honoured Laucke's contribution by featuring him in a two-hour-long concert.

Legend:

- RCI means Radio Canada International label
- MUR means McGill University label
- CBC means CBC recording in studio or in concert
- Date means date of record or CBC recording.

Date	Composer	Musical work	Instrumentation	Length
03/06/70, RCI 367	François Morel	Départ	Guitar and chamber orchestra	9'25
08/04/72, RCI 367	François Morel	Iikkii	Guitar and chamber orchestra	16'30
05/01/76, CBC	Claude Vivier	Pour Guitare	Guitar	5' Pour Guitare by Claude Vivier
05/01/76, CBC	Walter Boudreau	Le Cercle gnostique	Voice, flute, guitar (TRIO 3)	5'
02/25/79, RCI 457	François Morel	Me duele españa	Guitar	21' Me Duele Espana by Francois Morel
09/23/80, CBC	David Eagle	Contrastare no 1	Bass, flute, guitar	10'
10/26/81, CBC	Alan Crossman	La Fille du Pecheur	Voice, guitar	15'
03/05/81, CBC	Bruno Deschênes	Calme en soi	Guitar	8'
02/25/82, CBC	Claude Lassonde	Quatre études; Anachorétisme; Quatre mouvements; Image et Sonoritéé; Silène pur Satyre; La Règne	Guitar; Guitar; Guitar; Two guitars; Flute, guitar; Voice, flute, guitar (TRIO 3)	4'; 14'; 8'30; 4'20; 5'20; 15'30
04/16/82, CBC & MUR 09/28/83	John Rea (composer)	Com-possession	Guitar, string quartet	15'
04/28/83, CBC	John Burke	...ascends at full moon	Guitar, clarinet	15'
11/08/83, CBC	Jean Papineau-Couture	Exploration	Guitar	12'
01/14/83, CBC	Michel Gonneville	Le Sommeil, le Regard, le Choix	Guitar	21'
03/18/83, RCI 497	Wolfgang Bottenberg	Three Amerindian Songs, Prelude	Voice, flute, guitar (TRIO 3)	7'30
03/18/83, RCI 497	Michel-Georges Brégent	Sapho	Voice, flute, guitar (TRIO 3) Violin and guitar	15'9'
1983, RCI 583	François Morel	Divergences	Guitar, violin	8'30
1983, RCI 583	Denis Dion	Pas de deux	Guitar, violin	4'30
1983, RCI 583	Leon Zukert	Cobwebs in my Spanish castle	Guitar	7'
09/25/86, CBC	Donald Steven	Chamber Concierto for guitar	Guitar, 15 instruments	20'
1991, CBC	Michel-Georges Brégent	Concierto Flamenco	Guitar, orchestra (Montreal Symphony Orchestra)	20'

== See also ==
- List of classical guitarists
- List of flamenco guitarists
