= David Tanenbaum =

David Tanenbaum may refer to:

- David Tanenbaum (guitarist) (born 1956), American classical guitarist
- David M. Tanenbaum, American experimental physicist
