= Michael Laucke =

Canadian classical and flamenco guitarist (1947–2021)

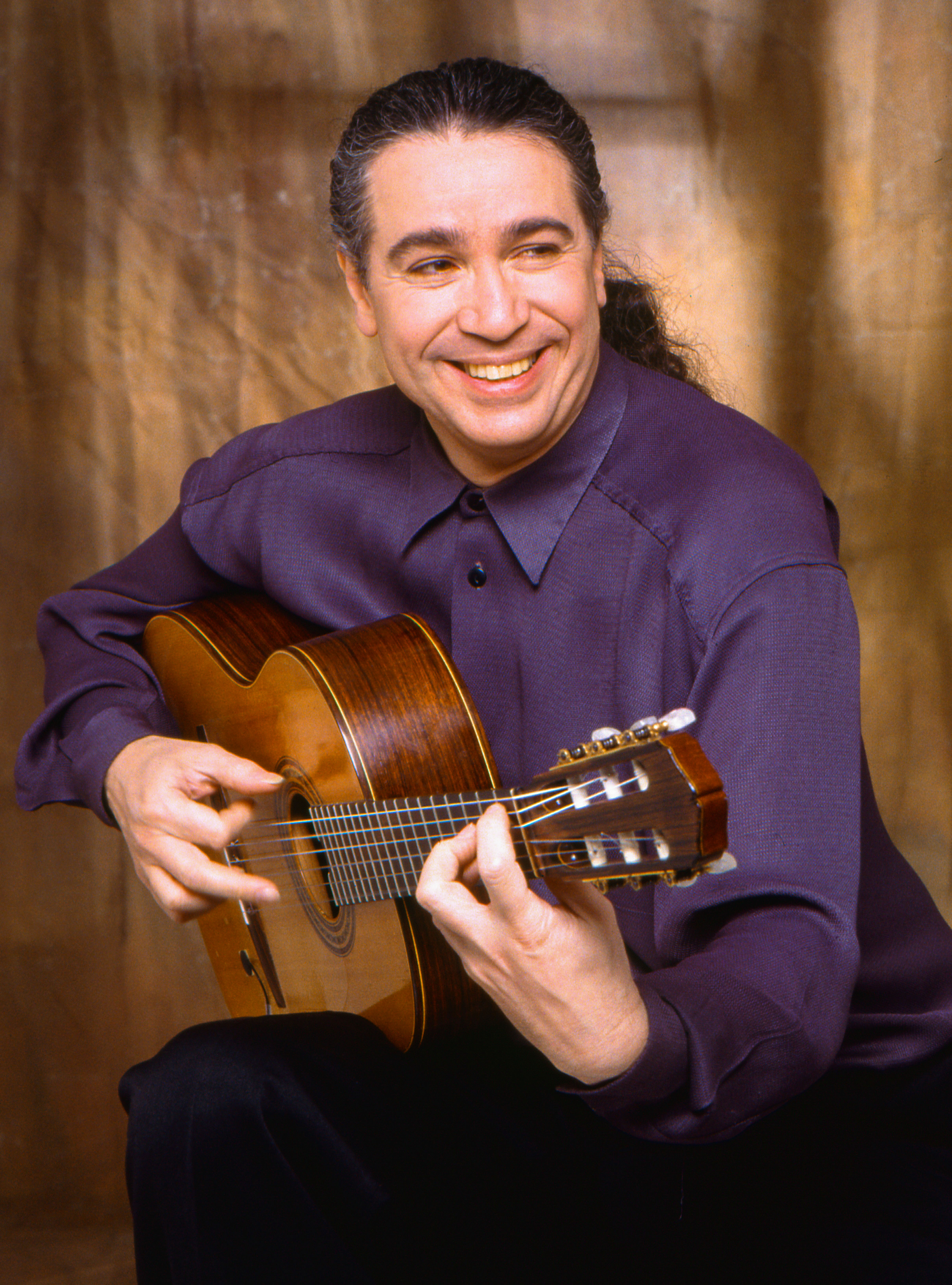
- Laucke in 2011

Background information
- Also known as: Young Mike
- Born: 29 January 1947; Montreal, Quebec, Canada
- Died: 2 December 2021 (aged 74) Montreal, Quebec, Canada
- Genres: Classical; flamenco; new flamenco
- Occupations: Musician; composer; music industry businessman; music producer
- Instrument: Classical guitar
- Years active: 1965–2015
- Labels: CBS/Aquitaine; DeMuzik; Intermède; Justin-Time; McGill University; METACOM; RCI
- Formerly of: The Flamenco Road Show; Michael Laucke & Fiesta Flamenco; TRIO 3
- Michael Laucke's voice Recorded 2 November 2015

Signature
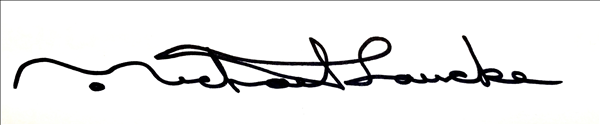

Michael Laucke (/ˈlɑːk/; 29 January 1947 – 2 December 2021) was a Canadian classical, new flamenco and flamenco guitarist and composer. Starting at the age of thirteen, Laucke gave professional snooker demonstrations and his winnings allowed him to take trips from Montreal to New York City to study the classical guitar with Rolando Valdés-Blain. With a career spanning over 30 years, Laucke began performing in 1965, recording the first of 16 albums in 1969, and toured in 25 countries. In 1971, he performed his first of many concerts at the National Gallery of Art in Washington, D.C. His first concert in New York, where he also first met Senator Claiborne Pell, took place in 1972.

Laucke was introduced to complex flamenco techniques by Spanish guitarist Paco de Lucía when the two shared a loft and performed together for the jet set in New York City in the early 1970s. In 1982 he was selected by Andrés Segovia to perform for the PBS network at the Metropolitan Museum of Art in New York City. Laucke subsequently became Segovia's pupil, and also studied with other classical guitar players, including Julian Bream and Alirio Díaz. He performed mainly on classical guitar until 1990; from then until has last performance in 2015, his concerts consisted exclusively of flamenco and new flamenco works.

Laucke broadened the guitar repertoire by creating over 100 transcriptions of classical and flamenco music. Several notable Canadian composers have written atonal works for him. SOCAN's The Music Scene magazine considered Laucke to be one of "five of Canada's best-known soloists". Music critic emeritus, historian, and musician Eric McLean of the Montreal Gazette avowed: "Laucke is the person who has done more for the guitar in this country than anyone else." He received many other awards and honours throughout his career, including the Grand Prix du Disque-Canada for Best Canadian Recording. He was also a music industry businessman.

== Early life ==
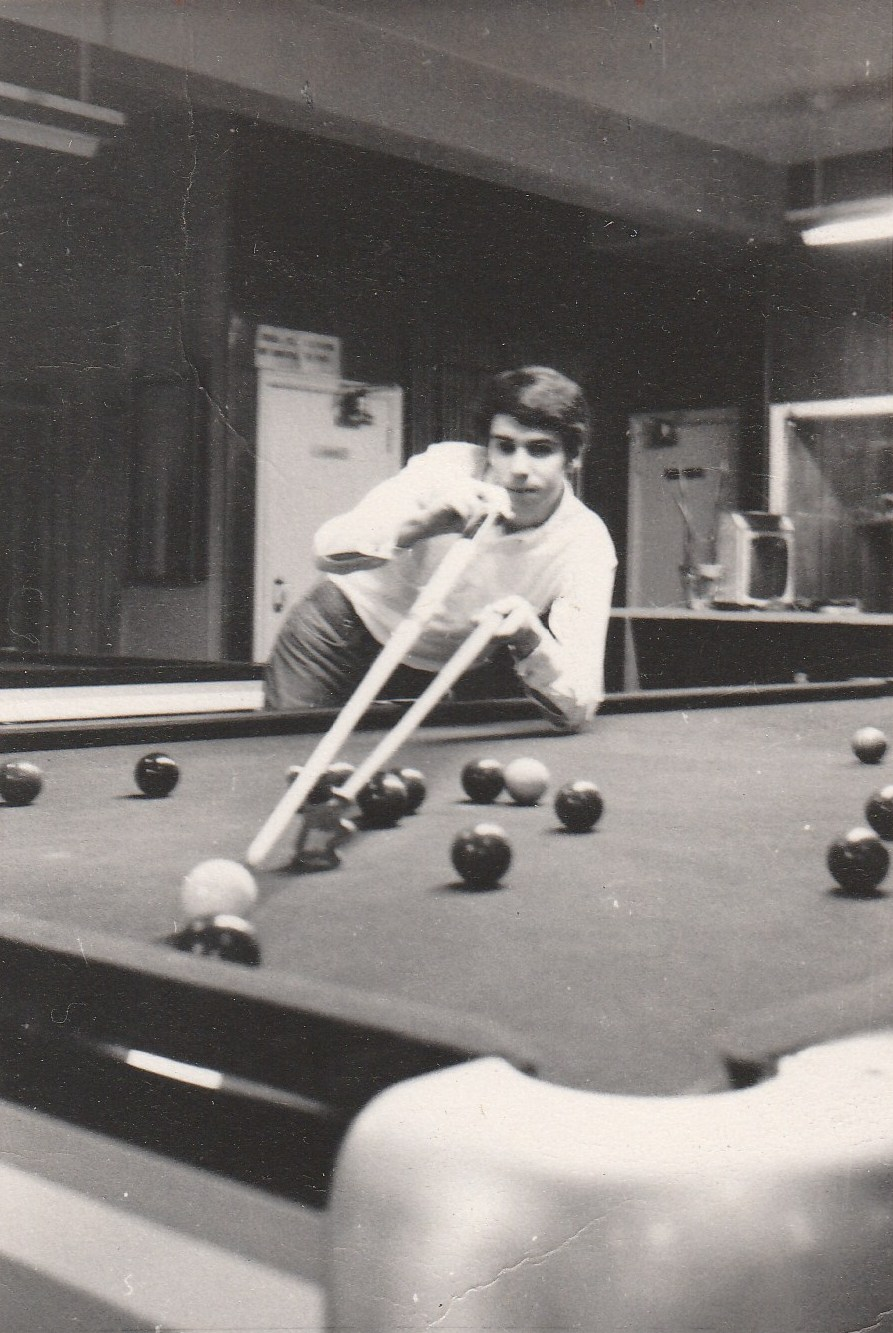
Laucke won against the North American snooker champion

Laucke was born in Montreal, Quebec, on 29 January 1947 to parents of Russian- and Polish-Jewish heritage. After they separated when Laucke was six months old, he lived with his mother, brother, uncle, and grandmother. His grandmother raised and nurtured him; she died at the age of 100.

At the age of seven, Laucke appeared in the Montreal Star newspaper having designed and built a boat from 2,000 toothpicks. A yo-yo expert by age ten, he soon discovered that he loved performing and competing, eventually winning a C$60 bicycle as the champion among 2,000 contestants in a Montreal yo-yo competition. He discovered an interest in playing guitar, but his brother disapproved, so he practiced at friends' homes. He also took up snooker, and became competent enough by the age of thirteen to gain a job as a demonstrator for the Brunswick Corporation, a snooker table manufacturer. Laucke learned billiards from George Chenier, a fellow Montrealer and the North American snooker champion. The two faced each again four years later at the North American snooker championships in Montreal, where Laucke won the championship. Laucke recalls: "Then I decided to leave snooker, I had done what I wanted to do... My love for the guitar was overwhelming. There was a lot more money in snooker, but snooker was just a passion, and music was my love." Laucke's snooker winnings allowed him to finance 110 trips from Montreal to New York City to study the classical guitar with Franco-Spaniard Rolando Valdés-Blain.

== Early career ==
With Frank Angelo as his manager since 1961, Laucke performed his first guitar concert in Montreal in 1965, a program of atonal music with the Société de musique contemporaine du Québec. In 1971, following the first of his many concerts at the National Gallery of Art in Washington, D.C., The Washington Post proclaimed that Laucke had displayed "the highest form of virtuosity". His first concert in New York took place in 1972 at the Greenwich House Music School. Senator Claiborne Pell was in attendance and invited Laucke to perform his first concerts in Washington, DC, thus beginning a 15-year affiliation as Laucke's active supporter in the U.S. Pell's former campaign manager, Raymond Nelson, handled logistics for many of Laucke's U.S. performances. In 1973, Laucke starred in a documentary produced by Radio-Québec called La Guitare, and he performed at Montreal's Summer Olympic Games in 1976.

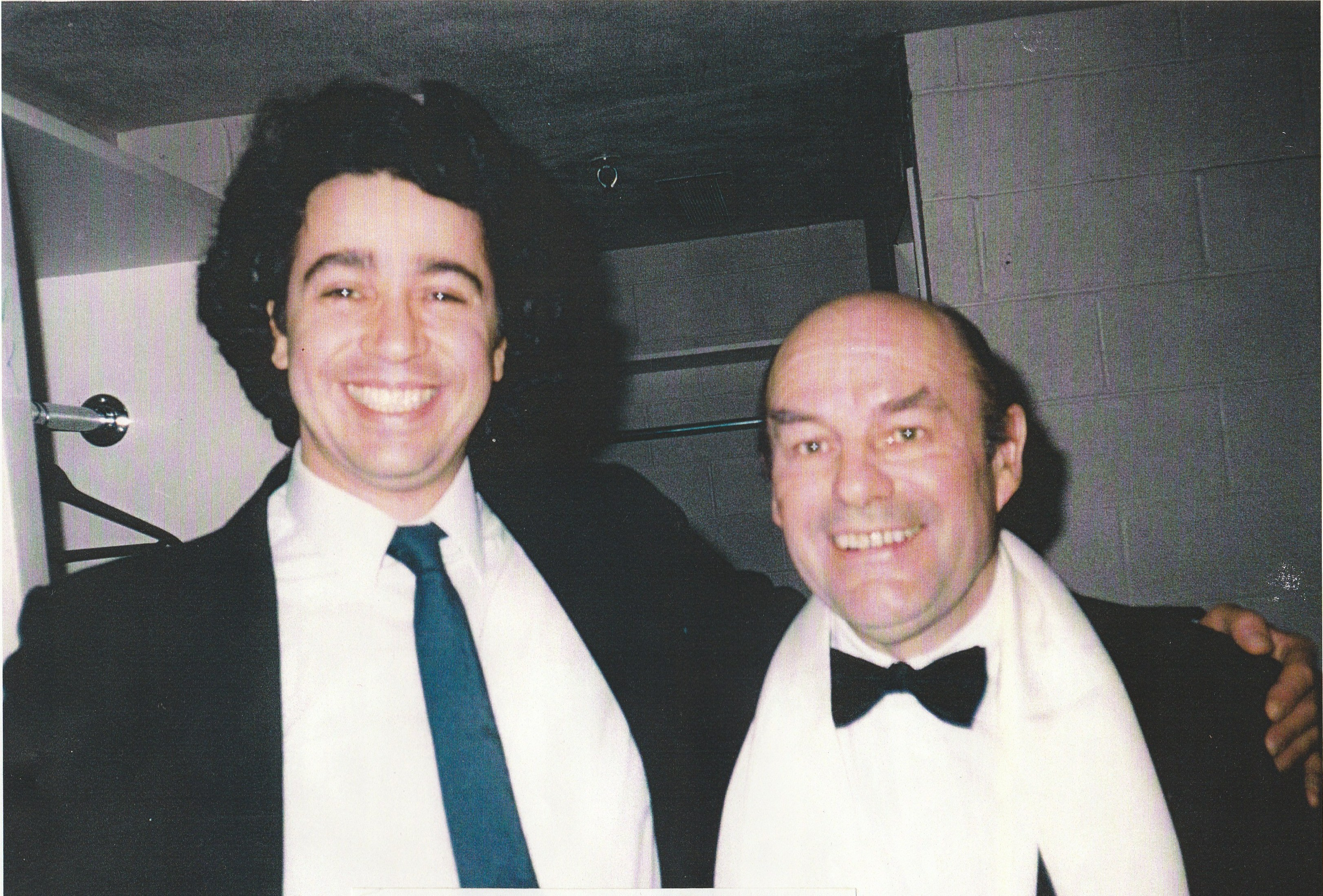
Laucke with his teacher, classical guitarist Julian Bream

Laucke studied with several classical guitar masters: Franco–Spaniard Rolando Valdès-Blain from 1963 to 1977, Julian Bream in 1969 as winner of the Julian Bream Master classes, Alirio Díaz from 1977 to 1979 and Andrés Segovia from 1982 to 1986. Laucke was introduced to complex and advanced flamenco techniques by Spanish guitarist Paco de Lucía when the two shared a loft in New York City in the early 1970s. During this period, de Lucía and Laucke gave a concert in the Spanish Embassy, where Countess Elsa Peretti, jewelry designer at Tiffany's, first heard the two guitarists. She immediately invited them to one of her parties at her New York penthouse, where the two guitarists performed in private for the New York City jet set, including fashion designer Calvin Klein, Andy Warhol, Halston, and Giorgio di Sant'Angelo. The Montreal Gazette noted that these artistic gatherings were: "the closest thing to the 18th century intellectual and artistic salon to be found anywhere these days". Laucke was frequently hired to play at the launches of Giorgio di Sant' Angelo's new fashion lines and later those of Calvin Klein. "I was only 21 at the time, and it all seemed like a dream," Laucke recalled. In 1977, he founded Trio 3 with Sayyd Abdul Al-Khabyyr and Pauline Vaillancourt, and the D'Addario strings-manufacturing company became his sponsor.

His recording of works by William Walton, Richard Rodney Bennett, and François Morel on the Radio Canada International label (RCI 457) won the Canadian Music Council's Grand Prix du Disque-Canada in 1979. The album included Morel's new composition Me duele España, written for and dedicated to Laucke. The world premiere of the 21-minute piece took place at Place des Arts in Montreal, under the auspices of the Société de musique contemporaine du Québec.

Later that year, with an increasing number of concerts and recordings, and a busy travel schedule, Laucke became concerned that he would not have enough hours left for practising. He invented a "practiser": a small, wooden fingerboard with six strings stretched across a bridge. The device measured 8 by 4 inches (20 by 10 centimetres) and allowed him to practice quietly during travel. Laucke found that: "Those extra hours of finger exercises pay off in handsome performance dividends."

Laucke recorded his last classical album in 1981 with singer Riki Turofsky and Guitar and Lute magazine declared it: "One of the best voice and guitar albums you will ever hear." Although Laucke had played both classical and flamenco guitar music from an early age, he performed mainly classical guitar works until 1990. From late 1990 until his last performance in 2015, his concerts consisted exclusively of many flamenco and new flamenco works he learned from de Lucía.

=== Teaching ===
He was a professor of guitar at Concordia University in Montreal in 1976, but left after two years to pursue a performing career. Ten years later, however, he released an eight-tape instructional video series, to pass along the knowledge he had learned from his teachers. This video series was reviewed by Guitar Player magazine: "Laucke's enthusiasm is infectious" and by Frets Magazine: "thoughtful and thorough instruction". Laucke also published articles on classical guitar.

== Style and influences ==
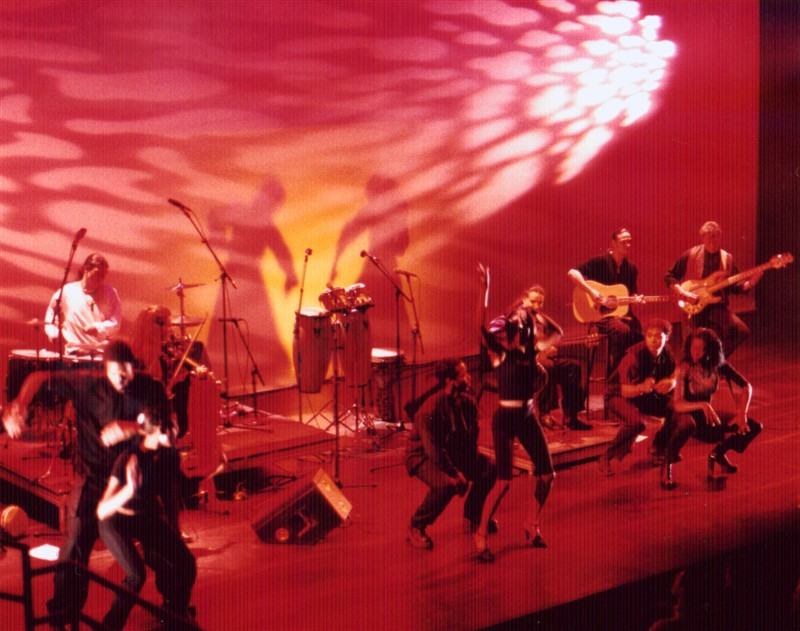
Laucke with his group at Place des Arts – Montreal

Laucke's classical/flamenco musical style is a blend of his classical studies with Bream, Segovia, Valdès-Blain, and his friendship with de Lucía. Although classical and flamenco guitar are two quite different musical styles, Québec's French-language newspaper Le Soleil chronicled Laucke's feelings and reasoning about performing both.

Excerpt from Flamenco Road song by Laucke in 24 track version, a sample of the (new flamenco) style

Since the classical guitar is limited, you eventually look for something else. I was doing flamenco, and I love it. There are more varied techniques in flamenco; just in the right hand alone, we have 20 of them. I would like flamenco to become the new jazz! Flamenco has everything that it takes to follow in the footsteps of jazz and become a language to people of all countries and all cultures. We forget that before being a universal language, jazz was only the mode of expression of blacks in New Orleans! Like jazz, flamenco is based on improvisation and dialogue between instrumentalists. And flamenco is something even more, since players also interact with the dancers.
(English translation)

His blend of the classical and flamenco styles, sometimes referred to as "new flamenco" (nuevo flamenco), led music critic Eric McLean of the Montreal Gazette to proclaim: "It is Laucke's interest in flamenco that makes him special: He might be called the first interpreter of flamenco music, in the sense that he borrows these traditional works by Sabicas, Carlos Montoya and Paco de Lucía, and employs them in his own fashion, a practice to which they agree." Laucke summarized: "The Spanish guitar remains my first love. The flamenco guitar is my passion." According to The Music Scene magazine published by Society of Composers, Authors and Music Publishers of Canada (SOCAN), he is one of "five of Canada's best-known soloists" and the Canadian federal and provincial governments gave him "full recognition as the person who has done more for the guitar in this country than anyone else".

=== Paco de Lucía ===
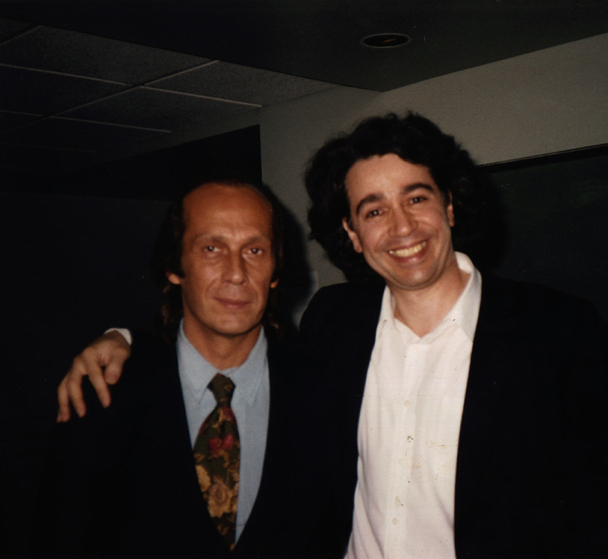
Laucke with his friend and mentor Paco de Lucía

"Between Two Seas" ("Entre dos Aguas") by Paco de Lucía, arranged and played by Laucke

In the 1970s, Laucke moved to New York City to further his career. He was asked by Valdès-Blain if he would mind sharing his one-room apartment with flamenco guitarist Paco de Lucía. Laucke taught de Lucía music by Bach and Villa-Lobos. In return, de Lucía showed Laucke some of the secrets of his art of flamenco, an oral tradition handed down through generations, "their secrets and knowledge jealously guarded". Although Laucke had played flamenco for his own pleasure since he was a child, he had never felt comfortable playing it in public. De Lucía's influence helped change this: "This meeting changed my life," Laucke declared, "he taught me flamenco works which were not written anywhere and to which no other guitarist had access. So for me to be taught all these techniques by a guitarist of Paco's caliber was an incredible stroke of luck". (English translation)

In an interview with the Montreal Gazette, Laucke stated: "[de Lucía] was the greatest natural talent I have ever come across." At the time, Laucke was impressed by a piece called Entre dos aguas (Between Two Seas) that de Lucía was creating, which became arguably his best-known composition. Since de Lucía did not read music, Laucke offered to teach him but he refused. When the question arose as to whether Laucke would ever play de Lucía's compositions in public, he advised Laucke, "you must do it in your own style".

He teamed up again with de Lucía to give a series of concerts combining the two repertoires. Many newspapers talked about this association. The Canadian Spanish magazine El Popular stated: "Laucke is convinced that flamenco possesses enormous seductive powers. 'The harmonies and the rhythm leave no one indifferent', says Laucke."

The meeting with de Lucía led Laucke to perform two incompatible guitar styles. In 1991, he recorded compositions de Lucía taught him on the album Spanish Guitar Stories. De Lucía expressed his approval, saying the album was: "very beautiful, all of it, from a to z, even my pieces!"

=== Flamenco Road album ===
On 12 September 2001, Laucke released a CD called Flamenco Road, consisting mainly of his own compositions in the new flamenco style, which he also arranged. In an interview for Voir magazine, Laucke stated: "It is also very influenced by my classical background. So it's a smoother flamenco." An example of this style from the album can be heard in Laucke's treatment of the well-known classical guitar transcription "Leyenda", which is given a flamenco rendition using several percussion instruments (claves, maracas, special castanets mounted on wood blocks, chimes, and a large gong), bass, and flute.

Ten works were recorded at five different studios in Montreal, each chosen for its unique acoustics. The instrumentation for the recording's title piece, "Flamenco Road", required the use of 24 tracks. It comprises a combination of four types of guitars—flamenco, Spanish, classical, and electric—and all natural acoustic guitars are played the Spanish way, using all the fingers of the right hand without a pick. The rhythm section includes bongos, four congas, and a rock drum set blended with other percussion instruments such as claves, maracas, and castanets. It further incorporates three dancers performing typical "palmas" (hand-clapping) in synchronization, as well as three trumpets, three pianos, and a "country-style" violinist.

The enhanced CD includes two videos: one with interactive live concert footage filmed during Laucke's tenth season at Montreal's Place des Arts, and the other with the video clip of "Flamenco Road". The latter reached number one on video charts across Canada for five consecutive weeks.

== Contributions to the guitar repertoire ==
=== Transcriptions ===
SOCAN lists 112 classical works transcribed for the guitar by Laucke, illustrating the extent to which he broadened the guitar's repertoire in music of the Renaissance, classical, baroque, and romantic eras, as well as in flamenco. Library and Archives Canada and Canadian Libraries list 43 music recordings, music scores of transcriptions for guitar and Canadian guitar articles written by Laucke. Waterloo Music Company published and distributed 24 of Laucke's guitar transcriptions of works by J. S. Bach, Luis de Narváez, Eric Satie, Heitor Villa-Lobos and others.

==== Trois Gymnopédies by Eric Satie ====
Trois Gymnopedies by Eric Satie, transcribed and performed on guitar by Laucke
"Gymnopédie No. 1"

"Gymnopédie No. 2"

"Gymnopédie No. 3"

While living in Greenwich Village, New York, in the early 1970s, Laucke became interested in the French music of Eric Satie, "the world's first hippie". At that time, only simplified arrangements of Trois Gymnopédies (Three Gymnopédies) existed for the guitar, so Laucke set out to transcribe Satie's three works from the piano score. Determined to fit all of the notes from the original piano version using the guitar's six strings, over the course of three weeks he calculated the number of times open strings would occur per note.

In 1979, Laucke signed with the Waterloo Music Publishing Company, which that year published the sheet music of his transcription of Trois Gymnopédies, the first of many of his transcriptions to be published by Waterloo and arguably the only version for guitar to include all of the notes of the original piano composition. In 1985, the company created The Michael Laucke Series of guitar arrangements and transcriptions.

In the introductory notes to his sheet music for Trois Gymnopédies, Laucke comments: "The characteristic harmonies of much of the music of Erik Satie belong to the impressionist period and, though originally written for the piano, are extremely well-suited to the natural idiomatic expression of the guitar. This has led me to make these transcriptions which will enrich the repertoire of the guitar while remaining faithful to Satie's intentions."

After giving many concert performances of these works, Laucke recorded them on his CD entitled Flamenco Road which held the number one position on video charts across Canada for six weeks. The liner notes read: "My arrangements of 'The [sic] Three Gymnopédies' comprise ALL the notes of the original piano versions: a most complex process since all the piano sounds must fit comfortably, or uncomfortably, onto the six strings of the guitar." He continues to say: "The present recording is done as it is in concert, on one classical guitar, without overdubbing. My tempo is a little quicker than when the pieces are played on the piano, due to the shorter resonance time of notes played on the Spanish guitar. Now and then, I use a 'vibrato' and slides, which, of course, can't be done on the piano but which add warmth of expression to this undeniably charming, exotic and mystic music."

=== Original works ===
Laucke had at least 25 original, Canadian atonal works written for him, among them the Flamenco Concierto for guitar and full symphonic orchestra by Michel-Georges Brégent, Me duele España by François Morel, Exploration by Jean Papineau-Couture and Pour guitare, Claude Vivier's only work for the guitar. Laucke performed all 25 works in major halls, on CBC radio and on his record albums; all of them were commissioned by, and dedicated to, Laucke.

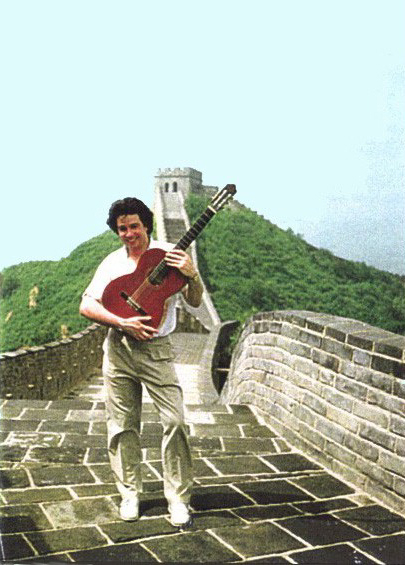
During the CBC documentary on the Great Wall of China

In 1984, critics began to take note of the growth of new Canadian guitar works energized by Laucke. In La Presse, a Canadian newspaper, music critic Claude Gingras found in Laucke "an interpreter who could not be more convincing". Canadian composer Claude Vivier expressed his appreciation to Laucke. In his letters, Vivier states that he had: "hardly ever met a musician as committed and dedicated, of such great quality and, above all, of such great completeness and intense capacity for work".

== World tours ==
Laucke's career spans over 50 years, with concert and television appearances in 25 countries, including England (Wigmore Hall), the United States (Carnegie Hall, and the White House), as well as China, on the Great Wall of China. Other countries where Laucke performed include Bulgaria, Hungary, Hong Kong, Spain, Israel, India, Japan, Morocco, Pakistan, and Russia. In Canada, he gave annual concerts at Montreal's Place des Arts from 1986. Following a concert in 1990 in Quebec City's Grand Théâtre de Québec, the French-language newspaper Le Soleil wrote a review entitled "Michael Laucke makes one fall in love with the guitar", stating: "More than a virtuoso, charismatic Michael Laucke is pure talent! For him playing is instinctive, just like breathing ...irresistible Michael Laucke." Critics have often written about Laucke's stage presence. A Chicago music critic described how: "His relaxed manner, beaming smile and gracious speaking voice won the hearts of the audience before he even played a note."

He performed many concerts in Washington, DC, under the auspices of U.S. Senator Claiborne Pell, including several at the National Gallery of Art. The Washington Post proclaimed that Laucke is: "one of the finest guitarists to have played in Washington in a long time." On another occasion, Laucke gave the premiere of Bregent's "Version of Sapho," written for him, an atonal work which received a less favorable critique. The Washington Post stated: "Since the mind can only respond to some sort of form, its essential formlessness precludes discussion. A triad out of the blue signaled the end, which the large audience recognized and applauded."

== Personal life and death ==
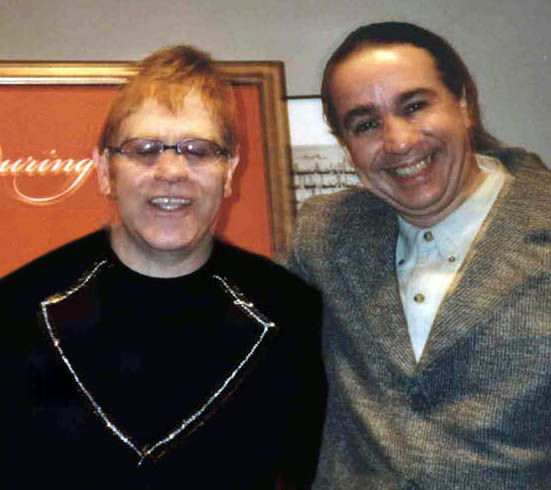
Laucke with Elton John, working on the fight against HIV/AIDS

In 1994, Laucke became a director of the Mac AIDS Fund (M·A·F) established by his friend Frank Angelo, the co-founder of MAC Cosmetics. After a fourteen-year tenure, he became honorary charter member of the board of directors and no longer participated in its activities. According to Laucke, MAF's directors helped coordinate the film Pandemic: Facing AIDS by Rory Kennedy, and MAF became a secondary sponsor while the Bill and Melinda Gates Foundation became title sponsor.

In 2012, Laucke was nominated for the Order of Canada Lifetime Achievement Award. In 2015, he was again nominated for the same award.

Laucke died on 2 December 2021 in Montreal, aged 74. No cause of death was given.

== Media ==
=== Audio ===
"Asturias" (Leyenda), arranged, transcribed and performed on guitar by Laucke
"Asturias" (Leyenda)
This flamenco rendition uses bass, flute, and several percussion instruments (claves, maracas, special castanets mounted on wood blocks, chimes and a large gong).

=== Video ===
J. S. Bach ~ bourree and double, performed by Laucke
This is a transcription from the original work, "Violin Partita No. 1 in B minor BWV 1002."

Satie's "Gymnopédie No. 1", performed by Laucke
This transcription necessitates intricate fingering to render all the notes of the piano version onto the guitar.

FLAMENCO ROAD Video Clip with Laucke
An example of a new flamenco composition using 24 tracks.

== Selected works ==
=== CD ===
- Flamenco Road (2001)
- Michael Laucke & Fiesta Flamenco: Live (1996)
- Spanish Guitar (1993)
- Momentum – IMAX Film (the music) (1992)
- Spanish Guitar Stories (1991)
- Light Classics (1990)

=== LP ===
- Take A Short Cut (1989)
- Canadian Guitar Music (1987)
- Music For Jacques Cartier (1986)
- Canadian Guitar Quartet: Live From (1985)
- Com-Possession (1985)
- Divergences (1984)
- Jade Eyes (1980)
- Michael Laucke, Guitarist: Grand Prix du Disque-Canada, (1979)
- Trio 3 (1979)
- Transcription (1969)

=== Filmography ===
- Momentum (IMAX film) (1992)
- I Won't Dance (1991)
- How to Play Solo Classical Guitar (1985)
- Michael Laucke: Guitar recital, CBC (1983)
- Segovia: Metropolitan museum: a master class, PBS (1982)
- Form & Fire: Michael Laucke (1981)
- Musique instrumentale: La guitare (1973)

=== Atonal works written for Laucke ===
The following works have been performed by Laucke in Carnegie Hall (performing Jean Papineau-Couture), Wigmore Hall (Michel-Georges Brégent), and National Gallery of Art (Michel Gonneville). In Canada, the SMCQ honoured Laucke's contribution by featuring him in a two-hour-long concert.

- Départ by François Morel (1970)
- Iikkii by François Morel (1970)
- Pour Guitare by Claude Vivier (1976)
- Le Cercle gnostique by Walter Boudreau (1976)
- Me duele españa by François Morel (1979)
- Contrastare no 1 by David Eagle (1980)
- La Fille du Pecheur by Alan Crossman (1981)
- Calme en soi by Bruno Deschênes (1981)
- Quatre études, Anachorétisme, Quatre mouvements by Claude Lassonde (1982)
- Image et Sonoritéé, Silène pur Satyre, La Règne by Claude Lassonde (1982)
- Com-possession by John Rea (1983)
- ...ascends at full moon by John Burke
- Exploration by Jean Papineau-Couture (1983)
- Le Sommeil, le Regard, le Choix by Michel Gonneville (1983)
- Three Amerindian Songs, Prelude by Wolfgang Bottenberg (1983)
- Sapho by Michel-Georges Brégent (1983)
- Divergence by François Morel (1983)
- Pas de deux by Denis Dion (1983)
- Cobwebs in my Spanish castle by Leon Zukert (1983)
- Chamber Concierto for guitar by Donald Steven (1986)
- Concierto Flamenco by Michel-Georges Brégent (1991)

== Articles ==
Laucke has published articles in music journals about the growth in popularity of the guitar in Canada including:

- "The Guitar in Canada" (five pages)‍—‌Soundboard Magazine, California
- "Growth of the Guitar in Canada", by Michael Laucke (six pages)‍—‌Guitar and Lute magazine, Hawaii
- "Michael Laucke Writes About the Canadian Guitar"‍—‌Waterloo Music Journal, Canada

== Timeline ==
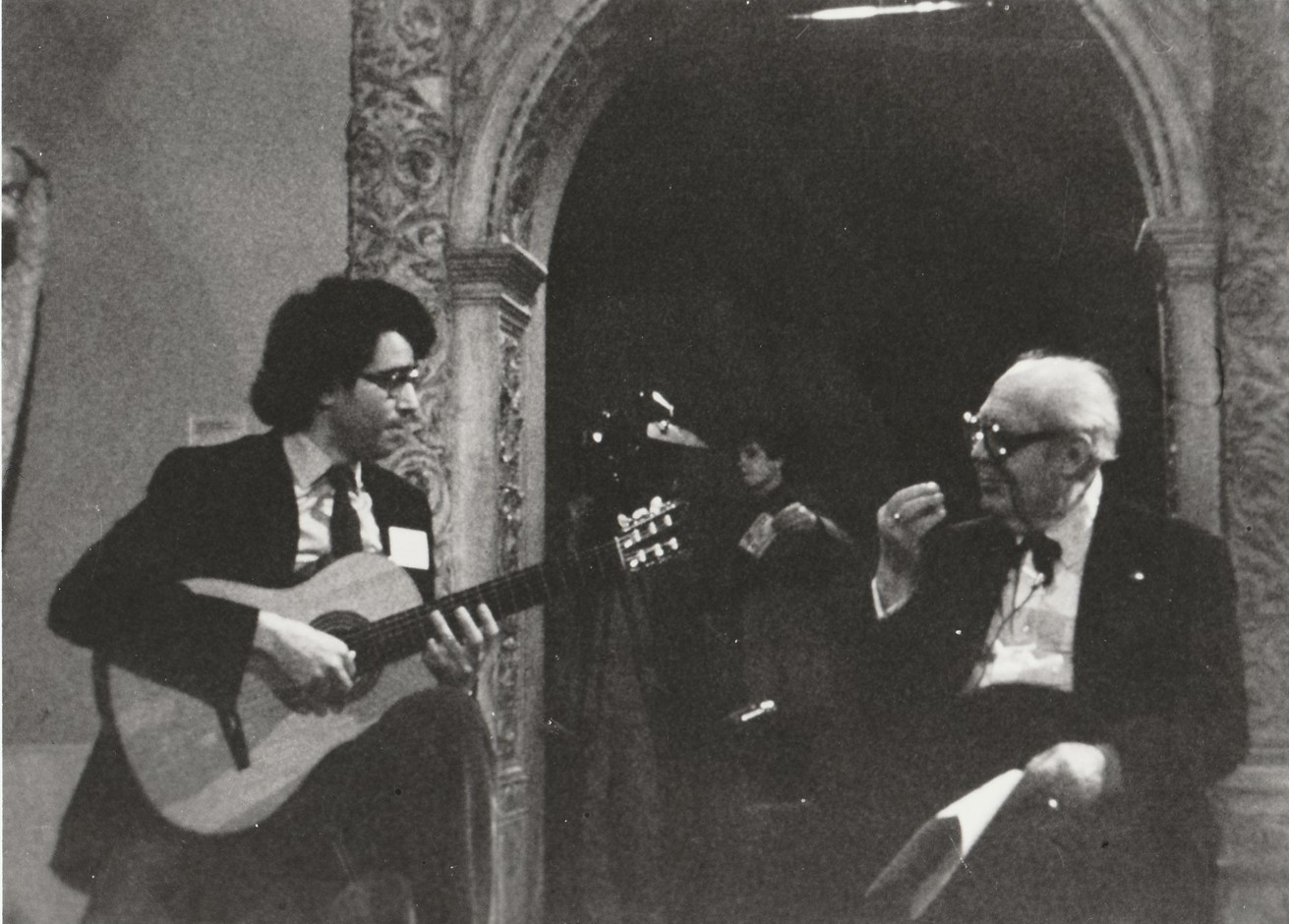
With Andrés Segovia‍—‌PBS TV at Metropolitan Museum of Art NYC

- 1976, he performed at Montreal's Olympic Games
- 1979, Laucke won the Grand Prix du Disque-Canada for Best Canadian Recording
- 1981, Laucke was invited to perform a Command performance for His Excellency the Right Honourable Edward Schreyer the Governor General of Canada and his wife, as winner of the Jules Léger Prize for New Chamber Music
- March 1982, Laucke's album Jade Eyes, for CBS records, was reviewed by Guitar and Lute magazine (Hawaii) as the best international classical guitar album of the year
- 1982, he was selected by Segovia to perform a 25-minute work by Manuel Ponce which was filmed by the PBS network at the Metropolitan Museum of Art in New York, after which he became Segovia's pupil.
- 1985, 8 to 12 February‍—‌five days of interviews and career profile, two hours each day, on CBC Radio's Morningside with Peter Gzowski
- 1986, on the 450th anniversary of Jacques Cartier's first voyage of discovery to Canada, Canadian Heritage requested that Laucke record a commemorative album. Laucke recorded music that Cartier would have heard on his voyage to the new world
- 1986, several musical publications mention Laucke's contribution to the guitar and its new repertoire. SOCAN, the Canadian copyright organization, stated in The Music Scene magazine, that they considered Laucke to be one of "five of Canada's best-known soloists"
- 1986, he created an instructional video series which was critically reviewed by Guitar Player magazine and Frets Magazine.
- May 1988, two years later, Canada's music Critic Emeritus Eric McLean wrote in the Montreal Gazette that Laucke was then recognized as: "the person who has done more for the guitar in this country than anyone else"
- 1991, Laucke performed the world premiere of the Flamenco Concierto with the Montreal Symphony Orchestra. Written for him by Michel-Georges Brégent, reviewers called it "Brilliant".
- 1992, Laucke performed in a Super IMAX film called Momentum, for the National Film Board of Canada; it was shown in the Canadian pavilion during the Universal Exposition of Seville (Expo '92)‍—‌a world's fair. The most popular pavilions for the visitors were those of Spain and Canada. Co-directed by Colin Low, it is the first film in 48 frames per second IMAX HD.
- 12 September 2001, Laucke's CD Flamenco Road reached number one on video charts across Canada for five consecutive weeks

== See also ==
- Baron Byng High School Notable Alumni
- List of classical guitarists
- List of Concordia University Notable faculty
- List of flamenco guitarists
- Sam Tata (Canadian Photographer)
