= Frans Ben Callado =

Canadian composer

- Born: 1978 (age 47–48); Montreal, Quebec, Canada
- Occupations: composer, writer, visual artist

Frans Ben Callado (Spanish: [kaˈʎaðo]; born 1978) is a Colombian-Canadian composer, writer and visual artist of Spanish heritage.

== Biography ==
Born in Montreal in 1978, he grew up in Madrid and near London. He studied composition with John Woolrich, Michel Gonneville and Michel Longtin. A pianist and improviser, he is the author of numerous compositions, written for different soloists and ensembles, such as Ensemble Allogène, Ensemble Chorum and Toronto's New Music Concerts. A founding member of the experimental rock collective, Concorde Crash (2001–06), he has organised many multidisciplinary cabarets and events in Montreal. Also a translator and blogger, his literary output is written in three languages: Spanish, French and English. In 2010, he participated in the International Poetry Festival at Colima, Mexico, translating his own poems. He took part in the 40th anniversary of the Nuit de la Poésie.

== Publications ==
- Visages après l'averse, Poètes de brousse, 2007
- Faire Confiance à un animal, Poètes de brousse, 2010
- McKinley, Maxime; Bhagwati, Sandeep; Callado, Frans Ben; Derome, Julie-Anne; Edwards, Wolf; Hamel, André; Marcotte, Nicolas-Alexandre; Sharman, Rodney (March 11, 2011). "Musique de création et spiritualité : forum à sept voix". Circuit. 21 (1): 61–74. doi:10.7202/1001163ar. S2CID 171032557.

== Compositions (selective list) ==
- L'Ange Gauche (1997–99)
- Neuf Orbites autour de la lune (2000)
- Symphony no.1 « Résistance » (2001–2002)
- Échantillons d'un Bestiaire (lieder) (2002–2003)
- Cantiques d'Hypnos (lieder) (2003)
- Les Américains Brefs (opera) (2003)
- Ungesetzliche-lieder (2004)
- Musique pour une grève étudiante (2005)
- Le Parcours de Naunet (2005)
- Circulation des noms, des âmes, des dons et des esprits (2005)
- Naos (2006)
- Le Livre Caché (2006)
- Sanatorium (2007)
- Black Boxes (2008)
- Tientos del Guadarrama (2008–09)
- Symphony no.2 « De Profundis » (2008–09)
- Concertino for bassoon and strings (2009)
- Officium pro Defunctis (2010)
- Punctum Remotum (2010)
