= Clayton Lewis =

American painter (1915–1995)

Clayton Scott Lewis
- Born: March 15, 1915; Snoqualmie, Washington, U.S.
- Died: September 15, 1995 (aged 80); Point Reyes National Seashore, California, U.S.
- Education: Cornish School for the Arts, California School of Fine Arts
- Known for: Envelope art, Jewelry design, Sculpture, Painting, Watercolor

Clayton Scott Lewis (March 15, 1915 – September 15, 1995) was an American artist, known primarily for his work as an envelope artist and jewelry designer.

== Life and career ==
Clayton Lewis began his professional life as a furniture designer in the late 1940s with his firm, Claywood Designs, which led to coverage in magazines such as Progressive Architecture and Interiors. After a rare bone disease put him in the hospital, and with a young family to support, in 1950, he was hired as general manager of the Herman Miller Furniture Company’s Venice, California office. There he helped implement designs by Charles Eames, Ray Eames, Isamu Noguchi, and George Nelson.

After a tenure at Herman Miller, he left his position and moved his family to Northern California, in 1953, to open up his own art studio. Following various shows and the subsequent breakup of his marriage in 1962, he moved first to Nevada City in 1963, and then to the Point Reyes Peninsula in 1964, where he designed a large collection of sculpture jewelry while working with Judy Perlman. After they disbanded their partnership of Perlman-Lewis in 1973, he continued working on his own as a sculptor, painter, and water colorist.

Between 1980 and 1985, he produced over 1000 pieces of mail art, mostly sent to his mother in the final years of her life. The envelopes have been shown in one-man and group shows in San Francisco, Pasadena, and Paris, among other locations.

His work can be found in the permanent collections of the San Francisco Museum of Modern Art; Metropolitan Museum, New York; Los Angeles County Museum of Art; California Historical Society, San Francisco; Musée de La Poste, Paris, France; among others.

For the last 31 years of his life he lived in a group of Coast Miwok Indian cottages at Lairds Landing, on Tomales Bay, fifty miles north of San Francisco. There he built a spacious sculpting and painting studio with a substantial foundry to work in. In order to help sustain himself, he worked as a carpenter, fisherman, and boat builder, as well as an artist.

Clayton Lewis was born in Snoqualmie, Washington and died at his home at Laird’s Landing, Point Reyes National Seashore, California. He was raised in Snoqualmie before moving to Seattle in 1936 to study at the Cornish School for the Arts (later Cornish College of the Arts). Between 1937 and 1940 he lived in San Francisco, where he studied at the California School of Fine Arts (later the San Francisco Art Institute).

Clayton Lewis was married to Virginia Harding Lewis from 1942–1962. They had four children, including the composer, Peter Scott Lewis.
