= Rémi Bolduc =

Canadian musician

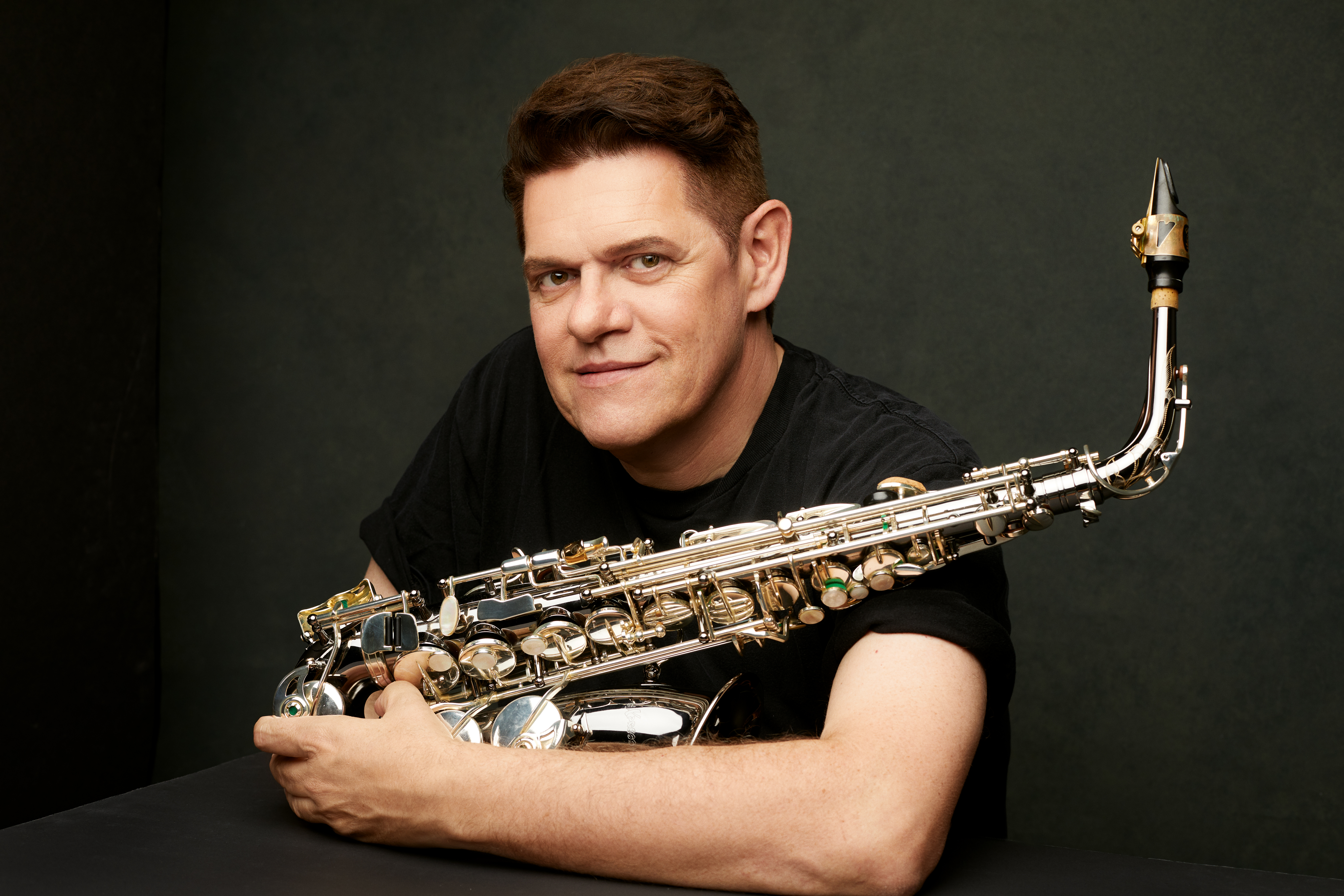
- Saxophonist Rémi Bolduc in 2019

Background information
- Born: June 17, 1962 (age 64); Quebec City, Quebec, Canada
- Genres: Jazz
- Occupations: Musician, composer, educator, professor
- Instruments: alto saxophone
- Website: remibolduc.com

Rémi Bolduc (born June 17, 1962) is a Canadian jazz saxophonist, bandleader and composer. He teaches jazz at the Schulich School of Music, McGill University in Montreal, Canada.

== Career ==
Originally from St-Hyacinthe, Quebec, Bolduc had an early start to his career, playing the saxophone professionally at 15 years of age. In 1982, he moved to Montreal, Quebec where he would work with established saxophonists Sayyd Abdul Al-Khabyyr, Simon Stone and Bob Mover. In the 1980s, Bolduc joined the hard-bop Bernard Primeau Jazz Ensemble and the Vic Vogel Big Band. He studied with New York-based alto saxophonist Steve Coleman and composer Vince Mendoza.

His projects include A Tribute to Charlie Parker, The Random Masters, A Tribute to Dave Brubeck and Sax Zenith with P.J. Perry, Phil Dwyer, Kirk MacDonald and Kelly Jefferson. He has recorded many albums as a leader, including several with international artists such as bassist Marc Johnson, pianist Kenny Werner and tenor saxophonist Jerry Bergonzi. Several of his albums have received an enthusiastic response on both sides of the Atlantic. One of his most accomplished projects, the CD "Tribute to Charlie Parker", won the FÉLIX Award for Best Jazz Album at the 2011 ADISQ.

Bolduc is an associate professor at the Schulich School of Music, McGill University in Montreal, Canada.

He is a Twigg Musique a Yamaha Artist and a D'Addario Canada Artist

Remi Bolduc helped in the creation of a saxophone series that bears his name for Expression Saxophones. He contributed to three models.

== Discography ==
=== As leader ===
- 2026 The Bolduc Groove Quintet - with Rémi Bolduc – Alto sax, compositions, Chantel DeVilliers – Tenor Sax, Vocal, Nick Semenykhin – guitar, Ira Coleman – bass, Rich Irwin – drums
- 2023 Rémi Bolduc invite Jerry Bergonzi – Les Esprits Oubliés - with Rémi Bolduc – alto saxophone, Jerry Bergonzi – tenor saxophone, Marie-Fatima Rudolf – piano, Ira Coleman – bass, Jim Doxas – drums
- 2018 Sax Zenith (Live), with guests: Phil Dwyer, P.J. Perry, Kirk MacDonald and Kelly Jefferson, Fraser Hollins on bass and Dave Laing on drums. Label: Art and Soul Productions.
- 2017 Swingin' with Oscar, The Music of Oscar Peterson with pianist Taurey Butler. Label: Art and Soul Productions.
- 2015 Hommage À / Tribute To Dave Brubeck, The music of Dave Brubeck with pianist François Bourassa. Label: Effendi Records
- 2013 Random Masters, Label: Effendi Records
- 2011 Hommage à Charlie Parker, Rémi Bolduc Jazz Ensemble : Three alto saxophones and rhythm section (winner of the Félix Award for Jazz Album of the Year). Label: Effendi Records
- 2007 4 + 1, Rémi Bolduc Jazz Ensemble and Jerry Bergonzi Label: Effendi Records
- 2005 Côte d'écoute, Rémi Bolduc Trio, saxophone, piano and cello. Label: Effendi Records
- 2003 TCHAT, Rémi Bolduc and Kenny Werner. Label: Justin Time Records
- 2001 Renaissance, Rémi Bolduc Jazz Ensemble. Label: Effendi Records
- 1996 Fable, Rémi Bolduc Quartet with Marc Johnson and Ben Monder. Label: Les disques du Silence

=== As sideman ===
- 2015 Funky Princess, Chantal De Villiers, CDV Records. co-producer
- 2014 Effendi Mood 2005, Compilation Effendi Records
- 2013 Terre Mère, Jocelyn Ménard Caribbean Jazz Group (Guadeloupe)
- 2011 Code White, André White, Chance Records
- 2011 In Other Words, Thom Gossage, Songlines Records
- 2011 1+4, Karl Schwonick Jazz Ensemble
- 2010 Northern Ontario Suite, Joe Sullivan Big Band, Perry Lake Records
- 2010 Octo Portraits, Jazz Lab Orchestra, Les disques Effendi
- 2009 Blackboard Tune, Pierre Francois Quartet, Rare Bird Records
- 2008 Impulsi, Thom Gossage
- 2007 Stop and Listen, Joe Sullivan Big Band, Les disques Effendi
- 2006 Joe Sullivan Big Band, Joe Sullivan Big Band, Les disques Effendi
- 2006 Other Voices 5, Thom Gossage, Les disques Effendi
- 2006 DÉSIR / BALLADES, Jazz Lab Orchestra, Les disques Effendi
- 2006 Chance Meetin,' Jazz Lab, Les disques Effendi
- 2006 Another Step, Sylvain Cossette, Les disques Jodo
- 2004 Réunion, Jazz Lab Orchestra, Les disques Effendi
- 2003 The Now Beyond, Thom Gossage, Les disques Effendi
- 2001 Other Voices, Thom Gossage, Les disques Effendi
- 1994 Le Corps de l’ouvrage, René Lussier, Ambiances Magnétiques
- 1990 Le Big Band, Vic Vogel. Avec Zoot Sims et Phil Woods, Grudge Records
- 1989 Propulsion, Bernard Primeau Sextet, CBC Records
- 1987 Perspective, Bernard Primeau, Disques Contact

== Awards and nominations ==
- 2022 Opus Awards Mention of Excellence for Concerts and Web Creations Broadcast, Jazz (Rémi Bolduc and Jean-Michel Pilc)
- 2021 Opus Prize Winner: Jazz Concert of the Year, (Rémi Bolduc invites Funky Princess)
- 2018 Opus Prize Nominee: : Jazz Concert of the Year, Concert at Salle Bourgie. Le Génie de Coltrane 2017 Opus Prize Nomination: : Jazz Concert of the Year with Jerry Bergonzi (tenor sax)
- 2016 Opus Prize Winner: Jazz Concert of the Year, (Tribute to Dave Brubeck)
- 2016 Opus Award Nomination: Jazz Album of the Year, (Tribute to Dave Brubeck) 2015 ADISQ Nomination: Tribute to Dave Brubeck, Jazz Album of the Year
- 2014 Opus Award Nomination: Jazz Concert of the Year, Sax Zenith
- 2013 ADISQ Nomination, Random Masters, Jazz Album of the Year
- 2013 Opus Award Winner: Jazz Concert of the Year, (with Jerry Bergonzi and Phil Dwyer)
- 2011 Felix Award Winner: Jazz Album of the Year (Tribute to Charlie Parker)
