= Mark Delpriora =

American classical composer

Mark Delpriora (born 1959) is an American classical guitarist and composer.

Delpriora is currently Chair of the Guitar Department at the Manhattan School of Music, where he has been on the faculty since 1989. Mark is also on the faculty of The Juilliard School, where he teaches guitar studies. He studied guitar with Rolando Valdés-Blain and later with Manuel Barrueco. He studied theory/composition in his early teens with Roland Trogan and later with Giampaolo Bracali. Mr. Delpriora has recorded for Koch International Classics, Soundspells, Philips, Tzadik, and CRI. In addition, he has recorded 6 CDs with flutist Laurel Zucker on Cantilena Records.

As a performer, the New York Times wrote after his debut: "The first notes of Mark Delpriora's guitar recital established him as a musician of authority. In a little Mozart transcription by Julian Bream he showed a rare feeling for the specific gravity of a Mozartean phrase, for the inevitability of its rise and fall. Delpriora is a guitarist to be reckoned with"

One of the few students chosen to participate in masterclasses by Andrés Segovia, Delpriora has performed and championed music written for, but rarely played by, Segovia, known as The Segovia Archives. The collection is published by Berben Edizioni Musicali and edited by Angelo Gilardino. Angelo Gilardino wrote after hearing Delpriora play this music: “His playing is very fluent, effortless, elegant and extremely refined, and his view of the music he performs is sophisticated, still direct and transparent".

He has performed and taught master classes in Brazil, Canada, Mexico, Uruguay, Italy and the United States and has been recognized with many awards, including the inaugural Andrés Segovia Award for Outstanding Performance given by the Manhattan School of Music with Segovia in attendance, the Beard’s Fund Award, and the Artists International Distinguished Artist Award, and by grants, including a United Nations Travel Grant and grants from Meet the Composers and the Cooper Institute for the Arts and Humanities. In addition, he has performed at the Lake Placid Chamber Music Festival, Piccolo Spoleto, Stetson University Guitar Festival, Rutgers University Summerfest, Eastman Guitarfest and the Summit Music Festival; and with the New York Contemporary Music Band, New Music Consort, Joffrey Ballet Orchestra, and the Washington Bach Consort. More recently Mark Delpriora has been performing on the baroque guitar, giving his first all-baroque guitar recital at William Paterson University's 2007 Guitar Fest.

His compositions have been published by Bèrben Edizioni Musicali (the 50-minute Sonata No.3, Sonata No.2, Elegia per Basil Keiser), Editions Orphée (Tango Caffè Carciofo, 10 Short Studies in Kaleidoscope,Creation Fugue, Variations on a Theme of Sor), and Guitar Arts Publishing (Four Images after a poem by e.e. cummings), MelBay (Tambu Fantasy). All of the above works, particularly the Sonatas, are contrapuntally complex, dramatically shaped and technically challenging. Sonata no.3 has become particularly renowned and is the subject of a chapter in Manuale di storia della chitarra. 2: La chitarra nel ventesimo secolo by Gianni Nuti.

Delpriora's most recent composition is the 35 minute set of variations on Fernando Sor's Opus 24, #1. The scope of this work is unprecedented in the guitar repertoire, at twice the length of Britten's Nocturnal the closest equivalent must be found in the piano repertoire e.g. Rzewski's variations The People United Will never be Defeated. Delpriora writes: "In the tradition of Mario Castelnuovo-Tedesco’s 'Variations à travers les siècles', Astor Piazzola’s 'Histoire du Tango' and Argento’s song cycle 'Letters from Composers', I have taken an historical view of composition for my 'Variations on a Theme by Sor'. This new set of variations follows Sor’s little Menuet in c minor op. 24 N° 1 as it makes its epic journey across time and space through the nineteenth century and into the early years of the twentieth century. During its travels, the theme meets and pays its respects to the godfathers of nineteenth century music and as a result is irrevocably transformed". In a sense, this work can be said to be a musical example of Metahistorical romance. The last page of the published work contains an imaginary interview between Delpriora and the nineteenth century musicologist François-Joseph Fétis.

Two of the variations (12 and 14) served as the set piece for the 2011 GFA competition.

His Elegia and several of his 10 Short Studies, the seventh of which is 9 seconds in duration, demonstrate a particular interest in very short forms with an accompanying intimate emotional sensitivity.

Mark and his family live in Brooklyn, New York.
