= Peter Scott Lewis =

American composer

Peter Scott Lewis (born August 31, 1953 in San Rafael, California) is an American composer of contemporary classical music.

== Career ==
Lewis's works have been commissioned and/or performed by the Rotterdam Philharmonic; Princeton Symphony Orchestra; Berkeley Symphony Orchestra; Chamber Music Society of Lincoln Center; Alexander String Quartet, Orion String Quartet, Ciompi Quartet; Dorian Wind Quintet; Conspirare, Intiman Theater; and various conductors and soloists including Kent Nagano, Alan Gilbert, Craig Hella Johnson, David Tanenbaum (guitarist), William Winant, Susan Narucki, Sasha Cooke, Jason Vieaux, and Kees Hülsmann.

His major compositions include two violin concertos, two cello concertos, guitar concerto, Where the Heart Is Pure (mezzo-soprano and chamber orchestra or piano), Pacific Triptych (orchestra or piano solo); An Urban Landscape (orchestra); River Shining Through (string quartet); Night Lights (string quartet); Rhapsodic Images (piano trio); Second Piano Trio, Beaming Contrasts (guitar and string quartet), Through The Mountain (cello and piano); A Whistler's Dream (flute and piano); 6 suites and Sun Music, for piano; 3 suites and a partita for guitar, among others.

Sono Luminus, Naxos - American Classics, New Albion, and Lapis Island Records have produced numerous albums devoted to his music. They are Beaming Contrasts (1993), Where The Heart Is Pure (1996), Peter Lewis: Three Suites For Guitar (2003), Atlantic Crossing/Rhapsodic Images (2004), River Shining Through (2007), The Four Cycles (2016), Home Stretch (2019), and Pacific Triptych (2025). Publishers: Theodore Presser Company and Lapis Island Press (Subito Music Distribution).

Lewis graduated from the Yale School of Music and San Francisco Conservatory of Music. He studied composition with Andrew Imbrie, Jacob Druckman, Nicholas Maw, and Morton Subotnick; studied guitar with Alirio Diaz and Carlos Barbosa-Lima; and conducting with Arthur Weisberg.

== Personal life ==
Peter Scott Lewis is the son of artist, Clayton Lewis. He attended Garfield High School in Seattle, Washington.
