= Rolando Valdés-Blain =

Cuban-American classical guitarist

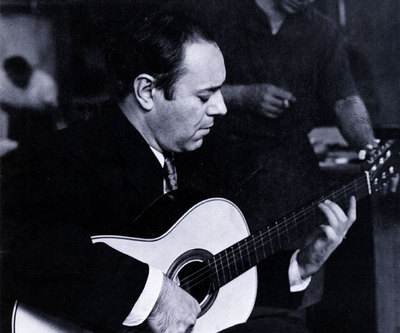
- Valdés-Blain

Background information
- Born: 8 March 1922; Havana, Cuba
- Died: 2 April 2011 (aged 89) New York City
- Genres: Classical
- Occupation: Instrumentalist
- Instrument: Classical guitar
- Labels: Decca; Roulette; SMC

Rolando Valdés-Blain (8 March 1922 – 2 April 2011) was a Cuban classical guitarist, born in Havana, and immigrated to New York as a child. In the 1930s he and his brother Alberto had a weekly music show on WNYC radio. He served in Burma from 1942 to 1946 during World War II and afterwards studied at the Madrid Royal Conservatory, where he was awarded the Grand Prize for concert guitar playing by Joaquín Rodrigo. He toured worldwide under the management of impresario Sol Hurok and his United States tours as guitar soloist included Yale University, Carnegie Recital Hall, and the Spanish Ballet. He was one of the pioneering classical guitarists to perform as soloist together with a symphony orchestra, in 1955 with the Radio City Music Hall Symphony Orchestra and the Joffrey Ballet at the New York City Center. He appeared in Tennessee Williams's Broadway play Camino Real and he also composed the music for the play Bullfight. He was vice-president and adviser of Manuel Velazquez guitars and founder of the Guitar Department at the Manhattan School of Music. In 1968 he was invited to give a command performance at the White House. The New York Times called his performance "a musical gem…reflecting every baroque nuance of the music".

== Early career ==
Rolando Valdés-Blain was born in 1922 in Havana, Cuba and came to New York city as a child. He began his guitar studies with Julio Martínez Oyanguren, a Uruguayan guitarist. Valdés-Blain's first professional appearance in New York took place at 13 years of age. In the mid-1930s, Valdés-Blain was 16 when he was arguably the first in the U.S. to form a classical guitar duo with his brother Alberto. They were heard weekly on radio station WNYC. During World War II he served in Burma from 1942 to 1946. This allowed him to study, on the G.I. Bill, with Regino Sainz de la Maza at the Madrid Royal Conservatory, where he was awarded the Grand Prize for concert guitar playing. Joaquín Rodrigo was one of the judges.

== Teaching ==
From the 1930s into the 1950s, he taught at Greenwich House Music School. In the early 1960s he was vice-president and advisor of Velazquez Manuel Velazquez guitars and was founder of the Guitar Department at the Manhattan School of Music. His students include David Tanenbaum, Michael Laucke and Mark Delpriora.

== World tours ==
He toured internationally in Canada, Latin America, Asia and Spain at the Real Conservatory in Madrid. He also performed in the United States at Casa Americana, the Pan American Union (Washington, D.C.), Yale University, Carnegie Recital Hall and Town Hall (New York City), and the Ethical Culture Auditorium (Philadelphia). His performances included major radio networks in New York as well as in South America, most notably in Caracas, Venezuela, San Juan and Puerto Rico. Under the management of impresario Sol Hurok, Valdés-Blain performed as guitar accompanist with the Spanish Ballet Company in Canada, South America and in the United States. He appeared on stage on Broadway, including as the guitarist in Tennessee Williams's play Camino Real, directed by Elia Kazan, and he composed and performed the music for Leslie Stevens's Bullfight.

== United States ==
In 1955–56, Valdés-Blain appeared as a featured soloist with the Radio City Music Hall Symphony Orchestra under the direction of Raymond Page. This was one of the first times a classical guitarist played as a soloist together with a symphony orchestra. From 1964 through the mid-1980s, he continued to perform as guitar soloist with symphony orchestras, performing steadily at New York City Center with the Joffrey Ballet (choreographed by Gerald Arpino) in the perennial favorite Viva Vivaldi as well as in Benjamin Britten's Gloriana. He also performed Fanfarita by Chapi. The New York Times called his performance "a musical gem…reflecting every baroque nuance of the music".

Valdés-Blain recorded on various labels including Roulette Records, SMC Recordings and Decca Records where he accompanied violinist Ruggiero Ricci. In 1968, he was invited to give a Command performance at the White House for President Lyndon Johnson and King Olaf of Norway. Critiques took note. In 1967, The Philadelphia Inquirer praised Valdés-Blain as an "excellent guitarist …expressive beyond expectation" and a musician who "... meshed solo lines precisely and impassively spiced them with virtuoso playing that included even, clear trills. The orchestra dropped to a whisper to accommodate the soloist who developed the solo line firmly, even passionately." The Philadelphia Bulletin wrote that he was a "Nimble soloist (who) ... restored the guitar to its place as an instrument of delicacy and clarity."

== Legacy ==
Throughout his life-time, Valdés-Blain and his wife Joan maintained a close friendship with Carmen Amaya, who is arguably considered to be one of the greatest flamenco dancers of all time. In 2002, they were interviewed in the documentary Carmen Amaya: Queen of The Gypsies, about Amaya's life and art. Valdés-Blain had provided guitar accompaniment on her American tour and a close friendship united them. His brother, Alberto died in Spain in 2002.

For his "many contributions to the art of the classic guitar" the New York Society of The Classic Guitar presented Valdés-Blain with a Fellowship. Rolando was also an inventor who developed several innovations for the classical guitar. He held patents for a music stand and his Muffletone, a sound mute which allows for quiet practice in hotel rooms, for example. Articles have appeared "in recognition of distinguished musicianship and for many important contributions to the art of the guitar", stating that Valdés-Blain has left a rich legacy to the world of the classical guitar. He was a proponent of new compositions for guitar and made transcriptions of works for this instrument. In May 2011, Mark Delpriora performed a concert in memory of Valdes-Blain.

== See also ==
- List of classical guitarists
- List of flamenco guitarists
