= Mac AIDS Fund =

Charitable organization

M∙A∙C AIDS Fund (M·A·F)
- Founded: 1994
- Founder: Frank Toskan, Frank Angelo
- Type: Operating public charity
- Purpose: Humanitarianism
- Region served: Global
- Product: VIVA Glam
- Method: Funding direct care, Educational programs, prevention
- Owner: Estee Lauder
- Key people: Nancy Mahon, Esq., Executive Director, M·A·C AIDS Fund; Senior Vice President, M·A·C Cosmetics
- Website: www.macaidsfund.org

M∙A∙C AIDS Fund (M·A·F) is a public charity established in 1994 to support people living with HIV/AIDS worldwide. It donates funds to communities and organizations that offer services to people with HIV/AIDS and help to prevent the disease through educational programs. The fund is financed entirely by the sale of MAC Cosmetics' VIVA Glam products.

== History ==
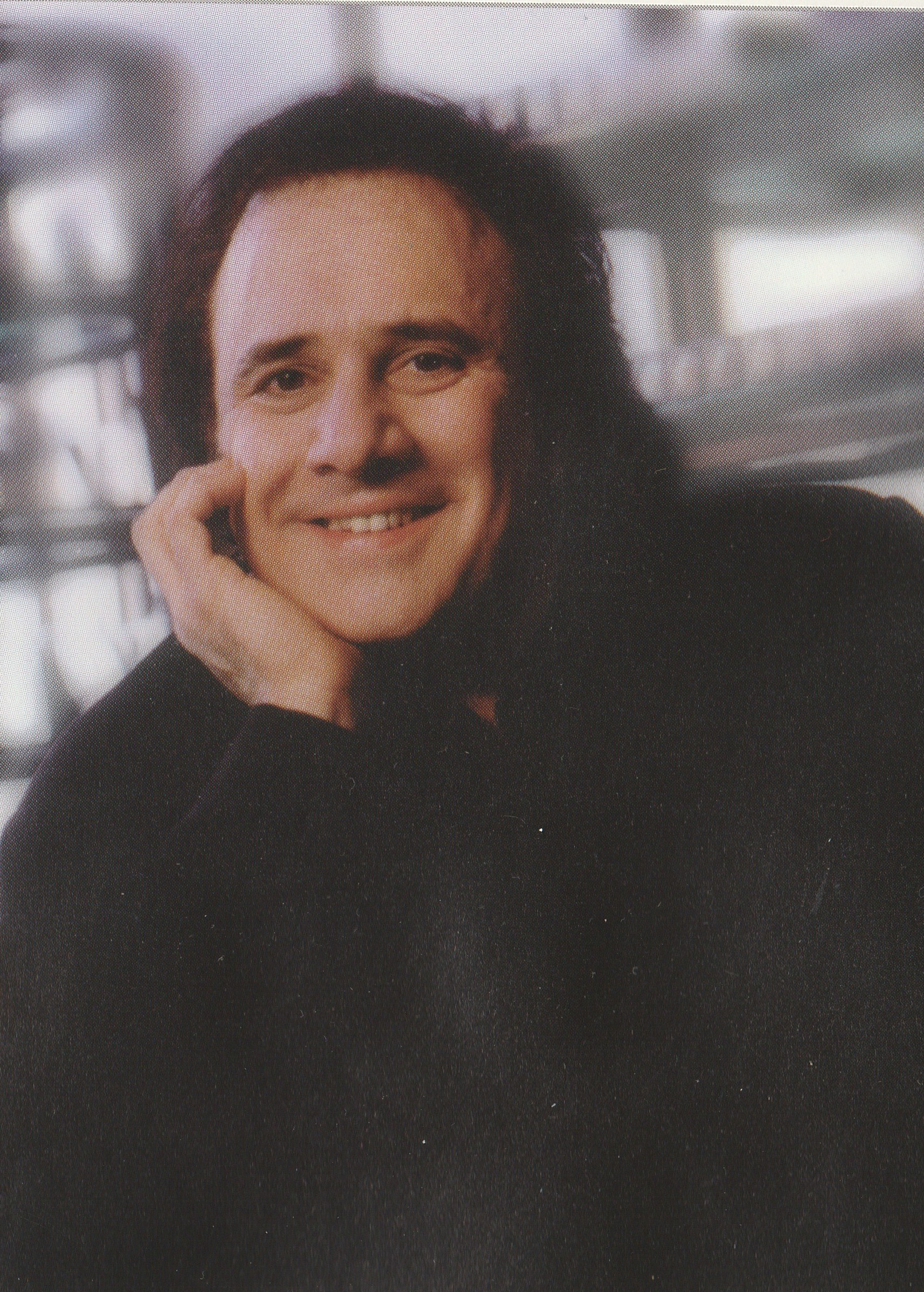
MAC Cosmetics and MAC AIDS Fund Creator Frank Angelo

The M∙A∙C AIDS Fund was established in Toronto in 1994 by Frank Angelo and Frank Toskan. In 1985 they had co-founded MAC Cosmetics, initially a manufacturer of make-up for models and professional make-up artists. The fund's income came primarily from the sales of its VIVA Glam product line and the sales of greeting cards designed by children with AIDS.

Among the other organizations with which the fund partners is the United Nations Foundation.

In 1994, Angelo and Toskan sold 51 percent of their business to Estée Lauder Companies who then completed their acquisition of the company in 1998. In its board meeting of April 2004, the Mac AIDS Fund directors comprised Ian Ness, Charles Richards, Frank Doyle, Michael Laucke, Bruce Hunter and John Demsey served as Chairman. As of 2015, John Demsey, the Group President of Estee Lauder Companies, serves as Chairman of the Mac AIDS Fund's Board of Directors.

== VIVA Glam ==
The M∙A∙C AIDS Fund is supported exclusively by the sales of the MAC Cosmetics VIVA Glam line which features lipsticks and lip glosses. MAC cosmetics donates 100% of the earnings to the fund which helps kids living with HIV around the globe .

In 2002, MAC Cosmetics also began to offer "Good Spirits" makeovers. The makeovers are free and designed to teach men and women, including transgender people, living with HIV/AIDS make-up skills that can make them look and feel better. Professional MAC make-up artists demonstrate techniques that can decrease the appearance of physical problems that may occur from medicine and treatment for HIV/AIDS.

=== Media campaigns ===
On World AIDS Day in November 2002, a showing of the film Pandemic: Facing AIDS by Rory Kennedy (sponsored in part by MAC cosmetics) took place at the United Nations Headquarters in New York.

In 2009, Fergie appeared on several magazine spreads for VIVA Glam. She also became the fund's spokesperson for the global youth prevention initiative.

The 2012 VIVA Glam spokespeople were Nicki Minaj and Ricky Martin, who is the first Latin American man to be asked to be a part of VIVA Glam. They both created their own VIVA Glam cosmetics, Minaj's being a light pink lipstick while Martin's was a lip conditioner. Minaj's lipstick becoming the best selling VIVA Glam lipstick of all time, and she was invited back to front the 2013 campaign solo. The 2014 VIVA Glam spokesperson was Rihanna, who raised 50 million for the MAC AIDS Fund. Miley Cyrus became the 2015 VIVA Glam spokesperson, going on to outsell Nicki Minaj's previous best of $350M by over $50M. Miley's 2015 campaign raised $400m.

=== Viva Glam Ambassadors ===
The very first Viva Glam ambassador was drag queen RuPaul. Some of the Viva Glam ambassadors include: k.d lang, Mary J. Blige (three campaigns), Lil' Kim, Elton John (two campaigns), Shirley Manson (two campaigns), Christina Aguilera, Pamela Anderson (two campaigns), Eve (two campaigns), Fergie (two campaigns), Cyndi Lauper, Lady Gaga (two campaigns), Ricky Martin, Nicki Minaj (two campaigns), Miley Cyrus (two campaigns), Ariana Grande (two campaigns), and Sia.
