= Sayyd Abdul Al-Khabyyr =

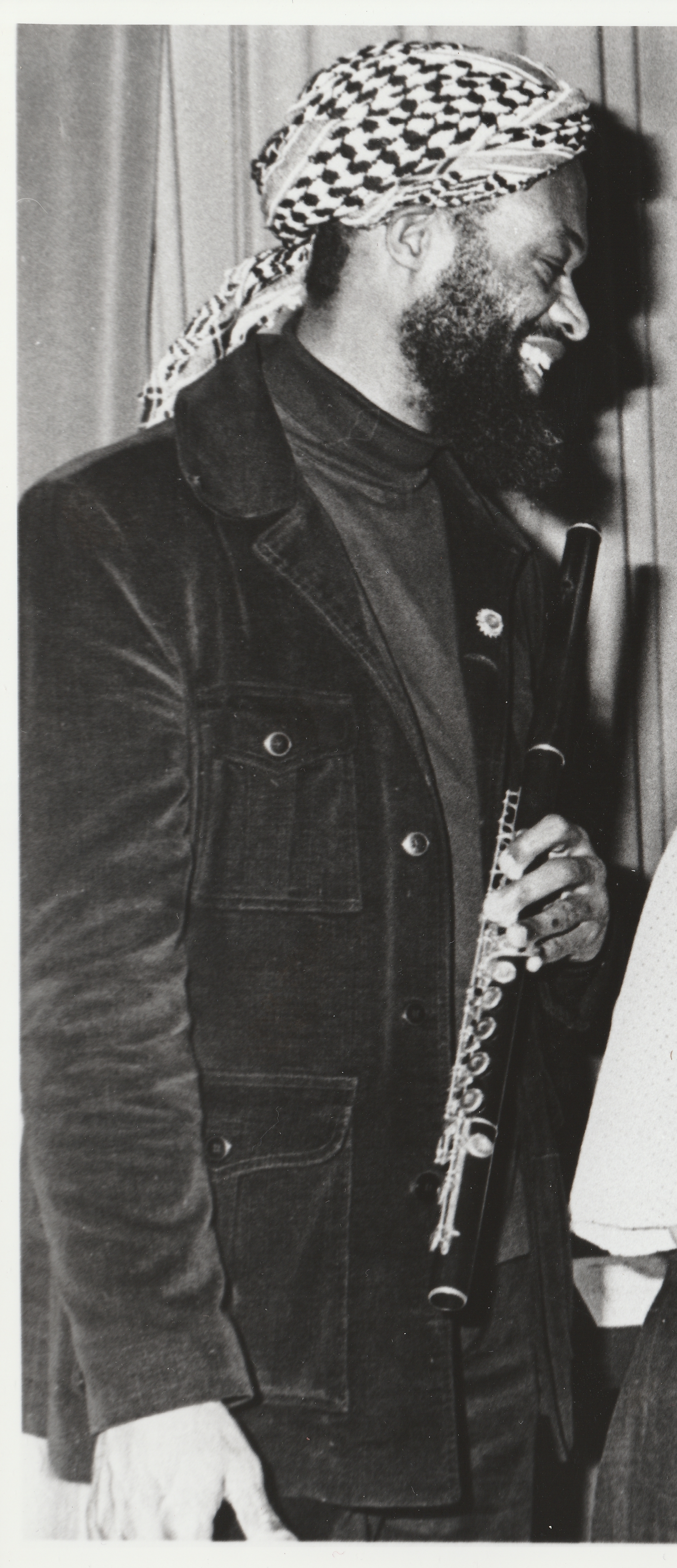

Background information
- Born: Russell Linwood Thomas; 22 March 1935; Harlem, New York U.S.
- Died: 15 February 2017 (aged 81) Montreal, Quebec, Canada
- Genres: Atonal; Blues; Classical music; Jazz
- Instruments: Clarinet; Flute; Piccolo; Saxophone; Piano
- Labels: Radio Canada International (RCI)
- Formerly of: Canadian Jazz Quartet; Dizzy Gillespie Orchestra; Duke Ellington Orchestra; Ottawa Saxophone Quartet; Trio 3

Al-Hajj Sayyd Abdul Al-Khabyyr (born Russell Linwood Thomas [Muslim name adopted in 1971]; 22 March 1935 – 15 February 2017), was an American Canadian saxophonist (soprano, alto, tenor and baritone), clarinetist, flautist (flute and piccolo) and composer. He toured internationally with Dizzy Gillespie from 1983 to 1987, appearing alongside Gillespie in the feature films A Night in Havana and A Night in Chicago. He is the only person to perform all saxophone parts consecutively in the Duke Ellington Orchestra.

On 26 June, 2011, a tribute concert was held during the Montreal International Jazz Festival to honour and recognize Abdul Al-Khabyyr's contributions to the Montreal jazz scene, as he was long considered the patriarch of Montreal's "second great family of Jazz".

== Music career ==
Born in Harlem, New York as Russell Linwood Thomas, Abdul Al-Khabyyr lived most of his life in Montreal, Quebec. He became a naturalized Canadian in 1965 and converted to Islam in 1971.

In his teens he studied clarinet and saxophone in New York City with Cecil Scott and others. In 1954 he traveled to Montreal with trombonist Snub Mosley to play in various nightclubs. While there he met his future wife and decided to stay, working with Al Cowans (1954–1955) and then leading his own band (1955–1957). In Ottawa from 1957 to 1970, he was a member at various times of the Canadian Jazz Quartet (with Richard Wyands on piano, Wyatt Ruther on bass, and Doug Johnston on drums), the Ottawa Saxophone Quartet and also studio/dance bands led by Champ Champagne, Buster Monroe and others. He led his own orchestra at the Gatineau Country Club from 1959 to 1965, except for a short break in 1963 as he recovered from a bout with Polio. He also appeared regularly on CBC programming as a guest or backing musician.

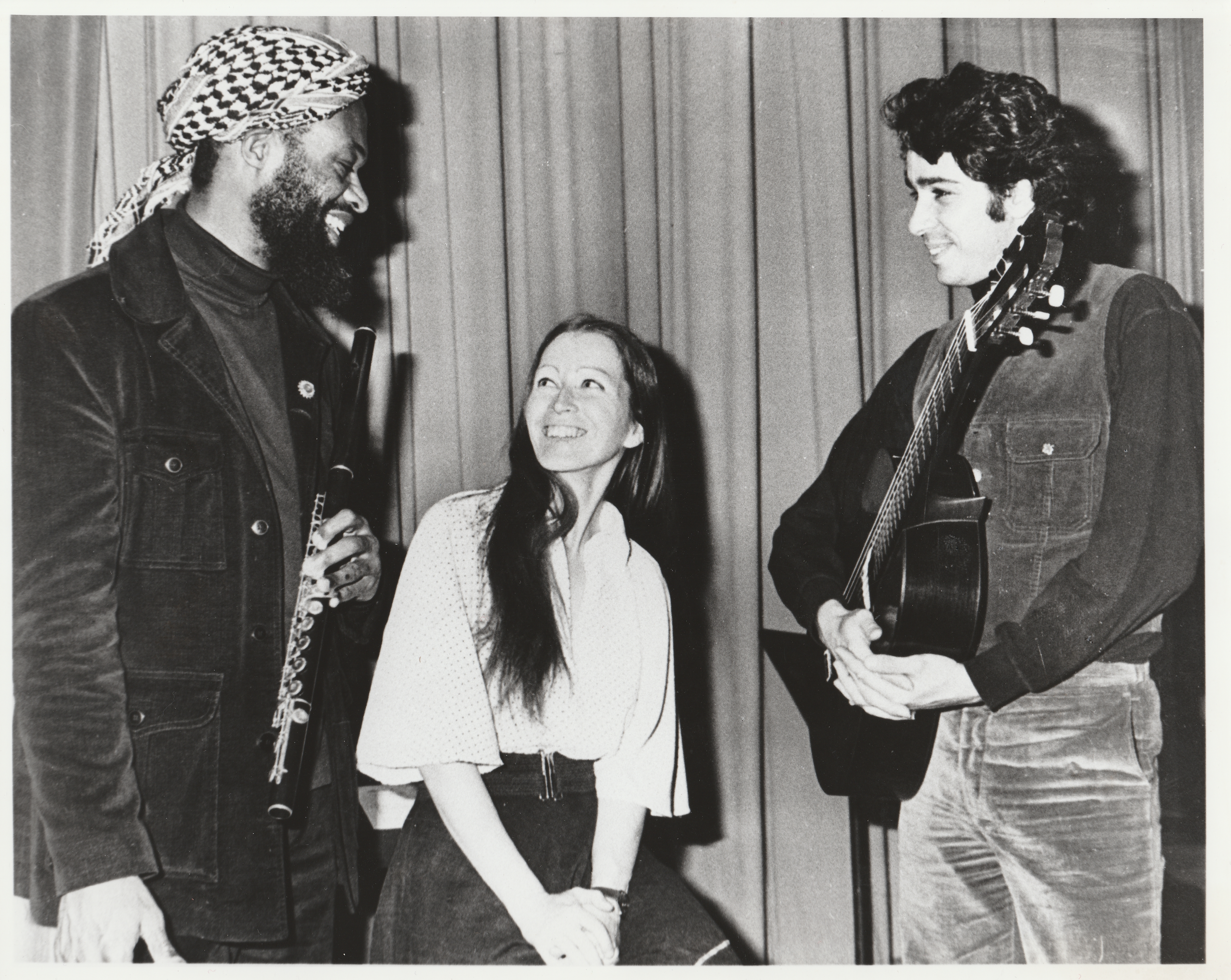
Trio 3 consisting of Sayyd Abdul Al-Khabyyr, Pauline Vaillancourt and Michael Laucke

From 1970 to 1980 he returned to Montreal as a teacher in the Jazz Music department of the Université de Montréal. His pupils included the flautist Jennifer Waring, trumpeter Chris Place, and saxophonists Mary-Jo Rudolf, Richard Beaudet and Rémi Bolduc. He also performed in various contemporary music settings such as the SMCQ ensemble (Société de musique contemporaine du Québec), Walter Boudreau's Infonie, Dionne-Brégent, TRIO 3 (composed of Sayyd, Pauline Vaillancourt and Michael Laucke), worked in studio and theatre orchestras, and played jazz at his own establishment, Café Mo-Jo.

He divided his time between Montreal and New York City during the 1980s, then settled in New York by the end of the decade. He was a member, from 1980 to 1982 and again from 1987 to 1993, of the Duke Ellington Orchestra. From 1983 to 1987, he was a member (along with his son Nasyr on drums) of the Dizzy Gillespie Quartet, touring internationally, and appearing alongside Gillespie in the feature films A Night in Havana and A Night in Chicago.

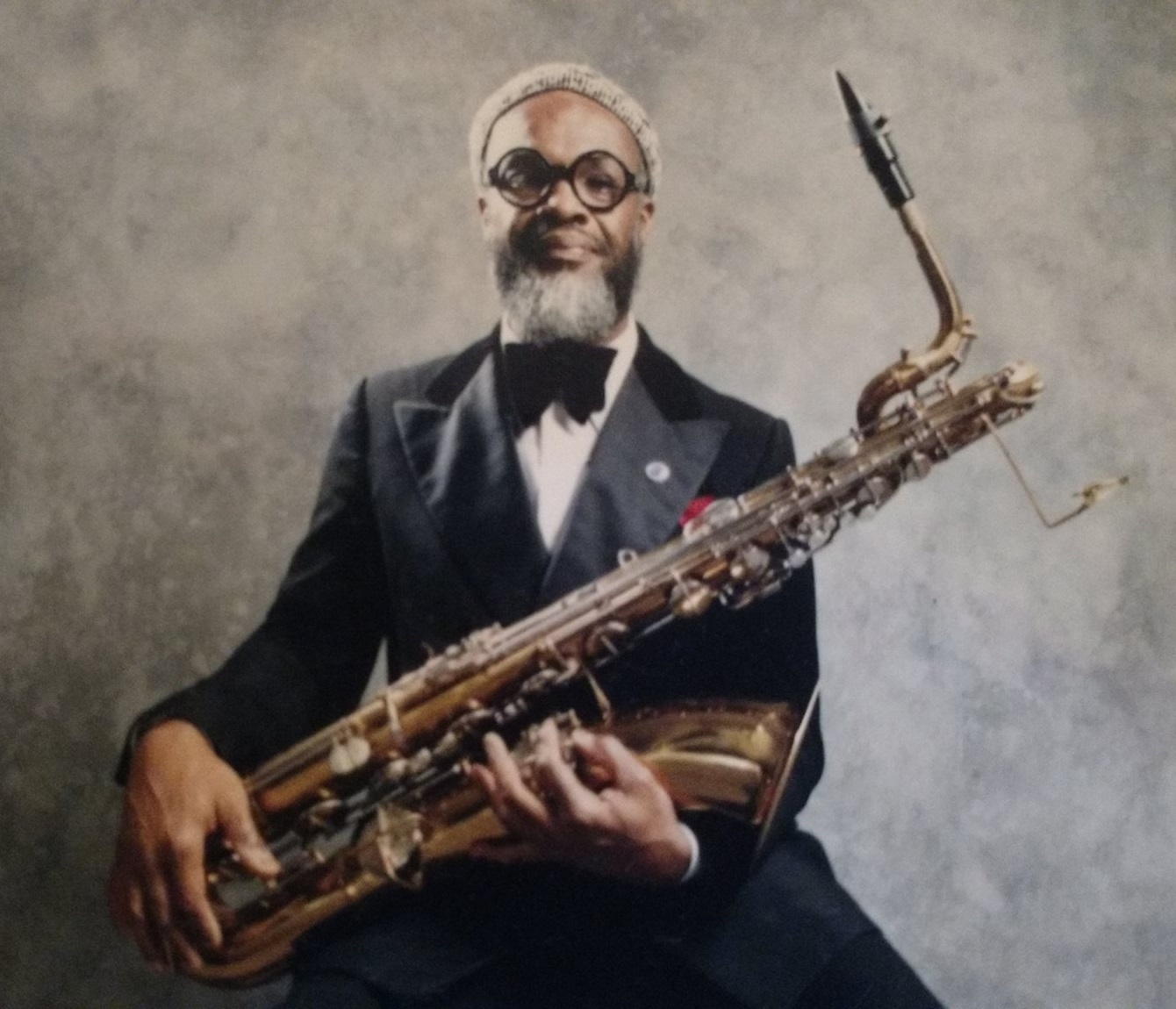
Sayyd Abdul Al-Khabyyr with one of his baritone saxophones.

He is the only person to perform all saxophone parts consecutively in the Duke Ellington Orchestra; Baritone sax, 2nd tenor, 1st tenor, 2nd alto, 1st alto and lead alto.

He also recorded and performed with, among many others; Tony Bennett, Tito Puente, Mario Rivera, the Savoy Sultans, Illinois Jacquet, the Afro-Asian Jazz Ensemble, Arturo Sandoval, Gonzalo Rubalcaba, Walter Davis Jr., Giovanni Hidalgo, Charlie Palmieri, Milt Jackson, Candido Gamero, Charlie Persip and Superband, Pharoah Sanders and Yusef Lateef.

In 1991 he was featured, along with Russian painter Evgeny Essaulenko, in a short film titled One Drinks the Other Doesn't.

He made several appearances accompanied by his sons and other musicians (including Oliver Jones) at the Festival International de Jazz de Montréal. On 26 June 2011, a tribute concert was held during the festival to honor and recognize Abdul Al-Khabyyr's contributions to the Montreal jazz scene.

== Personal life ==
Married in 1955 (jazz great Charlie Biddle served as best man), Abdul Al-Khabyyr and his wife had five children. Although all play musical instruments masterfully, two of his children, drummer Nasyr and trombonist Muhammad, followed in his footsteps and both became professional musicians and music teachers. Also notable, Abdul Al-Khabyyr is the father-in-law of Grammy Award-winning jazz musician Kenny Garrett.

In 1971, after reading the biography of Malcolm X, Abdul Al-Khabyyr and his family converted to Islam and he went on to become an Imam. Through their common faith Abdul Al-Khabyyr developed a friendship with boxing great Muhammad Ali, who would stay in his town of Mount Royal home when visiting the area.

In the late 1990s he moved back to Montreal and, after suffering strokes in 2001 and 2004, no longer performed.
