= John Burke (composer) =

Canadian composer (1951–2020)

John Joseph Burke (10 May 1951 – 18 January 2020) was a Canadian composer and music educator. As a composer he wrote mainly works for chamber ensembles, and his music displays an acute sensitivity to instrumental balance and timbre. In his early career he won the CBC National Radio Competition for Young Composers several times, including in 1978 for both Six Regions for piano (composed 1975) and Spectre for tenor instruments (composed 1976), and in 1980 for Firewind for two pianos (composed 1978) and Diffusa est gratia for a cappella choir (composed 1979). In 1995 he won the Jules Léger Prize for New Chamber Music for his String Quartet. Many of his compositions have been recorded, including Firewind by pianists Bruce Mather and Pierrette LePage, ...ascends at full moon by guitarist Michael Laucke, and À la source d'Hypocrène by the ensemble of the Société de musique contemporaine du Québec among others.

Burke was born in Toronto, and earned a Bachelor of Music in 1974 from McGill University, where he was a pupil of Bruce Mather and Alcides Lanza. Immediately following he entered the graduate music composition program at the University of Michigan (UM) where he obtained a Master of Music in 1976 and later a Doctor of Music in 1983. Among his teachers at the UM were William Albright, Leslie Bassett, William Bolcom, and George Balch Wilson. A grant from the Canada Council enabled him to pursue studies in France in 1978–1979 with Eugene Kurtz. In 1980 he worked at McGill University as a visiting professor in electronic music and music theory, returning to the UM in 1981 to pursue his doctoral degree. From 1983–1985 he was a member of the music faculty at McMaster University and in 1990 he joined the faculty at the University of Victoria. He died in Marmora, Ontario.
