= Flamenco Road =

2001 album by Michael Laucke

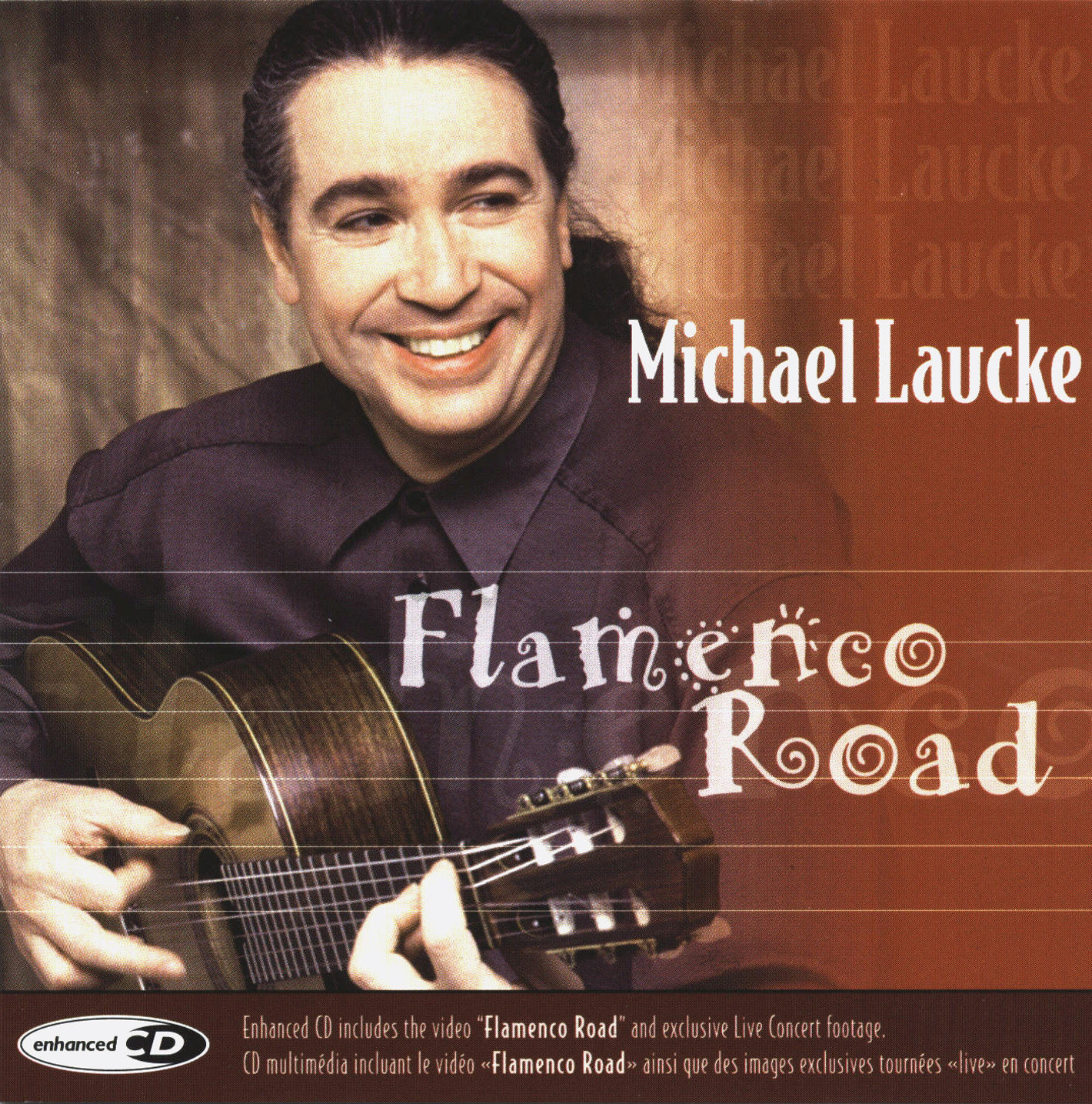

Studio album by Michael Laucke
- Released: 2001
- Genre: New flamenco
- Length: 42:35
- Label: Justin-Time
- Producer: Michael Laucke

Michael Laucke chronology
Michael Laucke & Fiesta Flamenco: Live	Flamenco Road	Michael Laucke ~ Flamenco Road 2

Flamenco Road is an album by Michael Laucke, released on September 12, 2001. The album consists mainly of his own compositions in the new flamenco style, which he also arranged. In an interview for Voir magazine, Laucke stated: "It is also very influenced by my classical background. So it's a smoother flamenco." An example of this style from the album can be heard in Laucke's treatment of the well-known classical guitar transcription "Leyenda", which is given a flamenco rendition using several percussion instruments (claves, maracas, special castanets mounted on wood blocks, chimes, and a large gong), bass, and flute.

Ten works were recorded at five different studios, each selected for its specific acoustics, in Montreal, Canada. The instrumentation for the recording's title piece, "Flamenco Road", required the use of a 24-track recording system; a Voir magazine article declared it to be the first recording in this style to employ 24 tracks. The instrumentation comprises a combination of four types of guitars—flamenco, Spanish, classical, and electric—and all natural acoustic guitars are played the Spanish way, using all the fingers of the right hand without a pick. The rhythm section includes "bongos, four congas, and a rock drum set blended with other percussion instruments such as claves, maracas, and castanets". It further incorporates "three dancers performing typical 'palmas' (hand-clapping) in synchronization", as well as three trumpets, three pianos, and a "country-style" violinist.

The enhanced CD includes two videos: one with interactive live concert footage filmed during Laucke's tenth season at Montreal's Place des Arts, and the other with the video clip of "Flamenco Road". The latter reached number one on video charts across Canada for five consecutive weeks. The Journal-Pioneer opined "Flamenco Road is an absolute joy to behold".

== Track listing ==
Excerpt from Flamenco Road song by Laucke in 24 track version, a sample of the (new flamenco) style

"Between Two Seas" ("Entre dos Aguas") by Paco de Lucía, arranged and played by Laucke

	Title	Timing	Composer
1.	Flamenco Road	3’18	Michael Laucke
2.	The Hero	5’07	Michael Laucke
3.	Between two Seas (Entre dos Aguas)	5’25	Paco de Lucia, arr. Laucke
4.	Danza	3’25	Michael Laucke)
5.	Wide River (Rio Ancho)	4’44	Paco de Lucia, arr. Laucke
6.	The Legend	6’52	Albeniz, arr. Laucke
7.	La Femme	6’05	Robert Coxon/Laucke
8.	Gymnopedie no. 1	2’55	Erik Satie, arr. Laucke
9.	Gymnopedie no. 2	2’27	Erik Satie, arr. Laucke
10.	Gymnopedie no. 3	2’03	Erik Satie, arr. Laucke

== Musicians ==
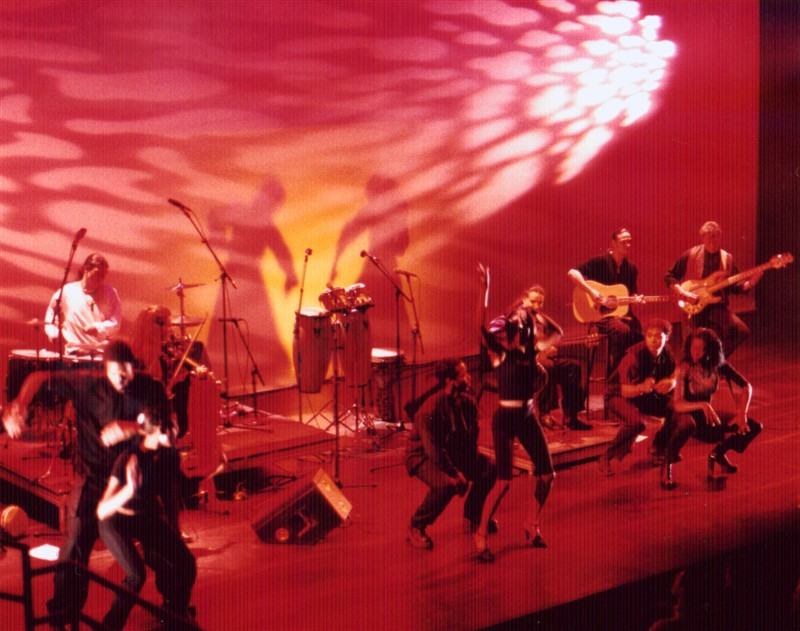
Laucke with the Flamenco Road Show at Place des Arts – Montreal

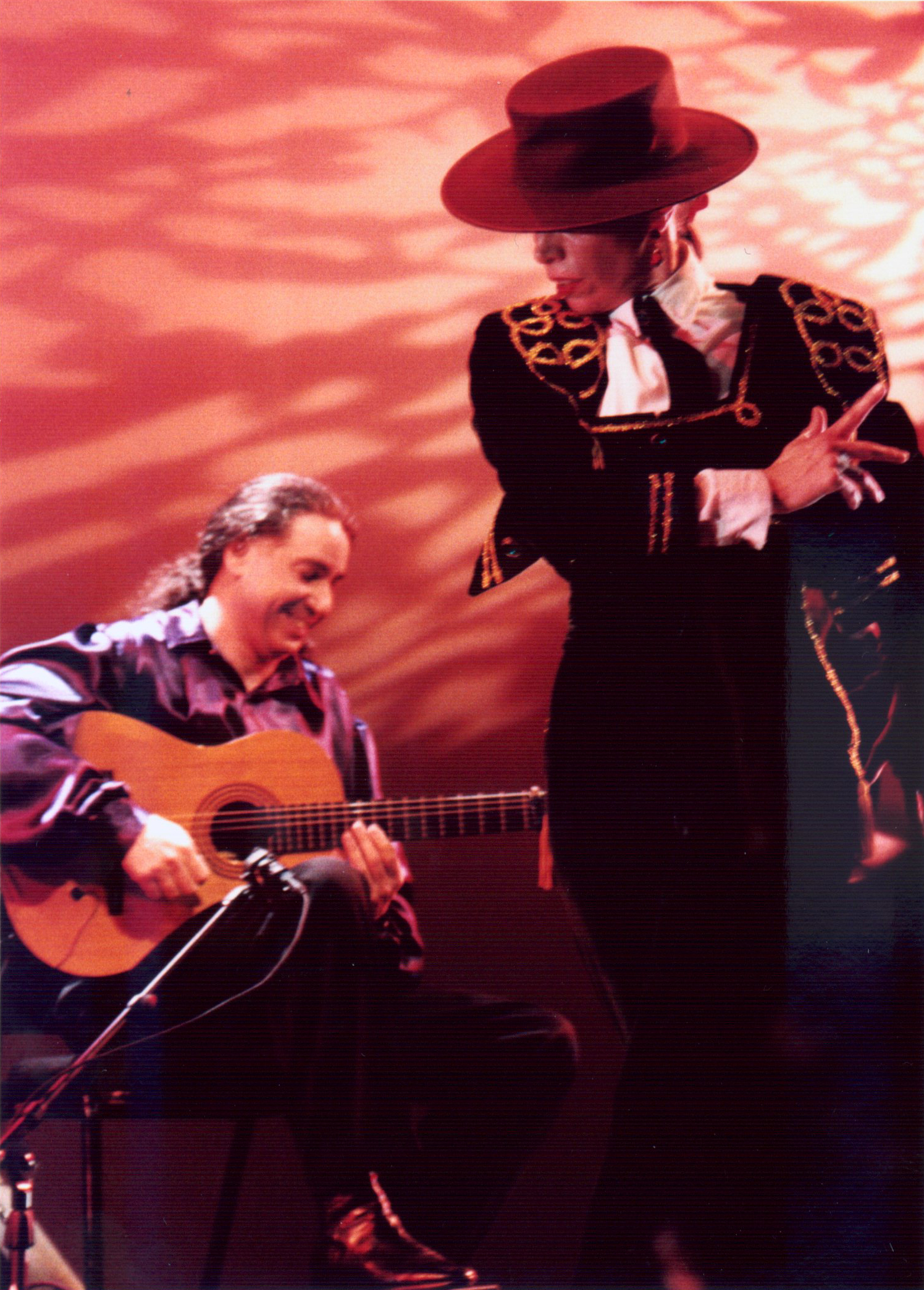
Michael Laucke and the Flamenco Road Show; dancer Daniela

- Michael Laucke – Spanish and classical guitars (solo, rhythm and fill tracks)
- Marie-Josée Guilbeault – violinist
- Oscar Martinez – Trumpets
- Paul Pivetta – electric guitar
- Réggie Larko – Falseta vocals and keyboards
- Rob Roy – Bass Guitar
- Robert Dethiers – Percussionist

== Production credits ==
Studio:	Terra Nova Studios & Créason (for Flamenco Road ), Montreal, Canada
Sound Engineer:	Pierpaolo (Paul) Pivetta and Jean-Guy Monpetit (Flamenco Road)
Mix:	Pierpaolo (Paul) Pivetta, Michael Laucke and Jean-Guy Monpetit (Flamenco Road)
Mastering:	Terra Nova Studios (Pierpaolo [Paul] Pivetta) and Sono Design (Carl Talbot) for Flamenco Road
Photos:	Stéphane Dumais (M.Laucke), Lorenna Solervicens (musicians and dancers)
ADAT Transfers:	François Licke
Design Coordinator:	Mike Henderson, Justin Time Records Inc. Montreal
Jacket Design:	Tom Krilly, Visual Communications Source, Montreal
Producer:	Michael Laucke
Official sponsor:	D’Addario guitar strings (D’Addario J45•Normal Tension and J29•Moderate Tension on Classical and Flamenco guitars respectively.)

=== Enhanced CD (multimedia) portion ===
Video production :
Artistic director:	Geneviève Blais
Final editing:	Jean-François Proteau, Michael Laucke
Photography director:	François Dagenais
Production:	Michèle Grondin & Denis Fortin
Production director:	Vicky Lessard
Production house:	Rafale Films, Montreal
Stylist:	José Cano
Video editing:	Patrick LaRoque
Video producer:	Jean-François (Jeff) Proteau

Multimedia production:
Audio resync:	Philippe Melançon, OBJECTIF, Montreal, Canada
Computer compiling:	Michael Laucke
Design coordinator:	Mike Henderson, Justin Time Records Inc. Montreal
DV transferring:	Philippe Melançon, CINOK, Montreal, Canada
Graphics:	Tom Krilly, Visual Communications Source, Montreal
Multimedia compiling:	Michael Laucke

== Media ==
=== Audio ===
"Asturias" (Leyenda), arranged, transcribed and performed on guitar by Laucke
"Asturias" (Leyenda)
This flamenco rendition uses bass, flute, and several percussion instruments (claves, maracas, special castanets mounted on wood blocks, chimes and a large gong).

Trois Gymnopedies by Eric Satie, transcribed and performed on guitar by Laucke
"Gymnopédie no. 1"

"Gymnopédie no. 2"

"Gymnopédie no. 3"

=== Video ===
FLAMENCO ROAD Video Clip with Laucke
An example of a new flamenco composition using 24 tracks.
