= David Tanenbaum (guitarist) =

American classical guitarist

David Tanenbaum (born September 10, 1956) is an American classical guitarist.

== Career ==
Tananbaum was born in New York.

Tanenbaum made his concert debut at the age of 16. He later studied guitar privately with Rolando Valdés-Blain in New York City. He has since become known as an enthusiastic promoter of new music for his instrument, although his repertoire also includes much music from other periods. Among other works, he has premiered Hans Werner Henze's concerto An eine Aeolsharfe (1985-6) and Peter Maxwell Davies's Sonata (1984).

Since the 1980s, he has taught at the San Francisco Conservatory of Music.

He has recorded two versions of Henze's enormous Royal Winter Music cycle (1976–79), as well as the complete guitar works of Lou Harrison and Terry Riley. His discography also includes music by John Adams, William Bolcom, Alan Hovhaness, Aaron Jay Kernis, Jorge Liderman, Peter Scott Lewis, Ástor Piazzolla, Steve Reich and Michael Tippett, as well as transcriptions of lute music by J. S. Bach, John Dowland, Francesco da Milano and Sylvius Leopold Weiss.

== Bibliography ==
- David Tanenbaum, "Leo Brouwer's 20 estudios sencillos" / David Tanenbaum; edited by Jim Ferguson. Publisher: San Francisco : Guitar Solo Publications; Chester, NY : U.S. & Canadian distribution by Music Sales, c1992. English Physical Details: 37 p. : ill.; 31 cm. Instruction and study. ISBN 0-9627832-3-4
