= David M. Tanenbaum =

American experimental physicist

David M. Tanenbaum is an American experimental physicist whose research involves surface science. He is the Osler-Loucks Professor in Science at Pomona College in Claremont, California.

== Career ==
Tanenbaum joined the Pomona College faculty in 1997. In July 2022, he was appointed the Osler-Loucks Professor in Science, an endowed chair.
