= Eric McLean =

- Born: 25 September 1919
- Origin: Canada
- Died: 19 August 2002 (aged 82)
- Occupations: Pianist, music critic, historian
- Instrument: Piano

Eric McLean (25 September 1919 – 19 August 2002) was a Canadian pianist, music critic, and historian. From 1979 to 1988 he was the music critic for the Montreal Gazette in Canada, and retired as their critic emeritus. His overall career spanned 60 years.

In April 2003, McLean's personal papers were donated to the Marvin Duchow Music Library at McGill University. The Eric McLean Collection is a multimedia assemblage of texts, photographs, recorded interviews, musical scores, musicological monographs, and an LP record collection of over 7,000 items. The collection includes the concert diary inherited by McLean from Hugh Poynter Bell, former Montreal Star music and art critic. The diary shows Montreal concert life during the period of 1923–1949 and consists of his concert reviews which highlight the importance of Montreal, during the first half of the twentieth century, as a major North American musical centre.

== Works ==
"Hanslick had it better", World of Music, vol 14, No. 3, 1972

"Eric McLean remembers", Music McGill, spring 1992

== Bibliography ==
- McGill: A celebration, Music McGill, Spring 1992
- "Eric McLean at Papineau House", Montreal Gazette, 3 September 1995
- Music archives ~ National Library of Canada
