= The Music Scene (magazine) =

Canadian magazine dedicated to promoting classical music

La Scena Musicale (The Music Scene)
- English-language cover of La Scena Musicale Vol. 28 Iss. 6, 2023
- Publisher & Editor: Wah Keung Chan
- Categories: Music magazine
- Frequency: Bi-monthly
- Circulation: 25,000
- First issue: September 1996
- Country: Canada
- Based in: Montreal
- Language: English and French
- Website: myscena.org; scena.org (old portal)
- ISSN: 1703-8189
- OCLC: 50928510

The Music Scene (Italian: La Scena Musicale) is a Canadian bilingual quarterly magazine that promotes classical music in Canada. The magazine was established by Wah Keung Chan in September 1996. Each issue contains a comprehensive calendar of concerts, CD, DVD and book reviews, interviews with musicians as well as feature articles on the local, national and international classical music scenes.

It is a free magazine published at least six times a year. 42,000 copies are distributed in total: 18,000 in Ontario, 5,000 copies each in Winnipeg, Edmonton and Calgary, and 9000 copies in British Columbia.

La Scène musicale/The Music Scene is their all-English version of the magazine, while their free monthly magazine is bilingual (English & French). The English version was started in 2002.

The Music Scene is non-profit and has both an online and printed version which is distributed across Canada with emphasis in the Montreal, Quebec City and Ottawa-Gatineau regions. Copies are also sent to music schools and record stores. An electronic version is available on their website.

In 2021, the magazine launched its new online portal, mySCENA.

== The Next Great Art Song ==
In July 2015, La Scena Musicale launched a Canadian art song competition called The Next Great Art Song to promote vocal music. The competition has two phases. The first is a month-long survey of musicologists, theorists, music critics, and performers from Canada and around the world on the topic of their three favourite art songs. The second phase is an art song composition competition for Canadian composers, which will be evaluated by experts and the public.

Following the completion of the two phases, the top ten favourite art songs from the first phase and the top ten submissions from the composition competition will be featured in a gala concert of Canadian musicians, the location of which is still to be determined.
