= Michel Gonneville =

Canadian composer (born 1950)

Michel Gonneville (born 31 July 1950) is a Canadian composer.

== Career ==
He completed his Bachelor of Music at the Conservatoire Vincent-d'Indy in Sherbrooke in 1972, where he won the premier prix in analysis and composition. He completed a Doctor of Music at the University of Montreal in 1997. From 1975 to 1978 he won grants to study in Europe, where he took Stockhausen's composition courses and participated in the electronic music studio of Hans Ulrich Humpert.

Returning to Canada in 1978, he became a teacher at the Rimouski Conservatoire, and then the University of Ottawa. His work "Chute-parachute" "was a recommended work at the International Rostrum of Composers and has become one of [his] most frequently played compositions." In 1994, he won the Serge Garant prize, which is awarded by the Émile Nelligan Foundation.
