= Sonic Arts Network =

Sonic Arts Network was a UK-based organisation, established in 1979, that aimed to enable both audiences and practitioners to engage with the art of sound through a programme of festivals, events, commissions and education projects. Its honorary patron was Karlheinz Stockhausen. At time of founding in 1979 it was known as the Electroacoustic Music Association of Great Britain (EMAS), changing its name to Sonic Arts Network in 1989.

On 1 October 2008 the Sonic Arts Network merged with the Society for the Promotion of New Music, the British Music Information Centre (BMIC) and the Contemporary Music Network to create a new organisation to promote contemporary Music in the UK called Sound and Music.

Sonic Arts Network's activities were separated into three main areas:

- Activities – Events, regular festivals such as Cut and Splice and Expo, tours and commissions.
- Education – national education project Sonic Postcards, artist workshops and talks.
- Network – Sonic Arts Network was a membership organisation that acted as a hub of information, opportunities and publications for the UK sonic arts scene.

== Activities ==
Every year, Sonic Arts Network produced a number of nationwide commissions and projects in partnership with funding agencies, sponsors, broadcasters and venues. The aim of these activities was to bring some of the best new and existing work by sound artists from around the world to the UK. Sonic Arts Network's main activities included: Cut and Splice, Expo festival, Beach Singularity and Vacant Space.

=== Cut and Splice ===
Cut and Splice is a festival of experimental electronic music that brings together international artists to premiere new work or recreate seminal historical pieces. First held in 2003, it is presented in association with BBC Radio 3 and has continued under the Sound And Music name after Sonic Arts Network was merged into the latter organisation.

The event has previously featured Bernard Parmegiani, François Bayle, Yasunao Tone and Ars Electronica Prize-winner Eliane Radigue. Some of the artists featured in Cut and Splice Acousmonium 2006 at the ICA included Russell Haswell, John Wall, Hecker, Michel Chion, Christian Zanési, Philip Jeck, Carl Michael von Hausswolff, Zbigniew Karkowski and Hans-Joachim Roedelius.

=== Expo Festival ===
Beginning in 1997 as a conference and renamed in 2004, Expo festival was Sonic Arts Network's annual festival representing the experimental music and sound art scene in the UK, held in a different UK location each year. Free and open to the public, the event mobilised a national network of artists and engaged with communities from all backgrounds – placing sonic art and the people who make it, in direct contact with the public.

Expo 2006 explored the inner, outer and public spaces of Manchester. The festival included sound installations at the Cornerhouse by Berlin-based sound art collective Staalplaat Soundsystem who presented The Ultrasound of Therapy; Bob Levene's newly commissioned work The Space Between – Experiments for Speakers, Helmut Lemke's new work KLANGELN 7, and the art collective Owl Project performed a work called Sound Lathe. There was also a performance by Norwegian female electro/instrumental improv group SPUNK and Birmingham sound arts activists Dreams of Tall Buildings performing the first graphic score in 40 years by Fluxus artist and founder of the band The United States of America, Joseph Byrd. Victoria Baths, winner of BBC's 2004 Restoration competition, saw over 600 people attend a day of site-specific happenings titled that utilised the spaces and acoustics of the listed building with a programme of performances and installations.

Expo 2007 was held in Plymouth and was presented in partnership with the University of Plymouth's i-DAT (Institute of Digital Art and Technology). Over the weekend of 22–25 June 2007 performances, exhibitions and presentations took place at a variety of public venues in Plymouth including outdoor performance spaces, club space and a historic architectural space, as well as online.

Expo 2008 was held in Brighton and featured artists including Stephan Mathieu and Aleks Kolkowski, Blood Stereo, DJ Scotch Egg, and John Wall. Works included a radiophonic intervention in the Royal Pavilion Gardens and an unconference in the form of a 'wiki-conference' at the University of Brighton.

In 2009, Expo (hosted under the new organisation name Sound And Music) took place in locations across Leeds, again including an unconference and featured artists including Christina Kubisch.

=== Beach Singularity ===
Beach Singularity is a celebration of the British seaside. Set in an afternoon, the piece involves hundreds of holidaymakers of all ages in a bizarre and creative performance featuring a marching band, interactive electronic sound, beach activities and sound games. Composed and devised by Trevor Wishart, Beach Singularity received its first performances on the beaches of Morecambe, Cleveleys, St. Annes, and Southport in the summer of 1977 as part of the Queen's Silver Jubilee celebrations. Supported by Contemporary Music Network (CMN), Beach Singularity toured three seaside towns in August 2007.

=== Commissions ===
Sonic Arts Network aimed to support the development of both emerging and established artists in the UK through a rolling programme of commissions of new work for performance and installation across the UK. Artists commissioned included Kaffe Matthews, Justin Bennett, People Like Us, Ergo Phizmiz, Dreams of Tall Buildings and Bob Levene.

== Education ==
Sonic Arts Network undertook its first formal education project at the 1989 Huddersfield Contemporary Music Festival pioneered by Robert Worby and Ian Dearden with composer John Cage. After the appointment of Paul Wright as Education Officer in 1990 Sonic Arts Network provided projects for the South Bank Centre, The Science Museum, Canary Wharf, Birmingham's Symphony Hall, many other venues in the UK and in Budapest and Tokyo. Electroacoustic composers involved included Robert Worby, Trevor Wishart, Stephen Montague, Alistair MacDonald, Duncan Chapman and Peter Cusack as well as video artist Stewart Collinson and poet Matthew Sweeney. In 2000 Sonic Arts Network led the education programme for Sonic Boom at London's Hayward Gallery.

=== Sonic postcards ===
The main branch of Sonic Arts Network's recent Education programme was Sonic postcards which aimed to explore and compare the local sound environments of young people across the UK; the impact of sound on our lives; and the possibilities for creativity through the interaction of these sounds with the internet. 52 schools from across the UK took part in its first year.

The project was aimed at pupils between the ages of 9–14 in primary, secondary and special schools. Each project provided pupils with the opportunity to record and gather sounds to use as the basis of their sonic postcards. The pupils became sound designers by composing and structuring their own sonic postcards which were emailed to other schools that participated in the project. All the sonic postcards were then uploaded to the Sonic postcards website.

== Network ==
Sonic Arts Network was a membership organisation with over 600 members. This community of artists, organisations and the wider public with an interest in sound art and experimental music was served by the Sonic Arts Network through a combination of online services, performance, exhibition and educational opportunities and a range of specially curated CDs and newsletters.

=== CD series ===
These guest-curated CD were released several times a year; accompanying the aural element of the publication was a richly produced booklet that often underpinned and contextualised the themes explored on the CD.

Issues were curated by Nicolas Collins, editor-in-chief of the Leonardo Music Journal and Chair of the Department of Sound at the School of the Art Institute of Chicago, who developed a theme based around silence. Kenny Goldsmith, a writer, poet and founder of UbuWeb, who trawled his archives to create a compilation of sound poetry. Japanese performance artist, Junko Wada curated a deeply personal selection of music, produced by a process of curation, performance and collaboration. Professor Andrew Hugill explored the French absurdist movement 'Pataphysics – a CD which travels from unheard Soft Machine tracks, Marcel Duchamp and Gavin Bryars and through to Frank Zappa's former lover, Nigey Lennon and a piece of silence that predates John Cage by 70 years by Alphonse Allais. Ben Watson delivered a post-Allais polemic through a disgruntled whiny from the Esemplasm. Tim Steiner's Big Ears unearthed the lost art of Radio broadcasting and Irwin Chusid, broadcaster and author of Songs in the Key of Z, delivered DIY and outsider nuggets.

The series includes The Topography of Chance by Stewart Lee, comedian and writer of Jerry Springer: The Opera. The CD explores spoken word, music and sound that all include some chance element in their creation.

The last in the series was curated by Andrew Kötting, A psyche and its geography. Inside Out. The series was produced in co-operation with London-based German graphic-designer Joerg Hartmannsgruber.

== See also ==
- Electronic art music
- Sound art
- Experimental music
