= Sound diffusion =

Sound diffusion (sometimes referred to simply as 'diffusion') is a performance practice in the field of acousmatic music. According to composer and theorist Denis Smalley, it describes the "projection and the spreading of sound in an acoustic space for a group of listeners" during a concert. These concerts can be seen as acoustic recitals without performers, where sound is exclusively generated by loudspeakers. In many cases, the sound diffusion is performed by the composer themselves, whose task it is to integrate and interpret the music within the concert space.

The practice was originally formulated by composer Pierre Henry and based on the diffusion of a stereo signal to multiple loudspeakers using a special mixing desk. Differing from the spatial sound approach adopted by Stockhausen and others, the loudspeaker orchestra consisted of a diverse range of speakers, specifically chosen for their diverse tonal characteristics. The aim of the diffusion is to “exaggerate the dynamic, spectral and spatial content of the musical material already present in the work.”

The technical limitations of magnetic tape (such as tape noise or limited spectral range) required the intervention of an engineer in the systems’ early history. These technical considerations would eventually include the diffusion process. The first formalized system based on this approach was the Acousmonium of the Groupe de Recherches Musicales (GRM), the collective founded by Pierre Schaeffer and Pierre Henry in 1958. Modern diffusion practice also tries to articulate musical material by playing different passages through different sounding pairs of speakers. Composers generally do not provide a score or notation that determines how the diffusion should be done precisely. It is up to the diffusion engineer to perform the piece in such a way that the musical content is adequately interpreted as well as adjusted to the specific loudspeaker arrangement and acoustics of the respective concert hall.

== See also ==
- Birmingham ElectroAcoustic Sound Theatre
- Musique concrète
- Sound engineering
- Sound art
- Sound collage
