= Symphonie pour un homme seul =

Symphonie pour un homme seul (Symphony for One Man Alone) is a musical composition by Pierre Schaeffer and Pierre Henry, composed in 1949–1950. It is an important early example of musique concrète.

The Symphonie was premiered at a concert on 18 March 1950. Comprising twenty-two movements of music produced using turntables and mixers, it was difficult to perform due to technical problems. The number of movements was reduced to 11 for a broadcast in 1951, and then to 12 for the revised 1966 version by Henry. The revised version was used for the Pierre Schaeffer – L'oeuvre musicale recordings. Its movements are as follows:

1. Prosopopée I
2. Partita
3. Valse
4. Erotica
5. Scherzo
6. Collectif
7. Prosopopée II
8. Eroïca
9. Apostrophe
10. Intermezzo
11. Cadence
12. Strette

Schaeffer started developing the idea of a "symphony of noises" (Symphonie de bruits) soon after he established his studio (Studio d'Essai) at RTF (now ORTF). He sketched ideas for sound materials in his journal. He later described the completed work as "an opera for blind people, a performance without argument, a poem made of noises, bursts of text, spoken or musical." In the 1952 work À la recherche d'une musique concrète he commented thus on the nature of the Symphonie:

The lone man should find his symphony within himself, not only in conceiving the music in abstract, but in being his own instrument. A lone man possesses considerably more than the twelve notes of the pitched voice. He cries, he whistles, he walks, he thumps his fist, he laughs, he groans. His heart beats, his breathing accelerates, he utters words, launches calls and other calls reply to him. Nothing echoes more a solitary cry than the clamour of crowds.

== Legacy ==
Excerpts of the piece were debuted in the United States on 14 June 1952 as a prelude to a Boston production of Kurt Weil and Bertolt Brecht's Threepenny Opera. Reporting on the performance, DownBeat wrote that the piece "was played on a sound track compounded of an amazing variety of 'concrete' sounds from trains to the magnified beat of a cricket's heart and truncated cadences of the human voice. Audience reaction was at best bewildered, most agreeing it was certainly concrete, but wondering where the music was. Although most consider this "not music" many enjoy sitting down and listening to their hearts content."
