= Éliane Radigue =

French composer (1932–2026)

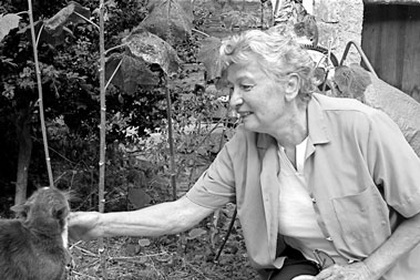
- Radigue and her cat

Background information
- Born: Éliane Louise Thérèse Radigue; January 24, 1932; Paris, France
- Died: February 23, 2026 (aged 94) Paris, France
- Genres: Classical music; electronic; drone; minimalism; musique concrète
- Years active: 1950s–2026
- Labels: Lovely Music Ltd, Important Records, shiiin records, Table of the Elements

Éliane Louise Thérèse Radigue (January 24, 1932 – February 23, 2026) was a French composer. She began working in the 1950s and her first compositions were presented in the late 1960s. Until 2000, her work was almost exclusively created with the ARP 2500 modular synthesizer and tape. Beginning in 2001, she composed mainly for acoustic instruments, with a particular focus on music that is orally transmitted rather than notated.

== Background ==
Radigue was born in Paris on January 24, 1932, to Germaine Radigue (née Lubain) and Clément Radigue, a shopkeeper. She was raised in Paris in the vicinity of Les Halles market. In 1953, she married Armand Fernandez, later known as an artist under the name Arman, with whom she lived in Nice while raising their three children, before returning to Paris in 1967. She had studied piano and was already composing before hearing a broadcast by the founder of musique concrète Pierre Schaeffer. She soon met him, and in the early '50s became his student, working periodically at the Studio d'Essai during visits to Paris. In the early 1960s, she was assistant to Pierre Henry, creating some of the sounds which appeared in his works. As her own work matured, Schaeffer and Henry felt that her use of microphone feedback and long tape loops (as heard in Vice-Versa and Feedback Works 1969-1970) was moving away from their ideals, though her practice was still related to their methods.

Radigue died from complications after a fall in Paris, on February 23, 2026, at the age of 94.

== Career ==
=== 1955–1957: Apprenticeship in musique concrète ===
Radigue's initial education on electroacoustic music was from composer Pierre Schaeffer, to whom she was introduced via radio broadcasts of his music. After meeting him in person through a mutual friend, Radigue started her music education under Schaeffer and Pierre Henry at Studio d'Essai de la Radiodiffusion Nationale in Paris in 1955. At the institution, Radigue was trained on tape music techniques as a part of her education in musique concrète. Radigue described the experience of working in the Groupe de Recherche de Musique Concrète as eye-opening, as it introduced her to the idea that any sounds were able to be considered musical. However, she also described her early music to be paralleled from the practice as both of her educators disfavored electronic music over musique concrète principles.

=== 1960s: Tape feedback ===
Radigue left Studio d'Essai due to the need to support her children's education. As she lost access to studios and equipment, she pursued music education on classical composition, harp, and piano. In 1967, Radigue reconnected with Pierre Henry and started to work as his assistant at Studio Apsome. During this time, she developed a particular interest in tape feedback technique, as it fit her sonic vision of minuscule developments over an extended time. After a year, Radigue resigned and started her professional music career, primarily working within the tape editing medium.

=== 1970s–1990s: Experiments with synthesizers ===
Around 1970, Radigue created her first synthesizer-based music in a studio she shared with Laurie Spiegel on a Buchla synthesizer installed by Morton Subotnick at NYU. (Chry-ptus dates from this time.) Her goal at this point was to create a slow, purposeful "unfolding" of sound through the use of analogue synthesizers and magnetic tape, with results she felt to be closer to the minimal composers of New York at the time than to the French musique concrète composers who had been her previous allies. She experimented with Buchla and Moog synthesizers before finding in the ARP 2500 synthesizer the vehicle she would use exclusively for the next 25 years in forging her characteristic sound, beginning with Adnos I (1974). After that work's premiere at Mills College at the invitation of Terry Riley, a group of visiting French music students spoke to her about Tibetan Buddhism, a subject she found fascinating and began investigating upon her return to Paris.

In the 1970s, Radigue was romantically involved with pianist and composer Gérard Frémy. Her piece Geelriandre (1972) was dedicated to Frémy, and featured him on prepared piano, one of the rare appearances of the instrument in her catalog.

=== Buddhist influence ===
After investigating Tibetan Buddhism, she quickly converted and spent the next three years devoted to its practice under her guru Tsuglak Mawe Wangchuk (considered the tenth incarnation of Pawo Rinpoche), who subsequently sent her back to her musical work. She returned to composition, picking up where she left off, using the same working methods and goals as before, finishing Adnos II in 1979 and Adnos III in 1980. Then came a series of works dedicated to Milarepa, the Tibetan yogi, known for his Hundred Thousand Songs representing the basis of his teaching. First she composed the Songs of Milarepa, followed by Jetsun Mila, an evocation of the life of this master; the creation of these works was sponsored by the French government.

In the late 1980s and early 1990s, she devoted herself to a singular three-hour work. Considered to be her masterpiece, the Trilogie de la Mort was released in 1998; the first part kyema Intermediate states follows the path of the continuum of the six states of consciousness. The work was influenced as much by the Bardo Thodol (also known as Tibetan Book of the Dead) and her meditation practice, as by the deaths of Tsuglak Mawe Wangchuk and of her son Yves Arman. The first third of the Trilogie, "Kyema", was her first recording to be released on Phill Niblock's XI label. In his AllMusic review, "Blue" Gene Tyranny described Trilogie de la Mort as a "profound work of electronic music".

=== 2000–2026: Acoustic works ===
In 2000, she made her last electronic work in Paris, L'Ile Re-sonante, for which she received the Golden Nica Award at the festival Ars Electronica in 2006.

In 2001, on request from electric bassist and composer Kasper T. Toeplitz, she created her first instrumental work, Elemental II, which she took up again with The Lappetites, a laptop improvisation group comprising Antye Greie/AGF, Kaffe Matthews and Ryoko Akama. She participated in their first album Before the Libretto on the Quecksilber label in 2005.

From 2004, she dedicated herself to works for acoustic instruments. First with the American cellist Charles Curtis, the first part of Naldjorlak was premiered in December 2005 in New York and later played in 25 concerts across the U.S. and Europe. The second part of Naldjorlak for the two basset horn players Carol Robinson and Bruno Martinez, was created in September 2007 at the Aarau Festival (Switzerland). The three musicians completed the third part of Naldjorlak with Radigue and premiered the complete work, "Naldjorlak I,II,III", in Bordeaux on January 24, 2009. In June 2011, her composition for solo harp Occam I, written for the harpist Rhodri Davies, was premiered in London. Numerous solos and ensemble pieces in the OCCAM cycle have followed.

In January 2025, Radigue's new collaborative work OCCAM DELTA XXIII, created with Carol Robinson and Ensemble Klang, premiered at the London Contemporary Music Festival at Wigmore Hall. This piece continued Radigue's OCCAM series, exemplified her approach of composing collaboratively and transmitting scores orally, and demonstrated her influence on contemporary music.

== Selected works ==
- Jouet électronique, archival, 1967
- Elemental I, archival, 1968
- Usral, Grand Palais, Paris, 1969
- Omnht, Rive Droite Gallery, Paris, 1970
- Stress Osaka, Osaka International Fair, Osaka, 1970
- Vice-Versa, etc..., Lara Vincy Gallery, Paris, 1970
- Opus 17, Centre Artistique de Verderonne, Verderonne, France, 1970
- Chry-ptus, New York Cultural Art Center, 1971
- 7th Birth, New York, 1972
- Geelriandre, Théatre de la Musique, Paris, 1972
- Ψ 847, The Kitchen, New York, 1973
- Arthesis, Theater Vanguard, Los Angeles, 1973
- Biogenesis and Transamorem Transmortem, The Kitchen, New York, 6 March 1974
- Adnos, Festival d'Automne, Paris, 1974
- 7 petites pièeces pour un Labyrinthe Sonore, GERM, Paris, 1975
- Triptych, Dancehall/Theatre of Nancy, 1978
- Adnos II, Mills College, Oakland, 1980
- Adnos III, Prélude à Milarepa, Experimental Intermedia Foundation, New York, 1982
- 5 Songs of Milarepa, San Francisco Art Institute, 1984
- Jetsun Mila, Vie de Milarepa, GERM, Paris, 1986
- Kyema, New Langton Arts, San Francisco, 1988
- Kailasha, Experimental Intermedia Foundation, New York, 1991
- Koumé, Mamac, Festival MANCA, Nice, 1993

The last three works constitute the three parts of the Trilogie de la Mort.

- L’Île Re-sonante, 2000
- Elemental II, Festival Cités soniques, CCmix, January 2004
- Naldjorlak, Tenri Cultural Institute, New York, December 2005
- Naldjorlak I II III, CACP, Bordeaux, January 2009

=== Occam Series ===
- Occam I for harp. Premiered by Rhodri Davies in London (Sound and Music Festival, June 14, 2011)
- Occam II for violin. Premiered by Silvia Tarozzi in Bologna (Angelica Festival, May 3, 2012)
- Occam III for birbynė. Premiered by Carol Robinson in Bologna (Angelica Festival, May 3, 2012) 20'
- Occam IV for viola. Premiered by Julia Eckhardt in Bologna (Angelica Festival, May 3, 2012)
- Occam V for cello. Premiered by Charles Curtis in New York (Issue Project Room, September 20, 2013)
- Occam VI for EMS synthesizer. Premiered by Thomas Lehn in Berlin (faithful!/Berghain Festival, October 12, 2012)
- Occam VII for voice and electronics. Premiered by Antye Greie -Ripatti (AGF)
- Occam VIII for cello. Premiered by Deborah Walker in Metz (FRAC Lorraine, December 5, 2013)
- Occam IX for "digital spring spyre". Premiered by Laetitia Sonami in San Francisco (Brava Theater SFEMF2013, September 13, 2013)
- Occam X for trumpet. Premiered by Nate Wooley in New York (Issue Project Room, October 24, 2014)
- Occam XI for tuba. Premiered by Robin Hayward in Brussels (Q-O2, December 5, 2014)
- Occam XII for viola. Premiered by Catherine Lamb in Frankfurt (Cresc... Biennale für Moderne Musik, November 25, 2017)
- Occam XIII for bassoon. Premiered by Dafne Vicente-Sandoval in Glasgow (Tectonics Festival, May 2, 2015)
- Occam XIV for harp. Premiered by Hélène Bréchand in Paris (Collège des Bernardins, April 26, 2017)
- Occam XV for clarinet in C. Premiered by Bruno Martinez
- Occam XVI for bass clarinet. Premiered by Carol Robinson in Dundalk (Oriel Centre, June 20, 2014) 23'
- Occam XVII for double bass. Premiered by Dominic Lash in London (South Bank Centre, Harmonic Series, February 3, 2016)
- Occam XVIII for contrabass recorder. Premiered by Pia Palme (Huddersfield, Beyond Pythagoras Symposium, March 21, 2014)
- Occam XIX for five string double bass. Premiered by Louis-Michel Marion in Clermont-Ferrand (Festival des Musiques Démesurées, November 15, 2014) 30'
- Occam XX for EMS synthesizer. Premiered by Ryoko Akama in Huddersfield (Huddersfield Contemporary Music Festival, November 22, 2014)
- Occam XXI for violin. Premiered by Angharad Davies in Mexico (El Nicho festival, May 17, 2015)
- Occam XXII for voice. Premiered by Yannick Guédon in San Sebastian (Tabakalera, June 29, 2018)
- Occam XXIII for alto saxophone. Premiered by Bertrand Gauguet in Paris (Festival d'Automne, Palais de Tokyo, December 14, 2018) 20'
- Occam XXIV for bass and alto flute. Premiered by Cat Hope in Eveleigh New South Wales (Carriageworks, June 28, 2018)
- Occam XXV for organ. Premiered by Frédéric Blondy in London (Organ Reframed Festival, October 13, 2018) 40'
- Occam XXVI for percussion (cymbal). Premiered by Enrico Malatesta in Berlin (Barggain/CTM festival, November 16, 2018)
- Occam XXVII for bagpipes. Premiered by Erwan Keravec in Montreal (Le Gesù, Amphitheatre, September 11, 2019)
- Occam River I for birbynė and viola. Premiered by Carol Robinson, Julia Eckhardt in Bolzano (Muserole Festival, May 5, 2012) 25'
- Occam River II for violin and cello ". Premiered by Silvia Tarozzi, Deborah Walker in Metz (FRAC Lorraine, December 5, 2013)
- Occam River III for birbynė and trumpet. Premiered by Carol Robinson, Nate Wooley in New York (Issue Project Room, October 24, 2014) 22'
- Occam River IV for tuba and cello. Premiered by Robin Hayward, Charles Curtis in Brussels (Q-O2, December 5, 2014)
- Occam River V for viola and cello. Premiered by Catherine Lamb, Deborah Walker in Brussels (Festival Ars Musica, November 14, 2014)
- Occam River VI for contrabass recorder and harp. Premiered by Pia Palme, Rhodri Davies in Huddersfield (Beyond Pythagoras Symposium, March 21, 2014)
- Occam River VII for bassoon and cello. Premiered by Dafne Vicente-Sandoval and Deborah Walker
- Occam River VIII for bass clarinet and five string double bass. Premiered by Carol Robinson, Louis-Michel Marion in Claremont-Ferrand (Festival des Musiques Démesurées, November 15, 2014) 26'
- Occam River IX for two violas. Premiered by Julia Eckhardt, Catherine Lamb in Brussels (Festival Ars Musica, November 14, 2014)
- Occam River X for bassoon and tuba. Premiered by Dafne Vicente-Sandoval, Robin Hayward in Glasgow (Techtonics Festival, May 2, 2015)
- Occam River XI for bassoon and cello. Premiered by Dafne Vicente-Sandova, Charles Curtis in Glasgow (Techtonics Festival, May 2, 2015)
- Occam River XII for cello and harp. Premiered by Charles Curtis, Rhodri Davies in Glasgow (Techtonics Festival, May 2, 2015)
- Occam River XIII for bassoon and harp. Premiered by Dafne Vincente Sandoval and Rhodri Davies in Oslo (Ultima oslo contemporary music festival, September 9, 2017)
- Occam River XIV for harp and five string double bass. Premiered by Hélène Breschand and Louis-Michel Marion (Collège des Bernardins, April 26, 2017)
- Occam River XV for violin and double bass. Premiered by Angharad Davies and Dominic Lash in Matlock Bath, Derbyshire (Great Masson Cavern, September 17, 2017)
- Occam River XVI for birbynė and harp. Premiered by Carol Robinson and Rhodri Davies in Brooklyn (Moving Sounds Festival, October 20, 2017) 54'
- Occam River XVII for violin and harp. Premiered by Angharad Davies and Rhodri Davies
- Occam River XVIII for double bass and harp. Premiered by Dominic Lash and Rhodri Davies
- Occam River XIX for viola and baritone. Premiered by Julia Eckhardt and Yannick Guédon in San Sebastian (Tabakalera, June 29, 2018)
- Occam River XX for harp duo Helene Breschand and Rhodri Davies
- Occam River XXI for tuba and harp Robin Hayward and Rhodri Davies
- Occam River XXII for bass clarinet and saxophone (co-signed with Carol Robinson) Premiered by Carol Robinson and Bertrand Gauguet in Paris (Palais de Tokyo, December 14, 2018) 28'
- Occam River XXIII
- Occam River XXIV
- Occam River XXV
- Occam River XXVI
- Occam River XXVII for bass clarinet and harp Premiered by Carol Robinson and Helene Breschand in Paris (Centre Georges Pompidou, September 13, 2020) 20'
- Occam River XXVIII for birbynė and viola de gamba (2021) 27'
- Occam Delta I for birbynė, violin, viola and harp. Premiered by Carol Robinson, Silvia Tarozzi, Julia Eckhardt, Rhodri Davies in Bologna (Angelica Festival, May 3, 2012)
- Occam Delta II for bass clarinet, viola and harp. Premiered by Carol Robinson, Julia Eckhardt, Rhodri Davies in Huddersfield (Huddersfield Contemporary Music Festival, November 19, 2012) 30'
- Occam Delta III for violin, viola and cello. Premiered by Silvia Tarozzi, Julia Eckhardt, Deborah Walker in Metz (FRAC Lorraine, December 5, 2013)
- Occam Delta IV for tuba, cello and harp. Premiered by Robin Hayward, Charles Curtis, Rhodri Davies in Paris (Festival d'Automne, November 22, 2013)
- Occam Delta V for bass clarinet, tuba, cello and harp. Premiered by Carol Robinson, Robin Hayward, Charles Curtis, Rhodri Davies in Paris (Festival d'Automne, November 22, 2013) 20'
- Occam Delta VI pour bassoon, two violas and cello. Premiered by Dafne Vicente-Sandoval, Julia Eckhardt, Catherine Lamb, Deborah Walker
- Occam Delta VII for two violas and cello. Premiered by Julia Eckhardt, Catherine Lamb, Deborah Walker in Brussels (Festival Ars Musica, November 14, 2014)
- Occam Delta VIII for bassoon, tuba, cello and harp. Premiered by Charles Curtis, Rhodri Davies, Robin Hayward, Dafne Vicente-Sandoval in Glasgow (Techtonics Festival, May 2, 2015)
- Occam Delta IX for bassoon, tuba, and cello. Premiered by Dafne Vicente-Sandoval, Robin Hayward, Charles Curtis in Mexico (Festival El Nicho, May 17, 2015)
- Occam Delta X for trombone, horn, tuba. Premiered by Hillary Jeffrey, Elena Kanakaliagou, Robin Howard in Milan (Pirelli Hangar Bicocca, December 18, 2018)
- Occam Delta XI for violin, viola and bassoon. Premiered by Silvia Tarozzi, Julia Eckhardt, Dafne Vicente-Sandoval in Paris (Cartier Foundation, July 4, 2016)
- Occam Delta XII for bass fute, bass clarinet and cello. Premiered by Erik Drescher, Volker Hemken, Robert Engelbrecht in Hamburg (Club Katarakt, January 20, 2017)
- Occam Delta XIII for bass clarinet, harp and 5-string double bass. Premiered by Carol Robinson, Hélène Breschand, Louis-Michel Marion in Metz (Église Saint-Maximin, Fragment, January 18, 2019) 35'
- Occam Delta XIV for harp, violin and double bass. Premiered by Angharad Davies, Dominic Lash, Rhodri Davies in London (Café Oto, March 10, 2019)
- Occam Delta XV for string quartet. Premiered by Isabelle Bozzini, Alissa Cheung, Stéphanie Bozzini, Clemens Merkel in Montreal (Fonderie Darling, Suoni per il Popolo Festival, June 9, 2018)
- Occam Delta XVI for bassoon, tuba and harp. Premiered by Dafne Vicente-Sandoval, Robin Hayward, Rhodri Davies in Darmstadt (Darmstadt Summer Course, July 17, 2018)
- Occam Delta XVII for bassoon, violoncello and harp. Premiered by Dafne Vicente-Sandoval, Charles Curtis, Rhodri Davies in Glasgow (Festival Techtonics, May 2, 2015)
- Occam Delta XVIII for saxophone, viola, baritone, bass clarinet. Premiered by Bertrand Gauguet, Julia Eckhardt, Yannick Guedon, Carol Robinson in Paris (Palais de Tokyo, December 14, 2018) 30'
- Occam Delta XIX for alto saxophone, birbynė, voice+viola de gamba. Premiered by Carol Robinson, Bertrand Gauguet, Yannick Guedon (2019) 25'
- Occam Hexa I for bass clarinet, tuba, viola, cello and harp. Premiered by Carol Robinson, Robin Hayward, Julia Eckhardt, Charles Curtis, Rhodri Davies in Paris (Festival d'Automne, November 22, 2013) 24'
- Occam Hexa II for flute, clarinet, viola, cello and percussion (co-signed with Carol Robinson). Premiered by Decibel (Cat Hope, Linsay Vickery, Aaron Wyatt, Tristen Parr, Stuart James) in Perth, Australia (PICA, October 30, 2015)
- Occam Hexa III for trumpet, bassoon, bass clarinet, violin, viola and 5-string double bass. Premiered by Nate Wooley, Dafné Vicente-Sandoval, Carol Robinson, Silvia Tarozzi, Julia Eckhardt, Louis-Michel Marion (Foundation Cartier, July 4, 2016) 27'
- Occam Hexa IV for 2 violins, viola, cello and double bass. Premiered by Silvia Tarozzi, Angharad Davies, Julia Eckhardt and Dominic Lash in Huddersfield (Huddersfield Contemporary Music Festival, November 21, 2016)
- Occam Hexa V for 2 saxophones, trombone, electric guitar, piano and percussion
- Occam Hepta I for Ensemble Dedalus (guitar, viola, trombone, trompet, violin, bassoon, and cello). Premiered in Salzburg (University Mozarteum, Festival Crossroads, December 6, 2018)
- Occam Océan I for large ensemble. Premiered by ONCEIM, conductor Fréderic Blondy in Paris (Église Saint Merri, CRACK Festival, September 26, 2015) 55'

== Discography ==
- Vice - Versa, Etc... (single disc) (Self-released, 1970; re-issued Important, 2009)
- Songs of Milarepa (single disc) (Lovely Music, 1983)
- Jetsun Mila (Lovely Music, 1987)
- Mila's Journey Inspired by a Dream (Lovely Music, 1987)
- Kyema, Intermediate States (Experimental Intermedia, 1990)
- Biogenesis (Metamkine, 1996)
- Trilogie de la mort (Experimental Intermedia, 1998)
- Songs of Milarepa (two discs) (Lovely Music, 1998)
- Σ = a = b = a + b (2 x 7" limited edition) (Galerie Yvon Lambert, 1969, taken up by Povertech Industries, 2000)
- Adnos I–III (Table of the Elements, 2002)
- Geelriandre / Arthesis (Fringes Archive, 2003)
- Elemental II (Records of Sleaze Art, 2004)
- L'île re-sonante (Shiiin, 2005)
- Chry-ptus (Schoolmap, 2007)
- Naldjorlak for Charles Curtis, (Shiiin, 2008)
- Triptych (Important, 2009)
- Jouet electronique / Elemental I (Alma Marghen, 2010)
- Transamorem / Transmortem (Important, 2011)
- Feedback Works 1969–1970 (Alga Marghen, 2012)
- "Ψ 847" (Oral, 2013)
- Naldjorlak I II III (Shiiin, 2013)
- Opus 17 (Alga Marghen, 2013)
- Occam Ocean 1 (Shiiin, 2017)
- Occam XXV (Organ Reframed, 2022)

The triple-CD recording Trilogie de la mort includes Kyema, Kailasha and Koume. The two-disc recording Songs of Milarepa includes Mila's Journey Inspired by a Dream .

=== With The Lappetites ===
- Before the Libretto (Quecksilber, 2005)
