= Tape loop =

Loops of magnetic tape to create patterns or sounds

A woman working with a tape loop

In music, tape loops are loops of magnetic tape used to create repetitive, rhythmic musical patterns or dense layers of sound when played on a tape recorder. Originating in the 1940s with the work of Pierre Schaeffer, they were used among contemporary composers of 1950s and 1960s, such as Éliane Radigue, Steve Reich, Terry Riley, and Karlheinz Stockhausen, who used them to create phase patterns, rhythms, textures, and timbres. Popular music authors of 1960s and 1970s, particularly in psychedelic, progressive and ambient genres, used tape loops to accompany their music with innovative sound effects. In the 1980s, analog audio and tape loops with it gave way to digital audio and application of computers to generate and process sound.

== Description ==
In a tape loop, a section of magnetic tape is cut and spliced end-to-end, creating a circle or loop which can be played continuously, usually on a reel-to-reel tape recorder, making the sound repeat endlessly.

Simultaneous playing of tape loops to create patterns and rhythms was developed and initially used by musique concrète and tape music composers, and was most extensively utilized by Steve Reich for his "phasing" pieces such as "Come Out" (1966) and "It's Gonna Rain" (1965), and by Karlheinz Stockhausen in Gesang der Jünglinge (1955–56) and Kontakte (1958–60). Stockhausen also used the technique for live performance in Solo (1965–66).

If, instead of simply playing back a recorded loop, something is done to progressively alter the recorded material between cycles, such as re-recording the sound before it passes the playback head or adding new material to the loop, then a process of change will occur in the content, quality and complexity of the material.

On a standard reel-to-reel tape recorder, one loop can be no more than few seconds long. Some composers were satisfied with this approach, but there were other methods to allow for longer loops. For example, placing two reel-to-reel machines side by side with the tape path running from the one to the other. By using this method, some composers could create very long loops which allowed for sounds of greater duration. When recording his landmark 1978 ambient album Music for Airports, Brian Eno reported that for a particular song, "One of the tape loops was seventy-nine feet long and the other eighty-three feet". The longest open tape loop ever created was made by Barry Anderson for performances of Stockhausen's Solo. Hainbach and Look Mum No Computer created the world’s longest tape loop at 76.62 meters (251 feet) in Ramsgate, UK in 2023. Closed cartridges as used in 8-Track recorders commonly make longer lengths available.

By accelerating the speed of a loop to a sufficient degree (e.g., 1,280 times faster), a sequence of events originally perceived as a rhythm becomes heard as a pitch, and variation of the rhythm in the original succession of events produces different timbres in the accelerated sound. The maximum available acceleration of most three-speed tape recorders is four times.

== History ==
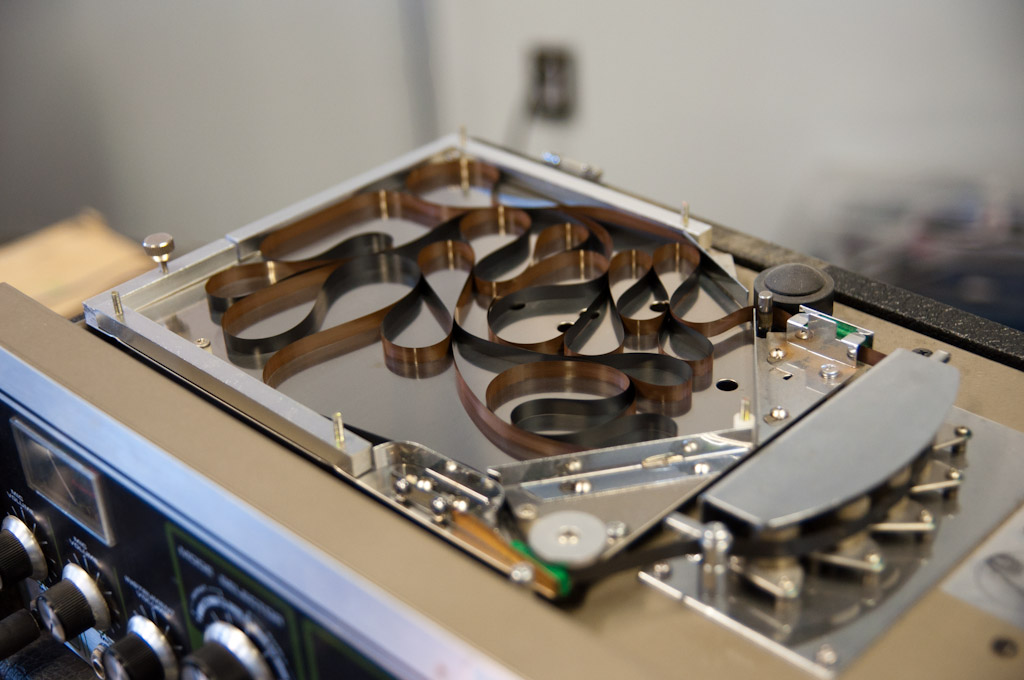
A looped tape, capstans, and multiple magnetic heads for multiple echos on a Roland RE-101 Space Echo unit

In the late 1940s, Pierre Schaeffer used special phonograph discs with a sillon fermé (closed groove) to repeat segments of sounds in his musique concrète studio in Paris. When magnetic tape technology became available, he replaced this technique with tape loops, where such segments could either be simply repeated, or could undergo electronic transformation during repetition.

In 1955, Éliane Radigue, an apprentice of Pierre Schaeffer at Studio d'Essai, learned to cut, splice and edit tape using his techniques. However, in the late 60s she became more interested in tape feedback. She composed several pieces (Jouet Electronique [1967], Elemental I [1968], Stress-Osaka [1969], Usral [1969], Ohmnht [1970] Vice Versa, etc [1970]) by processing the feedback between two tape recorders and a microphone.

Halim El-Dabh, who experimented with tape music from the early 1940s to the 1950s, also utilized tape loops. Beginning in the late 1950s, the BBC Radiophonic Workshop began using tape loops to add special effects to some BBC programming. Several different configurations of tape loops were employed in the early years of the WDR Studio in Cologne. One such arrangement was used to build up multilayered textures by sequentially recording sounds with the erase head disconnected or with a customised arrangement of the heads. Gottfried Michael Koenig applied this method in 1954, in his Klangfiguren I.

In Canada, Hugh Le Caine produced "a particularly clear and memorable example of musique concrète" in 1955 titled Dripsody. It was built from the sound of a single drop of water, using a variable-speed tape recorder, tape loops, and just 25 splices. At this same time in Cologne, Karlheinz Stockhausen produced a more ambitious work, Gesang der Jünglinge (1955–56), which made extensive use of tape loops, particularly for its stratified impulse groups and choral swarms.

Minimalist composer Terry Riley began employing tape loops at the end of the 1950s. Using simple Wollensak tape recorders, he recorded piano music, speech and other sound samples, which he would reproduce on speakers surrounding the audience along with live performance, creating "orchestral textures", as Edward Strickland puts it. With assistance of Richard Maxfield and Ramon Sender, Riley combined tape loops with echoplex devices, producing an "acid trip" piece Mescalin Mix (1961), made from sound samples from his earlier works. Later, he experimented with combining different tapes together, producing pieces such as Music for the Gift (1963) and culminating in his use of a tape delay/feedback system employing two tape recorders (collectively described by Riley as the "time lag accumulator") in live solo performances.

The use of tape loops in popular music dates back to Jamaican dub music in the 1960s. Dub producer King Tubby used tape loops in his productions, while improvising with homemade delay units. Another dub producer, Sylvan Morris, developed a slapback echo effect by using both mechanical and handmade tape loops. These techniques were later adopted by hip-hopians in the 1970s.

Steve Reich also used tape loops to compose, using a technique which he called "phasing". He would put two tape loops together at slightly different speeds, so they would start playing simultaneously and then drift apart. Pieces created by this method are It's Gonna Rain (1965) and Come Out (1966). In Violin Phase (1967) he combined the tape loop with an instrumental score. Later on, Gavin Bryars explored a similar concept in composition 1, 2, 1-2-3-4 (1971), played by a small ensemble in which every musician independently tried to reproduce tape recording.

A ~5 second 9.25" tape loop set in a cassette tape.

In the 1960s and 1970s, use of tape loops made a breakthrough in popular music. As they progressed towards their "psychedelic" phase, the Beatles increasingly experimented with new technology and tape recorders, a process which culminated with Revolver (1966) and its last track "Tomorrow Never Knows", based on five tape loops running simultaneously. "Revolution 9" (1968) was an even more experimental venture, consisting almost entirely of tape loops fading in and out.

Introduction of new technologies, such as analog music sequencers and synthesizers in the 1970s, followed by digital sequencers in 1977, marked an end of the tape loop era in the music industry. With the advent of MIDI in 1983, computers and digital devices took over the production of sound effects from analog devices. Tape loop compositions have seen only sporadic revivals since, such as William Basinski's The Disintegration Loops series (2002–2003), evidencing the slow death of his tapes originally recorded in the 1980s.

== Recordings ==
- Sounds of New Music. LP recording 1 disc: 33⅓ rpm, monaural, 12 in. (New York City: Folkways Records, 1957, FX 6160). Reissued on CD, as Sounds of New Music: Science Series. CD recording, 1 disc: digital, monaural, 4 3/4 in. (Washington, DC: Smithsonian Folkways Recordings, 1990s, FX 6160).
- Karlheinz Stockhausen: Solo, für Melodie-Instrument mit Rückkopplung; Vinko Globokar: Discours II pour cinq trombones; Luciano Berio: Sequenza V; Carlos Roqué Alsina: Consecuenza. Vinko Globokar (trombone). Avant Garde. LP recording. Deutsche Grammophon 137 005. [Hamburg]: Deutsche Grammophon Gesellschaft 1969.
- Jean Jacques Perrey & Gershon Kingsley: The In Sound From Way Out (Vanguard Records, 1966, VSD 79222), Kaledoscopic Vibrations (Vanguard Records, 1967, VSD 79264), Moog Indigo (Vanguard Records, 1970, VSD 6549).
- Knut Sønstevold, bassoon. Knut Sønstevold; Miklós Maros; Carel Brons; Arne Mellnäs; Lars-Gunnar Bodin; Karlheinz Stockhausen; Sten Hanson. [Solo recorded at Danviken Hospital Church, 23–26 June 1977]. LP recording Fylkingen Records FYLP 1011. [Stockholm]: Fylkingen Records, 1977.
- Stockhausen, Karlheinz: Solo (Version für Flöte); Solo (Version für Synthesizer); Spiral (Version für Oboe). Dietmar Wiesner (flute), Simon Stockhausen (synthesizer) Catherine Milliken (oboe). CD recording. Stockhausen Complete Edition CD 45. Kürten: Stockhausen-Verlag, 1995.
- Sönstevold Plays Stockhausen. Karlheinz Stockhausen: Solo, In Freundschaft, Spiral, Tierkreis. Knut Sønstevold (bassoon); Kina Sønstevold (piano). Nosag CD 042; [Solo recorded by Swedish Radio on 4 October 1985 during the EAM Festival, Berwaldhallen]. [Sweden]: Nosag Records, 2000.

== See also ==
- Endless tape cartridge (closed loop tape system)
- Dubbing (music)
- Overdubbing
- Recording studio as an instrument

=== Footnotes ===
Sources

- Nick Collins; "Live Electronic Music". In The Cambridge Companion to Electronic Music, edited by Nick Collins and Julio d'Escrivan, 38–54. Cambridge and New York: Cambridge University Press, 2007. ISBN 978-0-521-86861-7 (cloth); ISBN 978-0-521-68865-9 (pbk); ISBN 978-1-107-49532-6.
- Pascal Decroupet and Elena Ungeheuer; "Through the Sensory Looking-Glass: The Aesthetic and Serial Foundations of Gesang der Jünglinge", translated by Jerome Kohl. Perspectives of New Music 36, no. 1 (Winter 1998), 97–142.
- Sasha Frere-Jones; "Looped In"; The New Yorker, November 10, 2014
- Holmes, Thom (2008). "Early Synthesizers and Experimenters". Electronic and Experimental Music: Technology, Music, and Culture (3rd ed.). Taylor & Francis. ISBN 978-0-415-95781-6.
- Brian Kane; Unseen: Acousmatic Sound in Theory and Practice. Oxford and New York: Oxford University Press, 2014; ISBN 978-0-19-934785-8.
- Robin Maconie; Other Planets: The Music of Karlheinz Stockhausen. Lanham, Maryland, Toronto, Oxford: The Scarecrow Press, Inc., 2005; ISBN 0-8108-5356-6.
- Robin Maconie; Avant Garde: An American Odyssey from Gertrude Stein to Pierre Boulez. Lanham, Maryland, Toronto, Oxford: The Scarecrow Press, 2012; ISBN 978-0-8108-8312-3.
- Steve Marshall. "The Story Of The BBC Radiophonic Workshop". Sound on Sound, April 2008
- André Millard; Beatlemania: Technology, Business, and Teen Culture in Cold War America. Johns Hopkins University Press, 2012; ISBN 978-1-4214-0524-7
- Marietta Morawska-Büngeler; Schwingende Elektronen. Eine Dokumentation über das Studio für Elektronische Musik des Westdeutschen Rundfunks in Köln 1951–1986. Cologne-Rodenkirchen: P. J. Tonger, 1988. ISBN 3-920950-06-2.
- Keith Potter; Four Musical Minimalists: La Monte Young, Terry Riley, Steve Reich, Philip Glass, 98–100. Cambridge University Press, 2002; ISBN 978-0-521-01501-1.
- Keith Potter, Kyle Gann and Pwyll ap Siôn. The Ashgate Research Companion to Minimalist and Postminimalist Music; Ashgate Publishing, 2013; ISBN 978-1-4724-0278-3
- Mark Prendergrast; The Ambient Century: From Mahler to Trance, the Evolution of Sound in the Electronic Age; New York: Bloomsbury, 2000; ISBN 1-58234-134-6.
- Rodgers, Tara (2010). Pink Noises: Women on Electronic Music and Sound. Duke University Press. doi:10.1215/9780822394150. ISBN 978-0-8223-9415-0.
- Karlheinz Stockhausen; "The Concept of Unity in Electronic Music", translated by Elaine Barkin. Perspectives of New Music 1, no. 1 (Fall 1962), 39–48.
- Karlheinz Stockhausen; "Vier Kriterien der Elektronischen Musik". In his Texte zur Musik 1970–1977, vol. 4, edited by Christoph von Blumröder, 360–401. DuMont Dokumente. Cologne: DuMont Buchverlag, 1978. ISBN 3-7701-1078-1.
- Paul Théberge; "Sequencer (Sequencer Software)". In Continuum Encyclopedia of Popular Music of the World: Part 1 – Performance and Production edited by John Shepherd, David Horn, Dave Laing, Paul Oliver, Peter Wicke; A&C Black, 2003. ISBN 978-1-84714-472-0
- Lloyd Ultan; "Electronic Music". In Encyclopedia of Computer Science and Technology: Volume 34, Supplement 19: Artificial Intelligence in Education to An Undergraduate Course? Advising Expert System in Industrial Engineering, edited by Allen Kent and James G. Williams; administrative editors, Carolyn M. Hall and Rosalind Kent; executive editor, Jack Belzer, 149–178. New York: Marcel Dekker, 1996. ISBN 978-0-8247-2287-6.
- Veal, Michael E. Dub: Songscapes and Shattered Songs in Jamaican Reggae. Middletown: Wesleyan University Press, 2007. ISBN 978-0-8195-7442-8
