= Mireille Chamass-Kyrou =

French musique concrète composer

- Born: September 1931; Cairo
- Died: 2017 (aged 85–86)
- Spouse(s): Adonis A. Kyrou
- Children: Axel Kyrou, Ariel Kyrou

Mireille Chamass-Kyrou (September 1931 – 2017) was a French musique concrète composer.

Mireille Chamass was born in September 1931 in Cairo to a French mother and Palestinian father. She studied piano with Brigitte Schiffer at the State Institute for the Education of Women in Fine Arts in Cairo. In 1955, she moved to Paris and studied under Oliver Messiaen.

In 1958, she joined the Groupe de Recherche Musicale, founded by Pierre Schaeffer. She worked with the GRM for four years, contributing to system of musical notation for musique concrète that was eventually published by Schaeffer. She left GRM in 1961 to raise her children.

Her Etude 1 (1960), which employed instruments including a comb and a feather, was included on the album Musique Concrète (Philips, 1964) and other compilations of GRM music. She also composed the soundtrack to Adonis Kyrou's short film La Chevelure (1960), based on the short story by Guy de Maupassant. Her Film Musique, written in the 60s for an unknown project, was released in 2019 on the album Experimental Lineage.

== Personal life ==
She married Greek surrealist filmmaker Adonis Kyrou. They had two sons, journalist Ariel Kyrou and Axel Kyrou, musician and founding member of the band Vox Populi!.
