= Acousmatic sound =

Sound that is heard without an originating cause being seen

Acousmatic sound is sound that is heard without an originating cause being seen. The word acousmatic, from the French acousmatique, is derived from the Greek word akousmatikoi (ἀκουσματικοί), which referred to probationary pupils of the philosopher Pythagoras who were required to sit in absolute silence while they listened to him deliver his lecture from behind a veil or screen to make them better concentrate on his teachings. The term acousmatique was first used by the French composer and pioneer of musique concrète Pierre Schaeffer. In acousmatic art one hears sound from behind a "veil" of loudspeakers, the source cause remaining unseen. More generally, any sound, whether it is natural or manipulated, may be described as acousmatic if the cause of the sound remains unseen. The term has also been used by the French writer and composer Michel Chion in reference to the use of off-screen sound in film. More recently, in the article Space-form and the acousmatic image (2007), composer and academic Denis Smalley has expanded on some of Schaeffer's acousmatic concepts. Since the 2000s, the term acousmatic has been used, notably in North America to refer to fixed media composition and pieces.

== Origins ==
In 1955, Jérôme Peignot and Pierre Schaeffer were the first to use the term acousmatic to define the listening experience of musique concrète. In his 1966 publication Traité des objets musicaux Schaeffer defined the acousmatic as: Acousmatic, adjective: referring to a sound that one hears without seeing the causes behind it (Schaeffer 1966: 91). Schaeffer held that the acousmatic listening experience was one that reduced sounds to the field of hearing alone. The concept of reduction (epoché), as used in the Husserlian phenomenological tradition, underpinned Schaeffer's conceptualization of the acousmatic experience. In this sense, a subject moves their attention away from the physical object responsible for auditory perception and toward the content of this perception. The purpose of this activity is to become aware of what it is in the field of perception that can be thought of as a certainty. This reductive procedure redirects awareness to hearing alone. Schaeffer remarked that: Often surprised, often uncertain, we discover that much of what we thought we were hearing, was in reality only seen, and explained, by the context (Schaeffer 1966: 93).

Schaeffer derived the word acousmatique from akousmatikoi (hearers), a term used in the time of Pythagoras to refer to his uninitiated students. According to historical records followers of Pythagoras underwent a three-year probationary period, directly followed by a five-year period of "silence", before being admitted to Pythagoras' inner circle as mathêmatikoi (learned). The use of silence related to the protocols of rituals connected with the mystery-like instruction and religious ceremonies of the Pythagorean order. These ceremonies took place behind a veil or curtain with only those who had passed the five-year test being allowed to see their teacher face to face; the remaining students partaking acousmatically. More recent research suggests that the Pythagorean "veil" itself was a euphemism for the figurative language with which Pythagoras taught, and the actual practice of speaking occluded by either a veil or the dark likely never occurred.

== Film sound ==
According to the French film sound theorist Michel Chion (1994), in cinema, the acousmatic situation can arise in two different ways: the source of a sound is seen first and is then "acousmatized", or the sound is initially acousmatic with the source being revealed subsequently. The first scenario allows association of a sound with a specific image from the outset, Chion calls this visualised sound (what Schaeffer referred to as direct sound). In this case it becomes an "embodied" sound, "identified with an image, demythologized, classified". In the second instance the sound source remains veiled for some time, to heighten tension, and is only later revealed, a dramatic feature that is commonly used in mystery and suspense based cinema; this has the effect of "de-acousmatizing" the initially hidden source of the sound (Chion 1994, 72). Chion states that "the opposition between visualised and acousmatic provides a basis for the fundamental audiovisual notion of offscreen space" (Chion 1994, 73).

== See also ==
- Diegesis
- Schizophonia
