= Kasper T. Toeplitz =

French composer and musician

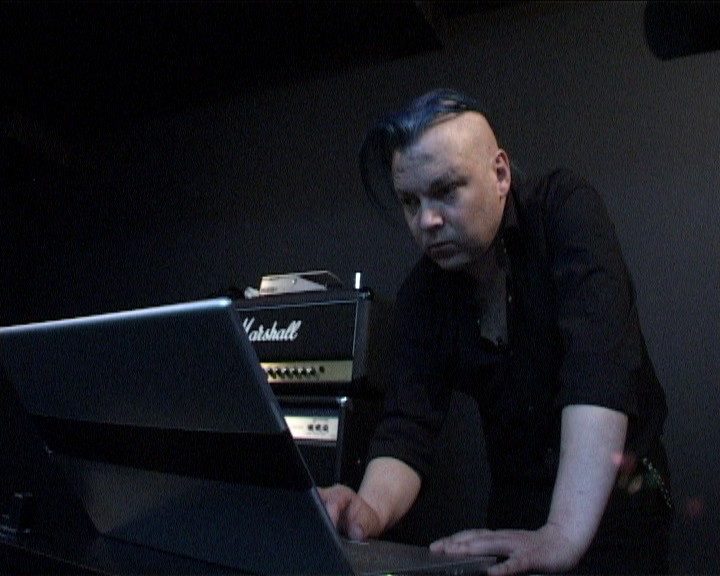

Kasper T. Toeplitz is a French composer and musician of Polish origin, born in 1960. He lives in Paris.

== Biography ==
He has worked with academic research organizations, such as GMEM, GRM, IRCAM, and Radio-France, as well as with experimental musicians, such as Éliane Radigue, Zbigniew Karkowski, Dror Feiler, Tetsuo Furudate, Phill Niblock and Art Zoyd . Citing Giacinto Scelsi and Iannis Xenakis as influences, his early work was mostly written for traditional instruments. He received several prizes and distinctions for these works: 1st prize in composition for orchestra at the festival of Besançon, 1st prize in the Opéra Autrement/Acanthes competition, Villa Médicis Hors-les-Murs in New York, prize Léonard de Vinci in San Francisco, Villa Kujoyama in Kyoto, and DAAD in Berlin. He has also written for his electric guitar orchestra, Sleaze Art. He then integrated computers into his work, via the programming language MAX.

His experimentation with computers continued, in 2003, with the creation of an instrument he calls the BassComputer, an electric bass with 5 fretted strings and 4 unfretted strings, as in the harp guitar. The instrument is intended to be interfaced with a computer. In 2004, he commissioned a piece from Eliane Radigue called Elemental II, which he interpreted for the BassComputer. This was an opportunity for him to set up his own label, ROSA (Recordings Of Sleaze Art). He later commissioned Phil Niblock’s Yam almost may (Touch Records TO59), and Dror Feiler’s Ousia. He also recorded Capture, one of his own compositions, on ROSA (Rosa#2, 2005), as well as ZKT, by Le Dépeupleur, a laptop duet, formed with Zbigniew Karkowski, and which has been together since 1999 (Rosa#3, 2006).

He has also written for dance (Myriam Gourfink, Loic Touzé, Olivia Granville, Emmanuelle Huynh, Hervé Robbe, Artefact, Christian Trouillas, Jean-Marc Matos), as well as theatre; he has always shown a great interest in literature (J'irai vers le nord, j'irai dans la nuit polaire, his first opera, was based on Sylvia Plath's texts, as was Great Expectations on Kathy Acker's texts; Ruine was composed on a François Bon text), and more recently he has developed "combined" pieces, mixing light and/or video images (K_apture, for computer solo, on Dominik Barbier's videos).

In 2007 he created, with Eryck Abecassis and Wilfried Wendling, KERNEL, a computer ensemble devoted to interpretation, live stricto sensu (without any samples or sequences), of electronic music compositions.

== Works ==
- Nature Morte : for orchestra, 1988.
- Zéline : for violoncello solo, 1989.
- Paysage foudroyé : for electric bass solo, 1989.
- J'irai vers le nord, j'irai dans la nuit polaire : opera based on Sylvia Plath's texts, (1st prize in the «Opéra Autrement» competition, Centre Acanthes), 1989.
- Lhow : for orchestra (1st prize in composition for orchestra at the festival of Besançon), 1990.
- Anachorète : for soprano saxophone solo, 1991.
- Memory-Cendres : for a woman's voice, percussions, clarinet and double bass, 1992.
- Sthill : for 8 saxophones, 1992.
- Blind Sucht :for 9 instruments and electroacoustic dispositive, 1993.
- Ephémérides : for 9 instruments, 1995.
- Siyahi : for orchestra, 1996.
- Stances d'orchestre : for orchestra, 1997.
- Je est une autre : for voice, violoncello, clarinet, double bass and percussions, 1997.
- Ruine :for orchestra and soprano solo, on a François Bon text, 1998.
- Biel : for orchestra and samplers, 2000.
- Appars/Vague de pas : for small orchestra, electronic keyboard and percussions, 2001.
- Battling Siki : opera for strings, electronics instruments, theremin, percussions and computers, 2003.
- Froz#5 : for tubax and computer, 2003.
- Contraindre, for theremin (Laurent Dailleau), chor. Myriam Gourfink, 2004.
- Capture : for three dancers/musicians via moving capture by video, 2005 (CD: Rosa #2).
- Unfinished Metal Waves : for big tam (Didier Casamitjana, Jérôme Mimetic Soudan) and computer, 2006.
- This is my House : for saxophone (Ulrich Krieger) and computer, chor. Myriam Gourfink, 2006.
- Champ des Larmes : spectacle with Art Zoyd (written with Gérard Hourbette), 2006.
- Lärmesmitte : for BassComputer, 2006.
- Dust Reconstructions : piece for a nonfixed instrumentarium; in its first execution, for hurdy-gurdy (Stevie Wishart), saxophone (Ulrich Krieger), BassComputer (himself) and computers (all of them), 2007.
- Kernel#2 : KERNEL's first creation, 2007.
- The Deep : for and by KERNEL, 2008.
- Perdu : Mystery Bass - Solo Electric Bass | Published by: Radical Matters - Editions / Label. 2012.

== See also ==
- Thierry Zaboitzeff
