= Elżbieta Sikora =

Polish composer

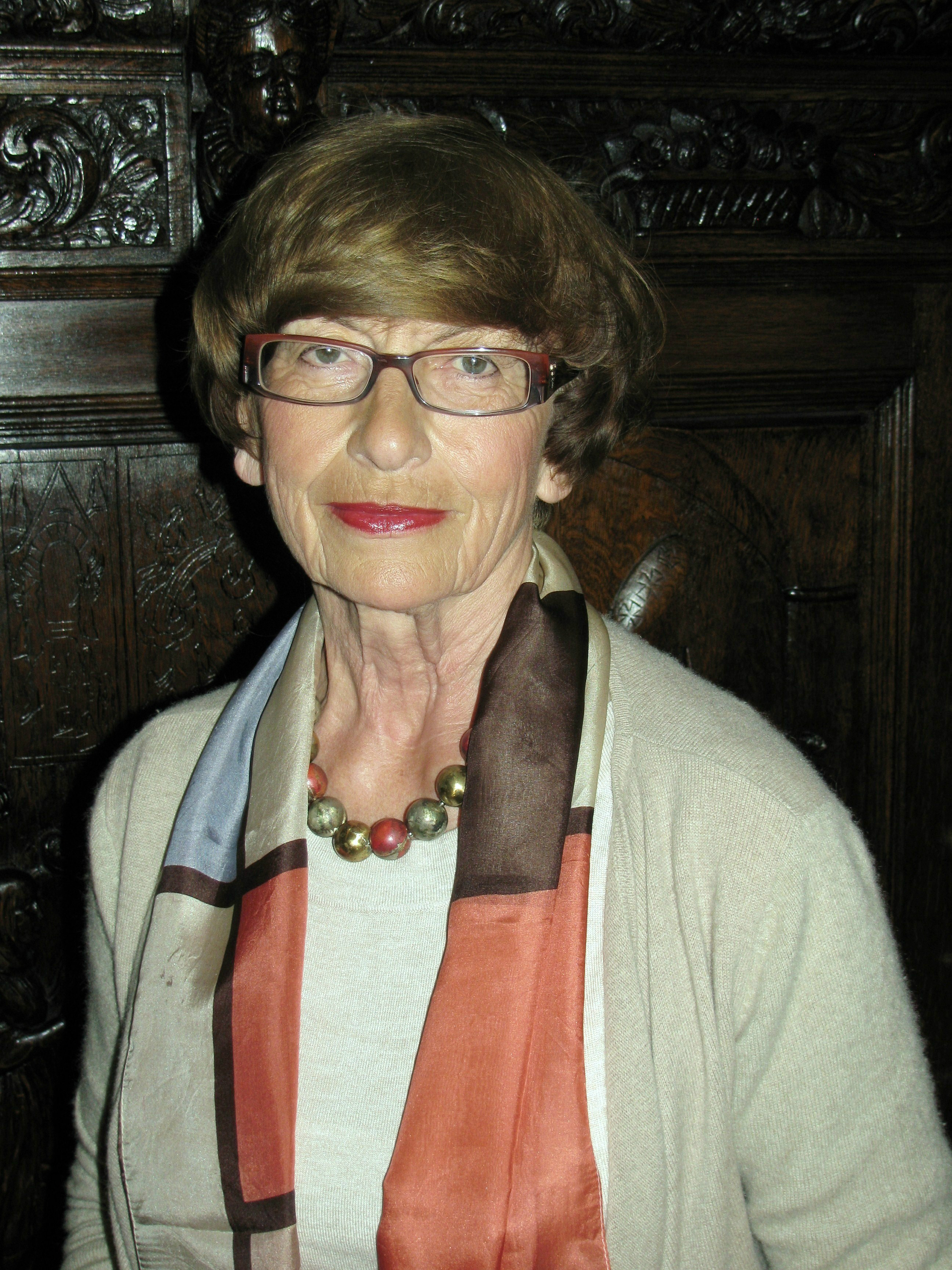
- Born: 20 October 1943 (age 83); Lwów, Second Polish Republic (now Ukraine)
- Era: Contemporary; 20th Century Classical

Elżbieta Sikora (born 20 October 1943 in Lwów, other sources write 1944 or 1945) is a Polish composer who has been resident in France since 1981. She has composed stage, orchestral, chamber, choral, vocal, and electroacoustic works as well as film scores.

Sikora studied under Pierre Schaeffer, François Bayle, Tadeusz Baird, Zbigniew Rudzinski.

She received numerous honors including First Prize in the GEDOK competition in Mannheim (1981, for Guernica, hommage à Pablo Picasso), the Prix de la Partition Pédagogique and the Prix Stéphane Chapelier-Clergue-Gabriel-Marie, both from SACEM (both 1994) and the SACD Prix Nouveau Talent Musique (1996).

Her operas are Ariadna (1977), Derrière son Double (1983), L'arrache-coeur (1992) Madame Curie (2011) and Dorian Gray (2025). Her ballets are Blow-up (1980), Waste Land (1983), La Clef De Verre (1986).
