= Cinq études de bruits =

Five music compositions by Pierre Schaeffer

Cinq études de bruits (Five Studies of Noises) is a series of five musical compositions by Pierre Schaeffer. The five études were composed in 1948 and are the earliest pieces of musique concrète, a form of electroacoustic music first theorized by Schaeffer that utilizes recorded sounds as the primary compositional resource.

The five études were composed at the studio Schaeffer established at RTF (now ORTF), the Studio d'Essai in Paris. They are:

1. Étude aux chemins de fer – trains
2. Étude aux tourniquets – toy tops and percussion instruments
3. Étude violette – piano sounds recorded for Schaeffer by Pierre Boulez
4. Étude noire – piano sounds recorded for Schaeffer by Boulez
5. Étude pathétique – sauce pans, canal boats, singing, speech, harmonica, piano

The works were premiered via a broadcast on 5 October 1948, titled Concert de bruits.

In 2011, The New York Times included Étude aux chemins de fer in its history of the mashup, describing it as "[t]he first piece of musique concrète, composed from recordings of trains." Stony Brook University music professor Margaret Schedel, who writes that Schaeffer is widely regarded as the first composer to "create music with pre-recorded media", describes Étude aux chemins de fer as a sound collage with "a prominent place in most histories of electronic and computer music".
