= Bernard Parmegiani =

French composer

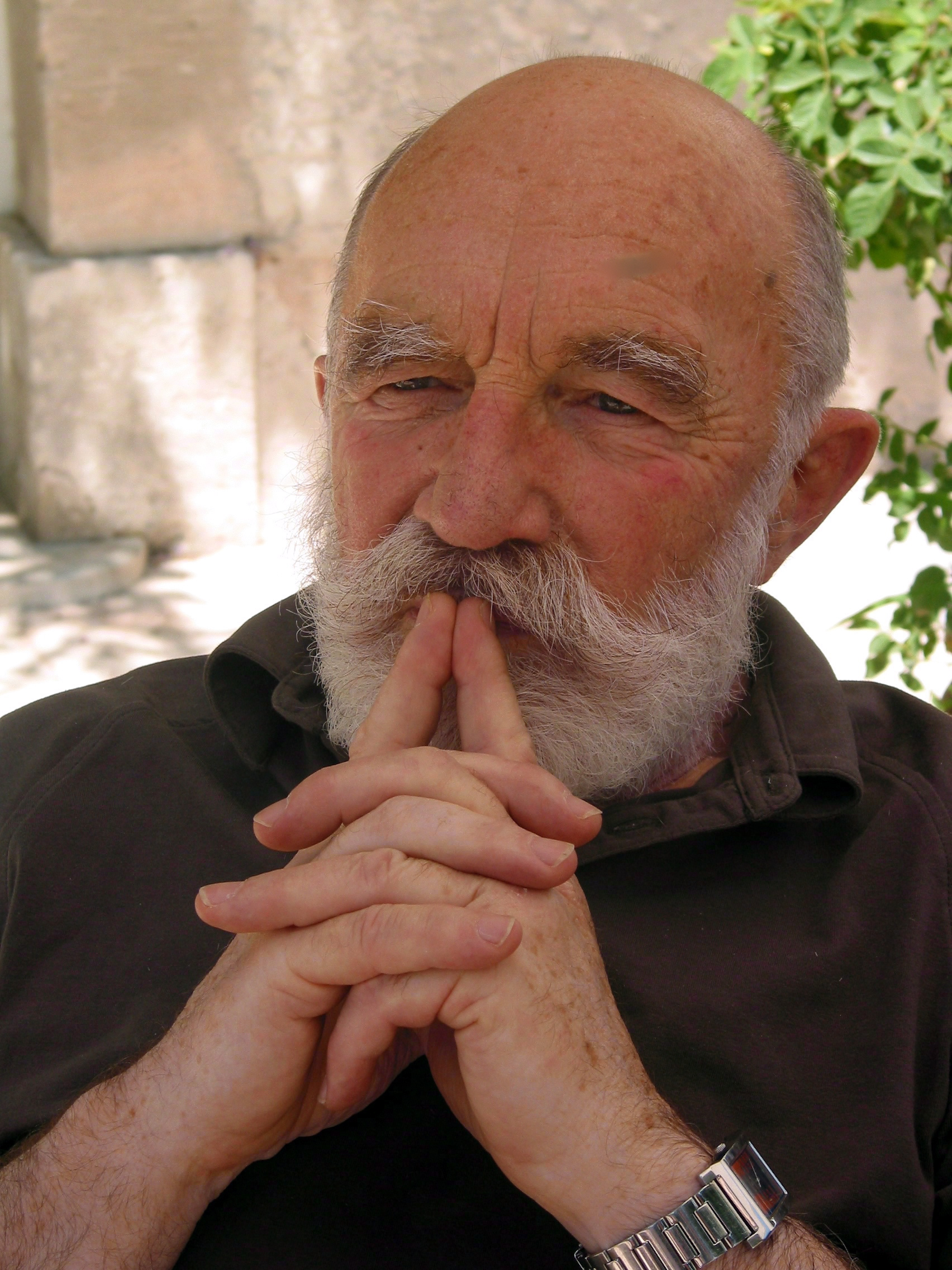
- Parmegiani in 2004
- Born: 27 October 1927; Paris, France
- Died: 21 November 2013 (aged 86); Paris, France
- Occupation: Composer
- Years active: 1964–2013

Bernard Parmegiani (27 October 1927 − 21 November 2013) was a French composer best known for his electronic or acousmatic music.

== Biography ==
Between 1957 and 1961 he studied mime with Jacques Lecoq, a period he later regarded as important to his work as a composer. He joined the Groupe de Recherches Musicales (GRM) in 1959 for a two-year master class, shortly after its founding by Pierre Schaeffer. After leaving his studies with Lecoq, he was first a sound engineer and was later put in charge of the Music/Image unit for French television (ORTF). There he worked in the studio with several notable composers, Iannis Xenakis, for example.

While at ORTF Parmegiani produced music for numerous film directors including Jacques Baratier and Peter Kassovitz, and for A, a 1965 short film animated by Jan Lenica. He also wrote a number of jingles for the French media and the "Indicatif Roissy" that preceded every PA announcement at Terminal 1 of Charles de Gaulle Airport in Paris until 2005.

Parmegiani composed his first major work, Violostries, for violin and tape in 1964 for a choreography performed for Théâtre Contemporain d'Amiens directed by Jacques-Albert Cartier. During a visit to America in the late 1960s, Parmegiani researched the link between music and video and on his return produced several musical videos, including L'Œil écoute, and L'Écran transparent (1973) during a residency at Westdeutscher Rundfunk in Germany. In the 1970s, he also became involved with live performances of jazz and performed with the Third Ear Band in London.

At this time Parmegiani also started writing acousmatic pieces for performance in the concert hall: examples are Capture éphémère of 1967 which deals with the passage of time, and L'Enfer (1972), a collaboration with the composer François Bayle, based on Dante's Divine Comedy.

Parmegiani composed the music for Walerian Borowczyk's films Jeux des Anges (1964) and Docteur Jekyll et les femmes (1981), the soundtrack for the latter comprising cues Parmegiani re-arranged from his 1972 work Pour en finir avec le pouvoir d'Orphée.

In 1992 Parmegiani left the GRM and set up his own studio in Saint-Rémy-de-Provence. In April 2010 he sat on the jury at the sixth Qwartz Electronic Music Awards, a promotional project and support group for electronic music artists.

Parmegiani has been cited as a major influence by younger experimentalists like Aphex Twin, Autechre and Sonic Youth. Works of his were performed at the All Tomorrow's Parties festivals in 2003 and 2008.

== Awards ==
His music has won awards, among them prizes from the Académie du Disque Français in 1979, SACEM in 1981, Les Victoires de la Musique in 1990, and the Prix Magister at the Concours International de Bourges in 1991. In 1993 he was awarded the Golden Nica Award at Prix Ars Electronica for Entre-temps composed the previous year.

== List of compositions ==
- 1964 Violostries
- 1965 La Brûlure De Mille Soleils
- 1967–1968 L'Instant mobile, Capture éphémère
- 1968 : "Pop eclectic" pour le film de Peter Foldes "Je, tu elles"
- 1970 L'Œil écoute
- 1971 La roue ferris
- 1971 L'Enfer (based on La Divine Comédie)
- 1972 Chronos
- 1972 Pour en finir avec le pouvoir d'Orphée
- 1974 Chants Magnétiques
- 1975 De Natura Sonorum
- 1976 Rock
- 1977 Dedans-Dehors
- 1980 L'Echo du miroir
- 1985–1986 Exercismes 1 – 2 – 3
- 1986 La Création du monde
- 1991 Le Présent composé
- 1992 Entre-temps
- 1996 Sonare
- 2002 La mémoire des sons
- 2004 Espèces d'espace
