= François Bayle =

French composer

François Bayle (born 27 April 1932 in Toamasina, Madagascar) is a composer of Electronic Music, Musique concrète. He coined the term Acousmatic Music.

== Career ==
In the 1950s he studied with Olivier Messiaen, Pierre Schaeffer and Karlheinz Stockhausen. In 1960 he joined the Office de Radiodiffusion Télévision Française, and in 1966 was put in charge of the Groupe de Recherches Musicales (GRM). In 1975, the GRM was integrated with the new Institut national de l'audiovisuel (INA) with Bayle as its head, which post he held until 1997. During these years he organized concerts, radio broadcasts, seminars and events celebrating individual composers, supported technological developments (Syter, GRM Tools, Midi Formers, Acousmographe) and was behind innovations such as the Acousmonium and the INA-GRM recordings label.

In 1991, he founded his own electronic music studio, the Studio Magison, where he has devoted himself to research, writing and composition.

In the world of electronic art music, Bayle is regarded as one of the most distinguished composers; his influence is widespread (particularly in France, Europe and French-speaking Canada) and his music has earned some of the most prestigious musical prizes (SACEM Grand Prize for Composers, 1978; National Record Grand Prize, 1981; Ars Electronica Prize, Linz, 1989; City of Paris Grand Prize for Music, 1996; Homage by the CIME of São Paulo, 1997; Charles Cros Presidential Grand Prize, 1999). Doctor honoris causa/Université de Cologne, 2006; Grand Prix de la Fondation Del Duca/Académie de France, 2007; Qwartz Pierre Schaeffer, 2010; Prix Arthur Honegger, 2011, CIME Member of Honor, 2018. In 2012, InaGrm edition 15Cd Box entirely of his music have been released, an exceptionally large number for one composer in the annals of electronic art music. In 2012, François Bayle took part in the French documentary Musique(s) électronique(s) directed by Jérémie Carboni.

== Works ==
Among Bayle's compositions are:

- 1960 Points critiques (instrumental)
- 1962 Trois portraits d'un Oiseau-Qui-N'existe-Pas
- 1962 L'objet captif (instrumental)
- 1963 L'Archipel (quatuor à cordes)
- 1963 Pluriel, pour 19 instruments et haut-parleurs (in Concert Collectif du Grm)
- 1966 Lignes et points
- 1967 Espaces inhabitables
- 1969 Jeïta ou Murmure des eaux
- 1971 Trois Rêves d'oiseau
- 1969–72 L'Expérience Acoustique, suite comprenant:
  - 1. L'Aventure du Cri
  - 2. Le langage des fleurs
  - 3. La preuve par le sens
  - 4. L'épreuve par le son
  - 5. La philosophie du non
- 1972 Purgatoire, d'après La Divine Comédie, de Dante
- 1973 Vibrations composées
- 1974 Grande polyphonie
- 1976 Camera oscura
- 1978 Tremblement de terre très doux
- 1979–80 Erosphère, suite comprenant:
  - 1. La fin du bruit
  - 2. Tremblement de terre très doux
  - 3. Toupie dans le ciel
- 1982 Les Couleurs de la nuit
- 1980–83 Son Vitesse-Lumière, suite comprenant:
  - 1. Grandeur nature
  - 2. Paysage, personnage, nuage
  - 3. Voyage au centre de la tête
  - 4. Le sommeil d'Euclide
  - 5. Lumière ralentie
- 1984 Aéroformes
- 1985 Motion-Emotion
- 1987–88 Théâtre d'Ombres, suite comprenant:
  - 1. ...derrière l'image
  - 2. ...ombres blanches
- 1989 Mimaméta
- 1991 Fabulae, suite comprenant:
  - 1. Fabula
  - 2. Onoma
  - 3. Nota
  - 4. Sonora
- 1994–95 La main vide, suite comprenant:
  - 1. Bâton de pluie
  - 2. La fleur future
  - 3. Inventions
- 1996 Morceaux de ciels
- 1999 Jeîta-retour
- 1999 Arc (pour Gérard Grisey)
- 2000–01 La forme du temps est un cercle, suite comprenant:
  - 1. Concrescence
  - 2. Si loin, si proche
  - 3. Tempi
  - 4. Allures
  - 5. Cercles
- 2002–04 La forme de l'esprit est un papillon, suite comprenant:
  - 1. Ombrages et trouées
  - 2. Couleurs inventées
- 2005 Univers nerveux
- 2008–09 L'Oreille étonnée
- 2010–11 Rien n'est réel, suite comprenant:
  - 1. ...sensations
  - 2. ...perceptions
- 2011–12 Déplacements', suite comprenant:
  - 1. horizontal/vertical
  - 2. spiral
  - 3. diagonal
- 2013–14 Opus 100, suite comprenant:
  - 1. Deviner-Devenir... souffle
  - 2. Deviner-devenir... oiseau
- 2015-15 Figures sans origines
- 2016–17 Le Projet "Ouïr", suite comprenant:
  - 1. ...Qui?
  - 3. ...Sans...
  - 5. ...Où?

== Discography ==
Cycle Bayle (Magison) en 18 CD monographiques

- vol. 1 : Érosphère (Tremblement de terre très doux [28'13"]; Toupie dans le ciel [25'10"]), INA C 3002, ADDA, 1990
- vol. 2 : Théâtre d'ombre [39'24"]; Mimaméta [11'02"], MGCB 0291, ADDA, 1991
- vol. 3 : Vibrations Composées [35'58"]; Grande Polyphonie [36'32"], MGCB 0392, ADDA, 1992
- vol. 4 : Fabulæ [56'45"], Musidisc 244732, 1993
- vol. 5/6 : l'Expérience acoustique [54'15"] + [66'16"], Musidisc 245042, 1994
- vol. 7 : Divine comédie (Enfer, de Bernard Parmegiani [61'20"]; Purgatoire & Paradis terrestre de François Bayle [71'28"]), Musidisc 245372, 1995
- vol. 8 : la Main vide [42'41"], Musidisc 245542, 1996
- vol. 9/10 : Son Vitesse-Lumière [56'08] + [63'15"], Musidisc 247392, 1997
- vol. 11 : Motion-Émotion [22'01"], Musidisc 292432, 1998
- vol. 12 : Morceaux de Ciels [25'27"]; Théâtre d'Ombres [39'24"], Musidisc 248022, 1998
- vol. 13 : Jeîta (Jeîta ou murmure des eaux [39'50"]; l'Infini du bruit [10'55"]; Jeîta-retour [5'23"]), Musidisc 248122, 1999
- vol. 14 : Camera oscura [38'39"]; Espaces inhabitables [17'41"], M10 275112, 2000
- vol. 15 : La forme du temps est un cercle [59'30"], M10 275862, 2001
- vol. 16 : Toupie dans le ciel (version originale « sans remix ») [21'00"], MGCB e102, 2002
- vol. 17 : Tremblement de terre très doux (non paru)
- vol. 18 : La forme de l'esprit est un papillon [35'35"] (suivi de Trois rêves d'oiseau [10'00"] et Mimaméta [10'46"]), M10 275972, 2004
- Coffret Bayle (InaGrm) en 15 CD
- CD 1 / 1963–71 / 67’ 25 // Trois Rêves d’oiseau 9’48 // Espaces inhabitables 18’02 // Jeîta, ou Murmures des eaux 39’21 (version 2012 inédite)
- CD 2 / 1969–71 / 54’19 // L’Expérience Acoustique : I / L’Aventure du cri 17’34II // II / Le Language des fleurs 34’37
- CD 3 / 1971–72 / 65’55 // L’Expérience Acoustique : III / La Preuve par le sens 32’13 // IV / L’Epreuve par le son 24’43 // V / La Philosophie du non 8’57
- CD 4 / 1972 / 71’38 // Divine Comédie : Purgatoire & Paradis terrestre 71’38
- CD 5 / 1973–74 / 72’32 // Vibrations composées 36’02 // Grande polyphonie 36’32
- CD 6 / 1976–82 / 57’57 // Camera oscura 28’00 : Sept préludes : 19’56 & Labyrinthe (version 2012 inédite) 8’04 // Les Couleurs de la nuit 29’52 (version 2012 inédite)
- CD 7 / 1978–80 / 68’33 // Erosphère : Tremblement de terre très doux 28’19 // La fin du bruit 16’35 (version 2009 inédite) // Toupie dans le ciel 23’40 (version 2009 inédite)
- CD 8 / 1980–81 / 56’02 // Son Vitesse-Lumière : I / Grandeur nature 32’01 // II / Paysage, personage, nuage 24’01
- CD 9 / 1981–83 / 63’15 // Son Vitesse-Lumière : III / Voyage au centre de la tête 20’44 // IV / Le sommeil d’Euclide 20’50 // V / Lumière ralentie 21’41**
- CD 10 / 1985–88 / 61’39 // Motion–Émotion 22’01 // Théâtre d’Ombres 39’30 : ... derrière l’image // ... ombres blanches( in memoriam L. Berio)
- CD 11 / 1989–91 / 67’42 // Fabulæ 56’41 : 1/ Fabula 14’34 // 2/ Onoma 16’04 // 3/ Nota 10’27 // 4/ Sonora 15’36 // Mimaméta 10’44
- CD 12 / 1994–96 / 68’14 // La Main Vide 42’35 : 1/ bâton de pluie 19’58 // 2/ la fleur future 12’28 // 3/ inventions 10’22 (in memoriam P. Schaeffer) // Morceaux de Ciels 25’26
- CD 13 / 1999–2001 / 64’13 // Arc, pour Gérard Grisey 8’02(inédit) // La forme du temps est un cercle 55’52 : 1/ concrescence 12’30 // 2/ si loin, si proche 13’36 // 3/ tempi 7’25 // 4/ allures 9’06 // 5/ cercles 13’15
- CD 14 / 2003–05 / 56’52 // La forme de l’esprit est un papillon 34’27 : 1/ ombrages et trouées 21’11(version 2012 inédite) // 2/ couleurs inventées 13’15 // Universnerveux 22’23 (in memoriam K. Stockhausen) (inédit)
- CD 15 / 2006–12 / 55’34 // L’Oreille étonnée (in memoriam O. Messiaen) 14’58(inédit) // Rien n’est réel 25’30 (inédit) : ... sensations 9’12 // ... perceptions // 15’40 Déplacements : 15’30 (inédit) horizontal-vertical // spiral
- 4 DVD-ROM in Diabolus in Musica // Erosphère // L'Expérience Acoustique // Son Vitesse-Lumière (livres interactifs avec examples sonores + acousmographies) Magison vol. 19 – 20 – 21 – 22

Bayle's composition "The Songbird" was included in the compilation album "Musique Concrete" issued by Candide in 1970.

== Bibliography ==
- Notices d’autorité : Système universitaire de documentation • Bibliothèque nationale de France • Fichier d’autorité international virtuel • Bibliothèque du Congrès • Gemeinsame Normdatei • WorldCat
- Musique acousmatique : propositions... positions (Buchet/Chastel, Paris, 1993)
- Parcours d'un compositeur (M. Chion/Musiques et recherches, Bruxelles, 1994)
- L'image de son, technique de mon écoute / Klangbilder (Imke Misch-Ch.v. Blumröder/Lit Verlag, Münster, 2003)
- François Bayle, portrait polychrome (M. de Maule/Ina, Paris, 2004)
- Diabolus in Musica (avec J.-Ch. Thomas) livre/DVD-ROM (Magison vol. 19, Paris, 2008)
- Erosphère (avec J.-Ch. Thomas/M.-N. Moyal/I. Pirès/R. Renouard-Larivière) livre/DVD-ROM (Magison vol. 20, Paris, 2010)
- L'Expérience Acoustique (avec R. Renouard Larivière/L. Bouckaert/N. Sprenger-Ohana/I. Pires/E. Alonso/A. Vande Gorne/Ph. Mion/G. Tissot) livre/DVD-ROM (Magison vol. 21, Paris, 2013)
- Le monde sonore de /The sound word of /Die Klangwelt des / François Bayle (Ch. von Blumröder – M. Erbe ed – Signale 18 – Verlag der Apfel, Vienne, 2013)
- Son Vitesse-Lumière (avec R. Renouard Larivière/L. Siano/P. Couprie/I. Pires/A. Dall'Ara Majek/M. Mary/T. Hünermann/G. Tissot/A. Cohen) livre/DVD-ROM (Magison vol. 22, Paris, 2016)

== Awards and prizes ==
- Commandeur dans l'ordre des Arts et des Lettres
- Chevalier de la Légion d'honneur
- Officier de l'ordre national du Mérite
- 1978 Grand Prix des compositeurs SACEM
- 1981 Grand Prix National du Disque
- 1989 Prix Ars Electronica, Linz
- 1996 Grand Prix de la Musique de la Ville de Paris
- 1997 Hommage du CIME de São Paulo
- 1999 Grand Prix Charles-Cros du président de la République
- 2006 Nommé Doctor honoris causa par l'université de Cologne
- 2007 Grand Prix de la Fondation Del Duca/Académie de France
- 2010 Qwartz Pierre Schaeffer
- 2011 Prix Arthur Honegger 2011
