= Pierre Henry =

French composer

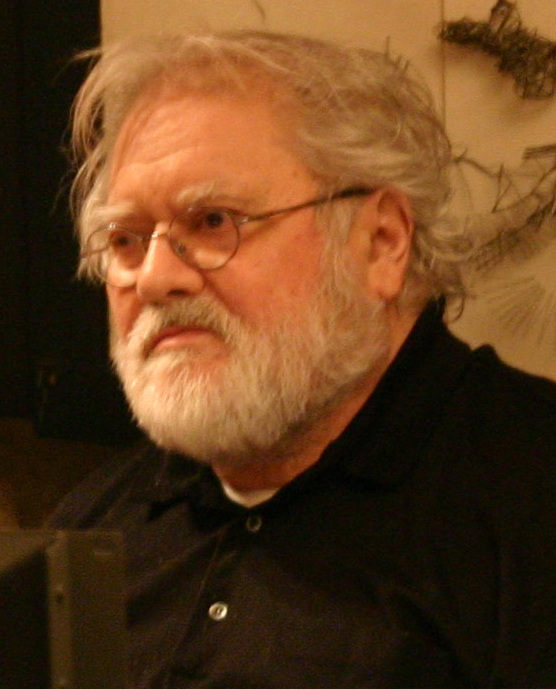
Henry at his home (January 2008)

Pierre Georges Albert François Henry (French pronunciation: [pjɛʁ ɑ̃ʁi]; 9 December 1927 – 5 July 2017) was a French composer known for his significant contributions to musique concrète.

== Biography ==
Henry was born in Paris, France, and began experimenting at the age of 15 with sounds produced by various objects. He became fascinated with the integration of noise into music, now called noise music. He studied with Nadia Boulanger, Olivier Messiaen, and Félix Passerone at the Conservatoire de Paris from 1938 to 1948.

Between 1949 and 1958, Henry worked at the Club d'Essai studio at RTF, which had been founded by Pierre Schaeffer in 1942. During this period, he wrote the 1950 piece Symphonie pour un homme seul, in cooperation with Schaeffer. It is an important early example of musique concrète. Henry also composed the first musique concrète track to appear in a commercial film: the 1952 short film Astrologie ou le miroir de la vie by Jean Grémillon. Henry also scored numerous additional films and ballets.

Two years after leaving the RTF, he co-founded, with Jean Baronnet, the first private electronic music studio in France: Studio Apsone-Cabasse.

Among Henry's works is the 1967 ballet Messe pour le temps présent, a collaboration with composer Michel Colombier and choreographer Maurice Béjart that debuted in Avignon. In 1970, Henry collaborated with British rock band Spooky Tooth on the album Ceremony.

In 1997, a Métamorphose: Messe pour le temps présent compilation recording was released that brought together remixes of various compositions of Henry's by electronic artists Fatboy Slim, Coldcut, Saint Germain, The Mighty Bop and Dimitri From Paris. Composer Christopher Tyng was heavily inspired by Henry's Psyché Rock when writing the theme to the popular animated cartoon show Futurama. The theme is so reminiscent of Psyché Rock that it is considered a variation of the original piece that Henry and Michel Colombier released in 1967. The sound effects off Henry and Colombier's Jericho Jerk from the same album also became a popular sample in hip hop and modern electronic music beginning with D'Angelo's Devil's Pie produced by DJ Premier, later being used by others such as A Tribe Called Quest (Solid Wall Of Sound), James Blake (If the Car Besides You Moves Ahead), Kaytranada (DO IT), and Dreamville's producers (Sacrifices), among numerous others. Additionally, one of his songs from his joint album with Spooky Tooth, Jubilation, was sampled by superduo ¥$ (Kanye West & Ty Dolla $ign) on their song Problematic.

Henry died on Wednesday 5 July 2017 at Saint Joseph's Hospital in Paris, at the age of 89.

== Discography ==
- 1950 Symphonie pour un homme seul (in collaboration with Pierre Schaeffer)
- 1951 Le microphone bien temperé

Musique sans titre
Concerto des ambiguities mit Klavier

- 1952 First film music with musique concrète for Jean Grémillons film Astrologie
- 1953 Orphée 53, experimental opera for Donaueschingen Festival, first opera with musique concrète (together with Pierre Schaeffer)
- 1955 Arcane (ballet)
- 1956 Haut voltage (ballet)
- 1958 Coexistence
- 1959 Investigations
- 1961 La Noire à Soixante
- 1963 La Reine Verte (ballet)
- 1967 Le Voyage (ballet)
- 1967 Variations pour une porte et un soupir (Variations For a Door And a Sigh)
- 1967 Messe pour le temps présent (in cooperation with Michel Colombier)
- 1968 L’Apocalypse de Jean (Die Apokalypse des Johannes) with spoken text
- 1968 Le Voyage (D'Après Le Livre Des Morts Tibétain)
- 1969 Ceremony (with Spooky Tooth)
- 1970 Fragments pour Artaud
- 1971 Nijinsky, clown de dieu (ballet)
- 1973 Machine Danse
- 1973 Prismes
- 1973 Kyldex I (cybernetic ballet)
- 1975 Futuriste, in memory of the Italian Futurists Luigi Russolo
- 1978 Dieu
- 1979 La Dixième Symphonie, tribute to Ludwig van Beethoven
- 1984 La Ville. Die Stadt (Metropolis Paris)
- 1986 La Dixième Symphonie De Beethoven
- 1990 Le livre des morts égyptien (Book of the Dead)
- 1997 Intérieur/Extérieur
- 2015 Choix d'œuvres de 1950–1985 (Selections of works 1950–1985 on VOD Records Cat VOD133 Edition of 400 on 10xVinyl records)
- 2021 Galaxie Pierre Henry
