= Acousmonium =

System for the public playback of electroacoustic music

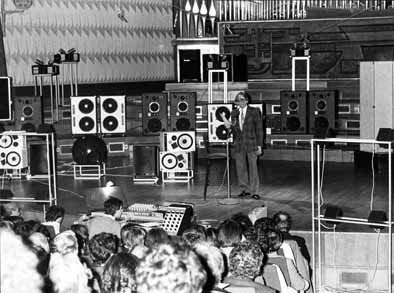
Pierre Schaeffer presenting the Acousmonium in 1974 at GRM

The Acousmonium is the sound diffusion system designed in 1974 by Francois Bayle and used originally by the Groupe de Recherches Musicales at the Maison de Radio France. It consists of 80 loudspeakers of differing size and shape, and was designed for tape playback. As Bayle wrote in a CD sleeve note in 1993, it was

Another utopia, devoted to pure "listening" … as a penetrable "projection area", arranged with a view to immersion in sound, to spatialised polyphony, which is articulated and directed.

The process of distributing compositions of electroacoustic music or Musique concrète across an acousmonium is called diffusion. This is done by the composer or a performer by controlling and adjusting the spatial distribution and volume of the music during playback.

The Acousmonium has been in use more recently. It was, for example, used for a series of concerts held at the Institute of Contemporary Arts, London in May, 2006.

== See also ==
- Acousmatic music
- Birmingham ElectroAcoustic Sound Theatre
