= Acousmatic music =

Form of electroacoustic music

Acousmatic music (from Greek ἄκουσμα akousma, "a thing heard") is a form of electroacoustic music that is specifically composed for presentation using speakers, as opposed to a live performance. It stems from a compositional tradition that dates back to the origins of musique concrète in the late 1940s. Unlike acoustic or electroacoustic musical works that are realized from scores, compositions that are purely acousmatic (in listening terms) often exist solely as fixed media audio recordings.

The compositional practice of acousmatic music features acousmatic sound, sound which is heard but not seen, as a central musical aspect. Other aspects traditionally thought of as 'musical' such as melody, harmony, rhythm, metre may be present but more often consideration is given to sound-based characteristics such as timbre and spectrum. Compositional materials can include sounds derived from musical instruments, voice, electronically generated sound, or sounds employing audio signal processing, as well as general sound effects and field recordings.

The music is produced with the aid of various music technologies, such as digital recorders, digital signal processing tools, digital audio workstations, or analog means such as tape recorders or turntables. Using such technology various sound materials can be combined, juxtaposed, and transformed in any conceivable manner. In this context the compositional method can be seen as a process of what Edgard Varèse termed "sound organisation".

== Origins ==
According to certain historical accounts, the origin of the term acousmatic can be traced back to Pythagoras; the philosopher is believed to have tutored his students from behind a screen so as not to let his presence distract them from the content of his lectures. Under these conditions, the listener focuses on the sounds being produced to heighten the sense of hearing. In 1955, Jérôme Peignot and Pierre Schaeffer were the first to use the term acousmatique to define the listening experience of musique concrète. It is said to be derived from akousmatikoi, the outer circle of Pythagoras' disciples who only heard their teacher speaking from behind a veil. In a similar way, one hears acousmatic music from behind the 'veil' of loudspeakers, without seeing the source of the sound.

== Developments ==
Within academia the terms of acousmatic music and acousmatic art have gained common usage, particularly when referring to contemporary musique concrète; however, there is some dispute as to whether acousmatic practice relates to a style of composition or a way of listening to sound. Scruton defines the experience of sound as inherently acousmatic: as Lydia Goehr paraphrases, "the sound world is not a space into which we can enter; it is a world we treat at a distance".

== Style ==
Acousmatic music may contain sounds that have recognizably musical sources, but may equally present recognizable sources that are beyond the bounds of traditional vocal and instrumental technology. The technology involved transcends the mere reproduction of sounds. Techniques of synthesis and sound processing are employed which may present us with sounds that are unfamiliar and that may defy clear source attribution. Acousmatic compositions may present us with familiar musical events: chords, melodies and rhythms which are easily reconcilable with other forms of music, but may equally present us with events which cannot be classified within such a traditional taxonomy.

== Performance practice ==
Acousmatic compositions are sometimes presented to audiences in concert settings that are often indistinguishable from acoustic recitals, albeit without performers. In an acousmatic concert the sound component is produced using pre-recorded media, or generated in real-time using a computer. The sound material will then be distributed spatially, via multiple loudspeakers, using a practice known as "sound diffusion". The work is often diffused by the composer (if present) but the role of interpreter can also be assumed by another practitioner of the art. To provide a guideline for the spatialization of the work by an interpreter, many composers provide a diffusion score; in its simplest form this might be a graphic representation of the piece with indications for spatial manipulations, relative to a time-line.

== The acousmatic experience ==
In acousmatic music, listeners are challenged to distinguish sounds, not based on their source, but by their sonic quality. As Pierre Schaeffer writes in his Treatise on Musical Objects "The concealment of the causes does not result from a technical imperfection, nor is it an occasional process of variation: it becomes a precondition, a deliberate placing-in-condition of the subject. It is toward it, then, that the question turns around; "what am I hearing?... What exactly are you hearing" -in the sense that one asks the subject to describe not the external references of the sound it perceives but the perception itself."

That music is acousmatic is determined more by how it is listened to, than by whether it is being played from a loudspeaker or not. In understanding the term 'acousmatic' appropriately, it is necessary to distinguish clearly between sound source and sound identity.

Acousmatic music can be said to be that which calls for the listener to perceive sound with reduced or no sensibility to the sound's identity. The listening mode is oriented instead upon more abstract timbral than mimetic aspects of the sound. Pierre Schaeffer has referred to this as écoute réduite (reduced or narrowed-down listening). It can be said that an écoute réduite leads to the perception of music as acousmatic, in the sense that playing sounds from loudspeakers has the potential for obscuring their identity, as the visual reference is removed.

== See also ==
- List of acousmatic-music composers
