= Studio d'Essai =

The Studio d'Essai, later Club d'Essai, was founded in 1942 by Pierre Schaeffer and played a role in the activities of the French resistance during World War II, later becoming a center of musical activity.

In 1942, the French composer and theoretician Pierre Schaeffer began his exploration of radiophony when he joined Jacques Copeau and his pupils in the foundation of the Studio d'Essai de la Radiodiffusion Nationale. The studio originally functioned as a center for the Resistance movement in French radio, which in August 1944, was responsible for the first broadcasts in liberated Paris. It was here that Schaeffer began to experiment with creative radiophonic techniques using the sound technologies of the time.

It was from d'Essai that Schaeffer successfully recorded his first work, which itself appeared on Dix ans d'essais radiophoniques du studio au Club d'Essai: 1942–1952, a compilation of his personal concrète, along with a number of other artists' experimental pieces, released later in his life. The compilation has since become valued as a notable publication of the experimental music genre.

Following Schaeffer's work with Studio d'Essai at Radiodiffusion Nationale during the early 1940s he was credited with originating the theory and practice of musique concrète. The Studio d'Essai was renamed Club d 'Essai de la Radiodiffusion-Télévision Française in 1946 and in the same year Schaeffer discussed, in writing, the question surrounding the transformation of time perceived through recording. The essay evidenced knowledge of sound manipulation techniques he would further exploit compositionally. In 1948, Schaeffer formally initiated “research in to noises” at the Club d'Essai, and on 5 October 1948, the results of his initial experimentation were premiered at a concert performed in Paris. Five works for phonograph (known collectively as Cinq études de bruits—Five Studies of Noises), including "Etude violette" (study in purple) and "Etude aux chemins de fer" (study of the railroads), were presented.
