= Musique concrète =

Form of electroacoustic music

"Time Is Running Out", a 2012 musique concrète composition by Salakapakka Sound System

Musique concrète (French pronunciation: [myzik kɔ̃kʁɛt]; lit. 'concrete music') (Note: Schaeffer (2012), p. xii: "[A] problem for any translator of an academic work in French is that the language is relatively abstract and theoretical compared to English; one might even say that the mode of thinking itself tends to be more schematic, with a readiness to see material for study in terms of highly abstract dualisms and correlations, which on occasion does not sit easily with the perhaps more pragmatic English language. This creates several problems of translation affecting key terms. Perhaps the most obvious of these is the word concret/concrète itself. The word in French, which has nothing of the familiar meaning of "concrete" in English, is used throughout [In Search of a Concrete Music] with all its usual French connotations of "palpable", "nontheoretical", and "experiential", all of which pertain to a greater or lesser extent to the type of music Schaeffer is pioneering. Despite the risk of ambiguity, we decided to translate it with the English word concrete in most contexts, as an expression such as "real-world" does not cover the original's range of meanings, and in particular it would not link with the main subject ...") is a type of music composition that utilizes recorded sounds as raw material. Sounds are often modified through the application of audio signal processing and tape music techniques, and may be assembled into a form of sound collage. (Note: Musique concrète has been referred to as a sound collage technique.) It can feature sounds derived from recordings of musical instruments, the human voice, and the natural environment, as well as those created using sound synthesis and computer-based digital signal processing. Compositions in this idiom are not restricted to the normal musical rules of melody, harmony, rhythm, and metre. The technique exploits acousmatic sound, such that sound identities can often be intentionally obscured or appear unconnected to their source cause.

The theoretical basis of musique concrète as a compositional practice was developed by French composer Pierre Schaeffer, beginning in the early 1940s. It was largely an attempt to differentiate between music based on the abstract medium of notation and that created using so-called sound objects (French: l'objet sonore). By the early 1950s, musique concrète was contrasted with "pure" elektronische Musik as then developed in West Germany – based solely on the use of electronically produced sounds rather than recorded sounds – but the distinction has since been blurred such that the term "electronic music" covers both meanings. Schaeffer's work resulted in the establishment of France's Groupe de Recherches de Musique Concrète (GRMC), which attracted important figures including Pierre Henry, Luc Ferrari, Pierre Boulez, Karlheinz Stockhausen, Edgard Varèse, and Iannis Xenakis. From the late 1960s onward, and particularly in France, the term acousmatic music (French: musique acousmatique) was used in reference to fixed media compositions that utilized both musique concrète-based techniques and live sound spatialisation.

== History ==
=== Beginnings ===
In 1928, music critic André Cœuroy wrote in his book, Panorama of Contemporary Music, that "perhaps the time is not far off when a composer will be able to represent through recording, music specifically composed for the gramophone". In the same period, the American composer Henry Cowell, in referring to the projects of Nikolai Lopatnikoff, believed that "there was a wide field open for the composition of music for phonographic discs". This sentiment was echoed further in 1930 by Igor Stravinsky, when he stated in the revue Kultur und Schallplatte that "there will be a greater interest in creating music in a way that will be peculiar to the gramophone record". The following year, in 1931, Boris de Schloezer also expressed the opinion that one could write for the gramophone or for the wireless just as one can for the piano or the violin. Shortly after, German art theorist Rudolf Arnheim discussed the effects of microphonic recording in an essay entitled "Radio", published in 1936. In it the idea of a creative role for the recording medium was introduced and Arnheim stated that: "The rediscovery of the musicality of sound in noise and in language, and the reunification of music, noise and language in order to obtain a unity of material: that is one of the chief artistic tasks of radio".

Possible antecedents to musique concrète have been noted; Walter Ruttmann's film Wochenende (Weekend) (1930), a work of "blind cinema" without visuals, introduced recordings of environmental sound, to represent the urban soundscape of Berlin, two decades before musique concrète was formalised. Ruttmann's soundtrack has been retrospectively called musique concrète. According to Seth Kim-Cohen, the piece was the first to "organise 'concrete' sounds into a formal, artistic composition." Composer Irwin Bazelon referred to a sound collage in the film Dr. Jekyll and Mr. Hyde (1931), during the first transformation scene, as "pre-musique concrète". Ottorino Respighi's Pines of Rome (Italian: Pini di Roma; 1924) calls for a phonograph recording of birdsong to be played during the third movement.

=== Pierre Schaeffer and Studio d'Essai ===
Pierre Schaeffer with the phonogène

In 1942, French composer and theoretician Pierre Schaeffer began his exploration of radiophony when he joined Jacques Copeau and his pupils in the foundation of the Studio d'Essai de la Radiodiffusion Nationale. The studio originally functioned as a center for the French Resistance on radio, which in August 1944 was responsible for the first broadcasts in liberated Paris. It was here that Schaeffer began to experiment with creative radiophonic techniques using the sound technologies of the time. In 1948, Schaeffer began to keep a set of journals describing his attempt to create a "symphony of noises". These journals were published in 1952 as A la recherche d'une musique concrète, and according to Brian Kane, author of Sound Unseen: Acousmatic Sound in Theory and Practice, Schaeffer was driven by: "a compositional desire to construct music from concrete objects – no matter how unsatisfactory the initial results – and a theoretical desire to find a vocabulary, solfège, or method upon which to ground such music."

The development of Schaeffer's practice was informed by encounters with voice actors, and microphone usage and radiophonic art played an important part in inspiring and consolidating Schaeffer's conception of sound-based composition. Another important influence on Schaeffer's practice was cinema, and the techniques of recording and montage, which were originally associated with cinematographic practice, came to "serve as the substrate of musique concrète". Marc Battier notes that, prior to Schaeffer, Jean Epstein drew attention to the manner in which sound recording revealed what was hidden in the act of basic acoustic listening. Epstein's reference to this "phenomenon of an epiphanic being", which appears through the transduction of sound, proved influential on Schaeffer's concept of reduced listening. Schaeffer would explicitly cite Jean Epstein with reference to his use of extra-musical sound material. Epstein had already imagined that "through the transposition of natural sounds, it becomes possible to create chords and dissonances, melodies and symphonies of noise, which are a new and specifically cinematographic music".

=== Halim El-Dabh ===
As a student in Cairo in the early to mid-1940s, Egyptian composer Halim El-Dabh began experimenting with electroacoustic music using a cumbersome wire recorder. He recorded the sounds of an ancient zaar ceremony and at the Middle East Radio studios processed the material using reverberation, echo, voltage controls, and re-recording. The resulting tape-based composition, entitled The Expression of Zaar, was presented in 1944 at an art gallery event in Cairo. El-Dabh has described his initial activities as an attempt to unlock "the inner sound" of the recordings. While his early compositional work was not widely known outside of Egypt at the time, El-Dabh would eventually gain recognition for his influential work at the Columbia-Princeton Electronic Music Center in Manhattan in the late 1950s.

=== Club d'Essai and Cinq études de bruits ===
Following Schaeffer's work with Studio d'Essai at Radiodiffusion Nationale during the early 1940s he was credited with originating the theory and practice of musique concrète. The Studio d'Essai was renamed Club d'Essai de la Radiodiffusion-Télévision Française in 1946 and in the same year Schaeffer discussed, in writing, the question surrounding the transformation of time perceived through recording. The essay evidenced knowledge of sound manipulation techniques he would further exploit compositionally. In 1948 Schaeffer formally initiated "research in to noises" at the Club d'Essai and on 5 October 1948 the results of his initial experimentation were premiered at a concert given in Paris. Five works for phonograph – known collectively as Cinq études de bruits (Five Studies of Noises) including Étude violette (Study in Purple) and Étude aux chemins de fer (Study with Railroads) – were presented.

=== Musique concrète ===
By 1949, Schaeffer's compositional work was known publicly as musique concrète. Schaeffer stated: "when I proposed the term 'musique concrète,' I intended ... to point out an opposition with the way musical work usually goes. Instead of notating musical ideas on paper with the symbols of solfege and entrusting their realization to well-known instruments, the question was to collect concrete sounds, wherever they came from, and to abstract the musical values they were potentially containing". According to Pierre Henry, "musique concrète was not a study of timbre, it is focused on envelopes, forms. It must be presented by means of non-traditional characteristics, you see ... one might say that the origin of this music is also found in the interest in 'plastifying' music, of rendering it plastic like sculpture...musique concrète, in my opinion ... led to a manner of composing, indeed, a new mental framework of composing". Schaeffer had developed an aesthetic that was centred upon the use of sound as a primary compositional resource. The aesthetic also emphasised the importance of play (jeu) in the practice of sound based composition. Schaeffer's use of the word jeu, from the verb jouer, carries the same double meaning as the English verb to play: 'to enjoy oneself by interacting with one's surroundings', as well as 'to operate a musical instrument'. During this early development of music concrete, Schaeffer continued participation in his Club d’Essai. Prior to their collaboration on Timbres-Durées (1952), Schaeffer’s acquaintance and serialist composer, Olivier Messiaen, periodically participated in broadcasts, round tables, and critiques surrounding musique concrète.

=== Groupe de Recherche de Musique Concrète ===
By 1951 the work of Schaeffer, composer-percussionist Pierre Henry, and sound engineer Jacques Poullin had received official recognition and the Groupe de Recherches de Musique Concrète, Club d 'Essai de la Radiodiffusion-Télévision Française was established at RTF in Paris, the ancestor of the ORTF. At RTF the GRMC established the first purpose-built electroacoustic music studio. It quickly attracted many who either were or were later to become notable composers, including Olivier Messiaen, Pierre Boulez, Jean Barraqué, Karlheinz Stockhausen, Edgard Varèse, Iannis Xenakis, Michel Philippot, and Arthur Honegger. Compositional "output from 1951 to 1953 comprised Étude I (1951) and Étude II (1951) by Boulez, Timbres-durées (1952) by Messiaen, Étude aux mille collants (1952) by Stockhausen, Le microphone bien tempéré (1952) and La voile d'Orphée (1953) by Henry, Étude I (1953) by Philippot, Étude (1953) by Barraqué, the mixed pieces Toute la lyre (1951) and Orphée 53 (1953) by Schaeffer/Henry, and the film music Masquerage (1952) by Schaeffer and Astrologie (1953) by Henry. In 1954 Varèse and Honegger visited to work on the tape parts of Déserts and La rivière endormie".

In the early and mid 1950s Schaeffer's commitments to RTF included official missions that often required extended absences from the studios. This led him to invest Philippe Arthuys with responsibility for the GRMC in his absence, with Pierre Henry operating as Director of Works. Pierre Henry's composing talent developed greatly during this period at the GRMC and he worked with experimental filmmakers such as Max de Haas, Jean Grémillon, Enrico Fulchignoni, and Jean Rouch and with choreographers including Dick Sanders and Maurice Béjart. Schaeffer returned to run the group at the end of 1957, and immediately stated his disapproval of the direction the GRMC had taken. A proposal was then made to "renew completely the spirit, the methods and the personnel of the Group, with a view to undertake research and to offer a much needed welcome to young composers".

=== Groupe de Recherches Musicales ===
Following the emergence of differences within the GRMC, Pierre Henry, Philippe Arthuys, and several of their colleagues, resigned in April 1958. Schaeffer created a new collective, called Groupe de Recherches Musicales (GRM), and set about recruiting new members including Michel Chion, Luc Ferrari, Beatriz Ferreyra, François-Bernard Mâche, Iannis Xenakis, Bernard Parmegiani, and Mireille Chamass-Kyrou. Later arrivals included Ivo Malec, Philippe Carson, Romuald Vandelle, Edgardo Canton and François Bayle.

GRM was one of several theoretical and experimental groups working under the umbrella of the Schaeffer-led Service de la Recherche at ORTF (1960–1974). Together with the GRM, three other groups existed: the Groupe de Recherches Image GRI, the Groupe de Recherches Technologiques GRT and the Groupe de Recherches Langage which became the Groupe d'Etudes Critiques. Communication was the one theme that unified the various groups, all of which were devoted to production and creation. In terms of the question "Who says what to whom?" Schaeffer added "How?", thereby creating a platform for research into audiovisual communication and mass media, audible phenomena and music in general (including non-Western musics). At the GRM the theoretical teaching remained based on practice and could be summed up in the catch phrase do and listen.

Schaeffer kept up a practice established with the GRMC of delegating the functions (though not the title) of Group Director to colleagues. Since 1961 GRM has had six Group Directors: Michel Philippot (1960–1961), Luc Ferrari (1962–1963), Bernard Baschet and François Vercken (1964–1966). From the beginning of 1966, François Bayle took over the direction for the duration of thirty-one years, to 1997. He was then replaced by Daniel Teruggi.

=== Traité des objets musicaux ===
The group continued to refine Schaeffer's ideas and strengthened the concept of musique acousmatique. Schaeffer had borrowed the term acousmatic from Pythagoras and defined it as: "Acousmatic, adjective: referring to a sound that one hears without seeing the causes behind it". In 1966 Schaeffer published the book Traité des objets musicaux (Treatise on Musical Objects) which represented the culmination of some 20 years of research in the field of musique concrète. In conjunction with this publication, a set of sound recordings was produced, entitled Le solfège de l'objet sonore (Music Theory of the Acoustic Object), to provide examples of concepts dealt with in the treatise.

== Technology ==
The development of musique concrète was facilitated by the emergence of new music technology in post-war Europe. Access to microphones, phonographs, and later magnetic tape recorders (created in 1939 and acquired by the Schaeffer's Groupe de Recherche de Musique Concrète (Research Group on Concrete Music) in 1952), facilitated by an association with the French national broadcasting organization, at that time the Radiodiffusion-Télévision Française, gave Schaeffer and his colleagues an opportunity to experiment with recording technology and tape manipulation.

=== Initial tools of musique concrète ===
In 1948, a typical radio studio consisted of a series of shellac record players, a shellac record recorder, a mixing desk with rotating potentiometers, mechanical reverberation units, filters, and microphones. This technology made a number of limited operations available to a composer:

- Shellac record players: could play sound forwards or in reverse; could change speed at fixed ratios, permitting limited transposition.
- Shellac recorder: would record any result coming out of the mixing desk.
- Mixing desk: would permit several sources to be mixed together with an independent control of the gain or volume of the sound. The result of the mixing was sent to the recorder and to the monitoring loudspeakers. Signals could be sent to the filters or the reverberation unit.
- Mechanical reverberation: made of a metal plate or a series of springs that created an artificial reverb effect.
- Filters: two kinds of filters, third-octave octave filter banks and high- and low-pass filters. They allowed the elimination or enhancement of selected frequencies.
- Microphones: essential tool for capturing sound.

The application of the above technologies in the creation of musique concrète led to the development of a number of sound manipulation techniques including:

- Sound transposition: reading a sound at a different speed than the one at which it was recorded.
- Sound looping: composers developed a skilled technique in order to create loops at specific locations within a recording.
- Sound-sample extraction: a hand-controlled method that required delicate manipulation to get a clean sample of sound. It entailed letting the stylus read only a small segment of a record. Used in the Symphonie pour un homme seul.
- Filtering: by eliminating certain frequencies from a signal, the remains would keep some trace of the original sound but alter it often beyond recognition.

=== Magnetic tape ===
The first tape recorders started arriving at ORTF in 1949; however, they were much less reliable than the shellac players, to the point that the Symphonie pour un homme seul (1950–1951) was mainly composed with records even if the tape recorder was available. In 1950, when the machines finally functioned correctly, the techniques of the studio were expanded. A range of new sound manipulation practices were explored using improved media manipulation methods and operations such as continuous speed variation. A completely new possibility of organising sounds appeared with tape editing, which permitted tape to be spliced and arranged with much more precision. The "axe-cut junctions" were replaced with micrometric junctions and a whole new technique of production, less dependent on performance skills, could be developed. Tape editing brought a new technique called "micromontage", in which very small fragments of sound were edited together, thus creating completely new sounds or structures on a larger scale.

=== Development of novel devices ===
During the GRMC period from 1951 to 1958, Schaeffer and Poullin developed a number of novel sound creation tools. These included a three-track tape recorder; a machine with ten playback heads to replay tape loops in echo (the morphophone); a keyboard-controlled machine to play tape loops at preset speeds (the keyboard, chromatic, or Tolana phonogène); a slide-controlled machine to replay tape loops at a continuously variable range of speeds (the handle, continuous, or Sareg phonogène); and a device to distribute an encoded track across four loudspeakers, including one hanging from the centre of the ceiling (the potentiomètre d'espace).

==== Phonogène ====
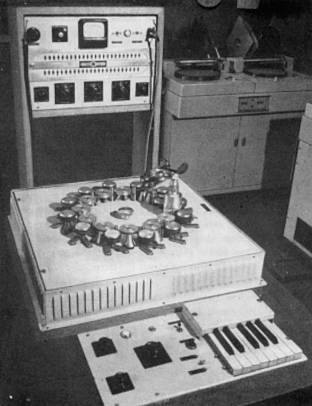
The chromatic phonogène

Speed variation was a powerful tool for sound design applications. It had been identified that transformations brought about by varying playback speed lead to modification in the character of the sound material:

- Variation in the sounds' length, in a manner directly proportional to the ratio of speed variation.
- Variation in length is coupled with a variation in pitch, and is also proportional to the ratio of speed variation.
- A sound's attack characteristic is altered, whereby it is either dislocated from succeeding events, or the energy of the attack is more sharply focused.
- The distribution of spectral energy is altered, thereby influencing how the resulting timbre might be perceived, relative to its original unaltered state.

The phonogène was a machine capable of modifying sound structure significantly and it provided composers with a means to adapt sound to meet specific compositional contexts. The initial phonogènes were manufactured in 1953 by two subcontractors: the chromatic phonogène by a company called Tolana, and the sliding version by the SAREG Company. A third version was developed later at ORTF. An outline of the unique capabilities of the various phonogènes can be seen here:

- Chromatic: The chromatic phonogène was controlled through a one-octave keyboard. Multiple capstans of differing diameters vary the tape speed over a single stationary magnetic tape head. A tape loop was put into the machine, and when a key was played, it would act on an individual pinch roller / capstan arrangement and cause the tape to be played at a specific speed. The machine worked with short sounds only.
- Sliding: The sliding phonogène (also called continuous-variation phonogène) provided continuous variation of tape speed using a control rod. The range allowed the motor to arrive at almost a stop position, always through a continuous variation. It was basically a normal tape recorder but with the ability to control its speed, so it could modify any length of tape. One of the earliest examples of its use can be heard in Voile d'Orphée by Pierre Henry (1953), where a lengthy glissando is used to symbolise the removal of Orpheus's veil as he enters hell.
- Universal: A final version called the universal phonogène was completed in 1963. The device's main ability was that it enabled the dissociation of pitch variation from time variation. This was the starting point for methods that would later become widely available using digital technology, for instance harmonising (transposing sound without modifying duration) and time stretching (modifying duration without pitch modification). This was obtained through a rotating magnetic head called the Springer temporal regulator, an ancestor of the rotating heads used in video machines.

==== Three-head tape recorder ====
This original tape recorder was one of the first machines permitting the simultaneous listening of several synchronised sources. Until 1958 musique concrète, radio and the studio machines were monophonic. The three-head tape recorder superposed three magnetic tapes that were dragged by a common motor, each tape having an independent spool. The objective was to keep the three tapes synchronised from a common starting point. Works could then be conceived polyphonically, and thus each head conveyed a part of the information and was listened to through a dedicated loudspeaker. It was an ancestor of the multi-track player (four then eight tracks) that appeared in the 1960s. Timbres Durées by Olivier Messiaen with the technical assistance of Pierre Henry was the first work composed for this tape recorder in 1952. A rapid rhythmic polyphony was distributed over the three channels.

==== Morphophone ====
The Morphophone

This machine was conceived to build complex forms through repetition, and accumulation of events through delays, filtering and feedback. It consisted of a large rotating disk, 50 cm in diameter, on which was stuck a tape with its magnetic side facing outward. A series of twelve movable magnetic heads (one each recording head and erasing head, and ten playback heads) were positioned around the disk, in contact with the tape. A sound up to four seconds long could be recorded on the looped tape and the ten playback heads would then read the information with different delays, according to their (adjustable) positions around the disk. A separate amplifier and band-pass filter for each head could modify the spectrum of the sound, and additional feedback loops could transmit the information to the recording head. The resulting repetitions of a sound occurred at different time intervals, and could be filtered or modified through feedback. This system was also easily capable of producing artificial reverberation or continuous sounds.

==== Early sound spatialisation system ====
Pierre Henry using induction coils to control sound spatially

At the premiere of Pierre Schaeffer's Symphonie pour un homme seul in 1951, a system that was designed for the spatial control of sound was tested. It was called a relief desk (pupitre de relief, but also referred to as pupitre d'espace or potentiomètre d'espace) and was intended to control the dynamic level of music played from several shellac players. This created a stereophonic effect by controlling the positioning of a monophonic sound source. One of five tracks, provided by a purpose-built tape machine, was controlled by the performer and the other four tracks each supplied a single loudspeaker. This provided a mixture of live and preset sound positions. The placement of loudspeakers in the performance space included two loudspeakers at the front right and left of the audience, one placed at the rear, and in the centre of the space a loudspeaker was placed in a high position above the audience. The sounds could therefore be moved around the audience, rather than just across the front stage. On stage, the control system allowed a performer to position a sound either to the left or right, above or behind the audience, simply by moving a small, hand held transmitter coil towards or away from four somewhat larger receiver coils arranged around the performer in a manner reflecting the loudspeaker positions. A contemporary eyewitness described the potentiomètre d'espace in normal use:

One found one's self sitting in a small studio which was equipped with four loudspeakers – two in front of one – right and left; one behind one and a fourth suspended above. In the front center were four large loops and an executant moving a small magnetic unit through the air. The four loops controlled the four speakers, and while all four were giving off sounds all the time, the distance of the unit from the loops determined the volume of sound sent out from each.
The music thus came to one at varying intensity from various parts of the room, and this spatial projection gave new sense to the rather abstract sequence of sound originally recorded.

The central concept underlying this method was the notion that music should be controlled during public presentation in order to create a performance situation; an attitude that has stayed with acousmatic music to the present day.

=== Coupigny synthesiser and Studio 54 mixing desk ===
Pierre Schaeffer at the Studio 54 desk adjusting a Moog. The Coupigny is in the row below.

After the longstanding rivalry with the electronic music of the Cologne studio had subsided, in 1970 the GRM finally created an electronic studio using tools developed by the physicist Enrico Chiarucci, called the Studio 54, which featured the "Coupigny modular synthesiser" and a Moog synthesiser. The Coupigny synthesiser, named for its designer François Coupigny, director of the Group for Technical Research, and the Studio 54 mixing desk had a major influence on the evolution of GRM and from the point of their introduction on they brought a new quality to the music. The mixing desk and synthesiser were combined in one unit and were created specifically for the creation of musique concrète.

The design of the desk was influenced by trade union rules at French National Radio that required technicians and production staff to have clearly defined duties. The solitary practice of musique concrète composition did not suit a system that involved three operators: one in charge of the machines, a second controlling the mixing desk, and third to provide guidance to the others. Because of this the synthesiser and desk were combined and organised in a manner that allowed it to be used easily by a composer. Independently of the mixing tracks (24 in total), it had a coupled connection patch that permitted the organisation of the machines within the studio. It also had a number of remote controls for operating tape recorders. The system was easily adaptable to any context, particularly that of interfacing with external equipment.

Before the late 1960s the musique concrète produced at GRM had largely been based on the recording and manipulation of sounds, but synthesised sounds had featured in a number of works prior to the introduction of the Coupigny. Pierre Henry had used oscillators to produce sounds as early as 1955. But a synthesiser with envelope control was something Pierre Schaeffer was against, since it favoured the preconception of music and therefore deviated from Schaeffer's principle of "making through listening". Because of Schaeffer's concerns the Coupigny synthesiser was conceived as a sound-event generator with parameters controlled globally, without a means to define values as precisely as some other synthesisers of the day.

The development of the machine was constrained by several factors. It needed to be modular and the modules had to be easily interconnected (so that the synthesiser would have more modules than slots and it would have an easy-to-use patch). It also needed to include all the major functions of a modular synthesiser including oscillators, noise-generators, filters, ring-modulators, but an intermodulation facility was viewed as the primary requirement; to enable complex synthesis processes such as frequency modulation, amplitude modulation, and modulation via an external source. No keyboard was attached to the synthesiser and instead a specific and somewhat complex envelope generator was used to shape sound. This synthesiser was well-adapted to the production of continuous and complex sounds using intermodulation techniques such as cross-synthesis and frequency modulation but was less effective in generating precisely defined frequencies and triggering specific sounds.

The Coupigny synthesiser also served as the model for a smaller, portable unit, which has been used down to the present day.

=== Acousmonium ===
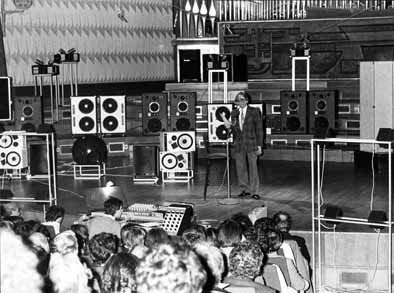
Schaeffer presenting the Acousmonium

In 1966 composer and technician François Bayle was placed in charge of the Groupe de Recherches Musicales and in 1975, GRM was integrated with the new Institut national de l'audiovisuel (INA – Audiovisual National Institute) with Bayle as its head. In taking the lead on work that began in the early 1950s, with Jacques Poullin's potentiomètre d'espace, a system designed to move monophonic sound sources across four speakers, Bayle and the engineer Jean-Claude Lallemand created an orchestra of loudspeakers (un orchestre de haut-parleurs) known as the Acousmonium in 1974. An inaugural concert took place on 14 February 1974 at the Espace Pierre Cardin in Paris with a presentation of Bayle's Expérience acoustique.

The Acousmonium is a specialised sound reinforcement system consisting of between 50 and 100 loudspeakers, depending on the character of the concert, of varying shape and size. The system was designed specifically for the concert presentation of musique-concrète-based works but with the added enhancement of sound spatialisation. Loudspeakers are placed both on stage and at positions throughout the performance space and a mixing console is used to manipulate the placement of acousmatic material across the speaker array, using a performative technique known as sound diffusion. Bayle has commented that the purpose of the Acousmonium is to "substitute a momentary classical disposition of sound making, which diffuses the sound from the circumference towards the centre of the hall, by a group of sound projectors which form an 'orchestration' of the acoustic image".

As of 2010, the Acousmonium was still performing, with 64 speakers, 35 amplifiers, and 2 consoles.

== In popular music ==
Although Schaeffer's work aimed to defamiliarize the used sounds, other composers favoured the familiarity of source material by using snippets of music or speech taken from popular entertainment and mass media, with the ethic that "truly contemporary art should reflect not just nature or the industrial-urban environment but the mediascape in which humans increasingly dwelled", according to writer Simon Reynolds. Composers such as James Tenney and Arne Mellnäs created pieces in the 1960s that recontextualised the music of Elvis Presley and the singer's own voice, respectively, while later in the decade, Bernard Parmegiani created the pieces Pop'electric and Du pop a l'ane, which used fragments of musical genres such as easy listening, dixieland, classical music and progressive rock. Reynolds writes that this approach continued in the later work of musicians Matmos, whose A Chance to Cut Is a Chance to Cure (2001) was created with the sounds of cosmetic surgery, and the "pop-collage" work of John Oswald, who referred to the approach as 'plunderphonics'. Oswald's Plexure (1993) was created using recognisable elements of rock and pop music from 1982 to 1992.

=== 1960s ===
In the 1960s, as popular music began to increase in cultural importance and question its role as commercial entertainment, many popular musicians began taking influence from the post-war avant-garde, including the Beatles, who incorporated techniques such as tape loops, speed manipulation, and reverse playback in their song "Tomorrow Never Knows" (1966). Bernard Gendron describes the Beatles' musique concrète experimentation as helping popularise avant-garde art in the era, alongside Jimi Hendrix's use of noise and feedback, Bob Dylan's surreal lyricism and Frank Zappa's "ironic detachment". In The Wire, Edwin Pouncey wrote that the 1960s represented the height of confluence between rock and academic music, noting that composers like Luciano Berio and Pierre Henry found likeness in the "distorting-mirror" sound of psychedelic rock, and that concrète's contrasting tones and timbres were suited to the effects of psychedelic drugs.

Following the Beatles' example, many groups incorporated found sounds into otherwise typical pop songs for psychedelic effect, resulting in "pop and rock musique concrète flirtations"; examples include the Lovin' Spoonful's "Summer in the City" (1966), Love's "7 and 7 Is" (1967) and The Box Tops' "The Letter" (1967). Popular musicians more versed in modern classical and experimental music utilised elements of musique concrète more maturely, including Zappa and the Mothers of Invention on pieces like the Edgard Varèse tribute "The Return of the Son of Monster Magnet" (1966), "The Chrome Planted Megaphone of Destiny" and Lumpy Gravy (both 1968), and Jefferson Airplane's "Would You Like a Snack?" (1968), while the Grateful Dead's album Anthem of the Sun (1968), which featured Berio student Phil Lesh on bass, features musique concrète passages that Pouncey compared to Varèse's Deserts and the "keyboard deconstructions" of John Cage and Conlon Nancarrow. The Beatles continued their use of concrète on songs such as "Strawberry Fields Forever", "Being for the Benefit of Mr. Kite!" and "I Am the Walrus" (all 1967), before the approach climaxed with the pure musique concrète piece "Revolution 9" (1968); afterwards, John Lennon, alongside wife and Fluxus artist Yoko Ono, continued the approach on their solo works Two Virgins (1968) and Life with the Lions (1969).

=== 1970s ===
Weather Report incorporated musique concrète into their studio albums throughout the 1970s, and notably the song Milky Way (1971) was created by manipulating recordings of echoes from a saxophone played into a piano. The musique concrète elements present on Pink Floyd's best-selling album The Dark Side of the Moon (1973), including the cash register sounds on "Money", have been cited as notable examples of the practice's influence on popular music. Also in 1973, German band Faust released The Faust Tapes; priced in the United Kingdom at 49 pence, the album was described by writer Chris Jones as "a contender for the most widely heard piece of musique concrete" after "Revolution 9". Another German group, Kraftwerk, achieved a surprise hit in 1975 with "Autobahn", which contained a "sampled collage of revving engines, horns and traffic noise". Stephen Dalton of The Times wrote: "This droll blend of accessible pop and avant-garde musique concrete propelled Kraftwerk across America for three months". Steve Taylor writes that industrial groups Throbbing Gristle and Cabaret Voltaire continued the concrète tradition with collages constructed with tape manipulation and loops, while Ian Inglis credits Brian Eno for introducing new sensibilities "about what could be in included in the canon of popular music", citing his 1970s ambient work and the musique concrete collages on My Life in the Bush of Ghosts (1981), which combines tape samples with synthesised sounds.

=== 1980s and beyond ===
With the emergence of hip-hop in the 1980s, deejays such as Grandmaster Flash utilised turntables to "[montage] in real time" with portions of rock, R&B and disco records, in order to create groove-based music with percussive scratching; this provided a parallel breakthrough to collage artist Christian Marclay's use of vinyl records as a "noise-generating medium" in his own work. Reynolds wrote: "As sampling technology grew more affordable, DJs-turned-producers like Eric B. developed hip-hop into a studio-based art. Although there was no direct line traceable between the two Pierres and Marley Marl, it was as if musique concrète went truant from the academy and became street music, the soundtrack to block parties and driving." He described this era of hip-hop as "the most vibrant and flourishing descendant – albeit an indirect one – of musique concrète". Chicago Reader's J. Niimi writes that when Public Enemy producers the Bomb Squad "unwittingly revisited" the concept of musique concrète with their sample-based music, they proved that the technique "worked great as pop".

In 1989, John Diliberto of Music Technology described the group Art of Noise as having both digitised and synthesised musique concrète and "locked it into a crunching groove and turned it into dance music for the '80s". He wrote that while Schaeffer and Henry used tapes in their work, Art of Noise "uses Fairlight CMIs and Akai S1000 samplers and the skyscrapers of multitrack recording to create their updated sound". As described by Will Hodgkinson, Art of Noise brought classical and avant-garde sounds into pop by "[aiming] to emulate the musique concrète composers of the 1950s" via Fairlight samplers instead of tape. In a piece for Pitchfork, musicians Matmos noted the use of musique concrète in later popular music, including the crying baby effects in Aaliyah's "Are You That Somebody?" (1998) or Missy Elliott's "backwards chorus", while noting that the aesthetic was arguably built upon by works including Art of Noise's "Close (to the Edit)" (1984), Meat Beat Manifesto's Storm the Studio (1989) and the work of Public Enemy, Negativland and People Like Us, among other examples. Chuck Eddy writes that, by 1991, heavy metal bands began absorbing a wealth of esoteric outside inspirations, citing the "found-sound jackhammer-and-national-anthem musique concrète" on Slaughter's "Up All Night" (1990) as a key example.

In 2025, Daniel Blumberg's Oscar-winning score for the film The Brutalist used a concrète style. Other film composers have cited musique concrète as an influence, such as the French composer Mathieu Lamboley, who scored the television series Lupin and Jean-Paul Salomé's 2026 film L'affaire Bojarski, which uses the sounds of a banknote‑printing press.

== See also ==
- Audium
- Birmingham ElectroAcoustic Sound Theatre
- Canadian Electroacoustic Community
- Computer music
- Concrete poetry
- Noise music
- Sound art
- Sound collage
- Sound design
- Sound engineering
