= Sound object =

Term in electronic music theory

In musique concrete and electronic music theory the term sound object (originally l'objet sonore) is used to refer to a primary unit of sonic material and often specifically refers to recorded sound rather than written music using manuscript or a score. It was coined by Pierre Schaeffer in his publication Traité des objets musicaux (1966).

== Definitions ==
=== Pierre Schaeffer ===
According to Schaeffer:

This unit of sound [sound-object] is the equivalent to a unit of breath or articulation, a unit of instrumental gesture. The sound object is therefore an acoustic action and intention of listening.

Schaeffer believed that the sound object should be free from its sonic origin (its sound source, or source bonding) so that a listener could not identify it, what he termed as acousmatic listening. Schaeffer's four functions of the "What Can be Heard" include:

1. A sonic entity is detected by its signal being picked up by the autonomous mechanism of hearing (ouïr)

2. The signalled sonic entity (having been detected) 'sound character' is deciphered by the active perception of listening (écouter)

3. The signalled sonic entity is then subjected to a twofold focused attention that judges then describes it

4. The signalled sonic entities' significance is then understood by abstraction, comparison, deduction and by linking it to different sources and types (either the initial meaning is confirmed or if denied an additional meaning is worked out.

This leads to the acousmatic situation that is focused on subjective "listening itself which becomes the phenomena under study" rather than the object sound source. Music theorist Brian Kane, in his book Sound Unseen notes that Schaeffer states, "the sound object, is never revealed clearly except in the acousmatic experience.”

Schaeffer's theory of acousmatic experience, the sound object, and a technique he called reduced listening (écoute réduite) utilizes a phenomenological approach derived from the work of Edmund Husserl and Maurice Merleau-Ponty. According to Kane a good grasp of Husserlian theory is required in order to fully comprehend the relationship between the three.

=== Curtis Roads ===
Curtis Roads, in his 2001 book 'Microsound', while attributing the origin of the term to Pierre Schaeffer, describes the sound object as "a basic unit of musical structure, generalizing the traditional concept of note to include complex and mutating sound events on a time scale ranging from a fraction of a second to several seconds." This broader interpretation includes the following categories of sound objects:

1. Infinite The ideal time span of mathematical durations such as the infinite sine waves of classical Fourier analysis.

2. Supra A time scale beyond that of an individual composition and extending into months, years, decades, and centuries.

3. Macro The time scale of overall musical architecture or form, measured in minutes or hours, or in extreme cases, days.

4. Meso Divisions of form. Groupings of sound objects into hierarchies of phrase structures of various sizes, measured in minutes or seconds.

5. Sound object A basic unit of musical structure, generalizing the traditional concept of note to include complex and mutating sound events on a time scale ranging from a fraction of a second to several seconds.

6. Micro Sound particles on a time scale that extends down to the threshold of auditory perception (measured in thousandths of a second or milli-seconds).

7. Sample The atomic level of digital audio systems: individual binary samples or numerical amplitude values, one following another at a fixed time interval. The period between samples is measured in millionths of a second (microseconds).

8. Subsample Fluctuations on a time scale too brief to be properly recorded or perceived, measured in billionths of a second (nanoseconds) or less.

9. Infinitesimal The ideal time span of mathematical durations such as the infinitely brief delta functions."

=== Trevor Wishart ===
English composer Trevor Wishart derives his own version of sound object from Schaeffer's, but unlike Schaeffer Wishart favours a materialist or physicalist notion, saying:

Given that we have established a coherent aural image of a real acoustic space, we may then begin to position sound-objects within the space. Imagine for a moment that we have established the acoustic space of a forest (width represented by the spread across a pair of stereo speakers, depth represented by decreasing amplitude and high-frequency components and increasing reverberation) then position the sounds of various birds and animals within this space.

=== Denis Smalley ===
Denis Smalley, inspired by Schaeffer's theories, developed 'spectromorphology’ (Smalley, 1997) as tool for analysing sound materials, he states:

"I have developed the concepts and terminology of spectromorphology as tools for describing and analysing listening experience… A spectromorphological approach sets out spectral and morphological models and processes, and provides a framework for understanding structural relations and behaviours as experienced in the temporal flux of the music."

An important aspect of spectromorphology is, what Smalley calls ‘source bonding’, which he describes as the duality of any given listening situation. According to Smalley sound objects have an extrinsic nature if its source bonding remains intact, but if not, it has a sonic characteristic that is intrinsic in nature. The condition in which a sound object has an intrinsic or extrinsic source bonding depends on the experiences of the listener.
