= Afroasiatic languages =

Large language family of Africa and West Asia

Afroasiatic
- Afro-Asiatic, Afrasian, Hamito-Semitic, Semito-Hamitic
- Geographic distribution: North Africa, West Asia, Horn of Africa, Sahel, and Malta
- Native speakers: 630 million
- Linguistic classification: One of the world's primary language families
- Proto-language: Proto-Afroasiatic
- Subdivisions: Berber; Chadic; Cushitic; Egyptian †; Omotic; Semitic

Language codes
- ISO 639-2 / 5: afa
- Glottolog: afro1255
- Modern distribution of the Afroasiatic languages

The Afroasiatic languages (also known as the Afro-Asiatic, Afrasian, Hamito-Semitic, or Semito-Hamitic languages) are a language family (or phylum) of about 400 languages spoken predominantly in West Asia, North Africa, the Horn of Africa, and parts of the Sahara and Sahel. Over 500 million people are native speakers of an Afroasiatic language, constituting the fourth-largest language family after Indo-European, Sino-Tibetan, and Niger–Congo. Most linguists divide the family into six branches: Berber, Chadic, Cushitic, Egyptian, Omotic, and Semitic. The vast majority of Afroasiatic languages are considered indigenous to the African continent, including all those not belonging to the Semitic branch (which originated in West Asia).

The five most spoken languages in the family are: Arabic (of all varieties), which is by far the most widely spoken within the family, with estimates of the number of native speakers ranging between 300 and 411 million, concentrated primarily in West Asia and North Africa; the Chadic Hausa language, with over 58 million speakers in West Africa; the Cushitic Oromo language, with 45 million native speakers; the Semitic Amharic language, with an estimated 25–35 million; and the Cushitic Somali language with 24 million, all the latter three in the Horn of Africa. Other Afroasiatic languages with millions of native speakers include the Semitic Tigrinya, Tigre and Modern Hebrew, the Cushitic Beja, Sidama and Afar languages, the Berber languages (Shilha, Kabyle, Central Atlas Tamazight, Shawiya and Tarifit), and the Omotic Wolaitta language. Most languages of the non-Semitic branches (especially Chadic and Omotic) have far fewer speakers, and many Afroasiatic languages in Africa are vulnerable or endangered.

There are many well-attested Afroasiatic languages from antiquity that have since died or gone extinct, including Egyptian and the Semitic languages Akkadian, Biblical Hebrew, Phoenician, Amorite, and Ugaritic. There is no consensus among historical linguists as to precisely where or when the common ancestor of all Afroasiatic languages, known as Proto-Afroasiatic, was originally spoken. However, most agree that the Afroasiatic homeland was located somewhere in Eastern North Africa or Northern East Africa, with specific proposals including the Horn of Africa, Egypt, and the eastern Sahara. A significant minority of scholars argues for an origin in the Levant. Even the latest plausible dating for its proto-language makes Afroasiatic the oldest language family accepted by contemporary linguists. Reconstructed timelines of when Proto-Afroasiatic was spoken vary extensively, with dates ranging from 18,000 BC to 8,000 BC.

Comparative study of Afroasiatic is hindered by the massive disparities in textual attestation between its branches: while the Semitic and Egyptian branches are attested in writing as early as the fourth millennium BC, Berber, Cushitic, and Omotic languages were often not recorded until the 19th or 20th centuries. While systematic sound laws have not yet been established to explain the relationships between the various branches of Afroasiatic, the languages share a number of common features. One of the most important for establishing membership in the branch is a common set of pronouns. Other widely shared features include a prefix m- which creates nouns from verbs, evidence for alternations between the vowel "a" and a high vowel in the forms of the verb, similar methods of marking gender and plurality, and some details of phonology such as the presence of pharyngeal fricatives. Other features found in multiple branches include a specialized verb conjugation using suffixes (Egyptian, Semitic, Berber), a specialized verb conjugation using prefixes (Semitic, Berber, Cushitic), verbal prefixes deriving middle (t-), causative (s-), and passive (m-) verb forms (Semitic, Berber, Egyptian, Cushitic), and a suffix used to derive adjectives (Egyptian, Semitic).

== Name ==
In current scholarship, the most common names for the family are Afroasiatic (or Afro-Asiatic), Hamito-Semitic, and Semito-Hamitic. Other proposed names that have yet to find widespread acceptance include Erythraic/Erythraean, Lisramic, Noahitic, and Lamekhite.

Friedrich Müller introduced the term Hamito-Semitic to describe the family in his Grundriss der Sprachwissenschaft (1876). The variant Semito-Hamitic is mostly used in older Russian sources. The elements of the name were derived from the names of two sons of Noah as attested in the Book of Genesis's Generations of Noah: "Semitic" from the first-born Shem, and "Hamitic" from the second-born Ham (Genesis 5:32). Within the Table of Nations, each of Noah's sons is presented as the common progenitor of various people groups deemed to be closely related: among others Shem was the father of the Jews, Assyrians, and Arameans, while Ham was the father of the Egyptians and Cushites. This genealogy does not reflect the actual origins of these peoples' languages: for example, the Canaanites are descendants of Ham according to the Table, even though Hebrew is now classified as one of the Canaanite languages, while the Elamites are ascribed to Shem, despite the Elamite language being a language isolate.

The term Semitic for the Semitic languages was coined in 1781 by August Ludwig von Schlözer, following an earlier suggestion by Gottfried Wilhelm Leibniz in 1710. Hamitic was first used by Ernest Renan in 1855 to refer to languages that appeared similar to the Semitic languages, but were not themselves provably a part of the family. The belief in a connection between Africans and the Biblical Ham, which had existed at least as far back as Isidore of Seville in the 6th century, led scholars in the early 19th century to speak vaguely of "Hamian" or "Hamitish" languages.

The term Hamito-Semitic has largely fallen out of favor among linguists writing in English, but is still frequently used in the scholarship of various other languages, such as German. Several issues with the label Hamito-Semitic have led many scholars to abandon the term and criticize its continued use. One common objection is that the Hamitic component inaccurately suggests that a monophyletic "Hamitic" branch exists alongside Semitic. In addition, Joseph Greenberg has argued that Hamitic possesses racial connotation, and that "Hamito-Semitic" overstates the centrality of the Semitic languages within the family. By contrast, Victor Porkhomovsky suggests that the label is simply an inherited convention, and does not imply a duality of Semitic and "Hamitic" any more than Indo-European implies a duality of Indic and "European". Because of its use by several important scholars and in the titles of significant works of scholarship, the total replacement of Hamito-Semitic is difficult.

While Greenberg ultimately popularized the name "Afroasiatic" in 1960, it appears to have been coined originally by Maurice Delafosse, as French afroasiatique, in 1914. The name refers to the fact that it is the only major language family with large populations in both Africa and Asia. Due to concerns that "Afroasiatic" could imply the inclusion of all languages spoken across Africa and Asia, the name "Afrasian" (Russian: афрази́йский, romanized: afrazijskije) was proposed by Igor Diakonoff in 1980. At present it predominantly sees use among Russian scholars.

The names Lisramic—based on the Afroasiatic root *lis- ("tongue") and the Egyptian word rmṯ ("person")—and Erythraean—referring to the core area around which the languages are spoken, the Red Sea—have also been proposed.

== Distribution and branches ==
A diagram of the six widely recognized branches of the Afroasiatic family, including some of the larger or more culturally significant languages in each branch.

Scholars generally consider Afroasiatic to have between five and eight branches. The five that are universally agreed upon are Berber (also called "Libyco-Berber"), Chadic, Cushitic, Egyptian, and Semitic. Most specialists consider the Omotic languages to constitute a sixth branch. Due to the presumed distance of relationship between the various branches, many scholars prefer to refer to Afroasiatic as a "linguistic phylum" rather than a "language family".

M. Victoria Almansa-Villatoro and Silvia Štubňová Nigrelli write that there are about 400 languages in Afroasiatic; Ethnologue lists 375 languages. Many scholars estimate fewer languages; exact numbers vary depending on the definitions of "language" and "dialect".

=== Berber ===
The Berber (or Libyco-Berber) languages are spoken today by perhaps 16 million people. They are often considered to constitute a single language with multiple dialects. Other scholars, however, argue that they are a group of around twelve languages, about as different from each other as the Romance or Germanic languages. In the past, Berber languages were spoken throughout North Africa except in Egypt; since the 7th century CE, however, they have been heavily affected by Arabic and have been replaced by it in many places.

Two extinct languages are potentially related to modern Berber. The first is the Numidian language, represented by over a thousand short inscriptions in the Libyco-Berber alphabet, found throughout North Africa and dating from the 2nd century BCE onward. The second is the Guanche language, which was formerly spoken on the Canary Islands and went extinct in the 17th century CE.

The first longer written examples of modern Berber varieties date only from the 16th or 17th centuries CE.

=== Chadic ===
Chadic languages number between 150 and 190, making Chadic the largest family in Afroasiatic by number of extant languages. The Chadic languages are typically divided into three major branches, East Chadic, Central Chadic, and West Chadic. Most Chadic languages are located in the Chad Basin, with the exception of Hausa. Hausa is the largest Chadic language by native speakers, and is spoken by a large number of people as a lingua franca in Northern Nigeria. It may have as many as 80 to 100 million first- and second-language speakers. Eight other Chadic languages have around 100,000 speakers; other Chadic languages often have few speakers and may be in danger of extinction. Only about 40 Chadic languages have been fully described by linguists.

=== Cushitic ===
There are about 30 Cushitic languages, more if Omotic is included, spoken around the Horn of Africa, and in Sudan and Tanzania. The Cushitic family is traditionally split into four branches: the single language of Beja (c. 3 million speakers), the Agaw languages, Eastern Cushitic, and Southern Cushitic. Only one Cushitic language, Oromo, has more than 25 million speakers; other languages with more than a million speakers include Somali, Afar, Hadiyya, and Sidaama. Many Cushitic languages have relatively few speakers. Cushitic does not appear to be related to the written ancient languages known from its area, Meroitic or Old Nubian. The oldest text in a Cushitic language probably dates from around 1770; written orthographies were developed for a select number of Cushitic languages only in the early 20th century.

=== Egyptian ===
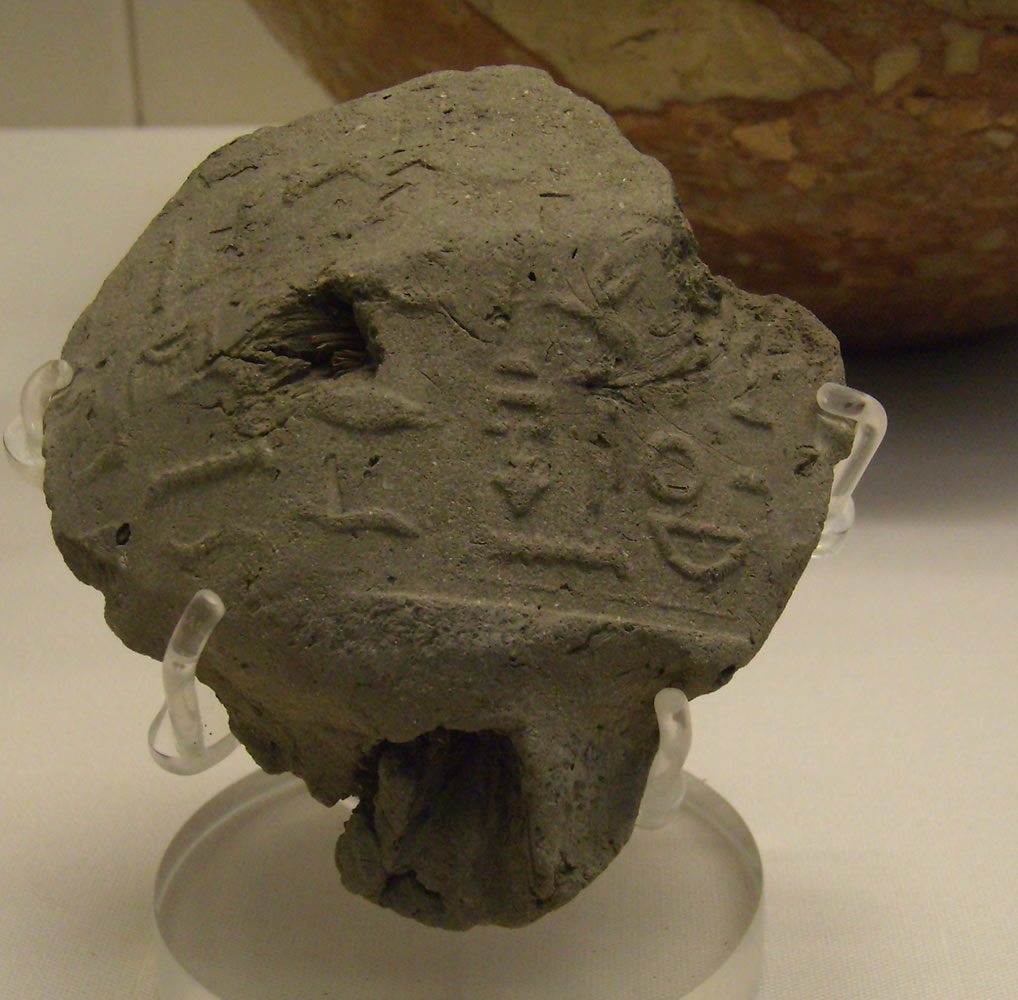
Seal impression from the tomb of Seth-Peribsen (c. 2690 BCE), containing the first complete sentence in Ancient Egyptian.

The Egyptian branch consists of the stages and dialects of a single language, Egyptian (often called "Ancient Egyptian"), which was historically spoken in the lower Nile Valley. Egyptian is first attested in writing around 3000 BCE and finally went extinct around 1300 CE, making it the language with the longest written history in the world. Egyptian is usually divided into two major periods, Earlier Egyptian (c. 3000 – 1300 BCE), which is further subdivided into Old Egyptian, Middle Egyptian, and Later Egyptian (1300 BCE – 1300 CE), which is further subdivided into Late Egyptian, Demotic, and Coptic.

Coptic is the only stage written alphabetically to show vowels, whereas Egyptian was previously written in Egyptian hieroglyphs, which represent only consonants. In the Coptic period, there is evidence for six major dialects, which presumably existed previously, but are obscured by pre-Coptic writing; additionally, Middle Egyptian appears to be based on a different dialect than Old Egyptian, which in turn shows dialectal similarities to Late Egyptian. Egyptian was replaced by Arabic as the spoken language of Egypt, but Coptic continues to be the liturgical language of the Coptic Orthodox Church.

=== Omotic ===
The c. 30 Omotic languages are still mostly undescribed by linguists. They are all spoken in southwest Ethiopia except for the Ganza language, spoken in Sudan. Omotic is typically split into North Omotic (or Damotic) and South Omotic (or Aroid), with the latter more influenced by the Nilotic languages; it is unclear whether the Dizoid group of Omotic languages belongs to the Northern or Southern group. The two Omotic languages with the most speakers are Wolaitta and Gamo-Gofa-Dawro, with about 1.2 million speakers each.

A majority of specialists consider Omotic to constitute a sixth branch of Afroasiatic. Omotic was formerly considered part of the Cushitic branch; some scholars continue to consider it part of Cushitic. Other scholars have questioned whether it is Afroasiatic at all, due to its lack of several typical aspects of Afroasiatic morphology.

=== Semitic ===
There are between 40 and 80 languages in the Semitic family. Today, Semitic languages are spoken across North Africa, West Asia, and the Horn of Africa, as well as on the island of Malta, making them the sole Afroasiatic branch with members originating outside Africa. Arabic, spoken in both Asia and Africa, is by far the most widely spoken Afroasiatic language today, with around 300-411 million native speakers, while the Ethiopian Amharic language has around 25–35 million; collectively, Semitic is the largest branch of Afroasiatic by number of current speakers.

Most authorities divide Semitic into two branches: East Semitic, which includes the extinct Akkadian language, and West Semitic, which includes Arabic, Aramaic, the Canaanite languages (including Hebrew), as well as the Ethiopian Semitic languages such as Geʽez and Amharic. The classification within West Semitic remains contested. The only group with an African origin is Ethiopian Semitic. The oldest written attestations of Semitic languages come from Mesopotamia, Northern Syria, and Egypt and date as early as c. 3000 BCE.

=== Other proposed branches ===
There are also other proposed branches, but none has so far convinced a majority of scholars:

- Linguist H. Fleming proposed that the near-extinct Ongota language is a separate branch of Afroasiatic; however, this is only one of several competing theories. About half of current scholarly hypotheses on Ongota's origins align it with Afroasiatic in some way.
- Robert Hetzron proposed that Beja is not part of Cushitic, but a separate branch. The prevailing opinion, however, is that Beja is a branch of Cushitic.
- The extinct Meroitic language has been proposed to represent a branch of Afroasiatic. Although an Afroasiatic connection is sometimes viewed as refuted, it continues to be defended by scholars such as Edward Lipiński.
- The Kujarge language is usually considered part of the Chadic languages; however, Roger Blench has proposed that it may be a separate branch of Afroasiatic.

=== Further subdivisions ===
Some proposed Afroasiatic subdivisions (Note: In this display, the universally recognized primary branches of AA are in bold. Individual languages designated as primary branches are in italics.)
Fleming 1983	Ehret 1995	Bender 1997	Diakonoff 1988	Militarev 2005
Omotic; Afroasiatic; Semitic; Old East Africa Cushitic (Note: Old East Africa Cushitic = South Cushitic and Yaaku.); Erythraic; Cushitic (Note: Fleming excludes South Cushitic, Yaaku, and Beja from Cushitic proper.); Beja; Egyptian; Berber-Chadic; Berber; Chadic	Omotic; Erythraean; Cushitic; North Erythrean; Chadic; Boreafrasian; Egyptian; Berber; Semitic	Omotic; Chadic; Central Afroasiatic; Egyptian; Macro-Cushitic; Berber; Cushitic; Semitic	East–West Afrasian; Semitic; Cushitic; Berber (Berbero-Libyan); North-South Afrasian; Egyptian; Chadic; Omotic	Cushomotic; Cushitic; Omotic; North Afrasian; Semitic; African North Afrasian; Egyptian; Chado-Berber; Chadic; Berber

There is no agreement on the relationships between and subgrouping of the different Afroasiatic branches. Whereas Marcel Cohen (1947) claimed he saw no evidence for internal subgroupings, numerous other scholars have made proposals, with Carsten Peust counting 27 as of 2012.

Common trends in proposals as of 2019 include using common or lacking grammatical features to argue that Omotic was the first language to branch off, often followed by Chadic. In contrast to scholars who argue for an early split of Chadic from Afroasiatic, scholars of the Russian school tend to argue that Chadic and Egyptian are closely related, and scholars who rely on percentage of shared lexicon often group Chadic with Berber. Three scholars who agree on an early split between Omotic and the other subbranches, but little else, are Harold Fleming (1983), Christopher Ehret (1995), and Lionel Bender (1997). In contrast, scholars relying on shared lexicon often produce a Cushitic-Omotic group. Additionally, the minority of scholars who favor an Asian origin of Afroasiatic tend to place Semitic as the first branch to split off. Disagreement on which features are innovative and which are inherited from Proto-Afroasiatic produces radically different trees, as can be seen by comparing the trees produced by Ehret and Igor Diakonoff.

Responding to the above, Tom Güldemann criticizes attempts at finding subgroupings based on common or lacking morphology by arguing that the presence or absence of morphological features is not a useful way of discerning subgroupings in Afroasiatic, because it can not be excluded that families currently lacking certain features did not have them in the past; this also means that the presence of morphological features cannot be taken as defining a subgroup. Peust notes that other factors that can obscure genetic relationships between languages include the poor state of present documentation and understanding of particular language families (historically with Egyptian, presently with Omotic). Gene Gragg likewise argues that more needs to be known about Omotic still, and that Afroasiatic linguists have still not found convincing isoglosses on which to base genetic distinctions.

One way of avoiding the problem of determining which features are original and which are inherited is to use a computational methodology such as lexicostatistics, with one of the earliest attempts by Fleming in 1983. This is also the method used by Alexander Militarev and Sergei Starostin to create a family tree. Fleming (2006) was a more recent attempt by Fleming, with a different result from Militarev and Starostin. Hezekiah Bacovcin and David Wilson argue that this methodology is invalid for discerning linguistic sub-relationship. They note the method's inability to detect various strong commonalities even between well-studied branches of AA.

=== Natufian Spread-Vector Hypothesis ===
It has been suggested that if the original Afroasiatic-speaking people did indeed originate from southern Egypt, Central Sudan and/or Ethiopia, they might have migrated up the Nile and intermingled with the Natufian population inhabiting the Levant and parts of the Sinai peninsula. This created a spread vector in and outside of Africa proper into the Levant and West Asia, and the Arabian Peninsula, which gave rise to a higher-order branch ancestral to both Cushitic and Semitic. As these populations would have "down-poured" down the coast of the Red Sea into the Arabian peninsula some crossed over into what is now Djibouti and Ethiopia, and throughout the rest of the Horn of Africa, creating yet another spread vector which became the Cushitic branch; this helps explain the seeming dialectal disconnect between other branches on the African mainland and Cushitic, sharing more affinities with the Semitic branch, which wouldn't be the case if the original Proto-Cushitic speaking populations emerged directly from the Afro-Asiatic speakers of East-Central Africa or during a backwards migration from Egypt.

On the other side of the Red Sea, the original Afroasiatic-speaking peoples would have experienced the next major schism, with some migrating further west into the Sahara (presumably during its "green period"), giving birth to a potential Berbero-Chadic branch, which again had been split twofold between its original speakers and an intermingling population of sub-Saharans. The variety spoken by those who stayed in the Northeast of the continent would become Egyptian over time.

Omotic might have been a divergent "south Cushitic" branch as originally proposed, but in the light of this hypothesis and the aforementioned dialectal disconnect Omotic may have originated from peoples who migrated backwards up the (blue) Nile into Ethiopia before or after the initial Berbero-Chadic split thus potentially creating two branches – Omotic-Egyptian and Berbero-Chadic or Omotic and Berbero-Chadic-Egyptian.

=== Official status ===
Language	Branch	Official status per country
Berber	Berber	Algeria, Morocco
Hausa	Chadic	Niger, Nigeria (national)
Afar	Cushitic	Ethiopia, Djibouti (national)
Oromo	Cushitic	Ethiopia
Somali	Cushitic	Somalia, Ethiopia, Djibouti (national)
Amharic	Semitic	Ethiopia
Arabic	Semitic	Algeria, Bahrain, Comoros, Chad, Djibouti, Egypt, Eritrea, Iraq, Jordan, Kuwait, Lebanon, Libya, Mali, Mauritania, Morocco, Oman, Palestine, Qatar, Saudi Arabia, Somalia, Sudan, Syria, Tunisia, UAE, Yemen, Israel (special status)
Hebrew	Semitic	Israel
Maltese	Semitic	Malta
Tigrinya	Semitic	Ethiopia, Eritrea (national)

== Classification history ==
A relationship between Hebrew, Arabic, and Aramaic and the Berber languages was perceived as early as the 9th century CE by the Hebrew grammarian and physician Judah ibn Quraysh, who is regarded as a forerunner of Afroasiatic studies. The French orientalist Guillaume Postel had also pointed out similarities between Hebrew, Arabic, and Aramaic in 1538, and Hiob Ludolf noted similarities also to Geʽez and Amharic in 1701. This family was formally described and named "Semitic" by August Ludwig von Schlözer in 1781. In 1844, Theodor Benfey first described the relationship between Semitic and the Egyptian language and connected both to the Berber and the Cushitic languages (which he called "Ethiopic"). In the same year T.N. Newman suggested a relationship between Semitic and the Hausa language, an idea that was taken up by early scholars of Afroasiatic. In 1855, Ernst Renan named these languages, related to Semitic but not Semitic, "Hamitic", in 1860 Carl Lottner proposed that they belonged to a single language family, and in 1876 Friedrich Müller first described them as a "Hamito-Semitic" language family. Müller assumed that there existed a distinct "Hamitic" branch of the family that consisted of Egyptian, Berber, and Cushitic. He did not include the Chadic languages, though contemporary Egyptologist Karl Richard Lepsius argued for the relation of Hausa to the Berber languages. Some scholars would continue to regard Hausa as related to the other Afroasiatic languages, but the idea was controversial: many scholars refused to admit that the largely unwritten, "Negroid" Chadic languages were in the same family as the "Caucasian" ancient civilizations of the Egyptians and Semites.

Distribution of ethnic groups in Africa (Afroasiatic/Hamito-Semitic-speaking in yellow)

An important development in the history of Afroasiatic scholarship – and the history of African linguistics – was the creation of the "Hamitic theory" or "Hamitic hypothesis" by Lepsius, fellow Egyptologist Christian Bunsen, and linguist Christian Bleek. This theory connected the "Hamites", the originators of Hamitic languages, with (supposedly culturally superior) "Caucasians", who were assumed to have migrated into Africa and intermixed with indigenous "Negroid" Africans in ancient times. The "Hamitic theory" would serve as the basis for Carl Meinhof's highly influential classification of African languages in his 1912 book Die Sprache der Hamiten. On one hand, the "Hamitic" classification was justified partially based on linguistic features: for example, Meinhof split the presently-understood Chadic family into "Hamito-Chadic", and an unrelated non-Hamitic "Chadic" based on which languages possessed grammatical gender. On the other hand, the classification also relied on non-linguistic anthropological and culturally contingent features, such as skin color, hair type, and lifestyle. Ultimately, Meinhof's classification of Hamitic proved to include languages from every presently-recognized language family within Africa.

The first scholar to question the existence of "Hamitic languages" was Marcel Cohen in 1924, with skepticism also expressed by A. Klingenheben and Dietrich Westermann during the 1920s and '30s. However, Meinhof's "Hamitic" classification remained prevalent throughout the early 20th century until it was definitively disproven by Joseph Greenberg in the 1940s, based on racial and anthropological data. Instead, Greenberg proposed an Afroasiatic family consisting of five branches: Berber, Chadic, Cushitic, Egyptian, and Semitic. Reluctance among some scholars to recognize Chadic as a branch of Afroasiatic persisted as late as the 1980s. In 1969, Harold Fleming proposed that a group of languages classified by Greenberg as Cushitic were in fact their own independent "Omotic" branch—a proposal that has been widely, if not universally, accepted. These six branches now constitute an academic consensus on the genetic structure of the family.

Greenberg relied on his own method of mass comparison of vocabulary items rather than the comparative method of demonstrating regular sound correspondences to establish the family. An alternative classification, based on the pronominal and conjugation systems, was proposed by A.N. Tucker in 1967. As of 2023, widely accepted sound correspondences between the different branches have not yet been firmly established. Nevertheless, morphological traits attributable to the proto-language and the establishment of cognates throughout the family have confirmed its genetic validity.

== Origin ==
=== Timeline ===
There is no consensus as to when Proto-Afroasiatic was spoken. The absolute latest date for when Proto-Afroasiatic could have been extant is c. 4000 BCE, after which the existence of the clearly distinct Egyptian and the Semitic languages is firmly attested. However, in all likelihood these languages began to diverge well before this hard boundary. The estimations offered by scholars as to when Proto-Afroasiatic was spoken vary widely, ranging from 18,000 BCE to 8,000 BCE. An estimate at the youngest end of this range still makes Afroasiatic the oldest proven language family. Contrasting proposals of an early emergence, Tom Güldemann has argued that less time may have been required for the divergence than is usually assumed, as it is possible for a language to rapidly restructure due to areal contact, with the evolution of Chadic (and likely also Omotic) serving as pertinent examples.

=== Location ===
Likewise, no consensus exists as to where proto-Afroasiatic originated. Scholars have proposed locations for the Afroasiatic homeland across Africa and West Asia. Roger Blench writes that the debate possesses "a strong ideological flavor", with associations between an Asian origin and "high civilization". An additional complicating factor is the lack of agreement on the subgroupings of Afroasiatic (see Further subdivisions) – this makes associating archaeological evidence with the spread of Afroasiatic particularly difficult. Nevertheless, there is a long-accepted link between the speakers of Proto-Southern Cushitic languages and the East African Savanna Pastoral Neolithic (5,000 years ago), and archaeological evidence associates the Proto-Cushitic speakers with economic transformations in the Sahara dating c. 8,500 years ago, as well as the speakers of the Proto-Zenati variety of the Berber languages with an expansion across the Maghreb in the 5th century CE.

An origin somewhere on the African continent has broad scholarly support, and is seen as being well-supported by the linguistic data. Most scholars more narrowly place the homeland near the geographic center of its present distribution, "in the southeastern Sahara or adjacent Horn of Africa". The Afroasiatic languages spoken in Africa are not more closely related to each other than they are to Semitic, as one would expect if only Semitic had remained in a West Asian homeland while all other branches had spread from there. Likewise, all Semitic languages are fairly similar to each other, whereas the African branches of Afroasiatic are very diverse; this suggests the rapid spread of Semitic out of Africa. Proponents of an origin of Afroasiatic within Africa assume the proto-language to have been spoken by pre-Neolithic hunter-gatherers, arguing that there is no evidence of words in Proto-Afroasiatic related to agriculture or animal husbandry. Christopher Ehret, S.O. Y. Keita, and Paul Newman also argue that archaeology does not support a spread of migrating farmers into Africa, but rather a gradual incorporation of animal husbandry into indigenous foraging cultures. Ehret, in a separate publication, argued that the two principles in linguistic approaches for determining the origin of languages which are the principles of fewest moves and greatest diversity had put "beyond reasonable doubt" that the language family "had originated in the Horn of Africa".

A significant minority of scholars supports an Asian origin of Afroasiatic, most of whom are specialists in Semitic or Egyptian studies. The main proponent of an Asian origin is the linguist Alexander Militarev, who argues that Proto-Afroasiatic was spoken by early agriculturalists in the Levant and subsequently spread to Africa. Militarev associates the speakers of Proto-Afroasiatic with the Levantine Post-Natufian Culture, arguing that the reconstructed lexicon of flora and fauna, as well as farming and pastoralist vocabulary indicates that Proto-AA must have been spoken in this area. Scholar Jared Diamond and archaeologist Peter Bellwood have taken up Militarev's arguments as part of their general argument that the spread of linguistic macrofamilies (such as Indo-European, Bantu, and Austro-Asiatic) can be associated with the development of agriculture; they argue that there is clear archaeological support for farming spreading from the Levant into Africa via the Nile valley.

== Phonological characteristics ==
Speech sample in Shilha (Berber branch)

Speech sample in the Semitic Neo-Aramaic language, a descendant of Old Aramaic

Speech sample in Somali (Cushitic branch)

Speech sample in Classical Arabic (Semitic branch)

Afroasiatic languages share a number of phonetic and phonological features.

=== Syllable structure ===
Egyptian, Cushitic, Berber, Omotic, and most languages in the Semitic branch require every syllable to begin with a consonant (with the exception of some grammatical prefixes). Igor Diakonoff argues that this constraint goes back to Proto-Afroasiatic. Some Chadic languages allow a syllable to begin with a vowel; however, in many Chadic languages verbs must begin with a consonant. In Cushitic and Chadic languages, a glottal stop or glottal fricative may be inserted to prevent a word from beginning with a vowel. Typically, syllables begin with only a single consonant. Diakonoff argues that proto-Afroasiatic did not have consonant clusters within a syllable.

With the exception of some Chadic languages, all Afroasiatic languages allow both open syllables (ending in a vowel) and closed syllables (ending in a consonant); many Chadic languages do not allow a syllable to end in a consonant. Most words end in a vowel in Omotic and Cushitic, making syllable-final consonant clusters rare.

Syllable weight plays an important role in Afroasiatic, especially in Chadic; it can affect the form of affixes attached to a word.

=== Consonant systems ===
Several Afroasiatic languages have large consonant inventories, and it is likely that this is inherited from proto-Afroasiatic. All Afroasiatic languages contain stops and fricatives; some branches have additional types of consonants such as affricates and lateral consonants. Afroasiatic languages tend to have pharyngeal fricative consonants, with Egyptian, Semitic, Berber, and Cushitic sharing ħ and ʕ. In all Afroasiatic languages, consonants can be bilabial, alveolar, velar, and glottal, with additional places of articulation found in some branches or languages. Additionally, the glottal stop (ʔ) usually exists as a phoneme, and there tends to be no phonemic contrast between [p] and [f] or [b] and [v]. In Cushitic, the Ethiopian Semitic language Tigrinya, and some Chadic languages, there is no underlying phoneme [p] at all.

Most, if not all branches of Afroasiatic distinguish between voiceless, voiced, and "emphatic" consonants. (Note: Some scholars reconstruct "emphatic" consonants for Egyptian and some do not.) The emphatic consonants are typically formed deeper in the throat than the others; they can be realized variously as glottalized, pharyngealized, uvularized, ejective, and/or implosive consonants in the different branches. This distinction between three manners of articulation is not generally reconstructed for continuant obstruents (such as fricatives), which are generally reconstructed as being only voiceless in Proto-Afroasiatic.

A form of long-distance consonant assimilation known as consonant harmony is attested in Berber, Chadic, Cushitic, and Semitic: it usually affects features such as pharyngealization, palatalization, and labialization. Several Omotic languages have "sibilant harmony", meaning that all sibilants (s, sh, z, ts, etc.) in a word must match.

=== Consonant incompatibility ===
Examples of root consonant incompatibilities from Egyptian, after Allen 2020a
consonant	cannot occur with
p	b, f, m, h
r	ꜣ, b
ḫ	h, ḥ, ẖ, q, k, g, ṯ, ḏ
s	ḥ, z
t	ꜥ, z, q, g, d, ḏ

Restrictions against the co-occurrence of certain, usually similar, consonants in verbal roots can be found in all Afroasiatic branches, though they are only weakly attested in Chadic and Omotic. The most widespread constraint is against two different labial consonants (other than w) occurring together in a root, a constraint which can be found in all branches but Omotic. Another widespread constraint is against two non-identical lateral obstruents, which can be found in Egyptian, Chadic, Semitic, and probably Cushitic. Such rules do not always apply for nouns, numerals, or denominal verbs, and do not affect prefixes or suffixes added to the root. Roots that may have contained sequences that were possible in Proto-Afroasiatic but are disallowed in the daughter languages are assumed to have undergone consonant dissimilation or assimilation.

A set of constraints, developed originally by Joseph Greenberg on the basis of Arabic, has been claimed to be typical for Afroasiatic languages. Greenberg divided Semitic consonants into four types: "back consonants" (glottal, pharyngeal, uvular, laryngeal, and velar consonants), "front consonants" (dental or alveolar consonants), liquid consonants, and labial consonants. He showed that, generally, any consonant from one of these groups could combine with consonants from any other group, but could not be used together with consonants from the same group. Additionally, he showed that Proto-Semitic restricted a sequence of two identical consonants in the first and second position of the triliteral root. These rules also have a number of exceptions:

1. velar consonants can occur with pharyngeals or laryngeals;
2. dental consonants can co-occur with sibilants; However, there are no Proto-Semitic verbal roots with ḍ and a sibilant, and roots with d and a sibilant are uncommon. In all attested cases of a dental and a sibilant, the sibilant occurs in first position and the dental in second.

Similar exceptions can be demonstrated for the other Afroasiatic branches that have these restrictions to their root formation. James P. Allen has demonstrated that slightly different rules apply to Egyptian: for instance, Egyptian allows two identical consonants in some roots, and disallows velars from occurring with pharyngeals.

=== Vowel systems ===
There is a large variety of vocalic systems in Afroasiatic, and attempts to reconstruct the vocalic system of Proto-Afroasiatic vary considerably. All branches of Afroasiatic have a limited number of underlying vowels (between two and seven), but the number of phonetic vowels can be much larger. The quality of the underlying vowels varies considerably by language; the most common vowel throughout Afroasiatic is schwa. In the different languages, central vowels are often inserted to break up consonant clusters (a form of epenthesis). Various Semitic, Cushitic, Berber, and Chadic languages, including Arabic, Amharic, Berber, Somali, and East Dangla, also exhibit various types of vowel harmony.

=== Tones ===
The majority of Afroasiatic languages are tonal languages: phonemic tonality is found in Omotic, Chadic, and Cushitic languages, but absent in Berber and Semitic. There is no information on whether Egyptian had tones. In contemporary Omotic, Chadic, and Cushitic languages, tone is primarily a grammatical feature: it encodes various grammatical functions, only differentiating lexical roots in a few cases. In some Chadic and some Omotic languages every syllable has to have a tone, whereas in most Cushitic languages this is not the case. Some scholars postulate that Proto-Afroasiatic may have had tone, while others believe it arose later from a pitch accent.

Examples of tones marking lexical and morphological changes in some Afroasiatic languages, after Frajzyngier 2012
Language	Examples		
Somali (Cushitic)	díbi bull, absolutive case	dibi bull, nominative case	dibí bull, genitive case
Somali (Cushitic)	ínan, boy	inán girl	
Bench (Omotic)	k'áyts' work! do it! (active imperative)	k'àyts' be done! (passive imperative)	
Hausa (Chadic)	màatáa woman, wife	máatáa women, wives	
Hausa (Chadic)	dáfàa to cook (infinitive)	dàfáa cook! (imperative)	

== Similarities in grammar, syntax, and morphology ==
At present, there is no generally accepted reconstruction of Proto-Afroasiatic grammar, syntax, or morphology, nor one for any of the sub-branches besides Egyptian. This means that it is difficult to know which features in Afroasiatic languages are retentions, and which are innovations. Moreover, all Afroasiatic languages have long been in contact with other language families and with each other, leading to the possibility of widespread borrowing both within Afroasiatic and from unrelated languages. There are nevertheless a number of commonly observed features in Afroasiatic morphology and derivation, including the use of suffixes, infixes, vowel lengthening and shortening as a morphological change, as well as the use of tone changes to indicate morphology. Further commonalities and differences are explored in more detail below.

=== General features ===
==== Consonantal root structures ====
A widely attested feature in AA languages is a consonantal structure into which various vocalic "templates" are placed. This structure is particularly visible in the verbs, and is particularly noticeable in Semitic. Besides for Semitic, vocalic templates are well attested for Cushitic and Berber, where, along with Chadic, it is less productive; it is absent in Omotic. For Egyptian, evidence for the root-and-template structure exists from Coptic. In Semitic, Egyptian, and Berber, verbs have no inherent vowels at all; the vowels found in a given stem are dependent on the vocalic template. In Chadic, verb stems can include an inherent vowel as well.

Most Semitic verbs are triliteral (have three consonants), whereas most Chadic, Omotic, and Cushitic verbs are biliteral (having two consonants). The degree to which the Proto-AA verbal root was triliteral is debated. It may have originally been mostly biconsonantal, to which various affixes (such as verbal extensions) were then added and lexicalized. Although any root could theoretically be used to create a noun or a verb, there is evidence for the existence of distinct noun and verb roots, which behave in different ways.

Examples of verbal templates in AA languages, after Gragg 2019
Language	Akkadian (Semitic)	Berber	Beja (Cushitic)	Ron/Daffo (Chadic)	Coptic (Egyptian)
Root	p-r-s to divide	k-n-f to roast	d-b-l to gather	m-(w)-t to die	k-t to build
Templates	iprus- (preterite)	ǎknəf (aorist)	-dbil- (past)	mot (perfective)	kôt (infintive)
Templates	iparras- (present)	əknǎf (perfective)	-i:-dbil- (aorist)	mwaát (imperfective)	kêt (qualitative)
Templates	iptaras (perfect)	əkǎnnǎf (imperfective)	i:-dbil- (modal)		
Templates		əknəf (neg. perfective)	da:n-bi:l (present sg)		
Templates		əkənnəf (neg. imperfective)	-e:-dbil- (present pl)		
Templates			-dabi:l- (negative)		

As part of these templates, the alternation (apophony) between high vowels (e.g. i, u) and a low vowel (a) in verbal forms is usually described as one of the main characteristics of AA languages: this change codes a variety of different functions. It is unclear whether this system is a common AA trait; the Chadic examples, for instance, show signs of originally deriving from affixes, which could explain the origins of the alterations in other languages as well.

==== Word order ====
It remains unclear what word order Proto-Afroasiatic had. Berber, Egyptian, and most Semitic languages are verb-initial languages, whereas Cushitic, Omotic and some Semitic subgroups are verb-final languages. Proto-Chadic is reconstructed as having verb-initial word order, but most Chadic languages have subject-verb-object word order.

==== Reduplication and gemination ====
Afroasiatic Languages use the processes of reduplication and gemination (which often overlap in meaning) to derive nouns, verbs, adjectives, and adverbs throughout the AA language family. Gemination in particular is one of the typical features of AA. Full or partial reduplication of the verb is often used to derive forms showing repeated action (pluractionality), though it is unclear if this is an inherited feature or has been widely borrowed.

=== Nouns ===
==== Grammatical gender and number ====
The assignment of nouns and pronouns to either masculine or feminine gender is present in all branches – but not all languages – of the Afroasiatic family. This sex-based gender system is widely agreed to derive from Proto-Afroasiatic. In most branches, gender is an inherent property of nouns. Additionally, even when nouns are not cognates, they tend to have the same gender throughout Afroasiatic ("gender stability"). In Egyptian, Semitic, and Berber, a feminine suffix -t is attested to mark feminine nouns; in some Cushitic and Chadic languages, a feminine -t suffix or prefix (lexicalized from a demonstrative) is used to mark definiteness. In addition to these uses, -t also functions as a diminutive, pejorative, and/or singulative marker in some languages.

Use of T on feminine nouns, using data from Souag 2023
Kabyle (Berber)	Hausa (Chadic)	Beja (Cushitic)	Egyptian	Arabic (Semitic)
wəl-t 'daughter'	yārinyà-r̃ 'the girl' (r̃ < final -t)	ʔo:(r)-t 'a daughter' t-ʔo:r 'the daughter'	zꜣ-t 'daughter'	bin-t 'daughter'

Afroasiatic languages have a variety of ways of marking plurals; in some branches, nouns change gender from singular to plural (gender polarity), while in others, plural forms are ungendered. In addition to marking plurals via a number of affixes (with the suffixes -*uu/-*w and -*n(a) widely attested), several AA languages make use of internal vowel change (apophony) and/or insertion (epenthesis). These so-called "internal-a" or "broken" plurals are securely attested in Semitic, Berber, Cushitic, and Chadic, although it is unclear if the Chadic examples are an independent development. (Note: As Egyptian is spelled without vowels, it is difficult to know whether it had internal change plurals. There is some evidence from Coptic, but this may be unrelated to AA. There is also some evidence from cuneiform transcriptions of Egyptian words.) Another common method of forming plurals is reduplication.

Some examples of internal plurals in AA, using data from Gragg 2019 and Meyer & Wolff 2019
Language	Meaning	Singular	Plural
Geʽez (Semitic)	king	nɨgus	nägäs-t
Tashelhiyt (Berber)	country	ta-mazir-t	ti-mizar
Afar (Cushitic)	body	galab	galo:b-a
Hausa (Chadic)	stream	gulbi	gulà:be:
Mubi (Chadic)	eye	irin	aràn

==== Noun cases and states ====
Nouns cases are found in the Semitic, Berber, Cushitic, and Omotic branches. They are not found in Chadic languages, and there is no evidence for cases in Egyptian. A common pattern in AA languages with case is for the nominative to be marked by -u or -i, and the accusative to be marked by -a. However, the number and types of cases varies across AA and also within the individual branches. Some languages in AA have a marked nominative alignment, a feature which may date back to Proto-Afroasiatic. Zygmont Frajzyngier states that a general characteristic of case marking in AA languages is that it tends to mark roles such as genitive, dative, locative, etc. rather than the subject and object.

Subject-Object case marking in some AA branches, using data in Gragg 2019, Huehnergard 2011 and Bender 2000
Case	Oromo (Cushitic)		Berber		Akkadian (Semitic)		Wolaitta (Omotic)	
Case	Masculine	Feminine	Masculine	Feminine	Masculine	Feminine	Masculine	Feminine
Nominative/bound	nam-(n)i boy	intal-t-i girl	u-frux boy	t-frux-t girl	šarr-u-m king	šarr-at-u-m queen	keett-i house	macci-yo woman
Accusative/absolutive/unbound	nam-a	intal-a	a-frux	t-a-frux-t	šarr-a-m	šarr-at-a-m	keett-a	macci-ya

A second category, which partially overlaps with case, is the AA linguistic category of "state". Linguists use the term "state" to refer to different things in different languages. In Cushitic and Semitic, nouns exist in the "free state" or the "construct state". The construct state is a special, usually reduced form of a noun, which is used when the noun is possessed by another noun (Semitic) or is modified by an adjective or relative clause (Cushitic). Edward Lipiński refers to Semitic nouns as having four states: absolute (free/indeterminate), construct, determinate, and predicate. Coptic and Egyptian grammar also refers to nouns having a "free" (absolute) state, a "construct state", and a "pronominal state". The construct state is used when a noun becomes unstressed as the first element of a compound, whereas the pronominal state is used when the noun has a suffixed possessive pronoun. Berber instead contrasts between the "free state" and the "annexed state", the latter of which is used for a variety of purposes, including for subjects placed after a verb and after certain prepositions.

Noun states in different AA branches, using data from Allen 2020, Lipiński 2001, Mous 2012, and Kossmann 2012
Language	Free/absolute state	Construct State	Additional state
Aramaic (Semitic)	malkā(h) queen	malkat	Emphatic: malkətā
Coptic (Egyptian)	jôj head	jaj-	Pronominal: jô-
Iraqw (Cushitic)	afee mouths	afé-r	–
Riffian (Berber)	a-ryaz man	–	Annexed: wə-ryaz

=== Modifiers and agreement ===
There is no strict distinction between adjectives, nouns, and adverbs in Afroasiatic. All branches of Afroasiatic have a lexical category of adjectives except for Chadic; some Chadic languages do have adjectives, however. In Berber languages, adjectives are rare and are mostly replaced by nouns of quality and stative verbs. In different languages, adjectives (and other modifiers) must either precede or follow the noun. In most AA languages, numerals precede the noun.

In those languages that have adjectives, they can take gender and number markings, which, in some cases, agree with the gender and number of the noun they are modifying. However, in Omotic, adjectives do not agree with nouns: sometimes, they take gender and number marking only when they are used as nouns, in other cases, they take gender and number marking only when they follow the noun (the noun then receives no marking).

A widespread pattern of gender and number marking in Afroasiatic, found on demonstratives, articles, adjectives, and relative markers, is a consonant N for masculine, T for feminine, and N for plural. This can be found in Semitic, Egyptian, Beja, Berber, and Chadic. A system K (masculine), T (feminine), and H (plural) can be found in Cushitic, Chadic, with masculine K also appearing in Omotic. The feminine marker T is one of the most consistent aspects across the different branches of AA.

Masculine, Feminine, Plural agreement patterns in N T N, using data from Greenberg 1960 (Note: Forms that do not follow the pattern are in parentheses.)
Language	meaning	Masculine	Feminine	Plural (Note: Some languages have an additional feminine plural form in -t that is not listed here.)
Old South Arabian (Semitic)	this	ð-n	ð-t	ʔl-n
Egyptian	this	(p-n)	t-n	n-n
Beja (Cushitic)	this	be-n	be-t	bal-īn
Tuareg (Berber)	relative verb form	ilkəm-ən	təlkəm-ət	ilkəm-ən-in
Hausa (Chadic)	possessive base	na-	ta-	na-

=== Verb forms ===
==== Tenses, aspects, and moods (TAMs) ====
There is no agreement about which tenses, aspects, or moods (TAMs) Proto-Afroasiatic might have had. Most grammars of AA posit a distinction between perfective and imperfective verbal aspects, which can be found in Cushitic, Berber, Semitic, most Chadic languages, and some Omotic languages. The Egyptian verbal system diverges greatly from that found in the other branches. Additionally, it is common in Afroasiatic languages for the present/imperfective form to be a derived (marked) form of the verb, whereas in most other languages and language families the present tense is the default form of the verb. Another common trait across the family is the use of a suppletive imperative for verbs of motion.

==== "Prefix conjugation" ====
Conjugation of verbs using prefixes that mark person, number, and gender can be found in Semitic, Berber, and in Cushitic, where it is only found on a small set of frequent verbs. These prefixes are clearly cognate across the branches, although their use within the verbal systems of the individual languages varies. There is a general pattern in which n- is used for the first person plural, whereas t- is used for all forms of the second person regardless of plurality or gender, as well as feminine singular. Prefixes of ʔ- (glottal stop) for the first person singular and y- for the third person masculine can also be reconstructed. As there is no evidence for the "prefix conjugation" in Omotic, Chadic, or Egyptian, it is unclear whether this was a Proto-Afroasiatic feature that has been lost in those branches or is a shared innovation among Semitic, Berber, and Cushitic. (Note: Traditionally, the Hausa subject pronouns have been compared to the prefix conjugation. However, since the 1970s and '80s, comparisons of other Chadic subject pronouns with the Hausa ones have convinced most scholars that the similarity to the prefix conjugation is incidental.)

The "prefix conjugation" in Afroasiatic, following Gragg 2019
Number	Person	Gender	Akkadian (Semitic)		Berber		Beja (Cushitic)		
Number	Person	Gender	Preterite	Present	Aorist	Imperfective	"Old Past"	"Old Present"	"New Present"
Singular	1		a-prus	a-parras	ăknəf-ăʕ	əkănnăf-ăʕ	ʔ-i:-dbíl	ʔ-a-dbíl	ʔ-a-danbí:l
Singular	2	m	ta-prus	ta-parras	t-ăknəf-ət	t-əkănnăf-ət	t-i:-dbíl-a	t-i-dbíl-a	danbí:l-a
Singular	2	f	ta-prus-i:	ta-parras-i	t-ăknəf-ət	t-əkănnăf-ət	t-i:-dbíl-i	t-i-dbíl-i	danbí:l-i
Singular	3	m	i-prus	i-parras	y-ăknəf	y-əkănnăf	ʔ-i:-dbíl	ʔ-i-dbíl	danbí:l
Singular	3	f	ta-prus	ta-parras	t-ăknəf	t-əkănnăf	t-i:-dbíl	t-i-dbíl	danbí:l
Plural	1		ni-prus	ni-parras	n-ăknəf	n-əkănnăf	n-i:-dbíl	n-i-dbíl	n-e:-dbíl
Plural	2	m	ta-prus-a:	a-parras	t-ăknəf-ăm	t-əkănnăf-ăm	t-i:-dbíl-na	t-i-dbíl-na	t-e:-dbíl-na
Plural	2	f	ta-prus-a:	ta-parras	t-ăknəf-măt	t-əkănnăf-măt	t-i:-dbíl-na	t-i-dbíl-na	t-e:-dbíl-na
Plural	3	m	i-prus-u:	ta-parras-i:	ăknəf-ăn	əkănnăf-ăn	ʔ-i:-dbíl	ʔ-i-dbíl	ʔ-e:-dbíl-na
Plural	3	f	i-prus-a:	i-parras	ăknəf-năt	əkănnăf-năt	ʔ-i:-dbíl	ʔ-i-dbíl	ʔ-e:-dbíl-na

==== "Suffix conjugation" ====
Some AA branches have what is called a "suffix conjugation", formed by adding pronominal suffixes to indicate person, gender, and number to a verbal adjective. In Akkadian, Egyptian, Berber, and Cushitic this forms a "stative conjugation", used to express the state or result of an action; the same endings as in Akkadian and Egyptian are also present in the West Semitic perfective verb form. In Akkadian and Egyptian, the suffixes appear to be reduced forms of the independent pronouns (see Pronouns); the obvious correspondence between the endings in the two branches has been argued to show that Egyptian and Semitic are closely related. While some scholars posit an AA origin for this form, it is possible that the Berber and Cushitic forms are independent developments, as they show significant differences from the Egyptian and Semitic forms. The Cushitic forms in particular may be derived from morphology found in subordinate clauses.

The "suffix conjugation" in Afroasiatic, following Gragg 2019
Number	Person	Gender	Akkadian (Semitic)	Egyptian	Berber	Afar (Cushitic)
Singular	1		pars-a:ku	sḏm-kw	măttit-ăʕ	miʕ-iyo-h
Singular	2	m	pars-a:ta	sḏm-tj	măttit-ət	miʕ-ito-h
Singular	2	f	pars-a:ti	sḏm-tj	măttit-ət	miʕ-ito-h
Singular	3	m	paris	sḏm-w	măttit	meʕ-e-h
Singular	3	f	pars-at	sḏm-tj	măttit-ăt	meʕ-e-h
Plural	1		pars-a:nu	sḏm-wjn	măttit-it	miʕ-ino-h
Plural	2	m	pars-a:tunu	sḏm-tjwnj	măttit-it	miʕ-ito:nu-h
Plural	2	f	pars-a:tina	sḏm-tjwnj	măttit-it	miʕ-ito:nu-h
Plural	3	m	pars-u:	sḏm-wj	măttit-it	moʕ-o:nu-h
Plural	3	f	pars-a:	sḏm-wj	măttit-it	moʕ-o:nu-h

=== Common derivational affixes ===
==== M-prefix noun derivation ====
A prefix in m- is the most widely attested affix in AA that is used to derive nouns, and is one of the features Joseph Greenberg used to diagnose membership in the family. It forms agent nouns, place nouns, and instrument nouns. In some branches, it can also derive abstract nouns and participles. Omotic, meanwhile, shows evidence for a non-productive prefix mV- associated with the feminine gender. Christopher Ehret has argued that this prefix is a later development that was not present in Proto-Afro-Asiatic, but rather derived from a PAA indefinite pronoun *m-. Such an etymology is rejected by A. Zaborski and Gábor Takács, the latter of whom argues for a PAA *ma- that unites all or some of the meanings in the modern languages.

Examples of m-prefix noun derivations, using data from Meyer & Wolff 2019, Beylage 2018, and Wilson 2020
Language	Root	Agent/Instrument	Place/Abstract
Egyptian	swr to drink	m-swr drinking bowl	–
Arabic (Semitic)	k-t-b to write	mu-katib-un writer	ma-ktab-un school
Hausa (Chadic)	hayf- to give birth	má-hàif-íi father	má-háif-áa birthplace
Beja (Cushitic)	firi to give birth	–	mi-frey birth
Tuareg (Berber)	äks to eat	em-äks eater	–

==== Verbal extensions ====
Many AA languages use prefixes or suffixes (verbal extensions) to encode various pieces of information about the verb. Three derivational prefixes can be reconstructed for Proto-Afroasiatic: *s- 'causative', *t- 'middle voice' or 'reflexive', and *n- 'passive'; the prefixes appear with various related meanings in the individual daughter languages and branches. Christopher Ehret has proposed that Proto-Afroasiatic originally had as many as thirty-seven separate verbal extensions, many of which then became fossilized as third consonants. This theory has been criticized by some, such as Andrzej Zaborski and Alan Kaye, as being too many extensions to be realistic, though Zygmunt Frajzyngier and Erin Shay note that some Chadic languages have as many as twelve extensions.

Common verbal extensions in Afroasiatic, using data from Wilson 2020, Bubenik 2023, and Kossmann 2007
Language	Causative *s-	Reflexive/middle *t-	Passive *n-
Akkadian (Semitic)	u-š-apris 'make cut'	mi-t-gurum 'agree (with one another)'	i-p-paris (> *i-n-paris) 'be cut'
Figuig (Berber)	ssu-fəɣ 'let out'	i-ttə-ska 'it has been built'	mmu-bḍa 'divide oneself'
Beja (Cushitic)	s-dabil 'make gather'	t-dabil 'be gathered'	m-dabaal 'gather each other'
Egyptian	s-ꜥnḫ 'make live'	pr-tj 'is sent forth' (Note: The Egyptian passive suffix is solely morphological and does not form a unique stem.)	n-hp 'escape' (Note: The Egyptian prefix has a middle voice/intransitive/or passive meaning.)

==== "Nisba" derivation ====
The so-called "Nisba" is a suffix used to derive adjectives from nouns and, in Egyptian, also from prepositions. It is found in Egyptian, Semitic, and possibly, in some relic forms, Berber. The suffix has the same basic form in Egyptian and Semitic, taking the form -i(y) in Semitic and being written -j in Egyptian. The Semitic and Cushitic genitive case in -i/-ii may be related to "nisba" adjective derivation.

"Nisba" derivation in Semitic and Egyptian, using data from Wilson 2020 and Beylage 2018
Language	Noun/preposition	Derived adjective
Hebrew (Semitic)	yārēaḥ moon	yərēḥī lunar
Egyptian	nṯr god	nṯr.j divine
Egyptian	ḥr upon	ḥr.j upper, which is upon

Due to its presence in the oldest attested and best-known AA branches, nisba derivation is often thought of as a "quintessentially Afroasiatic feature". Christopher Ehret argues for its presence in Proto-Afroasiatic and for its attestation in some form in all branches, with a shape -*ay in addition to -*iy in some cases.

== Vocabulary comparison ==
=== Pronouns ===
The forms of the pronouns are very stable throughout Afroasiatic (excluding Omotic), and they have been used as one of the chief tools for determining whether a language belongs to the family. However, there is no consensus on what the reconstructed set of Afroasiatic pronouns might have looked like. A common characteristic of AA languages is the existence of a special set of "independent" pronouns, which are distinct from subject pronouns. They can occur together with subject pronouns but cannot fulfill an object function. Also common are dependent/affix pronouns (used for direct objects and to mark possession). For most branches, the first person pronouns contain a nasal consonant (n, m), whereas the third person displays a sibilant consonant (s, sh). Other commonalities are masculine and feminine forms used in both the second and third persons, except in Cushitic and Omotic. These pronouns tend to show a masculine "u" and a feminine "i". The Omotic forms of the personal pronouns differ from the others, with only the plural forms in North Omotic appearing potentially to be cognate.

Pronouns in the Afroasiatic family, following Gragg 2019
Meaning	North Omotic (Yemsa)	Beja Cushitic (Baniamer)	East Cushitic (Somali)	West Chadic (Hausa)	East Chadic (Mubi)	Egyptian	East Semitic (Akkadian)	West Semitic (Arabic)	Berber (Tashelhiyt)
'I' (ind.)	tá	aní	aní-ga	ni:	ndé	jnk	ana:ku	ʔana	nkki
'me, my' (dep.)	-ná- -tá-	-u:	-ʔe	na	ní	-j wj	-i: -ya	-i: -ni:	-i
'we' (ind.)	ìnno	hinín	anná-ga inná-ga	mu:	ána éné	jnn	ni:nu:	naħnu	nkkwni
'you' (masc. sing. ind.)	né	barú:k	adí-ga	kai	kám	nt-k	at-ta	ʔan-ta	kiji
'you' (fem. sing. ind.)	né	batú:k	adí-ga	ke:	kín	nt-ṯ	at-ti	ʔan-ti	kmmi (f)
'you' (masc. sing., dep.)	-né-	-ú:k(a)	ku	ka	ká	-k	-ka	-ka	-k
'you' (fem. sing., dep.)	-né-	-ú:k(i)	ku	ki	kí	-ṯ	-ki	-ki	-m
'you' (plural, dep.)	-nitì-	-ú:kna	idin	ku	ká(n)	-ṯn	-kunu (m) -kina (f)	-kum (m) -kunna (f)	-un (m) -un-t (f)
'he' (ind.)	bár	barú:s	isá-ga	ši:	ár	nt-f	šu	huwa	ntta (m)
'she' (ind.)	bár	batú:s	ijá-ga	ita	tír	nt-s	ši	hiya	ntta-t
'he' (dep.)	-bá-	-ūs	–	ši	à	-f sw	-šu	-hu	-s
'she' (dep.)	-bá-	-ūs	–	ta	dì	-s sy	-ša	-ha:	-s

=== Numerals ===
Unlike in the Indo-European or Austronesian language families, numerals in AA languages cannot be traced to a proto-system. The Cushitic and Chadic numeral systems appear to have originally been base 5. The system in Berber, Egyptian, and Semitic, however, has independent words for the numbers 6–9. Thus, it is possible that the numerals in Egyptian, Berber, and Semitic are more closely related, whereas the Cushitic and Chadic numerals are more closely related to each other. Modern Chadic numeral systems are sometimes decimal, having separate names for the numbers 1–10, and sometimes base-5, deriving the numbers 6–9 from the numbers 1–5 in some way. Some families show more than one word for a numeral: Chadic, Semitic, and Berber each have two words for two, and Semitic has four words for one. Andrzej Zaborski further notes that the numbers "one", "two", and "five" are particularly susceptible to replacement by new words, with "five" often based on a word meaning "hand".

Another factor making comparisons of AA numeral systems difficult is the possibility of borrowing. Only some Berber languages maintain the native Berber numeral system, with many using Arabic loans for higher numbers and some from any numeral beyond two. In some Berber languages, the roots for one and two are also borrowed from Arabic. Some South Cushitic numerals are borrowed from Nilotic languages, other Cushitic numerals have been borrowed from Ethiopian Semitic languages.

Numerals from throughout Afroasiatic, using data from Blažek 2017, Blažek 2018, Lipiński 2001, and Frajzyngier & Shay 2012a
Meaning		Egyptian	Tuareg (Berber)	Akkadian (East Semitic)	Arabic (West Semitic)	Beja (North Cushitic)	West Central Oromo (Cushitic)	Lele (East Chadic)	Gidar (Central Chadic)	Bench (North Omotic)
One	m.	wꜥ	yiwən, yan, iğ	ištēn	wāḥid	gáal	tokko	pínà	tákà	mat'
One	f.	wꜥ.t	yiwət, išt	ištiāt	wāḥida	gáat	tokko	pínà	tákà	mat'
Two	m.	sn.wj	sin, sən	šinā	ʔiṯnāni	máloob	lama	sò	súlà	nam
Two	f.	sn.tj	snat, sənt	šittā	ʔiṯnatāni	máloot	lama	sò	súlà	nam
Three	m.	ḫmt.w	ḵraḍ, šaṛḍ	šalāšat	ṯalāṯa	mháy	sadii	súbù	hókù	kaz
Three	f.	ḫmt.t	ḵraṭt, šaṛṭ	šalāš	ṯalāṯ	mháyt	sadii	súbù	hókù	kaz
Four	m.	(j)fd.w	kkuẓ	erbet(t)	ʔarbaʕa	faḍíg	afur	pórìn	póɗó	od
Four	f.	(j)fd.t	kkuẓt	erba	ʔarbaʕ	faḍígt	afur	pórìn	póɗó	od
Five	m.	dj.w	səmmus, afus	ḫamšat	ḫamsa	áy	šani	bày	ɬé	ut͡ʃ
Five	f.	dj.t	səmmust	ḫamiš	ḫams	áyt	šani	bày	ɬé	ut͡ʃ
Six	m	sjs.w	sḍis	šiššet	sitta	aságwir	jaha	ménéŋ	ɬré	sapm
Six	f.	sjs.t	sḍist	šiš(š)	sitt	asagwitt	jaha	ménéŋ	ɬré	sapm
Seven	m	sfḫ.w	sa	sebet(t)	sabʕa	asarámaab	tolba	mátàlíŋ	bùhúl	napm
Seven	f.	sfḫ.t	sat	seba	sabʕ	asarámaat	tolba	mátàlíŋ	bùhúl	napm
Eight	m.	ḫmn.w	tam	samānat	ṯamāniya	asúmhay	saddet	jurgù	dòdòpórò	nyartn
Eight	f.	ḫmn.t	tamt	samānē	ṯamānin	asúmhayt	saddet	jurgù	dòdòpórò	nyartn
Nine	m.	psḏ.w	tẓa	tišīt	tisʕa	aššaḍíg	sagal	célà	váyták	irstn
Nine	f.	psḏ.t	tẓat	tiše	tisʕ	aššaḍígt	sagal	célà	váyták	irstn
Ten	m.	mḏ.w	mraw	ešeret	ʕašara	támin	kuḍan	gòrò	kláù	tam
Ten	f.	mḏ.t	mrawt	ešer	ʕašr	támint	kuḍan	gòrò	kláù	tam

=== Cognates ===
Afroasiatic languages share a vocabulary of Proto-Afroasiatic origin to varying extents. Writing in 2004, John Huehnergard notes the great difficulty in establishing cognate sets across the family. Identifying cognates is difficult because the languages in question are often separated by thousands of years of development and many languages within the family have long been in contact with each other, raising the possibility of loanwords. Work is also hampered because of the poor state of documentation of many languages.

There are two etymological dictionaries of Afroasiatic, one by Christopher Ehret, and one by Vladimir Orel and Olga Stolbova, both from 1995. Both works provide highly divergent reconstructions and have been heavily criticized by other scholars. Andrzej Zaborski refers to Orel and Stolbova's reconstructions as "controversial", and Ehret's as "not acceptable to many scholars". Tom Güldemann argues that much comparative work in Afroasiatic suffers from not attempting first to reconstruct smaller units within the individual branches, but instead comparing words in the individual languages. Nevertheless, both dictionaries agree on some items and some proposed cognates are uncontroversial. Such cognates tend to rely on relatively simple sound correspondences.

Some widely recognized cognates in Afroasiatic, following Hayward 2000, Gragg 2019, and Huehnergard 2004 (Note: Many of these roots have other proposed cognates that are not included on the table.)
Meaning	Proto-Afroasiatic		Omotic	Cushitic	Chadic	Egyptian	Semitic	Berber
Meaning	Ehret 1995 (Note: A caron ˇ over a vowel indicates rising tone, and a circumflex ^ over a vowel indicates falling tone. V indicates a vowel of unknown quality. ʔ indicates a glottal stop. * indicates reconstructed forms based on comparison of related languages.)	Orel & Stolbova 1995	Omotic	Cushitic	Chadic	Egyptian	Semitic	Berber
to strike, to squeeze	–	*bak-	Gamo bak- 'strike'	Afar bak	Wandala bak 'to strike, beat'; (possibly) Hausa bùgaː 'to hit, strike	bk 'kill (with a sword)'	Arabic bkk 'to squeeze, tear'	Tuareg bakkat 'to strike, pound'
blood	*dîm- *dâm-	*dam-	Kaffa damo 'blood'; Aari zomʔi 'to bleed'	(cf. Oromo di:ma 'red')	Bolewa dom	(cf. jdmj 'red linen')	Akkadian damu 'blood'	Ghadames dəmm-ən 'blood'
food	–	*kamaʔ- / *kamay-	–	Afar okm- 'to eat'	Hausa ka:ma:ma: 'snack'; Tumak ka:m 'mush'	kmj 'food'	–	–
to be old, elder	*gâd-/gûd-	*gad-	–	Oromo gada 'age group, generation'; Burji gad-uwa 'old man'	Ngizim gad'e 'old'	–	Arabic gadd- 'grandfather, ancestor'	–
to say	*geh-	*gay-	Sheko ge 'to say'; Aari gai- 'to say'	–	Hausa gaya 'to say'	ḏwj 'to call, say'	(cf. Hebrew gʕy 'to shout')	–
tongue	*lis'- 'to lick'	*les- 'tongue'	Kaffa mi-laso 'tongue'	–	Mwaghavul liis tongue, Gisiga eles 'tongue Hausa halshe(háɽ.ʃè) 'tongue'; lashe 'to lick'	ns 'tongue'	Akkadian liša:nu 'tongue'	Kabyle iləs 'tongue'
to die	*maaw-	*mawut-	–	Rendille amut 'to die, to be ill'	Hausa mutu 'to die', Mubi ma:t 'to die'	mwt 'to die'	Hebrew mwt, 'to die' Geʽez mo:ta 'to die'	Kabyle əmmət 'to die'
to fly, to soar	*pîr-	*pir-	(cf. Yemsa fill- 'to jump'; Dime far 'to jump')	Beja fir 'to fly'	Hausa fi:ra 'to soar'; Mafa parr, perr 'bird's flight'	pꜣ 'to fly'; prj 'to soar, rise'	Ugaritic pr 'to flee'; Arabic frr 'to flee'	Ahogar fərə-t 'to fly'
name	*sǔm / *sǐm-	*süm-	–	–	Hausa su:na: 'name'; Sura sun 'name'; Ga'anda ɬim 'name'	–	Akkadian šumu 'name'	
to sour	*s'ăm-	–	Mocha č'àm- 'to be bitter'	PEC *cam- 'to rot'	*s'am 'sour'; Hausa (t)sʼáː.mí 'sour'	smj 'curds'	Arabic sumūț 'to begin to turn sour'	–
to spit	*tuf-	*tuf-	–	Beja tuf 'to spit'; Kemant təff y- 'to spit'; Somali tuf 'to spit'	Hausa tu:fa 'to spit'	tf 'to spit'	Aramaic tpp 'to spit'; Arabic tff 'to spit'	–
to rend, tear	*zaaʕ-	–	Gamo zaʔ 'to rend, split'	Dahalo ḏaaʕ- 'to rend, to tear (of an animal tearing its prey)' Kw'adza daʔ- 'to bite' (Note: Ehret's dictionary lists "Proto-South-Cushitic *daaʕ- 'to rend, tear', a root he reconstructs from the two words listed here in Ehret 1980.)	Ngizim dáar- 'to cut into long strips'		Arabic zaʕy- 'to snatch violently from, tear out'	–

Abbreviations: PEC='Proto-Eastern Cushitic'.

== See also ==
- Afroasiatic phonetic notation
- Borean languages
- Languages of Africa
- Languages of Asia
- Nostratic languages

== Works cited ==
- Allen, James P. (2013). The Ancient Egyptian Language: A Historical Study. Cambridge University Press. doi:10.1017/CBO9781139506090. ISBN 9781139506090.
- Allen, James P. (2020). Coptic: A Grammar of its Six Major Dialects. Eisenbrauns. doi:10.1515/9781646020867. ISBN 9781646020867.
- Allen, James P. (2020a). Ancient Egyptian Phonology. Cambridge University Press. doi:10.1017/9781108751827. ISBN 9781108751827. S2CID 216256704.
- Almansa-Villatoro, M. Victoria; Štubňová Nigrelli, Silvia (2023). "Comparative Afroasiatic Linguistics and the Place of Ancient Egyptian Within the Phylum". In Almansa-Villatoro, M. Victoria; Štubňová Nigrelli, Silvia (eds.). Ancient Egyptian and Afroasiatic: Rethinking the Origins. Eisenbrauns. pp. 3–18. ISBN 9781646022120.
- Amha, Azeb (2012). "Omotic". In Frajzyngier, Zygmunt; Shay, Erin (eds.). The Afroasiatic Languages. Cambridge University Press. pp. 423–504. ISBN 978-0-521-86533-3.
- Appleyard, David (2012). "Semitic-Cushitic/Omotic Relations". In Weninger, Stefan (ed.). The Semitic Languages: An International Handbook. de Gruyter Mouton. pp. 38–53. ISBN 978-3-11-018613-0.
- Bacovcin, Hezekiah Akiva; Wilson, David (2018). "A New Method for Computational Cladistics: An Afro-Asiatic Case Study". Transactions of the Philological Society. 116 (3): 410–434. doi:10.1111/1467-968X.12128.
- Bender, M. Lionel (1978). "Consonant Co-Occurrence Restrictions in Afroasiatic Verb Roots". In Fronzaroli, Pelio (ed.). Atti del secondo Congresso internazionale di linguistica camito-semitica: Firenze, 16-19 aprile 1974. Istituto di linguistica e di lingue orientale, Università di Firenze. pp. 9–19.
- Bender, M. Lionel (1997). "Upside-Down Afrasian". Afrikanistische Arbeitspapiere. 50. Kölner Institut für Afrikanistik: 19–34.
- Bender, M. Lionel (2000). Comparative Morphology of the Omotic Languages. Lincoln Europea.
- Beylage, Peter (2018). Middle Egyptian. Eisenbrauns. doi:10.1515/9781646022021. ISBN 9781646022021.
- Blažek, Václav (2013). "Levant and North Africa: Afroasiatic linguistic history". In Ness, Immanuel (ed.). The Encyclopedia of Global Human Migration. Blackwell. pp. 1–8. doi:10.1002/9781444351071.wbeghm815. ISBN 9781444334890.
- Blažek, Václav (2017). "Omotic Numerals". Folia Orientalia. 54: 63–86.
- Blažek, Václav (2018). "Cushitic Numerals". Folia Orientalia. 55: 33–60. doi:10.24425/for.2018.124678.
- Blench, Roger (2006). Archaeology, Language, and the African Past. Oxford, UK: Rowman & Littlefield Publishers, Inc. ISBN 978-0-7591-0466-2.
- Blench, Roger (2008). Links between Cushitic, Omotic, Chadic and the position of Kujarge (PDF). 5th International Conference of Cushitic and Omotic languages. Archived from the original (PDF) on 9 October 2022.
- Bubenik, Vit (2023). "Reconstructing the Proto-Semitic Nominal and Verbal Systems in the Context of Afroasiatic Languages". In Almansa-Villatoro, M. Victoria; Štubňová Nigrelli, Silvia (eds.). Ancient Egyptian and Afroasiatic: Rethinking the Origins. Eisenbrauns. pp. 223–254. ISBN 9781646022120.
- Diakonoff, Igor M. (1988). Afrasian Languages. Nauka.
- Diamond, J; Bellwood, P (April 2003). "Farmers and Their Languages: The First Expansions". Science. 300 (5619): 597–603. Bibcode:2003Sci...300..597D. doi:10.1126/science.1078208. ISSN 0036-8075. PMID 12714734. S2CID 13350469.
- Dimmendaal, Gerrit J. (2008). "Language Ecology and Linguistic Diversity on the African Continent". Language and Linguistics Compass. 2 (5): 840–858. doi:10.1111/j.1749-818X.2008.00085.x. ISSN 1749-818X.
- Eberhard, David M.; Simons, Gary F.; Fennig, Charles D., eds. (2021). "Ethnologue: Languages of the World". Ethnologue. Dallas, Texas: SIL International.
- Edzard, Lutz E. (1992). "The Obligatory Contour Principle and Dissimilation in Afroasiatic". Journal of Afroasiatic Languages. 3: 151–171.
- Ehret, Christopher (1980). The Historical Reconstruction of Southern Cushitic Phonology and Vocabulary. Dietrich Reimer.
- Ehret, Christopher (1995). Reconstructing Proto-Afroasiatic (Proto-Afrasian): Vowels, Tone, Consonants, and Vocabulary. University of California Press. ISBN 0-520-09799-8.
- Ehret, Christopher; Keita, O. Y.; Newman, Paul (2004). "The Origins of Afroasiatic". Science. 306 (5702). American Association for the Advancement of Science: 1680. doi:10.1126/science.306.5702.1680c. hdl:2022/21062. JSTOR 3839746. PMID 15576591. S2CID 8057990.
- Ehret, Christopher; Vyas, Deven N.; Assefa, Shiferaw; Gaston, J. Lafayette; Gleason, Tiffany; Kitchen, Andrew (2023). "Ancient Egyptian's Place in the Afroasiatic Language Family". In Almansa-Villatoro, M. Victoria; Štubňová Nigrelli, Silvia (eds.). Ancient Egyptian and Afroasiatic: Rethinking the Origins. Eisenbrauns. pp. 255–277. ISBN 9781646022120.
- Fleming, Harold C. (1983). "Chadic External Relations". In Wolff, H. Ekkehard; Meyer-Bahlburg, Hilke (eds.). Studies in Chadic and Afroasiatic linguistics. Helmut Baske. pp. 17–31.
- Fleming, Harold C. (2006). Ongota: A Decisive Language in African Prehistory. Otto Harrassowitz.
- Frajzyngier, Zygmunt; Shay, Erin (2012). "Introduction". In Frajzyngier, Zygmunt; Shay, Erin (eds.). The Afroasiatic Languages. Cambridge University Press. pp. 1–17. ISBN 978-0-521-86533-3.
- Frajzyngier, Zygmunt; Shay, Erin (2012a). "Chadic". In Frajzyngier, Zygmunt; Shay, Erin (eds.). The Afroasiatic Languages. Cambridge University Press. pp. 236–341. ISBN 978-0-521-86533-3.
- Frajzyngier, Zygmunt (2012). "Typological outline of the Afroasiatic phylum". In Frajzyngier, Zygmunt; Shay, Erin (eds.). The Afroasiatic Languages. Cambridge University Press. pp. 505–624. doi:10.1002/9781119485094.ch29. ISBN 978-0-521-86533-3. S2CID 225371874.
- Frajzyngier, Zygmunt (2018). "Afroasiatic Languages". Oxford Research Encyclopedia of Linguistics. doi:10.1093/acrefore/9780199384655.013.15. ISBN 978-0-19-938465-5.
- Frajzyngier, Zygmunt; Shay, Erin (2020). "Contact and Afroasiatic Languages". In Hickey, Raymond (ed.). The Handbook of Language Contact (2 ed.). John Wiley & Sons. pp. 571–591. doi:10.1002/9781119485094.ch29. ISBN 9781119485094. S2CID 225371874.
- Gragg, Gene (2019). "Semitic and Afro-Asiatic". In Huehnergard, John; Pat-El, Na‘ama (eds.). The Semitic Languages (2 ed.). Routledge. pp. 22–48.
- Greenberg, Joseph (1960). "An Afro-Asiatic Pattern of Gender and Number Agreement". Journal of the American Oriental Society. 80 (4): 317–321. doi:10.2307/595879. JSTOR 595879.
- Greenberg, Joseph (1950a). "The Patterning of Root Morphemes in Semitic". WORD. 6 (2): 162–181. doi:10.1080/00437956.1950.11659378. S2CID 147639111.
- Güldemann, Tom (2018). "Historical linguistics and genealogical language classification in Africa". In Güldemann, Tom (ed.). The Languages and Linguistics of Africa. The World of Linguistics, Volume 11. Berlin: De Mouton Gruyter. pp. 58–444. doi:10.1515/9783110421668-002. ISBN 9783110421668. S2CID 133888593.
- Hayward, Richard J. (2000). "Afroasiatic". In Heine, Bernd; Nurse, Derek (eds.). African Languages: An Introduction. Cambridge University Press. pp. 74–98.
- Hetzron, Robert (2009). "Afroasiatic Languages". In Comrie, Bernard (ed.). The World's Major Languages (2 ed.). Routledge. pp. 545–550.
- Hodge, Carleton T. (1971). "Afroasiatic: An Overview". In Hodge, Carleton T. (ed.). Afroasiatic: A Survey. Mouton.
- Huehnergard, John (2004). "Afro-Asiatic". In Woodard, In R.D. (ed.). The Cambridge Encyclopedia of the World's Ancient Languages. Cambridge University Press. pp. 138–159.
- Huehnergard, John (2011). A Grammar of Akkadian (3 ed.). Eisenbrauns.
- Huehnergard, John (2023). "Proto-Semitic and Egyptian". In Almansa-Villatoro, M. Victoria; Štubňová Nigrelli, Silvia (eds.). Ancient Egyptian and Afroasiatic: Rethinking the Origins. Eisenbrauns. pp. 139–160. ISBN 9781646022120.
- Kaye, Alan S.; Daniels, Peter T. (1992). "Comparative Afroasiatic and General Genetic Linguistics". WORD. 43 (3): 429–458. doi:10.1080/00437956.1992.12098319.
- Kossmann, Maarten (2007). "Berber Morphology". In Kaye, Alan S. (ed.). Morphologies of Asia and Africa. Eisenbrauns. pp. 429–446. doi:10.1515/9781575065663-022. ISBN 978-1-57506-566-3.
- Kossmann, Maarten (2012). "Berber". In Frajzyngier, Zygmunt; Shay, Erin (eds.). The Afroasiatic Languages. Cambridge University Press. pp. 18–101. ISBN 978-0-521-86533-3.
- Kouwenberg, N. J. C. (2010). The Akkadian Verb and Its Semitic Background. Eisenbrauns. doi:10.1515/9781575066240. ISBN 9781575066240.
- Lipiński, Edward (2001). Semitic Languages: Outline of a Comparative Grammar. Peeters Publishers. ISBN 978-90-429-0815-4.
- Loprieno, Antonio (1995). Ancient Egyptian: A Linguistic Introduction. Cambridge: Cambridge University Press. ISBN 978-0-521-44384-5.
- Meyer, Ronny; Wolff, H. Ekkehard (2019). "Afroasiatic Linguistic Features and Typologies". In Wolff, H. Ekkehard (ed.). The Cambridge Handbook of African Linguistics. Cambridge University Press. pp. 246–325.
- Mous, Maarten (2012). "Cushitic languages". In Frajzyngier, Zygmunt; Shay, Erin (eds.). The Afroasiatic Languages. Cambridge University Press. pp. 342–422. ISBN 978-0-521-86533-3.
- Orel, Vladimir E.; Stolbova, Olga V. (1995). Hamito-Semitic Etymological Dictionary: Materials for a Reconstruction. Leiden: Brill. ISBN 90-04-10051-2.
- Militarev, Alexander (2002). "The Prehistory of a Dispersal: The Proto-Afrasian (Afroasiatic) Farming Lexicon" (PDF). In Bellwood, Peter S.; Renfrew, Colin (eds.). Examining the Farming/Language Dispersal Hypothesis. McDonald Institute for Archaeological Research.
- Militarev, Alexander (2005). "Once more about glottochronology and the comparative method: the Omotic-Afrasian case" (PDF). Orientalia et Classica VI: Aspekty Komparatistiki. 6: 339–408.
- Militarev, Alexander (2009). "Proto-Afrasian Lexicon Confirming West Asian Homeland: Pastoralism". Journal of Language Relationship. 1: 95–106.
- Nichols, Johanna (2003). "Diversity and Stability in Language". In Joseph, Brian D; Janda, Richard D. (eds.). The Handbook of Historical Linguistics. Blackwell. pp. 283–310. ISBN 0-631-19571-8.
- Peust, Carsten (2012). "On the Subgrouping of Afro-Asiatic, or: How to use an unrooted phylogenetic tree in historical linguistics". Lingua Aegyptia. 20: 221–251.
- Porkhomovsky, Victor (2020). "Afro-Asiatic Overview". In Vossen, Rainer; Dimmendaal, Gerrit J. (eds.). The Oxford Handbook of African Languages. Oxford University Press. pp. 269–274.
- Ruhlen, Merritt (1991). A Guide to the World's Languages: Classification. Stanford University Press. ISBN 9780804718943.
- Sands, Bonny (2009). "Africa's Linguistic Diversity". Language and Linguistics Compass. 3 (2): 559–580. doi:10.1111/j.1749-818x.2008.00124.x.
- Sanker, Chelsea (2023). "Data Limitations and Supplementary Methods in Placing Egyptian". In Almansa-Villatoro, M. Victoria; Štubňová Nigrelli, Silvia (eds.). Ancient Egyptian and Afroasiatic: Rethinking the Origins. Eisenbrauns. pp. 19–34. ISBN 9781646022120.
- Shay, Erin (2014). "Afroasiatic". In Lieber, Rochelle; Štekauer, Pavol (eds.). The Oxford Handbook of Derivational Morphology. Oxford University Press. pp. 573–590. doi:10.1093/oxfordhb/9780199641642.013.0032. ISBN 978-0-19-964164-2.
- Solleveld, Floris (2020). "Lepsius as a linguist: fieldwork, philology, phonetics, and 'the Hamitic hypothesis'". Language and History. 63 (3): 193–213. doi:10.1080/17597536.2020.1760066. S2CID 219971042.
- Souag, Lameen (2023). "Restructured or Archaic? The Hunt for Shared Morphological Innovation Involving Egyptian". In Almansa-Villatoro, M. Victoria; Štubňová Nigrelli, Silvia (eds.). Ancient Egyptian and Afroasiatic: Rethinking the Origins. Eisenbrauns. pp. 303–318. ISBN 9781646022120.
- Stauder, Andréas (2023). "Egyptian Morphology in Afroasiatic Perspective". In Almansa-Villatoro, M. Victoria; Štubňová Nigrelli, Silvia (eds.). Ancient Egyptian and Afroasiatic: Rethinking the Origins. Eisenbrauns. pp. 53–136. ISBN 9781646022120.
- Starostin, George (2017). "Macrofamilies and Agricultural Lexicon: Problems and Perspectives". In Robbeets, Martine; Savelyev, Alexander (eds.). Language Dispersal Beyond Farming. John Benjamins. pp. 215–233. doi:10.1075/z.215.09sta.
- Takács, Gábor (1999). Etymological Dictionary of Egyptian. Volume 1: A Phonological Introduction. Brill. ISBN 978-90-04-11538-5.
- Takács, Gábor (2008). Etymological Dictionary of Egyptian. Volume 3: m-. Brill. ISBN 978-90-47-42379-9.
- Vernet, Eulàlia (2011). "Semitic Root Incompatibilities and Historical Linguistics". Journal of Semitic Studies. 56 (1): 1–18. doi:10.1093/jss/fgq056. hdl:2445/195869.
- Wilson, David (2020). A Concatenative Analysis of Diachronic Afro-Asiatic Morphology (Thesis). University of Pennsylvania. Archived from the original on 26 May 2022.
- Winand, Jean (2023). "Afroasiatic Lexical Comparison: An Egyptologist's Point of View". In Almansa-Villatoro, M. Victoria; Štubňová Nigrelli, Silvia (eds.). Ancient Egyptian and Afroasiatic: Rethinking the Origins. Eisenbrauns. pp. 35–50. ISBN 9781646022120.
- Zaborski, Andrzej (1987). "Basic Numerals in Cushitic". In Jungraithmayr, Herrmann; Mueller, Walter W. (eds.). Proceedings of the Fourth International Hamito-Semitic Congress. John Benjamins. pp. 317–347.
- Zaborski, Andrzej (2011). "Afro-Asiatic Languages". In Edzard, Lutz; Jong, Rudolf de (eds.). Encyclopedia of Arabic Language and Linguistics (Managing Editors Online ed.). Brill. doi:10.1163/1570-6699_eall_EALL_COM_0008.
