= Vox Cycle =

The Vox Cycle

Studio album by Trevor Wishart
- Released: 1990
- Recorded: 1979–1988
- Genre: Electroacoustic music
- Length: 66:24
- Label: Virgin Classics
- Producer: Trevor Wishart

Trevor Wishart chronology
Beach Singularity & Menagerie (1979)	The Vox Cycle (1990)	Audible Design (1994)

Vox Cycle is a series of six electroacoustic compositions by Trevor Wishart. An independent movement cycle for four amplified voices, the works were composed between 1979 and 1988 and feature extended vocal techniques and the contemporary vocal composition.

Vox Cycle is focused on the relationship and the interpolation of natural sounds and human voice, the main musical interest of the composer on which he has been researching for a long time, starting from Red Bird composition released in 1978.

The poetics at the base of the work have linguistic and philosophical relevance, regarding the relationship between the creation and disintegration of man, natural developments, and failure of western culture and society. The Raw and the Cooked by Claude Lévi-Strauss influenced the composer's central idea for these compositions.

All the vocals in the movements, except Vox V which is based only on the recording of vocal sounds improvised by Wishart himself, are performed by the Electric Phoenix ensemble, using the extended vocal techniques following the scores written by the composer. The recordings of the voices in the compositions are related with animal, natural and mechanical sounds. The spectromorphological transformations of the voices and sounds are conducted through technological means, utilising quadrophonic sound for the recording.

Vox V was commissioned by IRCAM in 1981 and premiered on French Radio INA/GRM in 1987. This composition resumes the characteristics of the entire cycle in its several production steps. From the poetical point of view, this movement represents the narrative climax; from the technical point of view it is the only piece conceived to be totally acousmatic while the other pieces have been composed to be performed. Vox V is arguably the result of the research on transformations of sound that Wishart had been conducting for a long time, which led to the creation of the Sound Loom plug-in for the Composers' Desktop Project (CDP) software.

The methodology at the base of the entire work is focused on the musical space as sonorous continuum and the concept of transformation, from a spectromorphological point of view. The essential compositional device is the gesture in the sound continuum, the transformation from one sound propriety to another as from one symbol to another. Wishart is focused on the dynamic and timbral evolution within singlular musical events. In particular, regarding the interpolation between voice and other sounds, Vox V has perhaps the "classic sonic example of this process in the transformation from the voice to a swarm of bees and the return of the voice."

Finally, the work is openly dedicated to the human voice. The composer saw the versatility of the human voice as superior to any other musical instrument for sound production, and, as the composer declared, he had been using the voice since the beginning because it was easier than recording natural or urban sounds through analogue means, when new technologies were not available.

== Track listing ==
All tracks are written by Trevor Wishart.

No.	Title	Premiere	Length
1.	"Vox I" (1980–82)	Paris Biennale, 1985	7:13
2.	"Vox II" (1982–84)	Paris Biennale, 1985	13:01
3.	"Vox III" (1985–86)	Moebius Gallery, Boston	15:58
4.	"Vox IV" (1987)	Huddersfield Festival, 1987	10:38
5.	"Vox V" (1979–86)	INA/GRM Cycle Acousmatique, Radio France, 1987	6:13
6.	"Vox VI" (1988)	BBC Promenade Concerts, 1988	13:21
Total length:			66:24
