= Alexander Militarev =

Russian linguist (born 1943)

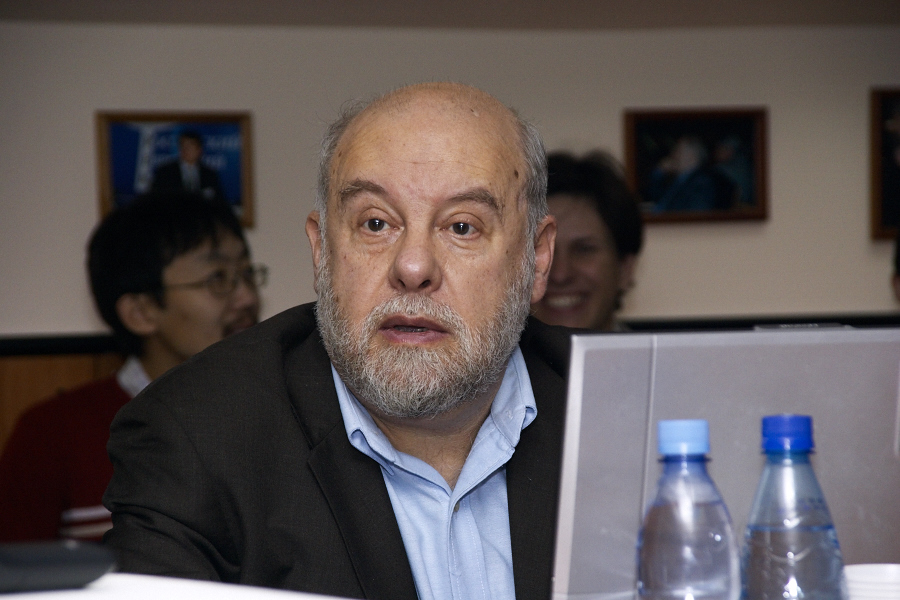
- Militarev in 2014
- Born: January 14, 1943 (age 83)
- Occupation: Linguist

Academic work
- Main interests: Afroasiatic languages, historical linguistics

Alexander Militarev (Russian: Алекса́ндр Ю́рьевич Милитарёв; born January 14, 1943) is a Russian scholar of Semitic, Berber, Canarian, and Afroasiatic (Afrasian, Semito-Hamitic) languages, comparative-historical linguistics, Jewish and Bible studies at the Russian State University for the Humanities.
