= Friedrich Müller (linguist) =

Austrian linguist and ethnologist

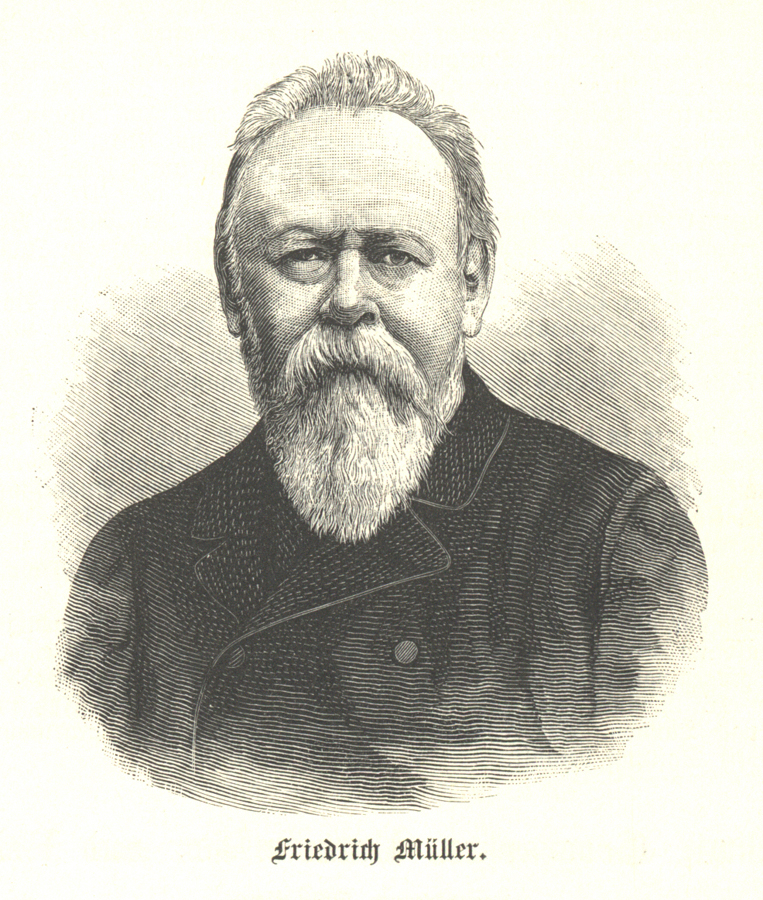
- Born: 6 March 1834; Jemnik, Austrian Empire
- Died: 25 May 1898 (aged 64); Vienna, Austria-Hungary
- Awards: Austrian Academy of Sciences

Academic background
- Education: University of Göttingen; University of Vienna

Academic work
- Discipline: Linguistics, ethnology
- Institutions: University of Vienna

Friedrich Müller (6 March 1834 – 25 May 1898) was a linguist and ethnologist who originated the term Hamito-Semitic languages for what are now called the Afro-Asiatic languages.

== Biography ==
He studied at the University of Göttingen. His studies were completed at the University of Vienna (1853–1857), where he was librarian from 1858 to 1866, and then became extraordinary and then ordinary (1869) professor of comparative philology and Sanskrit. He was a member of the Austrian Academy of Sciences, and was one of the highest authorities on comparative philology and ethnology and the relations of the two sciences, being so regarded in particular by Theodor Benfey.

== Theories ==
According to Müller's classification, followed by Robert Needham Cust, the main subgroups of the Hamito-Semitic languages are: (1) Semitic; (2) Hamitic; (3) Nuba-Fula; (4) Nigerian or Negro languages; (5) Bantu; and (6) Hottentot-Bushman.

The prominent German zoologist Ernst Haeckel mentioned Müller when he formulated his own racialist theory about higher and lower races:

The Caucasian, or Mediterranean man (Homo Mediterraneus), has from time immemorial been placed at the head of all the races of men, as the most highly developed and perfect. It is generally called the Caucasian race, but as, among all the varieties of the species, the Caucasian branch is the least important, we prefer the much more suitable appellation proposed by Friedrich Müller, namely, that of Mediterranese. For the most important varieties of this species, which are moreover the most eminent actors in what is called “Universal History,” first rose to a flourishing condition on the shores of the Mediterranean.… This species alone (with the exception of the Mongolian) has had an actual history; it alone has attained to that degree of civilization which seems to raise men above the rest of nature.

== Works ==
Besides contributing largely on comparative philology and ethnology to the Mitteilungen der anthropologischen Gesellschaft and the Wiener Zeitschrift für die Kunde des Morgenlandes, and editing these periodicals for a time, Müller wrote:

- Reise der österreichischen Fregatte Novara, linguistic and the ethnological parts (1867–73)
- Allgemeine Ethnographie (1873)
- Grundriss der Sprachwissenschaft (1876–87) Facsimile reprint, 2004 (ISBN 348712047X)
