= Trevor Wishart =

English composer

Trevor Wishart (born 11 October 1946) is an English composer, based in York. Wishart has contributed to composing with digital audio media, both fixed and interactive. He has also written extensively on the topic of what he terms "sonic art", and contributed to the design and implementation of software tools used in the creation of digital music; notably, the Composers Desktop Project.

Wishart was born in Leeds, West Riding of Yorkshire. He was educated at the University of Oxford (BA 1968), the University of Nottingham (MA 1969), and the University of York (PhD 1973). Although mainly a freelance composer, he holds an honorary position at the University of York. He was appointed as composer-in-residence at the University of Durham in 2006, and then at the University of Oxford Faculty of Music in 2010–11, supported by the Leverhulme Trust.

== Music ==
Wishart's compositional interests deal mainly with the human voice, in particular with the transformation of it and the interpolation by technological means between human voice and natural sounds. This is most evident in his albums Red Bird/Anticredos (composition period: 1973–77, publishing date: 1992) and VOX Cycle (1980–1988, 1990), and also in the compositions Tongues of Fire (1993–94, 2000), Globalalia (2003–2004, 2010), Two Women (1998, 2000), and American Triptych (1999, 2000).

He is also a solo voice performer and an improviser of extended vocal techniques, using the recordings of his own improvisations to compose his electroacoustic pieces as well, like he did for Red Bird and Vox 5.

== Writings ==
Wishart has written two books, On Sonic Art and Audible Design. On Sonic Art puts forth his theoretical and philosophical ideas, while Audible Design deals mainly with the practice and technique of composing with digital audio.

== Discography ==
As Trevor Wishart:

- Journey into Space (1973, 2xLP, not on label, mail order only)
- Journey into Space (?, cassette, Integrated Circuit Records)
- Red Bird: A Political Prisoner's Dream (1978, LP, York Electronic Studios)
- Vox Cycle (1990, CD, Virgin Classics)
- Red Bird / Anticredos (1992, CD, October Music)
- Audible Design (1994, CD, Orpheus the Pantomime)
- Tongues of Fire (1994, CD, Maxi-Single, Orpheus the Pantomime)
- Journey into Space (2002, CD, Paradigm Discs)
- Encounters in the Republic of Heaven (2011, CD, Orpheus the Pantomime)

As Trevor Wishart & Friends:

- Beach Singularity / Menagerie (1979, LP, York Electronic Studios)
- Mouth Music (1982, LP, Hyperion)
- Menagerie / Beach Singularity / Vocalise (1997, CD, Paradigm Discs)

Appears on:

- Electronic Music from York (1973, 3xLP, York Electronic Studio)
- Miniatures (1980, LP, Pipe)
- Integration (1983, cassette, ICR)
- Computer Music Currents 4 (1989, CD, WERGO)
- Electroacoustic Music and the Saxophones of Stephen Cottrell (1989, CD, Overhear Music)
- Rē Records Quarterly Volume 3 Number 1 (1989, CD, Recommended Records)
- Prix Ars Electronica 95 (1995, CD, Ars Electronica Center)
- Inventionen '98 – 50 Jahre Musique Concrète (1999, CD, Edition RZ)
- Or Some Computer Music (1999, CD, OR)
- Fümms Bö Wö Tää Zää Uu: Stimmen Und Klänge Der Lautpoesie (2002, CD, Urs Engeler Editor)
- Das Dreidimensionale Möbiusband (2003, 2XCD, Flying Swimming)
- Festival Voor Nieuwe Muziek: Happy New Ears 2005 (2005, CD, Gonzo Circus)
