= Denis Smalley =

Denis Arthur Smalley (born 1946 in Nelson, New Zealand) is a composer of electroacoustic music, with a special interest in acousmatic music.

== Biography ==
Denis Smalley studied at the University of Canterbury and Victoria University in his native New Zealand, and later at the Paris Conservatoire with Olivier Messiaen, with the Groupe de Recherches Musicales (GRM), and at the University of York.

He initially composed onto tape, but as early as the 1980s realised his works using computer software. His composition Pentes (1974) is regarded as one of the classics of electroacoustic music. Source sounds for his works may come from the environment—and are often the starting point for his pieces—but he may also develop highly sophisticated timbres from scratch using computer software. He describes his approach as "spectromorphological", featuring the development of sounds in time.

A lecturer at the University of East Anglia, England, from 1976 to 1994, he was professor of music at City University, London from 1994 until his retirement.

His music has been performed around the world and most of his major works appear on commercially released CDs.

== Recordings ==
- Impacts intérieurs (empreintes DIGITALes, IMED 0409, 2004)
- Sources/scènes (empreintes DIGITALes, IMED 0054, 2000)
- Névé (Effects Input, EI 03, 1994)
- Tides (Ode Records (New Zealand), MANU 1433, 1993)
- Impacts intérieurs (empreintes DIGITALes, IMED 9209, 1992)

== List of works ==
- Base Metals (2000)
- Berne Mobiles (1980), installation
- Clarinet Threads (1985), clarinet, and tape, received a Golden Nica (Ars Electronica, Linz, Austria) in 1988
- Darkness After Time's Colours (1976), received a Euphonie d'Or (Bourges competition) in 1992
- Empty Vessels (1997)
- Gradual (1974), amplified clarinets, and tape
- Névé (1994)
- Ouroboros (1975)
- O Vos Omnes (1986), eight-part choir, and tape
- Pentes (1974)
- Piano Nets (1990–91), piano, and tape
- Pneuma (1976, 81), amplified voices, and percussion
- The Pulses of Time (1979)
- Resounding (2004), 6-track tape
- Ringing Down the Sun (2002), 6-track tape
- Spectral Lands (2011) for electroacoustic sounds in six channels
- Tides (1984)
- Valley Flow (1991–92)
- Vortex (1982)
- Wind Chimes (1987)
