= Spectromorphology =

Spectromorphology is the perceived sonic footprint of a sound spectrum as it manifests in time. A descriptive spectromorphological analysis of sound is sometimes used in the analysis of electroacoustic music, especially acousmatic music. The term was coined by Denis Smalley in 1986 and is considered the most adequate English term to designate the field of sound research associated with the French writer, composer, and academic, Pierre Schaeffer.

Schaeffer's work at INA/GRM in Paris, beginning in the late 1940s, culminated in the publication of the book Traité des objets musicaux in 1966. Smalley's notion of spectromorphology builds upon Schaeffer's theories relating to the use of a classification system for various categories of sound.

Smalley's term refers to the descriptive analysis of perceived morphological developments in sound spectra over time, and it implies that the "spectro" cannot exist without the morphology: something has to be shaped and that something must have sonic content (Smalley, 1986, 1997).

== Theoretical framework ==
The theoretical framework of spectro-morphology is articulated mainly in four parts:

- the typology of the spectra
- morphology
- motion
- structuring processes.

=== Spectral typologies ===
Smalley defines three different spectral typologies that exist in what he calls the noise-note continuum. This continuum is subdivided into three principal elements:

- the noise.
- the node (an event having a more complex texture than a single pitch).
- the note, which is in turn subdivided into note, harmonic spectrum and inharmonic spectrum.

=== Morphological archetypes ===
Smalley also designates different morphological archetypes:

- attack-impulse. Modeled on the single detached note: a sudden onset which is immediately terminated. In this instance the attack-onset is also the termination.
- attack-decay (closed and open) - modeled on sounds in which the attack-onset is extended by a resonance that quickly or gradually decays towards termination. The closed form represents a quick decay which is strongly attack-determined. The open form reflects a more gradual decay where the ear is drawn away from the formative influence of the attack into the continuing behaviour of the sound on its way to termination.
- graduated continuant - Modeled on sustained sounds. The onset is graduated, settling into a continuant phase which eventually closes in a graduated termination. The onset is perceived as a much less formative influence than in the other two archetypes. Attention is drawn to the way in which the sound is maintained rather than to its initiation.
