= Composers Desktop Project =

Audio digital-signal processing software

The Composers Desktop Project (CDP) is an international cooperative network based in the United Kingdom that has been developing software for working with sound materials since 1986. Working on a cooperative basis and motivated by user-specific compositional needs, the project has focused on the development of precise, detailed and multifaceted DSP-based sound transformation tools. Currently, CDP provides sound transformation software (named after the project itself) for Windows and Mac OS X that has been evolving for over 20 years.

In 2014 the main components of the CDP were released as an open-source package licensed under the LGPL. Makefiles are now available for Windows, OSX, and Linux.

Originally, after a study to determine if it was possible and/or feasible to port CMusic from UNIX mainframe systems, the project released the CDP software along with corresponding SoundSTreamer hardware for the Atari ST and later ported the software to MS-DOS. The software tool-set is designed specifically to transform sound samples mostly via offline processing (non-real time); the software is considered complementary to real-time processing and audio sequencers.
