= International Confederation of Electroacoustic Music =

The International Confederation of Electroacoustic Music (ICEM), or Confédération Internationale de Musique Électroacoustique (CIME), cofounded by the Bourges International Confederation of Electroacoustic Music (IMEB, French: Institut international de musique électroacoustique de Bourges, also "Bourges International Institute of Electroacoustic Music"), formerly Groupe de musique expérimentale de Bourges, in 1981 in Bourges, is a music organization in support of electroacoustic music, including computer music.

The ICEM holds the International Electronic Music Festival and gives music awards for electroacoustic music during the former Bourges International Electro-Acoustic Music Competition (also known as "Bourges Electroacoustic Music Competition" and as the International Electro-Acoustic Music Competition, founded in 1973, "to promote elecoacoustic composition," and began to include music software as a category in 1996.

The ElectroAcoustic Music Days 2023 were held by Hellenic Electroacoustic Music Composers Association (HELMCA), in Rethymno.

== Recipients ==
- 1972: Eugeniusz Rudnik, Mobile
- 1973: Eugeniusz Rudnik, Ostinato 3rd prize
- 1976: Jack Body
- 1981: Alejandro Viñao
- 1983: Jean-Baptiste Barrière, Chréode
- 1984: Eugeniusz Rudnik, Homo Ludens 2nd prize
- 1989: Scott A. Wyatt, finalist
- 1999: Frank Corcoran, Sweeney's Vision
- 2009: Jack Body
- 2023 Prix CIME

=== Euphonie d'Or ===
Golden Sound/Sound of Gold.

- 1992: Alejandro Viñao
- 1992: Jonty Harrison, Klang
- 2002: Natasha Barrett, Utility of Space
- 2004: Jon Christopher Nelson, Scatter

=== Grand Prize ===
- 1984: Scott A. Wyatt

=== Trivium Prize ===
- 2009: Jack Body, Intimate History no. 2: ssteve

==== Finalists ====
- 2008: Natasha Barrett

=== Magisterium Prize ===
"The award is open to composers having at least 25 years of professional experience in the field, and its objective is 'the promotion and diffusion of works that might become milestones in the history of electroacoustic music'."

- 1998: Wlodzimierz Kotonski, Tierra Caliente; Jean-Claude Risset: Invisible
- 2007: Roger Doyle, Sectors 4 and 5 of The Ninth Set

== See also ==
- Hellenic Electroacoustic Music Composers Association
- Society for Electro-Acoustic Music in the United States
- Canadian Electroacoustic Community
