= Polish Radio Experimental Studio =

Experimental music studio in Warsaw

Polish Radio Experimental Studio - PRES (Polish: Studio Eksperymentalne Polskiego Radia) was an experimental music studio in Warsaw, where electronic and utility pieces were recorded. The studio was established in 1957 and operated until 2004. Composers such as Krzysztof Penderecki, Elżbieta Sikora, Włodzimierz Kotoński, and Bohdan Mazurek created in the studio.

== History ==
The Polish Radio Experimental Studio was conceived by Włodzimierz Sokorski, head of the Radio and Television Committee. Between 1952 and 1956 he was a Minister of Culture, and as a strong supporter of socialist realism he fought against any manifestations of modernity in music. The Polish Radio Experimental Studio was founded on 15 November 1957, but only in the second half of the following year was it adapted for sound production. It operated until 2004.

For 28 years, until 1985, the studio was headed by its founder, Józef Patkowski, musicologist, acoustician, and the chairman of the Polish Composers' Union. The second most important person in the Studio was Krzysztof Szlifirski, an electroacoustics engineer. Before founding the studio Józef Patkowski visited similar hubs in Cologne, Paris, Gravesono and Milan. Though the studio was a place where autonomous electronic pieces were recorded, this was not its main purpose; it was launched as a space for the creation of independent compositions, sounds illustrations for radio dramas, and soundtracks for theatre, film and dance.

== PRES and electronic music studios abroad ==
The Polish Radio Experimental Studio was often visited by cultural delegations coming to Poland. In 1951, the Studio for Electronic Music of the West German Radio (WDR) and Musique Concrète in Paris (GRMC) were established. In 1953, they were followed by Elektronisches Studio at Technische Universität Berlin. In 1954, Experimentalstudio in Gravesano, Switzerland was founded. The following year brought the opening of the Studio di fonologia musicale di Radio Milano and the Nippon Hoso Kyokai studio in Tokyo. The PRES was the seventh radio studio producing electronic music in the world.

== "The Black Room" and early equipment ==
The first machines installed to the studio were a simple tone generator, a rectangular pulse generator, an oscillograph, a high-pass and low pass RFT filters, two Sander-Jansen SJ100K tape recorders made in the German Democratic Republic, and a Polish-made mixing console with four output limiters. In the following years PRES systematically acquired new gear.

The studio's premises were located in the Polish Radio headquarters on Malczewskiego Street in Warsaw, in the 6x6 metre Black Room designed by Zofia and Oskar Hansen. The walls were made of black and red panels, soundproof on one side and sound-absorbing on the other. The Black Room was an allusion to Oskar Hansen's open form. In 1986, PRES moved across the city to the Polish Radio building on Woronicza street.

== Most important tracks ==
The first autonomous track recorded in the Experimental Studio was composed by Włodzimierz Kotoński, and titled Study for a Cymbal Stroke (Etiuda konkretna - na jedno uderzenie w talerz) from 1959. The starting point for this 2 minute 41 seconds long track was the sound of a Turkish cymbal struck by a soft drumstick. Kotoński drew from the tradition of musique concrète and Anton Webern's serialism.

Krzysztof Penderecki based his 1963 naturalistic radio play for reciter and tape Death Brigade on Leon Weliczker's diary. Wieliczker had been a prisoner in the Nazi Lviv Janowska Concentration Camp, where to cover up the German crimes he had to dig up and burn the bodies of those they had killed. The adaptation of the text comprised recordings of a heartbeat, and samples of an orchestra playing both piercing and low-frequency sounds, all of which was far from illustrative. Eugeniusz Rudnik commented on it: "The greatness of Penderecki was us not getting carried away by naturalism. We didn't represent skulls breaking in the flames. [...] Instead, we did a subtle, smart and delicate multiplication of the actor's lines ..."

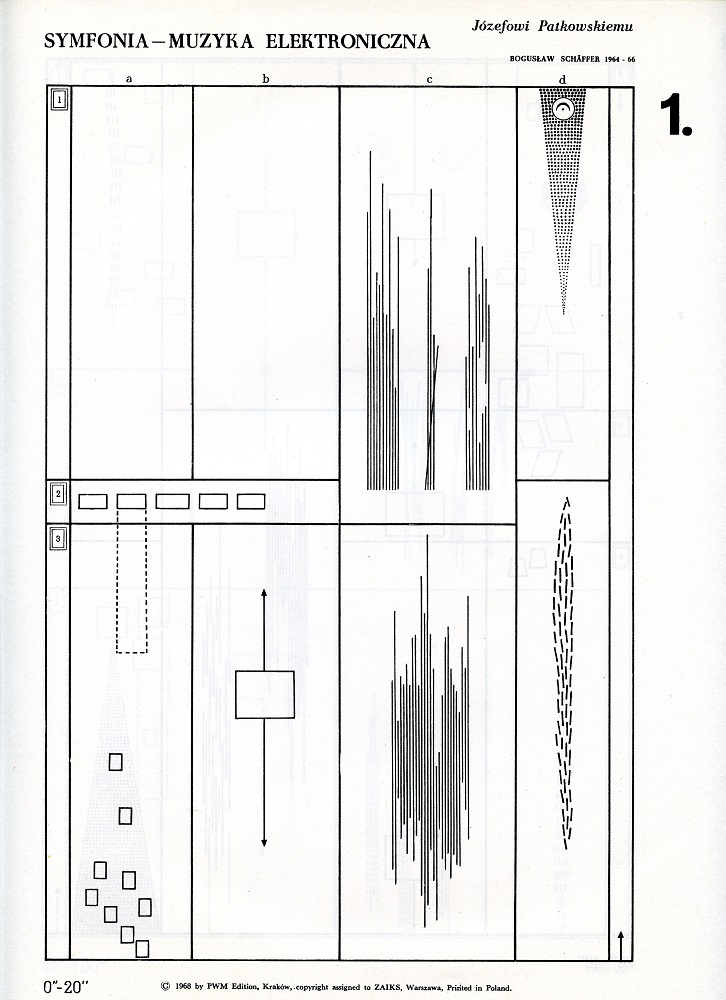
Bogusław Schaeffer, ‘Symphony – Electronic Music’, 1964, 1st page of the score. AUREA PORTA Foundation

Symphony. Electronic Music (Symfonia. Muzyka Elektroniczna) by Bogusław Schaeffer is one of the most interesting examples of tracks produced in the PRES. Instead of "working with the sound" in the studio, the composer designed graphic vertical scores, and included a detailed legend instructing the sound engineer, Bohdan Mazurek, to act according to the work environment. He was obligated to release a faithful production, no matter what studio he worked in. Schaefer did not object to the idea of producing the track in a different place (including a potential "studio of the future"), nor did he define the instrumentation, but only determined the parameters. Later reinterpretations of Schaeffer's track were performed by Barbara Okoń-Makowska, Dominik Kowalczyk (Wolfram) and Thomas Lehn.

Skalary by Eugeniusz Rudnik is a multi-version piece—it can be played from start to finish and from finish to start, at different speeds, and with altered left and right channel distribution. Any setting is possible. When, in 1965, a delegation of Soviet composers were invited to visit Poland during the Warsaw Autumn Festival, they fitted in with the conservative, socialist-realist style, restricted by Communist Party rules. Polish Radio had appointed Eugeniusz Rudnik to present the PRES's technical capabilities. As he was playing an excerpt from a track, one delegate asked him with a sneer: "Would it sound just as bad, if you played it backwards?". Rudnik didn't react at the time, but a year later he recorded Skalary, a composition sounding equally well no matter how it is played.

Andrzej Dobrowolski's Passacaglia was an attempt to create a baroque form of inference and sounds considered to be musical scraps. The track is subtitled “for forty out of five", a reference to the forty sound objects derived from five initial drum sounds.

== Composers associated with PRES ==
A whole range of Polish and foreign composers came through PRES. Produced here were tracks of: Włodzimierz Kotoński, Andrzej Dobrowolski, Tomasz Sikorski, Eugeniusz Rudnik, Krzysztof Penderecki, Zbigniew Wiszniewski, Bohdan Mazurek, Bogusław Schaeffer, as well as Arne Nordheim, Szábolcs Esztényi, Lejaren Hiller, the KEW Group (Elżbieta Sikora, Krzysztof Knittel, Wojciech Michniewski), Nicole Lachartre, Magdalena Długosz, Tomasz Stańko, Paweł Szymański, Andrzej Bieżan, Michael Ranta, Marek Chołoniewski, and Krzesimir Dębski.

== Bibliography ==
- Studio Eksperyment, Leksykon, Fundacja Bęc Zmiana, Warszawa 2012, ISBN 9788362418206
- Witold Rudziński, Muzyka naszego stulecia, Wydawnictwa Szkolne i Pedagogiczne, 1995 ISBN 9788302057465
- Włodzimierz Kotoński, Muzyka elektroniczna, Polskie Wydawnictwo Muzyczne, 2002 ISBN 9788322408100
- Dźwięki elektrycznego ciała. Eksperymenty w sztuce i muzyce w Europie Wschodniej 1957-1984 - red. David Crowley i Daniel Muzyczuk, Muzeum Sztuki w Łodzi, 2012, ISBN 9788387937980
- Krzysztof Szlifirski, New Technology and the Training of Composers in Experimental Music, 1970. Music and Technology. UNESCO/La revue Musicale, Stockholm & Paris, 1970. Prepared for UNESCO on the basis of the papers and reports of the meeting on Music and Technology, in Stockholm, Sweden in June 1970, la Revue Musicale, Paris. 13 papers delivered at the meeting.
