= Daniel Biro =

Daniel Andrew Biro (born 1963) is a London-based composer, keyboard player and producer. He is the founder of the Sargasso record label, established in 1993.

Biro has released multiple albums as a solo artist and in collaboration with projects including Mysteries of the Revolution and Echo Engine, as well as recordings with bassist Colin Bass of the band Camel.

His work spans electronic, ambient, experimental, jazz-fusion, progressive rock . He has also composed music for film, television and theatre.

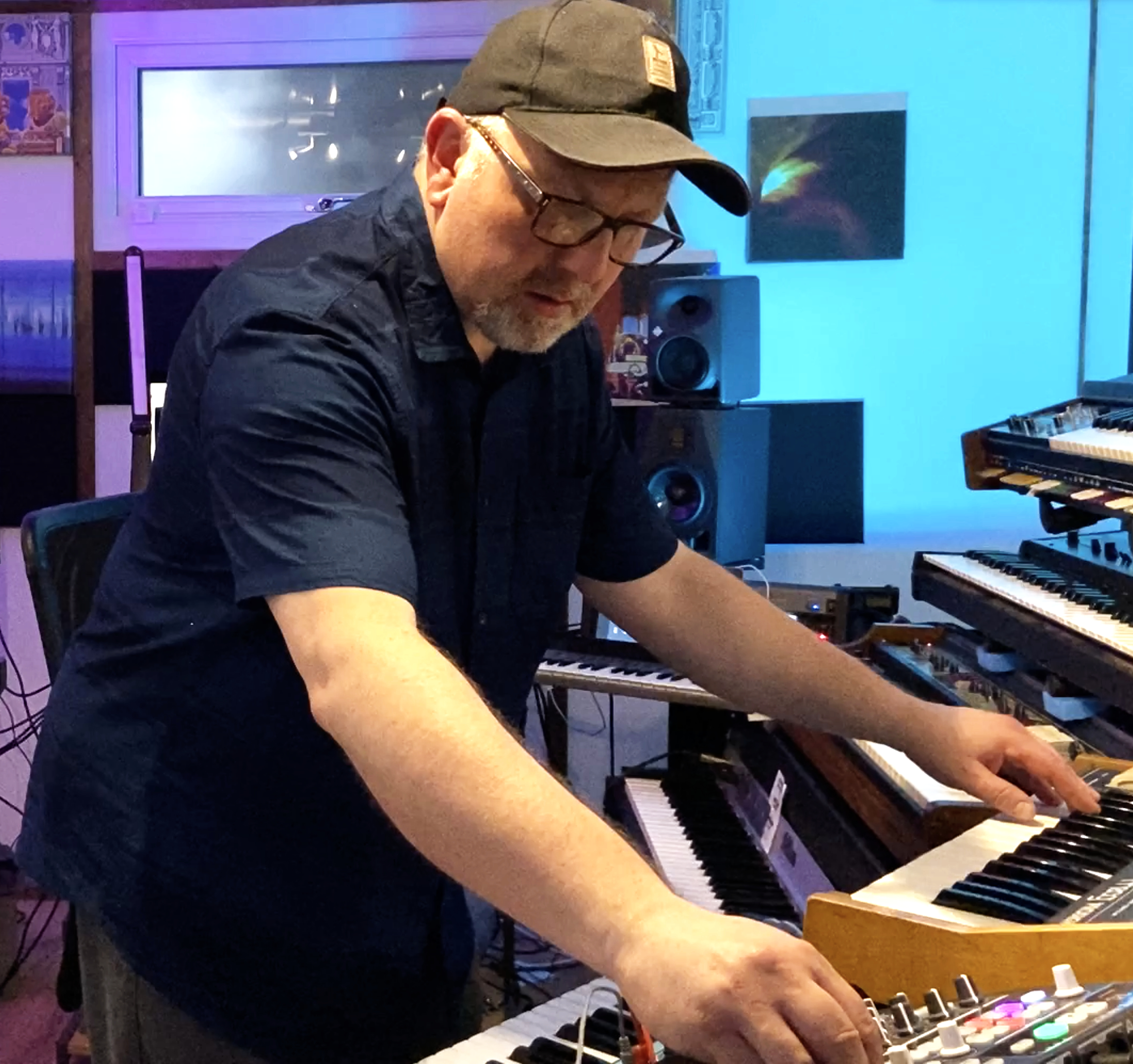
Daniel Biro in his studio - 2022

== Early life and education ==
Biro was born in Johannesburg, South Africa, in 1963 to a family of Hungarian and Croatian origin. He spent his childhood in Italy, the United Kingdom and France.

He began playing piano at an early age and studied at the Monaco Jazz Conservatory. He later pursued music studies at the University of Nice.

In 1984, he was a finalist in the International Competition of Jazz Composition of Monaco.

== Career ==
In 1985, Biro moved to London with his band I.C., which soon disbanded. He remained in London, working as a pianist while developing connections in the local music and arts scene. During this period he toured as a keyboard player with musicians including Dennis Greaves and performed with the band Big Bam Boo.

In 1993, Biro founded the Sargasso record label, initially to release his own recordings, beginning with the album Soho Square. The label later expanded to focus on contemporary and experimental music, releasing work by composers including John Palmer, Lawrence Casserley, Vinko Globokar, Natasha Barrett, Violeta Dinescu, Jonty Harrison, Simon Emmerson, James Wood and Jonathan Harvey.

Biro has collaborated with choreographer Jane Turner on a number of interdisciplinary performance projects, including E-Merge, which was presented at the Institute of Contemporary Arts in London in 2006. His work with Turner explored concepts related to Emergence and interactive systems.

He has composed music for film and television, including Things of the Endless Wanderer, which was selected for the Sundance Film Festival, and documentary projects such as Auschwitz Untold in Color and NFT: WTF?.

In the 2020s, Biro released a series of solo keyboard performances under the title Synthrospections, recorded and streamed online during the COVID-19 pandemic.

Biro has also collaborated with Colin Bass on the albums Still (2020) and More (2024), which feature contributions from guitarist Andy Latimer.

== Discography ==
Solo albums

- Soho Square (1993)
- The Comparative Anatomy of Angels (1996)
- Elegant Enigmas (1999)
- A Still, Thin Sound (2009)
- Songs of Refuge (2012)
- Shir Hadash (2014)
- 120 Onetwenty (2018)
- Synthrospections (series, 2021–2023)
- Music for the Coviad (2022)
- Hotel Erika (2024)

Collaborative albums

- Still (with Colin Bass, 2020)
- More (with Colin Bass, 2024)
- Longing For The Dawn (with Mysteries of the Revolution, 2022)
- Windjammer (with Echo Engine, 2014)

Selected film and television work

- Things of the Endless Wanderer (2014)
- Auschwitz Untold in Color (2019)
- NFT: WTF? (2024)
