= Sergio Luque =

Sergio Luque is a composer of vocal, instrumental and electroacoustic music. His work often involves computer-aided algorithmic composition and stochastic processes.

His music has been performed by the Birmingham Contemporary Music Group, Les Jeunes Solistes, Garth Knox, the Nieuw Ensemble and the Schönberg Ensemble, among others, and has been presented in the United Kingdom, the Netherlands, Germany, France, Switzerland, Austria, Spain, the United States, Mexico, Cuba, El Salvador, Chile, Argentina, Japan and Australia.

He has a PhD in Musical Composition from the University of Birmingham, where he studied with Jonty Harrison and Scott Wilson, and was a member of BEAST (Birmingham ElectroAcoustic Sound Theatre). During his PhD, he worked on the development of stochastic synthesis, a synthesis technique invented by Iannis Xenakis.

In 2006, he received a master's degree with Distinction in Sonology from the Institute of Sonology at the Royal Conservatory of The Hague, studying with Paul Berg and Kees Tazelaar. In 2004, he received a master's degree in Composition from the Conservatory of Rotterdam, studying with Klaas de Vries and René Uijlenhoet. He has a bachelor's degree in Composition from the Musical Studies and Research Centre (CIEM, Mexico).
