= Frank Corcoran =

Irish composer (born 1944)

Frank Corcoran (/ˈkɔːrkərən/ KOR-kər-ən; born 1 May 1944) is an Irish composer. His output includes chamber, symphonic, choral and electro-acoustic music, through which he often explores Irish mythology and history.

== Life ==
"I came late to art music; childhood soundscapes live on. The best work with imagination/intellect must be exorcistic-laudatory-excavatory. I am a passionate believer in "Irish" dream-landscape, two languages, polyphony of history, not ideology or programme. No Irish composer has yet dealt adequately with our past. The way forward – newest forms and technique (for me especially macro-counterpoint) – is the way back to deepest human experience."

Born in Borrisokane, County Tipperary, Corcoran studied at Dublin, Maynooth (1961–4), Rome (1967–9) and Berlin (1969–71), where he was a pupil of Boris Blacher. He was a music inspector for the Irish government Department of Education from 1971 to 1979, after which he took up a composer fellowship from the Berlin Künstlerprogramm (1980–1). He has taught in Berlin (1981), Stuttgart (1982) and Hamburg, where he has been professor of composition and theory in the Staatliche Hochschule für Musik und darstellende Kunst (1983–2008). He was a visiting professor and Fulbright scholar at the University of Wisconsin–Milwaukee in the U.S. in 1989-90 and has been a guest lecturer at CalArts, Harvard University, Princeton University, Boston College, New York University, and Indiana University.

Corcoran has been a member of Aosdána, the Irish academy of creative artists, since its inception in 1983. He was the first Irish composer to have had a symphony premiered in Vienna (1st Symphony, Symphonies of Symphonies of Wind, in 1981).

Corcoran lives in Germany and Italy.

== Music ==
In the late 1970s, Corcoran developed a technique he calls "macro-counterpoint". Related to similar approaches by Witold Lutosławski and György Ligeti, it "refers to the contrapuntal treatment of layers of sound as opposed to the traditional focus of the intervallic compatibility of one line with another" as in traditional counterpoint. The first composition in which he applied this technique was the Piano Trio (1978). Here, the three instruments each form an independent layer of sound, moving at their own speed and in individual time signatures, numbers of bars, etc. The individual lines remain transparent throughout. At specific points in the score, the musicians are asked to pause in order to start again simultaneously.

Corcoran's strong identification with his Irish heritage has led to many compositions inspired by Celtic Irish mythology, and modern Irish literature. A series of works in various genres written between 1996 and 2003 focus on the life of "Mad Sweeney", a minor 7th-century king from the north of Ireland who is the subject of the ancient Irish tale Buile Shuibhne. Many other works also have an Irish focus, including the choral Nine Medieval Irish Epigrams (1973), the percussion piece Music for the Book of Kells (1990) and some works referring to the work of Irish writers James Joyce, Samuel Beckett, Gabriel Rosenstock, and Seamus Heaney.

Another series of works with titles beginning with the word "Quasi ...", written since 1999 (ongoing), highlights and interprets concepts such as visions or musical forms and expressions such as concertino, lamento, fuga, sarabanda, pizzicato, etc. which serve as both inspiration for the music and as creative raw material.

== Awards ==
Corcoran has won a number of awards throughout his career. Recent awards include:

- Feis Ceoil Prize, 1973
- Varming Prize, 1974
- Dublin Symphony Orchestra Prize, 1975
- Studio Akustische Kunst, Cologne, in 1995 (for Joycepeak Music)
- Bourges International Electro-acoustic Music Competition, 1999 (for Sweeney's Vision)
- EMS Prize, Stockholm, 2002 (for Quasi Una Missa)
- Sean Ó Riada Memorial Prize at the Cork International Choral Festival, 2011
- First Prize Outright of the International Foundation for Choral Music, 2013 (for 8 Haikus)

== Selected compositions ==
Orchestral

- Symphony No. 1 (1980)
- Symphony No. 2 (1981)
- Concerto for String Orchestra (1982)
- Symphony No. 3 (1994)
- Mikrokosmoi (1994)
- Symphony No. 4 (1996)
- Quasi un canto (2002)
- Quasi un concertino (2003)
- Quasi una visione (2004)
- Quasi una fuga (2005)
- Violin Concerto (2011)
- Variations on Myself (2012), chamber orch
- Cello Concerto (2014)
- Quasi una storia (2015)
- Quasi un concerto per clarinetto ed archi (2017)

Chamber ensembles

- Wind Quintet No. 2 (1978)
- Piano Trio (1978), vn, vc, pf
- Shadows of Gilgamesh (1988), fl, ob, cl, hn, tpt, trombones, perc, pf, vn, va, vc, db
- Music for the Book of Kells (1990), 5perc, pf
- Four Concertini of Ice (1993), fl, ob, cl, hn, vn, vc, db, perc
- Trauerfelder (1995), 4perc
- Wind Quintet No. 3 (1999)
- Sweeney's Smithereens (2000), fl, pic, cl+bcl, perc, pf, vn, db
- Quasi un amore (2002), fl, gui
- Quasi una Sarabande (2008), cl, bn, hn, 2vn, va, vc, db
- Clarinet Quintet (2011)
- Rhapsodic Bowing (2012), 8vc
- Nine Looks at Pierrot (2013), fl+picc, cl+bcl, vn, vc, pf
- Quasi una Storia (2014), 8vn, 2va, 2vc, db
- 8 Irish Duets for Cello and Piano (2015)
- Piano Trio (2016), va, vc, pf
- String Quartet (2016)

Solo instrumental

- Sonata for Organ (1973)
- The Quare Hawk (1974), flute
- Hernia (1977), double bass
- Changes (1979), piano
- Variations on 'Caleno costure me' (1982), harpsichord
- Three Pieces for Solo Clarinet (1987)
- Three Pieces for Guitar (1990)
- Ice-Etchings No. 2 (1996), cello
- Sweeney's Total Rondo (2002), piano
- Variations on 'A Mháirín de Barra' (2004), viola
- Nine Pratoleva Pearls (2008), piano
- A Dark Song (2011), bass clarinet
- In the Deep Heart's Core (2011), harp
- Snapshot (2012), cello
- Seven Miniatures for Solo Violin (2013)

Vocal and choral

- Nine Medieval Irish Epigrams (1973), satb
- Ceol an Aifrinn (1980)
- Gilgamesh (1990), 7 soli, satb, orchestra
- Nine Aspects of a Poem (1989; rev. 2003), satb, vn
- Carraig aonair (1976), soprano, alto, pf
- Kiesel (1980), soprano, 2vn, va
- Cúig amhráin de chuid Gabriel Rosenstock (1980), soprano, vn, vc, pf
- Dán Aimhirgín (1989), soprano, va, bcl, pf
- Buile Suibhne (1998), fl+pic+afl, ob, cl+bcl, hn, perc, vn, va, vc, db, spkr
- Quasi una melodia (2001), soprano, tsax, va, mar, pf
- Quasi un pizzicato (2004), fl, hp, pf, perc, spkr
- The Light Gleams (2006), soprano, bcl, vn, vc
- Four Orchestral Prayers (2006), mezzo, orch
- Five Lieder (2010), tenor, pf
- Songs of Terror and Love (2011), bass, fl+picc+afl, cl+bcl, pf, vn+va, vc
- Eight Haikus (2012), satb
- My Alto Rhapsodies (2014), alto, orch
- An Irish Christmas Carol (2014), satb

Electro-acoustic

- Balthazar's Dream (1980)
- Farewell Symphonies (1982), with speaker & orch
- Sweeney's Vision (1997)
- Quasi una missa (1999)
- Tradurre – Tradire (2005)

== Recordings ==
- Piano Trio; The Quare Hawk; String Quartet No. 1; Gestures of Sound and Silence, Mythologies, performed by Hesketh Trio, Madeleine Berkeley (fl), Testore Quartet, Aisling Drury-Byrne (vc), Frank Corcoran (pf), Roger Doyle (perc), on: Self Help 101 (LP, 1980).
- Mikrokosmoi, performed by Irish Chamber Orchestra, Fionnuala Hunt (cond.), on: Black Box Music BBM 1013 (CD, 1998).
- Symphonies No. 2, 3, and 4, performed by National Symphony Orchestra of Ireland, Colman Pearce (cond.), on: Marco Polo 8.225107 (CD, 1999).
- Mad Sweeney; Music for the Book of Kells; Wind Quintet; Sweeney's Vision, performed by Das Neue Werk NDR Ensemble, Percussion Modern, Stuttgart Wind Quintet, on: Black Box Music BBM 1026 (CD, 1999).
- Trauerfelder, performed by Modern Percussion, Joachim Winkler (cond.), on: Hochschule für Musik und Theater Hamburg [no label code] (CD, 2000).
- Quasi una missa; Piano Trio; Balthasar's Dream; Five Rosenstock Lieder; Wind Quintet No. 3; Sweeney's Farewell, performed by Hesketh Trio, Sabine Sommerfeld (soprano), Hamburg Trio, Daedalus Quintet, on: col legno WWE 1CD 20214 (CD, 2003).
- Sweeney's Smithereens; Five Trauerfelder; Tradurre – Tradire; Concert for String Orchestra; Five Songs Without Words, performed by Ensemble für Neue Musik München & Dieter Cichewicz (cond.), Percussion-Ensemble München & Dieter Cichewicz (cond.), Die Maulwerker & electronics, Irish Chamber Orchestra & David Robertson (cond.), Das Neue Werk NDR Ensemble & Dieter Cichewicz (cond.), on: Composers Art Label cal-13017 (CD, 2003).
- Quasi una visione; Ice-Etchings No. 2; Quasi un concerto; Quasi Variations on 'A Mhárín de Bharra'; Quasi un pizzicato; Quasi Aspects of an Irish Poem, performed by Ensemble Modern & Sian Edwards (cond.), David Stromberg (vc), Cantus Kammerorchester & Beroslaw Sipus (cond.), Wireworks Ensemble & René Gulikers (cond.), National Chamber Choir & Celso Antunes (cond.), Constantin Zanidache (va), on: Composers Art Label cal-13021 (CD, 2006).
- Cello Concerto; Rhapsodietta Joyceana; Rhapsodic Bowing; Duetti Irlandesi, performed by Martin Johnson (vc), Fergal Caulfield (pf), RTÉ National Symphony Orchestra, Gavin Maloney (cond.), on: RTÉ lyric fm CD 154 (CD, 2017).

== Bibliography ==
- Annette Kreutziger-Herr: "Frank Corcoran", in Komponisten der Gegenwart (KdG) (Munich: edition text+kritik, 1992ff.), 5th supplement, July 1994.
- Axel Klein: Die Musik Irlands im 20. Jahrhundert (Hildesheim: Georg Olms Verlag, 1996).
- John Page: "A Post-War 'Irish' Symphony: Frank Corcoran's Symphony No. 2", in: Gareth Cox & Axel Klein (eds.): Irish Music in the Twentieth Century (Dublin: Four Courts Press, 2003), pp. 134–149.
- Hazel Farrell: "Corcoran, Frank", in: The Encyclopaedia of Music in Ireland, ed. by Harry White & Barra Boydell (Dublin: UCD Press, 2013), pp. 243–5.
- Benjamin Dwyer: "An Interview with Frank Corcoran", in: B. Dwyer: Different Voices. Irish Music and Music in Ireland (Hofheim: Wolke Verlag, 2014), pp. 94–111.
- Hans-Dieter Grünefeld (ed.): Old and New – Sean agus Núa. An Irish Composer Invents Himself. Frank Corcoran. Festschrift at Seventy (Lübeck: the editor, 2015); ISBN 978-3-00-050153-1.
