= Scott Wilson (composer) =

Canadian composer (born 1969)

Scott Wilson (born November 26, 1969, in Vancouver) is a Canadian composer. He studied music and composition in Canada, the U.S., and Germany, and his teachers include Barry Truax, Wolfgang Rihm, Christos Hatzis, Gary Kulesha, Ron Kuivila, Alvin Lucier, Owen Underhill, Neely Bruce and David Gordon Duke. Since 2004 he has lived in Birmingham, UK, where he is Reader in Electronic Music and Director of Birmingham ElectroAcoustic Sound Theatre and the Electroacoustic Studios at the University of Birmingham.

His works include pieces both for instrumental and electroacoustic forces. He is the Director of Birmingham ElectroAcoustic Sound Theatre, for which he has developed custom software, and an active developer of the SuperCollider computer music language. He was the lead editor of The SuperCollider Book published by MIT Press, was a co-author of Electronic Music with Nick Collins (composer) and Margaret Schedel published by Cambridge University Press, and has published in journals including Organised Sound and the Computer Music Journal.

His music has been performed internationally, with performances at the Huddersfield Festival, the Mouvement Festival, the Trash Festival, Open Ears, the Inventionen Festival in Berlin, and the Cool Drummings Festival, and broadcast on CBC Radio 2, Radio France, Netherlands Concertzender, and BBC Radio 3. Works have been performed by Darragh Morgan, Esprit Orchestra, Birmingham Contemporary Music Group, and others, and has been recorded on labels including Edition RZ Diatribe Records and 326 music.

Notable former students include Sergio Luque, Norah Lorway, Richard Bullen, Shelly Knotts, and Sam Pluta.
