= Konstancja Kochaniec =

Polish classical and film music composer (born 1976)

- Born: 27 May 1976 (age 50); Wrocław, Poland
- Occupation: Composer

Konstancja Kochaniec (born 27 May 1976) is a Polish classical and film music composer. She has pursued independent creative activities, such as film music, television, theater music, solo music, chamber music, electronic music, as well as in the field of synthesis of the arts (including music concert painting of Mary A. Orzechowska Club Literary and Music in Wrocław, Poland).

== Education ==
- The National School of Music in Wrocław, Poland;
- 1991–97 Richard Bukowski School of Music in Wrocław, piano class of Andrzej Janusz;
- 1997–2003 Department of Music Theory, Composition, and Conducting, at the Academy of Music in Wrocław, Poland;
- 2003–2006 Student of Wlodzimierz Kotonski in Warsaw, Poland;
- 2006 – professional degree in composition at the Academy of Music in Katowice, under supervision of prof. Wieslaw Cienciala;
- 2009 – Master of Arts degree in composition at the Academy of Music in Katowice, under supervision of prof. Wieslaw Cienciala;
- Participated in many optional courses of contemporary music, including in 2004 in Klodzkiej Bystrica, Poland, where studied under the guidance of Boguslaw Schaeffer and Hector Fiore.

== Memberships ==
- Polish composers association
- Association of Performing Artists

== Compositions ==
=== Selected classical and modern music ===
- Four epigrams, for solo flute (Cztery fraszki, na flet solo) (1998)
- Dead I miss (Umarla tesknie), miniature piano (1998)
- The colors (Kolory), the duo for violin and light (1999)
- A song with a melody (Utwór z melodia), for piano and didgeridoo (1999)
- Female (Kobieta), for solo violin (1999)
- Madness (Szalenstwo), String Quintet (1999)
- Something for cello (Cos na skrzypce), (2001)
- Symphonic impressions (Impresje symfoniczne), (2003)
- Three Sonnets (Trzy sonety), for soprano, mezzo-soprano, bass and symphony orchestra, to the words of William Shakespeare in the translation of Maciej Slomczynski (2007–2008)
- Nike (Nike), for cello solo (2008)
- Psyche (Psyche), for cello solo (2008)
- Sinfonietta Concertante (Sinfonietta Concertante), for oboe, violin, cello and orchestra (2009)
- Fantasy Fire and Ashes (Fantazja Ogien i Popiól), for solo organ (2010)
- Nocturne 1 (Nokturn 1), for Piano (2011)
- Litany of the Blessed Virgin Mary of Strzegom (Litania do Matki Boskiej Strzegomskiej), for solo organ (2012)
- Nocturne dell 'anima (Notturno dell 'anima), (2012)
- Nocturne No 3 Nocturne Of Questions (2014)

=== Selected film and TV program music ===
- TV news cycle literary programs (Telewizyjne wiadomosci literackie), real. Miroslaw Spychalski (2009)
- Documentary Underground City (Podziemne miasto), dir. Agnieszka Zwiefka-Chwalek (2009)
- The series of documentaries 13 minutes into the past (cykl programów dokumentalnych 13 minut w przeszlosc), dir. Martin Bradke (2009)
- Documentary City of meetings (film dokumentalny Miasto spotkan), dir. Eve Sitek (2011)
- Music Lab program ideas (program Laboratorium pomyslów), Part 1 to Part 30. Dir. Agnieszka Zwiefka-Chwalek (2011)
- Condemned Soldiers. Jerzy Woźniak. Part I. Cursed Time (Żołnierze Wyklęci. Jerzy Woźniak. Część I. Przeklęty Czas), dir. S. Gorski
- Condemned Soldiers. Jerzy Woźniak. Part II. The Finger of God (Żołnierze Wyklęci. Jerzy Woźniak. Część II. Palec Boży), dir. S. Gorski
- Condemned Soldiers. Jerzy Woźniak. Part III. Restore the Truth (Żołnierze Wyklęci. Jerzy Woźniak. Część III. Przywrócić Prawdę), dir. S. Gorski
- Program TVP Krakow Good Money (program TVP Kraków Dobre pieniadze), dir. Witold Gadowski (2012)
- QUEEN OF SKYLINE (KRÓLOWA PANORAM), (2013)
- There, where you can live (Tam, gdzie da sie zyc), (2014)
