= Basil Athanasiadis =

Greek composer (born 1970)

- Born: 1970 (age 55–56); Katerini, Greece
- Education: National Conservatoire of Athens.; Trinity College of Music.; Royal Academy of Music.; Canterbury Christ Church University.
- Occupations: Musician; Composer; Conductor
- Awards: CCCU Research Studentship Award.; JSPS Postdoctoral Fellowship Award.

Basil Athanasiadis (Greek: Βασίλης Αθανασιάδης, born in 1970 in Katerini, Greece) is a Greek composer based in the United Kingdom.

== Early life and education ==
Athanasiadis, after completing his piano and advanced theory studies (harmony, counterpoint, fugue) at the National Conservatoire of Athens, moved to London, England. He studied composition at the Trinity College of Music with Daryl Runswick, the Royal Academy of Music with Paul Patterson, and finally at the Canterbury Christ Church University (CCCU), in Canterbury, Kent, England, where he obtained his Doctor of Philosophy (PhD) dissertation under the supervision of Roderick Watkins and Paul Patterson supported by the Research Studentship Award.

== Career ==
In 2010, Athanasiadis was the recipient of the JSPS Postdoctoral Fellowship Award (2010–2011). Based at the Tokyo University of the Arts as a Special Foreign Researcher, he composed new works for Western and Japanese instruments with a particular interest on the shō (mouth organ) and the 20-stringed koto.

Some of those works were presented in a series of concerts culminating to a large-scale performance project that took place at the Sogakudo Hall on 23 January 2011. The same year he was awarded the JSPS Postdoctoral Fellowship Award (November 30, 2011 – November 29, 2013) for the second time to further his research with Research Subject The Japanese Aesthetic of Wabi Sabi and its Potential in Contemporary Composition and support the composition of new works for Japanese and Western instruments and their performance in both Japan and Europe.

Athanasiadis' works are characterised by a strong visual identity; his performances has often been accompanied by dance or stage action. Early influences can be traced in Sergiu Celibidache's views on aspects of ambience and acoustic space (Athanasiadis attended Sergiu Celibidache's Munich seminars in 1994), and in composers such as Christou, Feldman and Takemitsu. His most recent works focus on the Japanese aesthetic of wabi-sabi, which has also been the main subject of his doctoral and postdoctoral research since 2004.

Athanasiadis's music has been published by Oxford University Press and United Music Publishers and selected works have been released on CD by Dutton Epoch, Sargasso Records, Regent Records, Fonorum and the Choir & Organ magazine (cover CD for March/April 2009 issue).

Basil Athanasiadis's works have been performed in Europe, US, Canada and Asia by ensembles such as the London Sinfonietta, Amsterdam Loeki Stardust Quartet, New London Chamber Ensemble, Silk String Quartet, Okeanos, Mondriaan Quartet, Alea III, Shonorities and choirs such as the BBC Singers, Wells Cathedral Choir, Cambridge Chapel Choir of Selwyn College, Montreal Christ Church Cathedral Choir.

== Selected works ==
Athanasiadis's compositions include the following:

- Book of Dreams (2002) for flute and piano
- This Leaf is Selected (2003) for flute, oboe, clarinet, piano, violin and cello
- Anamnisis (2003) for solo piano
- Knots II (2003) for violin and organ
- Dream Fragments (2004) for solo cello
- Terpsichore Bemused (2004) for two pianos
- For the Ice (2005) for violin and piano
- Faded Shonoriites (2005) for wind quintet
- Little Songs of the Geisha (2006) for female voice, flute, violin and cello
- Ithaka (2006) for sho, shakuhachi, samisen, koto, harp, oboe d'amore, clarinet and viola
- For the Ice II (2006) for soprano saxophone and piano
- Antiphon to Mary (2006) for choir and organ
- Faded Shonorities II (2007) for alto saxophone and marimba
- Fantasmata (2007) for female voice, flute, violin, cello and piano
- Jardin d'Iris (2009) for female voice, violin and electronics
- Dance of the Seven Veils (2010) for percussion trio
- Interrupted Dreams (2010) for sho and 20-stringed koto
- Clouds that I Like (2011 Sargasso Records) for female voice, sho, 20-stringed koto and string trio
- Tear from the Moon (2010) for 20-string koto
- Jardin d'Iris (2010) for female voice, violin and electronics
- Stray Cat's Dream (2012) for piano
- Youki (2012) for piano
- Shinobu Koi (2012) for violin
- Aura (2013) for Sho and vibraphone
- To the Touch (2013) for sho and violin
- Utakata (2013) for violin and 20-stringed koto
- Air Still (2013) for female voice and sho
- Soft Light (2014) for female voice, flute and piano
- The Cat in Love (2014) for female voice, violin and piano
- Little Songs of the Geisha II (2006) for female voice, sho and violin
- Eyes are now dim (2016) for female voice, sho, violin and koto
- Dream of a Butterfly III (2017) for piano
- Book of Dreams II (2017) for alto flute and string quartet
- Shonorities - Soft Light (2018)
- Shonorities - Book of Dreams (2019)
- Circles (2023) for wind quintet
- Echo I (2023) for 1 to 4 female voices
- Echo II (2023) for 1-4 female voices
- Echo III (2023) for 2-4 female voices
- Echo IV (2023) for 2-4 female voices
- Echo V (2023) for 4 female voices
- Echo VI (2023) for 5 female voices
