= Krzysztof Knittel =

Polish composer

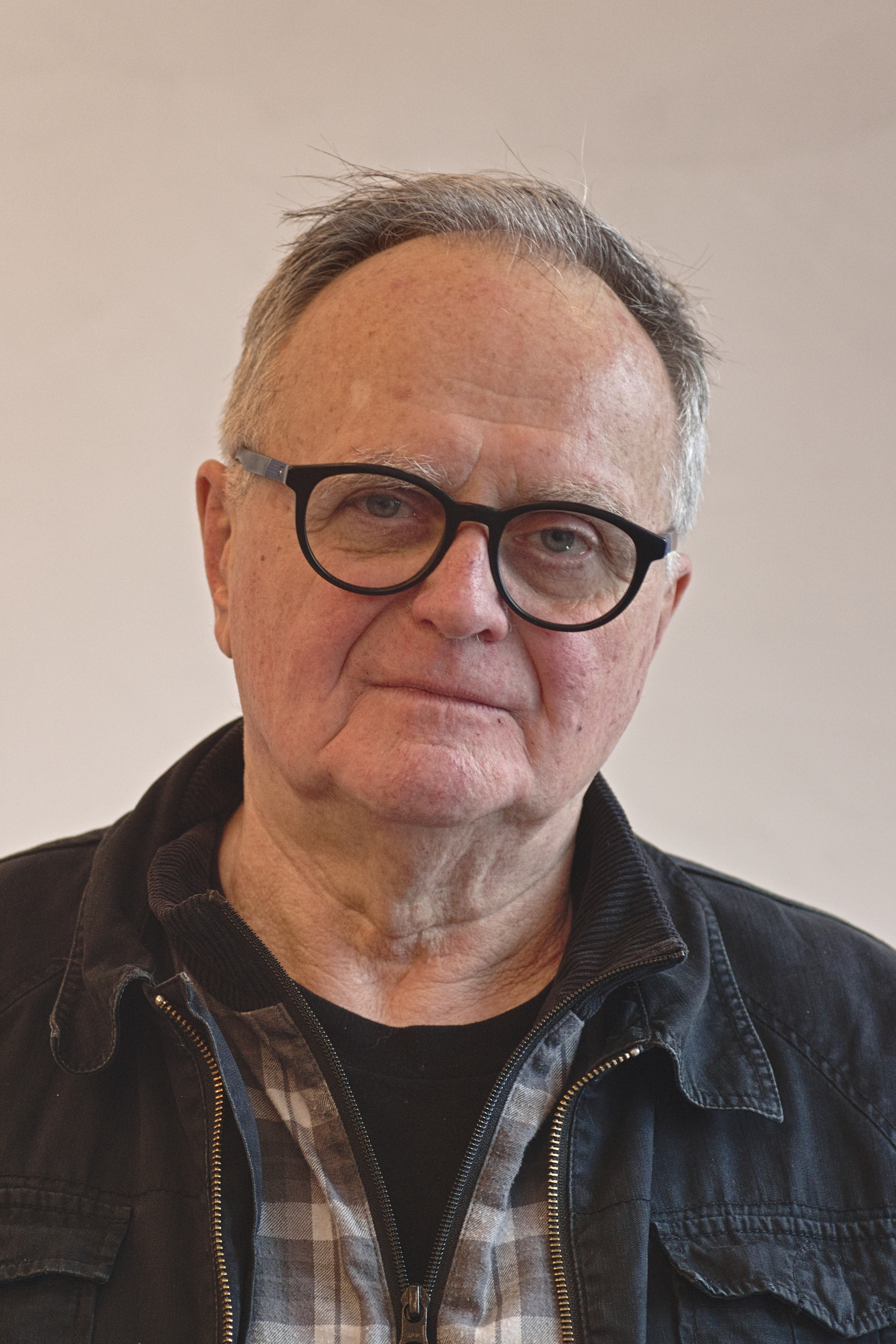
Knittel in 2025

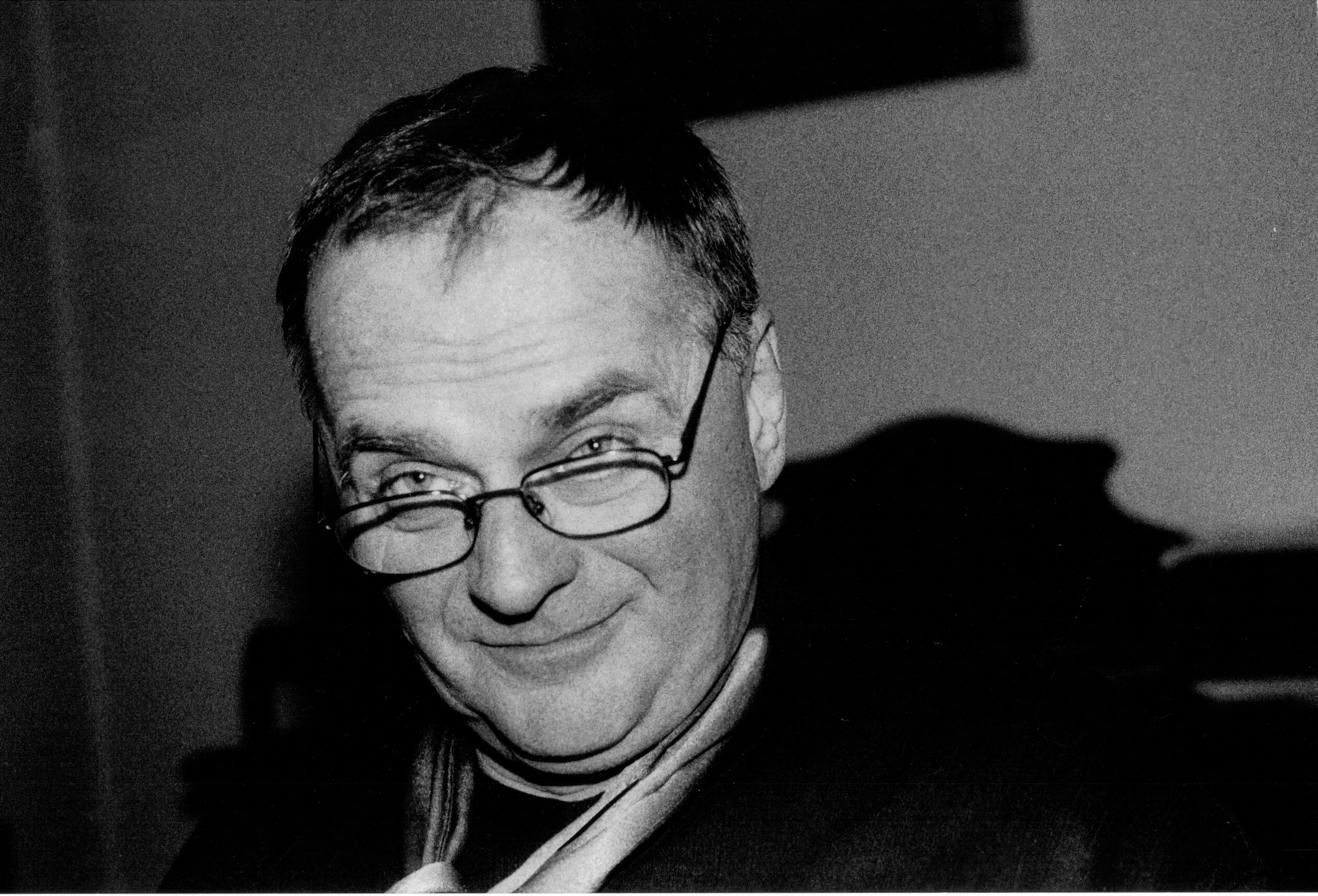
Knittel in 2008

Krzysztof Knittel (born 1 May 1947) is a Polish composer of symphonic, chamber, stage and electroacoustic works.

Knittel was born in Warsaw. He studied sound engineering and composition with Tadeusz Baird, Andrzej Dobrowolski, Wlodzimierz Kotonski at the Frederic Chopin Academy of Music in Warsaw. He also studied computer music with Lejaren Hiller and programming at the Mathematical Institute of the Polish Academy of Sciences (1974–75).

He attended Summer Courses of New Music in Darmstadt in 1974 and 1976. He has worked at the Experimental Studio of Polish Radio since 1973 and at the Center for the Creative and Performing Arts at State University of New York at Buffalo in 1978. He composes symphonic, chamber, stage, electroacoustic and computer works that have been performed in most European countries, Asia, North and South Americas. He took part in many art performances, built sound installations and played in improvised music groups.

His compositions were written for the National Philharmonic Orchestra and Choir, National Symphony Orchestra of the Polish Radio, “Amadeus” Chamber Orchestra of the Polish Radio, Sinfonia Varsovia Orchestra, Camerata Silesia Choir, and for numerous soloists.

== Performances ==
Concerts dedicated exclusively to his music were held in Barcelona, Budapest, Cracow, Kromeriz, Leipzig, Moscow, Sao Paulo, Warsaw. Knittel co-founded the following:

- KEW Composers Group (1973–75; with Elisabeth Sikora and Wojciech Michniewski)
- Cytula Tyfun da Bamba Orchester (1981)
- Independent Electroacoustic Music Studio (1982–84)
- Interdisciplinary group Freight Train (since 1986)
- European Improvisation Orchestra (1996–98)
- CH&K&K (since 1999; with Marek Choloniewski and Wlodzimierz Kiniorski)
- Mad Cavaliers (since 2003)

== Honours and awards ==
Among his honors are the Solidarity Award in Music (1985), Foundation for Contemporary Arts Grants to Artists Award (1998), Norwid Price in Music (2003), Polish Composers' Union Prize (2003). In 2005 he was awarded by Polish Minister of Culture with “Gloria Artis” Silver Medal.

He served as director of the International Festival of Contemporary Music "Warsaw Autumn" (1995–98), president of the Polish Composers' Union (1999–2003), vice-president of the Polish Music Council (since 2000) and president (since 2005), the member of the Supervisory Board of the public Polish Television (2003–2006). Director of international Ad Libitum festival of improvised music since 2006. A member of the Programming Board of Zacheta National Gallery (2004–2012). Professor of the Fryderyk Chopin Music University, he teaches also at the music academies in Krakow and Lodz.
