= Sargasso Records =

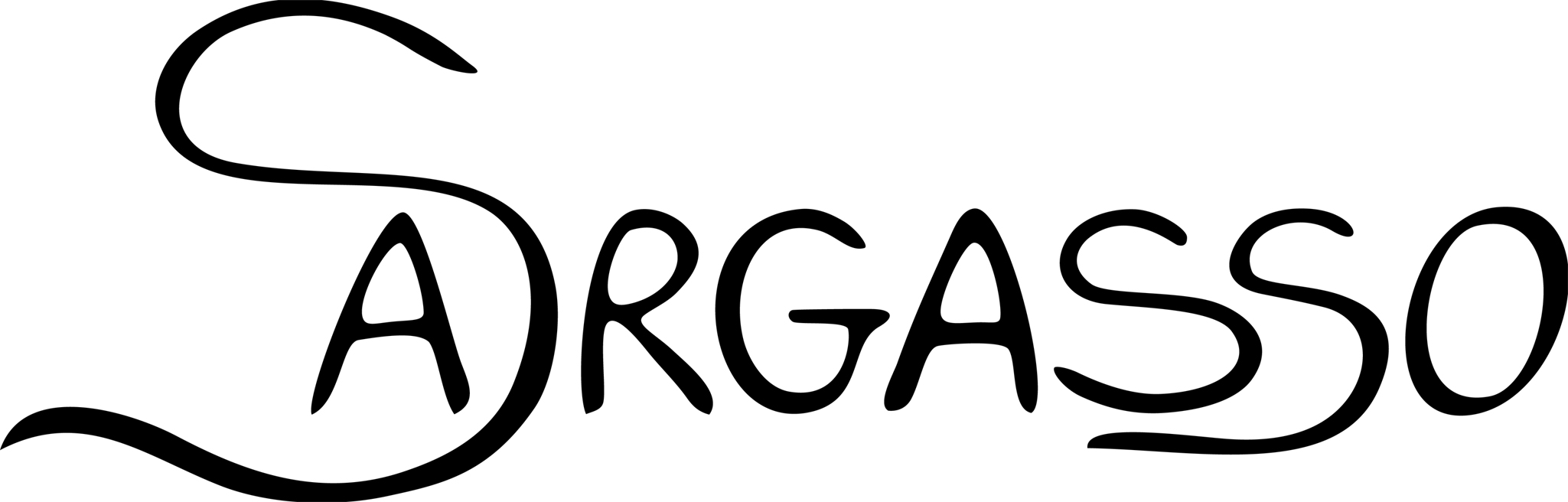
- Founded: 1993
- Genre: Avant Garde
- Country of origin: U.K.
- Official website: sargasso.com

Sargasso is a London-based record label and live events promotion company founded by Daniel Biro.

It was established 1993 and integrated into Esfor Limited in 2008. It specialises in mostly avant garde, innovative and contemporary experimental music.

== List of artists ==
- Alienstalk
- Joseph Anderson
- Basil Athanasiadis
- Paul Barker
- Birmingham ElectroAcoustic Sound Theatre
- Daniel Biro
- Lawrence Casserley
- Jane Chapman
- Violeta Dinescu
- Michael Edwards
- Simon Emmerson
- Evelyn Ficarra
- Ambrose Field
- Vinko Globokar
- Anna Harvey
- Jonathan Harvey
- Erdem Helvacıoğlu
- Hyperyak
- L'Orange
- John McGuire
- John 'Noise' Manis
- Kaffe Matthews
- Philip Mead
- Eduardo Reck Miranda
- Gilbert Nouno
- Felipe Otondo
- John Palmer
- Rob Palmer
- Sirin Pancaroglu
- Gwyn Pritchard
- Siren Circus
- Songs from a Random House
- Adam Stansbie
- Markus Stockhausen
- Adam Summerhayes
- Daniel Teruggi
- Marco Trevisani
- Karmella Tsepkolenko
- Frances-Marie Uitti
- Mike Willox
