= Eugeniusz Rudnik =

- Born: 28 October 1932; Nadkole, Poland
- Origin: Polish
- Died: 24 October 2016 (aged 83)
- Occupations: Composer, sound director, sound engineer
- Instrument: Electroacoustic
- Years active: 1960–2016

Eugeniusz Rudnik (28 October 1932 – 24 October 2016) was a modern Polish composer, electronics engineer and sound engineer and a pioneer of electronic and electro-acoustic music in Poland.

== Early life ==
Rudnik was born on 28 October 1932 in Nadkole.

In 1967 he graduated from the Faculty of Electronics on Warsaw University of Technology. From 1955 he worked for Polish Radio, at first as the manager of plumbers, carpenters and painters.

== Career ==
In 1958 Rudnik started working in the Experimental Studio of the Polish Radio, the fourth such facility in Europe, founded and directed by Józef Patkowski. Between 1967 and 1968, he worked in the Studio for Electronic Music of the Westdeutscher Rundfunk in Cologne, when he cooperated with Włodzimierz Kotoński by the implementation of Klangspiele. In the late 1960s and 1970s Rudnik co-created some of Norwegian composer Arne Nordheim's works, including "Colorazione" and "Solitaire" (1969).

Rudnik was one of the first Polish electroacoustic music producers and co-founder of the so-called Polish school of electroacoustic music and author of innovative solutions of spatial sound projection, composer of Skalary (1966). He was also author of one of the first poliversional tracks to tape in the world, and the first Polish track quadraphonic Vox Humana (1968) carried out in Studio WDR in Cologne. His work has defined and confirmed the role of sound producer as a co-author of the works of electroacoustic music.

As a composer Rudnik created almost 100 works in studios of electronic music in Warsaw, Stockholm, Cologne, Paris, Bourges, Baden-Baden, Brussels and Ghent. They were presented on various radio stations throughout Europe and in many countries, as well as at many festivals in Warsaw, Wrocław, Finland, Zagreb, Stockholm, Berlin, Paris, Arles, and other sites. In 2006, he was a central figure in Warsaw edition of Audio Art Festival. His composition Homo Ludens was presented in 1985 at the prestigious world exhibition of contemporary art Documenta VII in Kassel.

== Awards and honours ==
He won many awards. In addition to the ones already mentioned, they include one at the First International Electronic Music Competition for "Dixi" (1968), first prize at the Bourges International Electroacoustic Music Competition (France) for Mobile (1972), third prize in Bourges for Ostinato (1973), second prize in Bourges for Homo Ludens (1984).

He was named Chairman of the Committee on Radio and Television "for his outstanding achievements in the field of creativity and execution of experimental electronic music for programs of Polish Radio and Television". He received the Warsaw Golden Badge of Honour for services to Warsaw (1987), an honorary radio award at the Festiwal Mediów "Człowiek w zagrożeniu" in Łódź for the "eternal and universal values of the human being documenting the threats of modern civilization" (1991), the Euphonia d'or prize in Bourges, also for Mobile, the Golden Microphone Award for "valued worldwide achievements in the field of radio art and experimental autonomous music" (1993) and the first prize (shared with Maria Brzezińska) at the XVII Międzynarodowy Katolicki Festiwal Filmów i Multimediów in Niepokalanów, and at the "Dwa Teatry" festival in Gdańsk for Przyjaciółki z Żelaznej ulicy (2002).

In 2000 he was awarded the Knight's Cross of the Order of Polonia Restituta. On 27 October 2012, at the Soundedit Festival, Rudnik received Człowiek ze Złotym Uchem award for "pioneering work in the field of music production". He died on 24 October 2016, four days before his 84th birthday.

== Works ==
- 1965 – Kolaż
- 1965 – Korzeń
- 1965 – Lekcja
- 1966 – Skalary – studium technologiczne
- 1967 – Dixi
- 1968 – Metamorfoza – muzyka ilustracyjna
- 1968 – Vox Humana
- 1969 – Rondo
- 1970 – My
- 1971 – Divertimento
- 1972 – Mobile
- 1972 – Mobile (wersja czterokanałowa)
- 1973 – Ostinato
- 1973 – Ready made
- 1973 – Wokale
- 1974 – Etiuda monotematyczna
- 1974 – Muzyka baletowa
- 1974 – Nature morte avec l’oiseau (wersja czterokanałowa)
- 1974 – Nature morte avec l'oiseau
- 1974 – Ostinato (wersja czterokanałowa)
- 1974 – Ring
- 1974 – Ring II
- 1975 – Gołębie Warszawy (nagranie czterokanałowe)
- 1975 – Nokturn
- 1976 – Cztery poematy
- 1977 – Ready made'77
- 1978 – Polak melduje z kosmosu
- 1979 – Etude de l'aspirine parisienne
- 1979 – Moulin diabolique
- 1979 – My
- 1979 – Nous
- 1979 – Omagio all'anonimo
- 1980 – Tryptyk – pamięci Franco Ewangelisty
- 1982 – Berceuse
- 1982 – Elegia – ofiarom wojny
- 1982 – Elegy to the victims of the war
- 1984 – Ekecheiria – szkic do portretu Mistrza
- 1984 – Homo ludens – balet radiowy nie pozbawiony elementów autobiografii
- 1984 – Kamienne epitafium – pamięci księdza Jerzego Popiełuszki
- 1984 – Szkic do portretu Mistrza
- 1986 – Podzwonne – pamięci Andrzeja Markowskiego
- 1989 – Gilotyna – dg
- 1990 – Annus miraculi
- 1990 – Via crucis – epitafium poświęcone pamięci polskich oficerów zamordowanych w kwietniu i maju 1940 przez NKWD i pogrzebanych we wsi Katyń koło Smoleńska
- 1992 – Pan Jezus niewierzących
- 1992 – Ptacy i ludzie – etiuda koncertowa na czworo artystów, troje skrzypiec, dwa słowiki, nożyczki i garncarkę ludową
- 1994 – Panichida – pamięci Jerzego Bienieckiego
- 1995 – Annus mirabilis
- 1995 – Diewuszka, wasze dokumienty
- 1995 – Interludia
- 1995 – Przyjaciółki z Żelaznej ulicy – radiowa ballada dokumentalna
- 1995 – Sekunda wielka – mała suita dokumentalna dla dorosłych
- 1995 – Theme G-M-E-B
- 1997 – Divertimento
- 1997 – Martwa natura z ptakiem, zegarem, strzelcem i panną
- 1997 – Pourqoi Cocteau – epitafium na śmierć Wielkiego Aktora George'a Genicot
- 1997 – Rumor
- 1998 – Homo radiophonicus – radiowa ballada dokumentalna
- 1999 – Jesień Ludów
- 1999 – Peregrynacje Pana Podchorążego albo nadwiślańskie żarna – radiowa ballada dokumentalna
- 2001 – Die Wandlung des Herrn Fähnrich oder die Mühlsteine an der Weichsel - Eine dokumentarische mehrsprachige Rundfunk Ballade
- 2002 – Śniadanie na trawie w grocie Lascaux
- 2004 – Agonia pastoralna
- 2004 – Johna pamięci rapsod frywolny
- 2004 – Manewry albo Dama i huzary – liryczny poemat dźwiękowy lub dźwiękowy poemat liryczny
- 2005 – Ecce homo
- 2005 – Epitafium – zamęczonym w kamiennym piekle Gross Rosen
- 2007 – Epilogos
- 2007 – Neomobile
- 2008 – Larum – „Dlaboga, co się stało z Wami Żołnierze?”
- 2010 – Dzięcielina pałała na taśmę

== Bibliography ==
- Archives of Bolesław Błaszczyk 2008;
- G. Michalski; Eugeniusz Rudnik, in: Ruch Muzyczny nr 7, 1970,
- J. Bieniecki: Bajadery Eugeniusza Rudnika, in: Teatr Polskiego Radia, nr 1, 1997,
- D. Mazurowski; Z E.R. rozmowa niesymetryczna, in: Estrada i Studio, nr 1, 2, 2000.
- A. Beksiak; The Erotically Audacious Electronic Eugeniusz, on: Culture.pl, November 2012. Retrieved 29-05-2014
- F. Lech; ERdada for tape – Eugeniusz Rudnik, on: Culture.pl, May 2014; retrieved 29-05-2014
