= Ambrose Field =

British composer

Ambrose Field is a British composer. Field’s music is characterised by lush, harmonic sound worlds and evocative vocal textures. It connects both ancient and contemporary approaches to composition, often drawing inspiration from visual cultures. The influence of medieval forms and process is audible in his current music, yet this is combined with a sound world informed by spectralism, room acoustics, and the possibilities offered by live electronics.

== Works ==
- Aqueduct Zero
- Geosphere
- Grey Sky Traffic
- Till
- Expanse Hotel (first performed at the ICMC in China, 1999)
- One Hell of a place to lose a cow
- UK weather
- Storm! (on Sargasso Records)
- Being Dufay, 2009 (choral works by medieval composer Guillaume Dufay set to electronic music).

== Prizes ==
- Prix Ars Electronica honourable mentions; 1997, 1998 and 2006
- Electroacoustic tape music without instrument, 2003 Bourges Competition.
- Laureate, 30e Concours International de Musique et d'Art Sonore Electroacoustique (2004)

== Samples online ==
- Storm! (2 tracks)
- Being Dufay (1 track)
