= Society for Electro-Acoustic Music in the United States =

American nonprofit organization

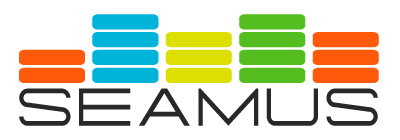
- Formation: November 9, 1984; 41 years ago
- Founded at: California Institute of the Arts
- Type: Nonprofit
- Tax ID no.: 95-3968749
- President: Mark Vaughn
- Website: seamusonline.org

The Society for Electro-Acoustic Music in the United States (SEAMUS; /ˈʃeɪməs/ SHAY-məs) is a nonprofit US-based organization founded in 1984 that aims to promote the performance, creation, and research of electro-acoustic music in the United States. SEAMUS comprises composers, performers, and teachers of electroacoustic music and is known for its annual conference, which provides a venue for the presentation and performance of electro-acoustic music from around the world. The organization was formed in 1984 as a U.S. chapter of the International Confederation of Electroacoustic Music (ICEM) which had been formed 2 years prior in Bourges, France. The U.S. representative to ICEM, Jon Appleton, suggested to composer Barry Schrader the formation of such a chapter in 1983 and the inaugural meeting was held at the California Institute of the Arts in November 1984. Significant supporters have included CalArts, ASCAP, and The Alexander Family Foundation.

== Publications ==
- Music from SEAMUS
- Journal SEAMUS
- SEAMUS Newsletter

== Lifetime Achievement Award ==
The SEAMUS Lifetime Achievement Award (formerly the SEAMUS Award) acknowledges the important contributions of its recipients to the field of electroacoustic music. The recipient is selected by the Board of Directors of SEAMUS. The prize was first awarded in 1987.

== See also ==
- List of electronic music festivals
