= Natasha Barrett (composer) =

British composer (born 1972)

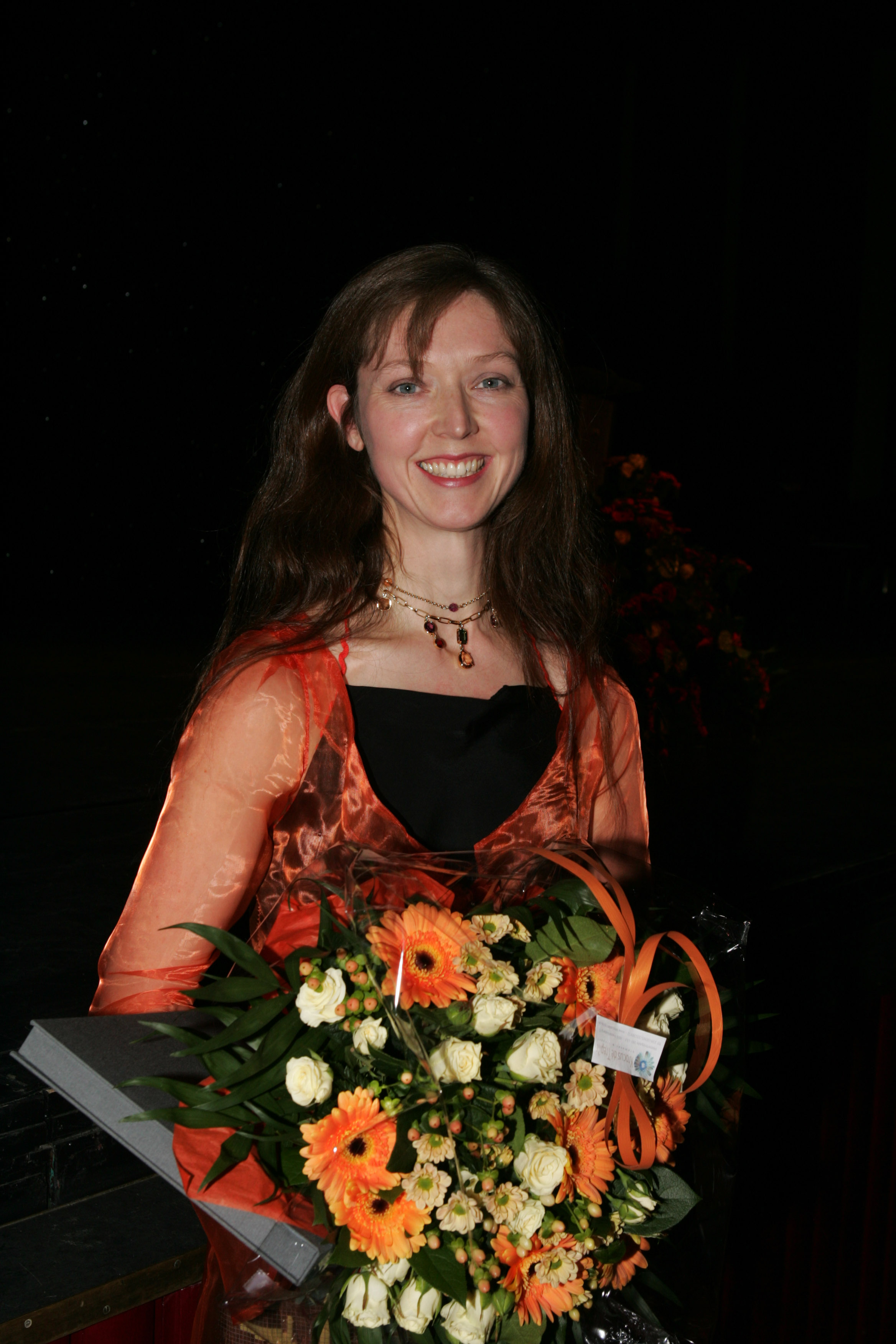
- Born: March 1972 (age 53–54); Norwich, England
- Occupations: Composer and performer of electroacoustic music

Natasha Barrett (March 1972, Norwich, England) is a British contemporary music composer specialising in electroacoustic art music. Her compositional aesthetics are derived from acousmatic issues. In addition to acousmatic concert music, she composes for instruments, live electronics, sound installations, multi-media works including digital video art, real-time computer music improvisation, has made soundscapes for exhibitions, and music for contemporary dance and theater. Her work has been influenced by spatialisation as a musical parameter, and the projection of 3-D sound-fields. Since 2020, she has expanded her repertoire to include works for large orchestra and electronics, as well as interactive real-time computer graphics. She currently lives in Norway.

Natasha Barrett began her studies in electroacoustic music while completing a master’s degree in analysis and composition under the guidance of Jonty Harrison at the University of Birmingham (UK). This study also gave her the opportunity to work with BEAST (Birmingham ElectroAcoustic Sound Theatre) which influenced her later work, and lead on to a doctoral degree in composition supervised by Denis Smalley, awarded in 1998 at City University (London, UK). Both degrees were funded by the Humanities section of the British Academy. In the same year, a grant from Norges forskningsråd (The Research Council of Norway) enabled her to work for one year as a resident composer at NoTAM (Norsk nettverk for Teknologi, Akustikk og Musikk / Norwegian network for Technology, Acoustics and Music) in Oslo (Norway). She is now a freelance composer, sound-artist and researcher, based in Oslo.

As of 2025 her work has received 35 international awards, including the Nordic Council Music Prize for 2006, the Giga-Hertz Prize, Germany (2008), the first prize at Musica Nova (Prague, Czech Republic, 2001), Noroit-Léonce Petitot (Arras, France, 1998), first prizes (1998 and 2001) and finalist (2008) in the Trivium section of the Bourges International Electroacoustic Music Competition (France), Euphonie D'Or des Concours International de Musique Electroacoustique, Bourges 1992–2002, Jury and public first prizes in the 9th Prix international Noroit-Léonce Petitot, Arras, France (1998). , finalist in the same competition in 1995, Musica Nova Electroacoustic Music Competition, Czech Republic (2001). Concurso Internacional de Música Eletroacústica de São Paulo (IV CIMESP, Brazil, 2001), Concours SCRIME (France, 2000), Festival Internacional de Nuevas Tecnologías, Arte y Comunicación Ciber@RT / Ciber@RT International Festival of New Technologies, Art and Communication (Spain, 2000), Concours Luigi Russolo (Italy, 1998, 1995), an honorary mention at Prix Ars Electronica (Linz, Austria, 1998), 9th International Rostrum for electoacoustic music (2002) and Edvardprisen (2004) Norway.

She receives commissions from festivals and performers throughout the world, and her work is available on numerous CD labels.

In addition to composing, she is joint director and performer in the spatial music performance group EAU (Electric Audio Unit) has worked as a researcher in 3-D music and movement at the Department for Musicology, University of Oslo (2014–2016) has worked as a 20% researcher in sound design at the Oslo School of Architecture (2011–2014) as associate professor in electroacoustic music and music technology at the Music Conservatory in Tromsø (2000) and has held a professorship at the Norwegian State Academy for Music (2016-2023), and several guest professorships in Scandinavia.

== Partial discography ==
- Toxic Colour (CD, Persistence of Sound, 2025, UK)
- Reconfiguring the Landscape (CD, Persistence of Sound, 2023, UK)
- Heterotopia (LP, Persistence of Sound, 2022, UK)
- Leap Seconds (CD, Sargasso, 2021, UK)
- Puzzlewood (CD, Aurora, 2017, Norway)
- Peat + Polymer (double CD, +3DB, 3DB 021, 2014, Norway)
- Bouteilles de Klein (DVD-a empreintes DIGITALes, IMED 10104/105 2010, Canada)
- Black Bile Extempore (Barrett & Östersjö) (CD, Elektron, EM 2012, 2009, Sweden)
- DR.OX (CD, C74 Records, C74 013, 2008, USA)
- Trade Winds (SACD, Aurora, ACD 5056, 2007, Norway)
- Kraftfelt (DVD-Audio, Aurora, ACD 5037, 2005, Norway)
- Isostasie (CD, empreintes DIGITALes, IMED 0262, 2002, Canada)
- Chillies & Shells (CD, Nota Bene Records, NB 970101M, 1998, UK)
- Rocks & Wraiths (CD, Nota Bene Records, NB 970101M, 1997, UK)

Her work also appears as tracks on twelve other CDs.

== Partial list of works ==
- Sagittarius A* (30’00). Violin, live electronics and 3-D sound. (2017)
- He Slowly Fell and Transformed into the Terrain (24’00). Acousmatic. 6th order 3-D higher-order ambisonics. (2016)
- Traversing a Small Town at Night (16'00). 6th order 3-D higher-order ambisonics, bass, alto, C and piccolo flutes, and live electronics. (2016)
- We are not alone (continuous). Installation, science-art collaboration. 6th order 2-D higher-order ambisonics, Wave Field Synthesis (WFS), ultrasonic sound beam, glass, bioluminescent bacteria, interactive electronics. (2015)
- Topology Chamber 2 (14'00). Acousmatic 5th order 3-D higher-order ambisonics. (2015)
- Topology Chamber 1 (12’00). Acousmatic live performance 5th order 3-D higher-order ambisonics. (2015)
- Volvelle 1 (20'34). Acousmatic 5th order 3-D higher-order ambisonics. (2015)
- Allure and Hoodwink (17’00). Piano, violin, electroacoustic sound and live electronics. (2014)
- Flammepunkt (15’00). 5.1 outdoor multi-media work. (2014)
- Flammepunkt sound garden. 22 x 4-minute stereo loops. (2014)
- The Oslo Sound Space Transport system II (OSSTS II). Interactive sound-art installation collaboration. 5th-order 2-D ambisonics, video, interactive motion technologies. (2014)
- OSSTS Route no.1 (22’38). Acousmatic soundwalk. B-format / stereo. (2014)
- Sound Exposure in Peru (33’00). Acousmatic sound-walk. B-format / stereo. (2014)
- A Soundwalk through Shanghai (8’35). Acousmatic sound-walk. B-format / stereo. (2014)
- Music and sound design to OSV: 4-hour production of Johan Harstad’s play OSV. (2013)
- A Collector’s Chest (26’00). For septet, electroacoustic sound and live electronics. (2013)
- Hidden Values. (21’00). Acousmatic 7th-order 3-D higher-order ambisonics and Wave Field Synthesis. (2012)
- Untitled-3 (14.30). Acousmatic 3rd order higher-order ambisonics and binaural. (2011).
- Aftershock (continuous). Four-part sound-art exhibition (2011)
- Animalcules (5’00). Acousmatic 5.1. (2010)
- Reality and Secrets no. 2 (18’00). Acousmatic hybrid higher-order ambisonics. (2010)
- Untitled-1 (4’50). Acousmatic 1st order higher-order ambisonics. (2010)
- Untitled-2 (7’43). Acousmatic 1st order higher-order ambisonics. (2010)
- Crush-2 (continuous). Interactive sound-art installation. Ambisonics loudspeaker array, motion ensors. (2010)
- Kernel Expansion (14’26). Acousmatic hybrid higher-order ambisonics. (2009)
- Deconstructing Dowland (9’00). Guitar and live electronics. (2009)
- The Gardens of Dreaming (continuous): Collaboration and music for the computer animation stallation of Marianna Selsjord. (2009)
- Rhizaria – Barely: part_IV (13’00). Cello and live electronics. (2008)
- Gentle Sediment – Barely: part_III (10’00). Multi-channel acousmatic. (2008)
- Sub Terra (16’11). Acousmatic 3rd order 2-D higher-order ambisonics concert work and installations. (2008)
- Barely: parts I and II Sound-art installation in collaboration with OCEAN design research association. Multi-channel / mixed media. (2008)
- Zone-1 (16’00). Piano, clarinet, percussion and live electronics. (2007)
- Rite-4/18 (4'00). Acousmatic, stereo. (2007)
- Microclimates III-VI (22’00). Acousmatic 3rd order 2D higher-order ambisonics concert work and installations. (2007)
- Crack Process (14’00). Percussion, trumpet, electric guitar, live electronics. (2006)
- Mobilis in Mobili (8’00). Acousmatic concert work, 3rd order ambisonics. (2006)
- Trade Winds (52’00). Acousmatic concert work, 3rd order ambisonics (2006)
- Hommage a Parmerud (15'24). Acousmatic concert work. 5.1. (2005)
- Abemolpas (Avoid being eaten by mimicking other less palatable species) (13'00). 3rd order 3-D higher-order ambisonics. (2004)
- Where shadows pass for bodies stand (14'00). Guitar and live electronics. (2004)
- Adsonora (continuous). Permanent, public space interactive installation. (2004)
- Exploratio Invisibilis (28'00). Acousmatic 3rd order higher-order ambisonics. (2003)
- Symbiosis (17'00). Cello and live electronics. (2002)
- Prince Prospero's Party (16'05). Acousmatic 5.1. (2002)
- The fetters of a dream (14'30). Acousmatic 5.1. (2002)
- Agora (60’00). Electroacoustic sound, soprano, theatre, spatial architecture. (2002)
- Angels & Devils (From Agora). (12'30). (2002)
- Boundary Conditions (continuous). Collaboration, sound and architectural interactive installation. 002)
- Push-me-Pull-me (7'00). Cello, violin, live electronics. Interactive work designed for schools. (2001)
- Industrial Revelations (12'50). Acousmatic. (2001)
- Rain Forest Cycle (continuous). Installation. (2000)
- Ras (10'00). Percussion quartet and live electronics. (2000)
- Utility of Space (14'00). Acousmatic hybrid higher-order ambisonics. (2000)
- Three Fictions (12'30). Acousmatic, stereo. (2000)
- Displaced:Replaced-I and –II (continuous). Interactive installations collaborations with real-time video and photo montage. (2000)
- Circadian Cycles (20'00). Sinfonietta and live electronics. (1999)
- Viva la Selva! (17'30). Acousmatic, stereo. (1999)
- Embryonic (continuous). Installation music for the computer animation installation of the late Marianna Selsjord. (1999)
- Liquid Crystal (12'20). Clarinet and live electronics. (1999)
- Diabolus (11'20). Percussion, voice and live electronics. (1999)
- Outspan (5'20). Acousmatic, stereo. (1998)
- Mimetic Dynamics (continuous). Interactive sound, video and physical media, collaboration. (1998)
- Microclimate II: Red Snow (15'40). Acousmatic, stereo. (1998)
- Microclimate I: Snow & Instability (17'00). Double bass, alto flute, mixed percussion and live electronics. (1998)
- Buoyant Charm (25'30). Revised 2001. Ensemble and live electronics. (1997)
- Little Animals (12'40). Acousmatic, stereo. (1997)
- Surf (9'50). Two classical guitars and live electronics. (1997)
- St Paul's Descending into the Autumn mist (2'35). Acousmatic, stereo. (1997)
- Racing Unseen (20'20). Acousmatic, stereo. (1996)
- Racing Through, Racing Unseen (3'00). Acousmatic, stereo. (1996)
- Earth Haze (13'54). Acousmatic, stereo. (1995)
- Swaying to See (14'99). Acousmatic, stereo. (1995)
- Imago (14'30). For cello, clarinet and live electronics. (1995)
- Puzzle Wood (13'20). Acousmatic, stereo. (1994)
