= Hellenic Electroacoustic Music Composers Association =

The Hellenic Electroacoustic Music Composers Association (HELMCA), founded in 2002, is the only national association of electroacoustic music in Greece. It is registered as a nonprofit organization (act. 1059.91/2001). Its members are active composers and sound artists who creatively use advances in music technology, producing a variety of musical forms of sonic art in their work. The main aim of HELMCA is to strengthen the collaboration and solidarity among its members and to promote electroacoustic music in Greece and abroad.

HELMCA became the official Greek federation of the International Confederation of Electroacoustic Music (CIME/ICEM) in June 2006, and it is the national member of the IREM (International Rostrum of Elactroacoustic Music, a part of UNESCO).

== Aims ==
Among the future aims of HELMCA are:

- Development of the sonic arts in Greece
- Promotion of sonic art in Greece, Europe and worldwide
- Strengthening collaboration and solidarity
- Protecting ethical and financial interests

Previous aims have been realized by:

- Hosting cultural and scientific events
- Educational activities and initiatives
- Development of infrastructure for encouraging artistic and scientific research
- Publications
- Promotion and communication
- Participation in national and international artistic and scientific festivals, conferences and competitions

== Members ==
Among HELMCA members are: Panos Amelidis, Dimitris Bakas, Dimitris Barnias, Penelope Bekiari, Anargyros Deniozos, Andy Dhima, George Dousis, Costis Drygianakis, Minas Emmanouil, Sofia Emmanouilidou, Thanasis Epitideios, Epameinondas Fassianos, Costas Frantzis, Stelios Giannoulakis, Nickos Harizanos, Ioannis Kalantzis, Georgia Kalodiki, Dimitris Kamarotos, Nikos Kanelakis, Dimitris Karageorgos, Orestis Karamanlis, Konstantinos Karathanasis, Phivos-Angelos Kollias, Vasilis Kokkas, Panagiotis Kokoras, Marinos Koutsomichalis, Theodoros Lotis, Apostolos Loufopoulos, Stelios Manousakis, Luc Messinezis, Andreas Mniestris, Andreas Monopolis, Marios Moras, Ioannis Panagiotou, Dimitris Papageorgiou, Aki Pasoulas, Maria Pelekanou, Thanos Polymeneas-Liontiris, Vasilis Roupas, Dimitris Savva, Yiorgis Sakellariou, Georgia Spiropoulos, Georgia Spyridopoulou, Nikos Stavropoulos, Giorgos Stefatos, Kostas Stratoudakis, Dimitris Talarougas, Philippos Theocharidis, Stelios Tsiloglou-Ignatiadis, Katerina Tzedaki, Nikolas Valsamakis, Stefanos Vassiliadis, Tim Ward, Haris Xanthoudakis, Agapi Zarda and Stelios Zoumadakis.

== Activities ==
Many of HELMCA's activities are part of international partnerships and collaborations:

- ICEM CD recording with HELMCA participation, France 2008
- Festival Synthèse, Bourges, France 2008
- CIME-AMEE concert, Valencia, Spain 2008
- HELMCA concert at SARC, Belfast 2008
- RTP - Música Contemporãnea, Portugal 2008
- ICEM + Elevkonsert på IDKA Kulturkiosken, Sweden 2008
- Participation at the International Rostrum of Electroacoustic Music, Lisbon, Portugal 2007
- Participation at the 15th Audio Art Festival, Kraków, Poland 2007
- CEMAT (Centri musicali attrezzati – Federation of Italian Electroacoustic Music Centers) international series of electroacoustic music, Rome, Italy 2006
- Festival Synthèse, Bourges, France 2006

== Electroacoustic Music Days ==
Electroacoustic Music Days
- Genre: Electronic music, electroacoustic music
- Location: Greece
- Years active: 2002-present
- Founders: Hellenic Electroacoustic Music Composers Association

The Electroacoustic Music Days festival, held annually, is the association's most important event where members meet, exchange ideas and present their latest work in a series of concerts. Every year it is organized in a different city and so far, it has been hosted in Corfu, Rethymnon, Lixouri, Ioannina and Athens. The works are presented with an acousmonium loudspeaker orchestra. The festival has been held continuously since 2002 and is one of the longest-running electroacoustic music festivals internationally.

- Ioannina 2025
- Athens 2024
- Rethymno 2023
- Corfu 2022
- Ioannina 2021
- Rethymno 2020
- Athens 2019
- Corfu 2018
- Rethymno 2017
- Liksouri 2016
- Corfu 2015
- Rethymno 2014
- Corfu 2013
- Lixouri 2012
- Rethymno 2011
- Corfu 2010
- Lixouri 2009
- Rethymno 2008
- Lixouri 2007
- Corfu 2006
- Rethymno 2005
- Corfu, 2004
- Corfu 2003
- Corfu 2002

== See also ==
- List of electronic music festivals
- Live electronic music
- Electronic art music
- Sound art
- Experimental music
