= Birmingham ElectroAcoustic Sound Theatre =

Sound diffusion system

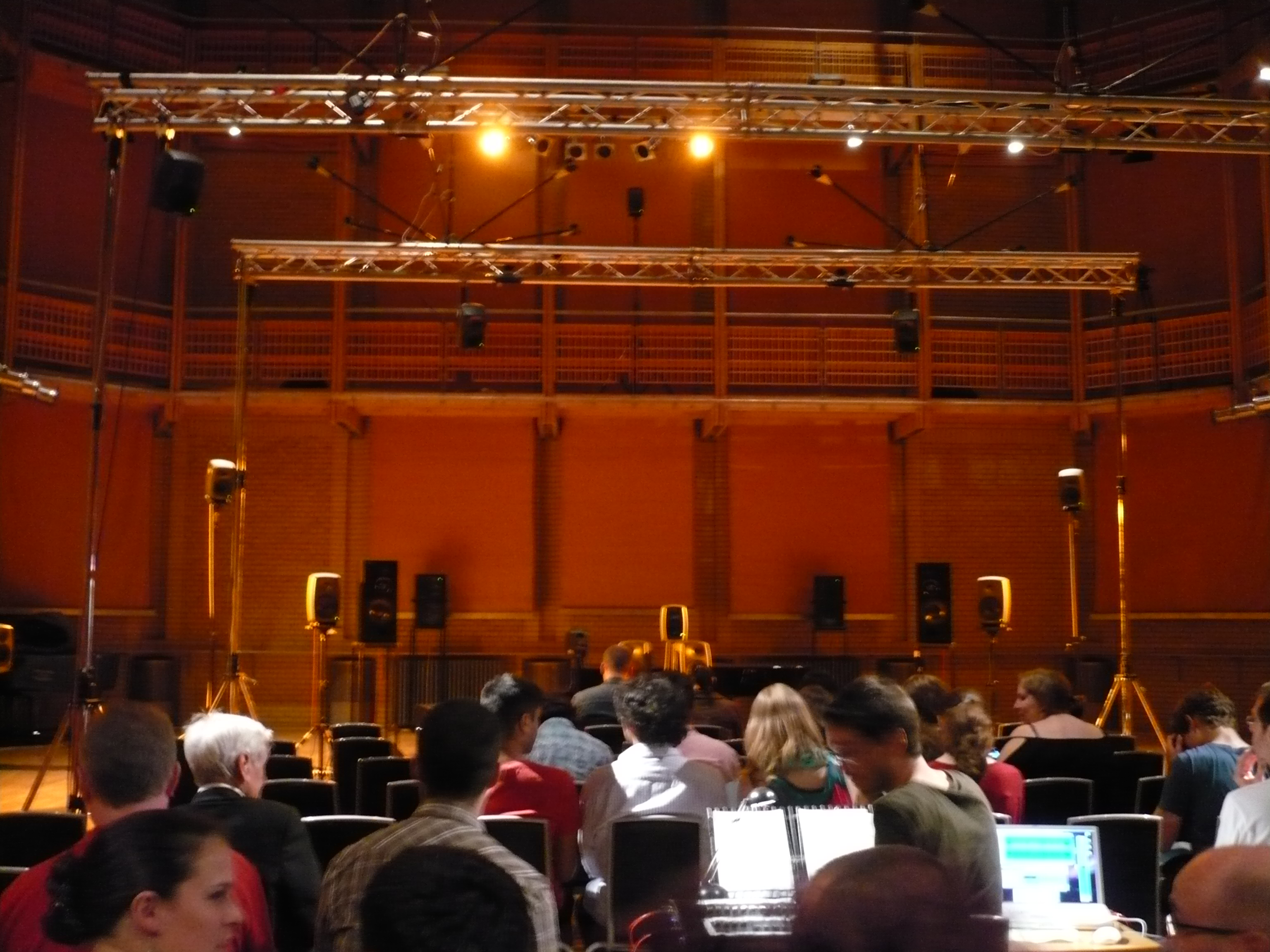
Performance by BEAST at the CBSO Centre in 2009.

Birmingham ElectroAcoustic Sound Theatre, or as it is more commonly known, BEAST, is a sound diffusion system specifically designed for the performance of electroacoustic music. It consists of a set of loudspeakers connected to a computer, usually controlled by a diffusion console. It is a long-running project of the Electroacoustic Music Studios at the University of Birmingham, founded in 1982 under the directorship of Jonty Harrison. Since 2014 BEAST has been directed by Scott Wilson, with Annie Mahtani as co-director from 2020. James Carpenter was technical director until 2018. The current technical director is Simon Smith.

== The loudspeakers ==
BEAST can consist of up to over 100 channels of loudspeakers, often arranged largely in pairs or rings, and includes ultra-low frequency loudspeakers (bins) and custom-built trees of high frequency speakers (tweeter trees) which can be suspended above an audience.

BEAST was originally designed as an acousmonium-style system for the diffusion of stereo work. The minimum set-up that BEAST would ordinarily use for stereo diffusion comprises a set of loudspeakers which Jonty Harrison terms the Main Eight. These four pairs of loudspeakers, using BEAST nomenclature, are termed Main, Wide, Distant and Rear. The Main and the Wide speakers together form the main, frontal sound image, the Main speakers being placed to act somewhat like the stereo loudspeakers in a typical studio, and the Wide speakers acting to stretch that sound image out across the audience's sound stage. The Rear speakers, which are behind the audience, provide immersion and the possibility of movement around the audience. Finally, the Distant speakers, which are positioned to hold their image behind the Main speakers, create a sound whose perspective is distant to that of the Main pair. Other speakers are added to this Main Eight to allow additional possibilities for sound movement and differing sound perspectives. More recent work with BEAST has explored the possibilities offered by 'massively multichannel' approaches to composition, and 'n-channel' work.

== The diffusion console ==
BEAST is a dynamic system: during a performance the performer operates an often custom-built console, called the diffusion console, with which they can individually and dynamically control the level of each loudspeaker, or groups of loudspeakers. This enables him or her to actively articulate the piece's implied spatial sound detail within the real space of the performance venue, in order to realise and interpret the composer's intentions. The system also includes equipment for the live processing of sounds so that, for instance, the sounds of a live violinist can be processed and incorporated into the soundstage.

The BEAST diffusion console has developed significantly over the years. The earliest systems depended on those commercially available mixing desks which had direct outputs from each fader. The stereo input signal from, for example, a tape-machine was split passively into the input channels on the desk, alternating left and right. The direct output from each channel fed the amplifiers for the loudspeakers, thus giving the individual control of each loudspeaker required for diffusion. The main disadvantage of this system was that it offered very little flexibility, making it difficult to move between sources in different formats (for example, quadraphonic, octaphonic or pieces with live input). In some situations complicated rewiring would be required for each source format used, which could be prone to errors particularly during the stress of a performance.

The first custom built console BEAST developed was still based on a commercially available mixing desk, but which had been extensively modified, adding a matrix input section and balanced outputs. The matrix input section allowed a number of inputs to be assigned to any fader input using a series of push buttons. Where multiple sources were used during a concert, this allowed each work to have their assignment preset on the matrix. BEAST's positive and negative experiences with this experimental desk led them to design a new one: their last analogue desk, called the 3D. This was a fully custom built console with an extensive matrix input which was very easy and flexible to use.

With the electroacoustic community's renewed interest in multichannel formats, and in particular octaphonic set-ups, came the need for BEAST to address how such pieces should be diffused. The diffusion of multichannel formats was too complex a task for the standard BEAST console, even the 3D, and BEAST turned to software solutions to solve these problems: first MAX/MSP and most recently, a system created in SuperCollider by Scott Wilson and Sergio Luque. Now, rather than using an analogue desk, a digital multichannel sound interface is used, and controlled via specially written applications using MIDI faders. This offers the maximum flexibility, with one fader, for example, being able to control only one loudspeaker, a stereo pair or an octaphonic circle depending on how the system has been configured. Using this system, multiple octaphonic groups, placed in different positions around the audience, can be used to diffuse octaphonic source material in a manner similar to that used for stereo. In this case, each fader controls one octaphonic group. A new set of three fully digital desks, using the Open Sound Control protocol, were made for BEAST by Sukhandar Kartadinata based on his GLUI platform. Clones of these desks have been adopted by other users and systems.

== Performances ==
Since its debut in December 1982, BEAST has performed hundreds of concerts in the UK and Europe, both on its own and in joint performances with musicians from all over the world. BEAST has appeared at many notable festivals and concerts, including the Edinburgh International Festival, the Inventionen Festival in Berlin, Hello Digital, Huddersfield Contemporary Music Festival, Multimediale 2 in Karlsruhe, in the Purcell Room and the Royal Festival Hall, The Royal Conservatoire in The Hague, the Adrian Boult Hall in Birmingham and the Henry Wood Hall in Glasgow. It was acclaimed when used as the concert sound system at the 1990 International Computer Music Conference held in Glasgow, and at the Aspekte Festival in Salzburg.

== See also ==
- Acousmonium
- Surround sound
- Sargasso Records
