= Włodzimierz Kotoński =

Polish composer (1925–2014)

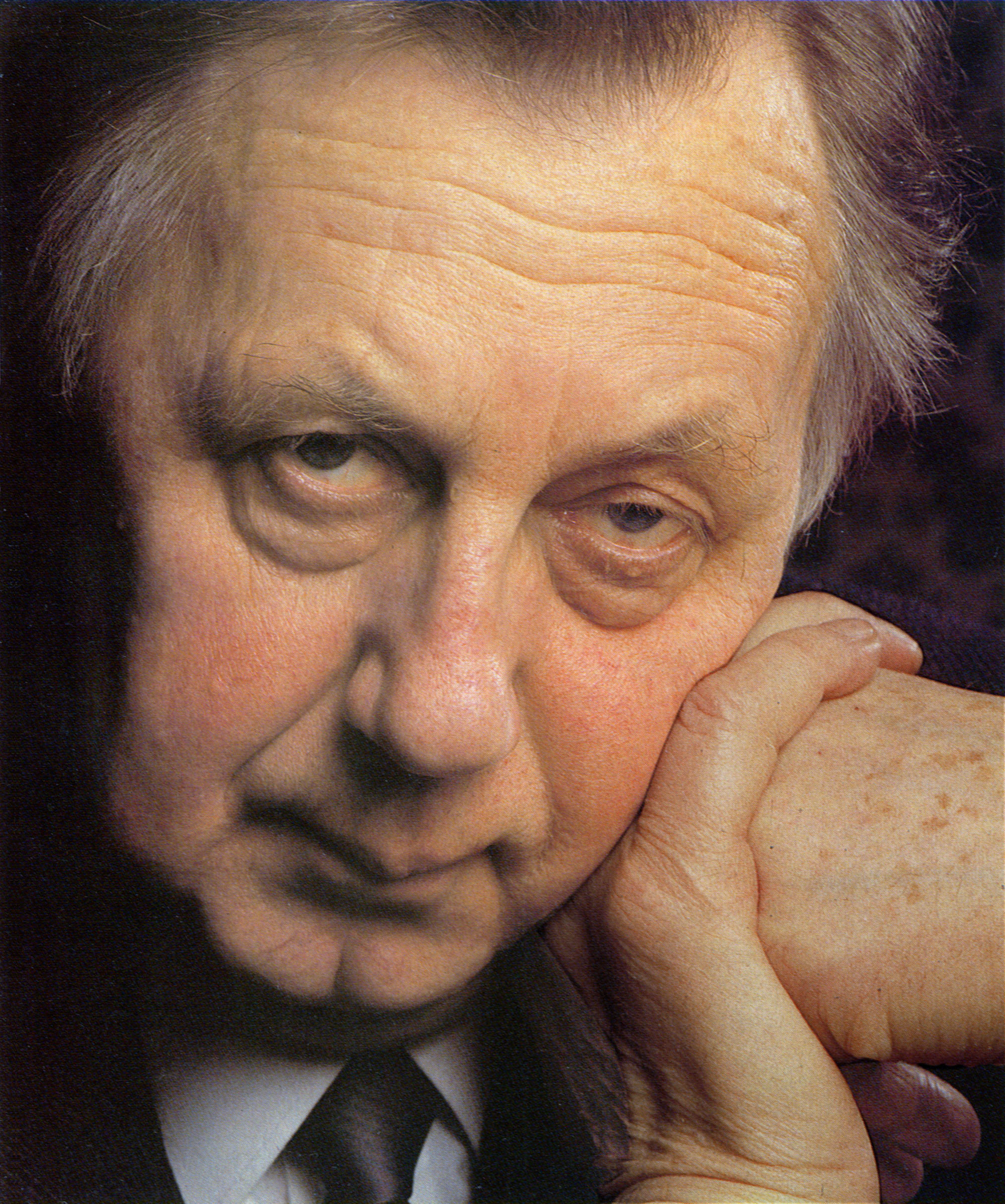
- Born: 23 August 1925; Warsaw, Poland
- Died: 4 September 2014 (aged 89); Warsaw, Poland
- Occupation: Composer

Włodzimierz Kotoński (23 August 1925 – 4 September 2014) was a Polish composer.

== Biography ==
Born in Warsaw, Kotoński studied there with Piotr Rytel and Tadeusz Szeligowski at the PWSM, graduating in 1951. In an initial period of activity he took an interest in folk music from the Podhale region in southern Poland. After attending the Darmstädter Ferienkurse in 1957–61, he adopted punctual serialism in works like Sześć miniatur ('Six Miniatures') for clarinet and piano of 1957 and Muzyka kameralna ('Chamber Music') for 21 instruments and percussion in the following year. This trend culminated in 1959 in Musique en relief for six orchestral groups. His Etiuda na jedno uderzenie w talerz ('Study on One Cymbal Stroke') was the first Polish piece of electronic music, created at Polish Radio's Experimental Studio. He also worked in various electronic music studios abroad, amongst others in Cologne, Paris, Freiburg, and Berlin.

In 1967 he was appointed lecturer in composition at the Frédéric Chopin Music Academy in Warsaw, where he also directed the electronic music studio. Notably, he wrote the first book in Polish on the field of electronic / electroacoustic music.

In the years 1974–1976 he was head music editor at the Polskie Radio and head music director for the Polish Radio and Television. In the years 1980–1983 he was vice president, and in 1983–1989 president of the Polish Section, International Society for Contemporary Music (ISCM). He presented guest lectures in composition and electroacoustic music at foreign universities in, amongst others, Stockholm, Buffalo, Los Angeles, and Jerusalem.

His students included: Jacek Grudzien, Jarosław Kapuściński, Krzysztof Knittel, Konstancja Kochaniec, Stanislaw Krupowicz, Owen Leech, Hanna Kulenty, Pawel Mykietyn, Pawel Szymanski. See: List of music students by teacher: K to M#Włodzimierz Kotoński.

He died in Warsaw at the age of 89 on 4 September 2014.

== Compositions ==
- Poemat, for orchestra (1949)
- Tańce góralskie [Highlander Dances], for orchestra (1950)
- Quartettino, for 4 horns (1950)
- Preludium i passacaglia, for orchestra (1953)
- 6 miniatur, for clarinet and piano (1957)
- Muzyka kameralna, for 21 instruments and percussion (1958)
- Etiuda na jedno uderzenie w talerz [Study on 1 Cymbal Stroke], for tape (1959)
- Musique en relief, cycle of 5 miniatures for 6 orchestral groups (1959)
- Concerto per quattro, for piano, harpsichord, guitar, harp, and orchestra (1960, rev. 1965)
- Trio, for flute, guitar, and percussion (1960)
- Canto, for ensemble (1961)
- Selection I, for clarinet, alto saxophone, tenor saxophone, and guitar (1962)
- Mikrostruktury, for tape (1963)
- Musica per fiati e timpani (1963)
- Monochromia, for oboe (1964)
- Pezzo, for flute and piano (1964)
- Wind Quintet, for flute, oboe, clarinet, bassoon, and horn (1964)
- A battere, for percussion, guitar, viola, violoncello, and harpsichord (1966)
- Klangspiele, for tape and sound-distribution (1967)
- Pour quatre, for clarinet, trombone, violoncello, and piano (1968)
- Muzyka na 16 talerzy i smyczki [Music for 16 Cymbals and Strings] (1969)
- Aela, for tape (1970)
- Multiplay, for 2 trumpets, horn, 2 trombones, and tuba (1971)
- Concerto for Oboe (+ oboe d’amore), Live Electronics, and Orchestra (1972)
- Harfa Eola [Aeolian Harp], for soprano, alto recorder, autoharp, guitar, and electric organ, all with amplification (1973)
- Musical Games, for 5 performers (1973)
- Promenada I, instrumental theatre for 4 performers (1973)
- Promenada II , instrumental theatre for 3 synthesizers, clarinet, trombone, and violoncello (1973)
- Skrzydła [Wings], for tape (1973)
- Róża wiatrów [Wind Rose], for orchestra (1976)
- Muzyka wiosenna [Spring Music], for flute, oboe, violin, and synthesizer or tape (1978)
- Bora, for orchestra (1979)
- Pełnia lata [Midsummer], for clarinet, violoncello, piano, and live electronics (1979)
- Sirocco, for orchestra (1980)
- Pieśń jesienna [Autumn Song], for harpsichord and tape (1981)
- Terra incognita, for orchestra (1984)
- Sceny liryczne, for 9 performers (1986)
- Tableaux vivants dans un jardin à l’anglaise, for synthesizer and tape (1986)
- Tlalocl, for harpsichord and percussion (1986)
- Ptaki [Birds], for clarinet, violoncello, and piano (1988)
- Cadenze e arie, for guitar (1988)
- Antiphonae, for tape (1989)
- Bucolica (Morton Feldman in memoriam), for solo flute (alto flute in G and flute in C) (1989)
- Trzy etidy rytmiczne [Three Rhythmic Studies], for piano (1990)
- La gioia, for 9 stringed instruments or string orchestra (1991)
- Tierra caliente, for tape (1992)
- Motu proprio, 4 pieces for bassoon and piano (1992)
- Seven Haiku (Bashõ), for female voice, recorder, oboe, clarinet, and harp (1993)
- Concerto for Electric Guitar and 11 Instruments (1994)
- Symphony No. 1 (1995)
- Podróż zimowa [Winter Journey], for flute, oboe, clarinet, violin, violoncello, harpsichord, and tape (1995)
- Concerto for Violin and Orchestra (1996)
- Mijikayo, for Japanese instrumental ensemble (1996)
- Speculum vitae, for orchestra and tape (1996)
- Trzy pieśni niemieckie do tekstów Josepha von Eichendorffa i Dursa Grünbeina [Three German Songs on texts by Joseph von Eichendorff and Durs Grünbein], for baritone and guitar (1997)
- Trzy pieśni do słów Dursa Grünbeina [Three Songs on Words by Durs Grünbein], for baritone and guitar (1997)
- Northern Lights (Aurora Borealis), for amplified harpsichord and tape (1998)
- Sextet, for flute, oboe, clarinet, bassoon, horn, and piano (1998)
- Zmienne struktury [Variable Structures], for clarinet, trombone, and piano (2000)
- Symphony No. 2 (2001)
- String Quartet No. 1 (2002)
- Wilanowskie pejzaże [Wilanów Landscape], for flute and string quartet (2002)
- Concerto for Clarinet and Orchestra (2002–2003)
- Madrygały polskie [Polish Madrigals], for soprano and instrumental ensemble, on verses by old Polish poets (2004)

== Writings ==
- "Uwagi o muzyce ludowej Podhala" [Notes on the Folk Music of Podhale], Muzyka, 4, nos. 5–6 (1953): 3–25; 4, nos. 7–8 (1953): 43–58; 4, nos. 11–12 (1953): 26–45; 5, nos. 1–2 (1954): 14–27.
- Góralski i zbójnicki [Highlander and Bandit Dances]. Kraków: Polskie Wydawnictwo Muzyczne, 1956.
- Instrumenty perkusyjne we współczesnej orkiestrze [Percussion instruments in the modern orchestra] Polskie Wydawnictwo Muzyczne, 1963. Second edition, Kraków: Polskie Wydawnictwo Muzyczne, 1981.
  - Hungarian trans. by Zsolt Molnár, as A modern zenekar ütöhangszerei Budapest: Zenemükiadó, 1967.
  - German trans. by the author, as Schlaginstrumente im modernen Orchester . Mainz: Schott, 1968.
  - English trans. by Daria Semegen, as Percussion Instruments in the Contemporary Orchestra. Kraków: Polskie Wydawnictwo Muzyczne, 1968.
- "La musique à la Radio Polonaise". La musique en pologne 2, no. 10 (1974): 3–15.
- Muzyka elektroniczna. Kraków: Polskie Wydawnictwo Muzyczne, 1989. ISBN 83-224-0372-0
- "Heterofonia: Stara technika w nowych zastosowaniach" [Heterophony: An Old Technique in a New Application]. In Sesja naukowa na temat: Twórczośċ kompozytorów wrocławskich (1945-1985). Zeszyt naukowy: Akademia Muzyczna im. Karola Lipińskiego we Wrocławiu, no. 46 edited by Walentyna Węgrzyn-Klisowska, and Maria Passella. Wroclaw: AM, 1990.
- Leksykon współczesnej perkusji Kraków: Polskie Wydawnictwo Muzyczne, 1999. ISBN 83-224-0490-5
