= Andrzej Dobrowolski =

Polish composer (1921–1990)

- Born: September 9, 1921; Lwów, Poland (now Ukraine)
- Died: August 8, 1990 (aged 68); Graz, Austria
- Era: Contemporary; 20th Century Classical

Andrzej Dobrowolski (September 9, 1921 – August 8, 1990) was a Polish composer and teacher. He studied at the Warsaw Conservatoire during the war and afterwards in the State High School of Music in Kraków. He went on to teach theory and, later, composition in Kraków and then Warsaw at the State Higher School of Music, becoming a Professor at the University of Music and Performing Arts in Graz in 1976, where he taught composition and electronic music.

Dobrowolski was one of the first Polish composers to concentrate on music for tape, and one of the first to pioneer the combination of pre-recorded tape and live performers. He was one of the first composers to use the Experimental Studio of the Polish Radio in Warsaw, which was founded in 1958.

== Sources ==
- Casken, John. 2001. "Dobrowolski, Andrzej". The New Grove Dictionary of Music and Musicians, ed. S. Sadie and J. Tyrrell. London: Macmillan.
- Thomas, Adrian. 2005. Polish Music since Szymanowski. Music in the Twentieth Century. Cambridge and New York: Cambridge University Press. ISBN 0-521-58284-9
- Andrzej Dobrowolski in MoMa's post online resource devoted to art and the history of modernism in a global context
