= Jonty Harrison =

English music composer (born 1952)

Jonty Harrison is an electroacoustic music composer born 27 April 1952 in Scunthorpe, and currently living in Birmingham, England.

== Career ==
Jonty Harrison studied with Bernard Rands at the University of York, graduating with a DPhil in Composition in 1980. Between 1976 and 1980 he lived in London, working at the National Theatre (where he produced the tape components for many productions, including Tamburlaine the Great, Julius Caesar, Brand and Amadeus) and City University. In 1980 he joined the music department of the University of Birmingham, where he was Professor of Electroacoustic Composition, as well as Director of BEAST (Birmingham ElectroAcoustic Sound Theatre) and the Electroacoustic Music Studios; for ten years he was Artistic Director of the department's annual Barber Festival of Contemporary Music. He has played an active role in musical life, making conducting appearances with the Birmingham Contemporary Music Group (most notably conducting Stockhausen's Momente in Birmingham, Huddersfield and London), the University New Music Ensemble and the University Orchestra (most recently in Stravinsky's Le sacre du printemps and Vic Hoyland's Vixen). He was a board member of Sonic Arts Network (SAN) for many years (and Chair between 1993 and 1996). He has also been on the Council and Executive Committee of the Society for the Promotion of New Music and was a member of the Music Advisory Panel of the Arts Council of Great Britain.

As a composer he has received several prizes and mentions in the Bourges International Electroacoustic Music Awards (including a Euphonie d'or for Klang in 1992 cited as one of the most significant works in the Bourges competition's history), two Distinctions and two Mentions in the Prix Ars Electronica (Linz, Austria), First Prize in the Musica Nova competition (Prague), a Lloyds Bank National Composers' Award, a PRS Prize for Electroacoustic Composition, an Arts Council Composition Bursary and research grants from the Leverhulme Trust and from the Arts and Humanities Research Board.

Commissions have come from many leading performers and studios, including two each from the Groupe de recherches musicales (Ina-GRM, Paris) and the Institut international de musique électroacoustique de Bourges (IMEB – formerly the Groupe de musique expérimentale de Bourges), the International Computer Music Association (ICMA), MAFILM/Magyar Rádió (Budapest), IRCAM/Ensemble intercontemporain (Paris), the BBC, Birmingham City Council, the Birmingham Contemporary Music Group, the Fine Arts Brass Ensemble, the Nash Ensemble, Singcircle, John Harle, Beverly Davison, Harry Sparnaay, and Jos Zwaanenburg. Despite renouncing instrumental composition in 1992, he wrote Abstracts, a work for 8-channel tape and large orchestra, in 1998. His 60-minute multi-channel piece Going/Places was premiered at the Huddersfield Festival in November 2015.

His music is performed and broadcast worldwide, and several works are available on empreintes DIGITALes, SAN/NMC, Cultures électroniques/Mnémosyne Musique Média, and CDCM/Centaur.

== Works ==
- Postcards Home (2017)
- Going/Places (2015)
- Afterthoughts (2007)
- Undertow (2007)
- Free Fall (2006)
- Internal Combustion (2005–06)
- Rock 'n' Roll (2004)
- Streams (1999)
- Splintering (1997)
- Surface Tension (1996)
- Unsound Objects (1995)
- Sorties (1995)
- Hot Air (1995)
- ...et ainsi de suite... (1992)
- Aria (1988)
- Klang (1982)
- EQ (1980), soprano saxophone, and tape
- Pair / Impair (1978)

== Recordings ==
- Voyages (empreintes DIGITALes, IMED 07, 2016)
- Environs (empreintes DIGITALes, IMED 0788, 2007)
- Etc with Horacio Vaggione, Trevor Wishart (EMF, EMF 053, 2004)
- Évidence matérielle (empreintes DIGITALes, IMED 2052, 2000)
- Articles indéfinis (empreintes DIGITALes, IMED 9627, 1996)
