= BHW (disambiguation) =

BHW is a German bank.

BHW or bhw could also refer to:

- Barangay health worker
  - Barangay Health Wellness Partylist, a political organization for healthcare workers in the Philippines
- BlackHatWorld, an Internet forum about black-hat search engine optimization
- Bank Handlowy, a Polish bank
- Biak language, a language spoken in Indonesia, by ISO 639 code
- Bhagatanwala Airport, an airport in Sargodha, Pakistan; see List of airports by IATA airport code: B
- British Homing World, a British pigeon racing magazine
