= David Prior (musician) =

British sound artist and composer (born 1972)

- Born: 18 June 1972 (age 54)
- Origin: Ipswich, England
- Occupations: musician, artist, record producer, academic
- Website: davidprior.org liminal.org.uk

David Prior (born 1972 in Ipswich, United Kingdom) is a British sound artist and composer.

== Early work ==
David Prior was born in the UK and studied Music and Religious Studies at the University of Wales, Bangor where he studied composition with Andrew Lewis. He was awarded the prize for composition in his final year for his piece Dense which went on to win a Prix de Residence at the 1996 Bourges International Electroacoustic Music Competition , leading to a residency at Xenakis' UPIC studio in Paris the following year. The piece was short-listed by the Society for the Promotion of New Music (SPNM) and following a performance at the Purcell Room in 1998, it was selected by then SPNM artistic director Howard Skempton for the George Butterworth award.

From Bangor, Prior went on to study composition with Jonty Harrison at the University of Birmingham, graduating with a PhD in 2001. During his time in Birmingham, Prior's work was often concerned with integrating acoustic space as a compositional parameter in his work. This theme stimulated interests which still define the work he is involved in today, whether that be through his installations, sound-walks, acousmatic compositions or the sound designs he has made for museums and galleries. Another feature of the work Prior was producing during this period but less evident in more recent projects, was the attempt to assimilate free improvisation into the devising of his ultimately 'fixed' compositions, for example Somewhere Submarine (1996), for piano and tape (joint winner of the 1997 Cornelius Cardew Composition Competition) and Another Poisonous Sunset (1998).

Prior was awarded a Deutscher Akademischer Austauschdienst (DAAD) stipendium in 1999, funding a one-year residency at the Technische Universität Berlin, where he completed the work submitted for his PhD. Following the completion of his residency, he stayed living in Berlin, undertaking a commission from the DAAD Kunstlerprogram which led to his twenty-four channel acousmatic piece Love and Death, premiered at the Parochialkirche, Berlin as part of the Inventionen festival, 2000. In 1997, Prior collaborated with Swiss choreographers Jürg Koch and R. Lucia Baumgartner on the piece an die Materie and the music from this piece went on to win an honorary mention at the 1998 Bourges International Electroacoustic Music Competition and first prize in the 1998 EAR (Hungarian Radio) composition prize. When Koch went on to join CandoCo dance company, he worked with Prior again, commissioning him to write the score for Amaze in You in 2002.

== Liminal: sound and architecture ==
Prior first collaborated with architect Frances Crow in 1997 on Triptych, an installation jointly commissioned by SPNM and the Southbank Centre, London. They worked together again on the Arts Council funded Good Vibrations children's education project in 1999 but it wasn't until 2003 that they formally established Liminal, a design studio with a particular interest in exploring sound and architecture. The partnership has resulted in projects ranging from installations to sound-walks as well as commercial sound design and consultancy and a number of theoretical publications and conference papers. Liminal was formed as a company in order to undertake Swash (2003), a large-scale, immersive sound installation for Living Coasts in Devon and in keeping with other recent work, this piece has evolved into a number of different iterations. Two years after the completion of the installation version of Swash, Prior made an eight-channel, acousmatic concert version of the piece which was first performed at the Martin Harris Hall in Manchester as part of the Sonic Arts Expo, 2006. In 2007, Prior was commissioned by the SpACE-Net spatial audio research group in York to produce a third, improvised version of the work which has been performed a number of times subsequently. Following the completion of Swash, liminal were made lead sound designers for the Churchill Museum in London designed by celebrated designers Casson Mann. The Churchill Museum has gone on to win a string of awards and was nominated for both the D&AD Award for Outstanding Achievement in Digital Installations and the 2006 Gulbenkian Prize.

Since 2006, liminal have been involved as lead artists in the Warwick Bar development in Birmingham. Their work on this project involved close collaboration with masterplanning architects Kinetic-AIU and has since been cited as an exemplar for artist-architect collaborations by CABE, who part-funded liminal's involvement through their PROJECT fund and features as a case-study in their Artists & Places publication. It was during this project that liminal developed their use of the sound-walk as a research tool, in this instance consolidating the extensive research undertaken into the soundscape of the Warwick Bar site into a binaural walk available to the public. Liminal later contributed to the Cotswold Water Park's twenty-year strategic plan, working with masterplanning consultants Scott Wilson and building on the research techniques they developed for the Warwick Bar project on a series of proposals which address the soundscape of the water park. Liminal's recent work has focussed on the creation of 'listening spaces', whether this takes the form of a site-specific sound-walk, such as Black Water Brown Water (2008) or architectural interventions such as Song Pole with poet Larry Lynch (2008), the point of departure for these pieces is to create a reflexive listening experience for the audience; focussing attention back onto the act of listening itself.

In 2010 they were awarded £50,000 to create "The Organ of Corti" to 'recycle' and create new sounds.

== Other sound and music collaborations ==
Prior began working with New Zealander Dugal McKinnon in 1998 on a composed radio documentary Ways of Hearing for Resonance FM as part of John Peel's Meltdown festival at the Southbank Centre, London. The pair went on to form Arcades in 2000, slowly working towards their album Who's Most Lost? which was completed in late 2007. Meanwhile, Prior was also asked by UK songwriter John Matthias to produce two tracks on his Ninja Tune release Stories From the Water Cooler. Prior and Matthias went on to form Derailer, whose first project was to remix a track by Corker Conboy called Radiant Idiot. The resulting Radiant Idiot Remake, was chosen by American independent film-maker Harmony Korine for his Thornton's television commercial Stuck. The pair have remixed work by John Richards as well as working towards an album of original material. Prior also remixed John Matthias and Nick Ryan's Cortical Songs, released on the non-classical label. Prior has recorded and/or produced work for artists and ensembles including Icebreaker, Nicola Hitchcock and Michael Bassett as well as contributing sound designs to films by artists Jane Grant and Anya Lewin. In 2007, Prior was invited by improvising vocalist Steve Lewis to join Antti Sakari Saario in providing live electronics for his Flocking project based around an improvising ensemble. Since 2002, Prior has been working with his brother Andrew Prior on a series of collaborative music projects. Their piece Gem Sprinter features on the Yacht Club compilation release Pallomeri under the moniker Orlando Hooks.

== Films ==
Since 2002, Prior has made a series of short films often characterized by their brevity and simplicity. On a number of these films, Prior has collaborated with poet Larry Lynch, who as well as contributing texts often features in the films themselves. Their collaboration On What it Might Mean to be Spinning features the voice of poet John Hall and was premiered in February 2008 as part of the Voices III festival in Plymouth, UK. Prior's films have been screened across the UK, in Russia, Korea, China, Sweden, Holland and the USA.

== Awards ==
Prior's work has won prizes including a number of awards from the Bourges International Electroacoustic Music Competition, Cornelius Cardew Prize, E.A.R (the composition prize of Hungarian National Radio), the George Butterworth prize and a PRS ATOM award. Prior has received awards from the University of Birmingham Alumni award, M.J. West Foundation, the Arts Council of England, the Banff Centre for the Arts, the DAAD and UNESCO.

== Academic work ==
Prior began teaching in the music department at the University of Birmingham in the late 1990s while a post-graduate student there. Since 2001, Prior has been a lecturer, then senior lecturer in music at Dartington College of Arts, Devon. Prior has given guest lectures and presentations around the world at institutions including the Icelandic Academy of Arts, Reykjavík, Stadia Helsinki Polytechnic and ESMAE School of Music and Performing Arts, Polytechnic Institute of Porto.

== Personal life ==
Prior lives with Frances Crow in Totnes, Devon.
