= Pigeon whistle =

Noise-making device attached to pigeons

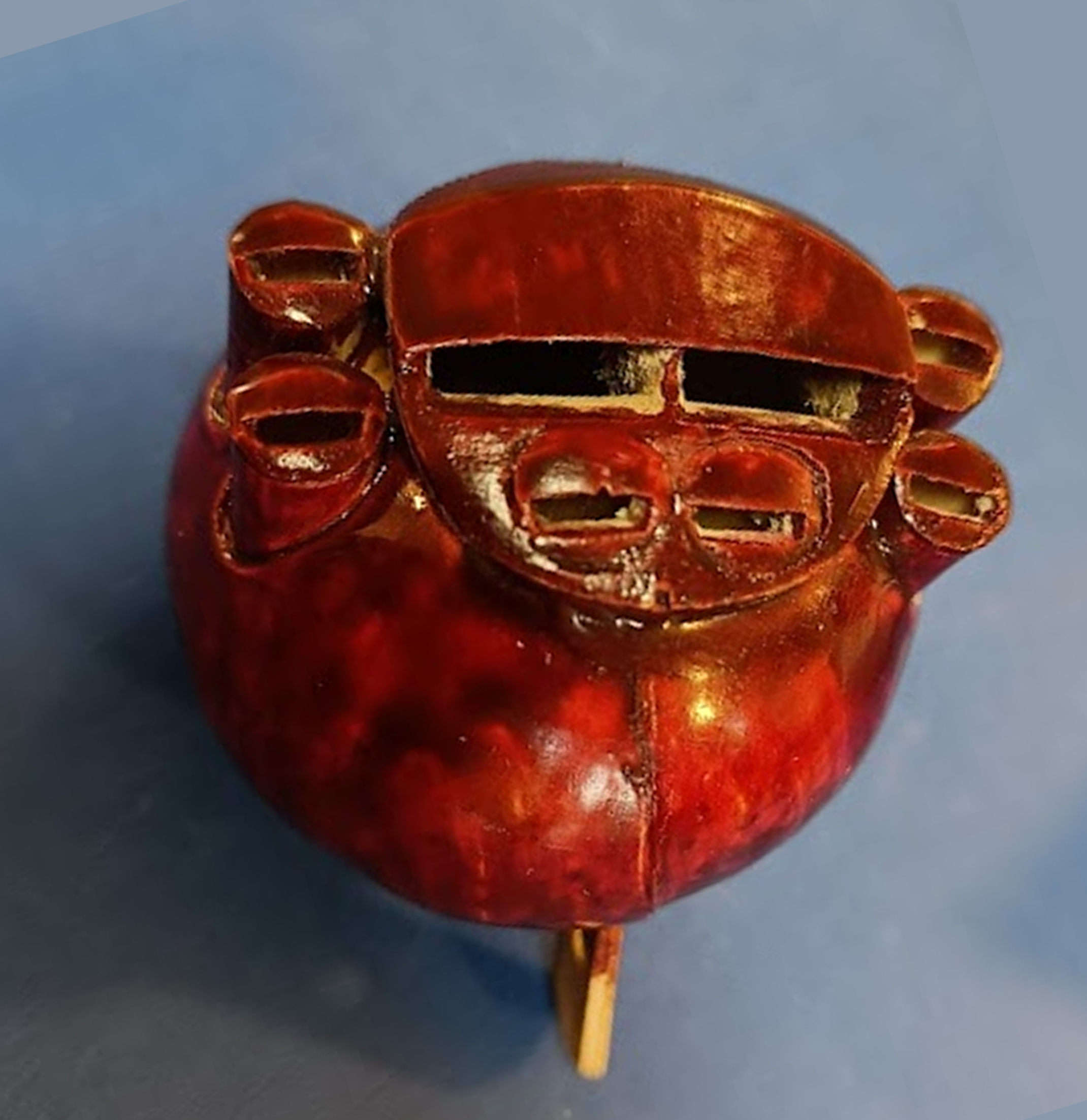
Pigeon whistle

A pigeon whistle (known as a geling 鸽铃 or geshao 鸽哨 in China) is a device attached to a pigeon such that it emits a noise while flying. They have long been used in Asian countries, particularly China for entertainment, tracking and to deter attack by birds of prey. The practice was once common but is now much less widespread owing to increasing urbanisation and regulation of pigeon keeping. A modern version of the device, based on specimens held at the Pitt Rivers Museum in Oxford, has been developed by musician Nathaniel Mann. Mann has performed with the devices attached to racing pigeons at festivals across the United Kingdom.

== Description and history ==
On pigeon whistles

[When] the birds fly the wind blowing through the whistles sets them vibrating, and thus produces an open-air concert, for the instruments in one and the same flock are all tuned differently. On a serene day in Peking, where these instruments are manufactured with great cleverness and ingenuity, it is possible to enjoy this aerial music while sitting in one’s room.

— Berthold Laufer, 1908

Pigeon whistles are small devices fitted to pigeons that emit a noise as the bird flies through the air. They have been used in China, where they are known as geling or geshao, since at least the Qing dynasty (1644–1912) and also in Japan and Indonesia. Traditionally they were made from lightweight bamboo or from gourds and attached to the pigeon by a toggle fixed between its tail feathers - causing no harm to the bird. They are used to deter birds of prey, for entertainment and as a means of an owner recognising their pigeons. They have been used in Taiwan on racing pigeons and may also have been used by the American Army. The carrier pigeons used by banking houses in Peking to carry reports were fitted with particularly intricate whistles carved with animal head designs and capable of emitting a number of different tones at once. During the 1986 visit of Queen Elizabeth II to China a flock of pigeons fitted with whistles was released in Tiananmen Square.

Owing to the progress of urban development and increasing regulation of pigeon keeping the sound of the pigeon whistle, commonly heard in cities before the 1990s, has become rare in modern China. Whilst in the 1970s there might have been 5–6 people in each street of Beijing keeping pigeons with whistles it is said to be rare to find even one person doing so in a whole district of the modern city. The modern practice has been documented by Colin Chinnery, a British consultant who has made sound recordings for exhibitions at a museum about traditional Beijing cultures in Dongcheng District. The Oxford-based Pitt Rivers Museum contains examples of traditional Chinese and Indonesian whistles (including one mounted on a taxidermy pigeon) as well as more modern types.

== Mann revival ==
Nathaniel Mann, composer in Residence at Pitt Rivers Museum in Oxford became interested in the museum's collection of pigeon whistles in the early 2010s. He had first come across them in a display cabinet in the early 2000s and his interest was piqued as he had no idea what sound they would make. He placed an advert in British Homing World, a pigeon racing magazine, looking for birds that he could attach whistles to, but received no response. The National Pigeon Association put him in touch with Pete Petravicius (known as "Pigeon Pete"), a pigeon racer. Upon first making contact Petravicius thought that Mann was a prank caller; however, the pair soon began a collaboration.

Mann first tried mounting some wooden whistles he had sourced from Java to the birds but these proved too heavy. He experimented with his own whistles made from ping pong balls, dog whistles and plastic egg shells before settling for a design made from a film canister, lolly sticks and old vinyl records. He has also experimented with 3D printed whistles. Mann's whistles are mounted to the birds by securing together two of their tail feathers and securing the whistle between them with a toggle. Petravicius is the only person in the United Kingdom to have trained pigeons to return to a mobile loft (his is mounted on a moped). This is essential to the performance as otherwise the birds would quickly return to their home loft, leaving the intended audience behind.

Petravicius' Birmingham Rollers are well suited to the task as they are able to make quick, acrobatic turns. The sound of the whistle varies depending on the movement of the wings, acceleration of the pigeon, wind speed, wind direction and the positions of pigeons within the flock. The effect of Mann and Petravicius' displays has been described as "unlike any other phenomenon", with Petravicius describing it as "rubbish on record but brilliant live". They have toured the performance to festivals across the country, initially for 15 minute performances but later for longer periods, with Mann accompanying the pigeons with folk songs. The audience is asked to lie down on the grass to experience the performance. Mann proposed a collaboration with American performance artist Baby Dee. The performance was premiered at the Brighton Festival in May 2013 and in 2014 won the Butterworth Prize for Composition.

== In Literature ==
- Summer with Pigeons, by Liu Haiqi / 刘海栖：《有鸽子的夏天》(2019)
