= Deutsche Postbank =

Branch of Deutsche Bank for retail banking

Postbank branch
- Type: Branch
- Industry: Financial services
- Founded: 1990
- Headquarters: Bonn, Germany
- Key people: Christian Sewing (Chairman)
- Products: Retail banking
- Revenue: ▼€3,194 million (2017)
- Net income: ▼€250 million (2017)
- Total assets: ▼€145,345 million (2017)
- Total equity: ▼€7,115 million (2017)
- Number of employees: ▼17,441 (FTE, 2017)
- Parent: Deutsche Bank (2018-present) (Through DB Privat- und Firmenkundenbank AG between 2018-2020)
- Capital ratio: ▼12.9% (Group CET1, December 2017)
- Website: postbank.de
- Footnotes in consolidated financial statement; source

Postbank (German pronunciation: [ˈpɔstbaŋk]; full name: Postbank – eine Niederlassung der Deutsche Bank Aktiengesellschaft, lit. 'Postbank – a branch of the Deutsche Bank joint-stock company') is a branch of Deutsche Bank for retail banking, which was formed from the demerger of the postal savings division of Deutsche Bundespost in 1990. Since May 2018, it has operated as a brand of Deutsche Bank's retail arm. It serves 13 million customers in around 1,000 branches and 700 advisory centers.

== History ==
The Postscheckdienst was introduced in 1909 by the German Empire establishing accounts for payment transactions by mail and linking postal and banking services in German states. In 1990, following the German Postal Services Restructuring Act (Poststrukturgesetz) of 1989, the German Postal Service (Deutsche Bundespost) was divided into three companies, Deutsche Post, Deutsche Telekom and Postbank. Later that year, Deutsche Post Postbank of the former East Germany was merged with Postbank. From 1990 to 1997, Günter Schneider was chairman of the board. The first board of Postbank consisted of Günter Schneider, Rudolf Bauer and Bernhard Zurhorst.

On 1 January 1995, following the new postal reform legislation (Gesetze zur Postreform II) of 1994, Postbank became an independent, joint stock company. Postbank then extended operations, and engaged in loans, insurance and homes savings. In 1999, Deutsche Post became the owner of Postbank. In that same year, Postbank acquired DSL Bank by the sale of the government's shares. Postbank subsidiary easytrade began offering on-line brokerage services in 2000. Postbank purchased BHF (USA) Holdings Inc. in 2001. By 2003, Postbank had 11.5 million customers, more than any other bank in Germany.

On 1 January 2004 the Postbank took over the transaction banking of Deutsche Bank and Dresdner Bank. From then on Postbank executed the clearing and settlement of Deutsche Bank and Dresdner Bank's payment transactions. This agreement strengthened the bank’s new business field "Transaction Bank" in the apron of the announced initial public offering. The IPO of Postbank on 23 June 2004 was the largest stock market launch in Germany for the past 2 years. Deutsche Post retained a controlling stake of 50% plus one share.

On 25 October 2005, Postbank announced its intention to acquire a 76.4 percent stake of the home financing specialist, Beamten-Heimstättenwerk (BHW). With the acquisition of BHW Deutsche Postbank became Germany’s leading financial services provider for retail customers. On 1 January 2006 the purchase of BHW Holding by Deutsche Postbank was concluded. Beyond that Deutsche Postbank took over 850 branches from Deutsche Post. Along with the change in ownership, around 9,600 employees switched employer, bringing Postbank's workforce to over 25,000 employees.

In September 2008, 30% of Postbank was sold to Deutsche Bank for €2.8 billion. In October 2010, Postbank put its Indian finance business up for sale. Deutsche Bank gained a majority stake in the firm through a tender offer completed in December 2010, and exercised its option to acquire the remainder of Deutsche Post's holding in 2012. In the end, the total purchase cost Deutsche Bank €6 billion. Since May 2018, Postbank has been merged with the DB Privat- und Firmenkundenbank as a subsidiary of Deutsche Bank. Employees' union officials of Postbank announced to stage a strike by some employees on 31 January 2022, demanding higher wage rates in order to meet the rising inflation.

== See also ==
- List of banks in Germany
