= Richard Causton (composer) =

British composer

Richard Causton (born 1971) is an English composer and teacher.

== Biography ==
Born in London, Richard Causton attended Quintin Kynaston School and William Ellis Schools. His early musical education took place at the ILEA Centre for Young Musicians, specialising in flute (though also playing piano and singing in choirs).

Causton studied at the University of York under Roger Marsh between 1990 and 1993. Having graduated with first-class honours, he took an M.A in composition the following year. He also undertook a Foundation Scholarship at the Royal College of Music, studying composition under Jeremy Dale Roberts and conducting under Edwin Roxburgh. In 1997, receipt of the Mendelssohn Scholarship enabled him to study electro-acoustic composition at the Scuola Civica di Musica. He has subsequently gone on to forge a consistent and productive career as a freelance composer and arranger.

As well as composing, Causton has taught at the Birmingham Conservatoire (alongside his former teacher Edwin Roxburgh), Wells Cathedral School, and the Royal College of Music, and was Fellow Commoner in the Creative Arts at Trinity College, Cambridge. He is currently Professor in Composition at Cambridge and a Fellow of King's College.

Causton founded the Royal College of Music Gamelan Programme. He is also a founding member of Ensemble Corrente and has been a panel judge for the SPNM (Society for the Promotion of New Music) composers shortlist. He occasionally writes feature articles on contemporary music for The Guardian.

== Work as composer ==
Causton is best known for his work in acoustic contemporary classical music. He first came to attention with The Persistence of Memory, which drew significant attention when premiered at the London Sinfonietta's 1995 'State of the Nation' Festival. He has been hailed as "a beguilingly gifted young composer" creating "moments of exquisite timbral sensitivity" (Robin Holloway in The Spectator), "nothing if not distinctive in his approach to composition" (www.classicalsource.com) and as "one of the finest of the new generation of British composers" (The Guardian). Causton's contemporary Julian Anderson (former Head of Composition at the Royal College of Music) has described him as being one of "the most original of his generation" and of possessing "exceptionally high standards of invention and imagination."

Causton's compositions are widely played and have been performed by the BBC Symphony Orchestra, BBC Scottish Symphony Orchestra, Basel Symphony Orchestra, CBSO, London Sinfonietta, Nash Ensemble, Sinfonia 21, Jane Manning, Barrie Webb, and the Composers Ensemble. In the United Kingdom, his work has featured at the Spitalfields Festival, the Cheltenham Festival, the Park Lane Group evenings, and the York Early Music Festival (the latter in association with the Accessible Arts Club as part of a theatrical project with disabled people). In December 2010, it was announced that Causton had been selected as one of twenty composers to participate in the New Music 20x12 project as part of the London 2012 Cultural Olympiad. Causton will compose a new work for the European Union Youth Orchestra to be premiered in 2012.

Although the majority of his compositions are written for standard orchestral instruments and ensembles, some of Causton's material has featured unusual instrumentation not commonly used in Western classical music (such as gamelan ensembles or homemade instruments). He has also experimented with compositions utilising unusually placed sound sources - his radical 2001 arrangement of the Sanctus from Guillaume de Machaut's Messe de Nostre Dame featured two instrumental groups separated as far as possible (a strategy which anecdotally once broke up a Sinfonia 21 rehearsal when a "burly, tattooed Fire Officer" took exception to one of the groups blocking a fire exit).

Causton has cited Pierre Boulez, Sir Michael Tippett, Karlheinz Stockhausen, Luciano Berio, György Ligeti, Olivier Messiaen, Elliott Carter, Carl Nielsen, and Igor Stravinsky as particular musical inspirations. He has also commented "as far as musicians and other composers are concerned, I find the music of the post-war period, the 1950s and 1960s, really exciting because it seems as if the rate of change in music was incredible. New techniques were being invented all the time, electronic music was just appearing and there were huge advances in all kinds of technical ways. I think it was a hotspot in musical history and perhaps things have slowed down a bit now."

In 2015, Causton was commissioned to compose a new carol to be premièred at the King's College service of Nine Lessons and Carols: The Flight was set to a poem by George Szirtes; Causton explained that he 'had a growing sense that at this precise moment it is perverse to be writing a piece about a child born in poverty, away from home and forced to flee with his parents, without in any way paying reference to the appalling refugee crisis that is unfolding. I phoned my friend, the poet George Szirtes to ask if he might be prepared to write me a poem which could encompass some of these ideas.'

== Scholarships and awards ==
Causton is a former holder of the prestigious Mendelssohn Scholarship (previous holders include Sir Arthur Sullivan, Sir Malcolm Arnold, Mark-Anthony Turnage, David Blake, Steve Martland, Martin Butler, and Brian Ferneyhough).

Causton has been the recipient of a growing list of awards. During his time at the Royal College of Music, he won two composition prizes - the Kit and Constant Lambert Prize and the Herbert Howells Prize. His 1993 solo piano work Non mi comporto male won the SPNM George Butterworth Award, and two years later in 1995, he was the winner of the first-ever Fast Forward composition award for Two Pieces for two clarinets. His second award of 1995 was from the 3rd International 'Nuove Sincronie' Competition for The Persistence of Memory. His impressionistic violin-and-piano duet Seven States of Rain won in the Best Instrumental Work category at the 2004 British Composer Awards. Most recently, Causton won the 2006 Royal Philharmonic Society Award for Chamber-Scale Composition for his ensemble piece Phoenix.

In October 2025 Causton was nominated for an Ivor Novello Award for his piece If I Could Tell You for piano trio.

== Comments on compositional process ==
In a 2006 interview, Causton revealed "I started composing quite early on - at the age of 8 or 9. I was already having flute lessons by then and I couldn't get over the fact that having learnt how to play the notes, you could put them together in any way you wanted to - not just play tunes written by other people."

Regarding his own approach to composition, Causton has remarked (in 2004) that "for me composition feels like a process of getting to know the new piece as I write it - a bit like feeling my way around a room with my eyes shut. As work progresses, the features of the piece become more and more apparent and towards the end, there's usually a phase of paring down/tightening up the piece... It's very unusual for a piece to reach its final shape in a single draft." He reiterated this in a 2009 interview, saying "It's really difficult starting a new piece. It feels a bit like being blindfolded and put in an unfamiliar room and feeling your way around. I've got absolutely no tricks or techniques which always work. An analogy would be an animal following a scent. You are trying to find something to hang on to; something that will pull you in a certain direction, and then the whole thing gathers momentum. So it's quite agonising and slow at the beginning and then it accelerates."

Causton has, however, referred to certain recurring compositional techniques that he uses: "There are sometimes specific techniques - such as accelerations/tempo relationships that I work out mathematically or little pieces using only 6 of the 12 semitones - but they tend to be solutions to localised problems rather than things I'd use again and again. I certainly have favourite types of harmony and habits of voice-leading, part-writing, and instrumentation, but that's not really the same thing...it's usually more intuitive and I work hard trying to 'feel my way' into a piece - and often towards the end find myself paring material away so that what remains feels quite tightly written."

Regarding his inspirations for individual compositions, Causton has said "I suppose in one sense they come from whatever I feel I need to do in a particular piece - currently, for example, I'm really letting my hair down and doing some things that not long ago I would have considered in bad taste. Sometimes my music draws on my own experiences - often physical things such as the feeling of touching down in an aeroplane, or having a high temperature and being delirious. But it could also be politics, visual art, poetry, photography, or even the weather. Ideally, there's a spontaneous coming together of musical and poetic ideas (and possibly a compositional technique) so that it's not forced; one thing invites the other."

== Works by Causton ==
- Threnody (for soprano, piano and two clarinets), 1991
- Light Breaks Where No Sun Shines (for soprano and ensemble), 1992 (revised 1994)
- Non mi comporto male (for solo piano - variations on "Ain't Misbehavin'" by Fats Waller) - premiered by Stephen Wolff at the Sir Jack Lyons Concert Hall, York, 27 May 1993 (winner: SPNM George Butterworth Award)
- Two Pieces for two clarinets - premiered 1995 (winner: Fast Forward composition award)
- Soliloquy (for solo bassoon), 1995
- The Persistence of Memory (for chamber ensemble) - premiered by Oliver Knussen and the London Sinfonietta at the South Bank Centre, 1995 (winner: 3rd International 'Nuove Sincronie' Competition)
- Notturno, premiered 1998 (revised 2001)
- Millennium Scenes (for large orchestra) - premiered by BBC Symphony Orchestra, 1999 (revised 2001)
- Rituals Of Hunting And Blooding (for septet ensemble) - premiered by the Nash Ensemble at the Purcell Rooms, 2000
- The Flea (for solo male voice - setting of the poem by John Donne) - premiered 2003
- Inventions in One Part (for piano) - premiered by Karl Lutchmayer at The Warehouse, London, 15 June 2001
- Concerto for Solo Percussion and Gamelan - premiered by Evelyn Glennie at the Cheltenham Festival, 2001
- Kyrie and Sanctus (arrangement of two movements from Guillaume de Machaut's Messe de Nostre Dame) - premiered 2001
- Seven States of Rain (for violin and treated piano) - composed for Darragh Morgan (violin) and Mary Dullea (piano) - premiered 2003 (winner: 2004 British Composer Awards - Best Instrumental Work category)
- Between Two Waves of the Sea (for orchestra and tape/sampler), premiered by the CBSO under Mike Seal at Symphony Hall, Birmingham, 2004
- Poems Almost of This World (for solo voice - settings of poetry from the Late T'ang) - premiered by Jessica Summers, 2005
- Jesu, Sweete Sone Dear (for choir and three soloists) - premiered by Caius College Choir, Cambridge, 2006
- Three Riddles (for three-part upper voice choir) - premiered by the New London Children's Choir, 2006
- Saraband/The Way the World Ends - premiered at the Aldeburgh Festival, 2006
- Phoenix (for quintet ensemble) - premiered by the London Sinfonietta, 2006 (winner: 2006 Royal Philharmonic Society Award - Chamber-Scale Composition category)
- Sleep (for solo flute) - premiered by Sebastian Bell (London Sinfonietta), 2006
- As Kingfishers Catch Fire (for septet) - premiered by the Britten Sinfonia, 2007, revised 2008
- Chorales (for 2 gamelan instruments) - premiered at Kettle's Yard, Cambridge, May 2008
- Snatch (for chamber ensemble) - premiered by Birmingham Contemporary Music Group, May 2008
- English Encouragement of Art (for soprano, mezzo-soprano & percussion - setting of a poem by William Blake) - commissioned for NMC Recordings's NMC Songbook; concert premiere by Claire Booth, Susan Bickley and Owen Gunnell at Kings Place, London, 1 April 2009
- Chamber Symphony - large ensemble piece commissioned by Birmingham Contemporary Music Group, premiered 16 October 2009
- 21 Piano Nocturne - piano ensemble piece (inspired by Frédéric Chopin's Nocturnes) performed by 21 pianists on 21 upright pianos, commissioned by The City of London Festival and the Polish Cultural Institute, London, premiered at the Guildhall Yard, London, on 21 June 2010 (incorporated with Play Me, I'm Yours public artwork program by Luke Jerram)
- Dark Processional - five-minute chamber orchestral piece based on Stabat Mater by Giovanni Battista Pergolesi, premiered at Kings Place, London by Orchestra of the Age of Enlightenment/London Sinfonietta, 16 October 2010
- Twenty-Seven Heavens - orchestral piece commissioned by the European Union Youth Orchestra. Premiered under the direction of Giananadrea Noseda at the Amsterdam Concertgebouw, 20 August 2012
- De Profundis - solo cello, premiered by Anssi Karttunen, 8 November 2014
- Night Piece - solo piano, premiered by Tim Horton, 18 January 2015
- The Flight - for SATB choir, premiered by King's College Choir/Stephen Cleobury as part of the Festival of Nine Lessons and Carols, 24 December 2015
- Between God & the Wall - for SATB choir, premiered by St Catharine's College Choir/Edward Wickham as part of the Music, Healing and Human Rights project, 14 March 2025

== Discography ==
- Millennium Scenes NMC D192, featuring Millennium Scenes (Nicholas Collon/Halle), Chamber Symphony (Ryan Wigglesworth/BCMG), As Kingfishers Catch Fire, The Persistence of Memory and Notturno (Gerry Cornelius/BCMG)
- A Land So Luminous Prima Facie PFCD051, featuring Threnody (Mary Bevan, soprano/Continuum Ensemble/Philip Headlam), Non mi comporto male, Night Piece (Douglas Finch, piano), Rituals of Hunting and Blooding (Continuum Ensemble/Philip Headlam) and Sleep (Lisa Nelsen, flute)
- Kate Romano, Contours, Metier, 92074 (2005) - Two Pieces for two clarinets (both parts performed by Romano)
- Darragh Morgan and Mary Dullea, Opera, NMC D108 (2006) - features Seven States of Rain
- London Sinfonietta, Jerwood Series Volume 4, London Sinfonietta label, SINF CD1-2008 (2008) - features Sleep and Phoenix
- Various Artists, NMC Songbook: Songs commissioned for the 20th Anniversary of NMC NMC D150 (2009) - features English Encouragement of Art
- Cradle Song recorded on Delphian DCD34075 (Choir of Gonville & Caius College, Cambridge/Geoffrey Webber), Regent REGCD413 (Choir of Guildford Cathedral/Katherine Dienes-Williams), Regent REGCD464 (Choir of Selwyn College, Cambridge/Sarah MacDonald) and Orchid Classics ORC100062 (Vocal Group Concert Clemens/Carsten Seyer-Hansen)
