= Bernardo Kuczer =

Argentine composer, music theoretician, and architect

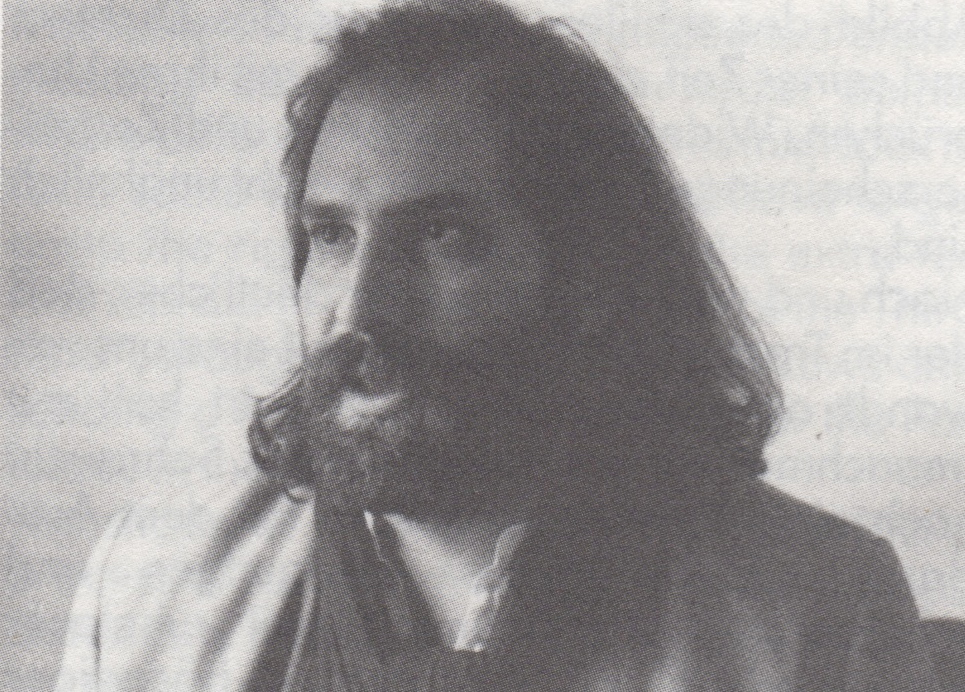
Bernardo Mario Kuczer

Bernardo Mario Kuczer (30 April 1955 – 22 June 2023) was an Argentinian composer, music theoretician and architect.

== Biography ==
=== Argentina ===
Bernardo Mario Kuczer was born in Buenos Aires, Argentina, on 30 April 1955. Until his early twenties, he was involved in rock music as composer and guitarist, also writing music for the theatre. Simultaneously, he studied architecture and graduated in 1978.

Through the study of the classical guitar with Hector Rocha and then with Jorge Panitsch he came into classical music. He studied harmony and musical analysis with Nestor Zadoff and then with Sergio Hualpa and later Renaissance counterpoint with Nestor Zadoff. He became a member of an interdisciplinary music investigation group, collaborating with psychologists, biologists, doctors and musicologists.

In 1979 he presented a thesis under the supervision of Sergio Hualpa with own ideas about "the Basic Components of Music, their multiple interrelations and a special kind of "energy" generated by their uni- and multidimensional dynamic interactions, an energy which determines and enables the micro and macro Articulation of the Music-stream". The thesis was first named: "La forma natural de la música" ("The natural ways of music"), then "The New Connections" and later "Música sin el Factor Humano" ("Music without the Human Factor").

=== Europe ===
In 1980, Kuczer went to London to study the viola da gamba, abandoning it shortly after for starting composition.

His first ensemble piece ("Even ... the loudest sky") (1981) for saxophone quartet, was selected by the British SPNM (Society for the Promotion of New Music) for the "composers' week-end", London 1981.

Kuczer arrived in Freiburg in 1983 to study composition with Brian Ferneyhough. He felt however very soon the need to continue his way in music alone.

In 1984 he was invited to participate of the "International Summer Courses for New Music" at Darmstadt, (Note: The invitation was made on behalf of Brian Ferneyhough, who had the chance to hear some of the pieces beforehand. In a letter to the organizers he wrote: "In my opinion these pieces... are partly of very great interest". And later: "... I consider him to be a major composer in this area". (Original German: "... Ich halte ihn für einen bedeutenden Komponisten in diesem Bereich...") Taken from a letter from Ferneyhough to the organizers of the Darmstädter Ferienkurse from 9 May 1984. While the (German) original stays at the IMD archive, a copy of this letter can be found at http://bernardomariokuczer.webs.com/apps/photos/photo?photoid=186151395.) where several pieces of his tape-cycle Civilización o Barbarie received a first performance and where he was awarded, as first Latin American composer, the "Kranichsteiner Musikpreis" (Kranichstein Music Prize).

In 1986, for the next edition of the Darmstadt Courses, he was invited to perform a second concert with works of his tape-cycle. (Note: During these summer courses, his piece A-gent's Arguum for solo viola, from 1982, was premiered. For this performance, mainly, the soloist, Barbara Maurer, received the Kranichsteiner Musikpreis for interpreters.)

Civilización o Barbarie (Note: The title is a paraphrase of the title of a book by the Argentine author and statesman Domingo Faustino Sarmiento, published in 1845: Facundo – Civilización y Barbarie – Vida de Juan Facundo Quiroga.) was later selected, as personal choice of the jury, by Klaus Huber (one of the three jurors), for the "World Music Days" of the ISCM (International Society for Contemporary Music) held in 1987 in Cologne.

During 1990 he was a stipendiary of the "Heinrich-Strobel-Stiftung" (Heinrich Strobel Foundation) of the broadcasting service Südwestrundfunk.

After 1999 he remained apart and distant to the active music and concert scene.

Since 2000, he has been working extensively with computers, designing, writing and developing his own computer programs. These programs, which are based on and are used to further research his personal hypotheses, models and theoretical ideas about harmony, rhythm, sound, musical form and "Music-Stream", have also been used to generate his latest digital, computer and algorithmic generated works.

At times and complementary to his main musical activities, Kuczer has been active in other fields of art. He has produced more than 1000 paintings, drawings, sculptures, as well as designed his own furniture. As a writer he has written some 250 poems and two (still unpublished) books, the title of the first one being: "Salvas de Guerra" (contra La Música)" ["War Salvos" (against Music)]. He also produced and musicalised an own documentary film: "Vida?"(por un Espacio Poético o una Poesía del Espacio-Tiempo), una documentación" ["Life?" for a Poetic Space or a Space-Time Poetry, a documentation].

== Work and performances ==
Kuczer's musical oeuvre comprises more than 81 (principal) works (with some 110 individual "named" pieces) covering different areas of music (e.g. instrumental music, tape music, electroacoustic music, computer music, algorithmic compositions and digital music).

More than 60 of his works have remained unperformed (and mostly unrevealed). Several of his instrumental pieces were and/or are still considered unplayable. His Saxophone Quartet (1981) was first regarded as unplayable until 1994, when it was given its first performance. (Note: This live performance by the XASAX Saxophone quartet, which occurred on 23 April 1994 and which is billed as the work's premiere in the CD's leaflet, was included in the "CD-Dokumentation Nº 2", from the Wittener Tage für Neue Kammermusik 1994, WDR Köln (wd 05/2). The same ensemble made a second studio recording of the work, for the record label hat[now]art, which is included in Xasax "Ars subtilior", Label Code: LC 6048.) (Note: More recently, in January 2014, the Fukio Ensemble played the piece at the Berlin University of the Arts, at the finals of the Felix Mendelssohn Bartholdi competition, where they were awarded the 1st prize in the category New Chamber Music.) Some of his works have been played and broadcast in various European cities and elsewhere.

Examples:

- London: „Composers' Weekend“, 1981
- Darmstadt: Darmstädter Ferienkurse, 1984 and 1986
- Como: „18° festival internazionale, autunno musicale“, 1984
- Milan: „Musica del nostro tempo“, 1987
- Freiburg: „Horizonte Reihe“, 1984
- Paris: „Perspectives du XXe siècle“ (Carte blanche à Harry Halbreich), 1985
- Stockholm: „International Festival of Electronic Music“, 1985
- Freiburg: „Aventure Freiburg“, 1987
- Mönchengladbach: „Ensemblia Festival“, 1987
- Cologne: Weltmusiktage der IGNM, 1987
- Frankfurt: Hessischer Rundfunk, 1989
- Los Angeles: Arnold Schoenberg Institute, 1990
- Witten: Wittener Tage für neue Musik, 1994
- Basel: IGNM Basel, 1995
- Piteå: Piteå University, 1995
- Bremen: Festival „Transit“ Orte/NichtOrte, 1999
- Montreal: World Saxophone Congress, 2000

=== Press reviews ===
... the real revelation of this disc is Argentinian Bernardo Maria Kuczer, whose "even ... The loudest sky!!" is one of the wildest things I've heard for some time. Brilliantly written (fiendishly difficult) and played with utter conviction, it makes you wonder what Kuczer's been up to since he wrote this back in 1981. Anything new by either Kuczer or [the saxophone ensemble] Xasax is welcome here.

On the 2 May 1996, Fara C. wrote in the music magazine World:

..., and " Even … The loudest sky!!! ", composed by the Argentine Bernardo Kuczer in 1981. This work reaches a summit of complexity such as it had never been played before the world creation of Xasax in 1994 ! Six months of hard work were necessary to the group to triumph over these supernatural seven minutes. A musical intensity which the quartet will make us share with crazy pleasure.

The Belgian musicologist Harry Halbreich wrote a review about the Darmstadt International Summer Courses of New Music 1984, published in the monthly magazine Le Monde de la musique:

However, the end of the evening had to be spent... in the company of the Argentinian Bernardo Kuczer living in Germany and some of his apocalyptic electroacoustic pieces grouped into an immense cycle under the title Civilización o Barbarie. I admit that I fled. But two days later I was able to hear again, at a somewhat more bearable volume level, these extraordinary pieces of music of a visionary madman, skinned alive, bleeding shreds of flesh of a prodigious expressive power, produced, paradoxically, with a simple cassette tape recorder!

== Work list ==
- Articulaciones II (1980), for two alto recorders (or two equal wind instruments), tuned at a quarter tone difference
- Seis estudios sobre la disonancia simple y la mixtura de lenguas (1980), for choir
- Huella (1981), for flute
- Dualidades (1981), for piano
- Drei'h (1981), for clarinet
- Even ... the loudest sky (1981), for saxophone quartet
- A-gent's Arguum (1982), for viola
- La Distancia IV (un fragmento) 1982–83, for flute, bass clarinet, violoncello and piano
- towards a New Brutality (1983), nine studies
  - Study Nº 1: (Historias Naturales), for percussion and (digital) Sound-Space (*)
  - Study Nº 2: (Soul-Lage), for voice in a Sound-Space (*)
  - Study Nº 3: (La vuelta al día Ia), for percussion (two roto-toms) (*)
  - Study Nº 4: (memorias de un pasado por suceder...) (1983), for two percussionists, voice, tape and electronices
  - Study Nº 5: (La vuelta al día II: de Spatium Natura), for Space-Percussion (*)
  - Study Nº 6 & 7: (Twin dances)
    - Nº 6 dance A, for percussion and (digital) Sound-Space (*)
    - Nº 7 dance B, for percussion and (digital) Sound-Space (*)
  - Study Nº 8: (El espejo y la lámpara I), for percussion (*)
  - Study Nº 9: (El espejo y la lámpara II), for voice and percussion (*)
- (*) revised in 2012, now existing only as digital version
- Civilización o Barbarie (1984), a cycle comprising the following 18 individual tape pieces:
  - Peripéteia II (1984), tape music
  - Peripéteia III (1984), tape music
  - Peripéteia IV (1984), tape music
  - Peripéteia V (1984), tape music
  - Peripéteia VI (1984), tape music
  - Peripéteia VII: Iña'K (1984), tape music
  - Peripéteia VIII: Periplo (1984), tape music
  - Une mémoire la vie (1984), tape music
  - Cri de la mémoire fermée (1984), tape music
  - Finale, ou la mémoire pulsante (1984), tape music
  - Contre-rime (1984), tape music
  - Him'l (1984), tape music
  - Dream-line (1984), tape music
  - One other desert (1984), tape music
  - Escenas-Miró (1984), tape music
  - Ejercicio de aire (1984), tape music
  - Hole the black (1984), tape music
  - ... und Stille daneben (1984), tape music
- K'tedral (1984–85) for viola
- formas y fluidos II–VII (1985) for piano
- Form-Memory (1986), tape music
- Memory-Form (1986), tape music
- Equations of change (1987), computer music
- In search of the Engram (1986–88, 89–90), for wind quintet
- Zeitschlag -Brücken (zer-)schlagen- (1991–2001), a cycle comprising the following 8 pieces (with possible amplification and/or electronic processing):
  - FORM I (1991–98), for viola, cello and 1 or 2 pianos or for cello and piano
  - FORM II (1991–98), for viola, cello and (1 or) 2 pianos
  - FORM III (1991–98), for viola and piano
  - FORM IV (1991–98), for viola, cello and 1 or 2 pianos
  - ZickZackZeit (1991–97), for violin
  - Zeit-Raum-Zerre II (1991–99), for cello
  - Zeit-Raum-Zerre III (1991–99), for viola and cello
  - Ziele umzingelnd (2000–01), for violin, viola and cello (String trio)
- Cosmografía -Panopticum Armonicum- (2002–04), for piano
- Sinfines (2002–04), for piano, piano four hands or two to five pianos
- La vuelta al día Ic (1983, 2000, 2006) (computer generated versions and scores), for 1, 2, 3, 4, 6 or 8 percussionists
- Resistencia de la materia (2011–12), a cycle comprising the following 5 independent digital works:
  - Tungsteno (2011–12), digital music
  - Casi Ayer (2011–12), digital music
  - Siglo XX: Un Respiro (2011–12), digital music
  - A-Sintaxis III (2011–12), digital music
  - Siglo XX, Pequeño Epitafio Nº2: Esmeril (2011–12), digital music
- Trenzados americanos (2011–12), digital music
- Drama de amar (2011–12), for digital percussion, digital music
- Malambo (2011–12), digital music
- Cuicantos (2011–12), for digital percussion ensemble, digital music (*)
- Sureña Ic (2012), for piano (*)
- (*) these pieces belong to the so-called Apócrifos americanos, a series of composer aided, computer generated studies
- Sendas negras (2012), for percussion ensemble
- Schwarmverhalten I (1986–2012), digital music
- Schwarmverhalten II (1986–2012), digital music
- Schwarmverhalten III (1986–2012), digital music
- Auf Wachstum und Gedeih (2012), digital music
- Máximos y Mínimos (en un Nanocosmos) (2012–13), a collection of 27 digital works
- Música de cámara Nº1 (algo oscura) (2013), digital music
- Música de cámara Nº2 (donde hubo fuego) (2013), digital music
- Juego de engranajes (2013), digital music
- Gris ardiente (2013), digital music
- Los Pasos Perdidos (2013), digital music
- Lo heterogéneo (2013–14), a cycle comprising nine independent digital works, belonging to four different groups:
  - Tres Hibridaciones (2013), a group of three independent digital works
    - Canticum Sacrum Non (2013), digital music
    - Formas nobles y melancólicas (2013), digital music
    - Tourdion (et basse) (2013), digital music
  - Una Decantación (2014), comprising a single independent digital work
    - Un sol menor (2014), digital music
  - Tres Aleaciones (2014), a group of three independent digital works
    - Stehe hier nicht still... (2014), digital music
    - Marcha plana (2014), digital music
    - Tres ceremonias (an der Schmelzgrenze) (2014), digital music
  - Dos Imbricaciones (2014), a group of two independent digital works
    - Imbricación I (Süredrath) (2012, 2014), digital music
    - Imbricación II (Silétsere) (2014), digital music
- La rueca de Mahatma (natura subascolta II) (2014), digital music
- W(e)aving (Ein Heldentod (sic)), Digitale Tondichtung (2013–14), digital music
- Kalte Töne (2013–14), digital music
- Todo y Molécula (2013–14), a cycle comprising 6 independent digital works
  - 1) Materia prima I, set 1c (Custos Horologii) (2014), digital music
  - 2) Materia prima II (Magma) (2014), digital music
  - 3) Materia prima III (Música Seca I) (2014–16), digital music
  - 4) Materia prima IV (Schwere Schwebstoffe) (2014–16), digital music
  - 5) Materia prima VI (Enigma XXI) (2014), digital music
  - 6) Materia prima VII (Traits and Trails) (2014), digital music
- Heridas (2016), digital music
- Exploración Diagonal Nº2 (2014–17), digital music
- Anima XM'ch'na I (Principal Pieces) (2017-2021), algorithmic compositions, digital music
  - Nº5 (XM'nc'ng) (2018)
  - Nº10 (XM'm'ri's) (2018)
  - Nº12 (XM'sh) (2018)
  - Nº13 (XM'rr'r) (2018)
  - Nº14 (XM'sur's) (2018)
  - Nº16 (XM'n'l'g) (2019)
  - Nº18 (XM'n'l'th) (2019)
  - Nº19 (XM'd'nt) (2019)
  - Nº21 (XM'sa'k) (2019)
  - Nº23 (XM'nt'cs) (2019)
  - Nº24 (XM'ns'ons) (2019)
  - Nº29 (XM'b) (2019)
  - Nº30 (XM'sts) (2019)
- Anima XM'ch'na I, Addendum (Secondary Pieces) (2017-2021), algorithmic compositions, digital music
  - Nº1 (XM'ng'lia) (2017) (**)
  - Nº2 (XM'r'ñao) (2017) (**)
  - Nº3 (XM'g'n'tio) (2018) (*)
  - Nº7 (XM'n'us) (2018) (***)
  - Nº11 (XM'nf'st) (2018) (*)
  - Nº15 (XM'dn'ght) (2019) (*)
  - Nº20 (X(M)p'nto) (2019) (*)
  - Nº22 (XM'ths) (2019) (*)
  - Nº25 (XM'ss1) (2019) (*)
  - Nº26 (XM'ss3) (2019) (*)
  - Nº27 (XM'ss4) (2019) (*)
  - Nº28 (XM'ss5) (2019) (*)

Note: the pieces, result of automatic generation and creation processes, were then (loosely) classified into the following categories: (*) Genéricos Instrumentales (Gramática de la (N.) Música (standard)), (**) Genéricos Globales (World Music), (***) Genéricos Americanos.

- Nº 11 (XM'nf'st II) (2018) (digital piano sound), algorithmic composition, digital music
- Aftermat(h) (2020) (digital piano sound), algorithmic composition, digital music
