= Saario =

Saario is a Finnish surname. Notable people:

- Antti Sakari Saario (born 1974), Finnish composer and academic
- Esa Saario (1931–2025), Finnish actor
- Martti Saario (1906–1988), Finnish organizational theorist and Professor of Accounting
- Tiina Saario (born 1982), Finnish football midfielder
