= Civilización o Barbarie =

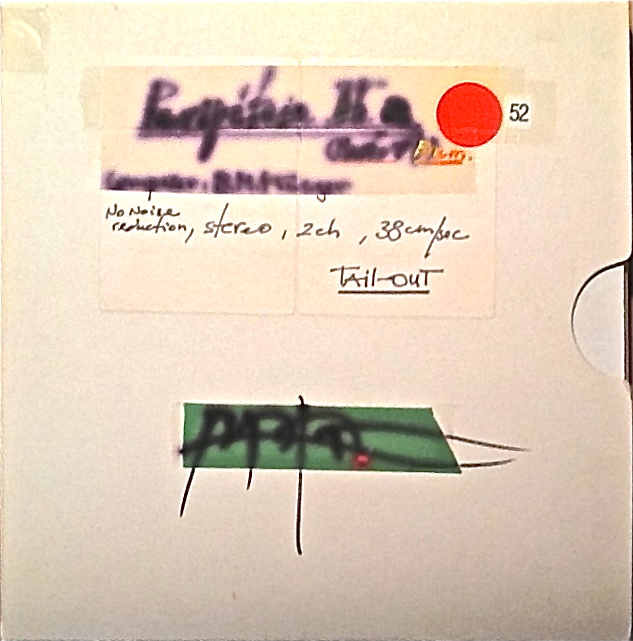
Peripéteia IIa (Master) example of cover art

Civilización o Barbarie (Civilization or Barbarism) is a tape-cycle from 1984 by the Argentinian composer Bernardo Mario Kuczer. (Note: The title is a paraphrase of the title of a book by the Argentine author and statesman Domingo Faustino Sarmiento, published in 1845: Facundo – Civilización y Barbarie – Vida de Juan Facundo Quiroga.)

== Structure ==
=== The basic cycle ===
The basic cycle comprises 18 independent tape pieces, some of them with different versions. Each piece can be performed separately and individually, as well as in open and variable groupings with other pieces of the cycle. The total duration of the basic cycle, (basic 18 pieces), amounts to some two and a half hours, extending to over three hours when all the different versions are included.

=== The cycle as a whole ===
Although each of the 18 pieces and the different versions of them, are in themselves completely independent, self-contained entities, the cycle as a whole embodies different groups of works and work-groups, which can also be understood as "cycles within the cycle", as follows:

The "Peripéteia" cycle:

                                                     Duration
 Peripéteia IIa, IIb’, (IIb’’), IIc, IIe’’, IIf (IIa = 2'20")
 Peripéteia III                                        3'33"
 Peripéteia IV                                        12'41"
 Peripéteia V                                          8'00"
 Peripéteia VI                                         6'25"
 Peripéteia VII: Iña’K                                 3'14"
 Peripéteia VIII: Periplo                             11'40"

The group: "… de la mémoire":

 Une mémoire la vie                                   10'08"
 Finale, ou la mémoire pulsante                        9'39"
 Cri de la mémoire fermée                             15'00"

The pieces: "Ejercicio de aire":

 Version: (2 + c x 2)                                  8'36"
           C   2
 Version: (1C + st)                                    8'36"
 Version: (1b)                                         8'47"
 Version: (C + 1x 10)                          16'00"
           2

A cycle of single pieces which belong only to the whole cycle:

 Contre-rime                                          10'36"
 one other desert                                      9'32"
 Him’l                                                 7'19"
 Dream line                                            7'57"
 Escenas-Miró                                          7'57"
 hole the black                                        5'45"
 … und Stille daneben                                  6'16"

== Program note from 1984 ==
CIVILIZACION O BARBARIE (1984)

The process of writing music (written music) involves only some "particular" channels of decision making. These "normal" channels have been moulded by our own personal history to react and give answer to a certain "system of logics" designed to solve the conflict arising between our own inner fantasies, expectations, limitations and desires and the ones which the outer world, society, press on us. This tape-cycle is an experience in trying to break through some of these defences, attempting to voyage some of the forbidden parts of myself, leaving behind "sounding traces" proof of the existence of other "civilizations or barbarisms" in me.
The title challenges the listener to make a judgment and decide which of these two territories I have visited. (Note: "As I point out in the program notes, "Civilización o Barbarie" is the title under which eighteen absolutely Independent tape pieces (with individual names) are gathered ... Although the goal is showing the self efficient "worlds" each of the units has attempted to create, I am not providing individual program notes for each of the pieces. That corresponds to my believe in a "creative listener", who should at this stage, contact the music free, and do the work himself. Should fight with the "sounding realities", make his own individual listening through, trying to take personal position to each of the pieces (like the composer), everybody through its own "logic" and experience, creating, building own priorities and securities, "surviving" by himself, without the guiding perspective of the composers view, what his expectations were, his priorities, his believes and dreams, what he had in mind, or what he says he had...". This complementary text was extracted from a personal letter from the composer to Harry Halbreich, organizer of the Festival and the Paris concert from 1985 (see 3.1.3) and appeared (in a French translation and under the title "Au sujet du concert de ce soir"), with the composer's permission, accompanying the program notes of the pieces, in the general program book of the festival. Concerts, Radio France, "Perspectives du XXe Sciecle", Alain Bancquart, Germaine Canard, Producteurs Délégués, Cinquieme Concert, page 42-43.)
Bernardo Mario Kuczer

== Performance practice ==
Civilización o Barbarie is the general title under which eighteen independent tape pieces, with individual names, are gathered. "Each piece in this cycle can be played individually, as well as in (open) groups with other pieces of the cycle". Kuczer has written extensive instructions regarding possible performances of grouped pieces of the cycle, in particular, marking the importance of a very careful selection and sequencing of the pieces into what he later called a particular "concert-form" (Note: "When planning a concert, a particular 'concert shape', that means, a concert with a definite 'listening strategy' underlying it, determines the program, its length and the order in which the pieces appear. This program selection was done in order to try to signal out the mentioned individualities, while at the same time, treating the whole, in the form of a single piece of music, 'silent bridges' between them reflecting its oppositions and coincidences, confronting different processes of listening and listening approaches. For this reason the pieces were selected not only by their own individual qualities, but also by their capacity to behave within a 'chain', i.e. in relation to each other." Same quotation reference as Note Nbr.1.) He also gave indications about the maximum number of pieces conforming such a form, of its maximum total duration and about the approximate duration of the pauses in between the individual pieces. He suggested also, how the auditorium should be prepared with regards to lighting and ambiance.

=== Performance examples ===
==== Darmstadt ====
Presented at the Darmstädter Ferienkurse, 28 July 1984, 1:00 AM:

1. "Him’l" (7'19")
2. "Peripéteia V" (8'00")
3. "Ejercicio de aire (2/C + c/2 x 2)" (8'36")
4. "Peripéteia VII: Iña’K" (3'14")

The pieces were threaded by relatively short pauses. The duration of the music itself amounted to c. 25 minutes.

==== Como, Italy ====
Presented at the 18th Annual "Autunno Muscale" festival, Como, Italy, 5 October 1984, 6:00 PM

1. "Peripéteia VII: Iña’K" (3'14")
2. "Cri de la mémoire fermée" (15'00")
3. "Peripéteia VIII: Periplo" (11'40")
4. "Une mémoire la vie" (10'08")

The total duration amounted to c. 40 minutes, with long pauses in between pieces.

==== Paris ====
Presented at "Perspectives du XXe siècle", at the Grand Auditorium of the Maison de Radio France, Paris, France, 19 January 1985, 10:30 PM

1. "Contre-rime" (10'36")
2. "Ejercicio de aire: (2/C + c/2 x 2)" (8'36")
3. "Peripéteia VII: Iña’K" (3'14")
4. "Peripéteia VIII: Periplo" (11'40")
5. "Une mémoire la vie (Version A)" (10'08")

This concert featured bridging pauses between the pieces lasting exactly one minute each, bringing the total duration of the performance to some 45 minutes. The complete concert was recorded and broadcast during 1985 on Radio France.

==== Basel ====
Presented at "Volkshaus" by the International Society for Contemporary Music, Basel, 14 September 1985.

This concert represents an example of a completely different type of concert situation and concert-form. In the first part of the program, the "Peripéteia II e’’" (2'28") was played between orchestral and instrumental works (performed by the Symphony Orchestra Basel conducted by Bernhard Wulff), separated by large pauses. The second half of the concert consisted entirely of tape pieces of the cycle. The general concert-form was organized as follows:

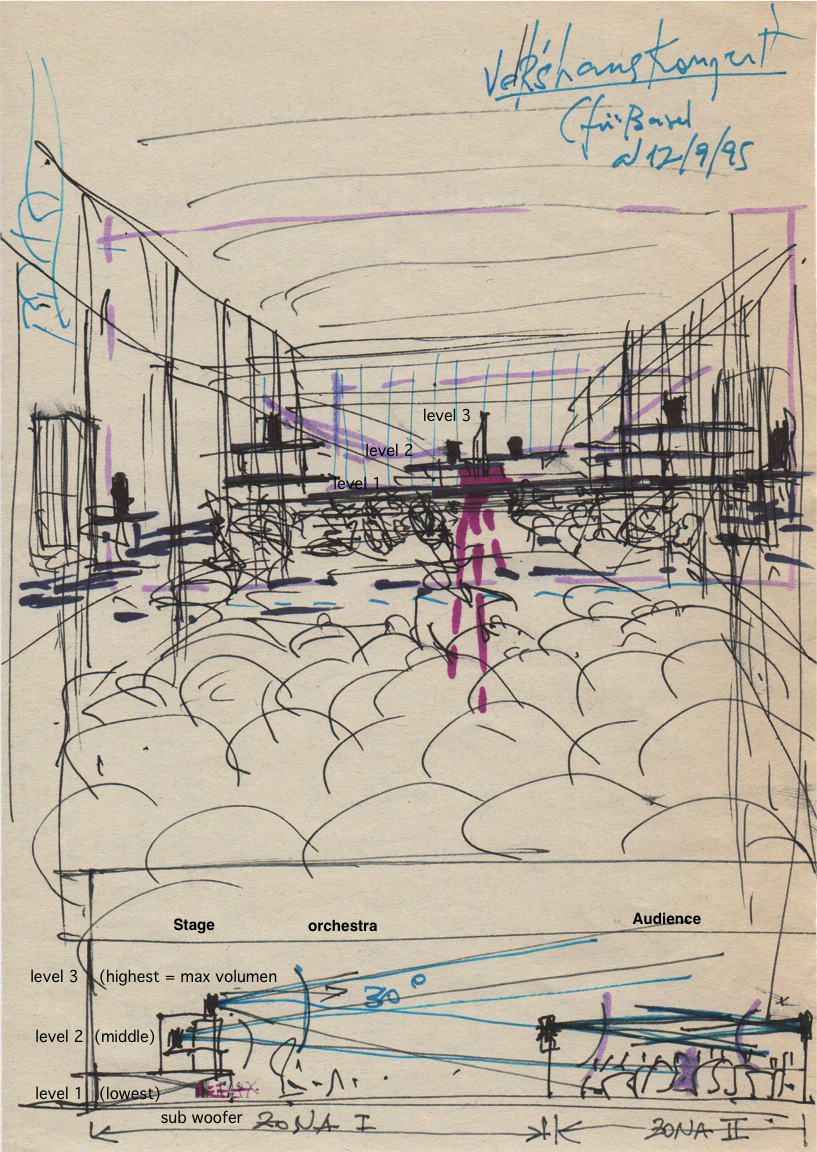
Basel, Concert Space Concept

1. "Peripéteia II e’’" (2'28") within first half
2. "Peripéteia II b’" (2'24") second half
3. "Peripéteia V" (8'00")
4. "Peripéteia VI" (6'25")

The pieces alternated with (relatively) long pauses. The complete duration of the second half comprised c. 22 minutes.

The images below show the Sound-Space-Form designed for this concert.

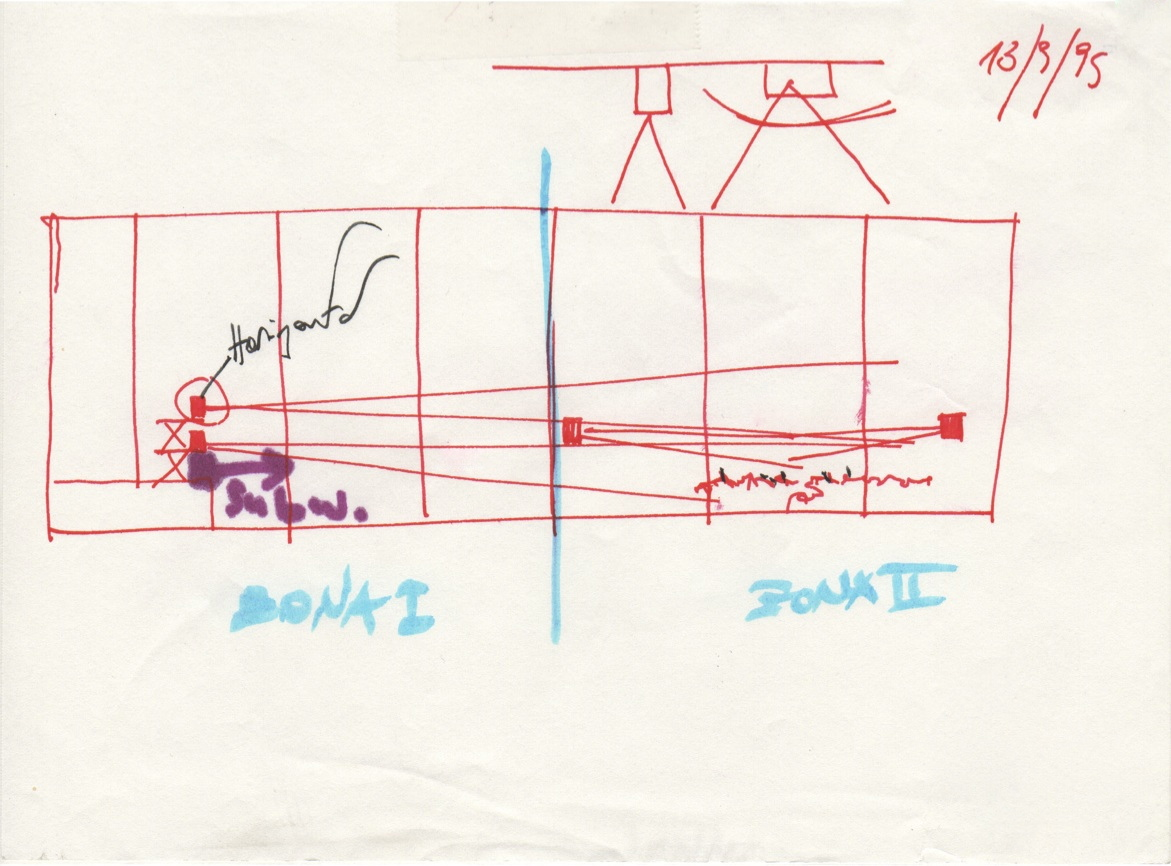
Sound-Space concept

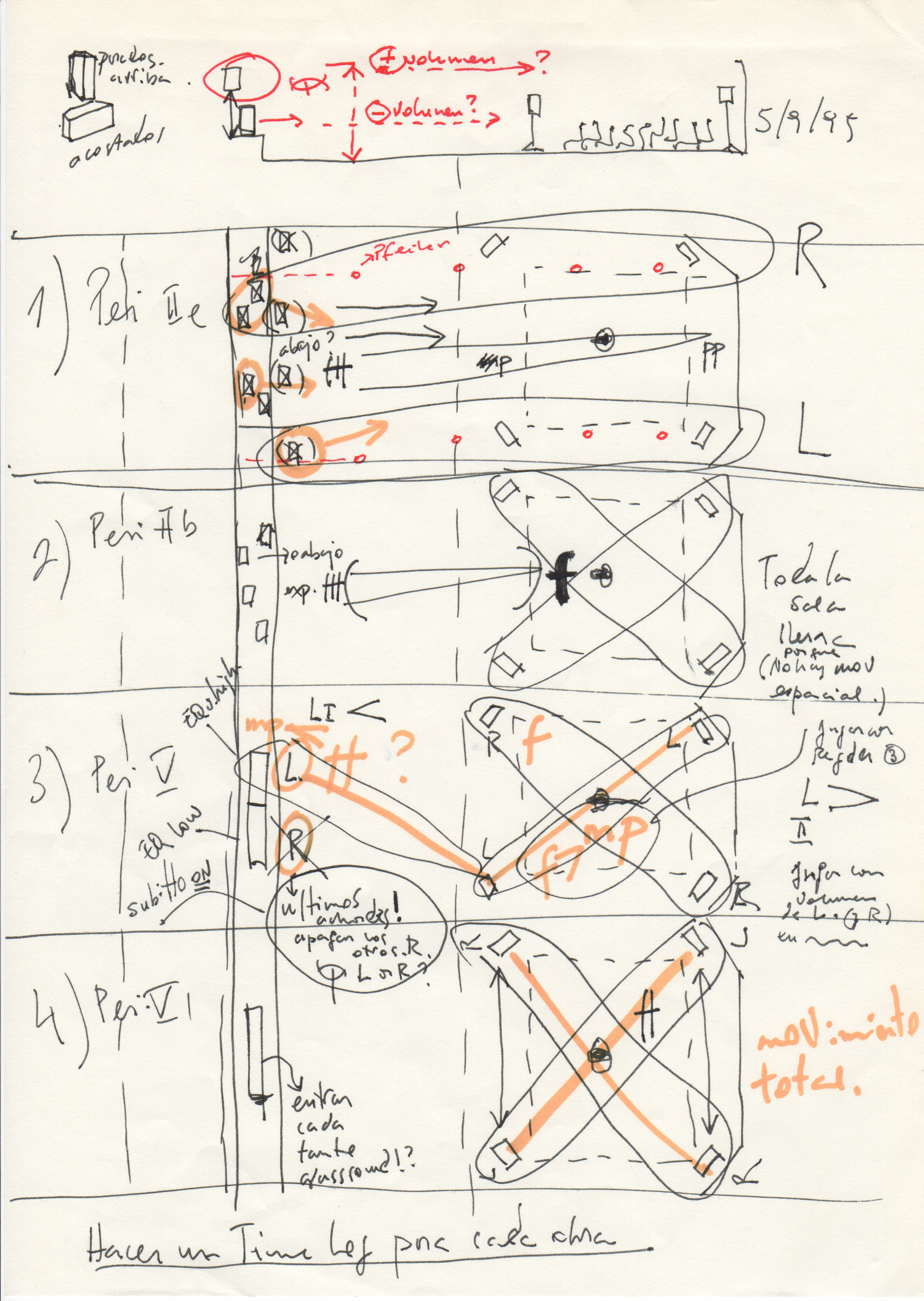
Sound-Space-Form development

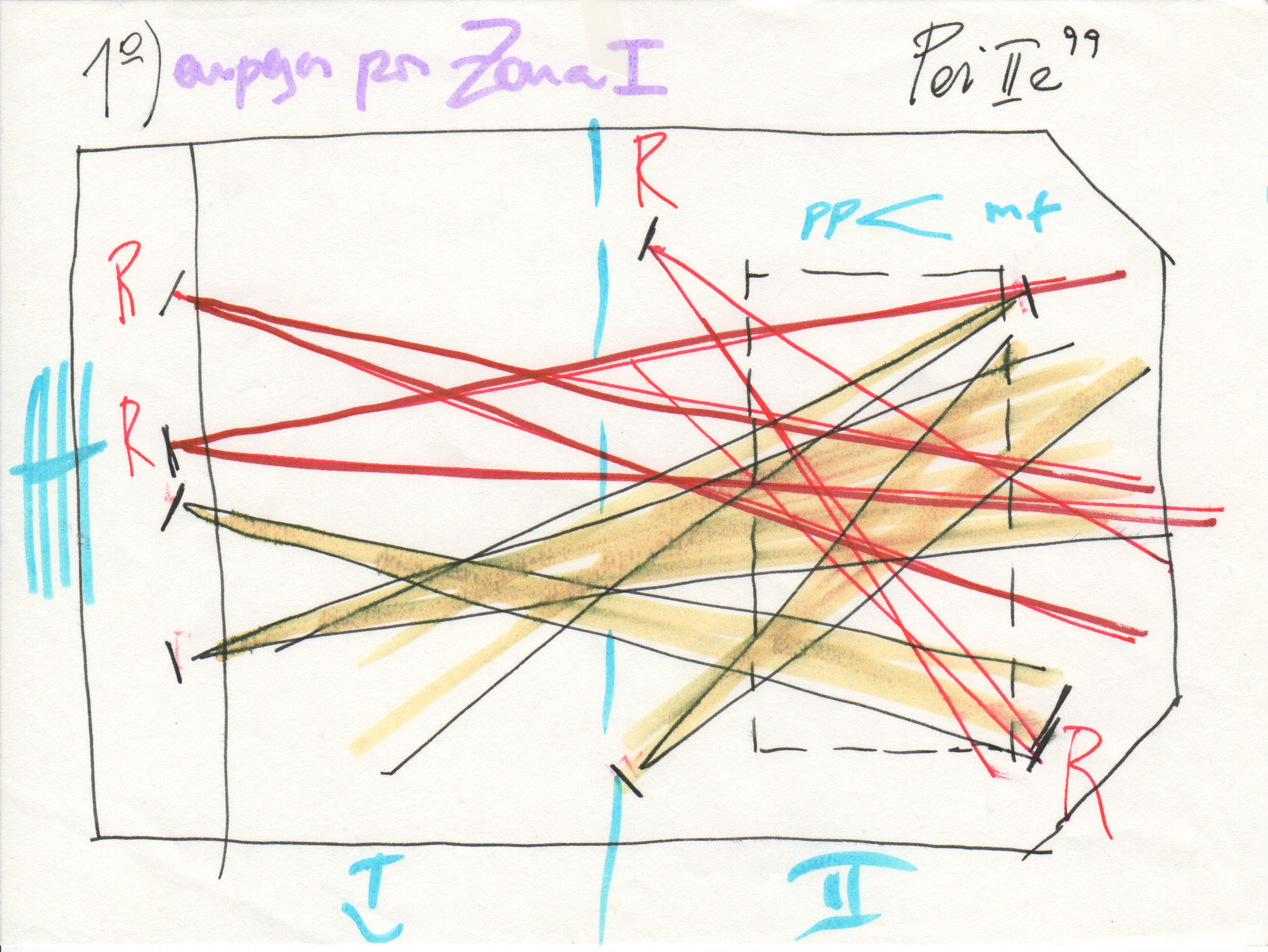
1º) Peripéteia IIe"

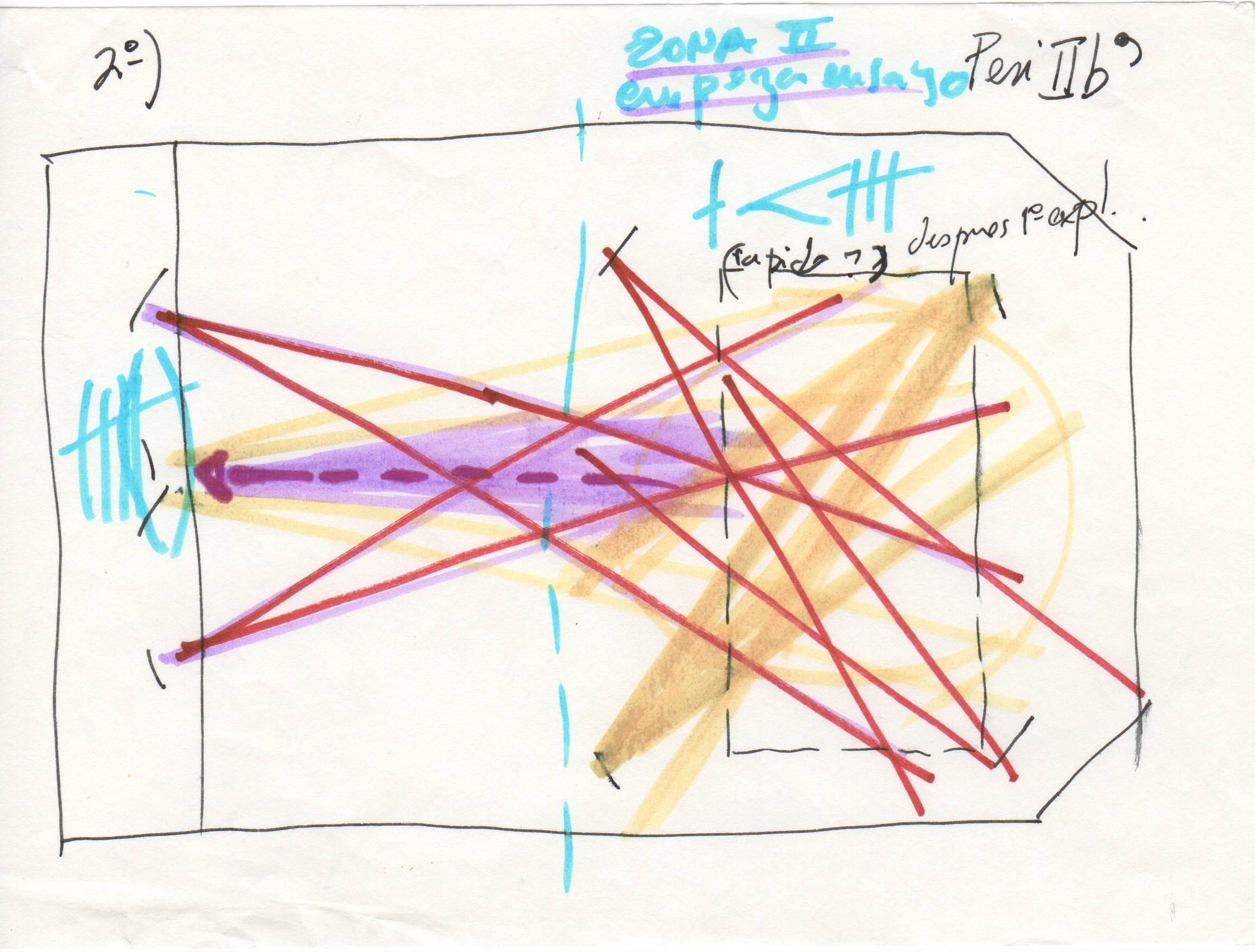
2º) Peripéteia IIb'

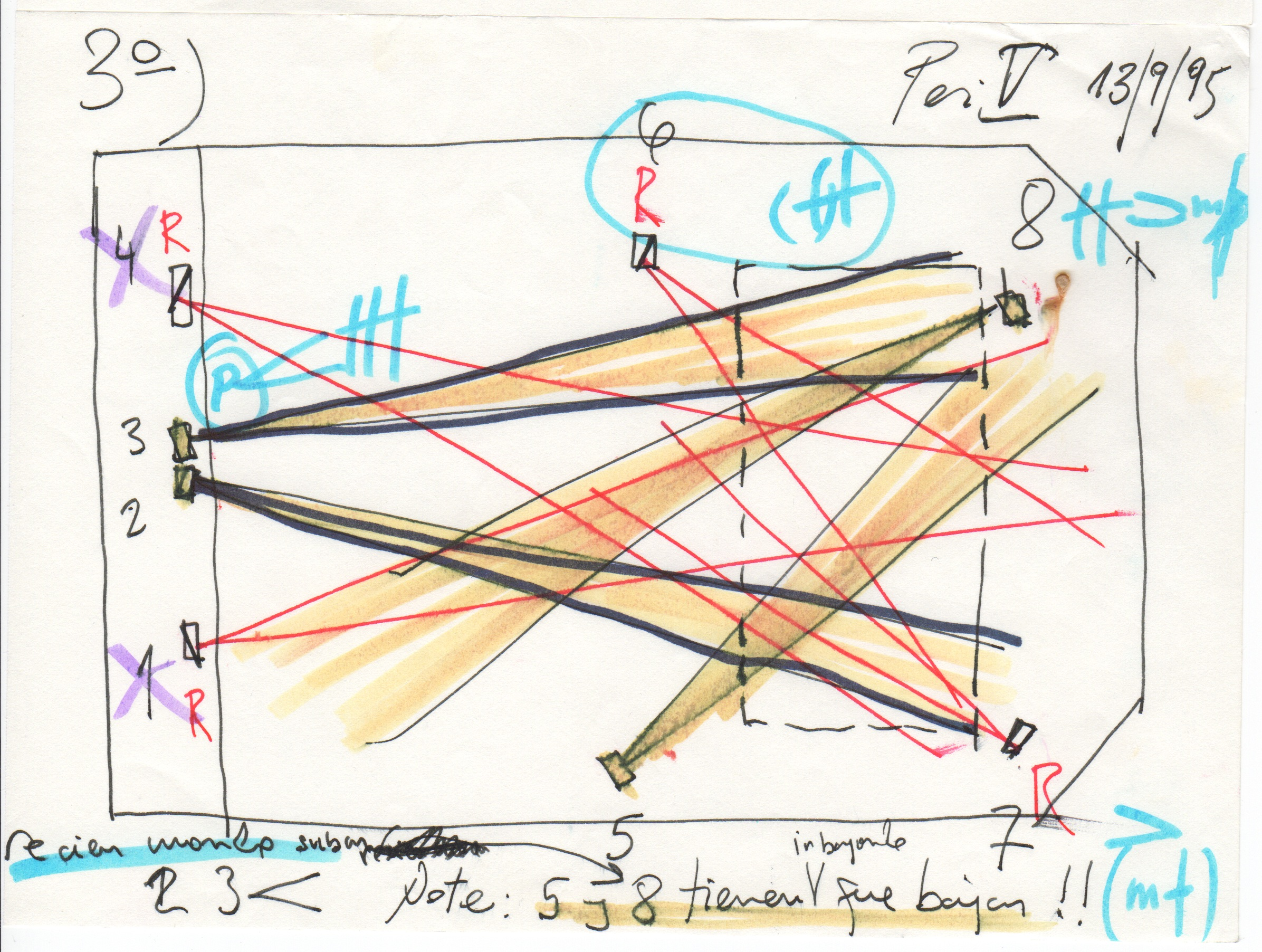
3º) Peripéteia V

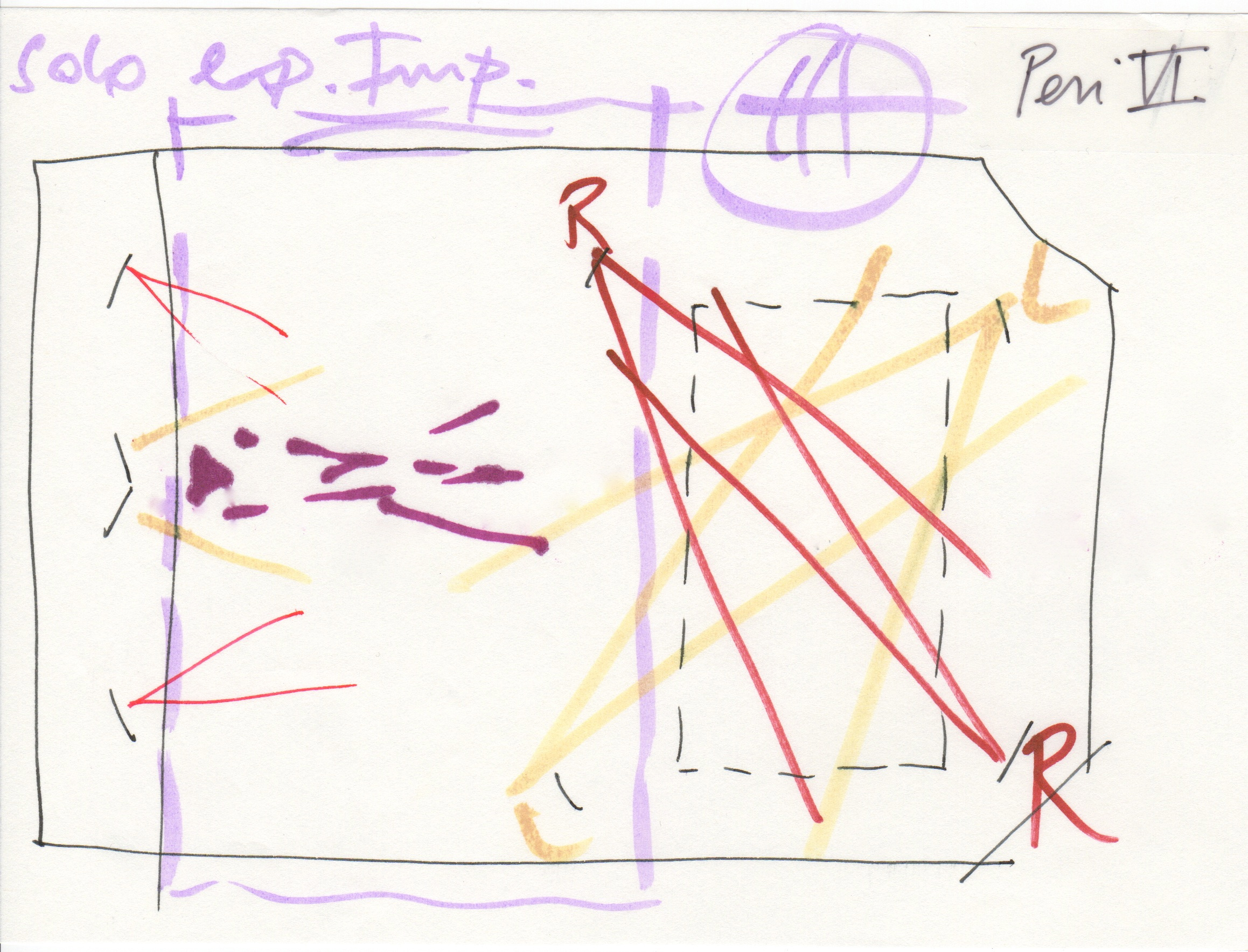
4º) Peripéteia VI"

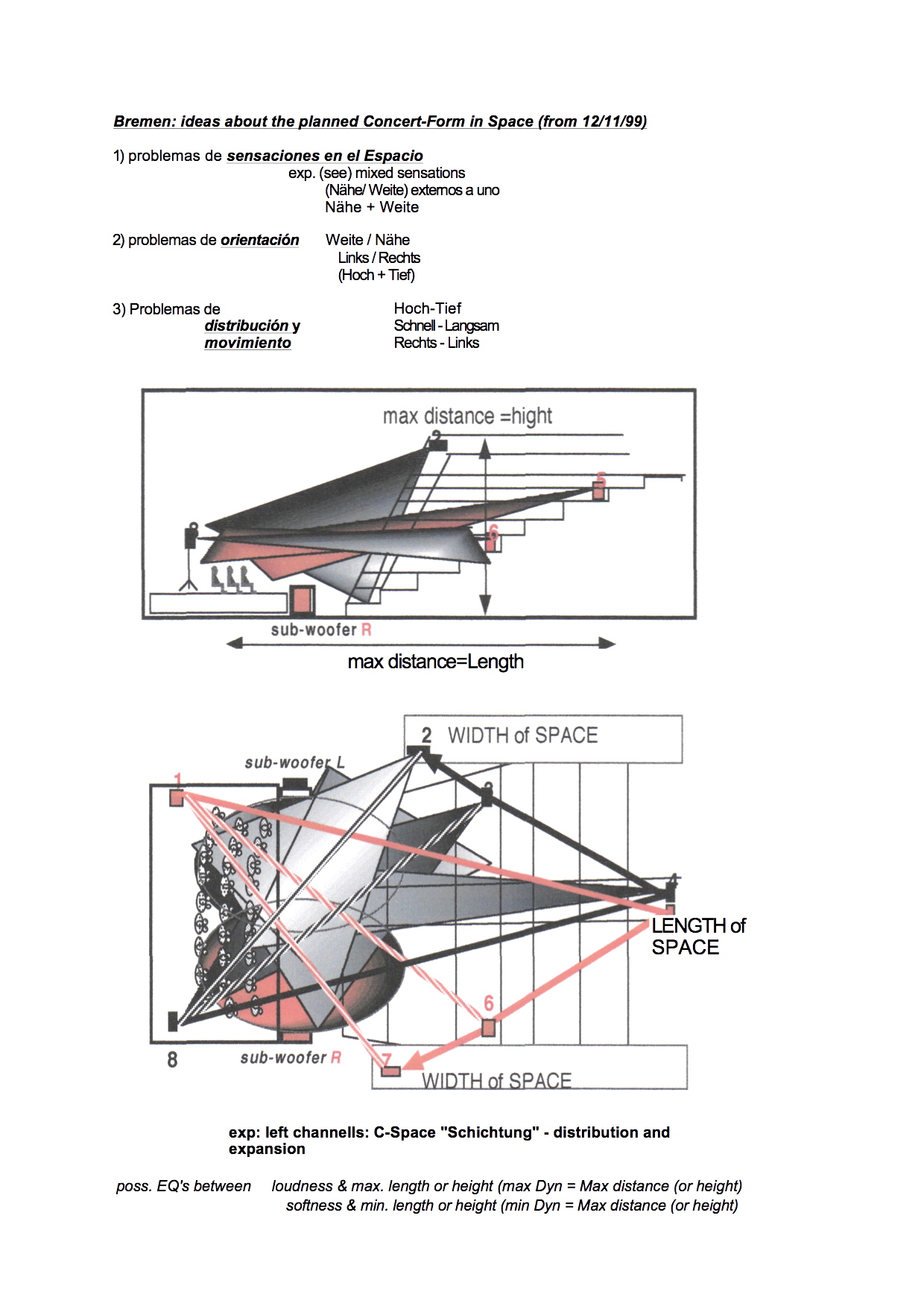
Bremen, Concert Space Concept. Inverted situation: the audience sitting on the stage, the loudspeakers on the ranks

==== Bremen ====
Presented at the Festival "Transit" Orte/NichtOrte [somewhere/nowhere], at the Kulturzentrum Schlachthof, Bremen, Germany, 12 November 1999, 11:00 PM

A relatively long concert, one with a challenging Concert-Form was planned and publicly announced:

1. "Peripéteia II a’’" (2'20")
2. "Peripéteia II b’’" (2'24")
3. "Peripéteia II e’’" (2'28")
4. "Peripéteia VI" (6'25")
5. "Dream line" (7'57")

The pieces would alternate with long (irregular) pauses. The planned total duration of the concert was to reach c. 25 minutes.

In the end, the concert could not be realized the way it was planned. Instead, only "Peripéteia II e’’" was performed.

== Work history ==
In 1984 Kuczer was invited to perform a first concert with pieces from Civilización o Barbarie at the "Darmstädter Ferienkurse" in Darmstadt. The invitation was made on behalf of Brian Ferneyhough, who had the chance to hear some of the pieces beforehand. In a letter to the organizers he wrote: "In my opinion these pieces... are partly of very great interest". And later: "... I consider him to be a major composer in this area".

The first public performance of some of the pieces from Civilización o Barbarie took then place at a Studio-Concert in the “Darmstädter Ferienkurse” on the 28 July 1984. (see 3.1.1) For this cycle, Kuczer was awarded the Kranichsteiner Musikpreis ("Kranichstein Music Prize"), the first time the award was granted to a Latin American.

In 1986, for the next edition of the Darmstadt Courses, Kuczer was invited to perform a second concert with works of the cycle.

Civilización o Barbarie was later selected as "personal choice of the jury" by Klaus Huber, (Note: Klaus Huber suggested to the composer the piece Ejercicio de aire 2/C + c/2 x2 for performance at the ISCM concert.) one of the three jurors, for the ISCM (International Society for Contemporary Music) World Music Days, which took place in Cologne in 1987.

Although between 1984 and 1999 several of the works belonging to the Civilización o Barbarie cycle have been performed a number of times, either in "Group-form" and/or also individually as part of mixed concerts in different cities of Europe, a substantial part of the pieces have remained unplayed.

== Reception ==
The performances of the pieces of Civilización o Barbarie, although generally considered as a "secret tip", have often been surrounded by great controversy and even true scandals: listeners (even full orchestras) running out of the concert hall, parts of the public being horrified, the pieces being smeared by the most conservative part of the audiences and their music critics. Some reports contain mixed feelings showing that the musicians and critics were somehow under shock, moved, puzzled, perhaps confused, revolted, captivated and outraged at the same time, having to admit, though, that something in a way "unforgettable" had taken place.

The premiere of Civilización o Barbarie in Darmstadt in 1984 was described by Hans-Joachim Hespos as follows:

... whoever once in his life has stood, with fluttering pant legs, in the middle of loud blasting sound-waves before loudspeekers, knows what loudness can bring about. I heard this once in my life, in a performance of a piece by the Argentinian composer Bernardo Kuczer. An interesting sound-work... all that has been captured, edited and projected with excessive decibels through big speakers: such a gross terribleness has remained unforgettable to me.

Other well known musicians and serious music critics have given their opinion.

Reinhard Oehlschlägel, editor of MusikTexte, called it "a highly complex, experimental and political music," and later described it as "The sonically most extreme example [of a series of tape compositions by Latin American composers introduced at the Cologne Musikhochschule], as was already the case at the Darmstädter Ferienkursen 1986."

Monika Lichtenfeld called it "a music of bursting wildness and signal setting expressiveness" composed of "archaic, crude, complexly towered sounds."

The author Antonio Trudu wrote in his comprehensive book about Darmstadt referring to the concert of 1984:

...the Argentine Bernardo Kuczer, whose immense cycle of electroacoustic pieces, under the title Civilización o Barbarie, was presented at such a volume, that induced many of the present to listen from outside the hall, being this one of the most extraordinary pieces of music that were heard in Darmstadt this year...

And referring to the 1986 concert:

from Bernardo Kuczer we heard another two parts (Peripéteia III and Cri de la mémoire fermée) from his monumental cycle Civilización o Barbarie.

The following statement by the Belgian musicologist Harry Halbreich stands as a notable representative of the controversy:

However, the end of the evening had to be spent... in the company of the Argentinian Bernardo Kuczer living in Germany and some of his apocalyptic electroacoustic pieces grouped into an immense cycle under the title Civilización o Barbarie. I admit that I fled. But two days later I was able to hear again, at a somewhat more bearable volume level, these extraordinary pieces of music of a visionary madman, skinned alive, bleeding shreds of flesh of a prodigious expressive power, produced, paradoxically, with a simple cassette tape recorder! (Note: Original French: Il fallut néanmoins terminer la soirée... en compagnie de l'argentin fixé en Allemagne Bernardo Kuczer et de ses apocalyptiques pièces électro-acoustiques groupées dans un immense cycle intitulé "Civilización o Barbarie". J'avoue avoir fui. Mais deux jours plus tard, j'ai pu réentendre à un niveau sonore un peu plus supportable ces musiques extraordinaires de fou visionnaire, d'écorché vif, lambeaux de chair saignante d'une prodigieuse puissance expressive réalisés, paradoxalement, avec un simple magnétophone à cassettes !)
