= Butterworth Prize for Composition =

The Butterworth Prize for Composition, named in honour of English composer George Butterworth (1885–1916), was awarded by the Society for the Promotion of New Music annually between 1993 and 2008. It is now awarded annually by Sound and Music, and there are also Butterworth Prizes for Law and for Literature.

== Winners ==
- Richard Causton (1993)
- Hywel Davies
- Peter McGarr
- Michael Gorodecki (1993), with Music for Andrei (organ solo)
- David Prior (1998)
- Cameron Sinclair
- Sohrab Uduman
- Gavin Thomas (1995)
- Jeremy Thurlow (2007)
- Raymond Yiu (2003)
- Brahim Kerkour (2013)
- Nathaniel Mann (2014) for pigeon whistles
- Paul McGuire (2015), for Panels
- Pia Palme (2016)
- Sarah Lianne Lewis (2018)
- Blasio Kavuma (2019)
