= Antti Sakari Saario =

Antti Saario
- Born: 1 January 1974 (age 51)
- Origin: Lahti, Finland
- Occupation(s): musician, artist, record producer, academic
- Website: Antti Sakari Saario

Antti Saario is a contemporary electroacoustic composer and academic.

== Biography ==
Born in 1974 in Lahti, Finland, Antti Sakari Saario graduated in mathematics and electronic music at Keele University in 1997.

He continued his studies in composition under Jonty Harrison at the University of Birmingham - working with Birmingham ElectroAcoustic Sound Theatre ( BEAST ) - receiving his PhD from Birmingham University in 2002 (PhD, University of Birmingham, School of Humanities, Department of Music, 2002). His numerous postgraduate compositions have been performed in a variety of venues and through a wide range of mediums - Most notably B-Side (1998) — A Fixed media composition. This was Released on Spike Works from BEAST — vol. 1. London: Sargasso Records. It was further featured in the Canadian Electroacoustic Community’s release Presence II . B-Side (1998) was positively reviewed by Rajmil Fischman in Sonic Arts Network's publication Diffusion, reprinted in eContact!.

After a period of experimental work in Norway, Antti Sakari Saario undertook his current teaching post at Falmouth University. His second wave of non-commercial compositional output began to emerge in the 2006 and has continued to date. Notable compositions have included :

Making Space: When The Curtain Falls (2007) - an acousmatic play for multichannel playback system and blacked-out space, performed as part of Nuffield Theatre's Making Space 2007 bursary/mini-residency scheme. This work was featured at ACMC 2008, Sydney Conservatorium of Music - The University of Sydney, Australia in July 2008.

Flocking: an improvatorio (2007-) for voices, string quartet and live-electronics. A free improvisation led by Steve Lewis in collaboration with David Prior. This was a site specific performance at Ashton Memorial as part of Lancaster Jazz Festival.. It subsequently featured at View Two Gallery, Liverpool, UK on Sept 6th, 2007. . A DVD of the Jazz Festival performance was produced with a 5.1 surround audio recording by David Prior, Saario and video artist Jenny McCabe.

=== Influences ===
Saario's work reflect his evolution as a composer - he readily acknowledges the influence of his tutors and collaborators on his work. Jonty Harrison, David Prior, Iain Armstrong and Robert Penman have left a telling influence on his sonic production. One characteristic feature of Dr Saarios work is his willingness to counterbalance within his work a wide range of aesthetic and academic approaches. The literary output of William S. Burroughs has been evident since his earliest compositions. The philosophy of Deleuze and Guattari and the filmwork of David Lynch and the Dogma 95 collaboration in particular underpin his composition as well as his academic approach. Since 2001 majority of his output has been collaborative, and in many instances interdisciplinary (e.g. 'The Hollywoods' and 'Aboriginal Terraformations' with visual artist Amanda Newall, and the [zygote] concept with composer and musicologist Martin Iddon). His personal interests in martial arts can be clearly evidenced in his recent work - Making Space: When The Curtain Falls (2007) . Saario is a senior student of Nick Hudis - acclaimed bodyworker and Qigong teacher.
