= BHW =

- Company type: private
- Industry: Financial services
- Founded: 1928
- Headquarters: Berlin, Germany
- Area served: predominantly Germany
- Services: terminating deposits, mortgage loans
- Parent: Deutsche Postbank
- Website: www.bhw.de

BHW, incorporated as BHW Holding AG, is German bank providing terminating deposits and mortgage loans. It is a wholly owned subsidiary of Deutsche Postbank Group.

== History ==
The company was founded in Berlin in 1928 as Beamten-Heimstättenwerk, which roughly translates as civil servants' home (building) society. After World War II, it moved its registered office to Hameln.

In 1990, it was re-organised as BHW Holding GmbH to become BHW Holding AG later, followed by an initial public offering in 1997. In March 2005, Deutsche Postbank announced that it has acquired a 9.2% stake in the company. Later that year, Deutsche Postbank made public its intent to purchase more than 90% of BHW's shares and made an offer to remaining shareholders. The acquisition was completed in 2005.

Until 2019, BHW Kreditservice GmbH took over the management of customers of other mortgage banks and building societies, such as Axa Bausparkasse and DSL Bank (so-called loan processing as an outsourcing service), in addition to servicing its own customers.

DB Bauspar, which is part of the Deutsche Bank Group, sold home savings contracts under the BHW brand name from January 6, 2014 to December 31, 2015; in 2019, the two providers were merged under the BHW name.
