= Branch office =

Outlet of an organization or a company

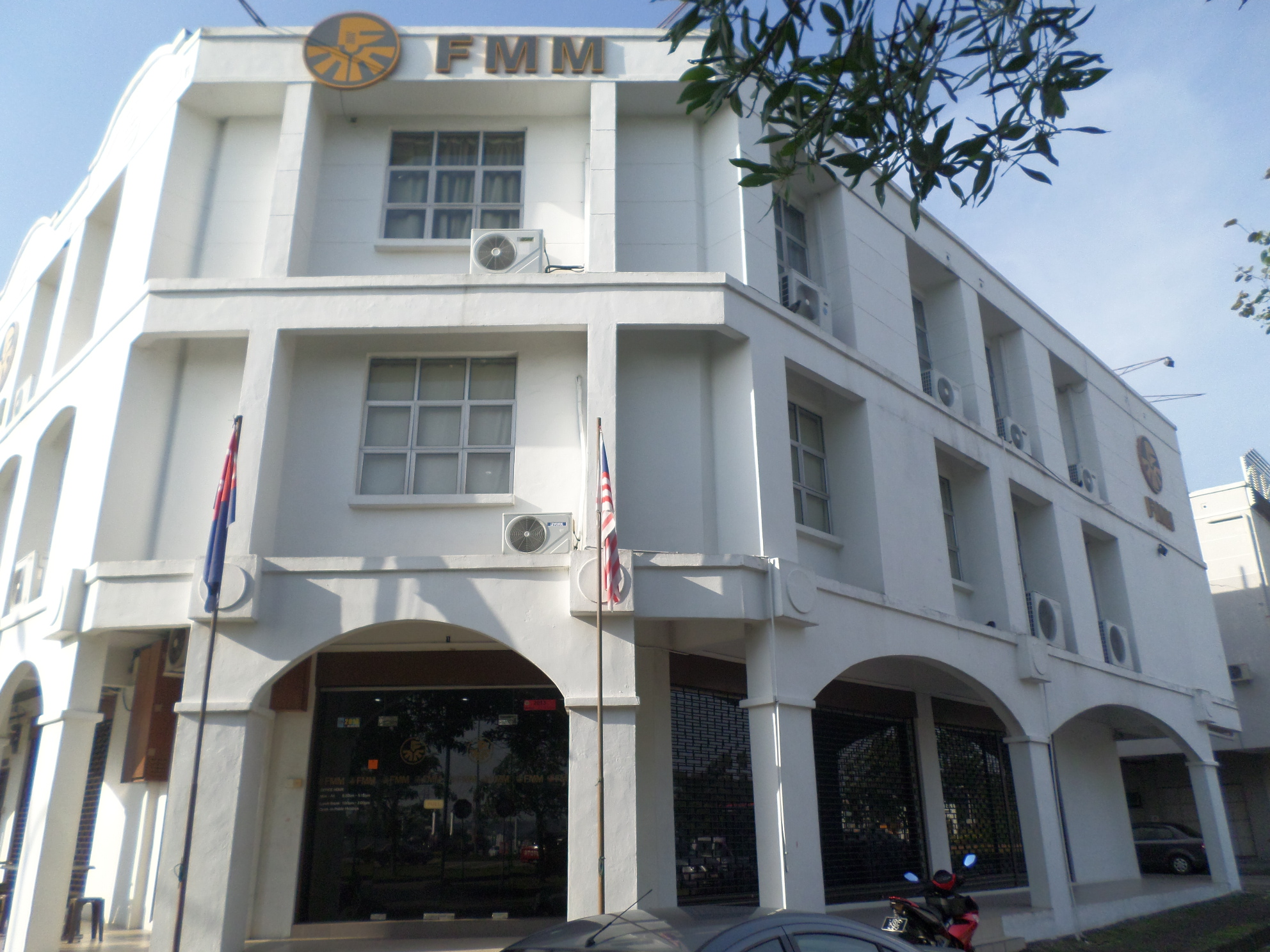
The Johor branch office of Federation of Malaysian Manufacturers.

A branch office is an outlet of a company or, more generally, an organization that – unlike a subsidiary – does not constitute a separate legal entity, while being physically separated from the organization's main office. Branching is particularly widespread in banking and other financial institutions, where the products' complexity requires local offices to act more like an agency than as a separate company. A branch structure exposes the owning company to full taxability and legal liability in regard to the branch office's operations.
