= British Homing World =

- Categories: Sporting Magazine
- Frequency: Weekly
- Circulation: 24,000 (within the U.K.)
- Publisher: Royal Pigeon Racing Association
- Founded: 1933
- Country: United Kingdom
- Language: English

The British Homing World (BHW) is a pigeon racing weekly magazine.

== History and profile ==
BHW was founded in 1933. The magazine is a publication of the Royal Pigeon Racing Association, and has a circulation of around 20,000 copies per week. In 2010 its circulation was 24,000 copies.
