= Society for the Promotion of New Music =

The Society for the Promotion of New Music (SPNM), originally named The Committee for the Promotion of New Music, was founded in January 1943 in London by the émigré composer Francis Chagrin, to promote the creation and performance of new music in the UK by young and unestablished composers. Since 1993 it has awarded the annual Francis Chagrin Award and the Butterworth Prize for Composition. In 2008, it merged with three other networks to form Sound and Music.

== History ==
The Committee for the Promotion of New Music was a membership organization which sought to find the best new composers and to help support their careers, especially in the UK. Francis Chagrin has been described as the Committee's "organizer and chief moving spirit". Fellow émigré composer Benjamin Frankel said that by establishing it he "gave many composers (not only the young ones) their first opportunity of a hearing: he had travelled abroad as our representative, had battled with publishers and spoken passionately on the question of performing rights. He had, in fact, become the first person to whom we turned when composer's problems arose".

Mátyás Seiber and Roy Douglas were also among the founding members of the Committee. Ralph Vaughan Williams agreed to become president with the proviso that it "avoid all cliques [and] give a welcome to all good work in whatever style or school". Arthur Bliss was appointed as vice-president, and Benjamin Britten and Michael Tippett served on the Committee. Its initial activities were subsidized by the wartime Council for the Encouragement of Music and the Arts and by private donations from Vaughan Williams and Bliss among others, and remained the basis for much of its subsequent work: "recommended lists" of works were drawn up, which resulted in increased broadcasting by the BBC and in several recordings, issued in the 1940s on 78 rpm discs by Decca. By October 1951, a draft amended Constitution had been prepared, and on 27 May 1952 the Society for the Promotion of New Music met for its inaugural meeting.

On 5 February 1973 the Society celebrated its 30th anniversary with a concert at the Queen Elizabeth Hall. It had commissioned a new piece from Francis Chagrin to mark the event but he was ill and unable to complete the work. Chagrin died on 10 November 1972. At his request, his Lamento appassionato for string orchestra was played instead. This was one of the few times his own work was ever performed at an SPNM event. The Francis Chagrin Fund for Young Composers was established in his memory in 1973 and continues today. From 1993 onward SPNM awarded the annual Butterworth Prize for Composition.

In its first 50 years, some 9,000 scores were submitted to the SPNM, resulting in 850 composers being represented in its concerts. On 1 October 2008, the SPNM merged with the British Music Information Centre (BMIC), the Contemporary Music Network and the Sonic Arts Network, forming a new organisation to promote contemporary music in the UK called Sound and Music.
